= 2020 Meath Intermediate Football Championship =

94th Meath Intermediate Football Championship
Tournament details
- County: Meath
- Province: Leinster
- Year: 2020
- Trophy: Mattie McDonnell Cup
- Sponsor: Meade Potato
- Date: 1 August - 3 October
- Teams: 20
- Defending champions: Nobber

Winners
- Champions: Ballinabrackey (1st win)
- Manager: Gordon McDonnell
- Captain: Nicky Judge

Runners-up
- Runners-up: Trim
- Manager: Brendan Murphy

Other
- Website: Meath GAA

The 2020 Meath Intermediate Football Championship is the 94th edition of the Meath GAA's premier club Gaelic football tournament for Intermediate graded teams in County Meath, Ireland. The tournament consists of 20 teams and starts with a group stage before progressing to a knock out stage. The winner will not represent Meath in the Leinster Intermediate Club Football Championship as the GAA made the decision to cancel the 2020 Provincial and All-Ireland Club Championships due to the impact of the COVID-19 pandemic on Gaelic games.

Nobber were the 2019 Meath Intermediate Football Champions after they defeated Trim in the final. As a result, they will compete in the 2020 Meath Senior Football Championship.

Three teams were relegated from the Senior Football Championship in 2019. Longwood returned to the I.F.C. after spending just one season in the Senior Football Championship. Rathkenny returned to the I.F.C. for the first time since 2006 while St. Patrick's returned to the I.F.C. for the first time since 2000. Clann na nGael and Moylagh were promoted to the I.F.C. from the Meath Junior Football Championship. Due to the change in championship structures, any second teams competing at the Intermediate grade were to be regraded to a new Premier Championship consisting only of reserve teams. To this effect, Donaghmore/Ashbourne 'B' and St. Peter's Dunboyne 'B' were regraded to Division 1 of the Premier Championship. No team was relegated from the I.F.C. in 2019.

The 2020 Meath Intermediate Football Championship was due to commence in April 2020. However, due to health measures implemented in Ireland to combat the COVID-19 pandemic, all GAA activity was initially suspended until 29 March 2020 with the suspension being extended until 19 April 2020 and then 5 May 2020. The GAA published a return to action protocol update on May 6 which stated that the suspension of GAA activity was "expected to remain in place until July 20". Meath GAA county board published their return to play document on June 11 outlining the 2020 adult championship formats and announcing the calendar for the completion of the 2020 football and hurling championships. The draw for the group stages of the championship took place on 21 June 2020 with the games commencing on 31 July 2020. The 2020 Meath Intermediate Football Championship Final took place on 3 October 2020 prior to the commencement of the 2020 GAA Intercounty season on 17 October 2020. Ballinabrackey won their first ever Meath Intermediate Football Championship by beating Trim 0–16 to 1–12. Ballinabrackey will compete in the Meath Senior Football Championship in 2021 for the first time in their history.

== Championship structure ==
Due to the short window (11 weeks) to complete the 2020 Meath Intermediate Football Championship, some changes were made to the initial championship format. The championship will consist of five groups with each containing four teams. However, only the group winners will progress to the knockout stages while the bottom team in each group will contest the relegation playoffs.

== Team changes ==
The following teams changed division since the 2019 championship season:

=== From I.F.C. ===
Promoted to 2020 S.F.C.

- Nobber - (Intermediate Champions)

Regraded to 2020 Premier Championship

- Donaghmore/Ashbourne 'B'
- St. Peter's Dunboyne 'B'

=== To I.F.C. ===
Relegated from 2019 S.F.C.

- Longwood
- St. Patrick's
- Rathkenny

Promoted from 2019 J.F.C.

- Clann na nGael - (Junior 'A' Champions)
- Moylagh - (Junior 'A' Runners-up)

== Participating teams ==
The teams taking part in the 2020 Meath Intermediate Football Championship are:

Club	Location	Management	2019 Championship Position	2020 Championship Position
Ballinabrackey	Ballinabrackey	Gordon McDonnell	Preliminary Quarter-Finalist	Champions
Ballinlough	Ballinlough & Kilskyre	Kieran Shankey	Non Qualifier	Relegation Playoff
Bective	Navan	John Brady	Non Qualifier	Non-Qualifier
Blackhall Gaels	Batterstown and Kilcloon	Martin Whelan	Non Qualifier	Non-Qualifier
Castletown	Castletown	John Tiernan	Semi-Finalist	Relegated to 2021 JFC
Clann na nGael	Athboy and Rath Cairn	Tom Hanley	Junior 'A' Champions	Quarter-Finalist
Drumbaragh Emmets	Drumbaragh, Kells	Ciarán O'Malley	Non Qualifier	Relegation Playoff
Duleek/Bellewstown	Duleek & Bellewstown	Anthony Malone	Quarter-Finalist	Non-Qualifier
Dunderry	Dunderry	David Callaghan	Quarter-Finalist	Non-Qualifier
Kilmainham	Kilmainham, Kells	Martin McGovern	Non Qualifier	Semi-Finalist
Longwood	Longwood	David Flynn	Relegated from 2019 SFC	Non-Qualifier
Meath Hill	Meath Hill	Paddy Martin	Quarter-Finalist	Non-Qualifier
Moylagh	Moylagh	Kevin Dowd	Junior 'A' Runners-up	Non-Qualifier
Oldcastle	Oldcastle	Leo McEnroe	Semi-Finalist	Relegation Playoff
Rathkenny	Rathkenny and Stackallan	Dudley Farrell	Relegated from 2019 SFC	Non-Qualifier
St. Michael's	Carlanstown & Kilbeg	David Wright	Non Qualifier	Semi-Finalist
St. Patrick's	Stamullen	Mark Gibson	Relegated from 2019 SFC	Relegation Playoff
Syddan	Lobinstown	Davy Cahill	Non Qualifier	Non-Qualifier
Trim	St Lomans Park, Trim	Brendan Murphy	Finalists	Finalists
Walterstown	Navan	Martin O'Connell	Quarter-Finalist	Non-Qualifier

== Group stage ==
There are five groups of four teams called Group A, B, C, D and E. The 1st placed teams in Groups A, B and C automatically qualify for the semi-finals. The 1st placed teams in Groups D and E qualify for the quarter-final with the winner progressing to the semi-finals. The last placed teams in Groups A, B and C progress to the relegation Semi-Finals while the last placed teams in Groups D and E will playoff in a relegation Quarter-Final with the loser the playing in the relegation Semi-Finals. The losers of the relegation Semi-Finals playoff in the relegation final with the loser relegated to the 2021 Meath Junior Football Championship.

Tiebreakers: If two or more teams were equal on points on completion of the group matches, the following tie-breaking criteria would be applied:

All Football Championships and Leagues shall be run on a combination of a league and knockout basis under Rule 6.21 T.O. Where teams finish equal with points for qualification or relegation process for concluding stages, the positioning shall be decided as follows;

- (i) Where three teams are involved - the outcome of the meetings of the three teams in their previous games in the competition. If three teams finish level on points for three places and one team has beaten the other two teams that team qualifies in first place and other places are determined by the specified order. If there are two positions and one team has beaten the other two teams that team qualifies and the second place is determined by the specified order. If there is one position and one team has beaten the other two team that team qualifies;
- (ii) Where two teams are involved - the outcome of the meeting of the two teams in the previous game in the competition;
- (iii) Scoring Difference;
- (iv) Highest total scores for;
- (v) A play-off.

=== Group A ===
Team	Pld	W	L	D	PF	PA	PD	Pts
Trim	3	3	0	0	58	31	+27	6
Rathkenny	3	1	1	1	51	42	+9	3
Bective	3	1	2	0	33	56	-23	2
Drumbaragh Emmets	3	0	2	1	42	55	-13	1

Round 1

- Bective 2-10, 2-7 Drumbaragh, Cortown, 31/7/2020,
- Trim 3-8, 0-10 Rathkenny, Pairc Tailteann, 2/8/2020,

Round 2

- Rathkenny 2-17, 0-7 Bective, Kilmainham, 15/8/2020,
- Trim 2-15, 1-8 Drumbaragh, Bohermeen, 16/8/2020,

Round 3

- Drumbaragh 3–9, 2-12 Rathkenny, Kilmainham, 29/8/2020,
- Trim 2-14, 0-10 Bective, Clonard, 29/8/2020,

=== Group B ===
Team	Pld	W	L	D	PF	PA	PD	Pts
St. Michael's	3	3	0	0	62	44	+18	6
Walterstown	3	2	1	0	55	49	+6	4
Moylagh	3	1	2	0	39	50	-11	2
St. Patrick's	3	0	3	0	42	55	-13	0

Round 1

- Walterstown 0-16, 1-11 Moylagh, Carlanstown, 31/7/2020,
- St. Michael's 1-15, 2-11 St. Patrick's, Walterstown, 1/8/2020,

Round 2

- Walterstown 1-21, 2-11 St. Patrick's, Ratoath, 14/8/2020,
- St. Michael's 4-14, 1-9 Moylagh, Carnaross, 16/8/2020,

Round 3

- Moylagh 0-13, 0-8 St. Patrick's, Slane, 29/8/2020,
- St. Michael's 2-12, 0-15 Walterstown, Pairc Tailteann, 29/8/2020,

=== Group C ===
Team	Pld	W	L	D	PF	PA	PD	Pts
Kilmainham	2	2	0	0	34	30	+4	4
Dunderry	3	2	1	0	54	39	+15	4
Blackhall Gaels	3	1	2	0	53	44	+9	2
Castletown	2	0	2	0	16	44	-28	0

Note: Game between Kilmainham and Castletown not played and would not affect final standings. Kilmainham ranked ahead of Dunderry due to head-to-head result.

Round 1

- Kilmainham 2-11, 0-15 Dunderry, Bohermeen, 1/8/2020,
- Blackhall Gaels 3-13, 0-10 Castletown, Trim, 1/8/2020,

Round 2

- Dunderry 2-16, 0-6 Castletown, Pairc Tailteann, 15/8/2020,
- Kilmainham 2-11, 1-12 Blackhall Gaels, Dunsany, 16/8/2020,

Round 3

- Kilmainham v Castletown - Not Played
- Dunderry 2-11, 1-13 Blackhall Gaels, Summerhill, 30/8/2020,

=== Group D ===
Team	Pld	W	L	D	PF	PA	PD	Pts
Ballinabrackey	3	2	0	1	66	20	+46	5
Duleek/Bellewstown	3	1	0	2	54	51	+3	4
Syddan	3	1	1	1	43	61	-18	3
Oldcastle	3	0	3	0	29	60	-31	0

Round 1

- Syddan 1-11, 2-5 Oldcastle, Nobber, 1/8/2020,
- Duleek/Bellewstown 1–12, 2-9 Ballinabrackey, Trim, 1/8/2020,

Round 2

- Duleek/Bellewstown 1-14, 1-11 Oldcastle, Simonstown, 15/8/2020,
- Ballinabrackey 3-16, 0-4 Syddan, Summerhill, 15/8/2020,

Round 3

- Syddan 3–16, 5-10 Duleek/Bellewstown, Drumconrath, 29/8/2020,
- Ballinabrackey 3-20, 0-4 Oldcastle, Pairc Tailteann, 29/8/2020.

=== Group E ===
Team	Pld	W	L	D	PF	PA	PD	Pts
Clann na nGael	3	3	0	0	54	37	+17	6
Meath Hill	3	2	1	0	46	45	+1	4
Longwood	3	1	2	0	47	47	+0	2
Ballinlough	3	0	3	0	43	61	-18	0

Round 1

- Meath Hill 0-16, 1-11 Longwood, Pairc Tailteann, 1/8/2020,
- Clann na nGael 3-13, 1-10 Ballinlough, Pairc Tailteann, 4/8/2020,

Round 2

- Meath Hill 2-14, 0-14 Ballinlough, Nobber, 15/8/2020,
- Clann na nGael 2-9, 2-8 Longwood, Clonard, 16/8/2020,

Round 3

- Clann na nGael 3-8, 1-7 Meath Hill, Bective, 30/8/2020,
- Longwood 1-16, 1-13 Ballinlough, Bohermeen, 30/8/2020,

== Knock-out stage ==
The 1st placed teams in Groups A, B and C qualify for the semi-finals. The 1st place teams in Groups D and E qualify for the quarter-final with the winner progressing to the semi-finals

Quarter-Final
Ballinabrackey	1-14
Clann na nGael	0-09

Semi-Finals
Ballinabrackey	3-13
St. Michael's	1-13
Trim	4-18
Kilmainham	1-9

Final
Ballinabrackey	0-16
Trim	1-12

=== Quarter-final ===
13 September 2020	Ballinabrackey	1-14 (17) – (9) 0-09	Clann na nGael	Navan
13:00 IST (UTC+1)				Venue: Pairc Tailteann
		Report		Referee: Patrick Coyle

=== Semi-finals ===
20 September 2020 Semi-Final	Ballinabrackey	3-13 (22) – (16) 1-13	St. Michael's	Navan
15:30 IST (UTC+1)				Venue: Pairc Tailteann
		Report		Referee: Padraic Coyle

19 September 2020 Semi-Final	Trim	4-18 (30) – (12) 1-9	Kilmainham	Navan
15:30 IST (UTC+1)				Venue: Pairc Tailteann
		Report		Referee: Andrew Smith

=== Final ===
3 October 2020 Final	Ballinabrackey	0-16 (16) – (15) 1-12	Trim	Navan
17:00 IST (UTC+1)				Venue: Pairc Tailteann
		Report		Referee: Patrick Coyle

== Relegation play-off ==
The 4th placed teams in each group contest the relegation playoff. The 4th placed teams from groups D and E compete in the relegation Quarter-Final. The loser of the relegation Quarter-Final proceeds to the relegation Semi-Finals along with the 4th placed teams from groups A, B and C. The losers of the relegation Semi-Finals will then contest the relegation final. The loser of the relegation final will be relegated to the Junior Football Championship while all other teams retain their Intermediate status.

=== Relegation quarter-final ===
6 September 2020 Relegation Quarter-Final	Oldcastle	1-14 (17) – (13) 1-10	Ballinlough	Moylagh
		Report

=== Relegation semi-finals ===
19 September 2020 Relegation Semi-Final	Ballinlough	3-6 (15) – (13) 1-10	St. Patrick's	Bective
16:30 IST (UTC+1)
		Report		Referee: Martin Dawson

20 September 2020 Relegation Semi-Final	Drumbaragh	3-16 (25) – (22) 4-10	Castletown	Moynalty
12:00 IST (UTC+1)
		Report		Referee: Kieran Olwell

=== Relegation final ===
3 October 2020 Relegation Final	St. Patrick's	2-11 (17) – (12) 1-9	Castletown	Donore
19:00 IST (UTC+1)
		Report		Referee: Cormac Reilly
