= 2020 Meath Senior Football Championship =

Football league season

128th Meath Senior Football Championship
Tournament details
- County: Meath
- Province: Leinster
- Year: 2020
- Trophy: Keegan Cup
- Sponsor: Fairyhouse Steel
- Date: 31 July - 4 October
- Teams: 16
- Defending champions: Ratoath

Winners
- Champions: Ratoath (2nd win)
- Manager: Brian Farrell
- Captain: Brian McMahon

Runners-up
- Runners-up: Gaeil Colmcille
- Manager: Lar Wall

Other
- Matches played: 30
- Website: Meath GAA

The 2020 Meath Senior Football Championship was the 128th edition of the Meath GAA's premier club Gaelic football tournament for senior clubs in County Meath, Ireland with 16 teams competing. The winner did not represent Meath in the Leinster Senior Club Football Championship as the GAA made the decision to cancel the 2020 Provincial and All-Ireland Club Championships due to the impact of the COVID-19 pandemic on Gaelic games. The championship starts with a group stage and then progresses to a knock out stage.

Ratoath were the defending champions after they defeated Summerhill in the 2019 final to claim their first ever S.F.C. crown.

This was Nobber's return to the top flight after six years in the Intermediate grade, after claiming the 2019 I.F.C. title.

The draw for the group stages of the championship were made on 21 June 2020 with the games commencing on 31 July 2020.

On 4 October 2020, Ratoath retained the Keegan Cup after defeating Gaeil Colmcille 1–14 to 1–13 in the final. Joey Wallace, who scored the winning goal in the 8th minute of injury time, was awarded the Man of the Match award.

== Format and structure changes ==
Originally, the 2020 Meath S.F.C. was planned to consist of 16 teams drawn in rotation into four groups each containing four teams. The top two teams would progress to the quarter-finals, while the bottom two in each group would contest the Relegation Quarter-Finals.

The public health measures introduced to combat the COVID-19 pandemic resulted in the competition being delayed with a slight change to the format. Instead of commencing in the usual April period, the championship was pushed back to the end of July. While the format remained with the 16 senior clubs being drawn in rotation into four groups each containing four teams, only the top team in each group will progress to the semi-finals. Additionally, only the bottom team in each group will contest the Relegation Semi-Finals, the losers of which will play-off for the right to retain their senior status into 2021.

== Team changes ==
The following teams changed division since the 2019 championship season.

=== To S.F.C. ===
Promoted from 2019 I.F.C.

- Nobber - (Intermediate Champions)

=== From S.F.C. ===
Relegated to 2020 I.F.C.

- Longwood
- Rathkenny
- St. Patrick's

== Participating teams ==
The teams taking part in the 2020 Meath Senior Football Championship were:

Club	Location	Management	Pre C'ship Odds	2019 Championship Position	2020 Championship Position
Curraha	Curraha	Tom Rooney	25/1	Preliminary Quarter-Final	Relegation Play-Off
Donaghmore/Ashbourne	Ashbourne	Mick Deegan	12/1	Quarter-Finalist	Non Qualifier
Dunshaughlin	Dunshaughlin & Drumree	Martin Reilly	25/1	Quarter-Finalist	Relegation Playoff
Gaeil Colmcille	Kells	Lar Wall	7/1	Semi-Finalist	Finalist
Moynalvey	Moynalvey & Kiltale	Sean Duggan	1/10	Non Qualifier	Non Qualifier
Na Fianna	Enfield & Baconstown	Michael Foley	20/1	Quarter-Finalist	Semi-Finalist
Navan O'Mahonys	Navan	Davy Nelson	11/1	Non Qualifier	Non Qualifier
Nobber	Nobber	Sean Carolan	66/1	I.F.C. Champions	Relegated
Ratoath	Ratoath	Brian Farrell	2/1	Champions	Champions
Seneschalstown	Kentstown & Yellow Furze	Joe Cowley	33/1	Relegation Play-Off	Relegation Play-Off
Simonstown Gaels	Navan	Des Lane	11/2	Semi-Finalist	Non Qualifier
Skryne	Skryne & Tara	Mickey Johnson	20/1	Quarter-Finalist	Non Qualifier
St. Colmcille's	Bettystown, Donacarney, Laytown & Mornington	Micky Conlon	50/1	Relegation Play-Off	Non Qualifier
St. Peter's Dunboyne	Dunboyne	Conor O'Donoghue	9/2	Non-Qualifier	Non Qualifier
Summerhill	Summerhill	Declan McCabe	6/1	Finalist	Semi-Finalist
Wolfe Tones	Kilberry, Gibbstown, Oristown & Wilkinstown	Michael McDermott	25/1	Relegation Play-Off	Non Qualifier

== Group stage ==
There are four groups of four teams called Group A, B, C and D. The 1st placed teams in each group qualify for the semi-finals. The 4th placed team in each group will proceed to the Relegation Play-Off to determine which team will suffer relegation.

The draw for the group stages of the championship were made on 21 June 2020 with the games commencing on 31 July 2020.

Tiebreakers: If two or more teams were equal on points on completion of the group matches, the following tie-breaking criteria would be applied:

All Football Championships and Leagues shall be run on a combination of a league and knockout basis under Rule 6.21 T.O. Where teams finish equal with points for qualification or relegation process for concluding stages, the positioning shall be decided as follows;

- (i) Where three teams are involved - the outcome of the meetings of the three teams in their previous games in the competition. If three teams finish level on points for three places and one team has beaten the other two teams that team qualifies in first place and other places are determined by the specified order. If there are two positions and one team has beaten the other two teams that team qualifies and the second place is determined by the specified order. If there is one position and one team has beaten the other two team that team qualifies;
- (ii) Where two teams are involved - the outcome of the meeting of the two teams in the previous game in the competition;
- (iii) Scoring Difference;
- (iv) Highest total scores for;
- (v) A play-off.

=== Group A ===
Team	Pld	W	L	D	PF	PA	PD	Pts
Summerhill	3	3	0	0	43	37	+6	6
Wolfe Tones	3	2	1	0	57	39	+18	4
Moynalvey	3	1	2	0	55	61	-6	2
Curraha	3	0	3	0	44	62	-18	0

Round 1

- Summerhill 0-17, 1-12 Moynalvey, Trim, 31/7/2020,
- Wolfe Tones 4-11, 0-12 Curraha, Bective, 1/8/2020,

Round 2

- Moynalvey 5-10, 4-8 Curraha, Skryne, 15/8/2020,
- Summerhill 2-6, 0-10 Wolfe Tones, Pairc Tailteann, 16/8/2020,

Round 3

- Wolfe Tones 5-9, 0-15 Moynalvey, Skryne, 28/8/2020,
- Summerhill 2-8, 2-6 Curraha, Ashbourne, 28/8/2020,

=== Group B ===
Team	Pld	W	L	D	PF	PA	PD	Pts
Na Fianna	3	2	1	0	50	38	+12	4
Donaghmore/Ashbourne	3	2	1	0	42	37	+5	4
Navan O'Mahonys	3	1	2	0	38	49	-11	2
Seneschalstown	3	1	2	0	43	49	-6	2

- Donaghmore/Ashbourne 1-12, 0-12 Navan O'Mahonys, Skryne, 31/7/2020,
- Seneschalstown 2-13, 1-12 Na Fianna, Pairc Tailteann, 1/8/2020,

Round 2

- Donaghmore/Ashbourne 2-13, 1-8 Seneschalstown, Skryne, 14/8/2020,
- Na Fianna 3-12, 0-11 Navan O'Mahonys, Trim, 15/8/2020,

Round 3

- Navan O'Mahonys 1-12, 1-10 Seneschalstown, Dunshaughlin, 29/8/2020,
- Na Fianna 0-14, 0-8 Donaghmore/Ashbourne, Trim, 29/8/2020,

=== Group C ===
Team	Pld	W	L	D	PF	PA	PD	Pts
Ratoath	3	3	0	0	60	30	+30	6
Simonstown Gaels	3	1	2	0	47	44	+3	2
Skryne	3	1	2	0	44	42	+2	2
Nobber	3	1	2	0	46	81	-35	2

- Ratoath 5-21, 2-6 Nobber, Skryne, Pairc Tailteann, 31/7/2020,
- Simonstown Gaels 1-14, 0-11 Skryne, Pairc Tailteann, 2/8/2020,

Round 2

- Nobber 2-16, 0-20 Simonstown Gaels, Castletown, 14/8/2020,
- Ratoath 1-10, 1-5 Skryne, Dunshaughlin, 16/8/2020,

Round 3

- Skryne 4-13, 0-12 Nobber, Seneschalstown, 30/8/2020,
- Ratoath 0-11, 0-10 Simonstown Gaels, Pairc Tailteann, 30/8/2020,

=== Group D ===
Team	Pld	W	L	D	PF	PA	PD	Pts
Gaeil Colmcille	3	3	0	0	58	46	+12	6
St. Peter's Dunboyne	3	2	1	0	60	35	+25	4
St. Colmcille's	3	1	2	0	39	56	-17	2
Dunshaughlin	3	0	3	0	40	60	-20	0

- Gaeil Colmcille 1-17, 1-12 St. Colmcille's, Drumconrath, 1/8/2020,
- St. Peter's Dunboyne 4-12, 0-9 Dunshaughlin, Ashbourne, 1/8/2020,

Round 2

- St. Colmcille's 2-9, 1-10 Dunshaughlin, Seneschalstown, 15/8/2020,
- Gaeil Colmcille 3-8, 0-13 St. Peter's Dunboyne, Pairc Tailteann, 16/8/2020,

Round 3

- Gaeil Colmcille 2-15, 1-15 Dunshaughlin, Walterstown, 30/8/2020,
- St. Peter's Dunboyne 4-11, 1-6 St. Colmcille's, Stamullen, 30/8/2020,

== Knock-out stage ==
The 1st placed teams in each group qualified for the semi-finals.

Semi-Finals		Final
Summerhill	1-9
Ratoath	1-14	Ratoath	1-14
Na Fianna	0-13	Gaeil Colmcille	1-13
Gaeil Colmcille	2-15

=== Semi-finals ===
19 September 2020 Semi-Final 1	Summerhill	1-9 (12) – (17) 1-14	Ratoath	Navan
17:30 IST (UTC+1)		(HT: 1-5 - 0-7)		Venue: Pairc Tailteann
		Report		Referee: Cormac Reilly

20 September 2020 Semi-Final 1	Na Fianna	0-13 (13) – (21) 2-15	Gaeil Colmcille	Navan
16:00 IST (UTC+1)		(HT: 0-9 - 0-6)		Venue: Pairc Tailteann
		Report		Referee: David Coldrick

=== Final ===
4 October 2020 Final	Ratoath	1-14 (17) – (16) 1-13	Gaeil Colmcille	Navan
14:15 IST (UTC+1)		(HT: 0-6 - 0-9)		Venue: Pairc Tailteann
		Report		Referee: David Coldrick; TV: TG4

== Relegation play-off ==
The relegation play-off consisted of the 4th-placed finishers in each group. The three winners retained their senior status while the outright loser was relegated to the Intermediate championship for 2021.

=== Relegation semi-finals ===
19 September 2020 Relegation Semi-Final 1	Curraha	1-11 (14) – (11) 0-11	Nobber	Walterstown
17:00 IST (UTC+1)

18 September 2020 Relegation Semi-Final 2	Seneschalstown	2-18 (24) – (15) 2-9	Dunshaughlin	Skryne
20:00 IST (UTC+1)

=== Relegation Final ===
3 October 2020 Relegation Final	Nobber	3-5 (14) – (25) 2-19	Dunshaughlin	Navan
13:00 IST (UTC+1)		(HT: 3-3 - 1-9)		Venue: Pairc Tailteann
		Report		Referee: David Gough
