= 2016 Meath Senior Football Championship =

Meath S.F.C.
- Season: 2016
- Champions: Simonstown Gaels (1st title)
- Relegated: Ballinlough
- All Ireland SCFC: n/a
- Winning Captain: Joe Lyons
- Man of the Match: Padraig McKeever
- Winning Manager: Colm O'Rourke
- Leinster SCFC: Simonstown Gaels
- Matches: 56

The 2016 Meath Senior Football Championship was the 124th edition of the Meath GAA's premier club Gaelic football tournament for senior clubs in County Meath, Ireland. Eighteen teams competed, with the winner representing Meath in the Leinster Senior Club Football Championship. The championship started with a group stage and then progressed to a knock out stage.

Navan O'Mahonys were the defending champions after they defeated Na Fianna in the 2015 final, however they failed to make it past the group stages, winning only one match out of five.

This was Ratoath's first ever period in the senior grade after claiming the 2015 Meath Intermediate Football Championship title.

This year saw the 9th "Navan El Classico" take place in the SFC as Simonstown Gaels and Navan O'Mahonys drew in the group stage, leaving their overall head-to-head score as 5-3 in favour of O'Mahonys and 1 draw.

Ballinlough were relegated back the 2017 I.F.C. after losing the Relegation Play-off series, and thus ending their 2 year tenure in the top flight.

On 30 October 2016 Simonstown Gaels claimed their first ever S.F.C. title when defeating Donaghmore/Ashbourne in Pairc Tailteann on a scoreline of 1-14 to 0-8. Joe Lyons lifted the Keegan Cup for the north Navan side while Padraig McKeever claimed the "Man-of-the-Match" award. In his 18th season playing for Simonstown, 36 year old Séamus Kenny earned his first S.F.C. medal.

The draw for the group stages of the championship were made on 8 February 2016 with the games commencing on the weekend of 9 April 2016.

== Format change proposals rejected ==
Due to the lack of success of the Meath Senior football team in the previous few years, it was proposed to make the club championships more competitive by reducing the number of teams in each tier of the championship and then the number of teams in each group to provide more 'do-or-die' matches which in turn would provide more competitiveness. On 18 January, the decision was made to cut the number of Senior clubs to 16 in 2017. This means that 3 of the 18 clubs would be relegated at the end of the 2016 season while the 2016 I.F.C. champions would make up the top 16. In 2017, the 16 teams will compete in 4 groups of 4.

However on 21 March, a proposal from the Slane club to retain the status-quo format was accepted by 40 to 14 votes.

== Team changes ==
The following teams have changed division since the 2015 championship season.

=== To S.F.C. ===
Promoted from I.F.C.

- Ratoath - (Intermediate Champions)

=== From S.F.C. ===
Relegated to I.F.C.

- Walterstown

== Participating teams ==
The teams taking part in the 2016 Meath Senior Football Championship are:

| Club | Location | Pre C'ship Odds | 2015 Championship Position | 2016 Championship Position |
|---|---|---|---|---|
| Ballinlough | Ballinlough & Kilskyre | 66/1 | Non Qualifier | Relegated |
| Blackhall Gaels | Batterstown & Kilcloon | 66/1 | Non Qualifier | Non Qualifier |
| Donaghmore/Ashbourne | Ashbourne | 9/2 | Quarter-Finalist | Finalist |
| Duleek/Bellewstown | Bellewstown & Duleek | 66/1 | Non Qualifier | Relegation Playoff |
| Dunshaughlin | Dunshaughlin & Drumree | 40/1 | Quarter-Finalist | Preliminary Quarter-Finalist |
| Gaeil Colmcille | Kells | 22/1 | Semi Finalist | Semi Finalist |
| Moynalvey | Moynalvey & Kiltale | 66/1 | Non Qualifier | Non Qualifier |
| Na Fianna | Enfield & Baconstown | 8/1 | Finalists | Quarter-Finalist |
| Navan O'Mahonys | Navan | 11/8 | Champions | Non Qualifier |
| Rathkenny | Rathkenny & Stackallan | 66/1 | Relegation Playoff | Non Qualifier |
| Ratoath | Ratoath | 5/1 | Intermediate Champions | Non Qualifier |
| Seneschalstown | Kentstown & Yellow Furze | 50/1 | Non Qualifier | Quarter-Finalist |
| Simonstown Gaels | Navan | 12/1 | Non Qualifier | Champions |
| Skryne | Skryne & Tara | 25/1 | Preliminary Quarter-Finalist | Semi Finalist |
| St. Patrick's | Gormanston, Julianstown & Stamullen | 33/1 | Relegation Playoff | Non Qualifier |
| St. Peter's Dunboyne | Dunboyne | 14/1 | Semi Finalist | Quarter-Finalist |
| Summerhill | Summerhill | 12/1 | Quarter-Finalist | Quarter-Finalist |
| Wolfe Tones | Kilberry, Gibbstown, Oristown & Wilkinstown | 16/2 | Quarter-Finalist | Relegation Playoff |

== Group stage ==
There are three groups of six teams called Group A, B and C. The 2 top finishers in each group and the third-place finisher in Group A will qualify for the Quarter Finals. The third placed teams in Group B and C will qualify for a Preliminary Quarter Final, with the winner earning a place in last eight. The bottom finishers of each group will qualify for the Relegation Play Off. The draw for the group stages of the championship were made on 8 February 2016 with the games commencing on the weekend of 9 April 2016.

=== Group A ===
| Team | Pld | W | L | D | PF | PA | PD | Pts |
|---|---|---|---|---|---|---|---|---|
| Seneschalstown | 5 | 5 | 0 | 0 | 74 | 58 | +16 | 10 |
| Skryne | 5 | 3 | 1 | 1 | 78 | 67 | +11 | 7 |
| Gaeil Colmcille | 5 | 2 | 2 | 1 | 72 | 61 | +11 | 5 |
| Blackhall Gaels | 5 | 2 | 3 | 0 | 54 | 72 | -18 | 4 |
| Rathkenny | 5 | 2 | 3 | 0 | 66 | 67 | -1 | 4 |
| Ballinlough | 5 | 0 | 5 | 0 | 53 | 72 | -19 | 0 |

Round 1

- Seneschalstown 2-9, 0-12 Rathkenny, Skryne, 8/4/2016,
- Skryne 1-15, 0-7 Blackhall Gaels, Duleek, 8/4/2016,
- Gaeil Colmcille 0-16, 0-6 Ballinlough, Pairc Tailteann, 10/4/2016,

Round 2

- Rathkenny 1-12, 1-10 Gaeil Colmcille, Bohermeen, 13/5/2016,
- Seneschalstown 2-15, 0-15 Skryne, Pairc Tailteann, 13/5/2016,
- Blackhall Gaels 2-9, 1-11 Ballinlough, Kildalkey, 6/8/2016,

Round 3

- Seneschalstown 0-15, 0-13 Gaeil Colmcille, Syddan, 6/8/2016,
- Blackhall Gaels 1-9, 0-11 Rathkenny, Kildalkey, 13/8/2016,
- Skryne 2-9, 1-10 Ballinlough, Trim, 14/8/2016,

Round 4

- Rathkenny 1-13, 1-8 Ballinlough, Pairc Tailteann, 20/8/2016,
- Seneschalstown 1-10 0-9 Blackhall Gaels, Skryne, 20/8/2016,
- Skryne 2-8, 1-11 Gaeil Colmcille, Pairc Tailteann, 21/8/2016,

Round 5

- Seneschalstown 0-10, 0-9 Ballinlough, Castletown, 23/9/2016,
- Skryne 3-7, 1-9 Rathkenny, Pairc Tailteann, 25/9/2016,
- Gaeil Colmcille 3-7, 1-8 Blackhall Gaels, Walterstown, 25/9/2016,

=== Group B ===
| Team | Pld | W | L | D | PF | PA | PD | Pts |
|---|---|---|---|---|---|---|---|---|
| St. Peter's Dunboyne | 5 | 4 | 1 | 0 | 97 | 62 | +35 | 8 |
| Summerhill | 5 | 4 | 1 | 0 | 84 | 59 | +25 | 8 |
| Donaghmore/Ashbourne | 5 | 3 | 2 | 0 | 78 | 54 | +24 | 6 |
| Ratoath | 5 | 2 | 3 | 0 | 82 | 72 | +10 | 4 |
| St Patrick's | 5 | 1 | 3 | 1 | 53 | 83 | -30 | 3 |
| Duleek/Bellewstown | 5 | 0 | 4 | 1 | 49 | 113 | -64 | 1 |

Round 1

- St. Peter's Dunboyne 3-21, 3-4 Duleek/Bellewstown, Ratoath, 9/4/2016,
- Summerhill 2-8, 0-13 Ratoath, Dunshaughlin, 10/4/2016,
- Donaghmore/Ashbourne 1-9, 0-7 St. Patrick's, Pairc Tailteann, 16/4/2016,

Round 2

- Duleek/Bellewstown 0-11, 0-11 St. Patrick's, Seneschalstown, 14/5/2016,
- Summerhill 1-11, 0-12 Donaghmore/Ashbourne, Pairc Tailteann, 15/5/2016,
- St. Peter's Dunboyne 2-15, 1-8 Ratoath, Ashbourne, 7/8/2016,

Round 3

- Donaghmore/Ashbourne 3-18, 0-6 Duleek/Bellewstown, Stamullen, 12/8/2016,
- Ratoath 0-19, 1-8 St. Patrick's, Duleek, 13/8/2016,
- St. Peter's Dunboyne 0-17, 1-8 Summerhill, Dunshaughlin, 14/8/2016,

Round 4

- St. Patrick's 0-16, 1-12 St. Peter's Dunboyne, Duleek, 20/8/2016,
- Summerhill 1-16, 0-9 Duleek/Bellewstown, Dunsany, 21/8/2016,
- Donaghmore/Ashbourne 2-10, 0-13 Ratoath, Stamullen, 21/8/2016,

Round 5

- Ratoath 4-14, 0-10 Duleek/Bellewstown, Skryne, 23/9/2016,
- Summerhill 4-14, 0-8 St. Patrick's, Ratoath, 24/9/2016,
- St. Peter's Dunboyne 1-11, 1-8 Donaghmore/Ashbourne, Pairc Tailteann, 24/9/2016,

=== Group C ===
| Team | Pld | W | L | D | PF | PA | PD | Pts |
|---|---|---|---|---|---|---|---|---|
| Na Fianna | 5 | 3 | 1 | 1 | 84 | 80 | +4 | 7 |
| Simonstown Gaels | 5 | 2 | 1 | 2 | 82 | 66 | +16 | 6 |
| Dunshaughlin | 5 | 3 | 2 | 0 | 80 | 66 | +14 | 6 |
| Navan O'Mahonys | 5 | 1 | 2 | 2 | 67 | 68 | -1 | 4 |
| Moynalvey | 5 | 2 | 3 | 0 | 71 | 94 | -23 | 4 |
| Wolfe Tones | 5 | 1 | 3 | 1 | 72 | 82 | -10 | 3 |

Round 1

- Simonstown Gaels 1-10, 0-13 Wolfe Tones, Pairc Tailteann, 9/4/2016,
- Na Fianna 0-16, 1-12 Dunshaughlin, Trim, 9/4/2016,
- Navan O'Mahonys 1-13, 1-7 Moynalvey, Trim, 10/4/2016,

Round 2

- Na Fianna 2-12, 2-12 Navan O'Mahonys, Trim, 13/5/2016,
- Moynalvey 1-16, 2-12 Simonstown Gaels, Skryne, 14/5/2016,
- Dunshaughlin 0-16, 1-12 Wolfe Tones, Pairc Tailteann, 5/8/2016,

Round 3

- Navan O'Mahonys 1-12, 1-12 Simonstown Gaels, Pairc Tailteann, 7/8/2016,
- Dunshaughlin 3-17, 2-3 Moynalvey, Skryne, 13/8/2016,
- Na Fianna 3-15, 0-15 Wolfe Tones, Pairc Tailteann, 14/8/2016,

Round 4

- Wolfe Tones 1-10, 0-8 Navan O'Mahonys, Pairc Tailteann, 20/8/2016,
- Simonstown Gaels 1-13, 0-11 Dunshaughlin, Trim, 21/8/2016,
- Na Fianna 0-18, 1-9 Moynalvey, Summerhill, 21/8/2016,

Round 5

- Dunshaughlin 0-12, 1-7 Navan O'Mahonys, Skryne, 25/9/2016,
- Moynalvey 2-15, 0-16 Wolfe Tones, Summerhill, 25/9/2016,
- Simonstown Gaels 3-11, 0-8 Na Fianna, Trim, 25/9/2016,

== Knock-out stage ==
The winners and runners up of the three groups and the third placed team of Group A automatically qualify for the quarter finals. The third placed teams in Groups B and C play off to determine the team that completes the quarter final lineup.

Preliminary Round
Donaghmore/Ashbourne | 1-17
Dunshaughlin | 1-10

Quarter-Finals
Seneschalstown | 0-5
Donaghmore/Ashbourne | 2-16
Skryne | 1-11
Summerhill | 0-9
St. Peter's Dunboyne | 1-17 (A.E.T.)
Simonstown Gaels | 3-16 (A.E.T.)
Na Fianna | 0-15
Gaeil Colmcille | 2-18

Semi-Finals
Donaghmore/Ashbourne | 1-9
Skryne | 0-8
Simonstown Gaels | 0-14
Gaeil Colmcille | 0-12

Final
Donaghmore/Ashbourne | 0-8
Simonstown Gaels | 1-14

Preliminary Quarter-Final:

- Donaghmore/Ashbourne 1-17, 1-10 Dunshaughlin, Pairc Tailteann, 2/10/2016,

Quarter-Finals:

- Skryne 1-11, 0-9 Summerhill, Ashbourne, 2/10/2016,
- Simonstown Gaels 3-16, 1-17 St. Peter's Dunboyne, Trim, 8/10/2016, (A.E.T.)
- Donaghmore/Ashbourne 2-16, 0-5 Seneschalstown, Pairc Tailteann, 9/10/2016,
- Gaeil Colmcille 2-18, 0-15 Na Fianna, Trim, 9/10/2016,

Semi-Finals:

- Simonstown Gaels 0-14, 0-12 Gaeil Colmcille, Pairc Tailteann, 15/10/2016,
- Donaghmore/Ashbourne 1-9, 0-8 Skryne, Pairc Tailteann, 16/10/2016,

Final:

30 October 2016
15:00pm
Final

| Simonstown Gaels | 1-14 - 0-8 | Donaghmore/Ashbourne |
|---|---|---|
| P. McKeever 0-6 (4f), J. Lyons 1-0, S. O'Rourke, C. Nash 0-2 each, C. Sheridan ('45), B. McGrath , M. Brennan and S. Kenny 0-1 each. | Report | M. Deegan 0-3 (2f), A. Tormey 0-2, D. Brady 0-1, C. Carey 0-1, J. Colgan 0-1. |

Pairc Tailteann, Meath
Attendance: ???
Referee: Cormac Reilly (St. Mary's Donore)

== Relegation play-off group ==
The three bottom teams from each group entered the relegation play-off group and played each other in a round robin basis.

The team with the worst record after two matches was relegated to the 2017 Intermediate Championship.

| Team | Pld | W | L | D | PF | PA | PD | Pts |
|---|---|---|---|---|---|---|---|---|
| Wolfe Tones | 1 | 1 | 0 | 0 | 23 | 11 | +12 | 2 |
| Duleek/Bellewstown | 1 | 1 | 0 | 0 | 11 | 9 | +2 | 2 |
| Ballinlough | 2 | 0 | 2 | 0 | 20 | 34 | -14 | 0 |

- Game 1: Duleek/Bellewstown 0-11, 1-6 Ballinlough, Castletown, 14/10/2016,
- Game 2: Wolfe Tones 2-17, 1-8 Ballinlough, Carlanstown, 21/10/2016,

== Leinster Senior Club Football Championship ==
Quarter Final:

Rhode 1-12, 1-9 Simonstown, O'Connor Park, 13/11/2016,
