= Meath Minor Football Championship =

- Irish: Craobh Mionúir; An Mhí
- Founded: 1924
- Trophy: Delaney Cup
- Title holders: St Colmcilles (6th title)
- First winner: De La Salle
- Most titles: De La Salle (19 titles)
- Sponsors: LMFM

The Meath Minor Football Championship is a Gaelic Athletic Association competition organised by the Meath Minor County Board for minor (under-18) Gaelic football clubs in County Meath, Ireland. The latest (2025) MFC Division 1 champions of Meath are St. Colmcilles they won the 2025 Meath Minor Football Championship Division 1 title after an intense 0-18 to 2-11 extra-time victory against Dunboyne at Ashbourne.

2017 was the final year of this competition with an under 18 age limit for minor grades – an under 17 championship replaced it after a vote at the GAA congress on 26 February 2016.

The trophy awarded to the winners is the Delaney Cup.

At the adjourned Meath GAA Annual Convention in the Pavilion at the Showgrounds, Navan on 13 April 1924, a dual proposal from Dulane F.C. and Kilcarn H.C. suggested the formation of a Minor Football competition, with the medals to be provided for the competition if five or more clubs compete. The proposal was intended to persuade the younger generation from engaging in foreign sports such as cricket. The motion was amended to set an age limit of 16 years for the first installment of the competition.

The draw for the inaugural Meath M.F.C. (conducted on Tuesday 13 May 1924) was as follows: A Division - Navan Harps -vs- De la Salle; Dulane -vs- Bohermeen; Commons -vs- Athlumney. B Division - Salesian College Warrenstown -vs- Curraha; Painestown -vs- Ardcath; Longwood -vs- Donaghmore; Duleek -vs- Walterstown.

== Meath M.F.C. Division 1 ==
=== M.F.C. Division 1 Roll of Honour ===
The Delany Cup was first presented in 1956 to Navan De la Salle by Mr. Eamon Delany of Laytown.

Year	Winner	Score	Opponent	
2024	Ratoath	0-18	Navan O'Mahonys	2-8
2023	St Peter’s Dunboyne	2-13	St Colmcille’s	2-12
2022	Donaghmore/Ashbourne	1-12	Seneschalstown	1-06
2021	St Colmcille's	1-12	Donaghmore/Ashbourne	1-08
2020	Dunshaughlin	3-12	St Colmcille's	2-08
2019	St Colmcille's	2-10	Summerhill	1-11
2018	Donaghmore/Ashbourne	4-11	St Colmcille's	0-12
2017	Ratoath	2-12	Na Fianna	0-12
2016	St Colmcille's	1-14	Na Fianna	0-13
2015	Summerhill	1-14	Skryne	1-09
2014	St. Peter's Dunboyne	2-06	St Colmcille's	1-06
2013	Donaghmore/Ashbourne	3-05	St. Peter's Dunboyne	0-07
2012	Ratoath	1-11	Donaghmore/Ashbourne	0-08
2011	Ratoath	0-11	Moynalvey	0-09
2010	Navan O'Mahony's	1-07	Ratoath	0-09
2009	Dunshaughlin	1-14	Donaghmore/Ashbourne	1-05
2008	Donaghmore/Ashbourne	4-04	Round Towers	1-02
2007	Donaghmore/Ashbourne	1-13	St Ciaran's	1-05
2006	Donaghmore/Ashbourne	2-08	Summerhill	2-07
2005	Summerhill	2-16	St Martin's	2-09
2004	Summerhill	0-10	Na Fianna	0-08
2003	Navan O'Mahony's	2-08	Summerhill	1-09
2002	St. Peter's Dunboyne	2-13	Wolfe Tones	1-08
2001	Navan O'Mahony's	3-20	St. Peter's Dunboyne	0-04
2000	Navan O'Mahony's	3-09	St Colmcille's	1-06
1999	Blackhall Gaels	2-10	Summerhill	1-04
1998	Walterstown	0-12	Dunderry	0-10
1997	St Cuthbert's	0-20	Walterstown	2-09
1996	St Cuthbert's	0-12	St. Peter's Dunboyne	0-07
1995	Simonstown Gaels	1-13	Oldcastle	1-08
1994	Round Towers	2-12	Killough Gaels	1-10
1993	Moynalvey/Kilcloon	1-05, 2-07 (R)	Simonstown Gaels	1-05, 0-10 (R)
1992	Moynalvey/Kilcloon	2-08	Gaeil Colmcille	0-02
1991	Moynalvey/Kilcloon	2-11	Duleek/Seneschalstown	0-08
1990	Simonstown Gaels	1-15	Ballivor/Athboy	1-02
1989	Duleek	2-03, 2-06 (R)	St. Martin's	0-09, 1-06 (R)
1988	Simonstown Gaels	0-09	Duleek	1-04
1987	St Martin's/Ratoath	0-05	Slane	0-04
1986	St Cuthbert's	4-09	Oldcastle	0-03
1985	St Cuthbert's	4-03	Oldcastle	1-04
1984	St Cuthbert's	1-09	Slane	1-03
1983	Duleek/St Colmcille's	2-05	St Cuthbert's	1-05
1982	Duleek/St Colmcille's	2-11	Trim	2-05
1981	Slane	2-06	Trim	1-02
1980	De la Salle	2-05	St Patrick's	0-06
1979	Donaghmore/Ratoath	1-08	De la Salle	2-04
1978	De la Salle	4-10	Ballivor	1-05
1977	Donaghmore/Ratoath	2-08	Kells	0-07
1976	De la Salle	5-08	Walterstown/Seneschalstown	0-02
1975	Walterstown/Seneschalstown	3-06	Duleek	0-07
1974	Skryne	1-05	Dee Rangers	1-04
1973	Skryne	3-06	Dee Rangers	1-05
1972	Trim	3-04	Dunshaughlin	0-09
1971	Walterstown	6-12	Moynalty	0-02
1970	De la Salle	5-04	Ratoath	0-02
1969	De la Salle		Trim	
1968	Trim	2-07	Walterstown	0-04
1967	Trim		Duleek	
1966	Boyne Emmets	2-04	Trim	1-05
1965	Gaeil Colmcille	1-09	De la Salle	0-09
1964	Boyne Emmets	0-09	Gaeil Colmcille	0-05
1963	De la Salle	4-03	Kells	1-01
1962	De la Salle	1-05	Castletown	0-00
1961	Castletown	4-01	Duleek	2-03
1960	Duleek	1-08	Kiltale	1-07
1959	Kells	2-05	Boyne Emmets	0-04
1958	Boyne Emmets	3-05	Kells	1-06
1957	Kilberry	1-06	Donaghmore	1-02
1956	De la Salle	3-05	Kilskyre	1-08
1955	Kilberry	2-05	Kilskyre	(2-01
1954	De la Salle	3-05	Trim	2-05
1953	De la Salle	2-07	St Kieran's	0-06
1952	De la Salle	4-05	Athboy	0-05
1951	Kells	2-01	De la Salle	1-03
1950	De la Salle	1-08	Trim	1-05
1949	Julianstown	3-03	Trim	3-01
1948	Julianstown	3-05	Kells St Colmcille's	1-04
1947	Julianstown		Dunshaughlin	
1946	Navan O'Growneys	0-19	Duleek	0-05
1945	Clann na Mídhe (Kilmainhamwood)	6-09	Navan O'Growneys	0-01
1944*	Clann na Mídhe (Kilmainhamwood)	0-07	Kells St Colmcille's	1-05
1943	Salesian College	4-13	Drumbaragh 0-01	
1942	Summerhill	6-07	De la Salle	1-03
1941	Duleek	9-04	Castletown	1-01
1940 *	Kells	1-03	De la Salle	2-02
1939	De la Salle	2-03 (R)	Donaghmore	2-03 (R)
1938	Donaghmore	3-03, 3-05 (R)	Kells	2-06, 1-01 (R)
1937	De la Salle	1-04, 5-05 (R)	Rathfeigh	2-01, 2-04 (R)
1936	Rathfeigh		Bettystown	
1935	Donaghmore		Erin's Own (Kells)	
1934	Erin's Own (Kells)	4-03	De la Salle	1-01
1933	Erin's Own (Kells)	3-04	De la Salle	1-04
1932	Donaghmore	(1-06)	Martry	(0-06)
1931	De la Salle	1-03, 2-02 (R)	Donaghmore	1-03, 1-04 (R)
1930	Erin's Own (Kells)		Syddan	
1929	De la Salle	3-03	Martry	0-03
1928 *	Commons	0-01	Kilbeg	1-04
1927	Kilbeg	1-04	Commons	1-03
1926	De la Salle	1-03	Carnaross	0-05
1925	De la Salle	4-07	Duleek	2-02
1924	De la Salle	3-02	Salesian College	2-00

- The 1944 final was awarded to Clann na Mídhe when it became known that Kells St. Colmcille's played an illegal (over-aged) player.
- The 1940 final was awarded to Kells after they objected to the final result.
- The 1928 final was awarded to the Commons club after it was found that Kilbeg fielded an unregistered player.

=== Meath M.F.C. Division 1 Top Winners ===
Club	Titles	Years won				
De la Salle	19	1924, 1925, 1926, 1929, 1931, 1937, 1939, 1950, 1952, 1953, 1954, 1956, 1962, 1963, 1969, 1970, 1976, 1978, 1980.				
Donaghmore/Ashbourne	9	1932, 1935, 1938, 2006, 2007, 2008, 2013, 2018, 2022				
St Cuthbert's	5	1984, 1985, 1986, 1996, 1997.				
Ratoath	4	2011, 2012, 2017, 2024				
Navan O'Mahony's	4	2000, 2001, 2003, 2010.				
Kells	4	1940, 1951, 1959, 1965.				
Summerhill	4	1942, 2004, 2005, 2015.				
St. Peter's Dunboyne	3	2002, 2014, 2023				
St Colmcille's	3	2016, 2019, 2021.				
Moynalvey/Kilcloon	3	1991, 1992, 1993				
Duleek	3	1941, 1960, 1989				
Trim	3	1967, 1968, 1972				
Boyne Emmets (Rathkenny, Slane & Seneschalstown)	3	1958, 1964, 1966				
Simonstown Gaels	3	1988, 1990, 1995				
Julianstown	3	1947, 1948, 1949				
Erin's Own (Kells)	3	1930, 1933, 1934				
Dunshaughlin	2	2009, 2020	-	Walterstown	2	1971, 1998
Duleek/St Colmcille's	2	1982, 1983.				
Donaghmore/Ratoath	2	1977, 1979				
Skryne	2	1973, 1974				
Kilberry	2	1955, 1957				
Gleann na Mí	2	1944, 1945				
Blackhall Gaels	1	1999				
Round Towers	1	1994				
St Martin's/Ratoath	1	1987.				
Slane	1	1981				
Walterstown/Seneschalstown	1	1975				
Castletown	1	1961				
O'Growney's (Navan)	1	1946				
Salesian College	1	1943				
Rathfeigh	1	1936				
The Commons	1	1928				
Kilbeg	1	1927				

- The 1944 final was awarded to Clann na Mídhe when it became known that Kells St Colmcille's played an illegal (over-aged) player.
- The 1940 final was awarded to Kells after they objected to the final result.

== MFC Division 2 Roll of Honour ==
This competition was known as the (Minor Football League) M.F.L. Division 2 before 2010.

Year	Winner	Score	Opponent	Score
2022	St. Peter's Dunboyne	1-13	Navan O'Mahony's	1-6
2021	Killary Emmets	1-13	Skryne	0-7
2020	Navan O'Mahony's	0-17	Donaghmore/Ashbourne	2-07
2019	Dunshaughlin	1-09	St. Peter's Dunboyne	1-08
2018	Dunshaughlin	1-12	North Meath Gaels	0-06
2017	Wolfe Tones	2-11, 4-12 (R)	Summerhill	0-14, 2-16 (R)
2016	St Vincent's/Curraha	2-13	St Oliver's	2-11
2015	Oldcastle	3-11	Jenkinstown Gaels	3-10
2014	Trim	5-08	Seneschalstown	1-06
2013	Trim	2-14	Killary Emmets	1-05
2012	St Vincent's/Curraha	2-15	Na Fianna	1-08
2011	Trim	1-10	Skryne	1-07
2010	St. Peter's Dunboyne	3-10	St Vincent's/Curraha	1-14
2009	Summerhill	2-06	Duleek/Bellewstown	1-08
2008	Skryne	2-10	Walterstown	0-06
2007	Round Towers	1-13	Walterstown	1-04
2006	Blackhall Gaels	3-08	Skryne	1-10
2005	Parnells	2-08	Wolfe Tones	2-07
2004	Parnells	2-12	St Colmcille's	1-12
2003	Simonstown Gaels	0-14	St Cuthbert's	3-04
2002	St Martin's	0-11, 3-05 (R)	Ratoath	2-05, 2-07 (R)
2001	St Cianan's	0-13	Dee Rangers	1-09
2000	Trim	2-09	St Ciaran's	1-08
1999	Wolfe Tones	1-10	St Ciarán's	0-09
1998	Drumconrath/Meath Hill	1-14	Trim	1-08
1997	St Ciaran's	2-07	Blackhall Gaels	1-05
1996	Walterstown	0-15 (R)	Parnells	1-09 (R)
1995	Trim	2-11	St Patrick's	1-07
1994	Wolfe Tones/St Michael's	3-06	Oldcastle	1-10
1993				
1992	Walterstown	1-07	St Patrick's	1-04
1991	Skryne	1-13	Clonard	0-08
1990	Wolfe Tones/St Michael's	1-07	Dee Rangers	0-08

== MFC Division 3 Roll of Honour ==
Year	Winner	Score	Opponent	Score
2022	Kilbride	2-18	Rathkenny	2-15
2021	Rathkenny/Slane	3-14	Ballinlough	3-06
2020	Ballinabrackey	2-15	Wolfe Tones	3-09
2019	Wolfe Tones	3-12	Ballinabrackey	2-10
2018	Summerhill	1-09	Oldcastle	0-11
2017	Oldcastle	5-14	Kilbride	3-13
2016	Clann na nGael	2-14	Ballivor/Boardsmill	2-07
2015	Seneschalstown	1-14	Duleek/Bellewstown	1-05
2014	Killary Emmets	2-09, 2-13 (R)	St Patrick's	2-09, 2-09 (R)
2013	Wolfe Tones	2-09	Rathkenny	1-07
2012	St Oliver's	3-11	Seneschalstown	1-04
2011	St Vincent's/Curraha	4-09	St Patrick's	1-10
2010	Duleek/Bellewstown	1-15	Clonard	1-09
2009				
2008	St Vincent's/Curraha	0-14	Dunsany	1-10
2007	St Vincent's/Curraha	3-10	Blackhall Gaels	1-15
2006	Blackfort Gaels	1-11	Na Fianna	1-10
2005	Blackfort Gaels	3-11	Skryne	3-10
2004	Dee Rangers	1-16	St Vincent's/Curraha	0-09
2003	Ballinlough	1-14 (R)	Longwood	1-11 (R)
2002	Dunsany	2-06	Ballinlough	0-08
2001	St Michael's	5-11	Walterstown	0-07
2000	St Patrick's	4-12	Na Fianna	0-04
1999	Dunsany	1-16	St Patrick's	2-09
1998	Wolfe Tones	2-10, 2-21, 3-18	Seneschalstown	3-07, 4-15, 3-17
1997	St Patrick's	1-11	Drumconrath/Meath Hill	2-05
1996	Drumconrath/Meath Hill	1-15	Athboy	3-07

== MFC Division 4 Roll of Honour ==
Year	Winner	Score	Opponent	Score	Notes
2022	Simonstown Gaels	0-20, 1-12 (R)	St. Ultans/Cortown Gaels	3-11, 1-9 (R)	
2021	Kilmainhamwood	5-7	Bective/Dunsany	2-7	
2020	Rathkenny/Slane	1-13	Ballinlough	1-10	
2019	Ballinlough	2-06	St Colmcille's 'B'	1-08	
2018	Kilbride	4-17	Na Fianna	4-10	
2017	St Michael's/Nobber	4-12	St Vincent's/Curraha	4-10	
2016	St Michael's/Nobber	3-12	Kilbride	2-09	
2015	Ballivor/Boardsmill	3-11	Gaeil Colmcille	3-10	
2014	Moynalty	3-09	Duleek/Bellewstown	0-05	
2013	Ballivor	4-17	Clann na nGael	1-09	
2012	Dunboyne/Kilbride 'B'	1-13	Killary Emmets	1-08	
2011	Seneschalstown	4-13	Moynalty	0-05	
2010					
2009					
2008	St Ciaran's	2-06	Moynalvey	1-08	Known as MFL Div 3B
2007	Inny Gaels		Dee Rangers		Known as MFL Div 3B
2006	St Vincent's Curraha	3-10	Bective	1-06	
2005					
2004	Ballinabrackey/Clonard	2-08	Drumconrath/Meath Hill	2-06	Known as MFL Div 3 Shield
2003	Bective	3-09	St Vincent's/Curraha	0-09	
2002	Moylagh		St Vincent's/Curraha		
2001	Boardsmill	4-12	Athboy/Bective	1-05	
2000	No Competition				
1999	No Competition				
1998	No Competition				

== MFC Division 5 Roll of Honour ==
Year	Winner	Score	Opponent	Score	Notes
2022	St. Michael's/ Nobber	4-15	Wolfe Tones	2-05	
2021	Ballivor	W/O	Ratoath 'B'	Scr.	
2020	Round Towers	4-11	Dunderry	3-10	
2019	Rathkenny	3-08	Moynalvey/Boardsmill	2-09	
2017	Dunderry	2-13	St Oliver's	0-12	
2016	St Cuthbert's	5-09	Duleek/Bellewstown	1-05	
2015	Moynalty	1-15	Kilbride	1-10	
2014	Nobber	3-13	Blackwater Gaels	3-11	
2013	Dunderry	3-14 (AET)	Nobber	1-19 (AET)	
2012	Ballinabrackey	2-10	Nobber	1-11	
2011	Na Fianna	2-10	Bective	1-10	
2010					
2009					
2008	Rathkenny	5-07 (AET)	Ballinabrackey	2-10 (AET)	Known as MFL Div 4
2007	Dunderry	0-12	Ballivor	2-05	Known as MFL Div 4
2006	No Competition				
2005	No Competition				
2004	No Competition				
2003	No Competition				

== MFC Division 6 Roll of Honour ==
Year	Winner	Score	Opponent	Score	Notes
2022	Moynalvey/Boardsmill	2-9	Clonard/Ballinabrackey	1-6	
2021	St. Peter's Dunboyne 'B'	4-9	Clann na nGael	1-8	

== U17 Football Special Championship ==
2017 was the final year of an under 18 age limit for minor grades. In 2017 the inaugural under 17 championship (which from 2018 onwards was known as Minor) was also held along with the Meath M.F.C.

- Division 1: Ratoath 1-17, 0-08 St Peter's Dunboyne,
- Division 2: St Vincent's/Curraha 3-13, 1-08 Simonstown Gaels,
- Division 3: Ballinabrackey 3-13, 1-04 Clann na nGael,
- Division 4: Dunderry 1-10, 0-11 Moynalty/Carnaross,
- Division 5: Oldcastle 1-11, 1-07 Duleek/Bellewstown,
- Division 6: Jenkinstown Gaels 0-08, 0-06 St Cuthbert's.
