= 2019 Meath Senior Football Championship =

Football league season

127th Meath Senior Football Championship
Tournament details
- County: Meath
- Province: Leinster
- Year: 2019
- Trophy: Keegan Cup
- Sponsor: Fairyhouse Steel
- Date: 4 April - 27 October
- Teams: 18
- Defending champions: St. Peter's Dunboyne

Winners
- Champions: Ratoath (1st Title)
- Manager: Davy Byrne
- Captain: Ciarán Ó Fearraigh
- Qualify for: Leinster Club SFC

Runners-up
- Runners-up: Summerhill
- Manager: Declan McCabe

Promotion/Relegation
- Promoted team(s): Nobber
- Relegated team(s): St. Patrick's; Rathkenny; Longwood

Other
- Matches played: 56
- Player of the Year: Joey Wallace
- Website: Meath GAA

The 2019 Meath Senior Football Championship was the 127th edition of the Meath GAA's premier club Gaelic football tournament for senior clubs in County Meath, Ireland. 18 teams competed, with the winner representing Meath in the Leinster Senior Club Football Championship. The championship started with a group stage and then progressed to a knock out stage.

St. Peter's Dunboyne were the defending champions after they defeated Summerhill in the 2018 final to claim their third S.F.C. crown. However, the defence of their title was disappointing, failing to proceed past the group stages.

This was Longwood's return to the top flight for the first time in 76 years after claiming the 2018 Meath Intermediate Football Championship. Longwood last won the I.F.C. in 1942 and after spending one season in the senior grade in 1943, they were regraded to the J.F.C. for 1944.

Longwood, Rathkenny and St. Patrick's were relegated back to the I.F.C. for 2020 after spending just one, 13 and 19 seasons respectively in the top-flight of Meath club football when losing a relegation play-off.

On 27 October 2019, Ratoath claimed their first ever S.F.C. title after just four years as a senior club when defeating Summerhill 3–15 to 2–13 in the final at Pairc Tailteann. Ciarán Ó Fearraigh became the first Ratoath captain to lift the Keegan Cup while Joey Wallace claimed the "Man-of-the-Match" award for his performance. The match was refereed by David Gough.

The draw for the group stages of the championship were made on 4 March 2019 with the games commencing on 4 April 2019.

== Structure change proposals ==
In 2019:

- 3 teams shall be relegated from the S.F.C. to the I.F.C. in 2019. The 2019 I.F.C. champions will be promoted to S.F.C. for 2020.
- Relegation from the S.F.C. shall be decided as follows - the teams that finish in fifth and sixth places in each Group A, B, and C each play one relegation game. The loser of each game will be relegated to the I.F.C. for 2020.
- The draw for the Relegation play-offs will be pre-determined as follows - A5 -vs- B6; B5 -vs- C6; C5 -vs- A6.
- In the event of a relegation game finishing level, extra-time will be played and if still level then the game will go to a replay.

In 2020:

- The S.F.C. shall contain 16 teams drawn in rotation into four groups each containing four teams. The top two teams shall progress to the quarter-finals, the bottom two in each group shall contest the relegation quarter-finals.

== Team changes ==
The following teams changed division since the 2018 championship season.

=== To S.F.C. ===
Promoted from I.F.C.

- Longwood - (Intermediate Champions)

=== From S.F.C. ===
Relegated to I.F.C.

- Blackhall Gaels

== Participating teams ==
The teams taking part in the 2019 Meath Senior Football Championship were:

Club	Location	Management	Pre C'ship Odds	2018 Championship Position	2019 Championship Position
Curraha	Curraha	Stephen Morgan	80/1	Relegation Play-Off	Preliminary Quarter Final
Donaghmore/Ashbourne	Ashbourne	Gabriel Brannigan	8/1	Semi-Finalist	Quarter-Finalist
Dunshaughlin	Dunshaughlin & Drumree	Anthony Moyles	50/1	Non Qualifier	Quarter-Finalist
Gaeil Colmcille	Kells	Lar Wall	11/1	Quarter-Finalist	Semi-Finalist
Longwood	Longwood	David Flynn	100/1	I.F.C. Champions	Relegated
Moynalvey	Moynalvey & Kiltale	Gerry Smith	25/1	Non Qualifier	Non Qualifier
Na Fianna	Enfield & Baconstown	Dudley Farrell	40/1	Non Qualifier	Quarter-Finalist
Navan O'Mahonys	Navan	Kevin Reilly	9/1	Non Qualifier	Non Qualifier
Rathkenny	Rathkenny & Stackallan	Dermot McCarthy	66/1	Non Qualifier	Relegated
Ratoath	Ratoath	David Byrne	11/2	Quarter-Finalist	Champions
Seneschalstown	Kentstown & Yellow Furze	Joe Cowley & Oisín McConville	40/1	Non Qualifier	Relegation Play-Off
Simonstown Gaels	Navan	Des Lane	5/1	Semi-Finalist	Semi Finalist
Skryne	Skryne & Tara	James Reddy	11/1	Quarter-Finalist	Quarter-Finalist
St. Patrick's	Gormanston, Julianstown & Stamullen	Davy Cahill	100/1	Relegation Play-Off	Relegated
St. Colmcille's	Bettystown, Donacarney, Laytown & Mornington	Gordon Ward	25/1	Quarter-Finalist	Relegation Play-Off
St. Peter's Dunboyne	Dunboyne	Ciaran Byrne	5/2	Champions	Non-Qualifier
Summerhill	Summerhill	Declan McCabe	4/1	Finalist	Finalist
Wolfe Tones	Kilberry, Gibbstown, Oristown & Wilkinstown	Tony Kearney	16/1	Preliminary Quarter-Finalist	Relegation Play-Off

== Group stage ==
There were three groups of six teams called Group A, B and C. The 1st and 2nd placed teams in Groups A, B and C along with the 3rd placed team in Group A automatically qualified for the quarter-finals. The third placed teams in Groups B and C engaged in the Preliminary Quarter-Final to determine the team that completed the quarter-finals lineup. The 5th and 6th placed teams proceeded to the Relegation Play-Off to determine which three teams would be relegated.

The draw for the group stages of the championship were made on 4 March 2019 with the games commencing on 4 April 2019.

Tiebreakers: If two or more teams were equal on points on completion of the group matches, the following tie-breaking criteria would be applied:

All Football Championships and Leagues shall be run on a combination of a league and knockout basis under Rule 6.21 T.O. Where teams finish equal with points for qualification or relegation process for concluding stages, the positioning shall be decided as follows;

- (i) Where three teams are involved - the outcome of the meetings of the three teams in their previous games in the competition. If three teams finish level on points for three places and one team has beaten the other two teams that team qualifies in first place and other places are determined by the specified order. If there are two positions and one team has beaten the other two teams that team qualifies and the second place is determined by the specified order. If there is one position and one team has beaten the other two team that team qualifies;
- (ii) Where two teams are involved - the outcome of the meeting of the two teams in the previous game in the competition;
- (iii) Scoring Difference;
- (iv) Highest total scores for;
- (v) A play-off.

=== Group A ===
Team	Pld	W	L	D	PF	PA	PD	Pts
Gaeil Colmcille	5	4	1	0	109	64	+45	8
Skryne	5	3	2	0	74	89	-15	6
Dunshaughlin	5	3	2	0	83	74	+9	6
Navan O'Mahonys	5	3	2	0	76	78	-2	6
Seneschalstown	5	2	3	0	100	97	+3	4
St Patrick's	5	0	5	0	56	94	-38	0

Skryne ranked ahead of Dunshaughlin and Navan O'Mahony's due to head-to-head results against the three sides.

Dunshaughlin are ranked ahead of Navan O'Mahony's as they won the head-to-head game between the two teams.

Round 1

- Gaeil Colmcille 1-11, 0-13 Dunshaughlin, Skryne, 4/4/2019,
- Skryne 0-12, 0-9 St. Patricks, Duleek, 6/4/2019,
- Navan O'Mahonys 2-11, 1-11 Seneschalstown, Walterstown, 6/4/2019,

Round 2

- Skryne 3-13, 2-13 Navan O'Mahonys, Simonstown, 20/4/2019,
- Gaeil Colmcille 2-14, 1-10 St. Patrick's, Rathkenny, 21/4/2019,
- Dunshaughlin 3-11, 2-13 Seneschalstown, Ashbourne, 21/4/2019,

Round 3

- Seneschalstown 2-15, 2-11 Skryne, Pairc Tailteann, 09/8/2019,
- Dunshaughlin 2-13, 0-11 St. Patrick's, Ashbourne, 10/8/2019,
- Navan O'Mahonys 1-11, 0-11 Gaeil Colmcille, Ballinlough, 14/8/2019,

Round 4

- Seneschalstown 5-14, 0-10 St. Patrick's, Donore, 23/8/2019,
- Gaeil Colmcille 3-18, 0-5 Skryne, Pairc Tailteann, 24/8/2019,
- Dunshaughlin 2-12, 1-9 Navan O'Mahonys, Ratoath, 24/8/2019

Round 5

- Gaeil Colmcille 8-9, 2-11 Seneschalstown, Drumconrath, 8/9/2019
- Navan O'Mahonys 1-11, 0-13 St. Patrick's, Donore, 8/9/2019
- Skryne 2-12, 2-7 Dunshaughlin, Trim, 8/9/2019

=== Group B ===
Team	Pld	W	L	D	PF	PA	PD	Pts
Summerhill	5	4	1	0	109	64	+45	8
Ratoath	5	4	1	0	97	54	+43	8
Donaghmore/Ashbourne	5	4	1	0	96	58	+38	8
Moynalvey	5	2	3	0	74	60	+14	4
Rathkenny	5	1	4	0	60	110	-50	2
Longwood	5	0	5	0	60	150	-90	0

Head-to-head results could not separate Summerhill, Ratoath and Donaghmore/Ashbourne, so each team's score difference came into effect.

Round 1

- Moynalvey 3-12, 0-9 Rathkenny, Skryne, 6/4/2019,
- Ratoath 7-16, Longwood 0–11, Trim, 7/4/2019,
- Donaghmore/Ashbourne 1-15, 1-10 Summerhill, Dunshaughlin, 7/4/2019,

Round 2

- Rathkenny 1-14, 2-9 Longwood, Pairc Tailteann, 20/4/2019,
- Ratoath 0-11, 0-8 Donaghmore/Ashbourne, Pairc Tailteann, 20/4/2019,
- Summerhill 1-14, 1-9 Moynalvey, Trim, 20/4/2019,

Round 3

- Donaghmore/Ashbourne 3-15, 0-11 Rathkenny, Duleek, 9/8/2019,
- Summerhill 1-10, 1-9 Ratoath, Pairc Tailteann, 11/8/2019,
- Moynalvey 2-16, 1-6 Longwood, Summerhill, 13/8/2019,

Round 4

- Summerhill 4-19, 1-11 Rathkenny, Pairc Tailteann, 24/8/2019,
- Ratoath 2-12, 1-10 Moynalvey, Skryne, 25/8/2019,
- Donaghmore/Ashbourne 6-21, 2-11 Longwood, Walterstown, 25/8/2019,

Round 5

- Donaghmore/Ashbourne 0-7, 0-6 Moynalvey, Skryne, 7/9/2019
- Ratoath 1-16, 0-9 Rathkenny, Seneschalstown, 7/9/2019
- Summerhill 4-23, 0-8 Longwood, Clonard, 7/9/2019

=== Group C ===
Team	Pld	W	L	D	PF	PA	PD	Pts
Simonstown Gaels	5	4	1	0	83	60	+23	8
Na Fianna	5	3	2	0	84	97	-13	6
Curraha	5	3	2	0	95	71	+25	6
St. Peter's Dunboyne	5	2	2	1	73	73	+0	5
Wolfe Tones	5	2	3	0	70	81	-11	4
St. Colmcille's	5	0	4	1	72	75	-23	1

Na Fianna are ranked above Curraha due to the head-to-head result between the two teams.

Round 1

- St. Peter's Dunboyne 1-16, 0-14 Curraha, Ratoath, 6/4/2019,
- Na Fianna 3-9, 0-14 St. Colmcille's, Trim, 7/4/2019,
- Simonstown Gaels 2-8, 1-9 Wolfe Tones, Brews Hill, 12/4/2019,

Round 2

- Wolfe Tones 0-13, 0-11 St. Peter's Dunboyne, Skryne, 18/4/2019,
- Simonstown Gaels 0-14, 0-13 St. Colmcille's, Ashbourne, 18/4/2019,
- Na Fianna 2-15, 3-11 Curraha, Dunsany, 20/4/2019,

Round 3

- Wolfe Tones 2-15, 1-13 St. Colmcille's, Stamullen, 11/8/2019,
- Curraha 0-12, 0-7 Simonstown Gaels, Skryne, 11/8/2019,
- St. Peter's Dunboyne 2-12, 1-11 Na Fianna, Pairc Tailteann, 11/8/2019,

Round 4

- Simonstown Gaels 3-22, 1-10 Na Fianna, Trim, 25/8/2019,
- Curraha 1-19, 1-7 Wolfe Tones, Pairc Tailteann, 25/8/2019,
- St. Peter's Dunboyne 0–15, 1-12 St. Colmcille's, Stamullen, 25/8/2019,

Round 5

- Simonstown 1-14, 0-10 St. Peter's Dunboyne, Dunshaughlin, 8/9/2019
- Curraha 2-21, 1-11 St. Colmcille's, Stamullen, 8/9/2019
- Na Fianna 0-18, 0-14 Wolfe Tones, Páirc Tailteann, 8/9/2019

== Knock-out stage ==
Preliminary round
Donaghmore/Ashbourne	1-12
Curraha	0-9

Quarter-Finals
Gaeil Colmcille	1-12
Donaghmore/Ashbourne	0-10
Skryne	1-6
Ratoath	4-16
Summerhill	3-19
Na Fianna	1-11
Simonstown Gaels	3-11
Dunshaughlin	0-11

Semi-Finals
Gaeil Colmcille	1-10
Ratoath	2-14
Summerhill	2-12
Simonstown Gaels	2-10

Final
Ratoath	3-15
Summerhill	2-13

=== Preliminary Quarter-Final ===
22 September 2019 Preliminary Quarter-Final	Donaghmore/Ashbourne	1-12 – 0-09	Curraha	Skryne
17:00 IST (UTC+1)
		Report

=== Quarter-finals ===
27 September 2019 Quarter-Final 4	Simonstown Gaels	3-11 – 0-11	Dunshaughlin	Ashbourne
20:00 IST (UTC+1)
		Report

28 September 2019 Quarter-Final 1	Gaeil Colmcille	1-12 – 0-10	Donaghmore/Ashbourne	Navan
15:45 IST (UTC+1)				Venue: Pairc Tailteann
		Report

28 September 2019 Quarter-Final 3	Summerhill	3-19 – 1-11	Na Fianna	Navan
17:15 IST (UTC+1)				Venue: Pairc Tailteann
		Report

29 September 2019 Quarter-Final 2	Ratoath	4-16 – 1-6	Skryne	Navan
15:45 IST (UTC+1)				Venue: Pairc Tailteann
		Report

=== Semi-finals ===
13 October 2019 Semi-Final 1	Ratoath	2-14 – 1-10	Gaeil Colmcille	Navan
16:00 IST (UTC+1)				Venue: Pairc Tailteann
		Report		Referee: Cormac Reilly

12 October 2019 Semi-Final 2	Summerhill	2-12 – 2-10	Simonstown Gaels	Navan
16:30 IST (UTC+1)				Venue: Pairc Tailteann
		Report		Referee: David Coldrick

=== Final ===
27 October 2019 Final	Ratoath	3-15 – 2-13	Summerhill	Navan
15:00 IST (UTC+1)				Venue: Pairc Tailteann
		Report		Referee: David Gough

== Relegation play-off ==
Due to the 2019 modifications of the club football structure in Meath ratified by the County Board in early January 2019, for the 2019 season three clubs were due to be relegated to the 2020 Meath I.F.C. in order to leave 16 clubs competing for the 2020 Meath S.F.C.

The Relegation Play-Off consisted of the 5th and 6th-placed finishers in Groups A, B and C. The three winners retained their senior status while the three losers were relegated to the Intermediate championship.

20 September 2019 Relegation Play-Off	Wolfe Tones	1-18 – 2-2	St. Patrick's	Donore
19:45 IST (UTC+1)

22 September 2019 Relegation Play-Off	St. Colmcille's	0-15 – 0-10	Rathkenny	Seneschalstown
17:00 IST (UTC+1)

6 October 2019 Relegation Play-Off	Seneschalstown	1-11 – 0-11	Longwood	Clonard
12:00 IST (UTC+1)
		Report

== Leinster Senior Club Football Championship ==
Quarter Final: Garrycastle 3-11 Ratoath 2-12, Cusack Park, 10/11/2019
