= 2018 Meath Senior Football Championship =

Meath S.F.C.
- Season: 2018
- Champions: St. Peter's Dunboyne
- Relegated: Blackhall Gaels
- Leinster SCFC: (quarter-final); St. Peter's Dunboyne 0-7 Kilmacud Crokes 2-17
- Winning Captain: Cathal Finn
- Man of the Match: Cathal Finn
- Winning Manager: Ciaran Byrne
- Matches: 55

The 2018 Meath Senior Football Championship was the 126th edition of the Meath GAA's premier club Gaelic football tournament for senior clubs in County Meath, Ireland. Eighteen teams competed, with the winner representing Meath in the Leinster Senior Club Football Championship. The championship started with a group stage and then progressed to a knock out stage.

Simonstown Gaels were the defending champions after they defeated Summerhill in the 2017 final to claim a "2-in-a-row" of titles.

This was Curraha's debut in the top flight after claiming the 2017 Meath Intermediate Football Championship. Their 35 point loss (5-27 to 0-7) to Summerhill was the largest losing margin of any team in a S.F.C. match since 1996, when St. Colmcille's lost by a 44 point margin to Kilmainhamwood.

The draw for the group stages of the championship were made on 5 March 2018 with the games commencing on the weekend of 15 April 2018.

Blackhall Gaels were relegated to the Intermediate championship for 2019 after 17 years in the top-flight, including a S.F.C. title in 2003.

== Team changes ==
The following teams changed division since the 2017 championship season.

=== To S.F.C. ===
Promoted from I.F.C.

- Curraha - (Intermediate Champions)

=== From S.F.C. ===
Relegated to I.F.C.

- Duleek/Bellewstown

== Participating teams ==
The teams taking part in the 2018 Meath Senior Football Championship are:

Club	Location	Management	Pre C'ship Odds	2017 Championship Position	2018 Championship Position
Blackhall Gaels	Batterstown & Kilcloon	Liam Keane	80/1	Relegation Playoff	Relegated to IFC
Curraha	Curraha	Stephen Morgan	50/1	Intermediate Champions	Relegation Playoff
Donaghmore/Ashbourne	Ashbourne	Gabriel Brannigan	13/2	Non Qualifier	Semi-finalist
Dunshaughlin	Dunshaughlin & Drumree	Anthony Moyles	50/1	Non Qualifier	Non Qualifier
Gaeil Colmcille	Kells	Lar Wall	16/1	Semi-finalist	Quarter-finalist
Moynalvey	Moynalvey & Kiltale	Darren Fay	12/1	Quarter-Finalist	Non Qualifier
Na Fianna	Enfield & Baconstown	Seán O'Dea	33/1	Preliminary Quarter-Finalist	Non Qualifier
Navan O'Mahonys	Navan	Kevin Reilly	13/2	Quarter-Finalist	Non Qualifier
Rathkenny	Rathkenny & Stackallan	Diarmuid McCarthy	66/1	Non Qualifier	Non Qualifier
Ratoath	Ratoath	Fergal Power	5/1	Quarter-Finalist	Quarter-finalist
Seneschalstown	Kentstown & Yellow Furze	Damien Sheridan	28/1	Non Qualifier	Non Qualifier
Simonstown Gaels	Navan	Ciaran Kenny	9/2	champions	Semi-finalist
Skryne	Skryne & Tara	James Reddy	10/1	Relegation Playoff	Quarter-finalist
St. Patrick's	Gormanston, Julianstown & Stamullen	Niall Russell	66/1	Non Qualifier	Relegation Playoff
St. Colmcille's	Bettystown, Donacarney, Laytown & Mornington	Des Lane	50/1	Non Qualifier	Quarter-finalist
St. Peter's Dunboyne	Dunboyne	Ciaran Byrne	4/1	Quarter-finalist	champions
Summerhill	Summerhill	John Lyons	11/2	Finalist	Finalist
Wolfe Tones	Kilberry, Gibbstown, Oristown & Wilkinstown	Tony Kearney	11/1	Semi-finalist	Preliminary Quarter-Finalist

== Group stage ==
There were three groups of six teams called Group A, B and C. The 2 top finishers in each group and the third-place finisher in Group A qualified for the quarter-finals. The third placed teams in Group B and C will qualified for a Preliminary Quarter-final, with the winner earning a place in last eight. The bottom finishers of each group qualified for the Relegation Play-off. The draw for the group stages of the championship were made on 6 March 2017 with the games commencing on the weekend of 20 May 2017.

=== Group A ===
Team	Pld	W	L	D	PF	PA	PD	Pts
St. Peter's Dunboyne	5	4	0	1	80	58	+22	9
Simonstown Gaels	5	3	1	1	89	63	+26	7
Donaghmore/Ashbourne	5	3	1	1	79	65	+14	7
Seneschalstown	5	2	3	0	78	78	+0	4
Dunshaughlin	5	1	3	1	71	79	-8	3
Blackhall Gaels	5	0	5	0	50	104	-54	0

Round 1

- Donaghmore/Ashbourne 1-12, 1-11 Seneschalstown, Stamullen, 7/4/2018,
- St. Peter's Dunboyne 2-11, 0-11 Blackhall Gaels, Ashbourne, 8/4/2018,
- Simonstown Gaels 4-10, 0-12 Dunshaughlin, Pairc Tailteann, 8/4/2018,

Round 2

- Donaghmore/Ashbourne 1-16, 0-11 Blackhall Gaels, Simonstown, 20/4/2018,
- St. Peter's Dunboyne 1-12, 0-6 Simonstown Gaels, Trim, 21/4/2018,
- Seneschalstown 2-7, 1-8 Dunshaughlin, Ashbourne, 22/4/2018,

Round 3

- Simonstown Gaels 3-15, 2-6 Seneschalstown, Pairc Tailteann, 27/7/2018,
- St. Peter's Dunboyne 0-13, 1-9 Donaghmore/Ashbourne, Dunsany, 28/7/2018,
- Dunshaughlin 4-10, 1-9 Blackhall Gaels, Pairc Tailteann, 29/7/2018,

Round 4

- Donaghmore/Ashbourne 1-15, 1-9 Dunshaughlin, Ratoath, 11/8/2018,
- Simonstown Gaels 2-16, 0-9 Blackhall Gaels, Trim, 12/8/2018,
- St. Peter's Dunboyne 0-21, 1-12 Seneschalstown, Ashbourne, 12/8/2018,

Round 5

- St. Peter's Dunboyne 0-14, 1-11 Dunshaughlin, Ardcath, 24/8/2018,
- Seneschalstown 4-12, 0-7 Blackhall Gaels, Dunshaughlin, 24/8/2018,
- Simonstown Gaels 1-12, 1-12 Donaghmore/Ashbourne, Skryne, 24/8/2018,

=== Group B ===
Team	Pld	W	L	D	PF	PA	PD	Pts
Summerhill	5	4	1	0	120	64	+56	8
Skryne	5	4	1	0	96	73	+23	8
Gaeil Colmcille	5	3	2	0	104	61	+43	6
Na Fianna	5	2	3	0	68	102	-34	4
Navan O'Mahonys	5	1	3	1	72	89	-17	3
Curraha	5	0	4	1	51	122	-71	1

Round 1

- Skryne 1-14, 0-10 Curraha, Pairc Tailteann, 7/4/2018,
- Navan O'Mahonys 4-14, 1-7 Na Fianna, Trim, 8/4/2018,
- Gaeil Colmcille 2-14, 0-12 Summerhill, Trim, 8/4/2018,

Round 2

- Na Fianna 0-17, 0-15 Gaeil Colmcille, Pairc Tailteann, 21/4/2018,
- Summerhill 3-11, 1-12 Skryne, Bohermeen, 22/4/2018,
- Navan O'Mahonys 0-14, 1-11 Curraha, Dunsany, 22/4/2018,

Round 3

- Summerhill 5-27, 0-7 Curraha, Pairc Tailteann, 28/7/2018,
- Skryne 1-21, 1-11 Na Fianna, Bohermeen, 29/7/2018,
- Gaeil Colmcille 4-8, 0-8 Navan O'Mahonys, Kilmainhamwood, 29/7/2018,

Round 4

- Na Fianna 0-15, 1-9 Curraha, Simonstown, 10/8/2018,
- Skryne 1-13, 0-15 Gaeil Colmcille, Pairc Tailteann, 12/8/2018,
- Summerhill 4-9, 0-10 Navan O'Mahonys, Pairc Tailteann, 14/8/2018,

Round 5

- Skryne 1-21, 1-11 Navan O'Mahonys, Pairc Tailteann, 25/8/2018,
- Summerhill 3-16, 1-9 Na Fianna, Clonard, 25/8/2018,
- Gaeil Colmcille 4-22, 0-8 Curraha, Walterstown, 25/8/2018,

=== Group C ===
Team	Pld	W	L	D	PF	PA	PD	Pts
Ratoath	5	4	0	1	96	64	+32	9
St. Colmcille's	5	3	2	0	69	73	-4	6
Wolfe Tones	5	3	2	0	75	58	+17	6
Moynalvey	5	2	2	1	70	79	-9	5
Rathkenny	5	1	3	1	50	64	-14	3
St Patrick's	5	0	4	1	55	78	-23	1

Round 1

- Ratoath 3-12, 4-9 St. Patrick's, Ashbourne, 6/4/2018,
- St. Colmcille's 1-17, 0-12 Rathkenny, Stamullen, 7/4/2018,
- Wolfe Tones 3-16, 0-10 Moynalvey, Skryne, 8/4/2018,

Round 2

- Rathkenny 0-10, 0-8 St. Patrick's, Duleek, 20/4/2018,
- Ratoath 1-18, 1-5 Moynalvey, Skryne, 20/4/2018,
- St. Colmcille's 0-11, 0-10 Wolfe Tones, Pairc Tailteann, 22/4/2018,

Round 3

- Ratoath 1-12, 0-10 Rathkenny, Bohermeen, 27/7/2018,
- Wolfe Tones 1-10, 0-5 St. Patrick's, Skryne, 28/7/2018,
- Moynalvey 3-14, 0-14 St. Colmcille's, Dunshaughlin, 29/7/2018,

Round 4

- Ratoath 4-13, 2-11 Wolfe Tones, Pairc Tailteann, 10/8/2018,
- St. Colmcille's 1-14, 0-13 St. Patrick's, Duleek, 11/8/2018,
- Moynalvey 1-8, 0-11 Rathkenny, Pairc Tailteann, 11/8/2018,

Round 5

- Wolfe Tones 0-10, 0-7 Rathkenny, Castletown, 24/8/2018,
- Ratoath 1-11, 1-5 St. Colmcille's, Duleek, 24/8/2018,
- Moynalvey 2-11, 0-8 St. Patrick's, Ashbourne, 24/8/2018,

== Knock-out stage ==
The winners and runners up of the three groups and the third placed team of Group A automatically qualified for the quarter-finals. The third placed teams in Groups B and C met in a play off to determine the team that completed the quarter-final lineup.

Preliminary round
Gaeil Colmcille	3-13
Wolfe Tones	1-13

Quarter-Finals
St. Peter's Dunboyne	2-14 (a.e.t.)
Gaeil Colmcille	0-16 (a.e.t.)
Simonstown Gaels	2-20
Skryne	1-15
Summerhill	2-19
St. Colmcille's	3-10
Ratoath	1-8
Donaghmore/Ashbourne	1-9

Semi-Finals
St. Peter's Dunboyne	2-16
Simonstown Gaels	0-8
Summerhill	3-12
Donaghmore/Ashbourne	2-6

Final
St. Peter's Dunboyne	1-11
Summerhill	0-09

=== Preliminary Quarter-Final ===
3 September 2018; 8:00pm	Gaeil Colmcille	3-13 - 1-13	Wolfe Tones	Castletown; Referee: Cormac Reilly (St.Mary's)
3 September 2018; 8:00pm	Brian Hanlon 1-4, Fionn Reilly 2-0, Seamus Mattimoe 0-6, Oisin Reilly 0-2, Martin Barrett 0-1	Report	Cian Ward 1-3, Thomas O'Reilly 0-5, Saran O'Fionnagain 0-2, Niall O'Reilly, Alan Callaghan, Daniel O'NEill 0-1 each.	Castletown; Referee: Cormac Reilly (St.Mary's)

=== Quarter-finals ===
7 September 2018; 8:00pm	Summerhill	2-19 - 3-10	St. Colmcille's	Skryne; Referee: Cormac Reilly (St. Mary's Donore)
7 September 2018; 8:00pm	Barry Dardis 0-7, David Larkin 1-5, Willie Ryan 1-0, Sean Dalton, Padraig Geraghty 0-2 each, Kevin Ryan, Diarmuid McCabbe, Paul Larkin 0-1 each.	Report	Graham Reilly 2-2, James Conlon 0-6, Conor O'Byrne 1-0, Ben Brennan, David O'Byrne 0-1 each.	Skryne; Referee: Cormac Reilly (St. Mary's Donore)

8 September 2018; 4:30pm	Donaghmore/Ashbourne	1-9 - 1-8	Ratoath	Páirc Tailteann; Referee: David Coldrick (Blackhall Gaels)
8 September 2018; 4:30pm	Andrew Tormey 1-3, Paul Gilligan 0-3, Colm O'Mealoid, James Crumish, Darragh McGovern 0-1 each	Report	Bryan McMahon 0-7, Joey Wallace 1-0, Darragh Kelly 0-1.	Páirc Tailteann; Referee: David Coldrick (Blackhall Gaels)

9 September 2018; 4:00pm	Simonstown Gaels	2-20 - 1-15	Skryne	Páirc Tailteann; Referee: Colm McManus (Gaeil Colmcille)
9 September 2018; 4:00pm	Padgraig McKeever 0-6, Andrew Kearney 0-4, Ben Hoey 1-1, Niall Kane 1-0, Nicky O'Brien, Shane Barry 0-2 each, Mark Gardiner, James Kilcullen, Sean Tobin, Conor Sheridan, Joe Lyons 0-1 each	Report	Patrick O'Rourke 0-13, Ian Davis 1-0, Eoin Smyth, Darragh Campion 0-1 each.	Páirc Tailteann; Referee: Colm McManus (Gaeil Colmcille)

9 September 2018; 6:30pm	St. Peter's Dunboyne	2-14 - 0-16 (a.e.t.)	Gaeil Colmcille	Dunshaughlin; Referee: David Gough (Slane)
9 September 2018; 6:30pm	Donal Lenhian 1-5, Robert McCarthy 0-4, Sean Ryan 1-0, Liam Bryne 0-2, Ronan Jones, Cathal Lacey, Shane Comiskey 0-1 each	Report	Brian Hanlon 0-13, Seamus Mattimoe 0-2, Fionn Ferguson 0-1.	Dunshaughlin; Referee: David Gough (Slane)

=== Semi-finals ===
29 September 2018; 3:00pm	St. Peter's Dunboyne	2-16 - 0-8	Simonstown Gaels	Pairc Tailteann; Referee: Cormac Reilly (St. Mary's)
29 September 2018; 3:00pm	Donal Lenihan 0-7, Robert McCarthy 1-4, Stuart Lowndes 1-1, Shane McEntee, Niall Jones, David McEntee, Conor Doran 0-1 each.	Report	Padraig McKeever 0-5, James Kilcullen, Nathan O'Brien, Michael Brennan 0-1 each.	Pairc Tailteann; Referee: Cormac Reilly (St. Mary's)

30 September 2018; 1:45pm	Summerhill	3-12 - 2-7	Donaghmore/Ashbourne	Pairc Tailteann; Referee: David Coldrick (Blackhall Gaels)
30 September 2018; 1:45pm	Barry Dardis 2-6, David Dalton 1-1, Sean Dalton 0-3, Kevin Ryan 0-2	Report	Paul Gilligan 0-3, Andrew Tormey 1-0, Gary Sweeney 1-0, Shane Melia, Bryan Menton, Dylan Reilly, Stephen Carton 0-1 each	Pairc Tailteann; Referee: David Coldrick (Blackhall Gaels)

=== Final ===
14/10/2018; 15:30	St. Peter's Dunboyne	1-11 - 0-09	Summerhill	Pairc Tailteann; Referee: Colm McManus
14/10/2018; 15:30	Robert McCarthy 0-7 (0-5f), Stuart Lowndes 1-0, Donal Lenihan 0-1 (1f), Liam Byrne, David McEntee, Cathal Lacey 0-1 each.	Report	Barry Dardis 0-4 (0-4f), David Larkin 0-2, Michael Byrne, Sean Dalton, Padraig Geraghty 0-1 each	Pairc Tailteann; Referee: Colm McManus

== Relegation play-off group ==
The three bottom teams from each group entered the relegation play-off group and play each other in a round robin basis.

The team with the worst record after two matches was relegated to the 2019 Intermediate Championship.

Team	Pld	W	L	D	PF	PA	PD	Pts
St. Patrick's	1	1	0	0	15	10	+5	2
Curraha	1	1	0	0	15	12	+3	2
Blackhall Gaels	2	0	2	0	22	30	-8	0

- Game 1: Curraha 0-15, 1-9 Blackhall Gaels, Dunshaughlin, 6/9/2018,
- Game 2: St. Patrick's 1-12, 0-10 Blackhall Gaels, Ashbourne, 13/9/2018,

== Leinster Senior Club Football Championship ==
Round 1:

- Shelmaliers 1-2, 1-12 St Peters Dunboyne, Wexford Park, 28/10/2018,

Quarter-final:

- St. Peters Dunboyne 0-7, 2-17 Kilmacud Crokes, Pairc Tailteann, 11/11/2018,
