= 2018 Meath Intermediate Football Championship =

Meath I.F.C.
- Season: 2018
- Promoted: Longwood (2nd Title)
- Relegated: St. Ultan's
- Leinster ICFC: Two Mile House, Kildare
- All Ireland ICFC: Kilcummin, Kerry

The 2018 Meath Intermediate Football Championship is the 92nd edition of the Meath GAA's premier club Gaelic football tournament for Intermediate graded teams in County Meath, Ireland. The tournament consists of 18 teams, with the winner going on to represent Meath in the Leinster Intermediate Club Football Championship. The championship starts with a group stage and then progresses to a knock out stage.

The draw for the group stages of the championship were made on 5 March 2018 with the games commencing on the weekend of 15 April 2018.

Meath Hill were promoted to the middle grade after a 24-year exodus when securing the J.F.C. crown in 2017.

This was Duleek/Bellewstown's first ever period as an Intermediate club after spending 10 years as a senior club since being established from the Duleek and Bellewstown clubs in 2008.

Longwood beat Ballinlough by 0-11 to 0-7 in the 2018 final to win their first Meath Intermediate Football title since 1942. St. Ultan's were relegated to the 2019 Meath Junior Football Championship. They played at the junior grade for the first time since 2006.

== Team changes ==
The following teams have changed division since the 2017 championship season.

=== From I.F.C. ===
Promoted to 2018 S.F.C.

- Curraha - (Intermediate Champions)

Relegated to 2018 J.F.C.

- Ballivor

=== To I.F.C. ===
Relegated from 2017 S.F.C.

- Duleek/Bellewstown

Promoted from 2017 J.F.C.

- Meath Hill - (Junior 'A' Champions)

== Participating teams ==
The teams taking part in the 2018 Meath Intermediate Football Championship are:

Club	Location	Management	2017 Championship Position	2018 Championship Position
Ballinabrackey	Ballinabrackey	Darren Bannon	Preliminary Quarter-Finalist	Semi Finalist
Ballinlough	Ballinlough & Kilskyre	Brian Donohoe	Quarter-Finalist	runners-up
Bective	Navan	Davy Hosie	Non Qualifier	Non Qualifier
Castletown	Castletown	Paul Smith	Non Qualifier	Relegation Playoff
Donaghmore/Ashbourne 'B'	Ashbourne	Vincent Carton	Quarter-Finalist	Non Qualifier
Drumbaragh Emmets	Drumbaragh, Kells	Conor Brennan	Non Qualifier	Non Qualifier
Duleek/Bellewstown	Duleek & Bellewstown	Anthony Malone	Relegated from SFC	Preliminary Quarter Finalist
Dunderry	Dunderry	Kevin Dowd	Non Qualifier	Quarter Finalist
Kilmainham	Kilmainham, Kells	Gary Farrelly	Quarter-Finalist	Relegation Playoff
Longwood	Longwood	David Flynn	Relegation Play-off	champions
Meath Hill	Meath Hill	Davy Cahill	Junior Champions	Non Qualifier
Nobber	Nobber	John Tiernan	Semi Finalist	Non Qualifier
Oldcastle	Oldcastle	Leo McEnroe	Semi Finalist	Semi Finalist
St. Michael's	Carlanstown & Kilbeg	Ciaran Conlon	Finalists	Quarter Finalist
St. Ultan's	Bohermeen	Padraig Coyle	Relegation Play-off	Relegated
Syddan	Lobinstown	Myles Byrne	Non Qualifier	Quarter Finalist
Trim	St Lomans Park, Trim	Brendan Murphy	Quarter-Finalist	Quarter Finalist
Walterstown	Johnstown, Navan	Eoin Carroll	Non Qualifier	Non Qualifier

== Group stage ==
There are 3 groups called Group A, B and C. The 2 top finishers in each group and the third-place finisher in Group A will qualify for the quarter finals. The third placed teams in Group B and C will qualify for a Preliminary Quarter Final, with the winner earning a place in last eight. The bottom finishers of each group will qualify for the Relegation Play-off.

The draw for the group stages of the championship were made on 5 March 2018 with the games commencing on the weekend of 15 April 2018.

=== Group A ===
Team	Pld	W	L	D	PF	PA	PD	Pts
Ballinabrackey	5	5	0	0	85	66	+19	8
Trim	5	3	2	0	79	60	+19	6
St. Michael's	5	2	2	1	83	78	+5	5
Nobber	5	2	2	1	75	72	+3	5
Walterstown	5	2	3	0	72	86	-14	4
St. Ultan's	5	1	4	0	71	103	-32	2

Round 1

- Ballinabrackey 0-9, 0-5 Trim, Clonard, 8/4/2018,
- St. Michael's 0-9, 0-9 Nobber, Drumconrath, 8/4/2018,
- St. Ultan's 1-12, 0-14 Walterstown, Dunganny, 11/4/2018,

Round 2

- Trim 2-15, 0-9 Walterstown, Dunshaughlin, 20/4/2018,
- Ballinabrackey 3-13, 3-10 St. Michael's, Pairc Tailteann, 21/4/2018,
- Nobber 3-14, 2-10 St. Ultan's, Kilmainham, 21/4/2018,

Round 3

- St. Michael's 1-14, 0-14 Walterstown, Castletown, 27/7/2018,
- Ballinabrackey 2-12, 0-11 Nobber, Athboy, 28/7/2018,
- Trim 2-17, 2-5 St. Ultan's, Pairc Tailteann, 28/7/2018,

Round 4

- Walterstown 1-15, 1-13 Nobber, Castletown, 10/8/2018,
- Trim 1-15, 1-12 St. Michael's, Athboy, 11/8/2018,
- Ballinabrackey 2-14, 2-8 St. Ultan's, Kildalkey, 12/8/2018,

Round 5

- St. Michael's 1-20, 2-9 St. Ultan's, Ballinlough, 23/8/2018,
- Walterstown 3-8, 2-10 Ballinabrackey, Longwood, 23/8/2018,
- Nobber 3-7, 1-8 Trim, Brew's Hill, 23/8/2018,

=== Group B ===
Team	Pld	W	L	D	PF	PA	PD	Pts
Syddan	5	4	1	0	80	68	+12	8
Longwood	5	3	1	1	98	79	+19	7
Dunderry	5	3	2	0	85	67	+18	6
Meath Hill	5	2	2	1	70	80	-10	5
Drumbaragh Emmets	5	0	3	2	69	86	-17	2
Kilmainham	5	0	3	2	66	88	-22	2

Round 1

- Syddan 2-10, 2-5 Drumbaragh, Simonstown, 7/4/2018,
- Longwood 3-12, 1-13 Dunderry, Pairc Tailteann, 8/4/2018,
- Meath Hill 1-17, 3-11 Kilmainham, Carlanstown, 14/4/2018,

Round 2

- Longwood 2-13, 2-11 Kilmainham, Brews Hill, 20/4/2018,
- Dunderry 2-14, 1-9 Drumbaragh, Athboy, 21/4/2018,
- Meath Hill 0-14, 0-8 Syddan, Drumconrath, 21/4/2018,

Round 3

- Dunderry 1-16, 0-6 Kilmainham, Trim, 29/7/2018,
- Syddan 4-9, 2-12 Longwood, Trim, 29/7/2018,
- Meath Hill 1-16, 2-9 Drumbaragh, Pairc Tailteann, 29/7/2018,

Round 4

- Drumbaragh 1-10, 2-7 Kilmainham, Kells, 10/8/2018,
- Syddan 0-18, 2-9 Dunderry, Bohermeen, 11/8/2018,
- Longwood 1-19, 0-7 Meath Hill, Bective, 12/8/2018,

Round 5

- Drumbaragh 1-15, 1-15 Longwood, Dunganny, 24/8/2018,
- Syddan 0-17, 0-10 Kilmainham, Moynalty, 24/8/2018,
- Dunderry 1-12, 0-10 Meath Hill, Cortown, 24/8/2018,

=== Group C ===
Team	Pld	W	L	D	PF	PA	PD	Pts
Ballinlough	5	4	1	0	81	71	+10	8
Oldcastle	5	3	2	0	87	61	+26	6
Duleek/Bellewstown	5	3	2	0	79	65	+14	6
Bective	5	3	2	0	72	69	+3	6
Donaghmore/Ashbourne 'B'	5	2	3	0	67	92	-25	4
Castletown	5	0	5	0	65	97	-32	0

Round 1

- Bective 1-10, 1-7 Oldcastle, Pairc Tailteann, 7/4/2018,
- Duleek/Bellewstown 1-10, 1-5 Castletown, Syddan, 8/4/2018,
- Donaghmore/Ashbourne 'B' 1-9, 0-11 Ballinlough, Martry, 8/4/2018,

Round 2

- Ballinlough 2-9, 1-11 Bective, Carlanstown, 20/4/2018,
- Donaghmore/Ashbourne 'B' 4-10, 1-12 Castletown, Seneschalstown, 21/4/2018,
- Oldcastle 1-15, 1-9 Duleek/Bellewstown, Kilberry, 21/4/2018,

Round 3

- Ballinlough 2-10, 1-11 Oldcastle, Moylagh, 29/7/2018,
- Bective 2-13, 1-12 Castletown, Waltesrtown, 29/7/2018,
- Duleek/Bellewstown 1-21, 0-10 Donaghmore/Ashbourne 'B', Donore, 29/7/2018,

Round 4

- Ballinlough 0-13, 0-12 Duleek/Bellewstown, Skryne, 10/8/2018,
- Bective 1-11, 1-8 Donaghmore/Ashbourne 'B', Ratoath, 11/8/2018,
- Oldcastle 2-11, 0-8 Castletown, Kilmainham, 12/8/2018,

Round 5

- Duleek/Bellewstown 2-12, 0-12 Bective, Seneschalstown, 25/8/2018,
- Ballinlough 6-8, 2-13 Castletown, Carlanstown, 25/8/2018,
- Oldcastle 5-13, 1-9 Donaghmore/Ashbourne 'B', Bohermeen, 25/8/2018,

== Knock-Out Stage ==
The winners and runners up of the three groups and the third placed team of Group A automatically qualify for the quarter finals. The third placed teams in Groups B and C play off to determine the team that completes the quarter final lineup.

Preliminary round
Dunderry	1-14
Duleek/Bellewstown	0-14

Quarter-Finals
Ballinabrackey	0-7
Dunderry	0-4
Trim	2-15 (a.e.t.)
Longwood	4-17 (a.e.t.)
Syddan	0-11
Oldcastle	3-11
Ballinlough	1-13
St. Michael's	0-13

Semi-Finals
Ballinabrackey	0-12
Longwood	1-10
Oldcastle	1-9
Ballinlough	1-10

Final
Longwood	0-11
Ballinlough	0-7

=== Preliminary Quarter-Final ===
1 September 2018; 7:00pm	Dunderry	1-14 - 0-14	Duleek/Bellewstown	Dunshaughlin; Referee: ???
1 September 2018; 7:00pm		Report		Dunshaughlin; Referee: ???

=== Quarter-finals ===
8 September 2018; 4:30pm	Longwood	4-17 - 2-15 (a.e.t.)	Trim	Summerhill; Referee: Richard Morris (Blackhall Gaels)
8 September 2018; 4:30pm		Report		Summerhill; Referee: Richard Morris (Blackhall Gaels)

8 September 2018; 7:00pm	Ballinlough	1-13 - 0-13	St. Michael's	Carnaross; Referee: Bernard Heaney (Clann na nGael)
8 September 2018; 7:00pm		Report		Carnaross; Referee: Bernard Heaney (Clann na nGael)

9 September 2018; 2:30pm	Oldcastle	3-11 - 0-11	Syddan	Páirc Tailteann; Referee: Gerry McGivney (Simonstown Gaels)
9 September 2018; 2:30pm		Report		Páirc Tailteann; Referee: Gerry McGivney (Simonstown Gaels)

9 September 2018; 6:30pm	Ballinabrackey	0-7 - 0-4	Dunderry	Simonstown; Referee: Martin Griffin (Simonstown Gaels)

=== Semi-finals ===
15 September 2018; 5:00pm	Ballinlough	1-10 - 1-9	Oldcastle	Pairc Tailteann; Referee: Martin Griffin (Simonstown Gaels)
15 September 2018; 5:00pm		Report		Pairc Tailteann; Referee: Martin Griffin (Simonstown Gaels)

16 September 2018; 5:30pm	Longwood	1-10 - 0-12	Ballinabrackey	Pairc Tailteann; Referee: Padraic Coyle (Curraha)
16 September 2018; 5:30pm		Report		Pairc Tailteann; Referee: Padraic Coyle (Curraha)

=== Final ===
30 September 2018; 3.30pm	Longwood	0-11 - 0-7	Ballinlough	Pairc Tailteann; Referee: Paul Mooney (Syddan)
30 September 2018; 3.30pm		Report		Pairc Tailteann; Referee: Paul Mooney (Syddan)

== Relegation play-off group ==
The three bottom teams from each group entered the relegation play-off group and play each other in a round robin basis.

The team with the worst record after two matches will be relegated to the 2019 Junior 'A' Championship.

Team	Pld	W	L	D	PF	PA	PD	Pts
Kilmainham	1	1	0	0	23	9	+14	2
Castletown	1	1	0	0	17	14	+3	2
St. Ultan's	2	0	2	0	23	40	-17	0

- Game 1: Kilmainham 4-11, 0-9 St. Ultan's, Cortown, 7/9/2018,
- Game 2: Castletown 0-17- 1-11 St. Ultan's, Carlanstown 24/9/2018,
- Game 3: Castletown -vs- Kilmainham, (not required)

== Leinster Intermediate Club Football Championship ==
Round 1:

- St. Mochta's 1-10, 0-11 Longwood, Ardee, 29/10/2018,
