= 1927 Meath Intermediate Football Championship =

Meath I.F.C.
- Season: 1927
- Champions: Castletown; 1st Intermediate Football Championship title
- Relegated: Kilbeg; Nobber

The 1927 Meath Intermediate Football Championship was the 1st edition of the Meath GAA's premier club Gaelic football tournament for intermediate graded teams in County Meath, Ireland. The competition was established to cater for the champions of each division in the 1926 J.F.C. but were unable to make the transition to senior level.

The tournament consisted of 6 teams. The championship employed a league format, with the top finisher being crowned champions.

No team was regraded from the 1926 S.F.C.

At the end of the season, both Kilbeg and Nobber applied to be regraded to the 1928 J.F.C.

Castletown claimed the first Intermediate championship title by finishing clear at the top of the league table. Their triumph was effectively sealed in a winner takes all clash when defeating Oldcastle in Kells on 20 November 1927.

== Team changes ==
The following teams changed division since the 1926 championship season:

=== To I.F.C. ===
Promoted from 1926 J.F.C.

- Boyerstown - (Junior Finalists & Navan District Champions)
- Nobber - (Junior Semi-Finalists & North District Champions)

== Fixtures and results ==
Team	Pld	W	L	D	PF	PA	PD	Pts
Castletown	3	3	0	0	0	0	+0	6
Oldcastle	3	2	1	0	0	0	+0	4
Stamullen	1	1	0	0	0	0	+0	2
Boyerstown	2	1	1	0	0	0	+0	2
Nobber	3	0	3	0	0	0	+0	0
Kilbeg	2	0	2	0	0	0	+0	0

Round 1:

- Nobber -vs- Kilbeg, Castletown, 19/6/1927,
- Oldcastle -vs- Stamullen, Pairc Tailteann, 3/7/1927,
- Castletown w, l Boyerstown, Martry, 24/7/1927,

Round 2:

- Castletown 6-0, 1-3 Nobber, Drumconrath, 3/7/1927,
- Oldcastle 2-2, 0-2 Kilbeg, Kells, 16/10/1927,
- Boyerstown -vs- Stamullen,

Round 3:

- Stamullen -vs- Nobber, Slane, 24/7/1927,
- Castletown -vs- Kilbeg, Syddan, 7/8/1927,
- Oldcastle -vs- Boyerstown, Ballinlough, 6/11/1927,

Round 4:

- Oldcastle 0-4, 0-3 Nobber, Moynalty, 31/7/1927,
- Castletown -vs- Stamullen, Pairc Tailteann, 11/9/1927,
- Boyerstown -vs- Kilbeg,

Round 5:

- Stamullen 1-3, 1-1 Kilbeg, Slane, 23/10/1927,
- Boyerstown 2-4, 0-1 Nobber, Pairc Tailteann, 16/10/1927,
- Castletown 1-4, 2-2 Oldcastle, Kells, 20/11/1927, *

- Oldcastle were later found to have fielded an ineligible player and the points and hence the title was awarded to Castletown.
