= Davy Byrne (Dublin footballer) =

Irish Gaelic footballer

Personal information
- Born: 1971 or 1972 (age 54–55) Dublin, Ireland

Sport
- Sport: Gaelic football
- Position: Goalkeeper
Clubs
- Years: Club
- Ballymun Kickhams; Ratoath
Inter-county
- Years: County
- 1998–2002: Dublin

David Byrne (born 1971/1972) is an Irish Gaelic football manager and former player.

Byrne played his club football for Ballymun Kickhams and represented Dublin at inter-county level. He initially backed up John O'Leary and was a member of the panel of the side that won the All-Ireland Senior Football Championship in 1995. He made his championship debut in 1998, following O'Leary's retirement. Byrne then became the first-choice goalkeeper, but later struggled with injuries towards the end of his career. He announced his retirement in 2002, where he was succeeded by Stephen Cluxton. The next year, he transferred to County Meath club Ratoath, which was a junior team at the time.

Byrne began his managerial career with Ratoath, stepping down in 2012, to join the management team of his former Dublin teammate Jim Gavin, reuniting with Cluxton as goalkeeper coach. He was named manager of Ratoath for the 2019 season, but after leading the club to their first senior football title, Byrne left on acrimonious terms and was replaced by Brian Farrell. He then had a short stint with Skryne.
