= 2019 Meath Intermediate Football Championship =

Meath I.F.C.
- Season: 2019
- Champions: Nobber
- Relegated: n/a
- Leinster ICFC: ???
- All Ireland ICFC: ???

The 2019 Meath Intermediate Football Championship was the 93rd edition of the Meath GAA's premier club Gaelic football tournament for Intermediate graded teams in County Meath, Ireland. The tournament consists of 18 teams, with the winner going on to represent Meath in the Leinster Intermediate Club Football Championship. The championship starts with a group stage and then progresses to a knock out stage.

Longwood (who in 2019 will compete at senior level) were the previous years champions after they defeated Ballinlough in the 2018 decider.

Blackhall Gaels returned to the I.F.C. for the first time since 2001, after suffering relegation from the S.F.C. in 2018. Their 17-year tenure in the top-flight brought a Keegan Cup triumph to the club in 2003.

St. Peter's Dunboyne 'B's were promoted to the middle grade after claiming the J.F.C. crown in 2018 with an extra-time final victory over St. Vincent's. This is the first time that a reserve side from the club has been ranked in the I.F.C. They now join Donaghmore/Ashbourne 'B's as the two clubs with reserve sides in the I.F.C.

On 26 October 2019, Nobber claimed their third I.F.C. title and secured their return to senior ranks for the first time since 2013 when defeating Trim 4–16 to 0–13 in the final at Pairc Tailteann. Brian Farrell and Brendan Heffernan raised the Mattie McDonnell Cup as joint-captains while Thomas Murtagh claimed the "Man-of-the-Match" award for his performance.

The draw for the group stages of the championship were made on 4 March 2019 with the games commencing on 4 April 2019.

== Championship structure change proposals ==
In 2019:

- 3 teams shall be relegated from the S.F.C. to the I.F.C. in 2019. The 2019 I.F.C. champions will be promoted to S.F.C. for 2020.
- No team will be relegated from the I.F.C. in 2019.
- The two best placed J.F.C. first teams in 2019 shall be promoted to the I.F.C. for 2020. This shall include the 2019 J.F.C. Champions (if a first team) and the J.F.C. runner-up (if a first team). If necessary a play-off shall take place between the beaten J.F.C. semi-finalists (if first teams).
- Any second team competing in the 2019 I.F.C. (Donaghmore/Ashbourne 'B's and St. Peter's Dunboyne 'B's) shall be regraded to a new Premier A grade (a new championship grade exclusively for reserve sides) for 2020.

In 2020:

- The I.F.C. shall consist of 20 teams drawn randomly in five groups each containing four teams.
- The top two teams in each group shall contest the knock-out stages in a predetermined draw.

== Team changes ==
The following teams have changed division since the 2018 championship season.

=== From I.F.C. ===
Promoted to 2019 S.F.C.

- Longwood - (Intermediate Champions)

Relegated to 2019 J.F.C.

- St. Ultan's

=== To I.F.C. ===
Relegated from 2018 S.F.C.

- Blackhall Gaels

Promoted from 2018 J.F.C.

- St. Peter's Dunboyne 'B' - (Junior 'A' Champions)

== Participating teams ==
The teams taking part in the 2019 Meath Intermediate Football Championship are:

Club	Location	Management	2018 Championship Position	2019 Championship Position
Ballinabrackey	Ballinabrackey	Darren Bannon	Semi-Finalist	Preliminary Quarter-Finalist
Ballinlough	Ballinlough & Kilskyre	Stephen Baxter	Runners-up	Non Qualifier
Bective	Navan	Davy Hosie	Non Qualifier	Non Qualifier
Castletown	Castletown	John Tiernan & James Quaile	Relegation Playoff	Semi-Finalist
Blackhall Gaels	Ashbourne	Mark Crampton	Relegated from 2018 S.F.C.	Non Qualifier
Donaghmore/Ashbourne 'B'	Ashbourne	Vincent Carton	Non Qualifier	Non Qualifier
Drumbaragh Emmets	Drumbaragh, Kells	Conor Brennan	Non Qualifier	Non Qualifier
Duleek/Bellewstown	Duleek & Bellewstown	Anthony Malone	Preliminary Quarter-Finalist	Quarter-Finalist
Dunderry	Dunderry	David Callaghan	Quarter-Finalist	Quarter-Finalist
Kilmainham	Kilmainham, Kells	Martin McGovern	Relegation Playoff	Non Qualifier
Meath Hill	Meath Hill	Paddy Martin	Non Qualifier	Quarter-Finalist
Nobber	Nobber	Seán Carolan & Gordon Weldon	Non Qualifier	Champions
Oldcastle	Oldcastle	Leo McEnroe	Semi-Finalist	Semi-Finalist
St. Michael's	Carlanstown & Kilbeg	David Wright	Quarter-Finalist	Non Qualifier
St. Peter's Dunboyne 'B'	Dunboyne	Ger Robinson	Junior Champions	Non Qualifier
Syddan	Lobinstown	Myles Byrne	Quarter-Finalist	Non Qualifier
Trim	St Lomans Park, Trim	Brendan Murphy	Quarter-Finalist	Finalists
Walterstown	Navan	Joe Treanor	Non Qualifier	Quarter-Finalist

== Group stage ==
There are three groups of six teams called Group A, B and C. The 1st and 2nd placed teams in Groups A, B and C along with the 3rd placed team in Group A automatically qualify for the quarter-finals. The third placed teams in Groups B and C engage in the Preliminary Quarter-Final to determine the team that completes the quarter-finals lineup. There will be no Relegation Play-Off in 2019.

The draw for the group stages of the championship were made on 4 March 2019 with the games commencing on 4 April 2019.

=== Group A ===
Team	Pld	W	L	D	PF	PA	PD	Pts
Nobber	5	4	0	1	76	64	+12	9
Meath Hill	5	3	1	1	65	51	+14	7
Oldcastle	5	3	1	1	82	57	+25	7
Ballinlough	5	2	2	1	73	72	+1	5
Drumbaragh	5	1	4	0	67	84	-17	2
Kilmainham	5	0	5	0	59	94	-35	0

Meath Hill were ranked above Oldcastle due to the head-to-head result between the two teams.

Round 1

- Ballinlough 0-17, 1-13 Drumbaragh, Pairc Tailteann, 6/4/2019,
- Meath Hill 1-9, 0-9 Kilmainham, Pairc Tailteann, 6/4/2019,
- Oldcastle 0–12, 1-9 Nobber, Carnaross, 7/4/2019,

Round 2

- Oldcastle 2-11, 0-6 Ballinlough, Pairc Tailteann, 14/4/2019,
- Drumbaragh 1-12, 1-10 Kilmainham, Pairc Tailteann, 21/4/2019,
- Nobber 0-9, 0-7 Meath Hill, Drumconrath, 21/4/2019,

Round 3

- Ballinlough 2-17, 0-11 Kilmainham, Carlanstown, 9/8/2019,
- Meath Hill 1-16, 0-9 Oldcastle, Ballinlough, 11/8/2019,
- Nobber 3-13, 2-10 Drumbaragh, Meath Hill, 17/8/2019,

Round 4

- Nobber 1-13, 1-11 Ballinlough, Castletown, 23/8/2019,
- Oldcastle 3-18, 1-8 Kilmainham, Moynalty, 25/8/2019,
- Meath Hill 1-12, 0-12 Drumbaragh, Nobber, 25/8/2019,

Round 5

- Nobber 2-11, 2-9 Kilmainham, Cortown, 6/9/2019,
- Oldcastle 2-11, 0-8 Drumbaragh, Moynalty, 6/9/2019,
- Meath Hill 1–9, 0-12 Ballinlough, Castletown, 6/9/2019,

=== Group B ===
Team	Pld	W	L	D	PF	PA	PD	Pts
Trim	5	4	1	0	82	72	+10	8
Castletown	5	4	1	0	88	69	+19	8
Ballinabrackey	5	3	2	0	76	59	+17	6
St. Michael's	5	1	3	1	84	93	-9	3
Bective	4	1	3	0	68	90	-22	2
Syddan	4	0	3	1	57	72	-15	1

Trim are ranked above Castletown due to the head-to-head result between the two sides.

Round 1

- St. Michael's 4-12, 4-9 Bective, Castletown, 5/4/2019,
- Castletown 1-16, 1-7 Syddan, Pairc Tailteann, 6/4/2019,
- Trim 1-11, 1-9 Ballinabrackey, Longwood, 5/4/2019,

Round 2

- Castletown 2-8, 0-12 Ballinabrackey, Athboy, 20/4/2019,
- Syddan 2–16, 2-16 St. Michael's, Meath Hill, 20/4/2019,
- Bective 4-10, 3-11 Trim, Bohermeen, 21/4/2019,

Round 3

- Trim 0-12, 1-8 Syddan Pairc Tailteann, 10/8/2019,
- Ballinabrackey 2-11, 0-4 Bective Trim, 11/8/2019,
- Castletown 1-11, 0-8 St. Michael's, Drumconrath, 13/8/2019,

Round 4

- Trim 2-13, 3-7 St. Michael's, Cortown, 24/8/2019,
- Ballinabrackey 3-10, 1-11 Syddan, Pairc Tailteann, 25/8/2019,
- Castletown 5-14, 3-12 Bective, Rathkenny, 25/8/2019,

Round 5

- Trim 2-12, 1-9 Castletown, Ballinlough, 8/9/2019,
- Ballinabrackey 2-11, 1-11 St. Michael's, Trim, 8/9/2019,
- Syddan null/void Bective, Rathkenny, 15/9/2019,

=== Group C ===
Team	Pld	W	L	D	PF	PA	PD	Pts
Dunderry	5	4	1	0	104	64	+40	8
Duleek/Bellewstown	5	4	1	0	91	59	+32	8
Walterstown	5	4	1	0	80	70	+10	8
Blackhall Gaels	5	2	3	0	58	76	-18	4
St. Peter's Dunboyne 'B'	5	1	4	0	78	98	-20	2
Donaghmore/Ashbourne 'B'	5	0	4	0	65	109	-44	0

Head-to-head results can't separate Dunderry, Duleek/Bellewstown and Walterstown so each team's score difference comes into effect.

Round 1

- Duleek/Bellewstown 1-21, 1-8 St. Peter's Dunboyne 'B', Ratoath, 6/4/2019,
- Dunderry 2-14, 0-13 Walterstown, Pairc Tailteann, 7/4/2019,
- Blackhall Gaels 1-8, 1-6 Donaghmore/Ashbourne 'B', Dunshaughlin, 7/4/2019,

Round 2

- Dunderry 1-20, 0-10 Blackhall Gaels, Moynalvey, 20/4/2019,
- Walterstown 0-14, 0-9 Duleek/Bellewstown, Ratoath, 21/4/2019,
- St. Peter's Dunboyne 'B' 4-12, 1-12 Donaghmore/Ashbourne 'B', Skryne, 21/4/2019,

Round 3

- Duleek/Bellewstown 1-10 0-11 Dunderry, Donore, 10/8/2019,
- Blackhall Gaels 0-15 1-11 St. Peter's Dunboyne 'B', Kilbride, 10/8/2019,
- Walterstown 1-15, 1-12 Donaghmore/Ashbourne 'B', Dunshaughlin, 11/8/2019,

Round 4

- Duleek/Bellewstown 2-9, 0-11 Blackhall Gaels, Ardcath, 25/8/2019,
- Walterstown 2-14, 2-9 St. Peter's Dunboyne 'B', Dunsany, 25/8/2019,
- Dunderry 2-20, 2-8 Donaghmore/Ashbourne 'B', Walterstown, 25/8/2019,

Round 5

- Walterstown 0-15, 0-11 Blackhall Gaels, Summerhill, 8/9/2019,
- Duleek/Bellewstown 3-21, 2-6 Donaghmore/Ashbourne 'B', Ardcath, 8/9/2019,
- Dunderry 3-15, 1-11 St. Peter's Dunboyne 'B', Dunshaughlin, 8/9/2019,

== Knock-out stage ==
The 1st and 2nd placed teams in Groups A, B and C along with the 3rd placed team in Group A automatically qualify for the quarter-finals. The third placed teams in Groups B and C engage in the Preliminary Quarter-Final to determine the team that completes the quarter-finals lineup.

Preliminary round
Ballinabrackey	0-9
Walterstown	0-10

Quarter-Finals
Nobber	1-12
Walterstown	0-13
Meath Hill	1-11
Castletown	1-14
Trim	0-16
Duleek/Bellewstown	0-15
Dunderry	2-07
Oldcastle	2-12

Semi-Finals
Nobber	2-18
Castletown	1-17
Trim	2-12
Oldcastle	0-9

Final
Nobber	4-16
Trim	0-13

=== Preliminary quarter-final ===
21 September 2019 Preliminary Quarter-Final	Walterstown	0-10 – 0-9	Ballinabrackey	Clonard
17:00 IST (UTC+1)				Venue: Clonard
		Report		Referee: Colm McManus

=== Quarter-finals ===
28 September 2019 Quarter-Final 3	Trim	0-16 – 0-15	Duleek/Bellewstown	Simonstown
18:00 IST (UTC+1)
		Report

29 September 2019 Quarter-Final 2	Castletown	1-14 – 1-11	Meath Hill	Navan
14:00 IST (UTC+1)				Venue: Pairc Tailteann
		Report

29 September 2019 Quarter-Final 4	Oldcastle	2-12 – 2-7	Dunderry	Ballinlough
14:00 IST (UTC+1)
		Report

29 September 2019 Quarter-Final 1	Nobber	1-12 – 0-13	Walterstown	Trim
15:45 IST (UTC+1)
		Report

=== Semi-finals ===
13 October 2019 Semi-Final 1	Nobber	2-18 – 1-17 (a.e.t.)	Castletown	Navan
15:00 IST (UTC+1)				Venue: Pairc Tailteann
		Report

13 October 2019 Semi-Final 2	Trim	2-12 – 0-9	Oldcastle	Navan
15:00 IST (UTC+1)				Venue: Pairc Tailteann
		Report

=== Final ===
27 October 2019 Final	Nobber	4-16 – 0-13	Trim	Navan
15:00 IST (UTC+1)				Venue: Pairc Tailteann
		Report
