= 2015 Meath Intermediate Football Championship =

Meath I.F.C.
- Season: 2015
- Promoted: Ratoath (1st I.F.C. Title)
- Relegated: Clann na nGael
- Leinster ICFC: Ratoath (Final); Ratoath 2-13, 2-9 Athlone
- All Ireland ICFC: Ratoath (Semi-Final); Ratoath 1-5, 2-20 St. Mary's Cahirciveen
- Matches: 55

The 2015 Meath Intermediate Football Championship is the 89th edition of the Meath GAA's premier club Gaelic football tournament for intermediate graded teams in County Meath, Ireland. The tournament consists of 18 teams, with the winner going on to represent Meath in the Leinster Intermediate Club Football Championship. The championship starts with a group stage and then progresses to a knock out stage.

The draw for the group stages of the championship were made on 9 February 2015 with the games commencing on the weekend of 10 April 2015.

Cortown were promoted to the middle grade after a three-year exodus when securing the J.F.C. crown last year.

This was Oldcastle's return to the Intermediate grade after five years as a senior club since being relegated last year.

Clann na nGael were relegated tho the J.F.C. after eight years in the middle grade.

On 4 October 2015, Ratoath claimed their first ever I.F.C. title (since beginning to field football teams in 1956) when overcoming Nobber 1-15 to 0-5 in Pairc Tailteann and hence earning promotion to the S.F.C. for the first time in their history. After winning the Meath I.F.C. Ratoath also made history by winning their first Leinster Intermediate Club Football Championship and became only the second Meath club to win this honour after Wolfe Tones in 2004. They beat Athlone of Westmeath in the final. Their journey came to an end at the All-Ireland semi-final stage when losing to Kerry I.F.C. champions St. Mary's Cahirciveen who featured former All-Star and Kerry Bryan Sheehan.

== Team changes ==
The following teams have changed division since the 2014 championship season.

=== From I.F.C. ===
Promoted to S.F.C.

- Ballinlough - (Intermediate Champions)

Relegated to 2015 J.F.C.

- Carnaross

=== To I.F.C. ===
Relegated from 2013 S.F.C.

- Oldcastle

Promoted from 2014 J.F.C.

- Cortown - (Junior 'A' Champions)

== Participating teams ==
The teams taking part in the 2015 Meath Intermediate Football Championship are:

Club	Location	2014 Championship Position	2015 Championship Position
Ballinabrackey	Ballinabrackey	Finalists	Quarter-Finalist
Ballivor	Ballivor	Quarter-Finalist	Non Qualifier
Castletown	Castletown	Semi-finalist	Quarter-Finalist
Clann na nGael	Athboy	Preliminary Quarter-Finalist	Relegated
Cortown	Bohermeen	Junior Champions	Non Qualifier
Donaghmore/Ashbourne 'B'	Ashbourne	Non Qualifier	Non Qualifier
Drumbaragh Emmets	Drumbaragh, Kells	Non Qualifier	Relegation Playoff
Dunderry	Dunderry	Quarter-finalist	Non Qualifier
Kilmainham	Kilmainham, Kells	Relegation Playoff	Quarter-finalist
Longwood	Longwood	Non Qualifier	Non Qualifier
Nobber	Nobber	Relegation Playoff	Finalists
Oldcastle	Oldcastle	SFC Relegated	Non Qualifier
Ratoath	Ratoath	Semi-finalist	Champions
St. Colmcille's	Laytown	Quarter-finalist	Semi-finalist
St. Michael's	Carlanstown	Non Qualifier	Quarter-finalist
St. Ultan's	Bohermeen	Non Qualifier	Relegation Playoff
Syddan	Lobinstown	Quarter-Finalist	Preliminary Quarter-finalist
Trim	St Lomans Park, Trim	Non Qualifier	Semi-finalist

== Group stage ==
There are three groups called Group A, B and C. The 2 top finishers in each group and the third-place finisher in Group A will qualify for the quarter-finals. The third placed teams in Group B and C will qualify for a Preliminary Quarter-final, with the winner earning a place in last eight. The bottom finishers of each group will qualify for the Relegation Play Off. The draw for the group stages of the championship were made on 9 February 2015 with the games commencing on the weekend of 10 April 2015.

=== Group A ===
Team	Pld	W	L	D	PF	PA	PD	Pts
Nobber	5	4	0	1	79	43	+36	9
Kilmainham	5	3	0	2	72	47	+25	8
St. Michael's	5	2	1	2	66	65	+1	6
Donaghmore/Ashbourne 'B'	5	2	2	1	48	52	-4	5
Cortown	5	2	3	0	45	73	-28	2
Clann na nGael	5	0	5	0	43	73	-30	0

Round 1

- Cortown 3-10, 1-9 Clann na nGael, Pairc Tailteann, 11/4/2015,
- Kilmainham 1-8, 0-5 Donaghmore/Ashbourne 'B', Walterstown, 11/4/2015,
- Nobber 1-14, 1-9 St. Michael's, Drumconrath, 12/4/2015,

Round 2

- Donaghmore/Ashbourne 'B' 1-6, 1-4 Clann na nGael, Walterstown, 19/4/2015,
- Kilmainham 2-9, 0-15 St. Michael's, Moynalty, 24/4/2015,
- Nobber 2-10, 0-5 Cortown, Carnaross, 24/4/2015,

Round 3

- Nobber 0-15, 0-8 Donaghmore/Ashbourne 'B', Dunsany, 22/5/2015,
- St. Michael's 0-12, 1-6 Cortown, Moynalty, 22/5/2015,
- Kilmainham 0-13, 0-8 Clann na nGael, Simonstown, 24/5/2015,

Round 4

- Nobber 1-10, 0-13 Kilmainham, Kilmainhamwood, 8/8/2015,
- Donaghmore/Ashbourne 'B' 0-13, 0-6 Cortown, Skryne, 8/8/2015,
- St. Michael's 0-14, 1-8 Clann na nGael, Kells, 9/8/2015,

Round 5

- St. Michael's 0-13, 2-7 Donaghmore/Ashbourne 'B', Brews Hill, 21/8/2015,
- Nobber 2-12, 0-5 Clann na nGael, Moynalty, 21/8/2015,
- Kilmainham 1-17, 0-6 Cortown, Carnaross, 21/8/2015,

=== Group B ===
Team	Pld	W	L	D	PF	PA	PD	Pts
Ratoath	5	5	0	0	107	51	+56	10
Trim	5	3	2	0	72	84	-12	6
Castletown	5	2	3	0	65	65	+0	4
Dunderry	5	2	3	0	67	71	-4	4
Ballivor	5	2	3	0	53	67	-14	4
St. Ultan's	5	1	4	0	41	67	-26	2

Round 1

- Dunderry 1-15, 1-6 Ballivor, Cortown, 10/4/2015,
- Ratoath 6-11, 0-12 Trim, Dunsany, 12/4/2015,
- Castletown 0-10, 0-8 St. Ultan's, Simonstown, 17/4/2015,

Round 2

- Trim 1-9, 1-8 Dunderry, Cortown, 17/4/2015,
- Ballivor 2-10, 1-4 St. Ulatn's, Trim, 23/4/2015,
- Ratoath 3-9, 1-9 Castletown, Duleek, 25/4/2015,

Round 3

- Ratoath 2-18, 3-7 Dunderry, Walterstown, 24/5/2015,
- St. Ultan's 0-12, 0-11 Trim, Athboy, 26/5/2015,
- Ballivor 0-9, 0-7 Castletown, Bohermeen, 27/5/2015,

Round 4

- Dunderry 1-10, 1-6 St. Ultan's, Pairc Tailteann, 9/8/2015,
- Ratoath 1-16, 0-5 Ballivor, Trim, 9/8/2015,
- Trim 3-12, 2-12 Castletown, Simonstown, 9/8/2015,

Round 5

- Ratoath 3-8, 0-6 St. Ultan's, Kilmessan, 23/8/2015,
- Trim 2-10, 1-11 Ballivor, Athboy, 23/8/2015,
- Castletown 3-9, 0-9 Dunderry, Kilmainham, 23/8/2015,

=== Group C ===
Team	Pld	W	L	D	PF	PA	PD	Pts
St. Colmcille's	5	4	0	1	95	46	+49	9
Ballinabrackey	5	3	1	1	80	54	+26	7
Syddan	5	2	2	1	74	83	-9	5
Oldcastle	5	1	2	2	51	69	-18	4
Longwood	5	1	3	1	50	83	-33	3
Drumbaragh Emmets	5	1	4	0	61	76	-15	2

Round 1

- St. Colmcille's 1-11, 0-6 Ballinabrackey, Skryne, 10/4/2015,
- Oldcastle 1-8, 0-9 Drumbaragh Emmets, Ballinlough, 12/4/2015,
- Syddan 1-12, 1-11 Longwood, Bective, 12/4/2015,

Round 2

- Ballinabrackey 1-15, 0-7 Longwood, Trim, 18/4/2015,
- St. Colmcille's 1-9, 1-9 Oldcastle, Castletown, 25/4/2015,
- Drumbaragh Emmets 3-10, 0-13 Syddan, Pairc Tailteann, 26/4/2015,

Round 3

- St. Colmcille's 1-21, 2-7 Syddan, Slane, 22/5/2015,
- Ballinabrackey 4-9, 1-5 Oldcastle, Brews Hill, 23/5/2015,
- Longwood 0-15, 1-10 Drumbaragh Emmets, Kildalkey, 26/5/2015,

Round 4

- Ballinabrackey 2-14, 0-10 Drumbaragh Emmets, Pairc Tailteann, 8/8/2015,
- Syddan 2-12, 1-8 Oldcastle, Carlanstown, 9/8/2015,
- St. Colmcille's 3-19, 0-5 Longwood, Trim, 9/8/2015,

Round 5

- Ballinabrackey 1-12, 2-9 Syddan, Athboy, 22/8/2015,
- St. Colmcille's 2-11, 1-7 Drumbaragh Emmets, Drumconrath, 22/8/2015,
- Oldcastle 0-9, 1-6 Longwood, Dunderry, 22/8/2015,

== Knock-out Stages ==
=== Relegation Play Off ===
The three bottom finishers from each group qualify for the relegation play off and play each other in a round robin basis. The team with the worst record after two matches will be relegated to the 2016 Junior Championship.

Team	Pld	W	L	D	PF	PA	PD	Pts
St. Ultan's	1	1	0	0	22	7	+15	2
Drumbaragh Emmets	1	1	0	0	24	14	+10	2
Clann na nGael	2	0	2	0	21	46	-25	0

- Game 1: St. Ultan's 2-16, 0-7 Clann na nGael, Kilmainham, 5/9/2015,
- Game 2: Drumbaragh Emmets 2-18, 1-11 Clann na nGael, Brews Hill, 11/9/2015,

=== Finals ===
The winners and runners up of each group qualify for the quarter-finals along with the third placed finisher of Group A.

Preliminary Quarter-Finals
Castletown	0-15
Syddan	0-9

Quarter-Finals
Nobber	2-18
Castletown	2-9
Trim	1-12
Kilmainham	1-8
Ratoath	4-10
Ballinabrackey	0-8
St. Colmcille's	0-19
St. Michael's	0-9

Semi-Finals
Nobber	0-16 AET
Trim	1-11 AET
Ratoath	1-13
St. Colmcille's	0-10

Final
Nobber	0-5
Ratoath	1-15

Preliminary Quarter-Final:

- Castletown 0-15, 0-9 Syddan, Meath Hill, 30/8/2015,

Quarter-finals:

- St. Colmcille's 0-19, 0-9 St. Michael's, Duleek, 4/9/2015,
- Nobber 2-18, 2-9 Castletown, Drumconrath, 5/9/2015,
- Ratoath 4-10, 0-8 Ballinabrackey, Trim, 5/9/2015,
- Trim 1-12, 1-8 Kilmainham, Athboy, 6/9/2015,

Semi-finals:

- Ratoath 1-13, 0-10 St. Colmcille's, Duleek, 21/9/2015,
- Nobber 0-16, 1-11 Trim, Simonstown, 22/9/2015, (A.E.T.)

Final:

- Ratoath 1-15, 0-5 Nobber, Pairc Tailteann, 4/10/2015,

== Leinster Intermediate Club Football Championship ==
Preliminary round:

- St. Patrick's Donabate 0-11, 2-12 Ratoath, Donabate, 17/10/2015,

Quarter-final:

- Ratoath 2-19, 0-6 Railyard, Ratoath, 1/11/2015,

Semi-final:

- Ratoath 3-13, 1-6 Castledermot, Ratoath, 15/11/2015,

Final:

- Athlone 2-9, 2-13 Ratoath, Cusack Park, 29/11/2015,

== All-Ireland Intermediate Club Football Championship ==
Semi-final:

- St. Mary's Cahirciveen 2-20, 1-5 Ratoath, Gaelic Grounds, 24/1/2016
