= Brian Farrell (Gaelic footballer) =

Irish Gaelic footballer

Personal information
- Native name: Briain Ó Fearail (Irish)
- Born: Nobber, County Meath, Ireland

Sport
- Sport: Gaelic football
- Position: Full Forward
Club
- Years: Club
- Nobber
Inter-county
- Years: County
- 2004–2019: Meath
Inter-county titles
- Leinster titles: 1

Brian Farrell is a Gaelic football player and coach, he formerly played for his local club Nobber and the Meath county team.

He first came to national attention when he was part of the Meath team that made it to the 2002 All-Ireland Minor Football Championship final but lost out to Derry having already been beaten by Longford in the Leinster Championship final. The following year, he was part of the Meath side that won the Leinster and All-Ireland Junior Football Championships. At club level, he has won County and Leinster Junior medals in 2002 and an All-Ireland Junior Club Football Championship medal in 2003. In 2010, Farrell won a Meath Intermediate Football Championship medal.
