= Ratoath GAA =

Gaelic games club in County Meath, Ireland

- C.L.G. Rath Tó
- Founded: 1903
- County: Meath
- Grounds: Seán Eiffe Park
- Coordinates: 53°30′37″N 6°28′42″W

Playing kits
Standard colours

Senior Club Championships
	All Ireland	Leinster champions	Meath champions
Football:	0	0	3
Hurling:	0	0	2

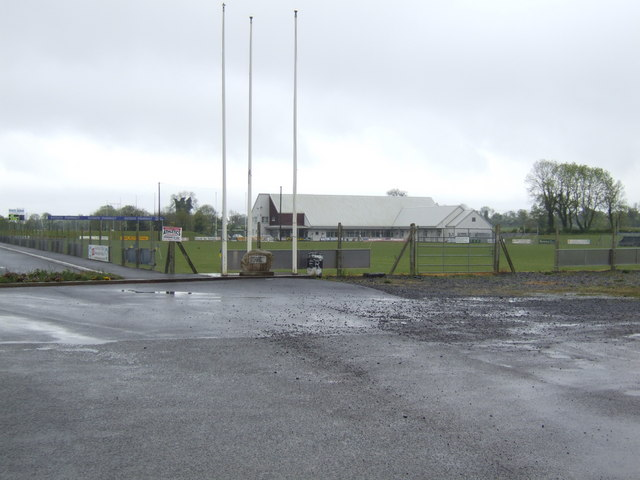
Seán Eiffe Park (2007 photo)

Ratoath GAA is a Gaelic Athletic Association football and hurling club based in and around the town of Ratoath, in County Meath, Ireland. The club plays Gaelic Football competing in Meath GAA & Leinster competitions. The club plies their trade in the Meath Senior Football Championship since 2016 and won their first Meath Senior Football Championship in 2019. The club has tasted Senior success in hurling, winning the Meath Senior Hurling Championship in 1963 and are senior hurling champions for 2024 since winning the 2016 Meath Intermediate Hurling Championship.

== History ==
Ratoath was founded in 1903, however in this period it was solely a hurling club. Ratoath won a Senior Hurling League title in 1912 (the first recorded honour for the club) and Junior Hurling Championships in 1929, '31, '40 and '57. For much of the 1950s, Ratoath amalgamated with surrounding clubs (Kiltale, Batterstown, Drumree, Skryne and some Priests from Warrenstown College) and won two Meath Senior Hurling Championships known as St. Patrick's in 1953 and '54. The 1960s were a golden period for Ratoath hurling. In 1960, Ratoath contested their first S.H.C. final, beaten by Trim on the day, however in 1963 they defeated St. Peter's Dunboyne to claim their first and only S.H.C. title. Down by 11 points during the second half, Ratoath battled to emerge victorious by a scoreline of 9–3 to 6–11 (30 points to 29). Ratoath went on to contest three more S.H.C. finals but lost out to Athboy (1967 & '68) and Kilmessan ('69). In 1981 and '83, Ratoath contested I.H.C. finals but were defeated by Kilskyre and Dunshaughlin respectively.

Ratoath went on to annexe another J.H.C. title in 1989, beating Kilmessan in the final.

Ratoath won the 2016 Meath Intermediate hurling championship by beating Kilskyre/Moylagh in the final. This win meant that they were Meath's representatives in that year's Leinster Junior Club Hurling Championship where they defeated Carlow Town Hurling Club 2-20 to 2-9, Clodiagh Gaels (Offaly) 1-13 to 2-8 and Rosenallis (Laois) 1-20 to 1-16 after extra time to reach the final. They met Mooncoin (Kilkenny) in the Leinster final but were defeated 1-16 to 0-12. Mooncoin reached the 2016–17 All-Ireland Junior Club Hurling Championship final and were defeated by Mayfield (Cork)

In their first season back in the Senior hurling championship, Ratoath made the quarter-finals by beating Longwood, Clann na nGael and Trim in the group stages. They were beaten in the quarter-final by eventual runners up, Kildalkey. Ratoath reached the Senior Hurling Championship Final in both 2020 and 2022. However, on both occasions, they were beaten by Trim. In 2023, they returned to the Senior Hurling Championship Final but lost again, this time to Kildalkey. They won their first Senior Hurling Championship in 61 years in 2024 by beating Trim, 2-15 to 1-16. They retained the title in 2025, beating Kiltale 2-22 to 4-10 in the final replay. In the 2025–26 All-Ireland Intermediate Club Hurling Championship, Ratoath reached the Leinster final by beating Carnew Emmets and Lusmagh. Despite leading for long periods, they were beaten by Kilkenny Intermediate champions, Danesfort, 2-15 to 0-12.

The football section of Ratoath was founded in 1956 and they took part in the Meath Junior Football Championship. A J.F.C. wasn't attained until 1970 however, when they beat Navan O'Mahonys second string in the final. J.F.C. finals were reached 1992 and 2003, losing to Gaeil Colmcille's second string and Wolfe Tones respectively (Wolfe Tones went on to win the All-Ireland Junior Title. 2004 was a monumental year for the club. A J.F.C. title was claimed when beating Dunsany in the final, and Ratoath also went on to claim provincial honours. The Leinster Junior Club Football Championship was won with a final victory over Kilclonfert of Offaly, however in the All-Ireland semi-final, they bowed out to Stewartstown Harps of Tyrone. Their time in the Intermediate ranks were short lived though and the club soon dropped down to Junior once more. Moynalvey defeated them in the J.F.C. final of 2008 but Ratoath made amends for this in 2012, when a youthful squad defeated local rivals Donaghmore/Ashbourne's second string 1–11 to 1–10.

Following this after just three years in the Intermediate ranks, Ratoath claimed their first Meath Intermediate Football Championship title when beating Nobber 1–15 to 0–5 with no fewer than five clubmen representing the Meath county seniors, and hence moving up to the Meath Senior Football Championship for the first time in the club's history. Ratoath went on to win beat St. Patrick's Donabate (Dublin), Railyard (Kilkenny), Castledermot (Kildare) and Athlone (Westmeath) to win the 2015 Leinster Intermediate Club Football Championship and bring the Seán Eiffe trophy back to Seán Eiffe Park. Ratoath were defeated by St. Mary's Cahirciveen in the All-Ireland Intermediate Club Football Championship who went on to win the final.

After being beaten at the quarter-final stage in the Senior Football Championship in 2017 and 2018, Ratoath, managed by Davy Byrne, went on to win their first ever senior football title in 2019 by beating Summerhill 3-15 to 2-13 in the final. Ratoath forward Joey Wallace was awarded the man of the match. Ratoath retained their senior football title in 2020 by beating Gaeil Colmcille in the final 1-14 to 1-13. Joey Wallace scored the winning goal in 9th minute of injury time and was awarded man of the match for the second year in a row. Ratoath relinquished the Keegan Cup in 2021, losing to eventual champions Wolfe Tones in the semi-final. However, they regained it in 2022, beating Summerhill by 0-12 to 0-11 in the final with Jack Flynn being awarded the man of the match.

Joined with Donaghmore, Meath Minor Football Championship honours were claimed in 1977 and '79 and in 1987 another title at the same level was gained, this time with St. Martin's. In 2011 Ratoath won their first ever M.F.C. beating Moynalvey in the final, and they successfully defended their title a year later this time against Donaghmore/Ashbourne. They regained the title in 2017 by beating Na Fianna in the final.

U-21 Football Championship titles were garnered in 2013 and '14 with wins over Donaghmore/Ashbourne (0–12 to 1–8) and Navan O'Mahonys (1–13 to 1–8) respectively. Their third U-21 Football Championship was added in 2019, beating St. Peter's, Dunboyne 1-15 to 0-8 in the final.

Ratoath won their first U-21 Hurling Championship title in 2017 by beating Na Fianna 1–11 to 1–9 in the final.

== Honours ==
- Meath Senior Football Championship:3
  - 2019, 2020, 2022
- Leinster Intermediate Club Football Championship:1
  - 2015
- Meath Senior Hurling Championship: 3
  - 1963, 2024, 2025
- Meath Intermediate Football Championship: 1
  - 2015
- Meath Intermediate Hurling Championship: 1
  - 1963, 2016
- Meath Junior Football Championship: 3
  - 1971, 2004, 2012
- Leinster Junior Club Football Championship: 1
  - 2004
- Meath Junior Hurling Championship: 5
  - 1929, 1931, 1940, 1957, 1989
- Meath Minor Football Championship:: 4
  - 2011, 2012, 2017, 2024
- Meath Under-21 Football Championship: 3
  - 2013, 2014, 2019
- Meath Under-21 Hurling Championship: 1
  - 2017
- Meath Under-19 Football Championship:1
  - 2018
- Meath Under-17 Football Championship: 1
  - 2017
- Meath Under-17 Hurling Championship: 1
  - 2017
