= Brendan Murphy (Meath footballer) =

Irish footballer

Personal information
- Date of birth: 19 August 1975 (age 51)
- Place of birth: Wexford, Ireland

Senior career*
Years	Team	Apps	(Gls)
1992–1994	Bradford City		
1994–1999	Wimbledon		
1999–2000	Dundalk		
2000–2002	Kidderminster Harriers		
2008–2008	Longford Town		

International career
	Republic of Ireland U21	8	(0)
	Republic of Ireland B	1	(0)
- * Club domestic league appearances and goals

Brendan Murphy (born 19 August 1975) is an Irish former footballer who played soccer for the Republic of Ireland U21 and B national teams and Gaelic football for the Meath county team.

== Career ==
=== Soccer ===
Murphy played as a goalkeeper with Bradford City and Wimbledon where he played for 5 seasons. Murphy did not play in a league match for Wimbledon, but he appeared in Intertoto Cup matches. In 1999 Murphy moved back to Ireland where he played for a season with Dundalk before returning to play his final 2-year stint in England with Kidderminster Harriers in 2000. Murphy won eight Republic of Ireland under-21 caps and one B cap. He was also called up to the senior team by manager Mick McCarthy for an away international friendly match against Wales in 1997, although he remained an unused substitute.

Brendan Murphy
Personal information
- Native name: Breandán Ó Murchú (Irish)
- Born: 19 August 1975 (age 51) Wexford, Ireland
- Height: 1.91 m (6 ft 3 in)

Sport
- Sport: Gaelic football
- Position: Goalkeeper
Club
- Years: Club
- 2004–2011: Trim
Inter-county
- Years: County
- 2004–2011: Meath
Inter-county titles
- Leinster titles: 1
- All Stars: Nominee 2007

=== Gaelic football ===
Murphy subsequently returned home to Trim, County Meath where he began playing Gaelic football for Trim GAA. In 2005, he was called up to the senior Meath county squad under Seán Boylan. He made his senior inter-county debut on 9 January in an O'Byrne Cup match against Kildare. He made his championship debut in 2006 v Louth. Apart from a brief exit from the squad in 2009 Murphy played until the age of 35 and retired in 2011. In 2012, he was appointed Meath goalkeeping coach. He was an all star nominee in 2007.

== Honours ==
- Leinster Senior Football Championship (1): 2010
- All-Ireland and Leinster Minor Football Championship (1): 1992

Leinster minor football 1993

- NFL division 2 winner 2007
- All star nominee 2007
