= Simonstown Gaels GAA =

Gaelic games club in County Meath, Ireland

Simonstown Gaels
- Gaeil Baile Shíomóin
- Founded: 1965
- County: Meath
- Colours: Blue
- Grounds: Simonstown Batterstown

Playing kits
Standard colours

Senior Club Championships
	All Ireland	Leinster champions	Meath champions
Football:	-	-	2
Hurling:	-	-	0

Simonstown Gaels GFC (Irish: Gaeil Baile Shíomóin) is a Gaelic football club based in the town of Navan, in County Meath, Ireland. The club mainly plays Gaelic football. In 2003 and 2004 the team reached the Meath Senior Football Championship final. The Simonstown club also has ladies' teams from academy to senior level.

== Honours ==
- Meath Senior Football Championship (2): 2016, 2017
- Meath Intermediate Football Championship (1): 1995
- Meath Junior Football Championship (1): 1990
