= Duleek/Bellewstown GAA =

Gaelic football club in County Meath, Ireland

Duleek/Bellewstown
- Damhliag/Baile an Bheileogaigh
- County: Meath
- Colours: Green and Yellow
- Grounds: Duleek/Bellewstown

Playing kits
Standard colours

Senior Club Championships
	All Ireland	Leinster champions	Meath champions
Football:	0	0	1

Duleek/Bellewstown is a Gaelic Athletic Association club based in Duleek, in County Meath, Ireland. The club, which also takes players from the Bellewstown area, plays football in Meath GAA competitions. Duleek won the Meath Senior Football Championship once in 1943 and was their only Senior Football Championship wins. As of 2025, the club was competing at intermediate level.

== Honours ==
- Meath Senior Football Championship (1): 1943
- Meath Intermediate Football Championship (5): 1939, 1955, 1966, 1978, 2005
- Meath Junior Football Championship (3): 1921, 1935, 1995

Preceded by Donaghmore	Meath Senior Football Champions; 1943	Succeeded by Skryne
