= Nobber GAA =

Gaelic games club in County Meath, Ireland

Nobber GFC
- CLG An Obair
- County: Meath
- Colours: Black and amber

Playing kits
Standard colours

Senior Club Championships
	All Ireland	Leinster champions	Meath champions
Football:	0	0	0

Nobber GFC is a Gaelic Athletic Association club based in Nobber, County Meath, Ireland. The club fields Gaelic football teams in competitions organised by Meath GAA. The club was one of several that contributed to the North Meath divisional side that won the Meath Senior Football Championship in 1950. In 1983, 1986 and 1989, Nobber reached the semi-final of the Meath Senior club championship. The club won the Meath Intermediate Football Championship in 1980, 2010 and 2019. As of 2025, the club are due to compete in the Meath Junior Football Championship.

== Honours ==
- All-Ireland Intermediate Football Sevens (1): 2011
- Leinster Intermediate Club Football Championship (0): (runners-up in 2010)
- Meath Intermediate Football Championship (3): 1980, 2010, 2019
- All-Ireland Junior Club Football Championship (1): 2003
- Leinster Junior Club Football Championship (1): 2002
- Meath Junior Football Championship (2): 1946, 2002

== Notable players ==
- Brian Farrell

Preceded by Oldcastle	Meath Intermediate Football Champions; 2010	Succeeded by Moynalvey
Preceded by Drumgoon	All Ireland Junior Club Football Champions; 2002	Succeeded by Wolfe Tones
