= Carnaross GFC =

Gaelic sports club in County Meath, Ireland

Carnaross
- Carn na Ros
- Founded: 1888
- County: Meath
- Colours
- Grounds: Páirc Naomh Chiarán

Playing kits
Standard colours

Senior Club Championships
| | All Ireland | Leinster champions | Meath champions |
|---|---|---|---|
| Football: | 0 | 0 | 0 |

Carnaross GFC is a Gaelic Athletic Association club in Carnaross, County Meath, Ireland. The club is affiliated to the Meath County Board and fields teams primarily in Gaelic football.

== History ==
Located in the village of Carnaross, approximately 6 km from Kells, Carnaross GFC was founded in 1888. Carnaross won their first final in the Meath JFC in 1912 against Skryne. The following year they made it to their only Meath SFC final against Bohermeen, but Carnaross awarded them a walkover.

Carnaross have contested 10 Meath JFC finals, winning 5 and losing 5. Their last JFC final, as of 2026, was in 1991 where they beat Drumree 1–14 to 0-05.

Carnaross have won 2 Meath IFC finals each in 1957 and 1993. Carnaross would compete in two other Meath IFC finals in 2003 and 2010, losing both of them.

Carnaross were relegated from the Meath IFC in 2014, and were then relegated to the Meath JBFC. They won the JBFC in 2024, and as of 2026 compete in the Meath JFC.

== Honours ==
- Meath Senior Football Championship (0): (runners-up in 1913)
- Meath Intermediate Football Championship (2): 1957, 1993 (runners-up in 2003, 2010)
- Meath Junior 'A' Football Championship (5): 1912, 1929, 1941, 1955, 1991 (runners-up in 1887, 1950, 1952, 1988, 1989)
- Meath Junior 'B' Football Championship (1): 2024

== Notable Players ==
- P.J. Gillic: All-Ireland SFC-winner (1987, 1988)
- Ollie Murphy: All-Ireland SFC-winner (1996, 1999)

| Preceded by St Peter's Dunboyne | Meath Intermediate Football Champions; 1993 | Succeeded by Kilmainhamwood |
