= Slane GFC =

Gaelic sports club in County Meath, Ireland

Slane
- Baile Shlaine
- Founded: 1887
- County: Meath
- Colours
- Grounds: Slane GAA Club

Playing kits
Standard colours

Senior Club Championships
	All Ireland	Leinster champions	Meath champions
Football:	0	0	0

Slane GFC is a Gaelic Athletic Association club based in the village of Slane, County Meath, Ireland. The club is affiliated to the Meath County Board and fields teams primarily in Gaelic football.

== History ==
Located in the villages of Slane and Monknewtown, approximately 13km from Navan, Slane GFC was founed in 1887.

Slane have won three Meath IFC titles each in 1929, 1968 and 1984. They also competed in two other IFC finals in 1955 and 1961, but lost both of those matches. Slane have also won the Meath JFC twice, each in 1918 and 1952. Slane was be relegated to the Meath JBFC and after losing the final in 2022, they gained promotion back to the Meath JFC in 2023 against Moynalty. As of 2026, Slane compete in the Meath JFC.

Slane also support a ladies football team.

== Honours ==
- Meath Intermediate Football Championship (3): 1929, 1968, 1984 (runners-up in 1955, 1961)
- Meath Junior 'A' Football Championship (2): 1918, 1952
- Meath Junior 'B' Football Championship (1): 2023 (runners-up in 2022)

Preceded by Moynalvey	Meath Intermediate Football Champions; 1984	Succeeded by Martry Harps
