= St Michael's GAA (Meath) =

Gaelic sports club in County Meath, Ireland

St Michael's
- Naomh Mícheal
- Founded: 1980
- County: Meath
- Colours
- Grounds: St Michael's GAA Club

Playing kits
Standard colours

Senior Club Championships
	All Ireland	Leinster champions	Meath champions
Football:	0	0	0

St Michael's GAA is a Gaelic Athletic Association club in Carlanstown, County Meath, Ireland. The club is affiliated to the Meath County Board and fields teams primarily in Gaelic football.

== History ==
Located in the village of Carlanstown, approximately 5km from Kells, St Michael's GAA was founded in 1980. The club also takes up people from Kilbeg. St Michael's formed when Carlanstown GAA and Kilbeg GAA merged into one team.

St Michael's won the Meath JFC in 1982 against Seneschalstown B 2-06 to 1-07. In 1989 St Michael's won their only Meath IFC title against Dunderry 0-11 to 0-09. St Michael's would stay in the Meath SFC until they applied to be relegated in 1998 after a poor run of results. St Michael's was then relegated to the Meath JFC in 2000 after finishing bottom of their group.

In 2005 St Michael's returned to the Meath IFC after defeating Navan O'Mahonys B 2-11 to 1-11. St Michael's played Curraha in the Meath IFC final in 2017, losing 1-07 to 1-17. As of 2026, St Michael's compete in the Meath IFC.

== Honours ==
=== St Michael's ===
- Meath Intermediate Football Championship (1): 1989 (runners-up in 2017)
- Meath Junior 'A' Football Championship (2): 1982, 2005 (runners-up in 1981)

=== Carlanstown ===
- Meath Intermediate Football Championship (1): 1945 (runners-up in 1942)

== Notable players ==
- Martin O'Connell: All-Ireland SFC-winner (1987, 1988, 1996)

Preceded by St Colmcille's	Meath Intermediate Football Champions; 1989	Succeeded by Dunderry
