= Ballinlough GAA =

Gaelic sports club in County Meath, Ireland

Ballinlough
- Baile an Locha
- Founded: 1938
- County: Meath
- Colours
- Grounds: Ballinlough GAA Club

Playing kits
Standard colours

Senior Club Championships
	All Ireland	Leinster champions	Meath champions
Football:	0	0	0

Ballinlough GAA is a Gaelic Athletic Association club in Ballinlough, County Meath, Ireland. The club is affiliated to the Meath County Board and fields teams primarily in Gaelic football.

== History ==
Located in the village of Ballinlough, around 12 km from Kells, Ballinlough GAA was founded in 1938. Ballinlough have never won the Meath SFC, though have competed in one final in 1962 where they were defeated by Trim. Ballinlough have won 3 Meath IFC titles, each in 1954, 1991, and 2014. Following their win in the 2014 Meath IFC, Ballinlough made it to the Leinster Intermediate Club Football Championship final, losing to Seán O'Mahonys of Louth 0–10 to 1-04. Ballinlough have been in 3 Meath JFC finals, making it to one a year after they were founded in 1939. As of 2026, Ballinlough compete in the Meath JFC.

== Honours ==
- Meath Senior Football Championship (0): (runners-up in 1962)
- Meath Intermediate Football Championship (3): 1954, 1991, 2014 (runners-up in 2018)
- Meath Junior 'A' Football Championship (1): 1998 (runners-up in 1939, 2026)
- Leinster Intermediate Club Football Championship (0): (runners-up in 2014)

== Notable players ==
- Peadar Byrne: Leinster SFC-winner (2010)

Preceded by Gaeil Colmcille	Meath Intermediate Football Champions; 2014	Succeeded by Ratoath
