= Kilmainhamwood GFC =

Gaelic sports club in County Meath, Ireland

Kilmainhamwood
- Coill Chille Maighneann
- Founded: 1936
- County: Meath
- Colours
- Grounds: Kilmainhamwood GAA Club

Playing kits
Standard colours

Senior Club Championships
	All Ireland	Leinster champions	Meath champions
Football:	0	0	1

Kilmainhamwood GFC is a Gaelic Athletic Association club in Kilmainhamwood, County Meath, Ireland. The club is affiliated to the Meath County Board and fields teams primarily in Gaelic football. Founded in 1936, Kilmainhamwood have contested the Meath Senior Football Championship final three times, winning their only one in 1996. The club won the Meath Intermediate Football Championship three times in 1965, 1982 and 1994. As of 2026, Kilmainhamwood are competing in the Meath Junior Football Championship.

== Honours ==
- Meath Senior Football Championship (1): 1996 (runners-up in 1995 & 2000)
- Meath Intermediate Football Championship (3): 1965, 1982, 1994 (runners-up in 1964, 1976, 1978, 1993, 2009)
- Meath Junior 'B' Football Championship (1): 2026
- Feis Cup (1): 1997

== Notable Players ==
- Seán McCormack: All-Ireland SFC-winner (1967)
- Brian Stafford: All-Ireland SFC-winner (1987, 1988)

Preceded by Dunderry	Meath Senior Football Champions; 1996	Succeeded by Navan O'Mahonys
