= Billie Rattigan =

Irish Gaelic footballer (1931–2019)

Personal information
- Native name: Liam Ó Reachtagáin (Irish)
- Born: 1931 Drumree, County Meath, Ireland
- Died: 14 December 2019 (aged 88) Blanchardstown, Dublin, Ireland
- Occupation: Gardener
- Height: 5 ft 8 in (173 cm)

Sport
- Sport: Gaelic football
- Position: Left wing-forward
Clubs
- Years: Club
- Dunshaughlin; Drumree
Club titles
- Meath titles: 0
Inter-county
- Years: County
- Meath
Inter-county titles
- Leinster titles: 1
- All-Irelands: 1
- NFL: 0

William Rattigan (1931 – 14 December 2019) was an Irish Gaelic footballer who played for club sides Dunshaughlin and Drumree and at inter-county level for the Meath county team.

== Career ==
Rattigan began his football career with the Dunshaughlin club in the early 1950s. He became the first secretary of the Drumree club when it was re-formed in 1957 and was a key member of the team which won the junior championship in 1959. Rattigan was captain when Drumree won the intermediate championship in 1961 and was also involved in the intermediate championship win in 1969.

At inter-county level, Rattigan won a Leinster Championship medal in 1954 after lining out at left wing-forward in the final against Offaly. He later won an All-Ireland medal as a non-playing substitute following the 1–13 to 1–07 defeat of Kerry.

== Honours ==
Drumree

- Meath Intermediate Football Championship (2): 1961 (c), 1969
- Meath Junior Football Championship (1): 1959

Meath

- All-Ireland Senior Football Championship (1): 1954
- Leinster Senior Football Championship (1): 1954
