= 2011 Meath Intermediate Football Championship =

Meath I.F.C.
- Season: 2011
- Promoted: Moynalvey
- Relegated: Cortown
- Leinster ICFC: Moynalvey (preliminary round) Ó'Raghallaighs 0-14 Moynalvey 0-8
- All Ireland ICFC: N/A
- Matches: 35

The 2011 Meath Intermediate Football Championship was the 85th edition of the Meath GAA's premier club Gaelic football tournament for intermediate graded teams in County Meath, Ireland. The tournament consisted of 15 teams, with the winner going on to represent Meath in the Leinster Intermediate Club Football Championship. The championship started with a group stage and then progressed to a knock out stage.

This was St. Ultan's first year in the grade since 2008. They were relegated after 2 years as a senior club.

On 25 September 2011, Moynalvey claimed their second Intermediate championship title when they defeated Gaeil Colmcille 0-15 to 1-10, succeeding Nobber as Intermediate champions.

Cortown were relegated from this grade in 2011, after 5 years as an Intermediate club.

== Team changes ==
The following teams changed division since the 2010 championship season.

=== From I.F.C. ===
Promoted to S.F.C.

- Nobber - (Intermediate Champions)

Relegated to 2011 J.A.F.C.

- Kilmainhamwood

=== To I.F.C. ===
Relegted from S.F.C.

- St. Ultan's

Promoted from 2010 J.A.F.C.

- Ballinabrackey - (Junior 'A' Champions)

== Participating teams ==
The teams which took part in the 2011 Meath Intermediate Football Championship included:

| Club | Location | 2010 Championship Position | 2011 Championship Position |
|---|---|---|---|
| Ballinabrackey | Ballinabrackey | Junior Champions | Non Qualifier |
| Ballinlough | Ballinlough | Non Qualifier | Semi-finalist |
| Carnaross | Carnaross | Finalist | Non Qualifier |
| Castletown | Castletown | Relegation Play Off | Non Qualifier |
| Clann na nGael | Athboy | Relegation Play Off | Quarter-finalist |
| Cortown | Bohermeen | Non Qualifier | Relegated |
| Dunderry | Dunderry | Semi-finalist | Semi-finalist |
| Gaeil Colmcille | Kells | Quarter-finalist | Finalists |
| Longwood | Longwood | Quarter-finalist | Non Qualifier |
| Moynalvey | Moynalvey | Non Qualifier | Champions |
| Na Fianna | Enfield | Non Qualifier | Quarter-finalist |
| St Colmcilles | Laytown | Non Qualifier | Non Qualifier |
| St Michaels | Carlanstown | Semi-finalist | Relegation Play Off |
| St Ultans | Bohermeen | Relegated from Senior | Relegation Play Off |
| Syddan | Lobinstown | Non Qualifier | Non Qualifier |

== Group stage ==
In the group stage there are three groups called Group A, B and C. The top two teams from each group go through to the knock-out stages of the tournament and the teams that finish last in the three groups will play in the relegation playoff.

=== Group A ===
| Team | Pld | W | L | D | PF | PA | PD | Pts |
|---|---|---|---|---|---|---|---|---|
| Moynalvey | 4 | 4 | 0 | 0 | 62 | 46 | +16 | 8 |
| Clann na nGael | 4 | 3 | 1 | 0 | 60 | 58 | +2 | 6 |
| Castletown | 4 | 2 | 2 | 0 | 53 | 41 | +12 | 4 |
| St Colmcilles | 4 | 0 | 3 | 1 | 48 | 61 | -13 | 1 |
| St Ultans | 4 | 0 | 3 | 1 | 52 | 69 | -17 | 1 |

Round 1:

- Clann na nGael 0-12, 1-8 Castletown, Kilmainham, 17/4/2011,
- Moynalvey 1-10, 1-8 St Colmcilles, Seneschaltown, 17/4/2011,
- St. Ultan's - Bye,

Round 2:

- St Ultans 0-16, 3-7 St Colmcilles, Slane, 30/4/2011,
- Moynalvey 2-7, 1-9 Castletown, Walterstown, 1/5/2011,
- Clann na nGael - Bye,

Round 3:

- St Ultans 2-11, 3-11 Clann na nGael, Trim, 15/5/2011,
- Castletown 1-12, 0-9 St Colmcilles, Duleek, 15/5/2011,
- Moynalvey - Bye,

Round 4:

- St Ultans 0-12, 2-12 Moynalvey, Walterstown, 9/6/2011,
- Clann na nGael 3-8, 0-12 St Colmcilles, Rathkenny, 11/6/2011,
- Castletown - Bye,

Round 5:

- St Ultans 0-7, 0-15 Castletown, Kells, 7/8/2011,
- Clann na nGael 1-8, 3-9 Moynalvey, Trim, 7/8/2011,
- St. Colmcille's - Bye,

=== Group B ===
| Team | Pld | W | L | D | PF | PA | PD | Pts |
|---|---|---|---|---|---|---|---|---|
| Gaeil Colmcille | 4 | 3 | 1 | 0 | 56 | 43 | +13 | 6 |
| Dunderry | 4 | 3 | 1 | 0 | 51 | 44 | +7 | 6 |
| Syddan | 4 | 2 | 1 | 1 | 48 | 43 | +5 | 5 |
| Carnaross | 4 | 1 | 2 | 1 | 58 | 59 | -1 | 3 |
| St Michaels | 4 | 0 | 4 | 0 | 41 | 65 | -25 | 0 |

Round 1:

- Dunderry 0-10, 1-11 Gaeil Colmcille, Bohermeen, 16/4/2011,
- Syddan 2-10, 2-10 Carnaross, Moynalty, 17/4/2011,
- St. Michael's - Bye,

Round 2:

- St Michaels 1-10, 1-15 Carnaross, Kells, 30/4/2011,
- Syddan 0-9, 1-4 Gaeil Colmcille, Carlanstown, 1/5/2011,
- Dunderry - Bye,

Round 3:

- Dunderry 2-9, 0-9 St Michaels, Kilskyre, 14/5/2011,
- Carnaross 3-4, 2-10 Gaeil Colmcille, Moynalty, 15/5/2011,
- Syddan - Bye,

Round 4:

- St Michaels 0-8, 1-10 Syddan, Drumconrath, 10/6/2011,
- Dunderry 0-14, 1-8 Carnaross, Pairc Tailteann, 11/6/2011,
- Gaeil Colmcille - Bye,

Round 5:

- St Michaels 1-8, 0-19 Gaeil Colmcille, Kilmainham, 6/8/2011,
- Dunderry 0-12, 1-7 Syddan, Pairc Tailteann, 6/8/2011,
- Carnaross - Bye,

=== Group C ===
| Team | Pld | W | L | D | PF | PA | PD | Pts |
|---|---|---|---|---|---|---|---|---|
| Na Fianna | 4 | 4 | 0 | 0 | 59 | 42 | +17 | 8 |
| Ballinlough | 4 | 3 | 1 | 0 | 42 | 27 | +15 | 6 |
| Ballinabrackey | 4 | 2 | 2 | 0 | 42 | 37 | +5 | 4 |
| Longwood | 4 | 1 | 3 | 0 | 37 | 49 | -12 | 2 |
| Cortown | 4 | 0 | 4 | 0 | 29 | 54 | -25 | 0 |

Round 1:

- Ballinabrackey 1-12, 1-5 Cortown, Trim, 16/4/2011,
- Na Fianna 2-10, 1-10 Ballinlough, Athboy, 16/4/2011,
- Longwood - Bye,

Round 2:

- Longwood 0-4, 0-11 Ballinlough, Trim, 1/5/2011,
- Na Fianna 2-14, 1-6 Cortown, Boardsmill, 1/5/2011,
- Ballinabrackey - Bye,

Round 3:

- Longwood 0-10, 2-8 Ballinabrackey, Summerhill, 14/5/2011,
- Cortown 0-2, 0-8 Ballinlough, Carnaross, 14/5/2011,
- Na Fianna - Bye,

Round 4:

- Longwood 1-9, 0-14 Na Fianna, Trim, 12/6/2011,
- Ballinabrackey 0-5, 0-10 Ballinlough, Athboy, 12/6/2011,
- Cortown - Bye,

Round 5:

- Na Fianna 1-6 , 0-8 Ballinabrackey, Longwood, 5/8/2011,
- Longwood 0-11, 0-10 Cortown, Athboy, 7/8/2011,
- Ballinlough - Bye,

== Knock-out stages ==
=== Relegation play-off ===
| Team | Pld | W | L | D | PF | PA | PD | Pts |
|---|---|---|---|---|---|---|---|---|
| St Michaels | 2 | 2 | 0 | 0 | 27 | 19 | +8 | 4 |
| St Ultans | 2 | 1 | 1 | 0 | 24 | 22 | +2 | 2 |
| Cortown | 2 | 0 | 2 | 0 | 17 | 27 | -10 | 0 |

Game 1: St Ultans 0-11, 1-10 St Michaels, Kells, 21/8/2011,

Game 2: St Ultans 1-10, 0-9 Cortown, Kilmainham, 27/8/2011,

Game 3: Cortown 1-5, 0-14 St Michaels, Simonstown, 9/9/2011,

=== Finals ===
Quarter-finals
Na Fianna | 0-12
Dunderry | 2-9
Ballinlough | 3-7
Clann na nGael | 1-3

Semi-finals
Moynalvey | 3-5
Dunderry | 1-5
Gaeil Colmcille | 0-10
Ballinlough | 0-9

Final
Moynalvey | 0-15
Gaeil Colmcille | 1-10

Quarter-finals

- Na Fianna 0-12, 2-9 Dunderry, Kildalkey, 20/8/2011,
- Ballinlough 3-7, 1-3 Clann na nGael, Kells, 21/8/2011,

Semi-final

- Moynalvey 3-5, 1-5 Dunderry, Pairc Tailteann, 10/9/2011,
- Gaeil Colmcille 0-10, 0-9 Ballinlough, Pairc Tailteann, 10/9/2011,

Final

- Moynalvey 0-15, 1-10 Gaeil Colmcille, Pairc Tailteann, 25/9/2011,
