= Bective GFC =

Gaelic sports club in County Meath, Ireland

Bective
- Beag Teach
- Founded: 1964
- County: Meath
- Colours
- Grounds: Bective GFC Club

Playing kits
Standard colours

Senior Club Championships
	All Ireland	Leinster champions	Meath champions
Football:	0	0	0

Bective Gaelic Football Club is a Gaelic Athletic Association club in Bective, County Meath, Ireland. The club is affiliated to the Meath County Board and fields teams primarily in Gaelic football.

== History ==
Located in the village of Bective, approximately 9km from Navan, Bective GFC was founded in 1964. It is the third club within the Navan parish, along with Navan O'Mahonys and Simonstown Gaels. Bective have won two Meath JFC's, one in 1997 and the other in 2016. In 1997 they defeated Skryne B 0-11 to 0-09, and in 1997 they defeated Dunsany 0-15 to 0-12 to gain promotion to the Meath IFC. As of 2026, Bective remain in the Meath IFC after winning the relegation final against Drumbaragh Emmets 2-13 to 1-06.

== Honours ==
- Meath Junior 'A' Football Championship (2): 1997, 2016

== Notable Players ==
- Shane O'Rourke: Leinster SFC-winner (2010)

Preceded by Curraha	Meath Junior Football Champions; 2016	Succeeded by Meath Hill
