= 1991 Meath Intermediate Football Championship =

Meath I.F.C.
- Season: 1991
- Champions: Ballinlough; 2nd Intermediate Football Championship title
- Relegated: Bellewstown
- Matches: ??

The 1991 Meath Intermediate Football Championship is the 65th edition of the Meath GAA's premier club Gaelic football tournament for intermediate graded teams in County Meath, Ireland. The tournament consists of 20 teams. The championship starts with a group stage and then progresses to a knock out stage.

This year marked the first year of St. Ultan's existence since the formation of Intermediate club Martry Harps and Junior A club Bohermeen in January 1991.

This was Simonstown Gaels' first appearance in the grade as they were promoted from the J.F.C. after claiming the 1990 Meath Junior Football Championship title, and they made it to the quarter-final, losing to eventual champions Ballinlough.

On 10 November 1991, Ballinlough claimed their 2nd Intermediate championship title when they defeated St. Patrick's 1–9 to 0–11 in the final at Pairc Tailteann.

Bellewstown were regraded to the J.F.C. for 1992 after over 5 years as an Intermediate club.

== Team changes ==
The following teams have changed division since the 1990 championship season.

=== From I.F.C. ===
Promoted to S.F.C.

- Dunderry - (Intermediate Champions)

Relegated to 1991 J.A.F.C.

- Wolfe Tones

=== To I.F.C. ===
Regraded from S.F.C.

- None

Promoted from 1990 J.A.F.C.

- Simonstown Gaels - (Junior 'A' Champions)

== Group stage ==
There are 4 groups called Group A, B, C and D. The top two finishers in all groups will qualify for the quarter-finals.

=== Group A ===
Team	Pld	W	L	D	PF	PA	PD	Pts
St. Mary's Donore	4	3	0	1	26**	16**	+10**	7
St. Peter's Dunboyne	4	3	0	1	50*	18*	+32*	7
Dunshaughlin	4	2	2	0	34*	27*	+7*	4
Athboy	4	1	3	0	10***	14***	-4***	2
Moynalty	4	0	4	0	20*	65*	-45*	0

Round 1:

- St. Peter's Dunboyne 0–7, 0-7 St. Mary's, 7/4/1991,
- Dunshaughlin 1-12, 0-5 Moynalty, 7/4/1991,
- Athboy - Bye,

Round 2:

- St. Mary's w, l Dunshaughlin,
- Athboy w, l Moynalty,
- St. Peter's Dunboyne - Bye,

Round 3:

- St. Mary's 1-16, 1-6 Moynalty, 19/5/1991,
- St. Peter's Dunboyne w, l Athboy,
- Dunshaughlin - Bye,

Round 4:

- Dunshaughlin 2-8, 1-7 Athboy, 16/6/1991,
- St. Peter's Dunboyne 5-16, 1-3 Moynalty, 4/8/1991,
- St. Mary's - Bye

Round 5:

- St. Peter's Dunboyne 0-12, 0-5 Dunshaughlin, 29/9/1991,
- St. Mary's w, l Athboy,
- Moynalty - Bye,

=== Group B ===
Team	Pld	W	L	D	PF	PA	PD	Pts
St. Patrick's	4	4	0	0	57	30	+27	8
Simonstown Gaels	4	2	1	1	30*	35*	-5*	5
St. Ultan's	4	2	2	0	22**	20**	+12**	4
Navan O'Mahonys 'B'	4	1	2	1	27*	42*	-15*	3
Rathkenny	4	0	4	0	16**	24**	-8**	0

Round 1:

- St. Patrick's 2-5, 0-4 Rathkenny, 7/4/1991,
- St. Ultan's 2-8, 1-8 Navan O'Mahonys 'B', 5/5/1991,
- Simonstown Gaels - Bye,

Round 2:

- St. Patrick's 3-7, 0-9 Simonstown Gaels, 5/5/1991,
- St. Ultan's w, l Rathkenny,
- Navan O'Mahonys 'B' - Bye,

Round 3:

- Simonstown Gaels w, l St. Ultan's,
- Navan O'Mahonys 'B' w, l Rathkenny,
- St. Patrick's - Bye,

Round 4:

- Simonstown Gaels 1-11, 0-12 Rathkenny, 22/9/1991,
- St. Patrick's 3-12, 1-6 Navan O'Mahonys 'B', 29/9/1991,
- St. Ultan's - Bye,

Round 5:

- Simonstown Gaels 0–7, 0-7 Navan O'Mahonys 'B', 6/10/1991,
- St. Patrick's 1-6, 0-8 St. Ultan's, 13/10/1991,
- Rathkenny - Bye,

=== Group C ===
Team	Pld	W	L	D	PF	PA	PD	Pts
Dunsany	4	4	0	0	44*	30*	+14*	8
Kilmainhamwood	4	3	1	0	55	40	+15	6
Syddan	4	2	2	0	22**	29**	-7**	4
Donaghmore	4	1	3	0	10***	21***	-11***	2
Meath Hill	4	0	4	0	19**	30**	-11**	0

Round 1:

- Kilmainhamwood 1-10, 1-9 Meath Hill, 7/4/1991,
- Syddan w, l Donaghmore,
- Dunsany - Bye,

Round 2:

- Dunsany 0-10, 2-3 Kilmainhamwood, 28/4/1991,
- Syddan w, l Meath Hill,
- Donaghmore - Bye,

Round 3:

- Dunsany 1-14, 2-8 Syddan, 19/5/1991,
- Donaghmore w, l Meath Hill,
- Kilmainhamwood - Bye,

Round 4:

- Dunsany 2-11, 0-7 Meath Hill, 18/8/1991,
- Kilmainhamwood 3-12, 0-10 Donaghmore, 22/9/1991,
- Syddan - Bye,

Round 5:

- Dunsany w, l Donaghmore,
- Kilmainhamwood 1-9, 0-8 Syddan,
- Meath Hill - Bye,

=== Group D ===
Team	Pld	W	L	D	PF	PA	PD	Pts
Ballinlough	3	3	0	0	0	0	+0	6
Ballivor	3	1	1	1	0	0	+0	3
Ballinabrackey	3	1	1	1	0	0	+0	3
Bellewstown	3	0	3	0	0	0	+0	0

Round 1:

- Ballinlough 3-9, 1-9 Ballinabrackey, 7/4/1991,
- Ballivor w, l Bellewstown,

Round 2:

- Ballinlough w, l Ballivor,
- Ballinabrackey w, l Bellewstown,

Round 3:

- Ballivor 1–8, 1-8 Ballinabrackey,
- Ballinlough w, l Bellewstown,

Quarter-final Playoff:

- Ballivor 1-14, 2-7 Ballinabrackey, 25/8/1991,

== Knock-out Stages ==
=== Finals ===
The teams in the quarter-finals are the top two finishers from each group.

Quarter-Finals
St. Mary's	2-7
Kilmainhamwood	1-8
St. Patrick's	3-8
Ballivor	1-5
Dunsany	0-6
St. Peter's Dunboyne	2-12
Ballinlough	1-9
Simonstown Gaels	0-9

Semi-Finals
St. Mary's	0-11
St. Patrick's	2-8
St. Peter's Dunboyne	2-10
Ballinlough	2-11

Final
St. Patrick's	0-11
Ballinlough	1-9

Quarter-final:

- St. Mary's 2-7, 1-8 Kilmainhamwood, 6/10/1991,
- St. Peter's Dunboyne 2-12, 0-6 Dunsany, 6/10/1991,
- Ballinlough 1-9, 0-9 Simonstown Gaels, 20/10/1991,
- St. Patrick's 3-8, 1-5 Ballivor, 20/10/1991,

Semi-final:

- Ballinlough 2-11, 2-10 St. Peter's Dunboyne, 27/10/1991,
- St. Patrick's 2-8, 0-11 St. Mary's, 27/10/1991,

Final:

- Ballinlough 1-9, 0-11 St. Patrick's, 10/11/1991,
