= Castletown GAA (Meath) =

Gaelic sports club in County Meath, Ireland

Castletown
- Baile an Chaisleáin
- Founded: 1896
- County: Meath
- Colours
- Grounds: Castletown GAA Club

Playing kits
Standard colours

Senior Club Championships
	All Ireland	Leinster champions	Meath champions
Football:	0	0	5

Castletown GAA is a Gaelic Athletic Association club in Castletown-Kilpatrick, County Meath, Ireland. The club is affiliated to the Meath County Board and fields teams primarily in Gaelic football.

== History ==
Located in Castletown-Kilpatrick approximately 16 km from Navan, Castletown GAA was founded in 1896. Castletown have won 5 Meath SFC titles, all in the duration of seven years from 1902 to 1908. Despite their success, Castletown haven't played in the Meath SFC since 1991. Castletown were the first team to win the Meath IFC, and have 3 Meath IFC titles. Since being relegated in 1991 from the senior ranks Castletown have contested 3 Intermediate finals, losing all of them. Castletown's last title came in 2022 when they beat Dunsany in the Meath JFC final 1–12 to 0–11. Castletown went on to win the Leinster Junior Club Football Championship against St Abban's, Adamstown of Wexford 0–12 to 0-06. They were beaten by Fossa in the All-Ireland Junior Club Football Championship semi-final.

== Roll of Honour ==
- Meath Senior Football Championship (5): 1902, 1904, 1905, 1906, 1908 (runners-up in 1903, 1933)
- Meath Intermediate Football Championship (3): 1927, 1946, 1976 (runners-up in 1969, 1995, 2007, 2025)
- Meath Junior 'A' Football Championship (1): 2022 (runners-up in 1943, 1957)
- Leinster Junior Club Football Championship (1): 2022

Preceded by Navan Gaels	Meath Senior Football Champions; 1908	Succeeded by Bohermeen
