= Moylagh GAA =

Gaelic football club in County Meath, Ireland

Moylagh
- Moylagh
- Founded: 1947
- County: Meath
- Colours
- Grounds: Moylagh Community Centre

Playing kits
Standard colours

Senior Club Championships
| | All Ireland | Leinster champions | Meath champions |
|---|---|---|---|
| Football: | 0 | 0 | 0 |

Moylagh GAA is a Gaelic Athletic Association club in Moylagh, County Meath, Ireland. The club is affiliated to the Meath County Board and fields teams primarily in Gaelic football and hurling.

== History ==
Located in the parish of Moylagh, Moylagh GAA was founded in 1947. Moylagh amalgamated with Oldcastle in 1957 into a club called Millbrook, but was reformed in 1962.

In Gaelic football, Moylagh have only won 1 county title, when they defeated Dunshaughlin in the 1975 Meath IFC. Moylagh have also contested 3 Meath JFC finals, but have lost all three of them.

In hurling, Moylagh amalgamated with Kilskyre GAA to form Kilskyre/Moylagh at the senior level in 2016. They won the Meath Senior B Hurling Championship in 2026.

In ladies Gaelic football, Moylagh have won 1 Meath Ladies IFC title in 2002, when they defeated Blackhall Gaels 2–09 to 0-06.

== Honours ==
=== Gaelic Football ===
- Meath Intermediate Football Championship (1): 1975 (runners-up in 1973)
- Meath Junior 'A' Football Championship (0): (runners-up in 1999, 2017, 2019)

=== Hurling - Kilskyre/Moylagh ===
- Meath Senior B Hurling Championship (1): 2026
- Meath Intermediate A Hurling Championship (1): 2025

=== Ladies Gaelic Football ===
- Meath Ladies Intermediate Football Championship (1): 2002 (runners-up in 2001, 2005)
- Meath Ladies Junior Football Championship (0): (runners-up in 1998, 2018)

| Preceded by St John's | Meath Intermediate Football Champions; 1975 | Succeeded by Castletown |
