= 1991 Meath Senior Football Championship =

Meath S.F.C.
- Season: 1991
- Champions: Gaeil Colmcille; 15th Senior Championship Title
- Relegated: Castletown; Nobber
- Leinster SCFC: Gaeil Colmcille (Quarter-Final) Baltinglass 0-9, 0-8 Gaeil Colmcille
- All Ireland SCFC: n/a
- Winning Captain: Terry Ferguson (Gaeil Colmcille)
- Man of the Match: Eugene McGillick (Gaeil Colmcille)

The 1991 Meath Senior Football Championship is the 99th edition of the Meath GAA's premier club Gaelic football tournament for senior graded teams in County Meath, Ireland. The tournament consists of 15 teams, with the winner going on to represent Meath in the Leinster Senior Club Football Championship. The championship starts with a group stage and then progresses to a knock out stage.

This was Dunderry's return to the grade after claiming the 1990 Meath Intermediate Football Championship title.

Navan O'Mahonys were the defending champions after they defeated Summerhill after a replay in the previous years final, however their quest for five titles in a row was ended by Walterstown at the semi-final stage.

Gaeil Colmcille claimed their 1st S.F.C. title (since being formed from the Kilmainham, Drumnbaragh and Kells Harps clubs in 1966) when beating Walterstown 1–12 to 1-6 after a replay in the final at Pairc Tailteann on 3 November 1991. Terry Ferguson raised the Keegan Cup for Gaeil Colmcille while Eugene McGillick claimed the 'Man of the Match' award.

Nobber were regraded from the S.F.C. after 11 years as a senior club, which included three semi-final appearances. Castletown were also regraded after 15 years in the top-flight.

== Team changes ==
The following teams have changed division since the 1990 championship season.

=== To S.F.C. ===
Promoted from I.F.C.

- Dunderry - (Intermediate Champions)

=== From S.F.C. ===
Regraded to I.F.C.

- None

== Group stage ==
=== Group A ===
Team	Pld	W	L	D	PF	PA	PD	Pts
Walterstown	4	4	0	0	27**	9**	+18**	8
Summerhill	4	3	1	0	22**	14**	+8**	6
Moynalvey	4	2	2	0	35*	29*	+6*	4
Trim	4	1	3	0	27*	35*	-8*	2
Castletown	4	0	4	0	9**	33**	-24**	0

Round 1

- Walterstown w, l Moynalvey,
- Summerhill 0-11, 1-6 Trim, 7/4/1991,
- Castletown - Bye,

Round 2

- Trim w, l Castletown,
- Walterstown w, l Summerhill,
- Moynalvey - Bye,

Round 3

- Moynalvey 2-10, 0-6 Castletown, 19/5/1991,
- Walterstown 1-7, 0-6 Trim, 22/9/1991,
- Summerhill - Bye,

Round 4

- Moynalvey 1-11, 1-9 Trim, 29/9/1991,
- Summerhill w, l Castletown,
- Walterstown - Bye,

Round 5

- Walterstown 1-14, 0-3 Castletown, 29/9/1991,
- Summerhill 0-11, 0-5 Moynalvey, 6/10/1991,
- Trim - Bye,

=== Group B ===
Team	Pld	W	L	D	PF	PA	PD	Pts
Gaeil Colmcille	4	4	0	0	28**	21**	+7**	8
Navan O'Mahonys	4	2	1	1	26**	27**	-1**	5
Skryne	4	2	1	1	34	33	+1	5
Slane	4	1	3	0	16**	21**	-5**	2
St. Michael's	4	0	4	0	8**	10**	-2**	0

Round 1

- Gaeil Colmcille 2-8, 1-5 Skryne, 7/4/1991,
- Slane 1-7, 0-8 St. Michael's, 7/4/1991,
- Navan O'Mahonys - Bye,

Round 2

- Navan O'Mahonys 1–10, 0-13 Skryne, 5/5/1991,
- Gaeil Colmcille w, l St. Michael's,
- Slane - Bye,

Round 3

- Navan O'Mahonys w, l St. Michael's,
- Gaeil Colmcille w, l Slane,
- Skryne - Bye,

Round 4

- Gaeil Colmcille 1-11, 2-7 Navan O'Mahonys, 29/9/1991,
- Skryne 2-7, 0-6 Slane, 29/9/1991,
- St. Michael's - Bye,

Round 5

- Navan O'Mahonys w, l Slane,
- Skryne w/o, scr St. Michael's,
- Gaeil Colmcille - Bye,

Quarter-final Playoff:

- Navan O'Mahonys 2-8, 1-4 Skryne, 6/10/1991,

=== Group C ===
Team	Pld	W	L	D	PF	PA	PD	Pts
Dunderry	4	3	0	1	65	34	+31	7
Seneschalstown	4	3	0	1	56*	19*	+37*	7
St. Colmcille's	4	2	2	0	13**	40**	-27**	4
Oldcastle	4	1	3	0	14**	41**	-27**	2
Nobber	4	0	4	0	8***	24***	-16***	0

Round 1

- Seneschalstown 2-13, 1-1 Oldcastle, 7/4/1991,
- Dunderry 3-13, 1-5 Nobber, 7/4/1991,
- St. Colmcille's - Bye,

Round 2

- St. Colmcille's 0-11, 1-6 Oldcastle, 14/4/1991,
- Seneschalstown w, l Nobber,
- Dunderry - Bye,

Round 3

- Seneschalstown 0–9, 0-9 Dunderry, 19/5/1991,
- St. Colmcille's 1-8, 1-6 Nobber, Rathkenny, 12/5/1991,
- Oldcastle - Bye,

Round 4

- Seneschalstown 3-19, 0-6 St. Colmcille's, 29/9/1991,
- Dunderry 3-13, 0-10 Oldcastle, 29/9/1991,
- Nobber - Bye,

Round 5

- Dunderry 2-6, 0-7 St. Colmcille's, 13/10/1991,
- Oldcastle w, l Nobber
- Seneschalstown - Bye,

== Knock-out Stages ==
The teams in the quarter-finals are the second placed teams from each group and the Group C winner. The teams in the semi-finals are Group A and B winners along with the quarter-final winners.

Quarter-Finals
Navan O'Mahonys	0-8
Dunderry	0-6
Seneschalstown	0-10
Summerhill	1-4

Semi-Finals
Walterstown	0-12
Navan O'Mahonys	0-7
Gaeil Colmcille	3-15
Seneschalstown	0-8

Final
Walterstown	1-6
Gaeil Colmcille	1-12

Quarter-finals:

- Seneschalstown 0-10, 1-4 Summerhill, 20/10/1991,
- Navan O'Mahonys 0-8, 0-6 Dunderry, 20/10/1991,

Semi-finals:

- Gaeil Colmcille 3-15, 0-8 Seneschalstown, 27/10/1991,
- Walterstown 0-12, 0-7 Navan O'Mahonys, 27/10/1991,

Final:

- Gaeil Colmcille 1-12, 1-6 Walterstown, Pairc Tailteann, 3/11/1991,

== Leinster Senior Club Football Championship ==
Quarter-final:

- Baltinglass 0-9, 0-8 Gaeil Colmcille, Aughrim, 17/11/1991,
