= 1984 Meath Intermediate Football Championship =

Meath I.F.C.
- Season: 1984
- Champions: Slane; 3rd Intermediate Football Championship title
- Relegated: Walterstown 'B'
- Matches: ??

The 1984 Meath Intermediate Football Championship is the 58th edition of the Meath GAA's premier club Gaelic football tournament for intermediate graded teams in County Meath, Ireland. The tournament consists of 17 teams. The championship starts with a group stage and then progresses to a knock out stage.

This was St. Colmcille's first year ever in this grade as they were promoted from the J.F.C. after claiming the 1983 Meath Junior Football Championship title. It was also just their 14th year in existence after the two clubs Stars of the Sea and Shallon amalgamated in 1971.

On 30 September 1984, Slane claimed their 3rd Intermediate championship title when they defeated St. Colmcille's 0–8 to 0–5 in the final at Pairc Tailteann.

Walterstown 'B' were relegated to the J.F.C.

== Team changes ==
The following teams have changed division since the 1983 championship season.

=== From I.F.C. ===
Promoted to S.F.C.

- Moynalvey - (Intermediate Champions)

Relegated to J.A.F.C.

- Grove Emmets
- Kilbride
- Kilcloon

=== To I.F.C. ===
Regraded from S.F.C.

- n/a

Promoted from J.A.F.C.

- St. Colmcille's - (Junior 'A' Champions)

== Group stage ==
There are 3 groups called Group A, B and C. The top finishers in Group A and B will qualify for the semi-finals. First place in Group C along with the runners-up in all the groups qualify for the quarter-finals.

=== Group A ===
Team	Pld	W	L	D	PF	PA	PD	Pts
St. Colmcille's	5	4	0	1	47*	40*	+7*	9
Duleek	5	3	1	1	24**	21**	+3**	7
St. Michael's	5	3	1	1	41*	38*	+3*	7
St. Mary's	5	2	2	1	50	38	+12	5
Dunshaughlin	5	1	4	0	6***	12***	-6***	2
Dunsany	5	0	5	0	26*	45*	-19*	0

Round 1:

- St. Colmcille's 0-11, 2-3 Duleek, 8/4/1984,
- St. Mary's 3-3, 0-6 Dunshaughlin, 8/4/1984,
- St. Michael's 1-7, 2-1 Dunsany, 8/4/1984,

Round 2:

- St. Colmcille's 2-9, 3-4 Dunsany, 29/4/1984,
- Duleek 0–4, 0-4 St. Mary's, 29/4/1984,
- St. Michael's w, l Dunshaughlin,

Round 3:

- St. Michael's 1-10, 1-5 St. Mary's, 1/7/1984,
- St. Colmcille's 1-7, 0-6 Dunshaughlin,
- Duleek w, l Dunsany,

Round 4:

- St. Colmcille's 0–12, 1-9 St. Michael's, 29/7/1984,
- St. Mary's 2-14, 1-3 Dunsany, 29/7/1984,
- Duleek w, l Dunshaughlin,

Round 5:

- St. Colmcille's 0-9, 1-3 St. Mary's, 19/8/1984,
- Duleek 1-8, 0-6 St. Michael's, 19/8/1984,
- Dunshaughlin w/o, scr Dunsany, 19/8/1984,

=== Group B ===
Team	Pld	W	L	D	PF	PA	PD	Pts
Slane	5	5	0	0	23**	15**	+8**	10
Martry Harps	5	4	1	0	23**	22**	+1**	8
Ratoath	5	3	2	0	0	0	+0	6
Oldcastle	5	2	3	0	22***	18***	+4***	4
Moylagh	5	1	4	0	10**	20**	-10**	2
Walterstown 'B'	5	0	5	0	0	0	+0	0

Round 1:

- Slane 0-8, 0-6 Moylagh, 8/4/1984,
- Martry Harps 1-11, 1-4 Oldcastle, 8/4/1984,
- Ratoath w, l Walterstown 'B',

Round 2:

- Oldcastle 1-12, 0-4 Moylagh, 29/4/1984,
- Slane w, l Ratoath,
- Martry Harps w, l Walterstown 'B',

Round 3:

- Slane 2-9, 1-6 Martry Harps, 1/7/1984,
- Ratoath w, l Moylagh,
- Oldcastle w, l Walterstown 'B',

Round 4:

- Slane w, l Oldcastle,
- Martry Harps w, l Ratoath,
- Moylagh w, l Walterstown 'B',

Round 5:

- Slane 1-9, 0-5 Walterstown 'B',
- Martry Harps 1-13, 0-7 Moylagh,
- Ratoath 2-14, 0-5 Oldcastle,

=== Group C ===
Team	Pld	W	L	D	PF	PA	PD	Pts
Meath Hill	4	4	0	0	19*	14*	+5*	8
Donaghmore	4	3	1	0	34*	24*	+10*	6
Wolfe Tones	4	2	2	0	9**	3**	+6**	4
Navan O'Mahonys 'B'	4	1	3	0	12*	22*	-10*	2
Dunderry	4	0	4	0	13*	24*	-11*	0

Round 1:

- Meath Hill 0-10, 0-7 Dunderry, 8/4/1984,
- Donaghmore w, l Wolfe Tones,
- Navan O'Mahonys 'B' - Bye,

Round 2:

- Donaghmore 0-14, 1-3 Dunderry, 29/4/1984,
- Wolfe Tones 0-9, 0-3 Navan O'Mahonys 'B', 29/4/1984,
- Meath Hill - Bye,

Round 3:

- Meath Hill 2-3, 0-7 Donaghmore, 10/6/1984,
- Navan O'Mahonys 'B' 3-14, 0-3 Dunderry,
- Wolfe Tones - Bye,

Round 4:

- Donaghmore 1-10, 1-6 Navan O'Mahonys 'B', 1/7/1984,
- Meath Hill w, l Wolfe Tones,
- Dunderry - Bye,

Round 5:

- Meath Hill w/o, scr Navan O'Mahonys 'B',
- Wolfe Tones w/o, scr Dunderry,
- Donaghmore - Bye,

== Knock-out Stages ==
=== Finals ===
The teams in the quarter-finals are the second placed teams from each group and the Group C winner. The teams in the semi-finals are Group A and B winners along with the quarter-final winners.

Quarter-Finals
Martry Harps	w
Donaghmore	l
Meath Hill	1-5
Duleek	0-9

Semi-Finals
St. Colmcille's	1-9
Martry Harps	1-6
Slane	0-7
Duleek	0-5

Final
St. Colmcille's	0-5
Slane	0-8

Quarter-final:

- Martry Harps w, l Donaghmore,
- Duleek 0-9, 1-5 Meath Hill,

Semi-final:

- Slane 0-7, 0-5 Duleek, Skryne, 9/9/1984,
- St. Colmcille's 1-9, 1-6 Martry Harps, Skryne, 9/9/1984,

Final:

- Slane 0-8, 0-5 St. Colmcille's, Pairc Tailteann, 30/9/1984,
