= 2009 Meath Intermediate Football Championship =

Meath I.F.C.
- Season: 2009
- Champions: Oldcastle; 2nd Intermediate Football Championship Titile
- Promoted: Oldcastle
- Relegated: Drumconrath
- Leinster ICFC: Oldcastle(quarter-final) Maynooth 1-7 Oldcastle 0-6
- All Ireland ICFC: N/A
- Matches: 38

The 2009 Meath Intermediate Football Championship is the 83rd edition of the Meath GAA's premier club Gaelic football tournament for intermediate graded teams in County Meath, Ireland. The tournament consists of 15 teams, with the winner going on to represent Meath in the Leinster Intermediate Club Football Championship. The championship starts with a group stage and then progresses to a knock out stage.

This was Kilmainhamwood's first year in this grade since 1994, after 14 years in the Senior grade since being relegated in 2008.

On 26 October 2009, Oldcastle claimed their 2nd Intermediate championship title when they defeated Kilmainhamwood 2-11 to 0-6, succeeding St. Ultan's as Intermediate champions.

Drumconrath were relegated from this grade, after 13 years as an Intermediate club.

== Team changes ==
The following teams have changed division since the 2008 championship season.

=== From I.F.C. ===
Promoted to S.F.C.

- St. Ultan's - (Intermediate Champions)

Relegated to J.A.F.C.

- Ballivor

=== To I.F.C. ===
Relegted from S.F.C.

- Kilmainhamwood

Promoted from J.A.F.C.

- Moynalvey - (Junior 'A' Champions)

== Group stage ==
In the group stage, there are three groups called Group A, B and C. Two teams from each group go through to finals of the tournament. The three teams that finish last in each group go to the relegation play off.

=== Group A ===
Team	Pld	W	L	D	PF	PA	PD	Pts
Dunderry	5	4	1	0	76	53	+23	8
Gaeil Colmcille	5	4	1	0	77	61	+16	8
St. Michaels	5	3	2	0	75	64	+11	6
Na Fianna	5	3	2	0	72	60	+12	6
Carnaross	5	1	4	0	53	75	-22	2
Drumconrath	5	0	5	0	50	90	-40	0

Round 1:

- St. Michael's 2-9, 0-6 Carnaross, Moynalty, 16/4/2009,
- Dunderry 1-18, 3-3 Drumconrath, Donore, 19/4/2009,
- Gaeil Colmcille 3-9, 2-11 Na Fianna, Boardsmill, 19/4/2009,

Round 2:

- Carnaross 1-13, 1-10 Drumconrath, Moynalty, 1/5/2009,
- Na Fianna 1-7, 0-8 Dunderry, Dunshaughlin, 3/5/2009
- Gaeil Colmcille 1-11, 0-11 St. Michael's, 3/5/2009,

Round 3:

- Na Fianna 2-12, 0-5 Drumconrath, Dunderry, 12/6/2009,
- Dunderry 0-16, 2-9 St. Michael's, Bohermeen, 13/6/2009,
- Gaeil Colmcille 1-14, 2-7 Carnaross, Ballinlough, 13/6/2009,

Round 4:

- St. Michael's 1-12, 1-10 Drumconrath, Meath Hill, 6/9/2009,
- Na Fianna 1-9, 0-10 Carnaross, Simonstown, 12/9/2009,
- Dunderry 0-13, 1-5 Gaeil Colmcille, Bohermeen, 13/9/2009,

Round 5:

- Gaeil Colmcille 3-11, 0-7 Drumconrath, Syddan, 19/9/2009,
- Dunderry 1-15, 0-8 Carnaross, Martry, 20/9/2009,
- St. Michael's 2-13, 2-9 Na Fianna, Athboy, 20/9/2009.

=== Group B ===
Team	Pld	W	L	D	PF	PA	PD	Pts
Kilmainhamwood	4	1	0	3	46	41	+5	5
Ballinlough	4	2	1	1	49	46	+3	5
Cortown	4	2	1	1	50	48	+2	5
Moynalvey	4	1	2	1	45	53	-8	3
Castletown	4	0	2	2	49	51	-2	2

Round 1:

- Kilmainhamwood 1-9, 1-9 Ballinlough, Carnaross, 19/4/2009,
- Cortown 1-11, 1-11 Castletown, Carlanstown, 19/4/2009,
- Moynalvey - Bye

Round 2:

- Kilmainhamwood 0-11, 0-6 Cortown, Castletown, 4/5/2009,
- Ballinlough 2-7, 1-7 Moynalvey, Athboy, 4/5/2009,
- Castletown - Bye

Round 3:

- Cortown 0-11, 0-10 Ballinlough, Kells, 13/6/2009,
- Moynalvey 1-8, 0-10 Castletown, Bective, 21/6/2009,
- Kilmainhamwood - Bye

Round 4:

- Ballinlough 2-8, 0-13 Castletown, Moynalty, 6/9/2009,
- Kilmainhamwood 2-5, 0-11 Moynalvey, Pairc Tailteann, 15/9/2009,
- Cortown - Bye

Round 5:

- Kilmainhamwood 1-9, 1-9 Castletown, Drumconrath, 19/9/2009,
- Cortown 2-13, 1-10 Moynalvey, Bective, 19/9/2009,
- Ballinlough - Bye

=== Group C ===
Team	Pld	W	L	D	PF	PA	PD	Pts
Oldcastle	4	3	1	0	55	44	+11	6
Nobber	4	3	1	0	52	45	+7	6
St. Colmcilles	4	2	2	0	52	52	+0	4
Syddan	4	1	3	0	46	58	-12	2
Clann na nGael	4	1	3	0	48	54	-6	2

Round 1:

- Nobber 1-10, 1-9 St. Colmcille's, Slane, 19/4/2009,
- Oldcastle 1-14, 1-8 Syddan, Athboy, 19/4/2013
- Clann na nGael - Bye,

Round 2:

- Nobber 1-8, 1-5 Syddan, Meath Hill, 1/5/2009,
- St. Colmcille's 1-10, 1-8 Clann na nGael, Dunsany, 2/5/2009,
- Oldcastle - Bye

Round 3:

- St. Colmcille's 1-16, 0-12 Syddan, Slane, 13/6/2009,
- Clann na nGael 2-8, 0-9 Oldcastle, Moynalty, 13/6/2009
- Nobber - Bye

Round 4:

- Oldcastle 2-10, 0-8 St. Colmcille's, Rathkenny, 12/9/2009,
- Nobber 2-11, 1-9 Clann na nGael, Carnaross, 17/9/2009,
- Syddan - Bye

Round 5:

- Oldcastle 0-13, 1-8 Nobber, Ballinlough, 24/9/2009,
- Syddan 2-9, 0-11 Clann na nGael, Moynalty,
- St. Colmcille's - Bye

== Knock Out Stage ==
=== Relegation Play Off ===
The teams that finished bottom of each group play in the relegation play off.

Team	Pld	W	L	D	PF	PA	PD	Pts
Clann na nGael	1	1	0	0	13	8	+5	2
Castletown	2	1	1	0	20	22	-2	2
Drumconrath	1	0	1	0	9	12	-3	0

Game 1: Clann na nGael 1-10 , 0-8 Castletown, Kilberry, 17/10/2009,

Relegation Final: Castletown 0-12, 2-3 Drumconrath, Pairc Tailteann, 24/10/2009,

=== Finals ===
The teams in the quarter-finals are the second placed teams from each group and one group winner. The teams in the semi-finals are two group winners and the quarter-final winners.

Preliminary Round
St. Colmcille's	1-10
Cortown	0-10

Quarter-finals
Dunderry	2-15
St. Colmcille's	1-6
Oldcastle AET	1-16
Ballinlough AET	1-10
Nobber	1-11
Gaeil Colmcille	2-7
Kilmainhamwood	1-10
St. Michael's	0-8

Semi-finals
Dunderry	0-11
Oldcastle	0-14
Nobber	0-15 R
Kilmainhamwood	1-15 R

Final
Oldcastle	2-11
Kilmainhamwood	0-6

Preliminary Quarter-final

- St. Colmcille's 1-10, 0-10 Cortown, Simonstown, 29/9/2009,

Quarter-final

- Kilmainhamwood 1-10, 0-8 St. Michael's, Carnaross, 3/10/2009,
- Nobber 1-11, 2-7 Gaeil Colmcille, Moynalty, 4/10/2009,
- Oldcastle 1-16, 2-8 Ballinlough, Pairc Tailteann, 4/10/2009, AET
- Dunderry 2-15, 1-6 St. Colmcille's, Seneschalstown, 4/10/2009,

Semi-final

- Kilmainhamwood 1-12, 0-15 Nobber, Pairc Tailteann, 10/10/2009, AET
- Oldcastle 0-14, 0-11 Dunderry, Pairc Tailteann, 10/10/2009,
- Kilmainhamwood 1-15, 0-15 Nobber, Pairc Tailteann, 18/10/2009,

Final

- Oldcastle 2-11, 0-6 Kilmainhamwood, Pairc Tailteann, 26/10/2009.

== Leinster Intermediate Club Football Championship ==
Quarter-final:

- Maynooth 1-7, 0-6 Oldcastle, Maynooth, 17/11/2016,
