= 2006 Meath Intermediate Football Championship =

Meath I.F.C.
- Season: 2006
- Champions: Rathkenny; 2nd Intermediate Football Championship title
- Relegated: Slane
- Leinster ICFC: Rathkenny (preliminary round), St. Martin's 1-7, 0-7 Rathkenny
- All Ireland ICFC: N/A

The 2006 Meath Intermediate Football Championship is the 80th edition of the Meath GAA's premier club Gaelic football tournament for intermediate graded teams in County Meath, Ireland. The tournament consists of 16 teams, with the winner going on to represent Meath in the Leinster Intermediate Club Football Championship. The championship starts with a group stage and then progresses to a knock out stage.

This was Dunderry's first year in this grade since 1990, after 15 years in the Senior grade since being relegated in 2005.

On 15 October 2006, Rathkenny claimed their 2nd Intermediate championship title when they defeated Drumconrath 1-10 to 2-6, succeeding Duleek as Intermediate champions.

Slane were relegated from this grade, after 7 years as an Intermediate club.

== Team changes ==
The following teams have changed division since the 2005 championship season.

=== From I.F.C. ===
Promoted to S.F.C.

- Duleek - (Intermediate Champions)

Relegated to J.A.F.C.

- Drumree

=== To I.F.C. ===
Relegted from S.F.C.

- Dunderry

Promoted from J.A.F.C.

- St. Michael's - (Junior 'A' Champions)

== Group stage ==
There are 2 groups called Group A and B. The 4 top finishers in Group A and B will qualify for the quarter-finals. The 2 teams that finish last in their groups will play in a relegation play off.

=== Group A ===
Team	Pld	W	L	D	PF	PA	PD	Pts
Castletown	7	6	1	0	94	63	+31	12
Donaghmore/Ashbourne	7	6	1	0	92	66	+26	12
Drumconrath	7	4	2	1	81	79	+2	9
Gaeil Comlcille	7	3	3	1	88	71	+17	7
Ballivor	7	2	3	2	73	78	-5	6
Dunderry	7	3	4	0	65	75	-10	6
Carnaross	7	1	6	0	69	106	-43	2
Na Fianna	7	1	6	0	83	101	-28	2

Round 1:

- Castletown 0-17, 0-4 Ballivor, Bohermeen,
- Donaghmore/Ashbourne 1-12, 2-5 Carnaross, Seneschalstown,
- Drumconrath 2-7, 1-7 Na Fianna, Bohermeen,
- Dunderry 0-10, 0-7 Gaeil Colmcille, Athboy,

Round 2:

- Gaeil Colmcille 0-10, 0-9 Castletown, Carlanstown,
- Ballivor 1-13, 1-7 Carnaross, Athboy,
- Donaghmore./Ashbourne 1-10, 0-7 Drumconrath, Duleek,
- Dunderry 3-9, 1-8 Na Fianna, Dunsany,

Round 3:

- Castletown 0-13, 1-7 Carnaross, Moynalty,
- Drumconrath 1-10, 1-10 Ballivor, Kells,
- Donaghmore/Ashbourne 0-12, 0-6 Dunderry, Dunsany,
- Gaeil Colmcille 2-11, 0-10 Na Fianna, Kildalkey,

Round 4:

- Castletown 0-11, 0-7 Drumconrath, Nobber,
- Ballivor 1-11, 0-4 Dunderry, Trim,
- Donaghmore/Ashbourne 0-15, 1-7 Na Fianna, Dunsany,
- Gaeil Colmcille 2-18, 1-6 Carnaross, Moynalty,

Round 5:

- Castletown 2-7, 1-4 Dunderry, Kells,
- Na Fianna 2-9, 0-12 Ballivor, Longwood,
- Donaghmore/Ashbourne 1-9, 0-10 Gaeil Colmcille, Pairc Tailteann,
- Drumconrath 0-15, 2-7 Carnaross, Kilmainhamwood,

Round 6:

- Castletown 1-12, 0-11 Na Fianna, Bohermeen,
- Donaghmore/Ashbourne 0-11, 0-6 Ballivor, Kilmessan,
- Drumconrath 1-10, 1-9 Gaeil Colmcille, Carlanstown,
- Dunderry 0-13, 0-5 Carnaross, Kilberry,

Round 7:

- Castletown 2-10, 1-11 Donaghmore/Ashbourne, Seneschalstown,
- Gaeil Colmcille 0-8, 0-8 Ballivor, Athboy,
- Drumconrath 0-13, 0-7 Dunderry, Kilberry,
- Carnaross 0-11, 1-7 Na Fianna, Bohermeen,

=== Group B ===
Team	Pld	W	L	D	PF	PA	PD	Pts
Oldcastle	7	4	0	3	82	64	+18	11
St. Colmcille's	7	5	1	1	68	67	+1	11
Rathkenny	7	4	2	1	80	63	+17	9
Nobber	7	2	1	4	95	86	+9	8
Syddan	7	3	3	1	81	72	+9	7
St. Michael's	7	2	5	0	81	90	-9	4
Ratoath	7	2	5	0	73	83	-10	4
Slane	7	0	5	2	71	106	-35	2

Round 1:

- Nobber 1-6, 0-9 Oldcastle, Carlanstown,
- Ratoath 1-10, 1-7 Rathkenny, Donore,
- Syddan 1-14, 1-6 Slane, Rathkenny,
- St. Colmcille's 1-10, 1-8 St. Michael's, Slane,

Round 2:

- Rathkenny 2-6, 1-9 Nobber, Kilberry,
- Oldcastle 1-7, 1-5 St. Michael's, Carnaross,
- Syddan 1-12, 0-6 Ratoath, Walterstown,
- St. Colmcille's 0-12, 0-7 Slane, Donore,

Round 3:

- Nobber 1-11, 0-14 Syddan, Drumconrath,
- Oldcastle 1-12, 0-11 Rathkenny, Carlanstown,
- St. Michael's 3-10, 1-13 Slane, Rathkenny,
- St. Colmcille's 1-6, 0-6 Ratoath, Seneschaltown,

Round 4:

- St. Colmcille's 2-7, 1-8 Nobber, Slane,
- Rathkenny 0-7, 0-6 St. Michael's, Castletown,
- Oldcastle 2-10, 0-7 Syddan, Kells,
- Ratoath 2-10, 0-7 Slane, Skryne,

Round 5:

- Nobber 1-12, 2-9 Slane, Rathkenny,
- Rathkenny 1-7, 0-9 Syddan, Drumconrath,
- Oldcastle 0-9, 0-9 St. Colmcille's, Kilberry,
- St. Michael's 3-7, 1-11 Ratoath, Seneschalstown,

Round 6:

- Nobber 1-11, 2-3 Ratoath, Seneschalstown,
- Rathkenny 2-8, 0-2 St. Colmcille's, Slane,
- Oldcastle 1-8, 1-8 Slane, Kilberry,
- Syddan 0-10, 0-7 St. Michael's, Castletown,

Round 7:

- Nobber 3-11, 0-14 St. Michael's, Castletown,
- Rathkenny 0-16, 0-6 Slane, Seneschalstown,
- Oldcastle 0-12, 0-9 Ratoath, Kilberry,
- St. Colmcille's 1-7, 0-9 Syddan, Donore,

== Knock-out Stage ==
=== Relegation Play Off ===
The two bottom finishers from the group stage qualify for the relegation final.

Relegation Final:

- Na Fianna 3-9, 1-9 Slane, Dunsany, 14/10/2006,

=== Finals ===
The teams in the quarter-finals are the second placed teams from each group and one group winner. The teams in the semi-finals are two group winners and the quarter-final winners.

Quarter-finals
1	Castletown	0-13
8	Nobber	0-10
4	Donaghmore/Ashbourne	1-4
5	Rathkenny	1-8
2	St. Colmcille's	0-9
7	Drumconrath	0-12
3	Oldcastle	1-12
6	Gaeil Colmcille	0-7

Semi-finals
Castletown	0-8
Rathkenny	1-9
Drumconrath	1-11
Oldcastle	0-13

Final
Rathkenny	1-10
Drumconrath	2-6

Quarter-finals:

- Castletown 0-13, 0-10 Nobber, Syddan, 24/9/2006,
- Rathkenny 1-8, 1-4 Donaghmore/Ashbourne, Seneschalstown, 24/9/2006,
- Drumconrath 0-12, 0-9 St. Colmcille's, 24/9/2006, Seneschalstown,
- Oldcastle 1-12, 0-7 Gaeil Colmcille, 24/9/2006,

Semi-finals:

- Rathkenny 1-9, 0-8 Castletown, Pairc Tailteann, 1/10/2006,
- Drumconrath 1-11, 0-13 Oldcastle, Pairc Tailteann, 1/10/2006,

Final:

- Rathkenny 1-10, 2-6 Drumconrath, Pairc Tailteann, 15/10/2006,

== Leinster Intermediate Club Football Championship ==
Preliminary round:

- St. Martin's 1-7, 0-7 Rathkenny, Piercetown, 4/11/2006,
