= Ballivor GFC =

Gaelic sports club in County Meath, Ireland

Ballivor
- Baile Íomhair
- Founded: 1929
- County: Meath
- Colours
- Grounds: Ballivor GAA Club

Playing kits
Standard colours

Senior Club Championships
| | All Ireland | Leinster champions | Meath champions |
|---|---|---|---|
| Football: | 0 | 0 | 0 |

Ballivor GFC is a Gaelic Athletic Association club in Ballivor, County Meath, Ireland. The club is affiliated to the Meath County Board and fields teams primarily in Gaelic football.

== History ==
Based in the village of Ballivor, approximately 14 km from Trim, Ballivor GFC was founded in 1929. Ballivor have contested only one Meath SFC final which was against Navan O'Mahonys in 1973, a final where they lost 1–09 to 1-07. Ballivor have won 4 Meath IFC titles, their last victory being in 2002 against Navan O'Mahonys in a final they won 2–05 to 0–10. Ballivor were relegated immediately in the following season, and have never been in the senior ranks since. They won a Meath JFC against Navan O'Mahonys B in 2011. They went on to win the Leinster Junior Club Football Championship the same year, beating St Fechin's of Louth 1–15 to 1-08. They lost to Connacht champions Clonbur in the All-Ireland Junior Club Football Championship 3–04 to 0–03 at the semi-final stage. Their last title victory, as of 2026, was in 2020 against St Vincent's in the Meath JFC final. As of 2026, Ballivor compete in the Meath Intermediate Football Championship.

== Honour ==
- Meath Senior Football Championship (0): (runners-up in 1973)
- Meath Intermediate Football Championship (4): 1948, 1971, 1981, 2002 (runners-up in 2000, 2001)
- Meath Junior 'A' Football Championship (2): 2011, 2020 (runners-up in 1945, 2010)
- Leinster Junior Club Football Championship (1): 2011
- Feis Cup (1): 1950

== Notable Players ==
- Bertie Cunningham: All-Ireland SFC-winner (1967)
- Paddy Dixon: All-Ireland SFC-winner (1949)

| Preceded by Blackhall Gaels | Meath Intermediate Football Champions; 2002 | Succeeded by Navan O'Mahonys |
