= 1994 Meath Intermediate Football Championship =

Meath I.F.C.
- Season: 1994
- Champions: Kilmainhamwood; 3rd Intermediate Football Championship title
- Relegated: Dunsany; Meath Hill; Navan O'Mahonys 'B'; Nobber
- Matches: ??

The 1994 Meath Intermediate Football Championship is the 68th edition of the Meath GAA's premier club Gaelic football tournament for intermediate graded teams in County Meath, Ireland. The tournament consists of 20 teams. The championship starts with a group stage and then progresses to a knock out stage.

This was Cortown's debut in the middle grade as they were promoted from the J.F.C. after claiming the 1993 Meath Junior Football Championship title.

On 9 October 1994, Kilmainhamwood claimed their 2nd Intermediate championship title when they defeated Simonstown Gaels 2–11 to 1–8 in the final at Pairc Tailteann.

== Team changes ==
The following teams have changed division since the 1993 championship season.

=== From I.F.C. ===
Promoted to S.F.C.

- Carnaross - (Intermediate Champions)

Relegated to 1994 J.A.F.C.

- None

=== To I.F.C. ===
Regraded from S.F.C.

- None

Promoted from 1993 J.A.F.C.

- Cortown - (Junior 'A' Champions)

== Group stage ==
There are 4 groups called Group A, B, C and D. The top two finishers in all groups will qualify for the quarter-finals.

=== Group A ===
Team	Pld	W	L	D	PF	PA	PD	Pts
Cortown	4	2	0	2	0	0	+0	6
Rathkenny	4	2	0	2	0	0	+0	6
Ballivor	4	2	0	2	0	0	+0	6
Dunsany	4	1	3	0	0	0	+0	2
Meath Hill	4	0	4	0	0	0	+0	0

Round 1:

- Cortown 1–11, 2-8 Rathkenny, Martry, 10/4/1994,
- Ballivor 4-13, 0-3 Dunsany, Summerhill, 10/4/1994,
- Meath Hill - Bye,

Round 2:

- Cortown 2–7, 2-7 Ballivor, Athboy, 8/5/1994,
- Rathkenny 1-12, 1-7 Meath Hill, Castletown, 8/5/1994,
- Dunsany - Bye,

Round 3:

- Dunsany 0-14, 0-8 Meath Hill, Kilberry, 28/5/1994,
- Rathkenny 0–12, 0-12 Ballivor, Kells, 29/5/1994,
- Cortown - Bye,

Round 4:

- Cortown 2-11, 0-9 Meath Hill, Castletown, 11/6/1994,
- Rathkenny w, l Dunsany, Walterstown, 21/6/1994,
- Ballivor - Bye,

Round 5:

- Ballivor w, l Meath Hill, Martry, 10/7/1994,
- Cortown 5-12, 0-3 Dunsany, Kilberry, 16/8/1994,
- Rathkenny - Bye,

Quarter-final Playoffs:

- Cortown 0–9, 1-6 Ballivor, Athboy, 24/8/1994,
- Cortown 3-17, 0-6 Ballivor, Athboy, 29/8/1994,
- Rathkenny 1-8, 1-6 Ballivor, Kells, 4/9/1994,

=== Group B ===
Team	Pld	W	L	D	PF	PA	PD	Pts
Simonstown Gaels	4	4	0	0	0	0	+0	8
Dunshaughlin	4	3	1	0	0	0	+0	6
Donaghmore	4	1	3	0	0	0	+0	2
Syddan	4	1	3	0	0	0	+0	2
Moynalty	4	1	3	0	0	0	+0	2

Round 1:

- Dunshaughlin 3-20, 0-2 Moynalty, Pairc Tailteann, 16/4/1994,
- Syddan w, l Donaghmore, Duleek, 16/4/1994,
- Simonstown Gaels - Bye,

Round 2:

- Moynalty 1-10, 2-6 Syddan, Carlanstown, 7/5/1994,
- Simonstown Gaels 1-14, 1-2 Donaghmore, Skryne, 8/5/1994,
- Dunshaughlin - Bye,

Round 3:

- Simonstown Gaels 3-6, 1-6 Dunshaughlin, Skryne, 28/5/1994,
- Donaghmore 2-11, 1-12 Moynalty, Kilmessan, 29/5/1994,
- Syddan - Bye,

Round 4:

- Dunshaughlin 0-11, 0-8 Donaghmore, Dunboyne, 2/7/1994,
- Simonstown Gaels 1-9, 1-5 Syddan, Nobber, 10/7/1994,
- Moynalty - Bye,

Round 5:

- Simonstown Gaels w, l Moynalty, Kells, 20/8/1994,
- Dunshaughlin w, l Syddan, Seneschalstown, 20/8/1994,
- Donaghmore - Bye,

=== Group C ===
Team	Pld	W	L	D	PF	PA	PD	Pts
St. Patrick's	4	4	0	0	0	0	+0	8
St. Mary's Donore	4	3	1	0	0	0	+0	6
St. Ultan's	4	2	3	0	0	0	+0	4
Gaeil Colmcille 'B'	4	2	2	0	0	0	+0	2
Navan O'Mahonys 'B'	4	0	4	0	0	0	+0	0

Round 1:

- St. Patrick's 1-6, 0-7 St. Mary's, Bellewstown, 10/4/1994,
- Gaeil Colmcille 'B' w, l Navan O'Mahonys 'B', Martry, 16/4/1994,
- St. Ultan's - Bye,

Round 2:

- St. Mary's 2-8, 0-9 St. Ultan's, Walterstown, 30/4/1994,
- St. Patrick's w, l Gaeil Colmcille 'B', Walterstown, 8/5/1994,
- Navan O'Mahonys 'B' - Bye,

Round 3:

- St. Ultan's 1-15, 0-7 Navan O'Mahonys 'B', Dunderry, 14/5/1994,
- St. Mary's w, l Gaeil Colmcille 'B', Seneschalstown, 27/5/1994,
- St. Patrick's - Bye,

Round 4:

- St. Patrick's 0-10, 0-7 St. Ultan's, Rathkenny, 28/5/1994,
- St. Mary's 2-13, 0-6 Navan O'Mahonys 'B', Skryne, 2/7/1994,
- Gaeil Colmcille 'B' - Bye,

Round 5:

- St. Ultan's w, l Gaeil Colmcille 'B', Kilberry, 2/7/1994,
- St. Patrick's w, l Navan O'Mahonys 'B',
- St. Mary's - Bye,

=== Group D ===
Team	Pld	W	L	D	PF	PA	PD	Pts
Kilmainhamwood	4	4	0	0	0	0	+0	8
Ballinabrackey	4	2	1	1	0	0	+0	5
Athboy	4	2	1	1	0	0	+0	5
Castletown	4	1	3	0	0	0	+0	2
Nobber	4	0	4	0	0	0	+0	0

Round 1:

- Castletown 0-8, 0-5 Nobber, Rathkenny, 16/4/1994,
- Kilmainhamwood 2-15, 0-9 Athboy, Kilberry, 16/4/1994,
- Ballinabrackey - Bye,

Round 2:

- Kilmainhamwood 2-8, 0-6 Castletown, Nobber, 8/5/1994,
- Ballinabrackey 1–8, 1-8 Athboy, Summerhill, 27/5/1994,
- Nobber - Bye,

Round 3:

- Ballinabrackey w, l Nobber, Dunderry, 19/6/1994,
- Athboy w, l Castletown, Kells, 19/6/1994,
- Kilmainhamwood - Bye,

Round 4:

- Athboy 2-10, 0-10 Nobber, Kells, 9/7/1994,
- Kilmainhamwood 1-15, 1-9 Ballinabrackey, Athboy, 10/7/1994,
- Castletown - Bye,

Round 5:

- Ballinabrackey w, l Castletown, Dunderry, 28/7/1994,
- Kilmainhamwood w, l Nobber,
- Athboy - Bye,

Quarter-final Playoffs:

- Ballinabrackey 2-10, 1-7 Athboy, Ballivor, 20/8/1994,

== Knock-out Stages ==
=== Finals ===
The teams in the quarter-finals are the top two finishers from each group.

Quarter-Finals
Kilmainhamwood	0-14
Rathkenny	0-7
Dunshaughlin	1-6
St. Patrick's	0-2
Simonstown Gaels	0-13
St. Mary's	0-6
Cortown	2-10
Ballinabrackey	0-12

Semi-Finals
Kilmainhamwood	0-10
Dunshaughlin	0-7
Simonstown Gaels	w (R)
Cortown	l (R)

Final
Kilmainhamwood	2-11
Simonstown Gaels	1-8

Quarter-final:

- Simonstown Gaels 0-13, 0-6 St. Mary's, Pairc Tailteann, 28/8/1994,
- Dunshaughlin 1-6, 0-2 St. Patrick's, Skryne, 28/8/1994,
- Cortown 2-10, 0-12 Ballinabrackey, Trim, 4/9/1994,
- Kilmainhamwood 0-14, 0-7 Rathkenny, Kells, 11/9/1994,

Semi-final:

- Simonstown Gaels 0–13, 1-10 Cortown, Kells, 17/9/1994,
- Kilmainhamwood 0-10, 0-7 Dunshaughlin, Seneschalstown, 17/9/1994,

Semi-final Replay:

- Simonstown Gaels w, l Cortown, Pairc Tailteann, 24/9/1994,

Final:

- Kilmainhamwood 2-11, 1-8 Simonstown Gaels, Pairc Tailteann, 9/10/1994,
