= 2003 Meath Intermediate Football Championship =

Meath I.F.C.
- Season: 2003
- Champions: Navan O'Mahonys; 2nd Intermediate Football Championship title
- Relegated: St. Ultan's
- Leinster ICFC: Navan O'Mahonys (first round), Dundalk Gaels w/o, scr Navan O'Mahonys
- All Ireland ICFC: n/a

The 2003 Meath Intermediate Football Championship is the 77th edition of the Meath GAA's premier club Gaelic football tournament for intermediate graded teams in County Meath, Ireland. The tournament consists of 16 teams, with the winner going on to represent Meath in the Leinster Intermediate Club Football Championship. The championship starts with a group stage and then progresses to a knock out stage.

This was Oldcastle's first year in this grade since 1987, after 15 years in the Senior grade since being relegated in 2002.

Nobber were promoted after claiming the 2002 Meath Junior Football Championship title, their first year in the intermediate grade since being relegated in the early 1990s.

In October 2003, Navan O'Mahonys claimed their 2nd ever Intermediate championship title when they defeated Carnaross 3-14 to 0-6.

St. Ultan's were relegated after 3 years as an Intermediate club.

== Team changes ==
The following teams have changed division since the 2002 championship season.

=== From I.F.C. ===
Promoted to S.F.C.

- Ballivor - (Intermediate Champions)

Relegated to J.A.F.C.

- Moynalvey

=== To I.F.C. ===
Relegted from S.F.C.

- Oldcastle

Promoted from J.A.F.C.

- Nobber - (Junior 'A' Champions)

== Group stage ==
There are 2 groups called Group A and B. The 4 top finishers in Group A and B will qualify for the quarter-finals. The 2 teams that finish last in their groups will play in a relegation play off.

=== Group A ===
Team	Pld	W	L	D	PF	PA	PD	Pts
Syddan	7	5	1	1	96	70	+26	11
Navan O'Mahonys	7	5	2	0	95	67	+28	10
Castletown	7	4	2	1	80	71	+9	9
Na Fianna	7	3	3	1	93	85	+8	7
Drumree	7	2	2	3	62	71	-9	7
Rathkenny	7	2	4	1	71	118	-47	5
Drumconrath	7	2	5	0	77	79	-2	4
Curraha	7	1	5	1	65	80	-15	3

Round 1:

- Syddan 0-11, 0-9 Na Fianna, Dunderry,
- Navan O'Mahonys 2-8, 0-8 Curraha,
- Drumconrath 1-13, 1-2 Rathkenny,
- Castletown 0-8, 0-8 Drumree, Bective,

Round 2:

- Syddan 0-9, 2-3 Curraha, Rathkenny,
- Navan O'Mahonys 1-10, 0-4 Drumree,
- Castletown 1-10, 1-7 Rathkenny, Nobber,
- Na Fianna 1-13, 1-10 Drumconrath,

Round 3:

- Syddan 1-11, 1-8 Navan O'Mahonys, Castletown,
- Drumree 2-9, 0-15 Rathkenny, Duleek,
- Castletown 3-6, 2-4 Na Fianna, Athboy,
- Curraha 2-10, 1-11 Drumconrath, Rathkenny

Round 4:

- Drumconrath 1-10, 1-8 Syddan, Nobber,
- Rathkenny 2-9, 0-13 Navan O'Mahonys,
- Castletown 2-9, 1-6 Curraha, Rathkenny,
- Drumree 1-5, 0-8 Na Fianna,

Round 5:

- Syddan 0-13, 1-9 Castletown, Rathkenny,
- Navan O'Mahonys 1-9, 0-5 Drumconrath,
- Na Fianna 3-17, 1-7 Rathkenny,
- Drumree 1-4, 0-6 Curraha,

Round 6:

- Syddan 1-9, 1-7 Drumree, Simonstown,
- Navan O'Mahonys 2-12, 2-7 Na Fianna,
- Rathkenny 0-10, 0-7 Curraha, Duleek,
- Castletown 0-9, 0-7 Drumconrath, Meath Hill,

Round 7:

- Syddan 3-17, 0-6 Rathkenny, Drumconrath,
- Navan O'Mahonys 1-11, 0-8 Castletown, Kilberry,
- Drumree 1-7, 1-6 Drumconrath,
- Na Fianna 0-11, 0-10 Curraha, Dunsany,

=== Group B ===
Team	Pld	W	L	D	PF	PA	PD	Pts
Duleek	7	7	0	0	118	58	+60	14
Carnaross	7	4	2	1	101	81	+20	9
Oldcastle	7	4	2	1	92	76	+16	9
St. Colmcille's	7	3	3	1	89	78	+11	7
Nobber	7	3	3	1	98	90	+8	7
Slane	7	2	4	1	73	98	-25	5
Donaghmore/Ashbourne	7	0	4	3	56	105	-49	3
St. Ultans	7	0	4	2	60	101	-41	2

Round 1:

- Carnaross 3-11, 0-5 Slane,
- Oldcastle 1-13, 0-8 Nobber, Kells, 11/4/2003,
- Duleek 1-14, 1-9 St. Colmcille's,
- Donaghmore/Ashbourne 1-7, 1-7 St Ultan's,

Round 2:

- Oldcastle 2-10, 0-6 Donaghmore/Ashbourne,
- Carnaross 1-6, 1-6 St. Ultan's,
- Duleek 1-12, 0-4 Slane,
- St. Colmcille's 2-10, 0-10 Nobber,

Round 3:

- Duleek 1-8, 1-6 St. Ultan's,
- Carnaross 1-11, 0-9 Oldcastle,
- St. Colmcille's 2-12, 0-9 Slane, Duleek,
- Nobber 1-8 0-11 Donaghmore/Ashbourne,

Round 4:

- Duleek 3-7, 1-7 Oldcastle,
- Nobber 2-10, 3-6 Carnaross, Carlanstown,
- Slane 1-13, 1-7 St. Ultan's,
- St. Colmcille's 1-6, 0-9 Donaghmore/Ashbourne,

Round 5:

- St Colmcille's 0-13, 0-10 St Ultan's,
- Duleek 0-12, 0-10 Nobber, Kilberry,
- Slane 1-8, 0-11 Oldcastle,
- Carnaross 4-15, 1-4 Donaghmore/Ashbourne,

Round 6:

- Oldcastle 1-12, 0-7 St. Ultan's,
- Nobber 1-13, 3-6 Slane,
- Duleek 4-7, 0-5 Donaghmore/Ashbourne,
- Carnaross 1-5, 0-7 St. Colmcille's,

Round 7:

- Oldcastle 1-12, 1-11 St. Colmcille's,
- Duleek 5-13, 1-5 Carnaross,
- Slane 2-7, 1-5 Donaghmore/Ashbourne,
- Nobber 4-15, 1-2 St. Ultan's.

== Knock-out Stage ==
=== Relegation Play Off ===
The two bottom finishers from the group stage qualify for the relegation final.

Relegation Final:

- Curraha +3, -3 St. Ultan's.

=== Finals ===
The teams in the quarter-finals are the second placed teams from each group and one group winner. The teams in the semi-finals are two group winners and the quarter-final winners.

Quarter-finals
1	Syddan	1-13
8	St. Colmcille's	2-4
4	Navan O'Mahonys	w
5	Oldcastle	l
2	Carnaross	3-7
7	Castletown	1-7
3	Duleek	4-11
6	Na Fianna	2-5

Semi-finals
Syddan	0-5
Navan O'Mahonys	2-9
Carnaross	1-10
Duleek	0-7

Final
Navan O'Mahonys	3-14
Carnaross	0-6

Quarter-finals:

- Syddan 1-13, 2-4 St. Colmcille's, Pairc Tailteann,
- Navan O'Mahonys w, l Oldcastle,
- Carnaross 3-7, 1-7 Castletown, Moynalty,
- Duleek 4-11, 2-5 Na Fianna, Dunsany,

Semi-finals:

- Navan O'Mahonys 2-9, 0-5 Syddan, Pairc Tailteann,
- Carnaross 1-10, 0-7 Duleek, Pairc Tailteann,

Final:

- Navan O'Mahonys 3-14, 0-6 Carnaross, Pairc Tailteann.
