= 1955 Meath Intermediate Football Championship =

Meath I.F.C.
- Season: 1955
- Champions: Duleek; 2nd Intermediate Football Championship title
- Relegated: Donore; Enfield; Oldcastle; St. Patrick's

The 1955 Meath Intermediate Football Championship is the 29th edition of the Meath GAA's premier club Gaelic football tournament for intermediate graded teams in County Meath, Ireland. The tournament consists of 12 teams. The championship format consists of a group stage before progressing to a knock-out stage.

Dunshaughlin, Oldcastle, St. Patrick's and Summerhill were regraded from the 1954 S.F.C.

At the end of the season Donore, Enfield, Oldcastle and St. Patrick's applied to be regraded to the 1956 J.A.F.C.

On 23 October 1955, Duleek claimed their 2nd Intermediate championship title when they defeated Slane 1-9 to 2-4 in the final at Pairc Tailteann. This was the first game to be played at the newly renovated pitch along with the S.F.C. final.

== Team changes ==
The following teams have changed division since the 1954 championship season.

=== From I.F.C. ===
Promoted to 1955 S.F.C.

- Ballinlough

Relegated to 1955 J.A.F.C.

- Dunderry
- Kilcloon

=== To I.F.C. ===
Regraded from 1954 S.F.C.

- Dunshaughlin
- Oldcastle
- St. Patrick's
- Summerhill

Promoted from 1954 J.F.C.

- Donore - (Junior Runners-Up & East Divisional Champions)
- Shale Rovers - (Junior Semi-Finalists & North Divisional Champions)
- Enfield - (Junior Semi-Finalists & South Divisional Champions)

== Group stage ==
There are 2 groups called Group A and B. The top finisher in each group will qualify for the Final. Many results were unavailable in the Meath Chronicle.

=== Group A ===
Team	Pld	W	L	D	PF	PA	PD	Pts
Slane	5	5	0	0	0	0	+0	10
Drumbaragh	4	3	1	0	0	0	+0	6
Shale Rovers	5	3	2	0	0	0	+0	6
Donore	4	1	2	1	0	0	+0	3
Oldcastle	5	1	4	0	0	0	+0	2
Navan O'Mahonys 'B'	5	0	4	1	0	0	+0	1

Round 1:

- Slane 1-5, 1-4 Drumbaragh, Cross Guns, 6/3/1955,
- Shale Rovers 2-5, 0-5 Oldcastle, Kells, 6/3/1955,
- Navan O'Mahonys 'B' 1-5, 1-5 Donore, Rathkenny, 13/3/1955,

Round 2:

- Slane w, l Donore, Rossin, 20/3/1955,
- Drumbaragh w, l Oldcastle, Kilskyre, 27/3/1955,
- Shale Rovers 3-8, 1-8 Navan O'Mahonys 'B', Kells, 17/4/1955,

Round 3:

- Donore 2-3, 0-5 Oldcastle, Pairc Tailteann, 10/4/1955,
- Drumbaragh 2-4, 0-7 Shale Rovers, Pairc Tailteann, 15/5/1955,
- Slane 2-6, 0-6 Navan O'Mahonys 'B', Rathkenny, 5/6/1955,

Round 4:

- Shale Rovers 1-7, 0-4 Donore, Rathkenny, 5/6/1955,
- Slane 1-4, 0-4 Oldcastle, Pairc Tailteann, 26/6/1955,
- Drumbaragh w/o, scr Navan O'Mahonys 'B', Kells, 17/7/1955,

Round 5:

- Slane w, l Shale Rovers, Newtown, 10/7/1955,
- Oldcastle w/o, scr Navan O'Mahonys 'B',
- Drumbaragh -vs- Donore,

=== Group B ===
Team	Pld	W	L	D	PF	PA	PD	Pts
Duleek	5	4	1	0	0	0	+0	8
Dunshaughlin	5	4	1	0	0	0	+0	8
Ballinabrackey	2	1	1	0	0	0	+0	2
Summerhill	2	0	2	0	0	0	+0	0
St. Patrick's	2	0	2	0	0	0	+0	0
Enfield	2	0	2	0	0	0	+0	0

Round 1:

- Ballinabrackey -vs- St. Patrick's, Skryne, 6/3/1955,
- Summerhill -vs- Enfield, Rathmolyon, 6/3/1955,
- Duleek 1-9, 1-6 Dunshaughlin, Skryne, 15/5/1955,

Round 2:

- Summerhill -vs- Ballinabrackey, Rathmolyon, 10/4/1955,
- Duleek 0-9, 1-5 St. Patrick's, Ardcath, 5/6/1955,
- Dunshaughlin 2-5, 1-3 Enfield, Summerhill, 5/6/1955,

Round 3:

- Dunshaughlin w, l St. Patrick's, Skryne, 26/6/1955,
- Duleek w, l Summerhill, Skryne, 26/6/1955,
- Ballinabrackey -vs- Enfield, Clonard, 10/7/1955,

Round 4:

- Dunshaughlin w, l Summerhill, Trim, 17/7/1955,
- Ballinabrackey w, l Duleek, Trim, 17/7/1955,
- St. Patrick's -vs- Enfield,

Round 5:

- Dunshaughlin w, l Ballinabrackey, Summerhill, 28/8/1955,
- Duleek w, l Enfield, Trim, 28/8/1955,
- St. Patrick's -vs- Summerhill,

Final Play-Off:

- Duleek w, l Dunshaughlin, Skryne, 9/10/1955,

== Final ==
- Duleek 1-9, 2-4 Slane, Pairc Tailteann, 23/10/1955,
