= 1968 Meath Intermediate Football Championship =

Meath I.F.C.
- Season: 1968
- Champions: Slane; 2nd Intermediate Football Championship title
- Relegated: United Gaels

The 1968 Meath Intermediate Football Championship is the 42nd edition of the Meath GAA's premier club Gaelic football tournament for intermediate graded teams in County Meath, Ireland. The tournament consists of 18 teams. The championship starts with a group stage and then progresses to a knock out stage.

No team was regraded from the S.F.C. the previous year.

This year marked United Gaels first year in existence as a result of the amalgamation of Junior 'A' clubs Drumconrath and Meath Hill.

Dunshaughlin and Athboy were promoted after claiming the 1967 Meath Junior Football Championship title and Junior 'A' Divisional runners-up spot respectively. Dunderry were also promoted after their application to be promoted was granted by the County Board.

At the end of the season United Gaels applied to be regraded to the 1969 J.F.C.

On 20 October 1968, Slane claimed their 1st Intermediate championship title when they defeated Bohermeen 1-9 to 1-7 in the final in Pairc Tailteann.

== Team changes ==
The following teams have changed division since the 1967 championship season.

=== From I.F.C. ===
Promoted to S.F.C.

- Seneschalstown - (Intermediate Champions)
- Oldcastle - (Application to be promoted granted by the County Board)

Relegated to 1968 J.A.F.C.

- Ballinabrackey
- Garryowen
- Rathmolyon

=== To I.F.C. ===
Regraded from S.F.C.

- None

Promoted from 1967 J.A.F.C. & J.B.F.C.

- Dunshaughlin - (Junior Champions)
- Athboy - (Junior 'A' Divisional Runners-Up)
- Dunderry - (Application to be promoted granted by the County Board)
- United Gaels - (Amalgamation of Junior clubs Drumconrath and Meath Hill)

== Group stage ==
There are 4 groups called Group A, B, C and D. The top finisher in each group will qualify for the Semi-Finals. Many results were unavailable.

=== Group A ===
Team	Pld	W	L	D	PF	PA	PD	Pts
Bohermeen	4	3	1	0	0	0	+0	6
Dunshaughlin	4	3	1	0	0	0	+0	6
Dunderry	4	3	1	0	0	0	+0	6
Martry	4	1	3	0	0	0	+0	2
Kilallon	4	0	4	0	0	0	+0	0

Round 1:

- Dunderry w, l Martry, Athboy, 21/4/1968,
- Dunshaughlin w, l Kilallon, Athboy, 21/4/1968,
- Bohermeen - Bye,

Round 2:

- Martry w, l Kilallon, Athboy, 19/5/1968,
- Dunshaughlin w, l Bohermeen, Kilmessan, 19/5/1968,
- Dunderry - Bye,

Round 3:

- Dunderry w, l Kilallon, Athboy, 2/6/1968,
- Bohermeen w, l Martry, Kells, 16/6/1968,
- Dunshaughlin - Bye,

Round 4:

- Dunderry 3-6, 0-9 Dunshaughlin, Skryne, 16/6/1968,
- Bohermeen 1-10, 0-7 Kilallon, Kells, 23/6/1968,
- Martry - Bye,

Round 5:

- Bohermeen 2-9, 1-6 Dunderry, Pairc Tailteann, 14/7/1968,
- Dunshaughlin w/o, scr Martry,
- Kilallon - Bye,

Semi-Final Playoff:

- Dunshaughlin 0-6, 1-3 Dunderry, Kilmessan, 28/7/1968,
- Dunshaughlin 1-9, 2-5 Dunderry, Trim, 7/9/1968,
- Bohermeen 2-11, 0-5 Dunshaughlin, Pairc Tailteann, 15/9/1968,

=== Group B ===
Team	Pld	W	L	D	PF	PA	PD	Pts
Slane	3	3	0	0	0	0	+0	6
Syddan	2	2	0	0	0	0	+0	4
Rathkenny	3	2	1	0	0	0	+0	4
Castletown	4	1	3	0	0	0	+0	2
United Gaels	4	0	4	0	0	0	+0	0

Round 1:

- Syddan w, l Castletown, Kilberry, 21/4/1968,
- Slane 1-6, 0-7 Rathkenny, Pairc Tailteann, 21/4/1968,
- United Gaels - Bye,

Round 2:

- Syddan w, l United Gaels, Castletown, 28/4/1968,
- Rathkenny 2-11, 2-7 Castletown, Gibbstown, 5/5/1968,
- Slane - Bye,

Round 3:

- Slane w, l Castletown, Gibbstown, 19/5/1968,
- Rathkenny w, l United Gaels, Castletown, 19/5/1968,
- Syddan - Bye,

Round 4:

- Slane v Syddan, Castletown, 26/5/1968,
- Castletown w, l United Gaels, Cross Guns, 9/6/1968,
- Rathkenny - Bye,

Round 5:

- Slane w, l United Gaels,
- Syddan v Rathkenny,
- Castletown - Bye,

=== Group C ===
Team	Pld	W	L	D	PF	PA	PD	Pts
Enfield	3	2	0	1	0	0	+0	5
Ballivor	3	2	0	1	0	0	+0	5
Summerhill	3	1	2	0	0	0	+0	2
Athboy	3	0	3	0	0	0	+0	0

Round 1:

- Ballivor w, l Athboy, Kildalkey, 5/5/1968,
- Enfield 1-11, 2-7 Summerhill, Trim, 23/6/1968,

Round 2:

- Enfield w, l Athboy, Trim, 19/5/1968,
- Ballivor w, l Summerhill, Trim, 19/5/1968,

Round 3:

- Ballivor d, d Enfield, Summerhill, 16/6/1968,
- Summerhill w/o, scr Athboy,

Semi-Final Playoff:

- Enfield d, d Ballivor, Trim, 14/7/1968,
- Enfield w, l Ballivor, Trim, 25/8/1968,

=== Group D ===
Team	Pld	W	L	D	PF	PA	PD	Pts
Drumree	3	3	0	0	0	0	+0	6
Salesian College Warrenstown	3	2	1	0	0	0	+0	4
St. Peter's Dunboyne	3	1	2	0	0	0	+0	2
Gaeil Colmcille 'B'	3	0	3	0	0	0	+0	0

Round 1:

- Drumree w/o, scr Gaeil Colmcille 'B', Athboy, 5/5/1968,
- Warrenstown w, l St. Peter's Dunboyne, Kilcloon, 5/5/1968,

Round 2:

- Drumree w, l St. Peter's Dunboyne, Kilcloon, 19/5/1968,
- Warrenstown w/o, scr Gaeil Colmcille 'B',

Round 3:

- Drumree w, l Warrenstown, Drumree, 16/6/1968,
- St. Peter's Dunboyne w/o, scr Gaeil Colmcille ' B',

== Knock-out Stages ==
The teams in the Semi-Finals are the first and second placed teams from each group.

Semi-Finals
Bohermeen	w
Enfield	l
Slane	w
Drumree	l

Final
Slane	1-9
Bohermeen	1-7

Semi-Final:

- Slane w, l Drumree, Skryne, 28/7/1968,
- Bohermeen w, l Enfield, Trim, 6/10/1968,

Final:

- Slane 1-9, 1-7 Bohermeen, Pairc Tailteann, 20/10/1968,
