= Curraha GAA =

Gaelic sports club in County Meath, Ireland

Curraha
- Currach Átha
- Founded: 1903
- County: Meath
- Colours
- Grounds: Joe McDermott Park

Playing kits
Standard colours

Senior Club Championships
	All Ireland	Leinster champions	Meath champions
Football:	0	0	0

Curraha GAA is a Gaelic Athletic Association in Curraha, County Meath, Ireland. The club is affiliated to the Meath County Board and fields teams primarily in Gaelic football.

== History ==
Located in the village of Curraha, approximately 5km from Ashbourne, Curraha was founded in 1903. Curraha have won 1 Meath IFC title, when they played against St Michael's and won 1-17 to 1-07. Curraha have won 5 Meath JFC titles, last winning one in 2026 where they beat Ballinlough 3-15 to 1-12.

Curraha have also won a Leinster Junior Club Football Championship title in the 2015 season against St Brigid's, Killashee of Longford 3-10 to 1-11. In the All-Ireland Junior Club Football Championship they were defeated Templenoe of Kerry 1-09 to 0-05.

In 2024, Curraha were relegated from the Meath SFC after losing the relegation final on penalties to Ballinabrackey. The following year Curraha were relegated again in the Meath IFC losing to Navan O'Mahonys in the relegation final. Curraha won the Meath JFC the following year. As of 2026 Curraha compete in the Meath IFC.

== Honours ==
- Meath Intermediate Football Championship (1): 2017
- Meath Junior 'A' Football Championship (5): 1941, 1976, 2001, 2015, 2026
- Meath Junior 'B' Football Championship (1): 1997
- Leinster Junior Club Football Championship (1): 2015

== Notable Players ==
- John McDermott: All-Ireland SFC-winner (1996, 1999)
- James McEntee

Preceded by St Colmcille's	Meath Intermediate Football Champions; 2017	Succeeded by Longwood
