= 1990 Meath Intermediate Football Championship =

Meath I.F.C.
- Season: 1990
- Champions: Dunderry; 4th Intermediate Football Championship title
- Relegated: Wolfe Tones
- Matches: ??

The 1990 Meath Intermediate Football Championship is the 64th edition of the Meath GAA's premier club Gaelic football tournament for intermediate graded teams in County Meath, Ireland. The tournament consists of 20 teams. The championship starts with a group stage and then progresses to a knock out stage.

This was St. Peter's Dunboyne's return to the grade as they were promoted from the J.F.C. after claiming the 1989 Meath Junior Football Championship title, and they almost won straight promotion through the grade, losing to Dunderry in the final.

On 14 October 1990, Dunderry claimed their 4th Intermediate championship title when they defeated St. Peter's Dunboyne 0–16 to 1–7 in the final at Pairc Tailteann, ending their run of 3 final losses in 3 years.

Wolfe Tones were regraded to the J.F.C. for 1991 after over 10 years as an Intermediate club.

== Team changes ==
The following teams have changed division since the 1989 championship season.

=== From I.F.C. ===
Promoted to S.F.C.

- St. Michael's - (Intermediate Champions)

Relegated to J.A.F.C.

- Duleek
- Ratoath

=== To I.F.C. ===
Regraded from S.F.C.

- None

Promoted from J.A.F.C.

- St. Peter's Dunboyne - (Junior 'A' Champions)

== Group stage ==
There are 4 groups called Group A, B, C and D. The top two finishers in all groups will qualify for the quarter-finals.

=== Group A ===
Team	Pld	W	L	D	PF	PA	PD	Pts
Ballinabrackey	4	4	0	0	51	27	+24	8
St. Mary's Donore	4	3	1	0	52*	34*	+18*	6
Bellewstown	4	2	2	0	32	48	-16	4
Martry Harps	4	1	3	0	48	42	+6	2
Ballivor	4	0	4	0	15*	37*	-22*	0

Round 1:

- Ballinabrackey 3-11, 0-5 Ballivor, Summerhill, 5/5/1990,
- St. Mary's 2-15, 1-8 Martry Harps, Seneschalstown, 6/5/1990,
- Bellewstown - Bye,

Round 2:

- St. Mary's 4-9, 1-6 Bellewstown, Skryne, 20/5/1990,
- Martry Harps 2-11, 1-7 Ballivor, Athboy, 20/5/1990,
- Ballinabrackey - Bye,

Round 3:

- Ballinabrackey 2-11, 1-9 Bellewstown, Dunshaughlin, 27/5/1990,
- St. Mary's w, l Ballivor,
- Martry Harps - Bye,

Round 4:

- Bellewstown 1-8, 1-7 Martry Harps, Dunshaughlin, 16/6/1990,
- Ballinabrackey 2-8, 1-7 St. Mary's, Dunderry, 16/6/1990,
- Ballivor - Bye,

Round 5:

- Bellewstown w/o, scr Ballivor,
- Ballinabrackey w/o, scr Martry Harps,
- St. Mary's - Bye

=== Group B ===
Team	Pld	W	L	D	PF	PA	PD	Pts
Dunderry	4	3	1	0	44*	40*	+4*	6
Rathkenny	4	1	1	2	31*	27*	+4*	4
Moynalty	4	1	1	2	44	45	-1	4
St. Patrick's	4	1	2	1	50	54	-4	3
Athboy	4	1	2	1	24**	27**	-3**	3

Round 1:

- Rathkenny 0–8, 0-8 Moynalty, Kells, 5/5/1990,
- Dunderry 2-12, 1-12 St. Patrick's, Skryne, 13/5/1990,
- Athboy - Bye,

Round 2:

- Dunderry w, l Athboy, Kells, 1/8/1990,
- Moynalty 0-14, 1-7 St. Patrick's, Seneschalstown, 1/8/1990,
- Rathkenny - Bye,

Round 3:

- Dunderry 0-16, 1-8 Moynalty, Cortown, 17/6/1990,
- Athboy w, l Rathkenny,
- St. Patrick's - Bye,

Round 4:

- St. Patrick's 1-13, 2-7 Athboy, Skryne, 16/6/1990,
- Rathkenny 2-8, 0-10 Dunderry, Seneschalstown, 8/7/1990,
- Moynalty - Bye,

Round 5:

- Moynalty 0–11, 0-11 Athboy, Kells, 8/7/1990,
- Rathkenny 0–9, 0-9 St. Patrick's, Seneschalstown, 31/7/1990,
- Dunderry - Bye

Quarter-final Playoff:

- Rathkenny 0-12, 0-11 Moynalty, Carlanstown, 14/8/1990,

=== Group C ===
Team	Pld	W	L	D	PF	PA	PD	Pts
St. Peter's Dunboyne	4	4	0	0	77	19	+58	8
Donaghmore	4	2	1	1	37	35	+2	5
Kilmainhamwood	4	2	2	0	49	45	+4	4
Meath Hill	4	1	3	0	14	48	-34	2
Wolfe Tones	4	0	3	1	15	45	-30	1

Round 1:

- St. Peter's Dunboyne 1-19, 0-3 Wolfe Tones, Dunshaughlin, 13/5/1990,
- Donaghmore 1-11, 1-8 Kilmainhamwood, Seneschalstown, 12/5/1990,
- Meath Hill - Bye,

Round 2:

- Donaghmore 0-12, 0-6 Meath Hill, Seneschalstown, 20/5/1990,
- Kilmainhamwood 3-9, 1-4 Wolfe Tones, Kells, 20/5/1990,
- St. Peter's Dunboyne - Bye,

Round 3:

- Donaghmore 0–5, 0-5 Wolfe Tones, Skryne, 26/5/1990,
- St. Peter's Dunboyne 3-15, 0-2 Meath Hill, Kilberry, 16/6/1990,
- Kilmainhamwood - Bye,

Round 4:

- Kilmainhamwood 0-12, 1-3 Meath Hill, Castletown, 7/7/1990,
- St. Peter's Dunboyne 0-13, 0-6 Donaghmore, Dunshaughlin, 8/7/1990,
- Wolfe Tones - Bye,

Round 5:

- St. Peter's Dunboyne 3-9, 0-8 Kilmainhamwood, Kilberry, 1/8/1990,
- Meath Hill w/o, scr Wolfe Tones,
- Donaghmore - Bye,

=== Group D ===
Team	Pld	W	L	D	PF	PA	PD	Pts
Navan O'Mahonys 'B'	4	3	0	1	51*	38*	+13*	7
Ballinlough	4	2	2	0	45*	34*	+11*	4
Dunsany	4	2	2	0	53	59	-6	4
Dunshaughlin	4	1	2	1	44	56	-12	3
Syddan	4	0	2	2	48	54	-6	2

Round 1:

- Dunshaughlin 2-13, 2-9 Dunsany, Skryne, 5/5/1990,
- Ballinlough 2-16, 3-8 Syddan, Carlanstown, 13/5/1990,
- Navan O'Mahonys 'B' - Bye,

Round 2:

- Navan O'Mahonys 'B' w, l Ballinlough,
- Syddan 0–8, 0-8 Dunshaughlin, Kilberry, 20/5/1990,
- Dunsany - Bye,

Round 3:

- Navan O'Mahonys 'B' 1-19, 3-7 Dunsany, Trim, 16/6/1990,
- Ballinlough 2-10, 0-7 Dunshaughlin, Walterstown, 16/6/1990,
- Syddan - Bye,

Round 4:

- Navan O'Mahonys 'B' 1–9, 2-6 Syddan, Rathkenny, 22/6/1990,
- Dunsany 2-4, 0-7 Ballinlough, Pairc Tailteann, 17/7/1990,
- Dunshaughlin - Bye,

Round 5:

- Navan O'Mahonys 'B' 1-14, 0-10 Dunshaughlin, ???, 8/7/1990,
- Dunsany 1-9, 1-8 Syddan, Seneschalstown, 20/7/1990,
- Ballinlough - Bye,

Quarter-final Playoff:

- Ballinlough 4-11, 1-7 Dunsany, Athboy, 1/8/1990,

== Knock-out Stages ==
=== Finals ===
The teams in the quarter-finals are the top two finishers from each group.

Quarter-Finals
Ballinabrackey	1-11
Ballinlough	1-7
Dunderry	5-10
Donaghmore	0-7
St. Peter's Dunboyne	1-12
Rathkenny	0-8
Navan O'Mahonys 'B'	1-7
St. Mary's	0-11

Semi-Finals
Ballinabrackey	1-3
Dunderry	2-18
St. Peter's Dunboyne	2-20
St. Mary's	1-2

Final
Dunderry	0-16
St. Peter's Dunboyne	1-7

Quarter-final:

- St. Mary's 1-11, 0-7 Navan O'Mahonys 'B', Seneschalstown, 2/8/1990,
- St. Peter's Dunboyne 1-12, 0-8 Rathkenny, Pairc Tailteann, 25/8/1990,
- Ballinabrackey 1-11, 1-7 Ballinlough, Pairc Tailteann, 26/8/1990,
- Dunderry 5-10, 0-7 Donaghmore, ???, 23/9/1990,

Semi-final:

- Dunderry 2-18, 1-3 Ballinabrackey, Pairc Tailteann, 30/9/1990,
- St. Peter's Dunboyne 2-20, 1-2 St. Mary's, Pairc Tailteann, 30/9/1990,

Final:

- Dunderry 0-16, 1-7 St. Peter's Dunboyne, Pairc Tailteann, 14/10/1990,
