= 1990 Meath Senior Football Championship =

Meath S.F.C.
- Season: 1990
- Champions: Navan O'Mahonys; 15th Senior Championship Title
- Relegated: n/a
- Leinster SCFC: Navan O'Mahonys (preliminary round) ???
- All Ireland SCFC: n/a
- Winning Captain: Colm Ratty (Navan O'Mahonys)
- Man of the Match: Mick Lyons (Summerhill)

The 1990 Meath Senior Football Championship is the 98th edition of the Meath GAA's premier club Gaelic football tournament for senior graded teams in County Meath, Ireland. The tournament consists of 14 teams, with the winner going on to represent Meath in the Leinster Senior Club Football Championship. The championship starts with a group stage and then progresses to a knock out stage.

This was St. Michael's first year ever as a senior club after claiming the 1989 Meath Intermediate Football Championship title.

For this season, former All-star winner Gerry McEntee transferred from Nobber to Summerhill. However, in the SFC final drawn game, he broke his wrist.

Navan O'Mahonys were the defending champions after they defeated Skryne in the previous years final, and they successfully defended their title to claim their 15th S.F.C. title (their 4th in a row) when beating Summerhill 1–11 to 0-5 after a replay in the final at Pairc Tailteann on 28 October 1990. Colm Ratty raised the Keegan Cup for O'Mahonys while Mick Lyons of Summerhill claimed the 'Man of the Match' award, becoming the second man to claim this accolade after losing the final. Joe Cassells also won a record 8th S.F.C. medal, although he was sent off in the replay.

No team was relegated from the S.F.C. this year.

== Team changes ==
The following teams have changed division since the 1989 championship season.

=== To S.F.C. ===
Promoted from I.F.C.

- St. Michael's - (Intermediate Champions)

=== From S.F.C. ===
Regraded to I.F.C.

- None

== Group stage ==
=== Group A ===
Team	Pld	W	L	D	PF	PA	PD	Pts
Walterstown	4	3	0	1	55	25	+30	7
Navan O'Mahonys	4	3	1	0	72	27	+45	6
Skryne	4	2	1	1	61	33	+28	5
Nobber	4	1	3	0	30	66	-33	2
Oldcastle	4	0	4	0	24	85	-61	0

Round 1

- Walterstown 1-13, 0-3 Nobber, Kells, 13/5/1990,
- Skryne 4-8, 0-4 Oldcastle, Dunderry, 6/5/1990,
- Navan O'Mahonys - Bye,

Round 2

- Navan O'Mahonys 4-18, 0-5 Oldcastle, Athboy, 13/5/1990,
- Skryne 1–7, 0-10 Walterstown, Pairc Tailteann, 13/5/1990,
- Nobber - Bye,

Round 3

- Navan O'Mahonys 1-22, 0-8 Nobber, Castletown, 26/5/1990,
- Walterstown 2-17, 1-4 Oldcastle, Kells, 27/5/1990,
- Skryne - Bye,

Round 4

- Navan O'Mahonys 0-12, 0-8 Skryne, Walterstown, 15/6/1990,
- Nobber 0-12, 0-8 Oldcastle, Kells, 16/6/1990,
- Walterstown - Bye,

Round 5

- Walterstown 0-6, 0-5 Navan O'Mahonys, Kells, 8/7/1990,
- Skryne 3-8, 0-7 Nobber, Seneschalstown, 8/7/1990,
- Oldcastle - Bye,

=== Group B ===
Team	Pld	W	L	D	PF	PA	PD	Pts
Seneschalstown	4	3	0	1	60	24	+36	7
Gaeil Colmcille	4	3	1	0	57	45	+12	6
Trim	4	2	1	1	36	29	+7	5
Slane	4	1	3	0	27	37	-10	2
St. Colmcille's	4	0	4	0	25	70	-45	0

Round 1

- Gaeil Colmcille 0-10, 1-6 Trim, Athboy, 6/5/1990,
- Slane 2-8, 0-11 St. Colmcille's, Donore, 12/5/1990,
- Seneschalstown - Bye,

Round 2

- Seneschalstown 4-6, 1-7 Gaeil Colmcille, Walterstown, 13/5/1990,
- Trim 2-10, 1-3 Slane, Pairc Tailteann, 19/5/1990,
- St. Colmcille's - Bye,

Round 3

- Seneschalstown 3-20, 0-3 St. Colmcille's, Donore, 22/5/1990,
- Gaeil Colmcille 0-10, 0-7 Slane, Walterstown, 26/5/1990,
- Trim - Bye,

Round 4

- Seneschalstown 1–10, 2-5 Trim, Dunderry, 26/6/1990,
- Gaeil Colmcille 3-18, 2-5 St. Colmcille's, 26/6/1990,
- Slane - Bye,

Round 5:

- Seneschalstown w/o, scr Slane,
- Trim w/o, scr St. Colmcille's,
- Gaeil Colmcille - Bye,

=== Group C ===
Team	Pld	W	L	D	PF	PA	PD	Pts
Summerhill	3	3	0	0	27*	12*	+15*	6
Castletown	3	2	1	0	33	26	+13	4
Moynalvey	3	1	2	0	31	34	-3	2
St. Michael's	3	0	3	0	10*	29*	-19*	0

Round 1:

- Summerhill 0-13, 0-5 Castletown, Dunderry, 13/5/1990,
- Moynalvey 1-13, 0-5 St. Michael's, Dunderry, 13/5/1990,

Round 2:

- Castletown 2-7, 0-5 St. Michael's, Kilmainhamwood, 20/5/1990,
- Summerhill 2-8, 1-4 Moynalvey, Trim, 21/5/1990,

Round 3:

- Summerhill w, l St. Michael's, Athboy, 16/6/1990,
- Castletown 2-9, 0-8 Moynalvey, Kilmessan, 8/7/1990,

== Knockout stages ==
The teams in the quarter-finals are the second placed teams from each group and the group C winner. The teams in the semi-finals are group A and B winners along with the quarter-final winners.

Quarter-Finals
Navan O'Mahonys	0-11
Castletown	0-6
Gaeil Colmcille	scr
Summerhill	w/o

Semi-Finals
Seneschalstown	0-6 R
Navan O'Mahonys	1-13 R
Walterstown	0-7
Summerhill	0-12

Final
Navan O'Mahonys	1-11 R
Summerhill	0-5 R

Quarter-Finals:

- Summerhill w/o, scr Gaeil Colmcille, *
- Navan O'Mahonys 0-11, 0-6 Castletown, Rathkenny, 3/8/1990,

Semi-Finals:

- Seneschalstown 0–12, 1-9 Navan O'Mahonys, Pairc Tailteann, 26/8/1990,
- Summerhill 0-12, 0-7 Walterstown, Pairc Tailteann, 26/8/1990,

Semi-Final Replay:

- Navan O'Mahonys 1-13, 0-6 Seneschalstown, Pairc Tailteann, 30/9/1990,

Final:

- Navan O'Mahonys 0–12, 3-3 Summerhill, Pairc Tailteann, 14/10/1990,

Final Replay:

- Navan O'Mahonys 1-11, 0-5 Summerhill, Pairc Tailteann, 28/10/1990,
- Gaeil Colmcille failed to fulfil their quarter-final fixture with Summerhill causing the game to be cancelled. At a County Board meeting on Wednesday 8 August, Gaeil Colmcille argued they didn't fulfil the fixture as four of their players were on holiday at the time and they felt they wouldn't do themselves or their spectators justice. The Kells side were then expelled from the championship.

== Leinster Senior Club Football Championship ==
Preliminary Round:

- ??? w, l Navan O'Mahonys,
