= Dunderry GAA =

Gaelic sports club in County Meath, Ireland

Dunderry
- Dún Doire
- Founded: 1890
- County: Meath
- Colours
- Grounds: Dunderry GAA Grounds

Playing kits
Standard colours

Senior Club Championships
	All Ireland	Leinster champions	Meath champions
Football:	0	0	1

Dunderry GAA Club is a Gaelic Athletic Association club in Dunderry, County Meath, Ireland. The club is affiliated to the Meath County Board and fields teams in both hurling and Gaelic football.

== History ==
Located in the village of Dunderry, approximately five miles (8 km) from the town of Navan, Dunderry GAA Club was founded in 1890. Gaelic football had been played in the area since the early years of the Gaelic Athletic Association, while hurling was first played in 1920. Dunderry had its first major success in 1934, when the club won the first of its two Meath JHC titles.

Gaelic football success arrived in terms of three Meath IFC title wins in 1944, 1947 and 1970. The club won a fourth such title in 1990, before claiming a Meath IHC title in 1991. Dunderry won its sole Meath SFC title in 1995, following a 1–11 to 0–10 win over Kilmainhamwood in the final. The 21st century saw the club claim further Meath IHC titles, in 2014 and 2022.

== Honours ==
- Meath Senior Football Championship (1): 1995
- Meath Intermediate Football Championship (4): 1944, 1947, 1970, 1990
- Meath Intermediate Hurling Championship (3): 1991, 2014, 2022
- Meath Junior A Hurling Championship (2): 1934, 1987

== Notable players ==
- Tommy Dowd: All-Ireland SFC-winner (1996, 1999)
