= Meath Intermediate Football Championship =

Annual Gaelic football competition

- Founded: 1927 –
- Trophy: Mattie McDonnell Cup
- Title holders: Duleek/Bellewstown (1st title)
- Most titles: Duleek (5 titles)
- Sponsors: Meade Potato and Co.

Meath Intermediate Football Championship is an annual Gaelic Athletic Association second-tier competition between Gaelic football clubs organised by Meath GAA. The winning club is promoted to the Meath Senior Football Championship. In the 2025 final, Kilbride defeated Castletown to win their second Intermediate championship and become a senior club for the first time since 1978. Each year, the final takes place in Pairc Tailteann, Navan. The winning club competes in the Leinster Intermediate Club Football Championship. The current (2025) champions are Kilbride.

== Qualification for subsequent competitions ==
=== Meath Intermediate Club Football Championship ===
The Meath IFC winner qualifies for the Leinster Intermediate Club Football Championship. It is the only team from County Meath to qualify for this competition. The Meath IFC winner may enter the Leinster Intermediate Club Football Championship at either the preliminary round or the quarter-final stage.

Meath IFC winning clubs won consecutive Leinster titles in the 2010s: Ratoath doing so in 2015 and St Colmcille's doing so in 2016, the latter with a stoppage time fee to secure a one-point win.

=== All-Ireland Intermediate Club Football Championship ===
The Meath IFC winner — by winning the Leinster Intermediate Club Football Championship — may qualify for the All-Ireland Intermediate Club Football Championship, at which it would enter at the __ stage, providing it hasn't been drawn to face the British champions in the quarter-finals. For example, 2021 winner Trim played in the All-Ireland final at Croke Park, as did 2016 winner St Colmcille's, also at GAA headquarters.

== History ==
Wolfe Tones went from the Meath Junior Football Championship through this competition and on to being Meath Senior Football Championship winners in the space of four seasons in the early 21st-century, featuring Meath player Cian Ward, whose emergence as one of Meath's "most exciting talents" coincided with this run, while 1996 All-Ireland Senior Football Championship-winning captain Tommy Dowd also joined the club around this time.

== Intermediate teams ==
In 2026, the 16 clubs competing in the Intermediate Football Championship included:

Club	Location	Finish in 2025	Founded	I.F.C titles	Last I.F.C title
Ballivor	Ballivor	Relegation Semi-Finalist	1929	4	2002
Bective	Bective	Relegation Semi-Finalist	1964	0	n/a
Blackhall Gaels	Batterstown & Kilcloon	Non-Qualifier	1995	2	2001
Castletown	Castletown-Kilpatrick	Runners-Up	1962	3	1976
Clann na nGael	Athboy & Ráth Chairn	2025 JFC Champions	2002	0	n/a
Drumbaragh Emmets	Drumbaragh, Kells	Quarter-Finalist	1939	0	n/a
Dunsany	Dunsany	Quarter-Finalist	1963	0	n/a
Duleek/Bellewstown	Duleek & Bellewstown	Non-Qualifier	1937	5	2005
Longwood	Longwood	Non-Qualifier	1904	2	2018
Meath Hill	Meath Hill	Relegated from 2025 SFC	1903	1	2024
Moynalvey	Moynalvey & Kiltale	Semi-Finalist	1934	2	2011
Navan O'Mahonys	Navan	Relegation Finalist	1948	2	2003
Oldcastle	Oldcastle	Quarter-Finalist	1884	2	2009
St Michael's	Carlanstown & Kilbeg	Semi-Finalist	1980	1	1989
St Patrick's	Julianstown & Stamullen	Quarter-Finalist	1950	3	2000
Walterstown	Walterstown & Johnstown	Non Qualifier	1902	1	1964

== Top winners ==
Clubs in bold still in existence as football clubs.

Club	Titles	Years won
Duleek	5	1939, 1955, 1966, 1978, 2005
**Ballivor**	4	1948, 1971, 1981, 2002
**Donaghmore/Ashbourne**	4	1938, 1950, 1959, 2007
**Dunderry**	4	1944, 1947, 1970, 1990
**Rathkenny**	3	1934, 2006, 2023
**Dunshaughlin**	3	1977, 1997, 2022
**Nobber**	3	1980, 2010, 2019
**Ballinlough**	3	1954, 1991, 2014
**St Patrick's**	3	1951, 1963, 2000
**Kilmainhamwood**	3	1965, 1982, 1994
**Slane**	3	1929, 1968, 1984
**Castletown**	3	1927, 1946, 1976
**Kilbride**	2	1962, 2025
**Trim**	2	1949, 2021
**Longwood**	2	1942, 2018
**St Colmcille's**	2	1988, 2016
**Gaeil Colmcille**	2	1986, 2013
**Moynalvey**	2	1983, 2011
**Oldcastle**	2	1987, 2009
**Navan O'Mahonys**	2	1956, 2003
**Blackhall Gaels**	2	1998, 2001
**Syddan**	2	1941, 1999
**Carnaross**	2	1957, 1993
**St. Peter's Dunboyne**	2	1952, 1992
Athboy	2	1960, 1979
Drumree	2	1961, 1969
**Seneschalstown**	2	1940, 1967
**Skryne**	2	1933, 1937
**Moynalty**	2	1931, 1936
Erin's Own	2	1932, 1935
**Duleek/Bellewstown**	1	2026
**Meath Hill**	1	2024
**Ballinabrackey**	1	2020
**Curraha**	1	2017
**Ratoath**	1	2015
**Na Fianna**	1	2012
**St Ultan's**	1	2008
**Wolfe Tones**	1	2004
**Cortown**	1	1996
**Simonstown Gaels**	1	1995
**St Michael's**	1	1989
Martry Harps	1	1985
**Moylagh**	1	1975
St John's	1	1974
Bohermeen	1	1973
**Summerhill**	1	1972
**Walterstown**	1	1964
St Mary's (Bettystown)	1	1958
**St Vincent's**	1	1953
Carlanstown	1	1945
Parnells	1	1943
Martry	1	1930
Ardcath	1	1928

== Roll of honour ==
Year	Winner	Score	Opponent	Score	Note
2026	Duleek/Bellewstown	2-17	Navan O'Mahonys	1-10	
2025	Kilbride	0-20	Castletown	1-16	
2024	Meath Hill	0-16	Navan O'Mahony's	0-14	After extra time
2023	Rathkenny	1-18	Duleek	2-14	
2022	Dunshaughlin	0-17	Duleek	0-07	
2021	Trim	3-12	Oldcastle	0-07	
2020	Ballinabrackey	0-16	Trim	1-12	
2019	Nobber	4-16	Trim	0-13	
2018	Longwood	0-11	Ballinlough	0-07	
2017	Curraha	1-17	St Michael's	1-07	
2016	St Colmcille's	0-12, 1-12 (R)	Dunderry	0-12, 1-06 (R)	
2015	Ratoath	1-15	Nobber	0-05	
2014	Ballinlough	1-12	Ballinabrackey	1-09	
2013	Gaeil Colmcille	0-18	Clann na nGael	0-05	
2012	Na Fianna	1-12	Trim	1-10	
2011	Moynalvey	0-15	Gaeil Colmcille	1-10	
2010	Nobber	3-12	Carnaross	0-07	
2009	Oldcastle	2-11	Kilmainhamwood	0-06	
2008	St Ultan's	1-12	Cortown	1-09	
2007	Donaghmore/Ashbourne	1-15	Castletown	1-11	
2006	Rathkenny	1-10	Drumconrath	2-06	
2005	Duleek	1-09, 2-07 (R)	Syddan	1-09, 2-06 (R)	
2004	Wolfe Tones	2-10	Duleek	1-12	
2003	Navan O'Mahony's	3-14	Carnaross	0-06	
2002	Ballivor	2-05	Navan O'Mahony's	0-10	
2001	Blackhall Gaels	1-10	Ballivor	0-12	
2000	St Patrick's	0-09	Ballivor	0-07	
1999	Syddan	2-11	St Patrick's	1-10	
1998	Blackhall Gaels	0-12	St Patrick's	1-08	
1997	Dunshaughlin	3-14	Duleek	1-06	
1996	Cortown	2-05	Duleek	0-08	
1995	Simonstown Gaels	0-16	Castletown	2-09	
1994	Kilmainhamwood	2-11	Simonstown Gaels	1-08	
1993	Carnaross	1-08	Kilmainhamwood	0-10	
1992	St. Peter's Dunboyne	0-08	St Patrick's	0-04	
1991	Ballinlough	1-09	St Patrick's	0-11	
1990	Dunderry	0-16	St. Peter's Dunboyne	1-07	
1989	St Michael's	0-11	Dunderry	0-09	
1988	St Colmcille's	1-03, 1-11 (R)	Dunderry	0-06, 2-07 (R)	
1987	Oldcastle	5-06	Dunderry	3-04	
1986	Gaeil Colmcille	1-06	Meath Hill	0-07	
1985	Martry Harps	1-05, 1-08 (R)	St Mary's Donore	1-05, 1-02 (R)	
1984	Slane	0-08	St Colmcille's	0-05	
1983	Moynalvey	1-08	St Mary's Donore	0-06	
1982	Kilmainhamwood	1-05	Martry Harps	0-07	
1981	Ballivor	2-08	Wolfe Tones	1-04	
1980	Nobber	1-08	Martry Harps	0-08	
1979	Martinstown/Athboy	2-05	Wolfe Tones	2-04	
1978	Duleek	0-09	Kilmainhamwood	1-05	
1977	Dunshaughlin	0-13	Nobber	0-06	
1976	Castletown	2-05	Kilmainhamwood	0-07	
1975	Moylagh	2-05	Dunshaughlin	0-09	
1974	St John's	2-03	St Vincent's	0-05	
1973	Bohermeen	0-13	Moylagh	1-07	
1972	Summerhill	3-07	Martry Harps	2-04	
1971	Ballivor	(R)	Moylagh	(R)	
1970	Dunderry	2-09	Flathouse	1-03	
1969	Drumree	2-06	Castletown	1-07	
1968	Slane	1-09	Bohermeen	1-07	
1967	Seneschalstown	0-11	Bohermeen	0-03	
1966	Duleek	5-07	Ballivor	2-07	
1965	Kilmainhamwood	1-06	Duleek	1-04	
1964	Walterstown	1-06	Kilmainhamwood	1-03	
1963	St Patrick's	1-06	Kells Harps	1-03	
1962	Kilbride	3-08	Walterstown	1-03	
1961	Drumree	2-07	Slane	1-03	
1960	Athboy	2-07	St Patrick's	1-03	
1959	Donaghmore	3-05	Kilmainhamwood	1-10	
1958	St Mary's, Bettystown	3-05	Fordstown	2-04	
1957	Carnaross	1-20	Duleek	0-05	
1956	Navan O'Mahony's 'B'	1-06, 3-06 (R)	Dunshaughlin	1-06, 0-05 (R)	
1955	Duleek	1-09	Slane	2-04	
1954	Ballinlough		Slane		Played on league basis. No final required.
1953	St Vincent's	2-07	Dunderry	1-03	
1952	St. Peter's, Dunboyne		Dunderry		Played on league basis. No final required.
1951	St Patrick's	0-07	Ballinlough	0-05	
1950	Donaghmore	2-09	Ballinabrackey	0-05	
1949	Trim				
1948	Ballivor				
1947	Dunderry				
1946	Castletown				
1945	Carlanstown				
1944	Dunderry				
1943	Parnells				
1942	Longwood	0-03	Carlanstown	0-01	
1941	Syddan		Flathouse		
1940	Seneschalstown		Syddan		
1939	Duleek				
1938	Donaghmore		Oldcastle		
1937	Skryne				
1936	Moynalty				
1935	Erin's Own				
1934	Rathkenny	1-02	Bohermeen	0-04	
1933	Skryne	3-03	Rathkenny	0-03	
1932	Erin's Own				
1931	Moynalty				
1930	Martry Harps				
1929	Slane	2-05 (R)	Oldcastle	1-02 (R)	
1928	Ardcath				
1927	Castletown				
