= 2010 Meath Intermediate Football Championship =

Meath I.F.C.
- Season: 2010
- Champions: Nobber; 2nd Intermediate Football Championship Titile
- Promoted: Nobber
- Relegated: Kilmainhamwood
- Leinster ICFC: Nobber (Final) Ballymore Eustace 0-12 Nobber 0-10
- All Ireland ICFC: N/A
- Matches: 38

The 2010 Meath Intermediate Football Championship is the 84th edition of the Meath GAA's premier club Gaelic football tournament for intermediate graded teams in County Meath, Ireland. The tournament consists of 15 teams, with the winner going on to represent Meath in the Leinster Intermediate Club Football Championship. The championship starts with a group stage and then progresses to a knock out stage.

No team was relegated from the Senior grade in 2009.

On 3 October 2010, Nobber claimed their 2nd Intermediate championship title when they defeated Carnaross 3-12 to 0-7, succeeding Oldcastle as Intermediate champions.

Kilmainhamwood were relegated from this grade in 2010, after 2 years as an Intermediate club.

== Team changes ==
The following teams have changed division since the 2009 championship season.

=== From I.F.C. ===
Promoted to S.F.C.

- Oldcastle - (Intermediate Champions)

Relegated to 2010 J.A.F.C.

- Drumconrath

=== To I.F.C. ===
Relegted from S.F.C.

- n/a

Promoted from 2009 J.A.F.C.

- Longwood - (Junior 'A' Champions)

== Group stage ==
In the group stage, there are three groups called Group A, B and C. Two teams from each group go through to finals of the tournament. The three teams that finish last in each group go to the relegation play off.

=== Group A ===
Team	Pld	W	L	D	PF	PA	PD	Pts
Nobber	4	2	0	2	62	50	+12	6
Carnaross	4	2	1	1	55	43	+12	5
St Colmcilles	4	2	1	1	67	62	+5	5
Moynalvey	4	2	2	0	53	65	-12	4
Kilmainhamwood	4	0	4	0	46	63	-17	0

Round 1:

- Moynalvey 3-6, 4-15 St. Colmcille's, Ashbourne, 16/4/2010,
- Kilmainhamwood 0-10, 1-14 Nobber, Meath Hill, 17/4/2010,
- Carnaross - Bye,

Round 2:

- Moynalvey 1-9, 1-17 Nobber, Simonstown, 30/4/2010,
- Carnaross 2-14, 1-8 St. Colmcille's, Pairc Tailteann, 1/5/2010,
- Kilmainhamwood - Bye,

Round 3:

- Nobber 0-14, 1-11 St. Colmcille's, Rathkenny, 28/5/2010,
- Carnaross 0-15, 0-8 Kilmainhamwood, Kells, 30/5/2010,
- Moynalvey - Bye,

Round 4:

- Carnaross 0-6, 1-7 Moynalvey, Bective, 16/7/2010,
- Kilmainhamwood 1-10, 1-12 St. Colmcille's, Kilberry, 16/7/2010,
- Nobber - Bye,

Round 5:

- Carnaross 1-11, 1-11 Nobber, Kells, 6/8/2010,
- Kilmainhamwood 1-12, 1-13 Moynalvey, Kilberry, 8/8/2010,
- St. Colmcille's - Bye,

=== Group B ===
Team	Pld	W	L	D	PF	PA	PD	Pts
St. Michaels	4	3	1	0	66	49	+17	6
Longwood	4	3	1	0	52	45	+7	6
Na Fianna	4	2	1	1	54	53	+1	5
Syddan	4	1	3	0	46	55	-9	2
Castletown	4	0	3	1	51	67	-16	1

Round 1:

- Syddan 0-6, 2-10 Longwood, Bective, 18/4/2010,
- Castletown 0-12, 1-9 Na Fianna, Dunderry, 18/4/2010,
- St. Michael's - Bye,

Round 2:

- Castletown 1-7, 0-16 Longwood, Pairc Tailteann, 1/5/2010,
- St Michael's 1-13, 1-16 Na Fianna, Athboy, 2/5/2010,
- Syddan - Bye,

Round 3:

- St Michael's 0-11, 0-10 Syddan, Drumconrath, 28/5/2010,
- Longwood 0-14, 1-7 Na Fianna, Trim, 29/5/2010,
- Castletown - Bye,

Round 4:

- Syddan 1-8, 2-7 Na Fianna, Walterstown, 16/7/2010,
- St. Michael's 2-14, 1-11 Castletown, Rathkenny, 17/7/2010,
- Longwood - Bye,

Round 5:

- Syddan 2-13, 2-9 Castletown, Drumconrath, 7/8/2010,
- St. Michael's 1-16, 0-6 Longwood, Athboy, 8/8/2010,
- Na Fianna - Bye,

=== Group C ===
Team	Pld	W	L	D	PF	PA	PD	Pts
Gaeil Colmcille	4	3	1	0	42	32	+10	6
Dunderry	4	2	0	2	41	39	+2	6
Ballinlough	4	2	1	1	47	42	+5	5
Cortown	4	1	3	0	48	51	-3	2
Clann na nGael	4	0	3	1	38	52	-14	1

Round 1:

- Cortown 0-14, 2-10 Ballinlough, Carnaross, 18/4/2010,
- Clann na nGael 0-6, 2-7 Gaeil Colmcille, Kilskyre, 18/4/2010,
- Dunderry - Bye,

Round 2:

- Dunderry 0-11, 0-11 Ballinlough, Carlanstown, 30/4/2010,
- Cortown 1-5, 1-8 Gaeil Colmcille, Carnaross, 30/4/2010,
- Clann na nGael - Bye,

Round 3:

- Gaeil Colmcille 1-6, 0-8 Ballinlough, Oldcastle, 28/5/2010,
- Dunderry 0-10, 1-7 Clann na nGael, Bohermeen, 30/5/2010,
- Cortown - Bye,

Round 4:

- Clann na nGael 0-8, 1-9 Ballinlough, Bohermeen, 15/7/2010,
- Dunderry 1-7, 0-9 Cortown, Athboy, 16/7/2010,
- Gaeil Colmcille - Bye,

Round 5:

- Clann na nGael 0-14, 2-11 Cortown, Kilskyre, 7/8/2010,
- Dunderry 1-7, 0-9 Gaeil Colmcille, Carnaross, 8/8/2010,
- Ballinlough - Bye,

== Knock-out Stage ==
=== Relegation Play Off ===
Team	Pld	W	L	D	PF	PA	PD	Pts
Castletown	2	1	1	0	33	29	+4	2
Clann na nGael	2	1	1	0	29	29	+0	2
Kilmainhamwood	2	1	1	0	30	34	-4	2

Game 1: Kilmainhamwood 3-10, 1-12 Castletown, Nobber, 22/8/2010,

Game 2: Castletown 4-6, 0-10 Clann na nGael, Moynalty, 10/9/2010,

Game 3: Kilmainhamwood 1-8, 1-16 Clann na nGael, Castletown, 18/9/2010.

=== Finals ===
The teams in the quarter-finals are the second placed teams in each group and the worst finished group winner. The two best finished winners in the groups were Nobber and St. Michael's who automatically qualify for the semi-finals.

Quarter-Finals
Dunderry	0-10
Longwood	0-5
Gaeil Colmcille	1-9
Carnaross	2-8

Semi-Finals
Nobber	0-12
Dunderry	0-8
St. Michaels	0-7
Carnaross	0-9

Final
Nobber	3-12
Carnaross	0-7

Quarter-Final

- Dunderry 0-10, 0-5 Longwood, Trim, 22/8/2010,
- Gaeil Colmcille 1-9, 2-8 Carnaross, Pairc Tailteann, 21/8/2010

Semi-Final

- Nobber 0-12 , 0-8 Dunderry, Pairc Tailteann, 4/9/2010,
- St. Michael's 0-7, 0-9 Carnaross, Pairc Tailteann, 4/9/2010,

Final

- Nobber 3-12, 0-7 Carnaross, Pairc Tailteann, 3/10/2010,
