= 1965 Meath Intermediate Football Championship =

Meath I.F.C.
- Season: 1965
- Champions: Kilmainhamwood; 1st Intermediate Football Championship title
- Relegated: Athboy; Carlanstown; Drumconrath; Gaeil Colmcille 'B'

The 1965 Meath Intermediate Football Championship is the 39th edition of the Meath GAA's premier club Gaelic football tournament for intermediate graded teams in County Meath, Ireland. The tournament consists of 16 teams. The championship starts with a group stage and then progresses to a knock out stage.

No team was regraded from the 1964 S.F.C. Martry, Enfield and Seneschalstown were promoted after claiming the 1964 Meath Junior Football Championship title, runners-up spot and Junior 'A' Divisional runners-up spot respectively. Gaeil Colmcille 'B's application to be promoted (only their 2nd season in existence) was also granted by the Co. Board.

At the end of the season Athboy, Carlanstown, Drumconrath, Gaeil Colmcille 'B' applied to be regraded to the 1966 J.F.C.

On 10 October 1966, Kilmainhamwood claimed their 1st Intermediate championship title when they defeated Duleek 1–6 to 1–4 in the final at Pairc Tailteann.

== Team changes ==
The following teams have changed division since the 1964 championship season.

=== From I.F.C. ===
Promoted to 1965 S.F.C.

- Walterstown - (Intermediate Champions)

Relegated to 1965 J.A.F.C.

- Donaghmore
- Navan O'Mahonys 'B'

=== To I.F.C. ===
Regraded from 1964 S.F.C.

- None

Promoted from 1964 J.A.F.C. & J.B.F.C.

- Martry - (Junior & Junior 'B' Divisional Champions)
- Enfield - (Junior Runners-Up & Junior 'A' Divisional Champions)
- Seneschalstown - (Junior 'A' Divisional Runners-Up)
- Gaeil Colmcille 'B' - (Application to be promoted approved by the Co. Board)

== Group stage ==
There are 4 groups called Group A, B, C and D. The top finisher in each group will qualify for the Semi-Finals. Many results were unavailable in the Meath Chronicle.

=== Group A ===
Team	Pld	W	L	D	PF	PA	PD	Pts
Kilmainhamwood	3	3	0	0	0	0	+0	6
Carlanstown	2	1	1	0	0	0	+0	2
Martry	2	0	2	0	0	0	+0	0
Gaeil Colmcille 'B'	1	0	1	0	0	0	+0	0

Round 1:

- Carlanstown 3-2, 2-4 Martry, Kells, 11/4/1965,
- Kilmainhamwood 2-7, 1-3 Gaeil Colmcille 'B', Kilberry, 11/7/1965,

Round 2:

- Kilmainhamwood 2-3, 0-5 Carlanstown, Kells, 1/8/1965,
- Martry -vs- Gaeil Colmcille 'B', Pairc Tailteann, 1/8/1965,

Round 3:

- Carlanstown -vs- Gaeil Colmcille 'B', Martry, 8/8/1965,
- Kilmainhamwood 0-10, 0-3 Martry, Kells, 29/8/1965,

=== Group B ===
Team	Pld	W	L	D	PF	PA	PD	Pts
Slane	2	2	0	0	0	0	+0	4
Rathkenny	1	1	0	0	0	0	+0	2
Syddan	2	1	1	0	0	0	+0	2
Drumconrath	3	0	3	0	0	0	+0	0

Round 1:

- Slane w, l Drumconrath, Castletown, 11/4/1965,
- Syddan -vs- Rathkenny, Castletown, 11/4/1965,

Round 2:

- Slane w, l Syddan, Kilberry, 2/5/1965,
- Rathkenny 5-7, 2-1 Drumconrath, Kilberry, 16/5/1965,

Round 3:

- Slane -vs- Rathkenny, Pairc Tailteann, 18/7/1965,
- Syddan w/o, scr Drumconrath,

=== Group C ===
Team	Pld	W	L	D	PF	PA	PD	Pts
Ballivor	1	1	0	0	0	0	+0	2
Ballinabrackey	1	0	1	0	0	0	+0	0
Enfield	1	0	0	0	0	0	+0	0
Athboy	0	0	0	0	0	0	+0	0

Round 1:

- Ballinabrackey -vs- Enfield, Rathmolyon, 11/4/1965,
- Ballivor -vs- Athboy,

Round 2:

- Ballivor -vs- Enfield, Trim, 1/8/1965,
- Ballinabrackey -vs- Athboy, Trim, 1/8/1965,

Round 3:

- Ballivor w, l Ballinabrackey, Enfield, 22/8/1965,
- Athboy -vs- Enfield,

=== Group D ===
Team	Pld	W	L	D	PF	PA	PD	Pts
Duleek	3	2	0	1	0	0	+0	5
Seneschalstown	2	1	0	1	0	0	+0	3
Salesian College Warrenstown	2	0	2	0	0	0	+0	0
St. Peter's Dunboyne	1	0	1	0	0	0	+0	0

Round 1:

- Seneschalstown w, l Warrenstown, Skryne, 23/5/1965,
- Duleek w, l St. Peter's Dunboyne, Skryne, 23/6/1965,

Round 2:

- Seneschalstown -vs- St. Peter's Dunboyne, Kilmessan, 1/8/1965,
- Duleek w, l Warrenstown,

Round 3:

- Seneschalstown 1–5, 0-8 Duleek, Pairc Tailteann, 8/8/1965,
- Warrenstown -vs- St. Peter's Dunboyne,

== Knock-out Stages ==
The teams in the Semi-Finals are the first and second placed teams from each group.

Semi-Finals
Kilmainhamwood	3-3
Slane	1-6
Duleek	0-10
Seneschalstown	1-5

Final
Kilmainhamwood	1-6
Duleek	1-4

Semi-Final:

- Duleek 0-10, 1-6 Slane, Pairc Tailteann, 22/8/1965,
- Kilmainhamwood 3-3, 1-6 Ballivor, Kells, 12/9/1965,

Final:

- Kilmainhamwood 1-6, 1-4 Duleek, Pairc Tailteann, 10/10/1965,
