= 1969 Meath Intermediate Football Championship =

Meath I.F.C.
- Season: 1969
- Champions: Drumree; 2nd Intermediate Football Championship title
- Relegated: Athboy; Longwood

The 1969 Meath Intermediate Football Championship is the 43rd edition of the Meath GAA's premier club Gaelic football tournament for intermediate graded teams in County Meath, Ireland. The tournament consists of 22 teams. The championship starts with a group stage and then progresses to a knock out stage.

Kilmainhamwood were regraded from the S.F.C. the previous year.

This year marked St. Mary's first year in existence as a result of the amalgamation of Junior 'A' clubs Donore and Lougher.

Flathouse and Moylagh were promoted after claiming the 1968 Meath Junior Football Championship title and Junior 'A' Divisional runners-up spot respectively. Gibbstown were also promoted after winning the Junior 'B' (known then as Division II) Championship and losing to Flathouse in the subsequent county Junior final.

At the end of the season, Athboy and Longwood applied to be regraded to the 1970 J.F.C.

On 5 October 1969, Drumree claimed their 2nd Intermediate championship title when they defeated Castletown 2-6 to 1-7 in the final in Pairc Tailteann, and thus returned the top flight of Meath club football.

== Team changes ==
The following teams have changed division since the 1968 championship season.

=== From I.F.C. ===
Promoted to S.F.C.

- Slane - (Intermediate Champions)

Relegated to 1969 J.A.F.C.

- United Gaels

=== To I.F.C. ===
Regraded from S.F.C.

- Kilmainhamwood

Promoted from 1968 J.A.F.C. & J.B.F.C.

- Flathouse - (Junior Champions)
- Moylagh - (Junior 'A' Divisional Runners-Up)
- Gibbstown - (Junior 'B' [or Division II] Champions)
- St. Mary's - (Amalgamation of Junior clubs Donore and Lougher)
- Bellewstown St. Theresa's (Junior 'A' Divisional Semi-Finalists)

== Group stage ==
There are 4 groups called Group A, B, C and D. The top finisher in each group will qualify for the Semi-Finals. Many results were unavailable.

=== Group A ===
Team	Pld	W	L	D	PF	PA	PD	Pts
Martry	1	1	0	0	0	0	+0	2
Dunderry	2	1	1	0	0	0	+0	2
Moylagh	3	1	2	0	0	0	+0	2
Bohermeen	1	1	0	0	0	0	+0	2
Kilallon	1	0	1	0	0	0	+0	0
Gibbstown	0	0	0	0	0	0	+0	0

Round 1:

- Kilallon v Dunderry, Athboy, 4/5/1969,
- Bohermeen v Martry, Athboy, 4/5/1969,
- Moylagh v Gibbstown,

Round 2:

- Martry v Kilallon,
- Dunderry v Gibbstown,
- Bohermeen 0-17, 1-4 Moylagh, Kells, 13/7/1969,

Round 3:

- Kilallon v Gibbstown, Ballinlough, 1/6/1969,
- Bohermeen v Dunderry,
- Martry v Moylagh, Martry, 3/8/1969,

Round 4:

- Martry 2-6, 0-7 Dunderry, Athboy, 27/7/1969,
- Moylagh w/o, scr Kilallon, Athboy, 20/7/1969,
- Bohermeen v Gibbstown,

Round 5:

- Bohermeen v Kilallon, Athboy, 18/5/1969,
- Dunderry 1-7, 2-2 Moylagh, Athboy, 1/6/1969,
- Martry v Gibbstown.

=== Group B ===
Team	Pld	W	L	D	PF	PA	PD	Pts
Castletown	0	0	0	0	0	0	+0	0
Syddan	1	1	0	0	0	0	+0	2
Rathkenny	0	0	0	0	0	0	+0	0
St. Mary's	1	0	1	0	0	0	+0	0
Salesian College Warrenstown	0	0	0	0	0	0	+0	0
Bellewstown St. Theresa's	0	0	0	0	0	0	+0	0

Round 1:

- Castletown v St. Mary's, Seneschalstown, 4/5/1969,
- Syddan v Bellewstown, Seneschalstown, 4/5/1969,
- Rathkenny v Warrenstown, Seneschalstown, 4/5/1969,

Round 2:

- Castletown v Bellewstown, Seneschalstown, 18/5/1969,
- St. Mary's v Warrenstown, Seneschalstown, 18/5/1969,
- Syddan v Rathkenny, Gibbstown, 18/5/1969,

Round 3:

- Castletown v Warrenstown, Seneschalstown, 15/6/1969,
- Syddan 1-13, 2-1 St. Mary's, Pairc Tailteann, 29/6/1969,
- Rathkenny v Bellewstown, Duleek, 29/6/1969,

Round 4:

- St. Mary's v Bellewstown, Duleek, 13/7/1969,
- Castletown v Rathkenny, Gibbstown, 13/7/1969,
- Syddan v Warrenstown,

Round 5:

- Castletown v Syddan, Pairc Tailteann, 27/7/1969,
- Rathkenny v St. Mary's,
- Bellewstown v Warrenstown,

=== Group C ===
Team	Pld	W	L	D	PF	PA	PD	Pts
Ballivor	4	4	0	0	0	0	+0	8
Summerhill	4	3	1	0	0	0	+0	6
Enfield	4	2	2	0	0	0	+0	4
Athboy	3	0	3	0	0	0	+0	0
Longwood	3	0	3	0	0	0	+0	0

Round 1:

- Ballivor 0-10, 0-7 Summerhill, Trim, 4/5/1969,
- Enfield w, l Athboy, Trim, 4/5/1969,
- Longwood - Bye,

Round 2:

- Ballivor w, l Longwood,
- Summerhill w, l Enfield,
- Athboy - Bye,

Round 3:

- Ballivor 2-8, 0-2 Enfield, Athboy, 10/8/1969,
- Athboy v Longwood,
- Summerhill - Bye,

Round 4:

- Ballivor 3-11, 0-9 Athboy, Trim, 27/7/1969,
- Summerhill 0-11, 1-7 Longwood, Enfield, 27/7/1969,
- Enfield - Bye,

Round 5:

- Enfield w, l Longwood, Trim, 18/5/1969,
- Summerhill 3-8, 1-5 Athboy, Trim, 13/7/1969,
- Ballivor - Bye,

=== Group D ===
Team	Pld	W	L	D	PF	PA	PD	Pts
Drumree	4	3	0	1	0	0	+0	7
St. Peter's Dunboyne	4	3	1	0	0	0	+0	6
Flathouse	3	1	1	1	0	0	+0	3
Dunshaughlin	3	0	3	0	0	0	+0	0
Kilmainhamwood	2	0	2	0	0	0	+0	0

Round 1:

- Drumree d, d Flathouse, Trim, 4/5/1969,
- St. Peter's Dunboyne w, l Kilmainhamwood, Trim, 4/5/1969,
- Dunshaughlin - Bye,

Round 2:

- Drumree +6, -6 Dunshaughlin, Kilmessan, 1/6/1969,
- St. Peter's Dunboyne +5, -5 Flathouse, Dunshaughlin, 29/6/1969,
- Kilmainhamwood - Bye,

Round 3:

- Dunshaughlin v Kilmainhamwood, Kilmessan, 29/6/1969,
- Drumree w, l St. Peter's Dunboyne, Kilcloon, 27/7/1969,
- Flathouse - Bye,

Round 4:

- Flathouse w, l Dunshaughlin, Kells, 13/71969,
- Drumree w, l Kilmainhamwood, Skryne, 10/8/1969,
- St. Peter's Dunboyne - Bye,

Round 5:

- St. Peter's Dunboyne w, l Dunshaughlin,
- Kilmainhamwood v Flathouse,
- Drumree - Bye,

== Knock-out Stages ==
The teams in the Semi-Finals are the first and second placed teams from each group.

Semi-Finals
Martry	0-4
Drumree	1-7
Castletown	2-5
Ballivor	1-7

Final
Drumree	2-6
Castletown	1-7

Semi-Final:

- Drumree 1-7, 0-4 Martry, Trim, 24/8/1969,
- Castletown 2-5, 1-7 Ballivor, Kells, 14/9/1969,

Final:

- Drumree 2-6, 1-7 Castletown, Pairc Tailteann, 5/10/1969,
