= Ballinlough, County Meath =

Village in County Meath, Ireland

Coordinates: 53.7354°N 7.0342°W

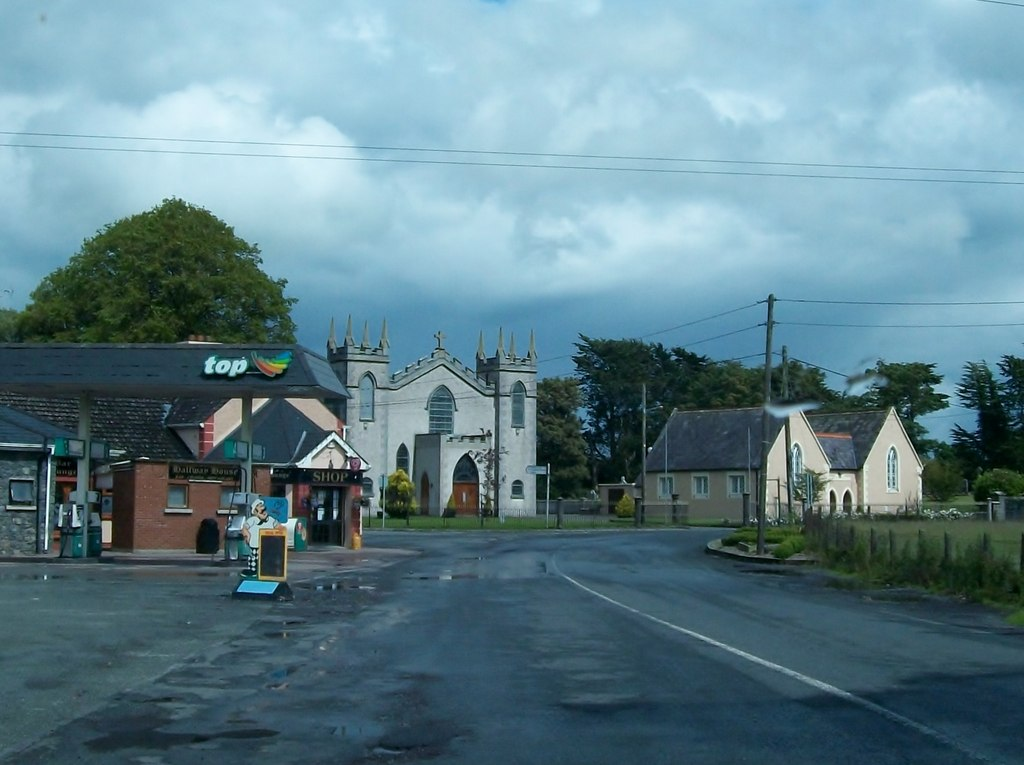
Church, petrol station and (former) school building in Ballinlough

Ballinlough (Irish: Baile an Locha) is a small village and electoral division in County Meath, Ireland. The area, which includes the townlands of Ballinlough Big and Ballinlough Little, is within the historical barony of Upper Kells. As of the 2022 census, Ballinlough electoral division had a population of 220 people. 10 kilometres (6 mi) east of Kells, Ballinlough lies on the R163 road.

== History ==
Evidence of ancient settlement in the area includes a number of ringfort and barrow sites in the townlands of Ballinlough Big, Ballinlough Little and Smithstown. The local Catholic church, the Church of the Assumption, was built in 1829. The adjoining former school building, now in use as a community hall, was built c. 1850.

== Amenities and sport ==
In addition to the Catholic church, Ballinlough has a pub, petrol station and shop. The local national (primary) school is Ballinlough National School.

The Gaelic Athletic Association (GAA) club in the area, Ballinlough GFC, has won the Meath Intermediate Football Championship on several occasions, including in 1991 and 2014.

== People ==
- Peadar Byrne, Gaelic footballer
- Matthew O'Reilly, politician
