= Meath Hill GFC =

Gaelic football club in County Meath

St Brigid's, Meath Hill
- CLG Naomh Bríd, Cnoc na Mí
- Founded: 1903
- County: Meath
- Colours: Blue and white
- Coordinates: 53°53′17″N 6°42′50″W

Playing kits
Standard colours

St. Brigid's, Meath Hill Gaelic Football Club is a Gaelic football club based in northern County Meath, Ireland.

== History ==
Meath Hill was founded in 1903 and played Castletown in the semi-final of the Meath Senior Football Championship.

During some years of high emigration when the club was unable to field a team due to a lack of available players, many of the players played with North Meath Gaels. In 1972 a pitch was developed beside Ballyhoe Lake. The club moved to its current home in 1992. Meath Hill won a first Meath IFC in 2024.

== Honours ==
=== Gaelic football ===
- Meath Intermediate Football Championship (1): 2024
- Meath Junior A Football Championship (2): 1942, 1980,2017.
- Meath Junior D Football Championship (1): 2012
