= 2014 Meath Senior Football Championship =

Meath S.F.C.
- Season: 2014
- Champions: Navan O'Mahonys; 19th Senior Championship Title
- Relegated: Oldcastle
- Leinster SCFC: Navan O'Mahonys (Quarter-Final) Rhode 4-10 Navan O'Mahonys 0-13,
- All Ireland SCFC: n/a
- Winning Captain: Niall McKeigue (Navan O'Mahonys)
- Man of the Match: Jake Regan (Navan O'Mahonys)
- Matches: 55

The 2014 Meath Senior Football Championship is the 122nd edition of the Meath GAA's premier club Gaelic football tournament for senior graded teams in County Meath, Ireland. The tournament consists of 18 teams, with the winner going on to represent Meath in the Leinster Senior Club Football Championship. The championship starts with a group stage and then progresses to a knock out stage.

Summerhill were the defending champions after they defeated Na Fianna in the previous years final, however they lost their crown when losing to Wolfe Tones at the quarter-final stage.

This was Gaeil Colmcille's first period in the senior grade in 9 years since relegation in 2004 after claiming the 2013 Meath Intermediate Football Championship title.

The draw for the group stages of the championship were made on 10 February 2014 with the games commencing on the weekend of 11 April 2014.

This year saw the 8th "Navan El Classico" take place in the SFC as Simonstown Gaels defeated Navan O'Mahonys in the group stage, leaving their overall head-to-head score as 5-3 in favour of O'Mahonys.

On 21 October 2014, Navan O'Mahonys claimed their 19th Senior Championship title, when defeating Donaghmore/Ashbourne 2-11 to 2-9 in Pairc Tailteann, Navan. Niall McKeigue raised the Keegan Cup for O'Mahonys while Jake Regan claimed the 'Man of the Match' award.

Oldcastle were relegated to Intermediate after 5 years as a Senior club.

== Team changes ==
The following teams have changed division since the 2013 championship season.

=== To S.F.C. ===
Promoted from I.F.C.

- Gaeil Colmcille - (Intermediate Champions)

=== From S.F.C. ===
Relegated to I.F.C.

- Nobber

== Participating teams ==
The teams taking part in the 2014 Meath Senior Football Championship are:

Club	Location	2013 Championship Position	2014 Championship Position
Blackhall Gaels	Batterstown	Non Qualifier	Non Qualifier
Donaghmore/Ashbourne	Ashbourne	Non Qualifier	Finalists
Duleek/Bellewstown	Duleek	Non Qualifier	Quarter-Finalist
Dunshaughlin	Dunshaughlin	Relegation Playoff	Non Qualifier
Gaeil Colmcille	Kells	Intermediate Champions	Non Qualifier
Moynalvey	Moynalvey	Quarter-Finalist	Non Qualifier
Na Fianna	Enfield	Finalists	Semi-finalist
Navan O'Mahonys	Navan	Quarter-finalist	Champions
Oldcastle	Oldcastle	Relegation Playoff	Relegated
Rathkenny	Rathkenny	Semi-finalist	Relegation Playoff
Seneschalstown	Kentstown	Quarter-finalist	Preliminary Quarter-Finalist
Simonstown Gaels	Navan	Non Qualifier	Quarter-Finalist
Skryne	Skryne	Quarter-Finalist	Quarter-Finalist
St Patricks	Stamullen	Non Qualifier	Non Qualifier
St Peters Dunboyne	Dunboyne	Preliminary Quarter-Finalist	Non Qualifier
Summerhill	Summerhill	Champions	Quarter-Finalist
Walterstown	Navan	Non Qualifier	Relegation Playoff
Wolfe Tones	Kilberry	Semi-Finalist	Semi-Finalist

== Group stage ==
There are 3 groups called Group A, B and C. The 2 top finishers in each group and the third place finisher in Group A will qualify for the quarter-finals. The third placed teams in Group B and C will qualify for a Preliminary Quarter-final, with the winner earning a place in last eight. The bottom finishers of each group will qualify for the Relegation Play Off. The draw for the group stages of the championship were made on 10 February 2014 with the games commencing on the weekend of 11 April 2014.

=== Group A ===
Team	Pld	W	L	D	PF	PA	PD	Pts
Wolfe Tones	5	5	0	0	98	57	+41	10
Skryne	5	4	1	0	80	66	+14	8
Duleek/Bellewstown	5	3	2	0	78	67	+11	6
St. Peter's Dunboyne	5	2	3	0	75	67	+8	4
Blackhall Gaels	5	1	4	0	62	80	-18	2
Oldcastle	5	0	5	0	53	109	-56	0

Round 1

- Duleek/Bellewstown 1-14, 1-12 St. Peter's Dunboyne, Ashbourne, 12/4/2014,
- Blackhall Gaels 0-11, 0-8 Oldcastle, Trim, 12/4/2014,
- Wolfe Tones 3-8, 0-10 Skryne, Pairc Tailteann, 13/4/2014,

Round 2

- St. Peter's Dunboyne 0-12, 0-10 Blackhall Gaels, Ashbourne, 19/4/2014,
- Skryne 2-11, 0-14 Duleek/Bellewstown, Stamullen, 26/4/2014,
- Oldcastle 1-14, 6-15 Wolfe Tones, Pairc Tailteann, 27/4/2014,

Round 3

- Skryne 3-13, 1-16 Blackhall Gaels, Dunshaughlin, 16/5/2014,
- Duleek/Bellewstown 0-11, 0-12 Wolfe Tones, Rathkenny, 23/5/2014,
- St. Peter's Dunboyne 4-16, 2-6 Oldcastle, Kilberry, 24/5/2014,

Round 4

- Oldcastle 0-4, 1-15 Skryne, Kilmainham, 15/8/2014,
- Blackhall Gaels 1-8, 3-8 Duleek/Bellewstown, Ashbourne, 16/8/2014,
- Wolfe Tones 1-12, 0-8 St. Peter's Dunboyne, Pairc Tailteann, 16/8/2014,

Round 5

- Wolfe Tones 3-12, 0-11 Blackhall Gaels, Pairc Tailteann, 31/8/2014,
- Skryne 1-10, 0-12 St. Peter's Dunboyne, Trim, 31/8/2014,
- Duleek/Bellewstown 0-19, 0-12 Oldcastle, Simonstown, 31/8/2014,

=== Group B ===
Team	Pld	W	L	D	PF	PA	PD	Pts
Simonstown Gaels	5	4	0	1	97	67	+30	9
Navan O'Mahonys	5	3	1	1	100	45	+55	7
Seneschalstown	5	2	2	1	80	86	-6	5
Gaeil Colmcille	5	1	3	1	65	88	-23	3
Dunshaughlin	5	1	3	1	72	97	-25	3
Walterstown	5	1	3	1	59	90	-31	3

Round 1

- Gaeil Colmcille 4-7, 1-15 Dunshaughlin, Skryne, 11/4/2014,
- Navan O'Mahonys 3-14, 0-8 Seneschalstown, Pairc Tailteann, 12/4/2014,
- Walterstown 0-8, 1-18 Simonstown Gaels, Pairc Tailteann, 13/4/2014,

Round 2

- Dunshaughlin 0-6, 3-22 Navan O'Mahonys, Pairc Tailteann, 19/4/2014,
- Simonstown Gaels 3-12, 1-12 Gaeil Colmcille, Pairc Tailteann, 25/4/2014,
- Seneschalstown 2-12, 3-9 Walterstown, Pairc Tailteann, 26/4/2014,

Round 3

- Dunshaughlin 2-5, 1-11 Seneschalstown, Dunsany, 18/5/2014,
- Simonstown Gaels 1-11, 1-9 Navan O'Mahonys, Trim, 23/5/2014,
- Gaeil Colmcille 0-9, 1-9 Walterstown, Castletown, 25/5/2014,

Round 4

- Seneschalstown 1-10, 3-13 Simonstown Gaels, Pairc Tailteann, 17/8/2014,
- Navan O'Mahonys 0-10, 0-10 Gaeil Comlcille, Kilmainhamwood, 17/8/2014,
- Walterstown 0-14, 3-9 Dunshaughlin, Skryne, 17/8/2014,

Round 5

- Simonstown Gaels 2-13, 3-10 Dunshaughlin, Ashbourne, 29/8/2014,
- Walterstown 0-7, 3-15 Navan O'Mahonys, Simonstown, 29/8/2014,
- Gaeil Colmcille 2-6, 4-15 Seneschalstown, Pairc Tailteann, 29/8/2014,

=== Group C ===
Team	Pld	W	L	D	PF	PA	PD	Pts
Donaghmore/Ashbourne	5	5	0	0	76	59	+17	10
Na Fianna	5	2	1	2	83	76	+7	6
Summerhill	5	2	2	1	74	70	+4	5
St. Patrick's	5	1	2	2	65	71	-6	4
Moynalvey	5	1	3	1	71	88	-17	3
Rathkenny	5	1	4	0	66	71	-5	2

Round 1

- Na Fianna 5-12, 2-12 Summerhill, Pairc Tailteann, 11/4/2014,
- Donaghmore/Ashbourne 1-13, 0-10 Moynalvey, Dunsany, 13/4/2014,
- Rathkenny 3-6, 0-5 St. Patrick's, Seneschalstown, 13/4/2014,

Round 2

- Moynalvey 1-15, 2-8 Rathkenny, Pairc Tailteann, 20/4/2014,
- Summerhill 0-8, 1-9 Donaghmore/Ashbourne, Trim, 26/4/2014,
- St. Patrick's 3-6, 2-9 Na Fianna, Ashbourne, 27/4/2014,

Round 3

- Moynalvey 2-8, 1-18 St. Patrick's, Walterstown, 18/5/2014,
- Donaghmore/Ashbourne 0-14, 1-8 Na Fianna, Trim, 24/5/2014,
- Summerhill 2-12, 0-9 Rathkenny, Kilberry, 24/5/2014,

Round 4

- St. Patrick's 0-10, 1-7 Summerhill, Dunshaughlin, 16/8/2014,
- Rathkenny 2-10, 2-11 Donaghmore/Ashbourne, Walterstown, 17/8/2014,
- Na Fianna 2-11, 1-14 Moynalvey, Kildalkey, 17/8/2014,

Round 5

- Summerhill 1-17, 0-12 Moynalvey, Dunsany, 30/8/2014,
- Donaghmore/Ashbourne 0-17, 1-11 St. Patrick's, Pairc Tailteann, 30/8/2014,
- Na Fianna 1-10, 1-9 Rathkenny, Dunshaughlin, 30/8/2014,

== Knock-out Stages ==
=== Relegation Play Off ===
The three bottom finishers from each group qualify for the relegation play off and play each other in a round robin basis. The team with the worst record after two matches will be relegated to the 2015 Intermediate Championship.

Team	Pld	W	L	D	PF	PA	PD	Pts
Rathkenny	1	1	0	0	12	5	+7	2
Walterstown	1	1	0	0	16	11	+5	2
Oldcastle	2	0	2	0	16	28	-12	0

- Game 1: Oldcastle 2-5, 0-16 Walterstown, Kilmainham, 6/9/2014,
- Game 2: Oldcastle 0-5, 0-12 Rathkenny, Kilmainhamwood, 13/9/2014,

=== Finals ===
The winners and runners up of each group qualify for the quarter-finals along with the third placed finisher of Group A.

Preliminary Quarter-Finals
Seneschalstown	0-7
Summerhill	0-17

Quarter-Finals
Wolfe Tones	2-11
Summerhill	0-8
Navan O'Mahonys	3-14
Skryne	2-11
Simonstown Gaels	2-9
Na Fianna	1-15
Donaghmore/Ashbourne	3-13
Duleek/Bellewstown	0-8

Semi-Finals
Wolfe Tones	0-10
Navan O'Mahonys	1-13
Na Fianna	0-12
Donaghmore/Ashbourne	2-14

Final
Navan O'Mahonys	2-11
Donaghmore/Ashbourne	2-9

Preliminary Quarter-Final:

- Seneschalstown 0-7, 0-17 Summerhill, Ashbourne, 7/9/2014,

Quarter-finals:

- Donaghmore/Ashbourne 3-13, 0-8 Duleek/Bellewstown, Pairc Tailteann, 12/9/2014,
- Simonstown Gaels 2-9, 1-15 Na Fianna, Trim, 13/9/2014,
- Wolfe Tones 2-11, 0-8 Summerhill, Pairc Tailteann, 13/9/2014,
- Navan O'Mahonys 3-14, 2-11 Skryne, Pairc Tailteann, 14/9/2014,

Semi-finals:

- Na Fianna 0-12, 2-14 Donaghmore/Ashbourne, Pairc Tailteann, 4/10/2014,
- Wolfe Tones 0-10, 1-13 Navan O'Mahonys, Pairc Tailteann, 5/10/2014,

Final:

- Navan O'Mahonys 2-11, 2-9 Donaghmore/Ashbourne, Pairc Tailteann, 19/10/2014,
19 October 2014
3:30pm
Final

Navan O'Mahonys	2-11 - 2-9	Donaghmore/Ashbourne
J Regan 1-4 (4f), S Bray 0-3 (2f), R O'Coileain 1-0, G O'Brien, A Forde, D Bray, S Gillespie 0-1 each.	Report	A Tormey 1-3, M Deegan 0-5 (3f), B Menton 1-0, E Callaghan 0-1.

Pairc Tailteann, Meath
Attendance: ???
Referee: Colm McManus, Gaeil Colmcille.

== Leinster Senior Club Football Championship ==
Quarter-final:

- Rhode 4-10, 0-13 Navan O'Mahonys, O'Connor Park, 9/11/2014,
