= 2015 Meath Senior Football Championship =

Meath S.F.C.
- Season: 2015
- Champions: Navan O'Mahonys; 20th Senior Championship Title
- Relegated: Walterstown
- Leinster SCFC: Navan O'Mahonys (Quarter-Final) Killoe Young Emmets 0-11, 1-6 Navan O'Mahonys
- All Ireland SCFC: n/a
- Winning Captain: Gary O'Brien (Navan O'Mahonys)
- Man of the Match: Marcus Brennan (Navan O'Mahonys)
- Matches: 56

The 2015 Meath Senior Football Championship is the 123rd edition of the Meath GAA's premier club Gaelic football tournament for senior clubs in County Meath, Ireland. Eighteen teams compete, with the winner going on to represent Meath in the Leinster Senior Club Football Championship. The championship starts with a group stage and then progresses to a knock out stage.

Navan O'Mahonys were the defending champions after they defeated Donaghmore/Ashbourne in the previous years final, and they successfully defended their title, becoming the first team to manage that feat since Dunshaughlin's three-in-a-row between 2000 and 2002. The Navan side defeated Na Fianna 0–13 to 1–8 on Bank Holiday Monday 26 October 2015 in Pairc Tailteann. This was the first time the final was held on a Monday. Former Meath player Gary O'Brien raised the Keegan Cup for the 20th time for O'Mahonys while goalkeeper Marcus Brennan claimed the 'Man of the Match' award.

This was Ballinlough's return to the senior grade 8 years since relegation in 2007 after claiming the 2014 Meath Intermediate Football Championship title.

The draw for the group stages of the championship were made on 9 February 2015 with the games commencing on the weekend of 10 April 2015.

Walterstown were relegated to the Intermediate grade after 51 years in the top flight. The 'Blacks' are the only Meath side to reach an All-Ireland Club SFC Final (1980–81 and 1983–84). The only club to have been in the top flight for longer are Skryne, who have played senior football since 1938 (78 years in 2015).

== Team changes ==
The following teams have changed division since the 2014 championship season.

=== To S.F.C. ===
Promoted from I.F.C.

- Ballinlough - (Intermediate Champions)

=== From S.F.C. ===
Relegated to I.F.C.

- Oldcastle

== Participating teams ==
The teams taking part in the 2015 Meath Senior Football Championship are:

Club	Location	Pre C'ship Odds	2014 Championship Position	2015 Championship Position
Ballinlough	Ballinlough	40/1	Intermediate Champions	Non Qualifier
Blackhall Gaels	Batterstown	33/1	Non Qualifier	Non Qualifier
Donaghmore/Ashbourne	Ashbourne	9/2	Finalists	Quarter-Finalist
Duleek/Bellewstown	Duleek	33/1	Quarter-Finalist	Non Qualifier
Dunshaughlin	Dunshaughlin	33/1	Non Qualifier	Quarter-Finalist
Gaeil Colmcille	Kells	33/1	Non Qualifier	Semi-finalist
Moynalvey	Moynalvey	40/1	Non Qualifier	Non Qualifier
Na Fianna	Enfield	9/1	Semi-finalist	Finalists
Navan O'Mahonys	Navan	7/4	Champions	Champions
Rathkenny	Rathkenny	28/1	Relegation Playoff	Relegation Playoff
Seneschalstown	Kentstown	25/1	Preliminary Quarter-Finalist	Non Qualifier
Simonstown Gaels	Navan	10/1	Quarter-Finalist	Non Qualifier
Skryne	Skryne	22/1	Quarter-Finalist	Preliminary Quarter-Finalist
St Patricks	Stamullen	28/1	Non Qualifier	Relegation Playoff
St. Peter's Dunboyne	Dunboyne	16/1	Non Qualifier	Semi-finalist
Summerhill	Summerhill	6/1	Quarter-Finalist	Quarter-Finalist
Walterstown	Navan	40/1	Relegation Playoff	Relegated
Wolfe Tones	Kilberry	15/2	Semi-Finalist	Quarter-Finalist

== Group stage ==
There are 3 groups called Group A, B and C. The 2 top finishers in each group and the third-place finisher in Group A will qualify for the quarter-finals. The third placed teams in Group B and C will qualify for a Preliminary Quarter-final, with the winner earning a place in last eight. The bottom finishers of each group will qualify for the Relegation Play Off. The draw for the group stages of the championship were made on 9 February 2015 with the games commencing on the weekend of 10 April 2015.

=== Group A ===
Team	Pld	W	L	D	PF	PA	PD	Pts
St. Peter's Dunboyne	5	4	1	0	79	58	+21	8
Summerhill	5	3	1	1	84	62	+22	7
Wolfe Tones	5	3	2	0	70	63	+7	6
Moynalvey	5	2	3	0	69	87	-18	4
Duleek/Bellewstown	5	1	3	1	57	81	-24	3
Rathkenny	5	1	4	0	58	66	-8	2

Round 1

- St. Peter's Dunboyne 1-16, 1-4 Duleek/Bellewstown, Ashbourne, 10/4/2015,
- Wolfe Tones 2-13, 0-9 Moynalvey, Pairc Tailteann, 11/4/2015,
- Summerhill 3-12, 0-10 Rathkenny, Pairc Tailteann, 12/4/2015,

Round 2

- St. Peter's Dunboyne 1-10, 1-9 Wolfe Tones, Pairc Tailteann, 19/4/2015,
- Moynalvey 3-10, 0-13 Summerhill, Trim, 25/4/2015,
- Duleek/Bellewstown 0-10, 0-7 Rathkenny, Simonstown, 26/4/2015,

Round 3

- Moynalvey 2-18, 1-10 Duleek/Bellewstown, Walterstown, 21/5/2015,
- St. Peter's Dunboyne 0-14, 1-10 Rathkenny, Trim, 22/5/2015,
- Summerhill 1-15, 0-10 Wolfe Tones, Dunsany, 23/5/2015,

Round 4

- St. Peter's Dunboyne 2-20, 0-10 Moynalvey, Summerhill, 7/8/2015,
- Duleek/Bellewstown 1–13, 1-13 Summerhill, Ratoath, 9/8/2015,
- Wolfe Tones 2-8, 1-9 Rathkenny, Pairc Tailteann, 9/8/2015,

Round 5

- Wolfe Tones 0-15, 2-5 Duleek/Bellewstown, Skryne, 23/8/2015,
- Rathkenny 2-10, 1-4 Moynalvey, Walterstown, 23/8/2015,
- Summerhill 2-10, 0-7 St. Peter's Dunboyne, Dunsany, 23/8/2015,

=== Group B ===
Team	Pld	W	L	D	PF	PA	PD	Pts
Donaghmore/Ashbourne	5	4	1	0	84	61	+23	8
Navan O'Mahonys	5	3	1	1	80	59	+21	7
Skryne	5	3	2	0	65	70	-5	6
Seneschalstown	5	2	3	0	61	71	-10	4
Ballinlough	5	2	3	0	57	68	-11	4
St. Patrick's	5	0	4	1	64	82	-18	1

Round 1

- Navan O'Mahonys 2-17, 2-5 Seneschalstown, Pairc Tailteann, 10/4/2015,
- Donaghmore/Ashbourne 2-11, 2-6 Ballinlough, Walterstown, 11/4/2015,
- Skryne 1-14, 3-3 St. Patrick's, Duleek, 11/4/2015,

Round 2

- Navan O'Mahonys 1-12, 1-8 Donaghmore/Ashbourne, Walterstown, 19/4/2015,
- Ballinlough 2-8, 1-10 St. Patrick's, Simonstown, 24/4/2015,
- Skryne 0-14, 1-9 Seneschalstown, Ratoath, 26/4/2015,

Round 3

- St. Patrick's 1–12, 0-15 Navan O'Mahonys, Duleek, 22/5/2015,
- Skryne 0-14, 2-4 Ballinlough, Kells, 24/5/2015,
- Donaghmore/Ashbourne 1-11, 0-11 Seneschalstown, Stamullen, 24/5/2015,

Round 4

- Ballinlough 0-12, 1-8 Navan O'Mahonys, Athboy, 7/8/2015,
- Seneschalstown 1-11, 1-8 St. Patrick's, Duleek, 8/8/2015,
- Donaghmore/Ashbourne 0-20, 1-7 Skryne, Stamullen, 9/8/2015,

Round 5

- Navan O'Mahonys 2-10, 0-10 Skryne, Simonstown, 23/8/2015,
- Donaghmore/Ashbourne 2-16, 3-4 St. Patrick's, Duleek, 23/8/2015,
- Seneschalstown 1-10, 0-9 Ballinlough, Pairc Tailteann, 23/8/2015,

=== Group C ===
Team	Pld	W	L	D	PF	PA	PD	Pts
Gaeil Colmcille	5	4	1	0	78	61	+17	8
Na Fianna	5	4	1	0	74	67	+7	8
Dunshaughlin	5	3	2	0	78	67	+11	6
Simonstown Gaels	5	2	2	1	81	76	+5	5
Blackhall Gaels	5	1	4	0	65	84	-19	2
Walterstown	5	0	4	1	51	72	-21	1

Round 1

- Walterstown 2–9, 3-6 Simonstown Gaels, Trim, 12/4/2015,
- Dunshaughlin 0-15, 1-7 Gaeil Colmcille, Seneschalstown, 12/4/2015,
- Na Fianna 1-10, 0-12 Blackhall Gaels, Summerhill, 18/4/2015,

Round 2

- Gaeil Colmcille 2-12, 1-9 Simonstown Gaels, Brews Hill, 24/4/2015,
- Na Fianna 3-10, 1-10 Dunshaughlin, Trim, 24/4/2015,
- Blackhall Gaels 1-11, 2-4 Walterstown, Skryne, 24/4/2015,

Round 3

- Dunshaughlin 0-14, 1-5 Walterstown, Trim, 24/5/2015,
- Gaeil Colmcille 1-16, 1-8 Na Fianna, Summerhill, 24/5/2015,
- Simonstown Gaels 3-13, 1-10 Blackhall Gaels, Skryne, 29/5/2015,

Round 4

- Gaeil Colmcille 1-15, 1-11 Blackhall Gaels, Walterstown, 6/8/2015,
- Na Fianna 2-10, 0-9 Walterstown, Pairc Tailteann, 8/8/2015,
- Simonstown Gaels 1-15, 0-15 Dunshaughlin, Pairc Tailteann, 11/8/2015,

Round 5

- Gaeil Colmcille 0-13, 0-9 Walterstown, Castletown, 22/8/2015,
- Dunshaughlin 3-12, 0-12 Blackhall Gaels, Moynalvey, 22/8/2015,
- Na Fianna 1-12, 0-14 Simonstown Gaels, Pairc Tailteann, 22/8/2015,

== Knock-out Stages ==
=== Relegation Play Off ===
The three bottom finishers from each group qualify for the relegation play off and play each other in a round robin basis. The team with the worst record after two matches will be relegated to the 2016 Intermediate Championship.

Team	Pld	W	L	D	PF	PA	PD	Pts
Rathkenny	2	2	0	0	34	22	+12	4
St. Patrick's	2	1	1	0	26	27	-1	2
Walterstown	2	0	2	0	18	29	-11	0

- Game 1: Rathkenny 1-15, 2-7 St. Patrick's, Brews Hill, 4/9/2015,
- Game 2: St. Patrick's 0-13, 0-9 Walterstown, Seneschalstown, 12/9/2015,
- Game 3: Walterstown 0–9, 1-13 Rathkenny, Simonstown, 23/9/2015,

=== Finals ===
The winners and runners up of each group qualify for the quarter-finals along with the third-placed finisher of Group A.

Preliminary Quarter-Finals
Skryne	3-12
Dunshaughlin	3-14

Quarter-Finals
St. Peter's Dunboyne	1-14
Dunshaughlin	0-13
Navan O'Mahonys	1-18
Summerhill	0-9
Donaghmore/Ashbourne	0-11
Na Fianna	1-15
Gaeil Colmcille	2-7
Wolfe Tones	0-12

Semi-Finals
St. Peter's Dunboyne	2-13
Navan O'Mahonys	0-22
Na Fianna	1-19
Gaeil Colmcille	0-12

Final
Navan O'Mahonys	0-13
Na Fianna	1-8

Preliminary Quarter-Final:

- Dunshaughlin 3-14, 3-12 Skryne, Simonstown, 4/9/2015,

Quarter-finals:

- Na Fianna 1-15, 0-11 Donaghmore/Ashbourne, Pairc Tailteann, 5/9/2015,
- Gaeil Colmcille 2-7, 0-12 Wolfe Tones, Pairc Tailteann, 6/9/2015,
- Navan O'Mahonys 1-18, 0-9 Summerhill, Pairc Tailteann, 6/9/2015,
- St. Peter's Dunboyne 1-14, 0-13 Dunshaughlin, Pairc Tailteann, 12/9/2015,

Semi-finals:

- Na Fianna 1-19, 0-12 Gaeil Colmcille, Pairc Tailteann, 3/10/2015,
- Navan O'Mahonys 0-22, 2-13 St. Peter's Dunboyne, Pairc Tailteann, 4/10/2015,

Final:

- Navan O'Mahonys 0-13, 1-8 Na Fianna, Pairc Tailteann, 26/10/2015,
26 October 2015
3:00pm
Final

Navan O'Mahonys	0-13 - 1-8	Na Fianna
J. Regan 0-5 (5f), S. Bray (0-4), R. Ó'Coileáin 0-3 (2f), D. Bray (0-1).	Report	E. Devine 1-2 (1f), D. Queeney 0-4 (4f), D. McDonagh and B. Clancy 0-1 each.

Pairc Tailteann, Meath
Referee: Padraig Coyle, Seneschalstown.

The final between Navan O'Mahonys and Na Fianna was originally fixed for Sunday 18 October but due to a clash with Ireland -vs- Argentina in the quarter-finals of the 2015 Rugby World Cup, it was switched to Bank Holiday Monday 26 October to encourage a larger crowd to attend the final.

== Leinster Senior Club Football Championship ==
Quarter-final:

- Killoe Young Emmets 0-11, 1-6 Navan O'Mahonys, Pearse Park, 8/11/2015,
