= 2017 Meath Senior Football Championship =

Meath S.F.C.
- Season: 2017
- Champions: Simonstown Gaels (2nd title)
- Relegated: Duleek/Bellewstown
- All Ireland SCFC: ???
- Winning Captain: Padraig McKeever
- Man of the Match: Padraig McKeever
- Winning Manager: Colm O'Rourke
- Leinster SCFC: Simonstown Gaels
- Matches: 55

The 2017 Meath Senior Football Championship is the 125th edition of the Meath GAA's premier club Gaelic football tournament for senior clubs in County Meath, Ireland. Eighteen teams compete, with the winner representing Meath in the Leinster Senior Club Football Championship. The championship starts with a group stage and then progresses to a knock out stage.

Simonstown Gaels were the defending champions after they defeated Donaghmore/Ashbourne in the 2016 final, and they successfully defended their title to claim their 2nd ever crown when defeating Summerhill in the final in Pairc Tailteann by 2–9 to 0–7 on 29 October 2017. Padraig McKeever raised the Keegan Cup for the North Navan side and also claimed the "Man-of-the-Match" award for the second year in succession.

This was St. Colmcille's return to the top flight after a 20-year exodus since relegation in 1996, due to claiming the 2016 Meath Intermediate Football Championship title as well as a Leinster IFC title and an All-Ireland IFC runners-up spot.

This year saw the 10th "Navan El Classico" take place in the SFC as Simonstown Gaels defeated Navan O'Mahonys in the group stage by 0–12 to 0–7. Their current overall head-to-head score is 5–4 in favour of O'Mahonys and 1 draw.

The draw for the group stages of the championship were made on 6 March 2017 with the games commencing on the weekend of 20 May 2017.

Duleek/Bellewstown were relegated to the I.F.C. for the first time in since being established in 2008 after failing to win a match all season, and thus ended their 10-season tenure in the top flight.

The semi-final between Simonstown Gaels and Wolfe Tones was the first Meath championship match to be broadcast live by Eir Sport, which the second semi-final between Summerhill and Gaeil Colmcille was the first senior match to be broadcast live on the newly developed Meath GAA App.

== Team changes ==
The following teams have changed division since the 2016 championship season.

=== To S.F.C. ===
Promoted from I.F.C.

- St. Colmcille's - (Intermediate Champions)

=== From S.F.C. ===
Relegated to I.F.C.

- Ballinlough

== Participating teams ==
The teams taking part in the 2017 Meath Senior Football Championship are:

Club	Location	Pre C'ship Odds	2016 Championship Position	2017 Championship Position
Blackhall Gaels	Batterstown & Kilcloon	40/1	Non Qualifier	Relegation Playoff
Donaghmore/Ashbourne	Ashbourne	6/1	Finalist	Non Qualifier
Duleek/Bellewstown	Bellewstown & Duleek	66/1	Relegation Playoff	Relegated
Dunshaughlin	Dunshaughlin & Drumree	25/1	Preliminary Quarter-Finalist	Non Qualifier
Gaeil Colmcille	Kells	16/1	Semi-finalist	Semi-finalist
Moynalvey	Moynalvey & Kiltale	10/1	Non Qualifier	Quarter-Finalist
Na Fianna	Enfield & Baconstown	16/1	Quarter-Finalist	Preliminary Quarter-Finalist
Navan O'Mahonys	Navan	7/2	Non Qualifier	Quarter-Finalist
Rathkenny	Rathkenny & Stackallan	50/1	Non Qualifier	Non Qualifier
Ratoath	Ratoath	6/1	Non Qualifier	Quarter-Finalist
Seneschalstown	Kentstown & Yellow Furze	28/1	Quarter-Finalist	Non Qualifier
Simonstown Gaels	Navan	10/1	champions	champions
Skryne	Skryne & Tara	16/1	Semi-Finalist	Relegation Playoff
St. Patrick's	Gormanston, Julianstown & Stamullen	50/1	Non Qualifier	Non Qualifier
St. Colmcille's	Bettystown, Donacarney, Laytown & Mornington	25/1	Intermediate Champions	Non Qualifier
St. Peter's Dunboyne	Dunboyne	7/2	Quarter-Finalist	Quarter-Finalist
Summerhill	Summerhill	10/1	Quarter-Finalist	Finalist
Wolfe Tones	Kilberry, Gibbstown, Oristown & Wilkinstown	12/1	Relegation Playoff	Semi-finalist

== Group stage ==
There are three groups of six teams called Group A, B and C. The 2 top finishers in each group and the third-place finisher in Group A will qualify for the quarter-finals. The third placed teams in Group B and C will qualify for a Preliminary Quarter-final, with the winner earning a place in last eight. The bottom finishers of each group will qualify for the Relegation Play Off. The draw for the group stages of the championship were made on 6 March 2017 with the games commencing on the weekend of 20 May 2017.

=== Group A ===
Team	Pld	W	L	D	PF	PA	PD	Pts
Summerhill	5	4	1	0	84	61	+23	8
Gaeil Colmcille	5	4	1	0	75	57	+18	8
Wolfe Tones	5	3	1	1	92	65	+27	7
Donaghmore/Ashbourne	5	1	3	1	99	77	+22	5
Rathkenny	5	1	4	0	58	84	-26	2
Duleek/Bellewstown	5	0	5	0	48	112	-64	0

Round 1

- Donaghmore/Ashbourne 2-13, 1-13 Rathkenny, Pairc Tailteann, 18/5/2017,
- Gaeil Colmcille 1-11, 0-11 Wolfe Tones, Athboy, 18/5/2017,
- Summerhill 1-13, 2-5 Duleek/Bellewstown, Pairc Tailteann, 21/5/2017,

Round 2

- Rathkenny 0-13, 1-6 Duleek/Bellewstown, Simonstown, 21/7/2017,
- Wolfe Tones 2–12, 1-15 Donaghmore/Ashbourne, Pairc Tailteann, 23/7/2017,
- Summerhill 1-12, 0-11 Gaeil Colmcille, Trim, 23/7/2017,

Round 3

- Wolfe Tones 2-14, 1-9 Rathkenny, Pairc Tailteann, 13/8/2017,
- Gaeil Colmcille 1-17, 1-8 Duleek/Bellewstown, Walterstown, 13/8/2017,
- Summerhill 2-15, 2-7 Donaghmore/Ashbourne, Pairc Tailteann, 15/8/2017,

Round 4

- Wolfe Tones 2-20, 0-10 Duleek/Bellewstown, Castletown, 25/8/2017,
- Summerhill 1-18, 0-9 Rathkenny, Simonstown, 25/8/2017,
- Gaeil Colmcille 2-9, 0-12 Donaghmore/Ashbourne, Pairc Tailteann, 26/8/2017,

Round 5

- Donaghmore/Ashbourne 7-16, 0-7 Duleek/Bellewstown, Donore, 8/9/2017,
- Wolfe Tones 2-11, 0-11 Summerhill, Simonstown, 8/9/2017,
- Gaeil Colmcille 0-15, 0-8 Rathkenny, Meath Hill, 8/9/2017,

=== Group B ===
Team	Pld	W	L	D	PF	PA	PD	Pts
Simonstown Gaels	5	5	0	0	91	55	+36	10
Moynalvey	5	4	1	0	98	85	+13	8
Navan O'Mahonys	5	3	2	0	76	67	+9	6
Seneschalstown	5	2	3	0	75	96	-21	4
St. Colmcille's	5	0	4	1	80	89	-9	1
Blackhall Gaels	5	0	4	1	69	97	-28	1

Round 1

- Navan O'Mahonys 1-13, 1-10 Blackhall Gaels, Dunshaughlin, 19/5/2017,
- Moynalvey 0-17, 1-9 Seneschalstown, Trim, 19/5/2017,
- Simonstown Gaels 1-16, 2-12 St. Colmcille's, Pairc Tailteann, 19/5/2017,

Round 2

- Simonstown Gaels 2-17, 0-11 Moynalvey, Pairc Tailteann, 20/7/2017,
- Seneschalstown 3-16, 2-12 Blackhall Gaels, Dunshaughlin, 24/7/2017,
- Navan O'Mahonys 0-12, 0-9 St. Colmcille's, Pairc Tailteann, 25/7/2017,

Round 3

- Simonstown Gaels 3-13, 1-10 Seneschalstown, Castletown, 12/8/2017,
- St. Colmcille's 1–15, 1-15 Blackhall Gaels, Ratoath, 13/8/2017,
- Moynalvey 3-15, 1-15 Navan O'Mahonys, Skryne, 13/8/2017,

Round 4

- Simonstown Gaels 0-12, 0-7 Navan O'Mahonys, Pairc Tailteann, 27/8/2017,
- Seneschalstown 1-14, 1-13 St. Colmcille's, Stamullen, 27/8/2017,
- Moynalvey 3-14, 1-10 Blackhall Gaels, Summerhill, 27/8/2017,

Round 5

- Navan O'Mahonys 3-14, 0-9 Seneschalstown, Pairc Tailteann, 9/9/2018,
- Moynalvey 3-14, 2-13 St. Colmcille's, Skryne, 9/9/2018,
- Simonstown Gaels 1-12, 1-4 Blackhall Gaels, Dunshaughlin, 9/9/2018,

=== Group C ===
Team	Pld	W	L	D	PF	PA	PD	Pts
Ratoath	5	5	0	0	88	57	+31	10
St. Peter's Dunboyne	5	4	0	1	100	75	+25	8
Na Fianna	5	1	2	2	74	84	-10	4
St Patrick's	5	2	3	0	73	80	-7	4
Dunshaughlin	5	1	3	1	64	72	-8	3
Skryne	5	0	4	1	62	93	-31	1

Round 1

- St. Peter's Dunboyne 1-12, 1-7 Dunshaughlin, Dunsany, 17/5/2017,
- St. Patrick's 2-16, 1-10 Skryne, Duleek, 19/5/2017,
- Ratoath 1-14, 0-14 Na Fianna, Dunsany, 19/5/2017,

Round 2

- Ratoath 1-16, 1-7 St. Patrick's, Skryne, 21/7/2017,
- Dunshaughlin 1–11, 1-11 Na Fianna, Summerhill, 23/7/2017,
- St. Peter's Dunboyne 2-14, 0-10 Skryne, Ratoath, 24/7/2017,

Round 3

- St. Peter's Dunboyne 2-16, 2-12 St. Patrick's, Duleek, 13/8/2017,
- Na Fianna 0–14, 0-14 Skryne, Pairc Tailteann, 14/8/2017,
- Ratoath 2-10, 0-8 Dunshaughlin, Ashbourne, 14/8/2017,

Round 4

- Ratoath 1-14, 0-11 Skryne, Ashbourne, 27/8/2017,
- St. Peter's Dunboyne 2-23, 1-15 Na Fianna, Dunshaughlin, 27/8/2017,
- St. Patrick's 1-10, 0-12 Dunshaughlin, Ashbourne, 28/8/2017,

Round 5

- Na Fianna 1-11, 1-7 St. Patrick's, Walterstown, 10/9/2018,
- Dunshaughlin 2-14, 1-11 Skryne, Trim, 10/9/2018,
- Ratoath 2-13, 1-11 St. Peter's Dunboyne, Pairc Tailteann, 10/9/2018,

== Knock-Out Stage ==
The winners and runners up of the three groups and the third placed team of Group A automatically qualify for the quarter-finals. The third placed teams in Groups B and C play off to determine the team that completes the quarter-final lineup.

Preliminary round
Navan O'Mahonys	1-20 (A.E.T.)
Na Fianna	1-13 (A.E.T.)

Quarter-Finals
Summerhill	2-12
Navan O'Mahonys	1-10
Moynalvey	0-13
Gaeil Colmcille	1-11
Simonstown Gaels	4-12
St. Peter's Dunboyne	2-16
Ratoath	0-14 (A.E.T.)
Wolfe Tones	0-15 (A.E.T.)

Semi-Finals
Summerhill	1-15
Gaeil Colmcille	0-9
Simonstown Gaels	4-9
Wolfe Tones	1-13

Final
Summerhill	0-7
Simonstown Gaels	2-9

== Preliminary Quarter-Final ==
23 September 2017	Navan O'Mahonys	1-20 - 1-13	Na Fianna	Trim; Referee: Patrick Nelis (Kilmainham)
23 September 2017	Dylan Regan 1-4, Stephen Bray 0-6 (0-2f), Ruairi Ó Coileain and Paul Whelehan 0-4 each, Shane Gillespie and James O'Reilly 0-1 each	Report	Daniel Queeney 0-5 (0-4f), Sean Martin 1-0, Conor Downey (0-1f) and Barry Clancy (0-1f) 0-3 each, John Baldwin and Owen McDonnell 0-1 each	Trim; Referee: Patrick Nelis (Kilmainham)

== Quarter-finals ==
22 September 2017	Wolfe Tones	0-15 - 0-14	Ratoath	Ashbourne; Referee: David Gough (Slane)
22 September 2017	Cian Ward 0-7f, Thomas O'Reilly 0-4 (0-2f), Niall O'Reilly 0-3, Dan O'Neill 0-1	Report	Eamon Wallace 0-7f, Joey Wallace 0-5, Gavin McGowan and Jack McGowan 0-1 each	Ashbourne; Referee: David Gough (Slane)

24 September 2017	Gaeil Colmcille	1-11 - 0-13	Moynalvey	Trim; Referee: David Coldrick (Blackhall Gaels)
24 September 2017	Ryan Farnham 1-2, Seamus Mattimoe, Oisin Reilly, Brian Hanlon 0-2 each, Barry Smith, Martin Barrett, Fionn Ferguson 0-1 each	Report	David McLoughlin 0-5, Stephen Donoghue and Cillian O'Sullivan (0-1f) 0-2 each, Anthony Forde, John Donoghue, Adam Murphy, Mark O'Sullivan 0-1 each	Trim; Referee: David Coldrick (Blackhall Gaels)

24 September 2017	Simonstown Gaels	4-12 - 2-16	St. Peter's Dunboyne	Pairc Tailteann; Referee: Cormac Reilly (St Mary's)
24 September 2017	Pauric McKeever 2-5 (0-1f), Mark McCabe 2-1 (1-0 pen), Sean Tobin 0-2f, Brian McGrath, Shane O'Rourke, Nathan O'Brien, Seamus Kenny 0-1 each	Report	Donal Lenihan 2-3, Robbie McCarthy 0-6 (0-1f), David McEntee 0-4, Seamus Lavin 0-2, Stuart Lowndes 0-1	Pairc Tailteann; Referee: Cormac Reilly (St Mary's)

10 October 2017; 8:00 pm	Summerhill	2-12 - 1-10	Navan O'Mahonys	Ashbourne; Referee: Paul Mooney (Syddan)
10 October 2017; 8:00 pm	Barry Dardis 1-3 (0-2f, 1 '45), Sean Dalton 1-2, Brian Ennis (0-3f) and Conor Lyons (0-3f) 0-3 each, David Larkin 0-1	Report	Ruairi O'Coileain 0-4 (0-2f), Shane Gillespie 1-1, Paul Whelehan 0-2, James O'Reilly, Conor Finnegan, Cormac McGuinness 0-1 each	Ashbourne; Referee: Paul Mooney (Syddan)

== Semi-finals ==
14 October 2017; 3:00 pm	Simonstown Gaels	4-9 - 1-13	Wolfe Tones	Pairc Tailteann; Referee: Patrick Nelis (Kilmainham); Man of the Match: Mark McCabe
14 October 2017; 3:00 pm	Mark McCabe 2-1, Nathan O'Brien 1-2, Sean Tobin 0-3 (0-1f), Pauric McKeever 1-0, Conor Sheridan 0-2, Mickey Brennan 0-1f	Report	Cian Ward 0-7 (0-6f, 1 '45), Niall McLoughlin 1-1, Thomas O'Reilly 0-3f, Niall O'Reilly and Padraic Diamond 0-1 each	Pairc Tailteann; Referee: Patrick Nelis (Kilmainham); Man of the Match: Mark McCabe

15 October 2017; 3:00 pm	Summerhill	1-15 - 0-9	Gaeil Colmcille	Pairc Tailteann; Referee: Cormac Reilly (St. Mary's); Man of the Match: Barry Dardis
15 October 2017; 3:00 pm	Barry Dardis 1-2, Michael Byrne (0-3f), Sean Dalton, David Larkin 0-3 each, David Dalton 0-2, Padraig Geraghty and Brian Ennis (0-1f) 0-1 each	Report	Séamus Mattimoe 0-4 (3f), Oisin Reilly, Brian Hanlon (2f) 0-2 each, Barry Tormay 0-1.	Pairc Tailteann; Referee: Cormac Reilly (St. Mary's); Man of the Match: Barry Dardis

== Final ==
29 October 2017; 3:00 pm Final	Simonstown Gaels	2-9 - 0-7	Summerhill	Pairc Tailteann; Attendance: 5,040; Referee: Liam O'Brien (Duleek-Bellewstown); Man of the Match: Padraig McKeever
29 October 2017; 3:00 pm Final	Padraig McKeever 1-4 (0-2f), Conor Sheridan 1-2, Shane O'Rourke, Sean Tobin, Seamus Kenny 0-1 each	Report	Brian Ennis 0-3 (0-2f), Barry Dardis (1 '45), Sean Dalton, Caolan Young, David Dalton 0-1 each	Pairc Tailteann; Attendance: 5,040; Referee: Liam O'Brien (Duleek-Bellewstown); Man of the Match: Padraig McKeever

== Relegation Play-Off Group ==
The three bottom teams from each group enter the relegation play-off group and play each other in a round robin basis.

The team with the worst record after two matches will be relegated to the 2018 Intermediate Championship.

Duleek/Bellewstown lost both round robin matches and were relegated meaning the final match between Skryne and Blackhall Gaels was not required.

Team	Pld	W	L	D	PF	PA	PD	Pts
Skryne	1	1	0	0	25	13	+12	2
Blackhall Gaels	1	1	0	0	16	12	+4	2
Duleek/Bellewstown	2	0	2	0	25	41	-16	0

- Game 1: Blackhall Gaels 1-13, 2-6 Duleek/Bellewstown, Skryne, 16/9/2017,
- Game 2: Skryne 2-19, 0-13 Duleek/Bellewstown, Dunshaughlin, 24/9/2017,

== Leinster Senior Club Football Championship ==
Quarter-final:

- Starlights 0–8, 1-12 Simonstown, Wexford Park, 12/11/2017,

Semi-final:

- St. Loman's Mullingar 0-13, 1-8 Simonstown Gaels, Cusack Park, 26/11/2017,
