= 2022 Gerry Reilly Cup =

Annual juvenile Gaelic football tournament

Tournament details
- Year: 2022
- Trophy: Gerry Reilly Cup
- Date: 9 April — 14 August
- Teams: 7

Winners
- Champions: Louth (1st win)

Runners-up
- Runners-up: Meath

The 2022 Gerry Reilly Cup was the thirty-third staging of the Gerry Reilly Cup, the under-16 inter-county Gaelic football competition hosted by Meath club Oldcastle. Louth won the tournament for the first time, after defeating Meath by eleven points in the final.

== Format ==
The tournament consisted of two groups of teams. Two points were awarded for a win and one point for a draw. The top two teams in each group qualified for the semi-finals.

== Table ==
After completion of the group stage, Louth and Cavan qualified from Group 1. Meath and Kildare progressed from Group 2.

=== Group 1 ===
Table	P	W	D	L	F	A	+/-	Pts
Louth	2	2	0	0	47	26	+21	4
Cavan	2	1	0	1	45	38	7	2
Antrim	2	0	0	2	24	52	-28	0

=== Group 2 ===
Table	P	W	D	L	F	A	+/-	Pts
Meath	3	3	0	0	80	31	+49	6
Kildare	3	2	0	1	70	42	+28	4
Clare	3	1	0	2	38	68	-30	2
Fermanagh	3	0	0	3	20	67	-47	0

== Knockout stage ==
=== Semi-Finals ===
23 July 2022	Meath	2-17 - 2-14	Cavan
				Referee: P. Skelly (Meath)

23 July 2022	Louth	3-17 - 0-15	Kildare
				Referee: P. Skelly (Meath)

=== Final ===
14 August 2022	Meath	1-12 – 5-11	Louth
	Gls: J. Harkin (pen) 1-0; Pts: B. Smyth 0-4 (3f), C. Commons, J. Harkin (2f) 0-3 each, T. Lenehan, M. McIvor 0-1 each		Gls: D. Shevlin 2-0, A. Gillespie, P. Grimes-Murphy, J. Healy 1-0 each Pts: A. Gillespie (1f), P. Grimes-Murphy, J. Healy (1f), D. Shevlin 0-2 each, S. Flynn, S. Lennon, C. McKeown 0-1 each	Referee: C. Dourneen (Cavan)

GK	1	Jamie McCormack (St Peter's Dunboyne)
RCB	2	Oliver Maloney (Walterstown)
FB	3	Paddy White (Ratoath)
LCB	4	Cormac Liggan (Dunderry)
RHB	5	Tom Lenehan (Skryne)
CHB	6	John Gormley (Gaeil Colmcille)
LHB	7	Ciarán O'Hare (Rathkenny)
MF	8	Cian Commons (Seneschalstown)
MF	9	David Donnelly (Bective)
RHF	10	Billy Smyth (Skryne)
CHF	11	John Harkin (St Peter's Dunboyne)
LHF	12	Michael McIvor (St Vincent's)
RCF	13	Aaron O'Rourke (Trim)
FF	14	Liam Jennings (Blackhall Gaels)
LCF	15	Kyle Ennis (Trim)
Substitutes:
	16	Naoise Maguire (St Colmcille's)
	17	Hugh Kehoe (Ratoath)
	18	Oisín Yore (Carnaross)
	19	Rory Crawley (Oldcastle)
	20	Andrew Gormley (Gaeil Colmcille)
	21	Tiernan Anderson (Gaeil Colmcille)

GK	1	Cian O'Donoghue (Geraldines)
RCB	2	Ciarán McGinty (St Fechin's)
FB	3	Caoimhín Prout (St Kevin's)
LCB	4	Keelin Martin (St Mary's)
RHB	5	Cormac McKeown (St Joseph's)
CHB	6	Micheál Reid (Hunterstown Rovers) (c)
LHB	7	Shayne Soraghan (Geraldines)
MF	8	Conor McGinty (O'Raghallaighs)
MF	9	Paul Galvin (Newtown Blues)
RHF	10	Dylan Shevlin (Stabannon Parnells)
CHF	11	Jack Healy (Newtown Blues)
LHF	12	Pearse Grimes-Murphy (St Joseph's)
RCF	13	Adam Gillespie (St Mary's)
FF	14	Seán Flynn (Mattock Rangers)
LCF	15	Shane Lennon (St Mochta's)
Substitutes:
	16	James Corcoran (Roche Emmets)
	17	Liam Brannigan (Newtown Blues)
	18	Cian Farrell (Geraldines)
	19	Donnacha Hodgins (Dreadnots)
	20	Paddy McHugh (Glen Emmets)
	21	Justin Cooney (O'Connells)
	22	Jack O'Leary (St Joseph's)
	23	Robbie Matthews (St Kevin's)
	24	Josh Taaffe (St Mary's)
