= 2014 Meath Intermediate Football Championship =

Meath I.F.C.
- Season: 2014
- Champions: Ballinlough
- Promoted: Ballinlough
- Relegated: Carnaross
- Leinster ICFC: Ballinlough (Final) Seán O'Mahonys 0-10 Ballinlough 1-4,
- All Ireland ICFC: n/a
- Matches: 56

The 2014 Meath Intermediate Football Championship is the 88th edition of the Meath GAA's premier club Gaelic football tournament for intermediate graded teams in County Meath, Ireland. The tournament consists of 18 teams, with the winner going on to represent Meath in the Leinster Intermediate Club Football Championship. The championship starts with a group stage and then progresses to a knock out stage.

The draw for the group stages of the championship were made on 10 February 2014 with the games commencing on the weekend of 11 April 2014.

Drumbaragh Emmets were promoted to the middle grade after securing the J.F.C. crown last year. Kilmainham joined them after finishing as J.F.C. runners-up last year.

This was Nobber's return to the Intermediate grade after 3 years as a senior club since being relegated last year.

Carnaross were relegated to the Junior 'A' championship for 2015 after 15 years in the middle grade since being relegated from the S.F.C. in 1999. In this period they reached two finals losing to Navan O'Mahonys and Nobber in 2003 and 2010 respectively. It was 24 years since Carnaross were last in the Junior grade.

On 5 October 2014, Ballinlough won their third IFC crown, defeating Ballinabrackey in the final and hence ending a seven year exodus from the SFC. They succeeded Gaeil Colmcille as Intermediate champions.

== Team changes ==
The following teams have changed division since the 2013 championship season.

=== From I.F.C. ===
Promoted to S.F.C.

- Gaeil Colmcille - (Intermediate Champions)

=== To I.F.C. ===
Relegated from 2013 S.F.C.

- Nobber

Promoted from 2013 J.F.C.

- Drumbaragh Emmets - (Junior 'A' Champions)
- Kilmainham - (Junior 'A' Runner-Up)

== Participating teams ==
The teams taking part in the 2014 Meath Intermediate Football Championship are:

Club	Location	2013 Championship Position	2014 Championship Position
Ballinabrackey	Ballinabrackey	Non Qualifier	Finalists
Ballinlough	Ballinlough	Non Qualifier	Champions
Ballivor	Ballivor	Non Qualifier	Quarter-Finalist
Donaghmore/Ashbourne 'B'	Ashbourne	Non Qualifier	Non Qualifier
Carnaross	Carnaross	Non Qualifier	Relegated
Castletown	Castletown	Semi-finalist	Semi-finalist
Clann na nGael	Athboy	Finalists	Preliminary Quarter-Finalist
Drumbaragh Emmets	Drumbaragh, Kells	Junior Champions	Non Qualifier
Dunderry	Dunderry	Quarter-finalist	Quarter-finalist
Kilmainham	Kilmainham, Kells	Junior Runners-Up	Relegation Playoff
Longwood	Longwood	Non Qualifier	Non Qualifier
Nobber	Nobber	SFC Relegated	Relegation Playoff
Ratoath	Ratoath	Quarter-finalist	Semi-finalist
St Colmcilles	Laytown	Quarter-finalist	Quarter-finalist
St Michaels	Carlanstown	Semi-finalist	Non Qualifier
St Ultans	Bohermeen	Non Qualifier	Non Qualifier
Syddan	Lobinstown	Non Qualifier	Quarter-Finalist
Trim	St Lomans Park, Trim	Non Qualifier	Non Qualifier

== Group stage ==
There are 3 groups called Group A, B and C. The 2 top finishers in each group and the third place finisher in Group A will qualify for the quarter-finals. The third placed teams in Group B and C will qualify for a Preliminary Quarter-final, with the winner earning a place in last eight. The bottom finishers of each group will qualify for the Relegation Play Off. The draw for the group stages of the championship were made on 10 February 2014 with the games commencing on the weekend of 11 April 2014.

=== Group A ===
Team	Pld	W	L	D	PF	PA	PD	Pts
Dunderry	5	5	0	0	60	49	+11	10
Castletown	5	4	1	0	94	51	+43	8
Ballinabrackey	5	3	2	0	52	55	-3	6
Longwood	5	2	3	0	53	67	-14	4
St. Michael's	5	1	4	0	55	66	-11	2
Kilmainham	5	0	5	0	55	81	-26	0

Round 1

- Kilmainham 0-10, 2-9 Ballinabrackey, Trim, 12/4/2014,
- Castletown 0-17, 1-9 St. Michael's, Kilmainhamwood, 12/4/2014,
- Longwood 1-8, 1-9 Dunderry, Trim, 13/4/2014,

Round 2

- St. Michael's 1-3, 0-9 Longwood, Kildalkey, 19/4/2014,
- Dunderry 0-11, 0-9 Kilmainham, Pairc Tailteann, 19/4/2014,
- Ballinabrackey 0-8, 2-12 Castletown, Athboy, 26/4/2014,

Round 3

- Longwood 0-9, 3-18 Castletown, Bective, 16/5/2014,
- Dunderry 0-10, 0-8 Ballinabrackey, Summerhill, 17/5/2014,
- St. Michael's 1-15, 0-13 Kilmainham, Moynalty, 24/5/2014,

Round 4

- Ballinabrackey 0-10, 0-7 St. Michael's, Trim, 16/8/2014,
- Kilmainham 0-11, 0-14 Longwood, Trim, 16/8/2014,
- Castletown 0-9, 1-7 Dunderry, Bective, 16/8/2014,

Round 5

- Castletown 3-14, 1-9 Kilmainham, Moynalty, 29/8/2014,
- St. Michael's 0-12, 1-14 Dunderry, Kilmainham, 30/8/2014,
- Longwood 1-7, 0-11 Ballinabrackey, Trim, 30/8/2014,

=== Group B ===
Team	Pld	W	L	D	PF	PA	PD	Pts
Syddan	5	3	1	1	80	69	+11	7
St. Colmcille's	5	3	2	0	70	57	+13	6
Ballinlough	5	2	2	1	74	69	+5	5
Trim	5	2	2	1	68	64	+4	5
Drumbaragh Emmets	5	2	3	0	68	88	-20	4
Nobber	5	1	3	1	58	71	-13	3

Round 1

- Drumbaragh Emmets 0-13, 2-14 Trim, Simonstown, 11/4/2014,
- Syddan 2-7, 1-10 Nobber, Drumconrath, 13/4/2014,
- St. Colmcille's 2-8, 0-9 Ballinlough, Castletown, 13/4/2014,

Round 2

- Trim 1-11, 1-12 Syddan, Simomnstown, 20/4/2014,
- Nobber 0-7, 0-14 St. Colmcille's, Donore, 24/4/2014,
- Ballinlough 2-7, 2-15 Drumbaragh Emmets, Moylagh, 27/4/2014,

Round 3

- Trim 0-11, 1-14 St. Colmcille's, Rathkenny, 18/5/2014,
- Syddan 3-16, 1-6 Drumbaragh Emmets, Meath Hill, 23/5/2014,
- Nobber 0-12, 2-15 Ballinlough, Carlanstown, 25/5/2014,

Round 4

- St. Colmcille's 0-12, 0-15 Syddan, Rathkenny, 16/8/2014,
- Drumbaragh Emmets 1-7, 1-14 Nobber, Kilmainhamwood, 17/8/2014,
- Ballinlough 0-10, 0-10 Trim, Bohermeen, 17/8/2014,

Round 5

- Trim 1-10, 0-9 Nobber, Bohermeen, 31/8/2014,
- Syddan 2-6, 1-18 Ballinlough, Carlanstown, 31/8/2014,
- Drumbaragh Emmets 1-12, 0-13 St. Colmcille's, Slane, 31/8/2014,

=== Group C ===
Team	Pld	W	L	D	PF	PA	PD	Pts
Ballivor	5	5	0	0	86	51	+35	10
Ratoath	5	4	1	0	108	59	+49	8
Clann na nGael	5	2	3	0	56	84	-28	4
St. Ultan's	5	2	3	0	65	80	-15	4
Donaghmore/Ashbourne 'B'	5	1	4	0	46	63	-17	2
Carnaross	5	1	4	0	55	79	-24	2

Round 1

- Carnaross 1-7, 2-16 Ballivor, Pairc Tailteann, 12/4/2014,
- Ratoath 4-13, 2-7 St. Ultan's, Walterstown, 13/4/2014,
- Clann na nGael 1-7, 0-8 Donaghmore/Ashbourne 'B', Dunsany, 13/4/2014,

Round 2

- Ballivor 2-10, 2-9 Ratoath, Dunsany, 19/4/2014,
- St. Ultan's 1-12, 4-10 Clann na nGael, Kells, 20/4/2014,
- Donaghmore/Ashbourne 'B' 0-15, 1-8 Carnaross, Trim, 26/4/2014,

Round 3

- Ballivor 0-15, 2-7 St Ultan's, Athboy, 18/5/2014,
- Donaghmore/Ashbourne 'B' 1-3, 2-15 Ratoath, Skryne, 23/5/2014,
- Carnaross 1-9, 0-8 Clann na nGael, Kells, 24/5/2014,

Round 4

- Clann na nGael 0-4, 2-17 Ballivor, Trim, 15/8/2014,
- St Ultan's 0-11, 0-8 Donaghmore/Ashbourne 'B', Seneschalstown, 16/8/2014,
- Ratoath 2-15, 1-9 Carnaross, Trim, 17/8/2014,

Round 5

- Donaghmore/Ashbourne 'B' 0-9, 0-10 Ballivor, Kilmessan, 31/8/2014,
- Carnaross 1-7, 1-10 St Ultan's, Kilmainham, 31/8/2014,
- Clann na nGael 1-9, 3-17 Ratoath, Walterstown, 31/8/2014,

== Knock-out Stages ==
=== Relegation Play Off ===
The three bottom finishers from each group qualify for the relegation play off and play each other in a round robin basis. The team with the worst record after two matches will be relegated to the 2015 Junior Championship.

Team	Pld	W	L	D	PF	PA	PD	Pts
Kilmainham	2	2	0	0	37	29	+8	4
Nobber	2	1	1	0	34	34	+0	2
Carnaross	2	0	2	0	22	30	-8	0

- Game 1: Kilmainham 3-12, 2-14 Nobber, Simonstown, 7/9/2014,
- Game 2: Nobber 0-14, 0-13 Carnaross, Drumbaragh, 14/9/2014,
- Game 3: Carnaross 0-9, 1-13 Kilmainham, Pairc Tailteann, 20/9/2014,

=== Finals ===
The winners and runners up of each group qualify for the quarter-finals along with the third placed finisher of Group A.

Preliminary Quarter-Finals
Ballinlough	1-12
Clann na nGael	0-6

Quarter-Finals
Dunderry	0-11
Ballinlough	1-12
St. Colmcille's	2-11
Castletown	1-18
Syddan	3-14 AET
Ratoath	3-19 AET
Ballivor	0-8
Ballinabrackey	2-12

Semi-Finals
Ballinlough	2-14
Castletown	2-12
Ratoath	1-10
Ballinabrackey	1-11

Final
Ballinlough	1-12
Ballinabrackey	1-9

Preliminary Quarter-Final:

- Ballinlough 1-12, 0-6 Clann na nGael, Millbrook 8/9/2014,

Quarter-final:

- Ballivor 0-8, 2-12 Ballinabrackey, Trim, 13/9/2014,
- Syddan 3-14, 3-19 Ratoath, Pairc Tailteann, 13/9/2014, (A.E.T.)
- Dunderry 0-11, 1-12 Ballinlough, Moylagh, 14/9/2014,
- St. Colmcille's 2-11, 1-18 Castletown, Rathkenny, 14/9/2014,

Semi-finals:

- Ballinlough 2-14, 2-12 Castletown, Pairc Tailteann, 20/9/2014,
- Ratoath 1-10, 1-11 Ballinabrackey, Trim, 21/9/2014,

Final:

- Ballinlough 1-12, 1-9 Ballinabrackey, Pairc Tailteann, 5/10/2014,

== Leinster Intermediate Club Football Championship ==
Preliminary round:

- Ballyfin 0-8, 0-11 Ballinlough, O'Moore Park, 25/10/2014,

Quarter-final

- Ballinlough 0-12, 0-10 Raheen, Pairc Tailteann, 2/11/2014,

Semi-final:

- St. James' 1-3, 0-12 Ballinlough, Wexford Park, 16/11/2014,

Final:

- Seán O'Mahonys 0-10, 1-4 Ballinlough, Drogheda Park, 30/11/2014,
