= 2017 Meath Intermediate Football Championship =

Meath I.F.C.
- Season: 2017
- Promoted: Curraha (1st I.F.C. Title)
- Relegated: Ballivor
- Leinster ICFC: ???
- All Ireland ICFC: ???

The 2017 Meath Intermediate Football Championship is the 91st edition of the Meath GAA's premier club Gaelic football tournament for Intermediate graded teams in County Meath, Ireland. The tournament consists of 18 teams, with the winner going on to represent Meath in the Leinster Intermediate Club Football Championship. The championship starts with a group stage and then progresses to a knock out stage.

The draw for the group stages of the championship were made on 6 March 2017 with the games commencing on the weekend of 20 May 2017.

Bective were promoted to the middle grade after a 16-year exodus when securing the J.F.C. crown in 2016.

This was Ballinlough's return to the Intermediate grade after just 2 years as a senior club since being relegated in 2016.

On 22 October 2017, Curraha won their first ever Meath Intermediate Football Championship by beating St. Michael's 1-17 to 1-7 in the final in Páirc Tailteann. 2017 was only Curraha's second season at intermediate level since winning the 2015 Meath Junior Football Championship. 2018 will be their first ever period as a senior club.

Ballivor were relegated to the 2018 Meath Junior Football Championship after 6 seasons in the middle tier of Meath football.

== Team changes ==
The following teams have changed division since the 2017 championship season.

=== From I.F.C. ===
Promoted to S.F.C.

- St. Colmcille's - (Intermediate Champions)

Relegated to 2017 J.F.C.

- Cortown

=== To I.F.C. ===
Relegated from 2016 S.F.C.

- Ballinlough

Promoted from 2016 J.F.C.

- Bective - (Junior 'A' Champions)

== Participating teams ==
The teams taking part in the 2017 Meath Intermediate Football Championship are:

Club	Location	2016 Championship Position	2017 Championship Position
Ballinabrackey	Ballinabrackey	Semi-Finalist	Preliminary Quarter-Finalist
Ballinlough	Ballinlough & Kilskyre	SFC Relegated	Quarter-Finalist
Ballivor	Ballivor	Non Qualifier	Relegated
Bective	Navan	Junior Champions	Non Qualifier
Castletown	Castletown	Non Qualifier	Non Qualifier
Curraha	Curraha	Quarter-finalist	Champions
Donaghmore/Ashbourne 'B'	Ashbourne	Quarter-Finalist	Quarter-Finalist
Drumbaragh Emmets	Drumbaragh, Kells	Relegation Playoff	Non Qualifier
Dunderry	Dunderry	Finalist	Non Qualifier
Kilmainham	Kilmainham, Kells	Non Qualifier	Quarter-Finalist
Longwood	Longwood	Relegation Play-off	Relegation Play-off
Nobber	Nobber	Non Qualifier	Semi-finalist
Oldcastle	Oldcastle	Preliminary Quarter-finalist	Semi-finalist
St. Michael's	Carlanstown & Kilbeg	Non Qualifier	Finalists
St. Ultan's	Bohermeen	Non Qualifier	Relegation Play-off
Syddan	Lobinstown	Quarter-finalist	Non Qualifier
Trim	St Lomans Park, Trim	Quarter-Finalist	Quarter-Finalist
Walterstown	Johnstown, Navan	Semi-Finalist	Non Qualifier

== Group stage ==
There are 3 groups called Group A, B and C. The 2 top finishers in each group and the third-place finisher in Group A will qualify for the quarter-finals. The third placed teams in Group B and C will qualify for a Preliminary Quarter-final, with the winner earning a place in last eight. The bottom finishers of each group will qualify for the Relegation Play Off.

The draw for the group stages of the championship were made on 8 February 2016 with the games commencing on the weekend of 20 May 2017.

=== Group A ===
Team	Pld	W	L	D	PF	PA	PD	Pts
Ballinlough	5	4	1	0	69	60	+9	8
St. Michael's	5	4	1	0	86	69	+17	8
Trim	5	3	1	1	79	62	+17	7
Dunderry	5	2	2	1	65	66	-1	5
Drumbaragh Emmets	5	1	4	0	61	91	-30	2
Longwood	5	0	5	0	65	77	-12	0

Round 1

- Dunderry 1-17, 2-12 Drumbaragh, Pairc Tailteann, 20/5/2017,
- Trim 0-18, 0-12 Longwood, Kildalkey, 20/5/2017,
- Ballinlough 2-11, 0-16 St. Michael's, Kilmainhamwood, 21/5/2017,

Round 2

- Ballinlough 1-10, 0-9 Drumbaragh, Millbrook, 24/7/2017,
- St. Michael's 1-14, 1-13 Trim, Bohermeen, 25/7/2017,
- Dunderry 0-12, 0-10 Longwood, Kildalkey, 25/7/2017,

Round 3

- Ballinlough 1-9, 0-10 Longwood, Kildalkey, 11/8/2017,
- St. Michael's 2-16, 0-8 Drumbaragh, Carnaross, 11/8/2017,
- Dunderry 0-11, 0-11 Trim, Athboy, 15/8/2017,

Round 4

- Trim 2-14, 1-6 Drumbaragh, Athboy, 27/8/2017,
- St. Michael's 1-15, 1-14 Longwood, Athboy, 27/8/2017,
- Ballinlough 0-14, 0-11 Dunderry, Cortown, 28/8/2017,

Round 5

- Drumbaragh 3-8, 1-13 Longwood, Trim, 9/9/2017,
- Trim 1-11, 1-10 Ballinlough, Pairc Tailteann, 10/9/2017,
- St. Michael's 1-10, 0-11 Dunderry, Cortown, 10/9/2017,

=== Group B ===
Team	Pld	W	L	D	PF	PA	PD	Pts
Curraha	5	3	1	1	86	67	+19	7
Kilmainham	5	3	1	1	74	63	+11	7
Ballinabrackey	5	3	2	0	82	62	+20	6
Bective	5	2	2	1	75	69	+6	5
Castletown	5	2	3	0	80	85	-5	4
Ballivor	5	0	4	1	51	102	-51	1

Round 1

- Ballinabrackey 1-12, 0-12 Bective, Longwood, 19/5/2017,
- Curraha 0-14, 1-9 Kilmainham, Castletown, 19/5/2017,
- Castletown 3-16, 0-7 Ballivor, Kilmainham, 20/5/2017,

Round 2

- Bective 1-12, 2-7 Ballivor, Pairc Tailteann, 11/6/2017,
- Kilmainham 0-13, 0-11 Ballinabrackey, Pairc Tailteann, 23/7/2017,
- Castletown 2-14, 0-19 Curraha, Bective, 25/7/2017,

Round 3

- Bective 5-12, 0-16 Castletown, Pairc Tailteann, 13/8/2017,
- Curraha 2-15, 2-12 Ballinabrackey, Dunsany, 13/8/2017,
- Kilmainham 1-13, 1-13 Ballivor, Athboy, 13/8/2017,

Round 4

- Curraha 1-11, 1-11 Bective, Skryne, 24/8/2017,
- Kilmainham 2-13, 0-12 Castletown, Moynalty, 25/8/2017,
- Ballinabrackey 3-16, 1-6 Ballivor, Longwood, 26/8/2017,

Round 5

- Curraha 2-15, 0-6 Ballivor, Seneschalstown, 10/9/2017,
- Kilmainahm 2-8, 0-10 Bective, Bohermeen, 10/9/2017,
- Ballinabrackey 1-10, 0-7 Castletown, Athboy, 10/9/2017,

=== Group C ===
Team	Pld	W	L	D	PF	PA	PD	Pts
Oldcastle	5	3	0	2	83	64	+19	8
Donaghmore/Ashbourne 'B'	5	2	0	3	81	78	+3	7
Nobber	5	2	1	2	94	87	+7	6
Syddan	5	1	2	2	72	82	-10	4
Walterstown	5	1	3	1	79	84	-5	3
St. Ultan's	5	1	4	0	67	81	-14	2

Round 1

- Walterstown 1-11, 0-10 St. Ultan's, Kilberry, 19/5/2017,
- Oldcastle 3-11, 2-6 Syddan, Carnaross, 20/5/2017,
- Nobber 2-12, 1-15 Donaghmore/Ashbourne 'B', Duleek, 20/5/2017,

Round 2

- Nobber 5-9, 2-13 Walterstown, Pairc Tailteann, 9/6/2017,
- Oldcastle 0-11, 1-8 Donaghmore/Ashbourne 'B', Kilmainham, 10/6/2017,
- St. Ultan's 0-15, 0-10 Syddan, Pairc Tailteann, 11/6/2017,

Round 3

- Donaghmore/Ashbourne 'B' 4-6, 1-14 Walterstown, Slane, 11/8/2017,
- Oldcastle 2-13, 1-8 St. Ultan's, Kilmainham, 11/8/2017,
- Syddan 1-12, 0-12 Nobber, Drumconrath, 13/8/2017,

Round 4

- Nobber 4-12, 4-7 St. Ultan's, Ballinlough, 24/8/2017,
- Syddan 3-11, 2-14 Donaghmore/Ashbourne 'B', Pairc Tailteann, 26/8/2017,
- Oldcastle 2-11, 0-14 Walterstown, Pairc Tailteann, 27/8/2017,

Round 5

- Oldcastle 2-10, 1-13 Nobber, Moynalty, 9/9/2017,
- Walterstown 2-9, 1-12 Syddan, Castletown, 9/9/2017,
- Donaghmore/Ashbourne 'B' 0-14, 1-9 St. Ultan's, Duleek, 9/9/2017,

== Knock-out stages ==
=== Relegation play off ===
The three bottom finishers from each group qualify for the relegation play off and play each other in a round robin basis. The team with the worst record after two matches will be relegated to the 2018 Intermediate Championship.

Team	Pld	W	L	D	PF	PA	PD	Pts
St. Ultan's	2	1	0	1	39	29	+10	3
Longwood	2	1	1	0	25	33	-8	2
Ballivor	2	0	1	1	24	26	-2	1

- Game 1: Longwood 0-11, 1-6 Ballivor, Boardsmill, 23/9/2017,
- Game 2: St. Ultan's 1-12, 0-15 Ballivor, Athboy, 8/10/2017,
- Game 3: St. Ultan's 1-21 1-11 Longwood, Grangegodden, 22/10/2017

== Knock-out stages ==
=== Finals ===
The winners and runners up of each group qualify for the quarter-finals along with the third-placed finisher of Group A.

Preliminary Quarter-Finals
Ballinabrackey	0-9
Nobber	0-10

Quarter-Finals
Ballinlough	1-11
Nobber	0-17
St. Michael's	1-12
Kilmainham	0-12
Curraha	1-13
Donaghmore/Ashbourne 'B'	0-9
Oldcastle	2-13
Trim	1-8

Semi-Finals
Nobber	1-9
St. Michael's	3-14
Curraha	1-12
Oldcastle	2-7

Final
St. Michael's	1-7
Curraha	1-17

Preliminary Quarter-Final:

- Nobber 0-10, 0-9 Ballinabrackey, Skryne, 16/9/2017,

Quarter-finals:

- Curraha 1-13, 0-9 Donaghmore/Ashbourne 'B', Ratoath, 23/9/2017,
- St. Michael's 1-12, 0-12 Kilmainham, Moynalty, 23/9/2017,
- Oldcastle 2-13, 1-8 Trim, Ballinlough, 24/9/2017,
- Nobber 0-17, 1-11 Ballinlough, Carlanstown, 24/9/2017,

Semi-finals:

- St. Michael's 3-14, 1-9 Nobber, Pairc Tailteann, 6/10/2017,
- Curraha 1-12, 2-7 Oldcastle, Pairc Tailteann, 7/10/2017,

Final:

- Curraha 1-17, 1-7 St. Michael's, Pairc Tailteann, 22/10/2017,

== Leinster Intermediate Club Football Championship ==
Quarter-final:

- O'Connell's (Louth) 0-12, 2-7 Curraha, Castlebellingham, 4/11/2017,

Semi-final:

- Ballyboughal 3-7, 0-15 Curraha, Ballyboughal, 18/11/2017,
