= 1968 Meath Senior Football Championship =

Meath S.F.C.
- Season: 1968
- Champions: Gaeil Colmcille; 1st Senior Championship Title
- Relegated: Kilmainhamwood
- Winning Captain: Harry Campbell (Gaeil Colmcille)
- Matches: 40

The 1968 Meath Senior Football Championship is the 76th edition of the Meath GAA's premier club Gaelic football tournament for senior graded teams in County Meath, Ireland. The tournament consists of 13 teams. The championship starts with a group stage and then progresses to a knock out stage.

This season saw Seneschalstown's debut in the top flight after claiming the 1967 Meath Intermediate Football Championship title.

Kilbride were the defending champions after they defeated Navan O'Mahonys in the previous years final, however this year they failed to make it past the group phase.

This season was unique in which both Semi-finals required a 2nd Replay to decide the fixture.

Gaeil Colmcille claimed their 1st S.F.C. title on 14 December 1969 when defeating Walterstown in the final 3–17 to 1–4 at Pairc Tailteann. Harry Campbell raised the Keegan Cup for the Kells outfit.

== Team changes ==
The following teams have changed division since the 1967 championship season.

=== To S.F.C. ===
Promoted from I.F.C.

- Seneschalstown - (Intermediate Champions).
- Oldcastle - (Application to be promoted granted by County Board)

=== From S.F.C. ===
Regraded to I.F.C.

- None

== Group stage ==
=== Group A ===
Team	Pld	W	L	D	PF	PA	PD	Pts
Skryne	6	5	1	0	0	0	+0	10
Navan O'Mahonys	6	4	1	1	0	0	+0	9
Kilbride	6	3	2	1	0	0	+0	7
St. Patrick's	6	3	3	0	0	0	+0	6
St. Vincent's	6	3	3	0	0	0	+0	6
Ballinlough	6	1	5	0	0	0	+0	2
Trim	6	1	5	0	0	0	+0	2

Round 1:

- Navan O'Mahonys d, d Kilbride, Stamullen, 21/4/1968,
- Skryne w, l St. Vincent's, Pairc Tailteann, 5/5/1968,
- St. Patrick's w, l Ballinlough, Pairc Tailteann, 5/5/1968,
- Trim - Bye,

Round 2:

- Skryne 1-7, 0-6 Kilbride, Pairc Tailteann, 19/5/1968,
- Ballinlough 2-11, 1-3 Trim, Kells, 19/5/1968,
- St. Vincent's 0-10, 1-5 Navan O'Mahonys, Skryne, 19/5/1968,
- St. Patrick's - Bye,

Round 3:

- Trim w, l St. Patrick's, Dunshaughlin, 9/6/1968,
- Kilbride 1-10, 0-6 St. Vincent's, Skryne, 16/6/1968,
- Navan O'Mahonys 2-3, 0-8 Skryne, Pairc Tailteann, 23/6/1968,
- Ballinlough - Bye,

Round 4:

- Kilbride 2-6, 1-7 Ballinlough, Pairc Tailteann, 14/7/1968,
- Navan O'Mahonys 2-9, 0-4 Trim, Kells, 14/7/1968,
- St. Patrick's +8, -8 St. Vincent's, Duleek, 14/7/1968,
- Skryne - Bye,

Round 5:

- Skryne 0-15, 2-2 Ballinlough, Kells, 28/7/1968,
- Navan O'Mahonys 1-4, 0-5 St. Patrick's, Skryne, 28/7/1968,
- Kilbride w, l Trim, Dunshaughlin, 28/7/1968,
- St. Vincent's - Bye,

Round 6:

- St. Vincent's w, l Ballinlough, Pairc Tailteann, 4/8/1968,
- St. Patrick's 1-7, 1-5 Kilbride, Skryne, 4/8/1968,
- Skryne w/o, scr Trim, Pairc Tailteann, 25/8/1968,
- Navan O'Mahonys - Bye,

Round 7:

- Skryne 3-11, 0-4 St. Patrick's, Pairc Tailteann, 8/9/1968,
- Navan O'Mahonys w, l Ballinlough,
- St. Vincent's w/o, scr Trim,
- Kilbride - Bye,

=== Group B ===
Team	Pld	W	L	D	PF	PA	PD	Pts
Walterstown	5	4	0	1	0	0	+0	9
Gaeil Colmcille	5	3	1	1	0	0	+0	7
Duleek	5	3	2	0	0	0	+0	6
Seneschalstown	5	2	2	1	0	0	+0	5
Oldcastle	5	1	3	1	0	0	+0	3
Kilmainhamwood	5	0	5	0	0	0	+0	0

Round 1:

- Walterstown 0–8, 1-5 Seneschalstown Pairc Tailteann, 21/4/1968,
- Gaeil Colmcille 2-8, 0-5 Kilmainhamwood, Gibbstown, 21/4/1968,
- Duleek 3-4, 3-3 Oldcastle, Kells, 21/4/1968,

Round 2:

- Walterstown w/o, scr Kilmainhamwood, Kells, 28/4/1968,
- Duleek w, l Seneschalstown, Skryne, 5/5/1968,
- Gaeil Colmcille 1–7, 2-4 Oldcastle, Athboy, 12/5/1968,

Round 3:

- Walterstown w, l Gaeil Colmcille, Pairc Tailteann, 19/5/1968,
- Duleek w, l Kilmainhamwood, Gibbstown, 19/5/1968,
- Seneschalstown w, l Oldcastle, Athboy, 19/5/1968,

Round 4:

- Oldcastle w/o, scr Kilmainhamwood, Kells, 9/6/1968,
- Walterstown 2-9, 0-11 Duleek, Stamullen, 9/6/1968,
- Gaeil Colmcille w, l Seneschalstown, Pairc Tailteann, 16/6/1968,

Round 5:

- Walterstown +2, -2 Oldcastle, Kells, 16/6/1968,
- Gaeil Colmcille 2-9, 1-4 Duleek, Pairc Tailteann, 14/7/1968,
- Seneschalstown w/o, scr Kilmainhamwood,

== Knock-out Stages ==
The winners and runners up of each group qualify for the semi-finals.

Semi-finals
1	Skryne	1-5
4	Gaeil Colmcille	2-7 (2R)
3	Walterstown	2-8 (2R)
2	Navan O'Mahonys	2-5 (2R)

Final
Gaeil Colmcille	3-17
Walterstown	1-4

Semi-finals:

- Gaeil Colmcille 1–4, 0-7 Skryne, Pairc Tailteann, 15/9/1968,
- Walterstown 0–8, 1-8 Navan O'Mahonys, Kells, 15/9/1968, (Abandoned)

Semi-final Replay:

- Gaeil Colmcille 0–7, 0-7 Skryne, Pairc Tailteann, 29/9/1968,
- Walterstown 4–6, 2-12 Navan O'Mahonys, Kells, 10/11/1968,

Semi-final Second Replay:

- Gaeil Colmcille 2-7, 1-5 Skryne, Pairc Tailteann, 10/11/1968,
- Walterstown 2-8, 2-6 Navan O'Mahonys, Kells, 31/11/1968,

Final:

- Gaeil Colmcille 3-17, 1-4 Walterstown, Pairc Tailteann, 2/3/1969,
- The first semi-final between Walterstown and Navan O'Mahonys became known as "The Kells Affair" when the match was abandoned after 45 minutes by referee Tom Browne from the Martry club. A Walterstown player had been sent off for a kicking incident after which a free for all ensued with Walterstown players attacking O'Mahonys players and also a subsequent crowd invasion who engaged with players from both sides on the pitch.

At a County Board meeting on Monday 23 September, O'Mahonys and Walterstown delegates laid the blame on each other. The Board decided to interview neutral delegates present at the match and these were brought forward to the County Board meeting on Monday 30 September in the C.Y.M.S. Hall in Navan. After two hours of unrelenting discussion, no final decision was made relating to the incidents which occurred. On Monday 4 November however, County Board delegates chose not to disqualify Walterstown from the competition and the match was refixed. All of these event came after a Feis Cup match between the sides the previous year at Kilmessan on 16 April 1967 was abandoned due to a melee on the pitch after a Walterstown player received his marching orders for striking, in which the points were later awarded to the Navan O'Mahonys men.
