= 2016 Meath Intermediate Football Championship =

Meath I.F.C.
- Season: 2016
- Promoted: St. Colmcille's (2nd I.F.C. Title)
- Relegated: Cortown
- Leinster ICFC: St. Colmcille's (Final) St. Colmcille's 0-13, 1-9 Rosemount
- All Ireland ICFC: ???

The 2016 Meath Intermediate Football Championship is the 90th edition of the Meath GAA's premier club Gaelic football tournament for Intermediate graded teams in County Meath, Ireland. The tournament consists of 18 teams, with the winner going on to represent Meath in the Leinster Intermediate Club Football Championship. The championship starts with a group stage and then progresses to a knock out stage.

The draw for the group stages of the championship were made on 8 February 2016 with the games commencing on the weekend of 9 April 2016.

Curraha were promoted to the middle grade after an 11-year exodus when securing the J.F.C. crown last year.

This was Walterstown's return to the Intermediate grade after 51 years as a senior club since being relegated last year.

Cortown were relegated to the 2017 J.F.C. after just 2 years as an Intermediate club.

On 22 October 2016, St. Colmcille's claimed their 2nd I.F.C. title when defeating Dunderry 1-12 to 1-6 in the final replay in Pairc Tailteann. After 3 minutes of the first match in the final, St. Colmcille's and Meath star Graham Reilly was sent off and was subsequently suspended for the final replay which made the seaside club's achievement even more commendable. The victory marked their return to the top flight after a 20 season absence. After winning the Meath I.F.C. St. Colmcille's also made history by winning their first Leinster Intermediate Club Football Championship and became only the third Meath club to win this honour after Wolfe Tones in 2004 and Ratoath the previous season. They beat Rosemount of Westmeath in the final.

== Intermediate Championship Format Change Proposals Rejected ==
Due to the lack of success of the Meath Senior football team in the previous few years, it was proposed to make the club championships more competitive by reducing the number of teams in each tier of the championship and then the number of teams in each group to provide more 'do-or-die' matches which in turn would provide more competitiveness. On 18 January, the decision was made to cut the number of Senior clubs to 16 in 2017. This means that 3 of the 18 clubs would be relegated at the end of the 2016 season while the 2016 I.F.C. champions would make up the top 16. 5 teams would be relegated to the J.F.C. from the I.F.C. with the J.F.C. champions making up the 16 I.F.C. teams for 2017. In 2017, the 16 teams will compete in 4 groups of 4.

However on 21 March, a proposal from the Slane club to retain the status-quo format was accepted by 40 to 14 votes.

== Team changes ==
The following teams have changed division since the 2015 championship season.

=== From I.F.C. ===
Promoted to S.F.C.

- Ratoath - (Intermediate Champions)

Relegated to 2015 J.F.C.

- Clann na nGael

=== To I.F.C. ===
Relegated from 2013 S.F.C.

- Walterstown

Promoted from 2014 J.F.C.

- Curraha - (Junior 'A' Champions)

== Participating teams ==
The teams taking part in the 2016 Meath Intermediate Football Championship are:

Club	Location	PreC'ship Odds	2015 Championship Position	2016 Championship Position
Ballinabrackey	Ballinabrackey	7/1	Quarter-Finalist	Semi-Finalist
Ballivor	Ballivor	18/1	Non Qualifier	Non Qualifier
Castletown	Castletown	9/1	Quarter-Finalist	Non Qualifier
Cortown	Bohermeen	33/1	Non Qualifier	Relegated
Curraha	Curraha	14/1	Junior Champions	Quarter-Finalist
Donaghmore/Ashbourne 'B'	Ashbourne	33/1	Non Qualifier	Quarter-Finalist
Drumbaragh Emmets	Drumbaragh, Kells	25/1	Relegation Playoff	Relegation Playoff
Dunderry	Dunderry	16/1	Non Qualifier	Finalist
Kilmainham	Kilmainham, Kells	14/1	Quarter-finalist	Non Qualifier
Longwood	Longwood	33/1	Non Qualifier	Relegation Play-off
Nobber	Nobber	6/1	Finalists	Non Qualifier
Oldcastle	Oldcastle	10/1	Non Qualifier	Preliminary Quarter-finalist
St. Colmcille's	Laytown	7/2	Semi-finalist	Champions
St. Michael's	Carlanstown	14/1	Quarter-finalist	Non Qualifier
St. Ultan's	Bohermeen	33/1	Relegation Playoff	Non Qualifier
Syddan	Lobinstown	14/1	Preliminary Quarter-finalist	Quarter-Finalist
Trim	St Lomans Park, Trim	6/1	Semi-finalist	Quarter-Finalist
Walterstown	Johnstown, Navan	9/1	SFC Relegated	Semi-Finalist

== Group stage ==
There are 3 groups called Group A,B and C. The 2 top finishers in each group and the third-place finisher in Group A will qualify for the quarter-finals. The third placed teams in Group B and C will qualify for a Preliminary Quarter-final, with the winner earning a place in last eight. The bottom finishers of each group will qualify for the Relegation Play Off.

The draw for the group stages of the championship were made on 8 February 2016 with the games commencing on the weekend of 9 April 2016.

=== Group A ===
Team	Pld	W	L	D	PF	PA	PD	Pts
St. Colmcille's	5	5	0	0	109	58	+51	10
Syddan	5	3	2	0	68	79	-11	6
Ballinabrackey	5	2	2	1	75	57	+18	5
Ballivor	5	2	2	1	71	75	-4	5
Nobber	5	1	4	0	73	92	-19	2
Cortown	5	1	4	0	45	80	-35	2

Round 1

- St. Colmcille's 5-14, 1-8 Syddan, Simonstown, 8/4/2016,
- Cortown 0-13, 1-9 Ballivor, Athboy, 9/4/2016,
- Ballinabrackey 3-8, 0-14 Nobber, Pairc Tailteann, 17/4/2016,

Round 2

- St. Colmcille's 0-16, 1-10 Ballinabrackey, Bective, 13/5/2016,
- Nobber 0-15, 0-13 Cortown, Moynalty, 15/5/2016,
- Ballivor 3-11, 2-11 Syddan, Cortown, 8/7/2016,

Round 3

- Syddan 1-8, 0-7 Cortown, Moynalty, 7/8/2016,
- St. Colmcille's 4-15, 1-13 Nobber, Slane, 7/8/2016,
- Ballinabrackey 1-2, 1-2 Ballivor, Longwood, 7/8/2016,

Round 4

- St. Colmcille's 2-17, 2-7 Ballivor, Pairc Tailteann, 14/8/2016,
- Syddan 0-14, 0-11 Nobber, Kilmainhamwood, 14/8/2016,
- Ballinabrackey 4-16, 0-7 Cortown, Athboy, 14/8/2016,

Round 5

- Ballivor 3-12, 2-11 Nobber, Athboy, 21/8/2016,
- Syddan 2-9, 1-9 Ballinabrackey, Trim, 21/8/2016,
- St. Colmcille's 0-14, 0-5 Cortown, Seneschalstown, 21/8/2016,

=== Group B ===
Team	Pld	W	L	D	PF	PA	PD	Pts
Trim	5	4	1	0	123	63	+60	8
Walterstown	5	3	1	1	124	81	+43	7
Oldcastle	5	4	1	0	83	89	-6	6
Castletown	5	2	2	1	77	72	+5	5
St. Ultan's	5	1	4	0	58	112	-54	2
Longwood	5	0	5	0	68	116	-48	0

Round 1

- Oldcastle 0-19, 2-11 Walterstown, Kilmainham, 9/4/2016,
- Castletown 0-13, 0-8 Longwood, Pairc Tailteann, 10/4/2016,
- Trim 2-20, 0-10 St. Ultan's, Kilmainham, 10/4/2016,

Round 2

- Oldcastle 3-10, 2-10 Castletown, Carnaross, 14/5/2016,
- Walterstown 3-12, 1-16 Trim, Castletown, 30/7/2016,
- St. Ultan's 1-14, 1-12 Longwood, Pairc Tailteann, 30/7/2016,

Round 3

- Trim 6-16, 1-11 Longwood, Summerhill, 7/8/2016,
- Oldcastle 2-16, 0-11 St. Ultan's, Pairc Tailteann, 7/8/2016,
- Castletown 2-13, 1-16 Walterstown, Rathkenny, 7/8/2016,

Round 4

- Walterstown 4-27, 1-11 Longwood, Summerhill, 13/8/2016,
- Trim 4-16, 0-10 Oldcastle, Pairc Tailteann, 13/8/2016,
- Castletown 4-19, 1-7 St. Ultan's, Carlanstown, 14/8/2016,

Round 5

- Walterstown 2-22, 0-10 St. Ultan's, Rathkenny, 21/8/2016,
- Longwood 3-8, 1-10 Oldcastle, Kildalkey, 21/8/2016,
- Trim 0-16, 0-8 Castletown, Pairc Tailteann, 21/8/2016,

=== Group C ===
Team	Pld	W	L	D	PF	PA	PD	Pts
Donaghmore/Ashbourne 'B'	5	4	1	0	74	58	+16	8
Dunderry	5	3	1	1	61	58	+3	7
Curraha	5	3	2	0	75	67	+8	6
St. Michael's	5	3	2	0	78	78	+0	6
Kilmainham	5	1	4	0	73	76	-3	2
Drumbaragh Emmets	5	0	4	1	58	82	-24	1

Round 1

- Dunderry 2-5, 0-9 Curraha, Summerhill, 9/4/2016,
- Donaghmore/Ashbourne 'B' 2-12, 1-6 Kilmainham, Walterstown, 17/4/2016,
- St. Michael's 1-10, 1-6 Drumbaragh, Pairc Tailteann, 23/4/2016,

Round 2

- Donaghmore/Ashbourne 'B' 1-11, 0-12 Drumbaragh, Pairc Tailteann, 15/5/2016,
- Curraha 4-12, 2-8 St. Michael's, Rathkenny, 15/5/2016,
- Dunderry 1-10, 2-6 Kilmainham, Athboy, 29/7/2016,

Round 3

- St. Michael's 2-16, 2-13 Kilmainham, Pairc Tailteann, 6/8/2016,
- Donaghmore/Ashbourne 'B' 0-12, 0-8 Dunderry, Skryne, 7/8/2016,
- Curraha 1-15, 2-7 Drumbaragh, Bohermeen, 21/8/2016,

Round 4

- Curraha 1-10, 0-10 Kilmainham, Pairc Tailteann, 13/8/2016,
- St. Michael's 2-12, 0-11 Donaghmore/Ashbourne 'B', Seneschalstown, 13/8/2016,
- Drumbaragh 1-11, 0-14 Dunderry, Kilmainham, 14/8/2016,

Round 5

- Dunderry 2-9, 0-11 St. Michael's, Cortown, 2/9/2016,
- Donaghmore/Ashbourne 'B' 4-7, 0-11 Curraha, Skryne, 2/9/2016,
- Kilmainham 2-17, 0-10 Drumbaragh, Kells, 3/9/2016,

== Knock-out Stages ==
=== Relegation Play Off ===
The three bottom finishers from each group qualify for the relegation play off and play each other in a round robin basis. The team with the worst record after two matches will be relegated to the 2017 Intermediate Championship.

Team	Pld	W	L	D	PF	PA	PD	Pts
Longwood	2	1	1	0	32	23	+9	2
Drumbaragh Emmets	2	1	1	0	31	34	-3	2
Cortown	2	1	1	0	21	27	-6	2

- Game 1: Cortown 0-10, 0-9 Longwood, Simonstown, 17/9/2016,
- Game 2: Longwood 3-14, 1-10 Drumbaragh, Brews Hill, 23/9/2016,
- Game 3: Drumbaragh 2-12, 1-8 Cortown, Carnaross, 2/10/2016,

== Knock-out Stages ==
=== Finals ===
The winners and runners up of each group qualify for the quarter-finals along with the third placed finisher of Group A.

Preliminary Quarter-Finals
Oldcastle	1-15 (A.E.T.)
Curraha	2-15 (A.E.T.)

Quarter-Finals
St. Colmcille's	1-17
Curraha	1-11
Syddan	0-11
Walterstown	0-14
Trim	0-7
Dunderry	2-9
Donaghmore/Ashbourne 'B'	1-7
Ballinabrackey	0-11

Semi-Finals
St. Colmcille's	2-19 (A.E.T.)
Walterstown	0-16 (A.E.T.)
Dunderry	1-12
Ballinabrackey	0-10

Final
St. Colmcille's	0-12; 1-12
Dunderry	0-12; 1-6

Preliminary Quarter-Final:

- Curraha 2-15, 1-15 Oldcastle, Moynalty, 16/9/2016, (A.E.T.)

Quarter-finals:

- Ballinabrackey 0-11, 1-7 Donaghmore/Ashbourne 'B', Dunganny, 23/9/2016,
- Walterstown 0-14, 0-11 Syddan, Pairc Tailteann, 24/9/2016,
- Dunderry 2-9, 0-7 Trim, Athboy, 24/9/2016,
- St. Colmcille's 1-17, 1-11 Curraha, Duleek, 25/9/2016,

Semi-finals:

- Dunderry 1-12, 0-10 Ballinabrackey, Pairc Tailteann, 2/10/2016,
- St. Colmcille's 2-19, 0-16 Walterstown, Pairc Tailteann, 2/10/2016, (A.E.T.)

Final:

- St. Colmcille's 0-12, 0-12 Dunderry, Pairc Tailteann, 16/10/2016,
- St. Colmcille's 1-12, 1-6 Dunderry, Pairc Tailteann, 22/10/2016, (Replay)

== Leinster Intermediate Club Football Championship ==
Quarter-final:

- Arklow Geraldine's Ballymoney 2-10, 1-16 St. Colmcille's, Pearse Park, 5/11/2016,

Semi-final:

- Round Towers 1-7, 1-9 St. Colmcille's, Kildare, 12/11/2016,

Final:

- St. Colmcille's 0-13, 1-9 Rosemount, Pairc Tailteann, 26/11/2016,

== All-Ireland Intermediate Club Football Championship ==
Semi-final:

- St. Colmcille's 3-11, 2-13 Pomeroy Plunketts, Athletic Grounds, 29/1/2017,

Final:

- St. Colmcille's -vs- Westport, Croke Park, 19/2/2017.
