= Gerry Reilly Cup =

Annual Gaelic football competition in Leinster, Ireland

Gerry Reilly Memorial Cup
- Founded: 1989
- Title holders: Louth (2nd title)
- First winner: Meath
- Most titles: Meath (9 titles)
- Sponsors: Dromone Engineering

The Gerry Reilly Memorial under-16 Inter-County Football Tournament is an annual juvenile Gaelic football held in County Meath, Ireland. The tournament was started in 1989 and is named after Gerry Reilly, a young Gaelic footballer who was killed in December 1987 at the age of sixteen. The trophy is presented each year to the winning team captain by his relatives. The tournament is hosted by Oldcastle GFC.

== Format ==
The tournament consists of two groups of teams. Two points are awarded for a win and one point for a draw. The top two teams in each group qualify for the semi-finals.

== Roll of honour ==
| | Team | Wins | Years won |
|---|---|---|---|
| 1 | Meath | 9 | 1989, 1991, 1995, 1996, 2002, 2003, 2007, 2018, 2019 |
| 2 | Westmeath | 8 | 1990, 1992, 1994, 1999, 2000, 2001, 2010, 2011 |
| 3 | Cavan | 7 | 1997, 2004, 2005, 2014, 2015, 2016, 2023 |
| 4 | Dublin | 6 | 1993, 1998, 2006, 2008 (U17 Blitz), 2012, 2013 |
| 5 | Louth | 2 | 2022, 2025 |
| 6 | Kildare | 1 | 2024 |
| 6 | Mayo | 1 | 2021 |
| 6 | Monaghan | 1 | 2017 |

- No tournament in 2009.
