= 2013 Meath Intermediate Football Championship =

Meath I.F.C.
- Season: 2013
- Champions: Gaeil Colmcille
- Promoted: Gaeil Colmcille
- Relegated: n/a
- Leinster ICFC: Gaeil Colmcille (Quarter-final); Ballyroan Abbey 2-11, Gaeil Colmcille 0-13.
- All Ireland ICFC: n/a
- Matches: 41

The 2013 Meath Intermediate Football Championship is the 87th edition of the Meath GAA's premier club Gaelic football tournament for intermediate graded teams in County Meath, Ireland. The tournament consists of 16 teams, with the winner going on to represent Meath in the Leinster Intermediate Club Football Championship. The championship starts with a group stage and then progresses to a knock out stage.

The draw for the group stages of the championship were made on 11 February 2013 with the games commencing on the weekend of 12 April 2013.

Ratoath returned to the middle grade for the first time since 2007 after securing the J.F.C. crown last year, their fourth period as an Intermediate side. Donaghmore/Ashbourne's second string joined them after finishing as J.F.C. runners-up last year. This was the first time that the Ashbourne club had a second team in the Intermediate grade.

No team was relegated from the Senior grade to the Intermediate grade.

On 13 October 2013, Gaeil Colmcille claimed their 2nd Intermediate championship title when they defeated Clann na nGael 0-18 to 0-5, succeeding Na Fianna as Intermediate champions.

There was no relegation from this grade in 2013.

== Team changes ==
The following teams have changed division since the 2012 championship season.

=== From I.F.C. ===
Promoted to I.F.C.

- Na Fianna - (Intermediate Champions)

=== To I.F.C. ===
Promoted from 2012 Meath Junior Football Championship

- Ratoath - (Junior 'A' Champions)
- Donaghmore/Ashbourne 'B' - (Junior 'A' Runner-Up)

== Participating teams ==
The teams taking part in the 2013 Meath Intermediate Football Championship are:

Club	Location	2012 Championship Position	2013 Championship Position
Ballinabrackey	Ballinabrackey	Semi-finalist	Non Qualifier
Ballinlough	Ballinlough	Quarter-finalist	Non Qualifier
Ballivor	Ballivor	Non Qualifier	Non Qualifier
Donaghmore/Ashbourne 'B'	Ashbourne	Junior 'A' Runner-Up	Non Qualifier
Carnaross	Carnaross	Non Qualifier	Non Qualifier
Castletown	Castletown	Semi-finalist	Semi-finalist
Clann na nGael	Athboy	Non Qualifier	Finalists
Dunderry	Dunderry	Non Qualifier	Quarter-finalist
Gaeil Colmcille	Kells	Non Qualifier	Champions
Longwood	Longwood	Non Qualifier	Non Qualifier
Ratoath	Ratoath	Junior 'A' Champions	Quarter-finalist
St Colmcilles	Laytown	Non Qualifier	Quarter-finalist
St Michaels	Carlanstown	Quarter-finalist	Semi-finalist
St Ultans	Bohermeen	Non Qualifier	Non Qualifier
Syddan	Lobinstown	Non Qualifier	Non Qualifier
Trim	St Lomans Park, Trim	Finalists	Non Qualifier

== Intermediate championship proposals ==
- 2013: In the 2013 Intermediate championship, there will be 16 teams of one groups of 6 teams and two groups of 5 teams. There will once again be no relegation to the Junior championship and one team will be promoted to the Senior championship. One team will be relegated from Senior to Intermediate and the Junior championship finalists will be promoted, leaving 18 Intermediate teams for the start of the 2014 campaign.
- 2014: Three groups of 6 teams with the top 3 from each group qualifying for the knock-out stages.

== Group stage ==
There are 3 groups called Group A, B and C. The top team in Group A qualifies for a Semi-final. The 2nd and 3rd teams in Group A along with the two top finishers in Group B and C will qualify for the Quarter-finals stage of the tournament. The draw for the group stages of the championship were made on 11 February 2013.

=== Group A ===
Team	Pld	W	L	D	PF	PA	PD	Pts
Clann na nGael	5	3	1	1	50	46	+4	7
St. Michaels	5	3	2	0	54	45	+9	6
Dunderry	5	3	2	0	56	45	+11	6
St. Ultans	5	3	2	0	49	57	-8	6
Syddan	5	2	3	0	60	60	+0	4
Carnaross	5	0	4	1	47	63	-16	1

Round 1

- St. Ultans 1-3, 0-13 St. Michael's , Carnaross, 12/4/2013,
- Clann na nGael 0-7, 0-7 Carnaross, Moylagh, 13/4/2013,
- Syddan 1-8, 1-13 Dunderry, Kilberry, 14/4/2013,

Round 2

- Dunderry 1-9, 0-8 St. Ultan's, Kells, 28/4/2013,
- St. Michael's 0-8, 0-10 Clann na nGael, Cortown, 28/4/2013,
- Carnaross 0-12, 0-14 Syddan, Meath Hill, 4/5/2013,

Round 3

- Clann na nGael 1-6, 0-10 St. Ultan's, Trim, 31/5/2013,
- Carnaross 1-4, 0-11 Dunderry, Millbrook, 1/6/2013,
- St. Michael's 0-11, 2-11 Syddan, Drumconrath, 3/6/2013,

Round 4

- St. Ultan's 1-13, 2-9 Carnaross, Kilmainham, 15/8/2013,
- Syddan 0-10, 1-9 Clann na nGael, Kilmainham, 18/8/2013,
- Dunderry 0-6, 0-7 St. Michael's, Simonstown, 18/8/2013,

Round 5

- St. Michael's 1-12, 0-6 Carnaross, Meath Hill, 30/8/2013,
- Clann na nGael 1-9, 1-8 Dunderry, Cortown, 30/8/2013,
- St. Ultan's 0-9, 0-8 Syddan, Carlanstown, 30/8/2013,

=== Group B ===
Team	Pld	W	L	D	PF	PA	PD	Pts
St. Colmcilles	4	4	0	0	43	31	+12	8
Gaeil Colmcille	4	3	1	0	52	41	+11	6
Donaghmore/Ashbourne 'B'	4	2	2	0	50	52	-2	4
Trim	4	1	3	0	45	58	-13	2
Longwood	4	0	4	0	33	41	-8	0

Round 1

- St. Colmcille's 1-10, 0-9 Gaeil Colmcille, Simonstown, 14/4/2013,
- Trim 1-11, 0-12 Longwood, Summerhill, 20/4/2013,
- Donaghmore/Ashbourne 'B' - Bye

Round 2

- Donaghmore/Ashbourne 'B' 1-7, 2-10 St. Colmcille's, Stamullen, 23/4/2013,
- Gaeil Colmcille 1-12, 0-8 Trim, Simonstown, 26/4/2013,
- Longwood - Bye

Round 3

- Trim 0-11, 2-11 Donaghmore/Ashbourne B, Dunderry, 3/6/2013,
- Longwood 0-10, 3-5 Gaeil Colmcille, Dunderry, 5/7/2013,
- St. Colmcille's - Bye

Round 4

- St. Colmcille's 0-14, 1-9 Trim, Ratoath, 17/8/2013,
- Donaghmore/Ashbourne 'B' 2-7, 1-8 Longwood, Ratoath, 17/8/2013,
- Gaeil Colmcille - Bye

Round 5

- Longwood scr, w/o St. Colmcille's, Dunsany, 31/8/2013,
- Gaeil Colmcille 1-11, 2-4 Donaghmore/Ashbourne 'B', Pairc Tailteann, 31/8/2013,
- Trim - Bye

=== Group C ===
Team	Pld	W	L	D	PF	PA	PD	Pts
Ratoath	4	4	0	0	66	43	+23	8
Castletown	4	3	1	0	64	38	+26	6
Ballinabrackey	4	2	2	0	46	40	+6	4
Ballinlough	4	1	3	0	42	60	-18	2
Ballivor	4	0	4	0	37	72	-35	0

Round 1

- Castletown 3-5, 3-9 Ratoath, Skryne, 14/4/2013
- Ballivor 0-14, 3-9 Ballinlough, Kells, 20/4/2013
- Ballinabrackey - Bye

Round 2

- Ballinabrackey 0-8, 1-7 Castletown, Trim, 20/4/2013,
- Ratoath 0-16, 1-9 Ballivor, Bective, 25/4/2013,
- Ballinlough - Bye

Round 3

- Ballinlough 0-6, 2-11 Ratoath, Castletown, 31/5/2013,
- Ballivor 0-6, 0-12 Ballinabrackey, Boardsmill, 2/6/2013,
- Castletown - Bye

Round 4

- Ballinabrackey 2-9, 0-9 Ballinlough, Kildalkey, 17/8/2013,
- Castletown 3-17, 0-5 Ballivor, Athboy, 18/8/2013,
- Ratoath - Bye

Round 5

- Ballinlough 0-9, 1-11 Castletown, Carnaross, 27/8/2013,
- Ratoath 2-9, 0-11 Ballinabrackey, Longwood, 27/8/2013,
- Ballivor -vs- Bye.

== Finals ==
The top team in Group A qualifies for a Semi-final. The 2nd and 3rd teams in Group A along with the two top finishers in Group B and C will qualify for the Quarter-finals stage of the tournament.

Quarter-finals
St. Colmcille's	1-11
St. Michael's	2-9
Ratoath	2-7
Gaeil Colmcille	1-12
Castletown	0-11
Dunderry	0-7

Semi-finals
Clann na nGael	1-13 (AET)
St. Michael's	1-12 AET
Gaeil Colmcille	2-13
Castletown	0-15

Final
Clann na nGael	0-5
Gaeil Colmcille	0-18

Quarter-finals:

- St. Colmcille's 1-11, 2-9 St. Michael's, Seneschalstown, 14/9/2013,
- Ratoath 2-7, 1-12 Gaeil Colmcille, Pairc Tailteann, 15/9/2013,
- Castletown 0-11, 0-7 Dunderry, Simonstown, 15/9/2013,

Semi-finals:

- Clann na nGael 1-13, 1-12 St. Michael's, Pairc Tailteann, 29/9/2013, (AET)
- Gaeil Colmcille 2-13, 0-15 Castletown, Pairc Tailteann, 29/9/2013,

Final:

- Clann na nGael 0-5, 0-18 Gaeil Colmcille, Pairc Tailteann, 13/10/2013,

== Leinster Intermediate Club Football Championship ==
Quarter-final:

- Ballyroan Abbey 2-11, 0-13 Gaeil Colmcille, Crettyard, 3/11/2013,
