= Gary O'Brien =

Irish Gaelic footballer

Personal information
- Native name: Garraí Ó Briain (Irish)
- Born: Navan, County Meath

Sport
- Sport: Gaelic football
- Position: Right corner back
Club
- Years: Club
- Navan O'Mahoneys
Club titles
- Meath titles: 1
Inter-county
- Years: County
- 2010-present: Meath
Inter-county titles
- Leinster titles: 1
- All Stars: 0

Gary O'Brien is an Irish Gaelic footballer. He plays at senior level for the Meath county team.
