= 2013 Meath Senior Football Championship =

Meath S.F.C.
- Season: 2013
- Champions: Summerhill; 7th Senior Championship Title
- Relegated: Nobber
- Leinster SCFC: Summerhill (Semi-Final) St. Vincent's 1-14 Summerhill 1-10,
- All Ireland SCFC: n/a
- Winning Captain: Brian Ennis (Summerhill)
- Man of the Match: Conor Gillespie (Summerhill)
- Matches: 56

The 2013 Meath Senior Football Championship is the 121st edition of the Meath GAA's premier club Gaelic football tournament for senior graded teams in County Meath, Ireland, and also the 60th anniversary of the first use of the Keegan Cup, won by Navan O'Mahonys first in 1954. The tournament consists of 18 teams, with the winner going on to represent Meath in the Leinster Senior Club Football Championship. The championship starts with a group stage and then progresses to a knock out stage.

Navan O'Mahonys were the defending champions after they defeated Wolfe Tones in the previous years final, but were knocked out by Summerhill at the quarter-final stage.

This was Na Fianna's first year ever in the senior grade after claiming the 2012 Meath Intermediate Football Championship title.

Nobber were relegated after 3 years as a senior club. Nobber appealed to the Leinster Council after their match with Oldcastle on the basis that the Meath County Board chose them to play Dunshaughlin first after Nobber drew with Oldcastle, even though the loser of the game was meant to play Dunshaughlin next. When Dunshaughlin defeated Nobber, this left Dunshaughlin safe from relegation with nothing to play for against Oldcastle and hence, were defeated. On 30 September, the Leinster Council rejected Nobber's appeal and they lost their senior status.

On 20 October 2013, Summerhill GFC claimed their 7th Senior Championship title, when defeating Na Fianna 1–13 to 1–10 in Pairc Tailteann, Navan. The match was broadcast live on Irish television station TG4. Brian Ennis raised the Keegan Cup for Summerhill while Conor Gillespie claimed the 'Man of the Match' award.

The draw for the group stages of the championship were made on 11 February 2013 with the games commencing on the weekend of 12 April 2013.

== Team changes ==
The following teams have changed division since the 2012 championship season.

=== To S.F.C. ===
Promoted from I.F.C.

- Na Fianna - (Intermediate Champions)

== Participating teams ==
The teams taking part in the 2013 Meath Senior Football Championship are:

Club	Location	2012 Championship Position	2013 Championship Position
Blackhall Gaels	Batterstown	Non Qualifier	Non Qualifier
Donaghmore/Ashbourne	Ashbourne	Semi-finalist	Non Qualifier
Duleek/Bellewstown	Duleek	Non Qualifier	Non Qualifier
Dunshaughlin	Dunshaughlin	Non Qualifier	Relegation Playoff
Moynalvey	Moynalvey	Non Qualifier	Quarter-Finalist
Na Fianna	Enfield	Intermediate Champions	Finalists
Navan O'Mahonys	Navan	Champions	Quarter-finalist
Nobber	Nobber	Non Qualifier	Relegated
Oldcastle	Oldcastle	Non Qualifier	Relegation Playoff
Rathkenny	Rathkenny	Non Qualifier	Semi-finalist
Seneschalstown	Kentstown	Semi-finalist	Quarter-finalist
Simonstown Gaels	Navan	Quarter-finalist	Non Qualifier
Skryne	Skryne	Non Qualifier	Quarter-Finalist
St Patricks	Stamullen	Quarter-finalist	Non Qualifier
St Peters Dunboyne	Dunboyne	Quarter-finalist	Preliminary Quarter-Finalist
Summerhill	Summerhill	Quarter-finalist	Champions
Walterstown	Navan	Non Qualifier	Non Qualifier
Wolfe Tones	Kilberry	Finalist	Semi-Finalist

== Group stage ==
There are 3 groups called Group A, B and C. The 2 top finishers in each group and the third-place finisher in Group A will qualify for the quarter-finals. The third placed teams in Group B and C will qualify for a Preliminary Quarter-final, with the winner earning a place in last eight. The bottom finishers of each group will qualify for the Relegation Play Off. The draw for the group stages of the championship were made on 11 February 2013 with the games commencing on the weekend of 12 April 2013.

=== Group A ===
Team	Pld	W	L	D	PF	PA	PD	Pts
Navan O'Mahonys	5	5	0	0	90	33	+57	10
Seneschalstown	5	3	1	1	74	46	+28	7
Moynalvey	5	3	2	0	65	55	+9	6
Duleek/Bellewstown	5	1	2	2	54	64	-10	4
Walterstown	5	1	3	1	54	84	-30	3
Nobber	5	0	5	0	38	92	-54	0

Round 1

- Nobber 0–8, 3-7 Walterstown, Rathkenny, 14/4/2013,
- Duleek/Bellewstown 0–7, 0-7 Seneschalstown, Walterstown, 14/4/2013,
- Moynalvey 0–5, 0-15 Navan O'Mahonys, Skryne, 19/4/2013,

Round 2

- Walterstown 2–5, 0-11 Duleek/Bellewstown, Ashbourne, 21/4/2013,
- Seneschalstown 0-16, 0-11 Moynalvey, Walterstown, 25/4/2013,
- Navan O'Mahonys 1-11, 1-3 Nobber, Castletown, 3/5/2013,

Round 3

- Navan O'Mahonys 1-15, 0-8 Duleek/Bellewstown, Seneschalstown, 30/5/2013,
- Walterstown 1–7, 1-14 Seneschalstown, Dunsany, 1/6/2013,
- Nobber 0–7, 1-11 Moynalvey, Walterstown, 2/6/2013,

Round 4

- Duleek/Bellewstown 3-10, 0-9 Nobber, Castletown, 16/8/2013,
- Seneschalstown 0–5, 0-10 Navan O'Mahonys, Stamullen, 18/8/2013,
- Moynalvey 1-12, 0-8 Walterstown, Ashbourne, 27/8/2013,

Round 5

- Moynalvey 2-13, 1-6 Duleek/Bellewstown, Dunshaughlin, 31/8/2013,
- Nobber 0–8, 5-14 Seneschalstown, Carlanstown, 31/8/2013,
- Navan O'Mahonys 4-21, 1-6 Walterstown, Pairc Tailteann, 31/8/2013.

=== Group B ===
Team	Pld	W	L	D	PF	PA	PD	Pts
Skryne	5	3	1	1	74	65	+9	7
Rathkenny	5	3	1	1	62	57	+5	7
Summerhill	5	3	2	0	69	56	+13	6
St Patricks	5	3	2	0	54	56	-2	6
Donaghmore/Ashbourne	5	2	3	0	80	57	+23	4
Oldcastle	5	0	5	0	37	85	-48	0

Round 1

- St. Patrick's 1-11, 1-8 Donaghmore/Ashbourne, Pairc Tailteann, 13/4/2013,
- Skryne 2-8, 1-10 Summerhill, Bohermeen, 14/4/2013,
- Rathkenny 1-7, 0-4 Oldcastle, Kilmainhamwood, 14/4/2013,

Round 2

- Donaghmore/Ashbourne 3-13, 1-8 Skryne, Ratoath, 20/4/2013,
- Summerhill 0–15, 1-13 Rathkenny, Pairc Tailteann, 21/4/2013,
- Oldcastle 2–3, 1-8 St. Patrick's, Simonstown, 3/5/2013,

Round 3

- Donaghmore/Ashbourne 1–10, 1-12 Rathkenny, Simonstown, 30/5/2013,
- Skryne 0-11, 1-6 St. Patrick's, Ashbourne, 31/5/2013,
- Summerhill 1-11, 0-9 Oldcastle, Athboy, 31/5/2013

Round 4

- Oldcastle 0–6, 2-18 Donaghmore/Ashbourne, Simonstown, 16/8/2013,
- Rathkenny 0–12, 2-6 Skryne, Dunshaughlin, 16/8/2013,
- St. Patrick's 1–4, 1-13 Summerhill, Walterstown, 17/8/2013,

Round 5

- Donaghmore/Ashbourne 0–10, 0-11 Summerhill, Pairc Tailteann, 30/8/2013,
- Skryne 2-20, 0-9 Oldcastle, Simonstown, 30/8/2013,
- St. Patrick's 1-10, 1-6 Rathkenny, Ashbourne, 30/8/2013.

=== Group C ===
Team	Pld	W	L	D	PF	PA	PD	Pts
Na Fianna	5	4	1	0	90	67	+23	8
Wolfe Tones	5	3	2	0	66	71	-5	6
St Peters Dunboyne	5	2	3	0	69	65	+4	4
Blackhall Gaels	5	2	3	0	62	61	+1	4
Simonstown Gaels	5	2	3	0	76	79	-3	4
Dunshaughlin	5	2	3	0	63	83	-20	4

Round 1

- Simonstown Gaels 1–9, 0-17 Dunshaughlin, Pairc Tailteann, 12/4/2013,
- Na Fianna 2-10, 1-11 St. Peter's Dunboyne, Pairc Tailteann, 14/4/2013,
- Wolfe Tones 2-6, 0-10 Blackhall Gaels, Pairc Tailteann, 20/4/2013,

Round 2

- St. Peter's Dunboyne 2-7, 0-11 Simonstown Gaels, Dunderry, 20/4/2013,
- Blackhall Gaels 1-12, 0-12 Na Fianna, Summerhill, 26/4/2013,
- Dunshaughlin 1–11, 1-14 Wolfe Tones, Skryne, 2/5/2013,

Round 3

- Blackhall Gaels 1–5, 0-14 St. Peter's Dunboyne, Summerhill, 30/5/2013,
- Wolfe Tones 2–5, 1-17 Simonstown Gaels, Brew's Hill, 31/5/2013,
- Dunshaughlin 0–9, 3-12 Na Fianna, Trim, 1/6/2013,

Round 4

- Na Fianna 1-10, 0-11 Wolfe Tones, Trim, 17/8/2013,
- Simonstown Gaels 0-15, 0-10 Blackhall Gaels, Bohermeen, 18/8/2013,
- St. Peter's Dunboyne 1–11, 0-15 Dunshaughlin, Dunsany, 18/8/2013,

Round 5

- Dunshaughlin 0–8, 4-7 Blackhall Gaels, Pairc Tailteann, 1/9/2013,
- Wolfe Tones 2-9, 1-11 St. Peter's Dunboyne, Ashbourne, 1/9/2013,
- Simonstown Gaels 1–15, 5-13 Na Fianna, Trim, 1/9/2013.

== Knock-out Stages ==
=== Relegation Play Off ===
The three bottom finishers from each group qualify for the relegation play off and play each other in a round robin basis. The team with the worst record after two matches will be relegated to the 2014 Intermediate Championship.

Team	Pld	W	L	D	PF	PA	PD	Pts
Oldcastle	2	1	0	1	25	24	+1	3
Dunshaughlin	2	1	1	0	25	24	+1	2
Nobber	2	0	1	1	25	27	-2	1

- Game 1: Nobber 1–10, 1-10 Oldcastle, Kilmainham, 14/9/2013,
- Game 2: Nobber 1–9, 1-11 Dunshaughlin, Brews Hill, 21/9/2013,
- Game 3: Dunshaughlin 0–11, 0-12 Oldcastle, Simonstown, 28/9/2013,

=== Finals ===
The winners and runners up of each group qualify for the quarter-finals along with the third-placed finisher of Group A.

Preliminary Quarter-Finals
Summerhill	3-14
St. Peter's Dunboyne	2-11

Quarter-Finals
Navan O'Mahonys	1-8
Summerhill	1-9
Rathkenny	0-14 AET
Seneschalstown	1-10 AET
Skryne	3-10
Wolfe Tones	3-12
Na Fianna	7-10
Moynalvey	2-10

Semi-Finals
Summerhill	0-15
Rathkenny	1-7
Wolfe Tones	1-12
Na Fianna	2-19

Final
Summerhill	1-13
Na Fianna	1-10

Preliminary Quarter-Final:

- Summerhill 3-14, 2-11 St. Peter's Dunboyne, Ashbourne, 8/9/2013,

Quarter-final:

- Skryne 3–10, 3-12 Wolfe Tones, Pairc Tailteann, 13/9/2013,
- Na Fianna 7-10, 2-10 Moynalvey, Pairc Tailteann, 14/9/2013,
- Rathkenny 0-14, 1-10 Seneschalstown, Pairc Tailteann, 15/9/2013, (A.E.T.)
- Navan O'Mahonys 1–8, 1-9 Summerhill, Trim, 15/9/2013,

Semi-final:

- Wolfe Tones 1–12, 2-19 Na Fianna, Pairc Tailteann, 27/9/2013,
- Summerhill 0-15, 1-7 Rathkenny, Pairc Tailteann, 29/9/2013,

Final:

- Na Fianna 1–10, 1-13 Summerhill, Pairc Tailteann, 20/10/2013,
20 October 2013
3:30pm
Final

Summerhill	1-13 - 1-10	Na Fianna
B Ennis (0-4), D Larkin (1-0), A Kenny, S Dalton (0-2 each), S Husband, M Byrne, P Rispin, B Dardis, R Hatton (0-1 each).		Shane Barrett (0-3), D McDonagh (1-0), D Queeney, D Hendrick (0-2 each), M Foley, C Downey, D Barrett (0-1 each).

Pairc Tailteann, Meath
Referee: Patrick Neilis, Kilmainham.

== Leinster Senior Club Football Championship ==
Quarter-final:

- Newtown Blues 1–13, 2-13 Summerhill, Drogheda Park, 10/11/2013,

Semi-final:

- St. Vincent's 1-14, 1-10 Summerhill, Parnell Park, 24/11/2013,
