= Gaeil Colmcille CLG =

Gaeil Colmcille
- Gaeil Colmcille
- Founded: 1964
- County: Meath
- Colours: White, Red and Green
- Grounds: Grangegodden & Pairc Colmcille

Playing kits
Standard colours

Senior Club Championships
	All Ireland	Leinster champions	Meath champions
Football:	-	-	3

Gaeil Colmcille CLG is a Gaelic Athletic Association club located in the town of Kells, County Meath, Ireland.

The club currently plays at senior level in the Meath Senior Football Championship and play their home games at Grangegodden and Pairc Colmcille.

== History ==
The club was founded in 1964 and had almost immediate success, reaching the Meath Senior Football final in 1964 but lost by 2 points to Kilbride GFC 0-08 to 0-06.

In 1966, the club won the Meath Senior Football Championship for the first time beating Kilbride 0-08 to 0-06 after the teams couldn't be separated after two previous games. They won their second title in 1968 beating Walterstown in the final 3-17 to 1-04. They won their third and most recent Senior Football Championship in 1991, when they defeated Walterstown again in the final by 1-12 to 1-06. Terry Ferguson captaining the side that day, with Eugene McGillick picking up the Man of the Match award.

The club has won the Meath Intermediate Hurling Championship four times, most recently in 2008. In October 2013, Gaeil Colmcille won the Meath Intermediate Football Championship beating Clann Na nGael in the final 0-18 to 0-05, paving the way for the club's return to senior ranks in 2014.

The club traditionally wears white, red and green jerseys.

== Honours ==
- Meath Senior Football Championship: 3
  - 1966, 1968, 1991
- Meath Intermediate Football Championship: 2
  - 1986, 2013
- Meath Junior Football Championship: 2
  - 1966, 1992
- Meath Junior B Football Championship: 2
  - 1979, 1974, 2017
- Meath Junior C Football Championship: 1
  - 1990
- Meath Intermediate Hurling Championship: 4
  - 1974, 1988, 1996, 2008
- Meath Junior 2 Hurling Championship: 1
  - 2011
- Meath Feis Cup: 2
  - 2015 2018
- Meath A Football League Div 1: 3
  - 1991, 1994, 2019
- Meath 'A' Football League Div 2: 2
  - 1986, 2015
- Meath A Football League Div 3: 1
  - 2004
- Meath Under 21 Football Championship: 3
  - 1989, 1990, 1996

Preceded by Navan O' Mahony's	Meath Senior Football Champions; 1991	Succeeded by Skryne
