= 2022 Meath Intermediate Football Championship =

Gaelic football competition

96th Meath Intermediate Football Championship
Tournament details
- County: Meath
- Province: Leinster
- Year: 2022
- Trophy: Mattie McDonnell Cup
- Sponsor: Meade Potato
- Date: 7 July 2022 - 15 October 2022
- Teams: 18
- Defending champions: Trim

Winners
- Champions: Dunshaughlin (3rd win)
- Manager: Richie Kealy

Runners-up
- Runners-up: Duleek/Bellewstown
- Manager: Joe Sheridan

Other
- Matches played: 42
- Website: Meath GAA

The 2022 Meath Intermediate Football Championship was the 96th edition of the Meath GAA's premier club Gaelic football tournament for Intermediate graded teams in County Meath, Ireland. The tournament consisted of 18 teams and started with a group stage before progressing to a knock out stage. The winner will represent Meath in the Leinster Intermediate Club Football Championship.

Trim were the 2021 Meath Intermediate Football Champions after they defeated Oldcastle in the final. As a result, after competing at Intermediate level since 2012, they will compete in the 2022 Meath Senior Football Championship.

Dunshaughlin were relegated from the Senior Football Championship in 2021 after competing in the Senior Football Championship since 1998 and winning three Meath Senior Football Championships and one Leinster Senior Club Football Championship in that time. St. Vincent's were promoted to the I.F.C. after beating Dunsany in the 2021 Meath Junior Football Championship final. Syddan, Ballinlough and Moylagh were relegated to the 2022 Meath Junior Football Championship.

The draw for the group stages of the championship took place on 9 May 2022 with the games commencing on 7 July 2022.

On 15 October 2022, Dunshaughlin beat Duleek/Bellewstown by 0-17 to 0-7 to win the Mattie McDonnell Cup for the third time in their history and return to the senior ranks having only been relegated the previous season.

== Championship structure ==
The championship consisted of four groups, two containing four teams and two containing five teams. The top two teams in each group progressed to the knockout stages while the bottom team in each group contested the relegation playoffs.

== Team changes ==
The following teams changed division since the 2021 championship season:

=== From I.F.C. ===
Promoted to 2022 S.F.C.

- Trim - (Intermediate Champions)

Relegated to 2022 Meath Junior Football Championship

- Syddan
- Ballinlough
- Moylagh

=== To I.F.C. ===
Relegated from 2021 S.F.C.

- Dunshaughlin

Promoted from 2021 J.F.C.

- St. Vincent's - (Junior 'A' Champions)

== Participating teams ==
The teams taking part in the 2022 Meath Intermediate Football Championship were:

Club	Location	Management	2021 Championship Position	2022 Championship Position
Ballivor	Ballivor	Sean Corrigan	Preliminary Quarter-Finalist	Non-Qualifier
Bective	Navan	Kevin Dowd	Non Qualifier	Non-Qualifier
Blackhall Gaels	Batterstown and Kilcloon	Ronan Loftus	Quarter-Finalist	Non-Qualifier
Clann na nGael	Athboy and Rath Cairn		Preliminary Quarter-Finalist	Relegated to 2023 JFC
Dunshaughlin	Dunshaughlin	Richie Kealy	Relegated from 2021 SFC	Champions
Drumbaragh Emmets	Drumbaragh, Kells	David Wright	Non Qualifier	Relegation Playoff
Duleek/Bellewstown	Duleek & Bellewstown	Joe Sheridan	Quarter-Finalist	Runners-up
Dunderry	Dunderry		Quarter-Finalist	Semi-Finalist
Kilmainham	Kilmainham, Kells	John Tiernan	Relegation Playoff	Relegated to 2023 JFC
Longwood	Longwood		Non-Qualifier	Non-Qualifier
Meath Hill	Meath Hill	Martin McGovern	Non-Qualifier	Non-Qualifier
Nobber	Nobber	Patrick Bates	Quarter-Finalist	Semi-Finalist
Oldcastle	Oldcastle	Jude McNabb	Finalists	Quarter-Finalist
Rathkenny	Rathkenny & Stackallan	Paul McManus	Semi-Finalist	Quarter-Finalist
St. Michael's	Carlanstown & Kilbeg		Non Qualifier	Non-Qualifier
St. Patrick's	Stamullen	Ronan Kearns & Daithí White	Relegation Playoff	Quarter-Finalist
St. Vincent's	Ardcath	Hugh Durrigan	2021 JFC Champions	Relegated to 2023 JFC
Walterstown	Johnstown	Neil Reynolds	Semi-Finalist	Quarter-Finalist

== Group stage ==
There are four groups, with Groups A & B containing 4 teams each and Groups C & D containing 5 teams each. The top two teams in each group automatically qualify for the quarter-finals.

As in 2021, three teams will be relegated from IFC to JFC in 2022 in order to bring the IFC from 20 teams to 16 teams in 2023. In 2022, the last placed teams in each group (four teams in total) will be randomly drawn into the relegation semi-finals. The relegation final winner stays in IFC - and the other 3 teams are relegated to the JFC.

Tiebreakers: If two or more teams were equal on points on completion of the group matches, the following tie-breaking criteria would be applied:

All Football Championships and Leagues shall be run on a combination of a league and knockout basis under Rule 6.21 T.O. Where teams finish equal with points for qualification or relegation process for concluding stages, the positioning shall be decided as follows;

- (i) Where three teams are involved - the outcome of the meetings of the three teams in their previous games in the competition. If three teams finish level on points for three places and one team has beaten the other two teams that team qualifies in first place and other places are determined by the specified order. If there are two positions and one team has beaten the other two teams that team qualifies and the second place is determined by the specified order. If there is one position and one team has beaten the other two team that team qualifies;
- (ii) Where two teams are involved - the outcome of the meeting of the two teams in the previous game in the competition;
- (iii) Scoring Difference;
- (iv) Highest total scores for;
- (v) A play-off.

=== Group A ===
Team	Pld	W	L	D	PF	PA	PD	Pts
Oldcastle	3	2	1	0	56	38	+18	4
Walterstown	3	2	1	0	53	40	+13	4
St. Michael's	3	2	1	0	44	38	+6	4
St. Vincent's	3	0	3	0	24	61	-37	0

Round 1

- Oldcastle 3-6, 0-17 Walterstown, Kells, 6/8/2022
- St. Michael's 1-10, 0-9 St. Vincent's, Seneschalstown, 7/8/2022

Round 2

- St. Vincent's 1-5, 3-15 Oldcastle, Trim, 21/8/2022
- Walterstown 0-12, 2-12 St. Michael's, Kells, 21/8/2022

Round 3

- Walterstown 4-12, 0-7 St. Vincent's, Ratoath, 4/9/2022
- St. Michael's v Oldcastle, Kells, 4/9/2022

=== Group B ===
Team	Pld	W	L	D	PF	PA	PD	Pts
Nobber	3	2	1	0	51	58	-7	4
Dunderry	3	2	1	0	46	34	+12	4
Longwood	3	1	2	0	48	49	-1	2
Drumbaragh Emmets	3	1	2	0	53	57	-4	2

Round 1

- Drumbaragh 1-14, 5-11 Longwood, Kildalkey, 6/8/2022
- Nobber 2-12, 1-13 Dunderry, Bohermeen, 7/8/2022

Round 2

- Longwood 0-14, 3-9 Nobber, Bective, 20/8/2022
- Dunderry 1-13, 0-8 Drumbaragh, Carnaross, 21/8/2022

Round 3

- Dunderry 0-14, 0-8 Longwood, Rathmolyon, 3/9/2022
- Drumbaragh 4-16, 2-9 Nobber, Carlanstown, 3/9/2022

=== Group C ===
Team	Pld	W	L	D	PF	PA	PD	Pts
Dunshaughlin	4	4	0	0	87	31	+56	8
St. Patrick's	4	3	1	0	65	56	+9	6
Bective	4	2	2	0	51	66	-15	4
Blackhall Gaels	4	1	3	0	47	66	-19	2
Kilmainham	4	0	4	0	48	79	-31	0

Round 1

- St. Patrick's 0-11, 0-8 Blackhall Gaels, Dunsany, 8/7/2022
- Kilmainham 0-7, 1-11 Bective, Páirc Tailteann, 10/7/2022

Round 2

- Bective 0-8, 3-10 St. Patrick's, Slane, 22/7/2022
- Dunshaughlin 1-17, 1-7 Kilmainham, Walterstown, 23/7/2022

Round 3

- St. Patrick's 1-9, 2-18 Dunshaughlin, Ashbourne, 5/7/2022
- Blackhall Gaels 2-10, 4-9 Bective, Dunsany, 7/8/2022

Round 4

- Dunshaughlin 1-16, 0-1 Blackhall Gaels, Moynalvey, 20/8/2022
- Kilmainham 0-16, 3-14 St. Patrick's, Walterstown, 21/8/2022

Round 5

- Blackhall Gaels 4-10, 1-12 Kilmainham, Walterstown, 3/9/2022
- Bective 1-5, 4-12 Dunshaughlin, Dunsany, 3/9/2022

=== Group D ===
Team	Pld	W	L	D	PF	PA	PD	Pts
Duleek/Bellewstown	4	3	1	0	88	66	+22	6
Rathkenny	4	3	1	0	77	53	+24	6
Meath Hill	4	2	2	0	58	65	-7	4
Ballivor	4	1	3	0	65	72	-7	2
Clann na nGael	4	1	3	0	58	90	-32	2

Round 1

- Rathkenny 2-14, 1-7 Ballivor, Dunderry, 7/7/2022
- Clann na nGael 1-10, 2-23 Duleek/Bellewstown, Seneschalstown, 7/7/2022

Round 2

- Ballivor 3-14, 1-9 Clann na nGael, Boardsmill, 22/7/2022
- Meath Hill 2-4, 1-12 Rathkenny, Páirc Tailteann, 23/7/2022

Round 3

- Duleek/Bellewstown 3-15, 2-11 Ballivor, Walterstown, 5/8/2022
- Clann na nGael 4-9, 0-15 Meath Hill, Kilmainham, 7/8/2022

Round 4

- Meath Hill 2-11, 1-11 Duleek/Bellewstown, Páirc Tailteann, 21/8/2022
- Rathkenny 2-17, 2-6 Clann na nGael, Páirc Tailteann, 21/8/2022

Round 5

- Duleek/Bellewstown 4-9, 2-13 Rathkenny, Slane, 4/9/2022
- Ballivor 1-12, 2-10 Meath Hill, Páirc Tailteann, 4/9/2022

== Knock-out stage ==
The top two teams from each group qualify for the quarter-finals. Quarter-final pairings were drawn with one group winner and one 2nd placed team in each pair with no repeat pairings from group stages. Semi-final pairings were determined by an open draw. The draw for the quarter-finals and Semi-finals took place on 5 September 2022.

Quarter-Finals
Nobber	3-8
Walterstown	0-16
Dunshaughlin	1-12
Rathkenny	1-9
Duleek/Bellewstown	1-11 (Pens)
St. Patrick's	2-8
Oldcastle	1-9
Dunderry	2-8

Semi-Finals
Nobber	0-10
Dunshaughlin	2-19
Duleek/Bellewstown	4-17
Dunderry	0-7

Final
Dunshaughlin	0-17
Duleek/Bellewstown	0-7

=== Quarter-finals ===
17 September 2022 Quarter-final 1	Nobber	3-8 (17) – (16) 0-16	Walterstown	Kells
17:00 IST (UTC+1)		(HT: 0-2 - 0-11)
		Report

18 September 2022 Quarter-final 2	Oldcastle	1-9 (12) – (14) 2-8	Dunderry	Kilmainham
13:00 IST (UTC+1)		(HT: 1-2 - 1-4)

16 September 2022 Quarter-final 3	Duleek/Bellewstown	1-11 (14) – (14) 2-8 (a.e.t.) (6-5 pen)	St. Patrick's	Ashbourne
20:00 IST (UTC+1)		(HT: 1-4 - 0-3)
		Report
		Penalty shootout

17 September 2022 Quarter-final 4	Dunshaughlin	1-12 (15) – (12) 1-9	Rathkenny	Navan
17:00 IST (UTC+1)		(HT: 0-5 - 1-3)		Venue: Páirc Tailteann

=== Semi-finals ===
1 October 2022 Semi-final 1	Dunshaughlin	2-19 (25) – (10) 0-10	Nobber	Navan
14:30 IST (UTC+1)		(HT: 1-8 - 0-6)		Venue: Páirc Tailteann
		Report

1 October 2022 Semi-final 2	Duleek/Bellewstown	4-17 (29) – (7) 0-7	Dunderry	Navan
16:30 IST (UTC+1)				Venue: Páirc Tailteann
		Report

=== Final ===
15 October 2022 Final	Dunshaughlin	0-17 (17) – (7) 0-7	Duleek/Bellewstown	Navan
16:00 IST (UTC+1)		(HT: 0-10 - 0-3)		Venue: Páirc Tailteann
		Report

== Relegation play-off ==
Three teams will be relegated from the 2022 IFC. The last placed team in each group will contest the relegation playoffs. Each team was randomly drawn into relegation semi-finals. The winners of the semi-finals will contest the relegation final. The winner of the relegation final will preserve their intermediate status while the losers of the semi-finals and final will be relegated to the 2023 JFC. The draw for the Relegation Semi-finals took place on 5 September 2022.

=== Relegation semi-finals ===
17 September 2022 Relegation Semi-final 1	Clann na nGael	1-24 (27) – (23) 4-11	Kilmainham	Bohermeen
17:00 IST (UTC+1)				Venue: Seán Newman Park

18 September 2022 Relegation Semi-final 2	Drumbaragh	4-10 (22) – (13) 0-13	St. Vincent's	Bective
12:00 IST (UTC+1)		(HT: 0-7 - 0-5)

=== Relegation final ===
2 October 2022 Relegation Final	Clann na nGael	0-15 (15) – (16) 1-13	Drumbaragh
12:00 IST (UTC+1)
