= 2023 Meath Senior Football Championship =

Football league season

131st Meath Senior Football Championship
Tournament details
- County: Meath
- Province: Leinster
- Year: 2023
- Trophy: Keegan Cup
- Sponsor: Fairyhouse Steel
- Date: 27 July - 8 October
- Teams: 16
- Defending champions: Ratoath

Other
- Matches played: 38
- Website: Meath GAA

The 2023 Meath Senior Football Championship was the 131st edition of the Meath GAA's premier club Gaelic football tournament for senior clubs in County Meath, with 16 teams competing. The winner represented Meath in the Leinster Senior Club Football Championship. The championship started with a group stage and then progressed to a knock out stage.

Ratoath were the defending champions after defeating Summerhill in the 2022 final.

Having only been relegated to Intermediate in 2021, Dunshaughlin returned to the Senior Football Championship by beating Duleek/Bellewstown in the 2022 Meath Intermediate Football Championship final.

The draw for the group stages of the championship took place on 24 April 2023 with the games due to commence on 27 July 2023.

On 8 October 2023, in a repeat of the 2022 final, Summerhill faced off against Ratoath. Summerhill reversed the result of the 2022 final and won their 8th Keegan Cup and their first since 2013, having lost four finals since their last triumph. Eoghan Frayne was awarded Man of the Match, scoring 6 points.

Moynalvey were relegated to the Meath Intermediate Football Championship after losing to Skryne in the relegation playoff final, ending their 12 year stint at senior level.

== Championship structure ==
The 2023 Meath S.F.C. consisted of 16 teams drawn into four groups each containing four teams. The top two teams progressed to the quarter-finals, while the bottom two in each group contested the Relegation Quarter-Finals. The losers of each Relegation Quarter-Final then contested the Relegation Semi-Finals, the losers of which would play-off for the right to retain their senior status into 2024.

== Team changes ==
The following teams changed division since the 2022 championship season.

=== To S.F.C. ===
Promoted from 2022 I.F.C.

- Dunshaughlin - (Intermediate Champions)

=== From S.F.C. ===
Relegated to 2023 I.F.C.

- Navan O'Mahonys

== Participating teams ==
The teams taking part in the 2023 Meath Senior Football Championship were:

Club	Location	Management	Pre C'ship Odds	2022 Championship Position	2023 Championship Position
Ballinabrackey	Ballinabrackey	Trevor Bannon	50/1	Relegation Semi-Finalist	Relegation Quarter-Finalist
Curraha	Curraha	Ruairi Murphy	100/1	Relegation Quarter-Finalist	Relegation Quarter-Finalist
Donaghmore/Ashbourne	Ashbourne	Padraig Durkan & Shane Treanor	14/1	Relegation Quarter-Finalist	Semi-Finalist
Dunshaughlin	Dunshaughlin & Drumree	Richie Kealy	25/1	I.F.C. Champions	Quarter-Finalist
Gaeil Colmcille	Kells	Eoin Carroll & Brendan Murphy	10/1	Quarter-Finalist	Relegation Quarter-Finalist
Moynalvey	Moynalvey & Kiltale	Caoimhin King	25/1	Quarter-Finalist	Relegated
Na Fianna	Enfield & Baconstown	Cormac Davey	14/1	Semi-Finalist	Relegation Semi-Finalist
Ratoath	Ratoath	Kevin Reilly	11/10	Champions	Runners Up
Seneschalstown	Kentstown & Yellow Furze	Ciaran Marks	80/1	Relegation Finalist	Relegation Quarter-Finalist
Simonstown Gaels	Navan	Gordon Ward	16/1	Relegation Quarter-Finalist	Quarter-Finalist
Skryne	Skryne & Tara	Davy Byrne	20/1	Quarter-Finalist	Relegation Quarter Finalist
St. Colmcille's	Bettystown, Donacarney, Laytown & Mornington	Jody Devine	33/1	Relegation Semi-Finalist	Quarter-Finalist
St. Peter's Dunboyne	Dunboyne	Ger Robinson	9/1	Relegation Quarter-Finalist	Relegation Semi-Finalist
Summerhill	Summerhill	Conor Gillespie	4/1	Runners-up	Champions
Trim	Trim	Ciaran Giblin	25/1	Quarter-Finalist	Quarter-Finalist
Wolfe Tones	Kilberry, Gibbstown, Oristown & Wilkinstown	Paddy Martin	10/1	Semi-Finalist	Semi-Finalist

== Group stage ==
There were four groups of four teams called Group A, B, C and D. The 1st and 2nd placed teams in each group qualified for the quarter-finals. The 3rd and 4th placed team in each group proceeded to the Relegation Play-Off to determine which team would be relegated.

The draw for the group stages of the championship was made on 24 April 2023.

=== Group A ===
Team	Pld	W	L	D	PF	PA	PD	Pts
Dunshaughlin	3	3	0	0	42	36	+6	6
Donaghmore/Ashbourne	3	1	2	0	38	39	-1	2
Na Fianna	3	1	2	0	33	34	-1	2
Curraha	3	1	2	0	35	39	-4	2

Round 1

- Donaghmore/Ashbourne 1-10, 0-14 Dunshaughlin, Ratoath, 29/7/2023
- Na Fianna 1-9, 0-8 Curraha, Kilcloon, 30/7/2023

Round 2

- Dunshaughlin 2-10, 0-12 Na Fianna, Páirc Tailteann, 11/8/2023
- Curraha 4-4, 1-12 Donaghmore/Ashbourne, Ratoath, 12/8/2023

Round 3

- Curraha 1-8, 0-12 Dunshaughlin, Ardcath, 25/8/2023
- Donaghmore/Ashbourne 1-7, 0-9 Na Fianna, Páirc Tailteann, 25/8/2023

=== Group B ===
Team	Pld	W	L	D	PF	PA	PD	Pts
Simonstown Gaels	3	2	0	1	42	38	+4	5
Trim	3	2	1	0	41	38	+3	4
St. Peter's Dunboyne	3	1	2	0	43	39	+4	2
Seneschalstown	3	0	2	1	47	58	-11	1

Round 1

- Seneschalstown 0-12, 2-14 St. Peters Dunboyne, Dunsany, 28/7/2023
- Simonstown Gaels 1-7, 1-5 Trim, Páirc Tailteann, 29/7/2023

Round 2

- Seneschalstown 2-10, 2-13 Trim, Bective, 12/8/2023
- St. Peters Dunboyne 0-11, 1-10 Simonstown Gaels, Walterstown, 13/8/2023

Round 3

- Simonstown Gaels 2-13, 2-13 Seneschalstown, Páirc Tailteann, 26/8/2023
- St. Peters Dunboyne 0-12, 1-11 Trim, Summerhill, 26/8/2023

=== Group C ===
Team	Pld	W	L	D	PF	PA	PD	Pts
St. Colmcille's	3	2	0	1	38	29	+9	5
Ratoath	3	2	1	0	62	36	+26	4
Moynalvey	3	1	1	1	36	39	-3	3
Skryne	3	0	3	0	33	65	-32	0

Round 1

- Ratoath 1-14, 0-8 Moynalvey, Skryne, 27/7/2023
- St. Colmcilles 0-12, 0-9 Skryne, Ashbourne, 28/7/2023

Round 2

- Moynalvey 0-10, 0-10 St. Colmcilles, Skryne, 11/8/2023
- Skryne 1-9, 7-14 Ratoath, Ashbourne, 13/8/2023

Round 3

- Ratoath 0-10, 2-10 St. Colmcilles, Páirc Tailteann, 27/8/2023
- Skryne 0-12, 4-6 Moynalvey, Dunshaughlin, 27/8/2023

=== Group D ===
Team	Pld	W	L	D	PF	PA	PD	Pts
Summerhill	3	3	0	0	54	26	+28	6
Wolfe Tones	3	2	1	0	46	37	+9	4
Ballinabrackey	3	1	2	0	37	46	-9	0
Gaeil Colmcille	3	0	3	0	29	57	-28	0

Round 1

- Wolfe Tones 2-15, 0-7 Gaeil Colmcille, Páirc Tailteann, 28/7/2023
- Ballinabrackey 0-7, 2-12 Summerhill, Clonard, 29/7/2023

Round 2

- Summerhill 2-13, 0-11 Wolfe Tones, Páirc Tailteann, 13/8/2023
- Gaeil Colmcille 0-14, 2-13 Ballinabrackey, Trim, 13/8/2023

Round 3

- Summerhill 1-14, 0-8 Gaeil Colmcille, Páirc Tailteann, 27/8/2023
- Wolfe Tones 2-8, 1-8 Ballinabrackey, Trim, 27/8/2023

== Knock-out stage ==
The 1st and 2nd placed teams in each group qualified for the quarter-finals. Quarter Final pairings were drawn with one group winner and one 2nd placed team in each pair with no repeat pairings from group stages. Semi Final pairings were determined by an open draw. The draw for the quarter-finals and Semi-Finals took place on 28th August 2023.

Quarter-Finals
St. Colmcilles	0-13
Donaghmore/Ashbourne	1-11
Summerhill	1-14
Trim	2-4
Simonstown Gaels	1-5
Wolfe Tones	2-11
Dunshaughlin	1-8
Ratoath	1-9

Semi-Finals
Donaghmore/Ashbourne	0-8
Summerhill	0-10
Wolfe Tones	0-6
Ratoath	0-7

Final
Summerhill	0-22 (a.e.t.)
Ratoath	1-13 (a.e.t.)

=== Quarter-finals ===
8 September 2023 Quarter-Final 1	St. Colmcilles	0-13 (13) – (14) 1-11	Donaghmore/Ashbourne	Skryne
20:00 IST (UTC+1)
		Report		Referee: David Coldrick

9 September 2023 Quarter-Final 2	Simonstown Gaels	1-5 (8) – (17) 2-11	Wolfe Tones	Navan
17:15 IST (UTC+1)				Venue: Páirc Tailteann
		Report

10 September 2023 Quarter-Final 3	Summerhill	1-14 (17) – (10) 2-4	Trim	Navan
16:00 IST (UTC+1)				Venue: Páirc Tailteann
		Report

10 September 2023 Quarter-Final 4	Dunshaughlin	1-8 (11) – (12) 1-9	Ratoath	Ashbourne
19:30 IST (UTC+1)

=== Semi-finals ===
23 September 2023 Semi-Final 1	Donaghmore/Ashbourne	0-8 (8) – (10) 0-10	Summerhill	Navan
17:00 IST (UTC+1)				Venue: Páirc Tailteann
		Report

24 September 2023 Semi-Final 2	Wolfe Tones	0-6 (6) – (7) 0-7	Ratoath	Navan
16:30 IST (UTC+1)				Venue: Páirc Tailteann
		Report

=== Final ===
8 October 2023 Final	Summerhill	0-22 (22) – (16) 1-13 (a.e.t.)	Ratoath	Navan
14:15 IST (UTC+1)		(HT: 0-10 - 1-6) (FT: 0-15 - 1-12)		Venue: Páirc Tailteann
	Pts: Eoghan Frayne 0-6 (3f), Barry Dardis 0-5 (2m, 1f), David Larkin 0-2, Conor Frayne 0-2, Conor Lyons 0-2, Diarmuid McCabe 0-1, Adam McDonnell 0-1, John Lavelle 0-1, Davy Dalton 0-1, Padraig Jennings 0-1	Report	Pts: Bryan McMahon 1-1, Daithi McGowan 0-4 (3f), Cian O'Brien 0-2, Jack Flynn 0-2, Joey Wallace 0-1, Cian Rogers 0-1, Eamon Wallace 0-1, Ciaran O Fearraigh 0-1	Referee: David Coldrick

== Relegation play-off ==
The relegation play-off consisted of the 3rd and 4th-placed finishers in each group. The winners of each playoff round retained their senior status while the outright loser was relegated to the Intermediate championship for 2024. The draw for the relegation playoffs took place on 28th August 2023.

=== Relegation quarter-finals ===
9 September 2023 Relegation Quarter-Final 1	Na Fianna	0-10 (10) – (18) 3-9	Seneschalstown	Batterstown
19:30 IST (UTC+1)
		Report		Referee: Patrick Coyle

10 September 2023 Relegation Quarter-Final 2	Moynalvey	2-6 (12) – (13) 1-10	Curraha	Dunshaughlin
12:00 IST (UTC+1)
				Referee: Keith Sheerin

9 September 2023 Relegation Quarter-Final 3	Ballinabrackey	0-16 (16) – (15) 1-12	Skryne	Summerhill
17:00 IST (UTC+1)
				Referee: Andrew Smith

10 September 2023 Relegation Quarter-Final 4	St. Peter's Dunboyne	0-18 (18) – (19) 2-13 (a.e.t.)	Gaeil Colmcille	Walterstown
12:00 IST (UTC+1)
		Report		Referee: Kieran Olwell

=== Relegation semi-finals ===
24 September 2023 Relegation Semi-Final 1	Na Fianna	1-13 (16) – (8) 0-8	Skryne	Summerhill
11:30 IST (UTC+1)

22 September 2023 Relegation Semi-Final 2	Moynalvey	0-10 (10) – (27) 4-15	St. Peter's Dunboyne	Batterstown
20:00 IST (UTC+1)
		Report

=== Relegation final ===
8 October 2023 Relegation Final	Skryne	1-12 (15) – (11) 0-11	Moynalvey
11:15 IST (UTC+1)
		Report
