= 2023 Meath Intermediate Football Championship =

Gaelic Football Intermediate Championship

97th Meath Intermediate Football Championship
Tournament details
- County: Meath
- Province: Leinster
- Year: 2023
- Trophy: Mattie McDonnell Cup
- Sponsor: Meade Potato
- Date: 28 July 2023 - 7 October 2023
- Teams: 16
- Defending champions: Dunshaughlin

Winners
- Champions: Rathkenny (3rd win)
- Manager: Donal Curtis
- Captain: Donal Keogan

Runners-up
- Runners-up: Duleek/Bellewstown
- Manager: Joe Sheridan

Promotion/Relegation
- Promoted team(s): Rathkenny
- Relegated team(s): Dunderry

Other
- Matches played: 38
- Website: Meath GAA

The 2023 Meath Intermediate Football Championship was the 97th edition of the Meath GAA's premier club Gaelic football tournament for Intermediate graded teams in County Meath, Ireland. The tournament consisted of 16 teams and started with a group stage before progressing to a knock out stage. Rathkenny won and represented Meath in the Leinster Intermediate Club Football Championship.

Dunshaughlin were the 2022 Meath Intermediate Football Champions after they defeated Duleek/Bellewstown by 0-17 to 0-07 in the final.

Navan O'Mahonys were relegated from the Senior Football Championship in 2022 after playing in the Senior Football Championship since 2004 and winning four Meath Senior Football Championships within that time. Castletown were promoted to the I.F.C. after defeating Dunsany 1-12 to 0-11 in the Meath Junior Football Championship. Clann na nGael, Kilmainham and St. Vincent's were relegated to the 2023 Meath Junior Football Championship.

The draws for the group stages of the championship took place on 24 April 2023 with the games commencing on 28 July 2023.

On 7 October 2023, Rathkenny claimed their third I.F.C title and secured their return to the senior ranks for the first time since 2019 when defeating Duleek/Bellewstown 1-18 to 2-14 in the final.

Dunderry were relegated to the Meath Junior Football Championship after losing to Longwood in the relegation play-off final.

== Championship structure ==
The 2023 Meath I.F.C. consisted of 16 teams drawn into four groups each containing four teams. The top two teams progressed to the quarter-finals, while the bottom two in each group contested the Relegation Quarter-Finals. The losers of each Relegation Quarter-Final then contested the Relegation Semi-Finals, the losers of which would play-off for the right to retain their intermediate status into 2025.

== Team changes ==
The following teams have changed division since the 2022 championship season.

=== From I.F.C. ===
Promoted to 2023 S.F.C.

- Dunshaughlin - (Intermediate Champions)

Relegated to 2023 Meath Junior Football Championship

- Clann na nGael
- Kilmainham
- St. Vincent's

=== To I.F.C. ===
Relegated from 2022 S.F.C.

- Navan O'Mahonys

Promoted from 2022 J.F.C.

- Castletown - (Junior 'A' Champions)

== Participating teams ==
The teams taking part in the 2023 Meath Intermediate Football Championship were:

Club	Location	Management	2022 Championship Position	2023 Championship Position
Ballivor	Ballivor		Non-Qualifier	Quarter-Finalist
Bective	Navan	David Nolan	Non-Qualifier	Relegation Semi-Finalist
Blackhall Gaels	Batterstown & Kilcloon		Non-Qualifier	Relegation Quarter-Finalist
Castletown	Castletown-Kilpatrick	Aidan Young	2022 JFC Champions	Quarter-Finalist
Drumbaragh Emmets	Drumbaragh, Kells	Davy Cahill	Relegation Playoff	Relegation Quarter-Finalist
Duleek/Bellewstown	Duleek & Bellewstown	Joe Sheridan	Runners-Up	Runners-Up
Dunderry	Dunderry	Michael Clarke	Semi-Finalist	Relegated to 2024 JFC
Longwood	Longwood	Noel Kerrigan	Non-Qualifier	Relegation Finalist
Meath Hill	Meath Hill	Shane McCoy	Non-Qualifier	Quarter-Finalist
Navan O'Mahonys	Navan	Damien Moran & Rory Maguire	Relegated from 2022 SFC	Semi-Finalist
Nobber	Nobber	Paddy Bates	Semi-Finalist	Relegation Semi-Finalist
Oldcastle	Oldcastle	Jude McNabb	Quarter-Finalist	Relegation Quarter-Finalist
Rathkenny	Rathkenny	Donal Curtis	Quarter-Finalist	Champions
St. Michael's	Carlanstown & Kilbeg	Mick O'Rourke	Non-Qualifier	Relegation Quarter-Finalist
St. Patrick's	Stamullen	Ronan Kearns & Daithi Whyte	Quarter-Finalist	Semi-Finalist
Walterstown	Johnstown	Niall Reynolds	Quarter-Finalist	Quarter-Finalist

== Group stage ==
There were four groups of four teams called Group A, B, C and D. The 1st and 2nd placed teams in each group qualified for the quarter-finals. The 3rd and 4th placed team in each group proceeded to the Relegation Play-Off to determine which team would be relegated.

The draws for the group stage of the championship were made on 24 April 2023

=== Group A ===
Advance to knockout stage Advance to relegation play-off

Team	Matches				Score			Pts
Team	Pld	W	D	L	For	Against	Diff	Pts
Navan O'Mahonys	3	2	1	0	52	43	+9	5
Rathkenny	3	1	1	1	51	39	+12	3
Drumbaragh Emmets	3	1	0	2	42	61	-19	2
Oldcastle	3	0	2	1	39	41	-2	2

==== Round 1 ====
29 July 2023 Round 1	Oldcastle	1-11 (14) – (14) 2-8	Navan O'Mahonys	Ballinlough
18:30		(HT: 0-5 - 1-8)
		Report		Referee: Patrick Clarke

30 July 2023 Round 1	Rathkenny	4-13 (25) – (7) 1-4	Drumbaragah Emmets	Nobber
12:00
				Referee: Martin Dawson

==== Round 2 ====
11 August 2023 Round 2	Drumbaragh Emmets	1-11 (14) – (12) 0-12	Oldcastle	Grangegodden
19:30
				Referee: Joseph Curran

13 August 2023 Round 2	Navan O'Mahonys	2-08 (14) – (13) 0-13	Rathkenny	Navan
14:00		(HT: 2-4 - 0-8)		Venue: Pairc Tailteann
		Report		Referee: Robert Purfield

==== Round 3 ====
25 August 2023 Round 3	Navan O'Mahonys	2-18 (24) – (16) 3-7	Drumbaragh Emmets	Bohermeen
19:15		(HT: 1-10 - 1-2)
		Report		Referee: Patrick Clarke

25 August 2023 Round 3	Rathkenny	0-13 (13) – (13) 2-7	Oldcastle	Carlanstown
19:15
				Referee: Robbie Barrett

=== Group B ===
Advance to knockout stage Advance to relegation play-off

Team	Matches				Score			Pts
Team	Pld	W	D	L	For	Against	Diff	Pts
Duleek/Bellewstown	3	3	0	0	46	33	+13	6
Castletown	3	2	0	1	46	45	+1	4
St. Michael's	3	1	0	2	36	42	-6	2
Blackhall Gaels	3	0	0	3	36	44	-8	0

==== Round 1 ====
29 July 2023 Round 1	Blackhall Gaels	3-7 (16) – (19) 1-16	Castletown	Bective
18:30		(HT: 1-7 - 0-10)
		Report		Referee: Robbie Barrett

29 July 2023 Round 1	St. Michael's	1-10 (13) – (15) 0-15	Duleek/Bellewstown	Rathkenny
18:30		(HT: 0-5 - 0-10)
		Report		Referee: Robert Purfield

==== Round 2 ====
12 August 2023 Round 2	Duleek/Bellewstown	0-12 (12) – (9) 1-6	Blackhall Gaels	Kilbride
18:30		(HT: 0-7 - 0-2)
		Report		Referee: Peter O'Halloran

12 August 2023 Round 2	Castletown	1-13 (16) – (10) 0-10	St. Michael's	Kilmainhamwood
18:30		(HT: 1-6 - 0-3)
		Report		Referee: Liam Reddy

==== Round 3 ====
26 August 2023 Round 3	Castletown	1-8 (11) – (19) 1-16	Duleek/Bellewstown	Stamullen
18:30		(HT: 1-5 - 1-3)
		Report		Referee: Owen Ganly

26 August 2023 Round 3	St. Michael's	1-10 (13) – (11) 1-8	Blackhall Gaels	Walterstown
18:30		(HT: 0-8 - 0-3)
		Report		Referee: Andrew Lenehan

=== Group C ===
Advance to knockout stage Advance to relegation play-off

Team	Matches				Score			Pts
Team	Pld	W	D	L	For	Against	Diff	Pts
Walterstown	3	3	0	0	61	42	+19	6
Ballivor	3	2	0	1	65	35	+30	4
Nobber	3	1	0	2	35	61	-26	2
Longwood	3	0	0	3	45	68	-23	0

==== Round 1 ====
29 July 2023 Round 1	Walterstown	2-17 (23) – (19) 3-10	Longwood	Trim
18:00		(HT: 1-6 - 0-1)
		Report		Referee: Owen Ganly

29 July 2023 Round 1	Nobber	0-9 (9) – (23) 4-11	Ballivor	Bohermeen
18:30		(HT: 0-4 - 2-5)
		Report		Referee: Peter Skelly

==== Round 2 ====
11 August 2023 Round 2	Longwood	1-13 (16) – (17) 2-11	Nobber	Bohermeen
19:30		(HT: 0-9 - 0-8)
		Report		Referee: Eamon Barry

13 August 2023 Round 2	Ballivor	1-11 (14) – (16) 1-13	Walterstown	Athboy
14:00		(HT: 0-9 - 1-5)
		Report		Referee: Patrick Clarke

==== Round 3 ====
27 August 2023 Round 3	Ballivor	4-16 (28) – (10) 2-4	Longwood	Clonard
12:00		(HT: 2-8 - 1-3)
		Report		Referee: Bernard Heaney

27 August 2023 Round 3	Walterstown	1-19 (22) – (9) 1-6	Nobber	Slane
12:00		(HT: 0-9 - 0-4)
		Report		Referee: Patrick Coyle

=== Group D ===
Advance to knockout stage Advance to relegation play-off

Team	Matches				Score			Pts
Team	Pld	W	D	L	For	Against	Diff	Pts
St. Patrick's	3	3	0	0	47	34	+13	6
Meath Hill	3	2	0	1	51	30	+21	4
Bective	3	1	0	2	43	49	-6	2
Dunderry	3	0	0	3	26	54	-28	0

==== Round 1 ====
28 July 2023 Round 1	Bective	2-7 (13) – (15) 2-9	St. Patrick's	Duleek
19:30		(HT: 0-4 - 0-2)
		Report		Referee: Liam Reddy

30 July 2023 Round 1	Meath Hill	1-13 (16) – (6) 0-6	Dunderry	Castletown
19:00
		Report		Referee: Stephan Cregan

==== Round 2 ====
11 August 2023 Round 2	St. Patrick's	1-11 (14) – (11) 1-8	Meath Hill	Castletown
19:30
				Referee: Robbie Barrett

13 August 2023 Round 2	Dunderry	1-7 (10) – (20) 2-14	Bective	Trim
16:00		(HT: 1-3 - 1-9)
		Report		Referee: Martin Dawson

==== Round 3 ====
27 August 2023 Round 3	Meath Hill	3-15 (24) – (10) 1-7	Bective	Drumconrath
14:00
				Referee: Martin Dawson

27 August 2023 Round 3	St. Patrick's	2-12 (18) – (10) 2-4	Dunderry	Duleek
14:00
				Referee: Liam Reddy

== Knock-out stage ==
The 1st and 2nd placed teams in each group qualified for the quarter-finals. Quarter Final pairings were drawn with one group winner and one 2nd placed team in each pair with no repeat pairings from group stages. Semi Final pairings were determined by an open draw. The draw for the Quarter-finals and Semi-Finals took place on the 28 August 2023.

=== Bracket ===
Quarter-Finals
Walterstown	1-10
Rathkenny	1-17
Navan O'Mahonys	2-10
Ballivor	1-09
Castletown	0-13
St. Patrick's	2-12
Duleek/Bellewstown	0-11
Meath Hill	0-10

Semi-Finals
Rathkenny	1-12
Navan O'Mahonys	0-06
St. Patrick's	1-09
Duleek/Bellewstown	1-17

Final
Rathkenny (AET)	1-18
Duleek/Bellewstown	2-14

=== Quarter-finals ===
9 September 2023 Quarter-Final 1	Walterstown	1-10 (13) – (20) 1-17	Rathkenny	Navan
15:15		(HT: 0-5 - 1-9)		Venue: Pairc Tailteann
		Report		Referee: Robert Purfield

10 September 2023 Quarter-Final 2	St. Patricks	2-12 (18) – (13) 0-13	Castletown	Seneschalstown
12:00		(HT: 1-6 - 0-7)
				Referee: Joseph Curran

10 September 2023 Quarter-Final 3	Duleek/Bellewstown	0-11 (11) – (10) 0-10	Meath Hill	Navan
14:00		(HT: 0-5 - 0-6)		Venue: Pairc Tailteann
		Report		Referee: Padraic Coyle

10 September 2023 Quarter-Final 4	Navan O'Mahonys	2-10 (16) – (12) 1-9	Ballivor	Dunsany
17:00		(HT: 0-6 - 0-3)
		Report		Referee: Liam Reddy

=== Semi-finals ===
23 September 2023 Semi-Final 1	St. Patricks	1-9 (12) – (20) 1-17	Duleek/Bellewstown	Navan
15:00		(HT: 1-6 - 0-8)		Venue: Pairc Tailteann
		Report		Referee: Keith Sheerin

24 September 2023 Semi-Final 2	Navan O'Mahonys	0-6 (6) – (15) 1-12	Rathkenny	Navan
12:30		(HT: 0-1 - 1-7)		Venue: Pairc Tailteann
		Report		Referee: David Gough

=== Final ===
7 October 2023 Final	Rathkenny	1-18 (21) – (20) 2-14 (a.e.t.)	Duleek/Bellewstown	Navan
		(HT: 0-7 - 2-6) (FT: 1-14 - 2-11)		Venue: Pairc Tailteann
		Report		Referee: Andrew Smith

== Relegation play-offs ==
The relegation play-off consisted of the 3rd and 4th-placed finishers in each group. The winners of each playoff round retained their intermediate status while the outright loser was relegated to the Junior championship for 2024. The draw for the Relegation Quarter-finals and Semi-Finals took place on 28 August 2023.

=== Bracket ===
Quarter-Finals
Bective	1-05
Oldcastle	0-11
Drumbaragh Emmets	0-10
Longwood	1-06
Dunderry	0-08
St. Michael's	2-10
Blackhall Gaels (AET)	2-09
Nobber	0-14

Semi-Finals
Bective	3-13
Longwood	1-14
Dunderry	1-09
Nobber	1-15

Final
Longwood (AET)	2-13
Dunderry	1-15

=== Relegation quarter-finals ===
7 September 2023 Relegation Quarter-Final 1	Drumbaragh Emmets	0-10 (10) – (9) 1-6	Longwood	Carnaross
20:00		(HT: 0-7 - 1-2)
		Report		Referee: Robbie Barrett

7 September 2023 Relegation Quarter-Final 2	Nobber	0-14 (14) – (15) 2-9 (a.e.t.)	Blackhall Gaels	Navan
20:00		(HT: 0-8 - 1-6) (FT: 0-11 - 1-8)
		Report		Referee: Owen Ganly

9 September 2023 Relegation Quarter-Final 3	St. Michaels	2-10 (16) – (8) 0-8	Dunderry	Moynalty
20:00		(HT: 1-6 - 0-3)
		Report		Referee: Brendan O'Brien

10 September 2023 Relegation Quarter-Final 4	Bective	1-5 (8) – (11) 0-11	Oldcastle	Drumbaragh
12:00		(HT: 0-2 - 0-5)
				Referee: Bernard Heaney

=== Relegation semi-finals ===
22 September 2023 Relegation Semi-Final 1	Dunderry	1-9 (12) – (18) 1-15	Nobber	Navan
20:00		(HT: 1-3 - 1-5)
		Report		Referee: Patrick Coyle

23 September 2023 Relegation Semi-Final 2	Longwood	1-14 (17) – (22) 3-13	Bective	Boardsmill
17:00		(HT: 1-8 - 2-7)
		Report		Referee: Owen Ganly

=== Relegation final ===
8 October 23 Relegation Final	Longwood	2-13 (19) – (18) 1-15 (a.e.t.)	Dunderry	Boardsmill
11:15		(HT: 1-4 - 1-6) (FT: 2-8 - 1-11)
		Report
