= 2022 Meath Senior Football Championship =

Football league season

130th Meath Senior Football Championship
Tournament details
- County: Meath
- Province: Leinster
- Year: 2022
- Trophy: Keegan Cup
- Sponsor: Fairyhouse Steel
- Date: 5 August - 16 October
- Teams: 16
- Defending champions: Wolfe Tones

Winners
- Champions: Ratoath (3rd win)
- Manager: David Brady
- Captain: Conor McGill

Runners-up
- Runners-up: Summerhill
- Manager: Conor Gillespie
- Captain: Padhraig Geraghty

Promotion/Relegation
- Relegated team(s): Navan O'Mahony's

Other
- Matches played: 38
- Website: Meath GAA

The 2022 Meath Senior Football Championship was the 130th edition of the Meath GAA's premier club Gaelic football tournament for senior clubs in County Meath, Ireland with 16 teams competing. The winner will represent Meath in the Leinster Senior Club Football Championship. The championship starts with a group stage and then progresses to a knock out stage.

Wolfe Tones were the defending champions after they defeated St. Peter's, Dunboyne in the 2021 final to claim their second S.F.C. crown and their first since 2006.

In 2021, Trim won the I.F.C. to return to the Senior Football Championship for the first time since 2011.

The draw for the group stages of the championship was made on 9 May 2022 with the games due to commence on 5 August 2022.

On 16 October 2022, Ratoath won the Keegan Cup by beating Summerhill 0-12 to 0-11 in the final. This was Ratoath's 3rd third Meath Senior Football Championship in their history and their third title in four years. Jack Flynn was awarded man of the match. Navan O'Mahony's were relegated to the Meath Intermediate Football Championship after losing to Seneschalstown in the relegation playoff final. They will compete at intermediate level for the first time since winning the Intermediate Football Championship in 2003 and only 8 years after their latest Keegan Cup win in 2015.

== Championship Structure ==
The 2022 Meath S.F.C. consists of 16 teams drawn into four groups each containing four teams. The top two teams progress to the quarter-finals, while the bottom two in each group contest the Relegation Quarter-Finals. The losers of each Relegation Quarter-Final then contest the Relegation Semi-Finals, the losers of which will play-off for the right to retain their senior status into 2023.

== Team changes ==
The following teams have changed the division since the 2021 championship season.

=== To S.F.C. ===
Promoted from 2021 I.F.C.

- Trim - (Intermediate Champions)

=== From S.F.C. ===
The team Relegated to 2022 I.F.C.

- Dunshaughlin

== Participating teams ==
The teams taking part in the 2022 Meath Senior Football Championship are:

Club	Location	Management	Pre C'ship Odds	2021 Championship Position	2022 Championship Position
Ballinabrackey	Ballinabrackey	Aidan Coffey	33/1	Relegation Semi-Finalist	Relegation Semi-Finalist
Curraha	Curraha	Ruairí Murphy	50/1	Relegation Semi-Finalist	Relegation Quarter-Finalist
Donaghmore/Ashbourne	Ashbourne	Mick Deegan	8/1	Semi-Finalist	Relegation Quarter-Finalist
Gaeil Colmcille	Kells	Luke Dempsey	7/1	Quarter-Finalist	Quarter-Finalist
Moynalvey	Moynalvey & Kiltale	John Donoghue	20/1	Relegation Quarter-Finalist	Quarter-Finalist
Na Fianna	Enfield & Baconstown	Cormac Davey	12/1	Quarter-Finalist	Semi-Finalist
Navan O'Mahonys	Navan	Darren Fay	33/1	Relegation Finalist	Relegated
Ratoath	Ratoath	David Brady	3/1	Semi-Finalist	Champions
Seneschalstown	Kentstown & Yellow Furze	Ciarán Marks	50/1	Relegation Quarter-Finalist	Relegation Finalist
Simonstown Gaels	Navan	Colm O'Rourke	10/1	Relegation Quarter-Finalist	Relegation Quarter-Finalist
Skryne	Skryne & Tara	Davy Byrne	20/1	Relegation Quarter-Finalist	Quarter-Finalist
St. Colmcille's	Bettystown, Donacarney, Laytown & Mornington	Seán Barry & Seán Kelly	25/1	Quarter-Finalist	Relegation Semi-Finalist
St. Peter's Dunboyne	Dunboyne	Trevor O'Sullivan	3/1	Runners-up	Relegation Quarter-Finalist
Summerhill	Summerhill	Conor Gillespie	10/1	Quarter-Finalist	Runners-up
Trim	Trim	Kevin Reilly	20/1	I.F.C. Champions	Quarter-Finalist
Wolfe Tones	Kilberry, Gibbstown, Oristown & Wilkinstown	Michael McDermott	8/1	Champions	Semi-Finalist

== Group stage ==
There are four groups of four teams called Group A, B, C and D. The 1st and 2nd placed teams in each group qualify for the quarter-finals. The 3rd and 4th placed team in each group will proceed to the Relegation Play-Off to determine which team will suffer relegation.

The draw for the group stages of the championship was made on 9 May 2022.

Tiebreakers: If two or more teams were equal on points on completion of the group matches, the following tie-breaking criteria would be applied:

All Football Championships and Leagues shall be run on a combination of a league and knockout basis under Rule 6.21 T.O. Where teams finish equal with points for qualification or relegation process for concluding stages, the positioning shall be decided as follows;

- (i) Where three teams are involved - the outcome of the meetings of the three teams in their previous games in the competition. If three teams finish level on points for three places and one team has beaten the other two teams that team qualifies in first place and other places are determined by the specified order. If there are two positions and one team has beaten the other two teams that team qualifies and the second place is determined by the specified order. If there is one position and one team has beaten the other two team that team qualifies;
- (ii) Where two teams are involved - the outcome of the meeting of the two teams in the previous game in the competition;
- (iii) Scoring Difference;
- (iv) Highest total scores for;
- (v) A play-off.

=== Group A ===
Team	Pld	W	L	D	PF	PA	PD	Pts
Wolfe Tones	3	3	0	0	54	30	+24	6
Skryne	3	1	2	0	44	44	0	2
St. Colmcille's	3	1	2	0	43	54	-11	2
Seneschalstown	3	1	2	0	40	53	-13	2

Round 1

- Wolfe Tones 3-9, 0-12 Skryne, Páirc Tailteann, 5/8/2022
- Seneschalstown 4-11, 0-16 St. Colmcille's, Ardcath, 6/8/2022

Round 2

- Skryne 1-13, 2-3 Seneschalstown, Walterstown, 20/8/2022
- St. Colmcille's 0-10, 1-12 Wolfe Tones, Ashbourne, 21/8/2022

Round 3

- St. Colmcille's 2-11, 0-16 Skryne, Stamullen, 4/9/2022
- Wolfe Tones 4-9, 0-8 Seneschalstown, Simonstown, 4/9/2022

=== Group B ===
Team	Pld	W	L	D	PF	PA	PD	Pts
Trim	3	3	0	0	81	30	+51	6
Moynalvey	3	2	1	0	43	49	-6	4
Navan O'Mahonys	3	1	2	0	49	67	-18	2
Curraha	3	0	3	0	28	55	-27	0

Round 1

- Moynalvey 0-15, 0-7 Curraha, Skryne, 6/8/2022
- Trim 6-13, 1-13 Navan O'Mahony's, Páirc Tailteann, 7/8/2022

Round 2

- Curraha 0-5, 2-15 Trim, Dunsany, 20/8/2022
- Navan O'Mahony's 0-13, 2-14 Moynalvey, Skryne, 21/8/2022

Round 3

- Navan O'Mahony's 1-16, 2-10 Curraha, Seneschalstown, 3/9/2022
- Moynalvey 1-5, 4-17 Trim, Summerhill, 3/9/2022

=== Group C ===
Team	Pld	W	L	D	PF	PA	PD	Pts
Ratoath	3	3	0	0	72	51	+21	6
Gaeil Colmcille	3	2	1	0	49	38	+11	4
Donaghmore/Ashbourne	3	1	2	0	49	50	-1	2
Simonstown Gaels	3	0	3	0	41	72	-31	0

Round 1

- Gaeil Colmcille 0-16, 2-7 Donaghmore/Ashbourne, Páirc Tailteann, 7/8/2022
- Ratoath 5-16, 3-14 Simonstown Gaels, Ashbourne, 7/8/2022

Round 2

- Simonstown Gaels 0-11, 1-18 Gaeil Colmcille, Páirc Tailteann, 20/8/2022
- Donaghmore/Ashbourne 1-13, 4-15 Ratoath, Dunshaughlin, 21/8/2022

Round 3

- Donaghmore/Ashbourne 3-11, 0-7 Simonstown Gaels, Duleek, 2/9/2022
- Ratoath 1-11, 1-9 Gaeil Colmcille, Skryne, 2/9/2022

=== Group D ===
Team	Pld	W	L	D	PF	PA	PD	Pts
Summerhill	3	3	0	0	46	28	+18	6
Na Fianna	3	2	1	0	48	41	+7	4
Ballinabrackey	3	1	2	0	39	43	-4	2
St. Peter's Dunboyne	3	0	3	0	30	51	-21	0

Round 1

- St. Peter's Dunboyne 0-8, 2-11 Summerhill, Trim, 5/8/2022
- Ballinabrackey 1-10, 2-14 Na Fianna, Clonard, 6/8/2022

Round 2

- Summerhill 1-11, 0-8 Ballinabrackey, Clonard, 20/8/2022
- Na Fianna 0-16, 1-10 St. Peter's Dunboyne, Kilcloon, 21/8/2022

Round 3

- Na Fianna 0-12, Summerhill 2-9, Trim, 4/9/2022
- St. Peter's Dunboyne 1-6, 4-6 Ballinabrackey, Páirc Tailteann, 4/9/2022

== Knock-Out Stage ==
The 1st and 2nd placed teams in each group qualify for the quarter-finals. Quarter Final pairings were drawn with one group winner and one 2nd placed team in each pair with no repeat pairings from group stages. Semi Final pairings were determined by an open draw. The draw for the quarter-finals and Semi-Finals took place on 5 September 2022.

Quarter-Finals
Wolfe Tones	0-11
Gaeil Colmcille	0-9
Summerhill	2-19
Skryne	0-8
Trim	0-10
Na Fianna	1-10
Ratoath	3-8
Moynalvey	0-10

Semi-Finals
Wolfe Tones	0-6
Summerhill	1-10
Na Fianna	0-9
Ratoath	3-11

Final
Summerhill	0-11
Ratoath	0-12

=== Quarter-finals ===
18 September 2022 Quarter-Final 1	Wolfe Tones	0-11 (11) – (9) 0-9	Gaeil Colmcille	Navan
16:00 IST (UTC+1)		(HT: 0-2 - 0-5)		Venue: Páirc Tailteann
	Pts: Cian Ward, Saran Ó Fionnagain (3 each), Stephen Sheppard, Caolan Ward (2 each), Thomas O'Reilly (1)	Report	Pts: Brian O'Hanlon, Conal Courtney (2 each), Martin Barrett, Fionn Reilly, Jonny Quigley, Jordan Muldoon, Barry Farrelly (1 each)

17 September 2022 Quarter-Final 2	Trim	0-10 (10) – (13) 1-10	Na Fianna	Clonard
17:00 IST (UTC+1)		(HT: 0-5 - 0-4)
		Report

18 September 2022 Quarter-Final 3	Summerhill	2-19 (25) – (8) 0-8	Skryne	Navan
14:00 IST (UTC+1)		(HT: 0-8 - 0-5)		Venue: Páirc Tailteann
	Gls: Adam Flanagan, John Lavelle (1 each); Pts: Conor Lyons (8), Conor Frayne (3), Eoghan Frayne, Diarmuid McCabe (2 each), Liam Shaw, David Larkin, Padraig Geraghty, Kevin Ryan (1 each)	Report	Pts: Niall Finnerty (3), Mark Battersby (2), Paddy Fox, Darragh Campion, Ciarán Lenehan (1 each)

18 September 2022 Quarter-Final 4	Ratoath	3-8 (17) – (10) 0-10	Moynalvey	Dunshaughlin
16:00 IST (UTC+1)		(HT: 2-5 - 0-5)
		Report

=== Semi-finals ===
2 October 2022 Semi-Final 1	Wolfe Tones	0-6 (6) – (13) 1-10	Summerhill	Navan
14:00 IST (UTC+1)		(HT: 0-4 - 1-3)		Venue: Páirc Tailteann
	Pts: Caolan Ward (2), Cian Ward, Oisín Martin, Tom Gavigan, Niall O'Reilly (1 each)	Report	Gls: Conor Frayne (1); Pts: Conor Frayne, Conor Lyons (3 each), Eoghan Frayne, Barry Dardis (2 each)

2 October 2022 Semi-Final 2	Na Fianna	0-7 (7) – (20) 3-11	Ratoath	Navan
15:45 IST (UTC+1)		(HT: 0-6 - 2-5)		Venue: Páirc Tailteann
		Report

=== Final ===
16 October 2022 Final	Summerhill	0-11 (11) – (12) 0-12	Ratoath	Navan
15:00 IST (UTC+1)		(HT: 0-5 - 0-8)		Venue: Páirc Tailteann
	Pts: Eoghan Frayne (4), Barry Dardis (2), Conor Frayne, Diarmuid McCabe, David Larkin, Padhraig Geraghty, Eamonn McDonnell (1 each)	Report	Pts: Daithí McGowan (4), Éamonn Wallace (3), Bryan McMahon (2), Bobby O'Brien, Cian Rogers, Jack Flynn (1 each)

== Relegation play-off ==
The Relegation Play-Off consisted of the 3rd and 4th-placed finishers in each group. The winners of each playoff retained their senior status while the outright loser was relegated to the Intermediate championship for 2023. The draw for the relegation playoffs took place on 5 September 2022.

=== Relegation Quarter-Finals ===
17 September 2022 Relegation Quarter-Final 1	St. Colmcille's	0-14 (14) – (17) 1-14	Curraha	Seneschalstown
17:00 IST (UTC+1)		(HT: 0-11 - 1-6)
		Report

18 September 2022 Relegation Quarter-Final 2	Navan O'Mahony's	0-13 (13) – (20) 3-11	St. Peter's Dunboyne	Skryne
18:30 IST (UTC+1)		(HT: 0-7 - 2-5)
		Report

18 September 2022 Relegation Quarter-Final 3	Donaghmore/Ashbourne	2-15 (21) – (13) 2-7	Seneschalstown	Donore
12:00 IST (UTC+1)		(HT: 2-7 - 1-5)
		Report

18 September 2022 Relegation Quarter-Final 4	Ballinabrackey	1-18 (21) – (21) 3-12 (a.e.t.) (4-5 pen)	Simonstown Gaels	Trim
15:00 IST (UTC+1)		(HT: 0-4 - 1-4)
		Report
		Penalty shootout

=== Relegation Semi-Finals ===
30 September 2022 Relegation Semi-Final 1	Seneschalstown	0-16 (16) – (21) 1-18 (a.e.t.)	St. Colmcille's	Skryne
20:00 IST (UTC+1)

1 October 2022 Relegation Semi-Final 2	Ballinabrackey	0-13 (13) – (4) 0-4	Navan O'Mahony's	Trim
16:00 IST (UTC+1)		(HT: 0-5 - 0-3)
		Report

=== Relegation Final ===
Relegation Final	Seneschalstown	4-9 (21) – (16) 3-7	Navan O'Mahony's	Ashbourne
		(HT: 4-5 - 2-3)
		Report
