= 2021 Meath Intermediate Football Championship =

Gaelic football competition

95th Meath Intermediate Football Championship
Tournament details
- County: Meath
- Province: Leinster
- Year: 2021
- Trophy: Mattie McDonnell Cup
- Sponsor: Meade Potato
- Date: 13 August 2021 - 6 November 2021
- Teams: 20
- Defending champions: Ballinabrackey

Winners
- Champions: Trim (2nd win)
- Manager: Kevin Reilly
- Captain: Alan Douglas

Runners-up
- Runners-up: Oldcastle

Promotion/Relegation
- Promoted team(s): Trim
- Relegated team(s): Ballinlough, Moylagh, Syddan

Other
- Matches played: 42
- Website: Meath GAA

The 2021 Meath Intermediate Football Championship is the 95th edition of the Meath GAA's premier club Gaelic football tournament for Intermediate graded teams in County Meath, Ireland. The tournament consists of 20 teams and starts with a group stage before progressing to a knock out stage. The winner will represent Meath in the Leinster Intermediate Club Football Championship.

Ballinabrackey were the 2020 Meath Intermediate Football Champions after they defeated Trim in the final. As a result, they will compete in the 2021 Meath Senior Football Championship.

Nobber were relegated from the Senior Football Championship in 2020 after just one season in the Senior Football Championship. Ballivor returned to the I.F.C. for the first time since 2017 after beating St. Vincent's in the 2020 Meath Junior Football Championship final. Castletown were relegated to the 2021 Meath Junior Football Championship. They will play at the junior grade for the first time in their history.

The draw for the group stages of the championship took place on 20 June 2021 with the games commencing on 13 August 2021.

== Championship structure ==
The championship will consist of five groups with each containing four teams. The top two teams in each group will progress to the knockout stages while the bottom team in each group will contest the relegation playoffs.

== Team changes ==
The following teams changed division since the 2020 championship season:

=== From I.F.C. ===
Promoted to 2021 S.F.C.

- Ballinabrackey - (Intermediate Champions)

Relegated to 2021 Meath Junior Football Championship

- Castletown

=== To I.F.C. ===
Relegated from 2020 S.F.C.

- Nobber

Promoted from 2020 J.F.C.

- Ballivor - (Junior 'A' Champions)

== Participating teams ==
The teams taking part in the 2021 Meath Intermediate Football Championship are:

Club	Location	Management	2020 Championship Position	2021 Championship Position
Ballinlough	Ballinlough & Kilskyre		Relegation Playoff	Relegated to 2022 JFC
Ballivor	Ballivor		Junior 'A' Champions	Preliminary Quarter-Finalist
Bective	Navan		Non Qualifier	Non Qualifier
Blackhall Gaels	Batterstown and Kilcloon		Non Qualifier	Quarter-Finalist
Clann na nGael	Athboy and Rath Cairn		Quarter-Finalist	Preliminary Quarter-Finalist
Drumbaragh Emmets	Drumbaragh, Kells		Relegation Playoff	Non Qualifier
Duleek/Bellewstown	Duleek & Bellewstown		Non-Qualifier	Quarter-Finalist
Dunderry	Dunderry		Non-Qualifier	Quarter-Finalist
Kilmainham	Kilmainham, Kells		Semi-Finalist	Relegation Playoff
Longwood	Longwood		Non-Qualifier	Non Qualifier
Meath Hill	Meath Hill		Non-Qualifier	Non Qualifier
Moylagh	Moylagh		Non-Qualifier	Relegated to 2022 JFC
Nobber	Nobber		Relegated from 2020 SFC	Quarter-Finalist
Oldcastle	Oldcastle		Relegation Playoff	Finalists
Rathkenny	Rathkenny & Stackallan		Non-Qualifier	Semi-Finalist
St. Michael's	Carlanstown & Kilbeg		Semi-Finalist	Non Qualifier
St. Patrick's	Stamullen		Relegation Playoff	Relegation Playoff
Syddan	Lobinstown		Non Qualifier	Relegated to 2022 JFC
Trim	St Lomans Park, Trim		Finalists	Champions
Walterstown	Johnstown		Non-Qualifier	Semi-Finalist

== Group stage ==
There are five groups of four teams called Group A, B, C, D and E. The 1st placed teams in each group along with the 2nd placed team in group A automatically qualify for the quarter-finals. The 2nd placed teams in Groups B, C, D & E qualify for the preliminary Quarter-finals with the winners progressing to the quarter-finals.

Three teams will be relegated from IFC to JFC in both 2021 and 2022 in order to bring the IFC from 20 teams to 16 teams. In 2021, the last placed teams in each group (five teams in total) will be entered into an open draw to contest the relegation playoffs as follows:

- 1 v 2
- Winner of 1v2 will play 3
- 4 v 5

The loser of each playoff game will be relegated to the 2022 JFC while two teams will preserve their intermediate status.

Tiebreakers: If two or more teams were equal on points on completion of the group matches, the following tie-breaking criteria would be applied:

All Football Championships and Leagues shall be run on a combination of a league and knockout basis under Rule 6.21 T.O. Where teams finish equal with points for qualification or relegation process for concluding stages, the positioning shall be decided as follows;

- (i) Where three teams are involved - the outcome of the meetings of the three teams in their previous games in the competition. If three teams finish level on points for three places and one team has beaten the other two teams that team qualifies in first place and other places are determined by the specified order. If there are two positions and one team has beaten the other two teams that team qualifies and the second place is determined by the specified order. If there is one position and one team has beaten the other two team that team qualifies;
- (ii) Where two teams are involved - the outcome of the meeting of the two teams in the previous game in the competition;
- (iii) Scoring Difference;
- (iv) Highest total scores for;
- (v) A play-off.

=== Group A ===
Team	Pld	W	L	D	PF	PA	PD	Pts
Blackhall Gaels	3	2	1	0	37	33	+4	4
Nobber	3	2	1	0	52	38	+14	4
Bective	3	1	1	1	40	45	-5	3
St. Patrick's	3	0	2	1	38	51	-13	1

Round 1

- Nobber 1-7, 1-10 Blackhall Gaels, Trim, 13/8/2021
- St. Patrick's 2-9, 2-9 Bective, Duleek, 15/8/2021

Round 2

- Blackhall Gaels 0-12, 0-9 St. Patrick's, Kilbride, 28/8/2021
- Bective 1-8, 2-12 Nobber, Bective, 28/8/2021

Round 3

- Bective 1-11, 1-9 Blackhall Gaels, Summerhill, 12/9/2021
- Nobber 3-15, 1-11 St. Patrick's, Seneschalstown, 12/9/2021

=== Group B ===
Team	Pld	W	L	D	PF	PA	PD	Pts
Trim	3	3	0	0	66	35	+31	6
Clann na nGael	3	2	1	0	47	43	+4	4
Longwood	3	1	2	0	49	58	-9	2
Moylagh	3	0	3	0	29	55	-26	0

Round 1

- Clann na nGael 3-14, 0-14 Longwood, Clonard, 24/8/2021
- Trim 2-18, 0-7 Moylagh, Cortown, 15/8/2021,

Round 2

- Longwood 1-11, 2-16 Trim, Boardsmill, 29/8/2021
- Moylagh 1-6, 1-7 Clann na nGael, Ballinlough, 29/8/2021

Round 3

- Moylagh 1-10, 2-15 Longwood, Kildalkey, 12/9/2021
- Clann na nGael 2-8, 3-11 Trim, Páirc Tailteann, 12/9/2021

=== Group C ===
Team	Pld	W	L	D	PF	PA	PD	Pts
Oldcastle	3	2	0	1	58	46	+12	5
Walterstown	3	2	0	1	58	47	+11	5
Meath Hill	3	1	2	0	53	47	-4	2
Syddan	3	0	3	0	43	62	-19	0

Round 1

- Walterstown 0-17, 1-9 Syddan, Castletown, 13/8/2021
- Oldcastle 2-10, 1-12 Meath Hill, Pairc Tailteann, 15/8/2021

Round 2

- Oldcastle 3-14, 1-9 Syddan, Moynalty, 27/8/2021
- Walterstown 2-16, 1-13 Meath Hill, Nobber, 28/8/2021

Round 3

- Oldcastle 2-13, 1-16 Walterstown, Kilmainham, 12/9/2021
- Syddan 3-10, 2-16 Meath Hill, Drumconrath, 12/9/2021

=== Group D ===
Team	Pld	W	L	D	PF	PA	PD	Pts
Duleek/Bellewstown	3	3	0	0	80	41	+39	6
Ballivor	3	2	1	0	62	46	+16	4
Drumbaragh Emmets	3	0	2	1	52	71	-19	1
Kilmainham	3	0	2	1	40	76	-36	1

Round 1

- Ballivor 2-20, 1-14 Drumbaragh, Bohermeen, 15/8/2021
- Duleek/Bellewstown 6-16, 0-12 Kilmainham, Ardcath, 19/8/2021

Round 2

- Drumbaragh 3-10, 2-13 Kilmainham, Páirc Tailteann, 28/8/2021
- Duleek/Bellewstown 2-14, 0-13 Ballivor, Bective, 29/8/2021

Round 3

- Duleek/Bellewstown 2-20, 2-10 Drumbaragh, Simonstown, 10/9/2021
- Ballivor -vs- Kilmainham, Cortown, 10/9/2021

=== Group E ===
Team	Pld	W	L	D	PF	PA	PD	Pts
Rathkenny	3	3	0	0	50	28	+22	6
Dunderry	3	2	1	0	46	35	+11	4
St. Michael's	3	1	2	0	26	50	-24	2
Ballinlough	3	0	3	0	37	46	-9	0

Round 1

- Rathkenny 0-13, 1-5 Dunderry, Walterstown, 14/8/2021
- St. Michael's 0-11, 0-10 Ballinlough, Martry, 15/8/2021

Round 2

- Ballinlough 1-10, 1-13 Rathkenny, Kilmainhamwood, 28/8/2021
- Dunderry 1-16, 0-8 St. Michael's, Kilmainham, 29/8/2021

Round 3

- Dunderry 2-13, 1-11 Ballinlough, Bohermeen, 12/9/2021
- St. Michael's 0-7, 2-15 Rathkenny, Nobber, 12/9/2021

== Knock-out stage ==
The 1st placed teams each group and the 2nd placed team in Group A qualify for the quarter-finals. The 2nd places teams in Groups B, C, D and E qualify for the preliminary Quarter-finals with the winners progressing to the quarter-finals.

Preliminary quarter-finals
Clann na nGael	1-11
Walterstown	1-13
Ballivor	1-6
Dunderry	1-9

Quarter-Finals
Blackhall Gaels	0-5
Walterstown	2-14
Trim	4-18
Dunderry	0-8
Nobber	1-10
Oldcastle	4-8
Duleek/Bellewstown	0-9
Rathkenny	1-16

Semi-Finals
Walterstown	2-6
Trim	1-14
Oldcastle	0-12
Rathkenny	0-8

Final
Trim	3-12
Oldcastle	0-7

=== Preliminary quarter-finals ===
25 September 2021 Preliminary Quarter-final 1	Clann na nGael	1-11 (14) – (16) 1-13	Walterstown	Navan
15:15 IST (UTC+1)				Venue: Páirc Tailteann
				Referee: Stephen Dawson

26 September 2021 Preliminary Quarter-final 2	Ballivor	1-6 (9) – (12) 1-9	Dunderry	Trim
16:00 IST (UTC+1)
				Referee: Owen Ganly

=== Quarter-finals ===
9 October 2021 Quarter-final 1	Walterstown	2-14 (20) – (5) 0-5	Blackhall Gaels	Ratoath
16:30 IST (UTC+1)		(HT: 0-4 - 0-2)		Venue: Seán Eiffe Park
				Referee: Patrick Coyle

10 October 2021 Quarter-final 2	Dunderry	0-8 (8) – (30) 4-18	Trim	Navan
13:45 IST (UTC+1)		(HT: 0-5 - 1-9)		Venue: Páirc Tailteann
				Referee: Padraic Coyle

9 October 2021 Quarter-final 3	Nobber	1-10 (13) – (20) 4-8	Oldcastle	Ballinlough
17:00 IST (UTC+1)		(HT: 1-6 - 2-4)
				Referee: Kieran Olwell

10 October 2021 Quarter-final 4	Duleek/Bellewstown	0-9 (9) – (19) 1-16	Rathkenny	Slane
11:30 IST (UTC+1)		(HT: 0-9 - 0-5)
				Referee: Stephen Dawson

=== Semi-finals ===
25 October 2021 Semi-final 1	Walterstown	2-6 (12) – (17) 1-14	Trim	Navan
13:00 IST (UTC+1)		(HT: 2-4 - 1-8)		Venue: Páirc Tailteann
				Referee: Cormac Reilly

25 October 2021 Semi-final 2	Oldcastle	0-12 (12) – (8) 0-8	Rathkenny	Navan
15:00 IST (UTC+1)		(HT: 0-7 - 0-2)		Venue: Páirc Tailteann
				Referee: Padraic Coyle

=== Final ===
6 November 2021 Final	Trim	3-12 (21) – (7) 0-7	Oldcastle	Navan
14:45 GMT (UTC)		(HT: 2-4 - 0-5)		Venue: Páirc Tailteann
	Gls: Aaron Lynch, Eoin O'Connor, Declan Dowling (1 each); Pts: Aaron Lynch (5), Alan Douglas (2), Eoin O'Connor, James Toher, Rob Bourke, Ciaran Caulfield, Daire Lynch (1 each)		Pts: Robert Farrelly (3), CJ Healy (2), Garrett O'Reilly, Patrick Rahill (1 each)	Referee: Keith Sheerin

== Relegation play-off ==
Three teams were relegated from the 2021 IFC. The 4th placed teams in each group contested the relegation playoffs. Each team was entered into an open draw which consists of three games. The loser of each game was relegated to the 2022 JFC while the winners of Relegation play-offs 2 & 3 preserved their intermediate status.

=== Relegation play-off matches ===
10 October 2021 Relegation Play-Off 1	St. Patrick's	0-14 (14) – (8) 0-8	Ballinlough	Seneschalstown
13:00 IST (UTC+1)		(HT: 0-8 - 0-2)
				Referee: Patrick Clarke

23 October 2021 Relegation Play-Off 2	St. Patrick's	2-13 (19) – (3) 0-3	Moylagh	Walterstown
16:00 IST (UTC+1)		(HT: 1-7 - 0-1)
				Referee: Keith Sheeran

22 October 2021 Relegation Play-Off 3	Kilmainham	2-6 (12) – (10) 0-10	Syddan	Moynalty
20:00 IST (UTC+1)		(HT: 1-4 - 0-6)
				Referee: Andrew Smith
