= 2021 Meath Senior Football Championship =

Football league season

129th Meath Senior Football Championship
Tournament details
- County: Meath
- Province: Leinster
- Year: 2021
- Trophy: Keegan Cup
- Sponsor: Fairyhouse Steel
- Date: 13 August - 8 November
- Teams: 16
- Defending champions: Ratoath

Winners
- Champions: Wolfe Tones (2nd win)
- Manager: Michael McDermott
- Captain: Shane Glynn

Runners-up
- Runners-up: St. Peter's Dunboyne
- Manager: Conor O'Donohue

Promotion/Relegation
- Relegated team(s): Dunshaughlin

Other
- Matches played: 38
- Total scored: 98-871 (1165 points)
- Website: Meath GAA

The 2021 Meath Senior Football Championship was the 129th edition of the Meath GAA's premier club Gaelic football tournament for senior clubs in County Meath, Ireland with 16 teams competing. The winner went on to represent Meath in the Leinster Senior Club Football Championship. The championship started with a group stage and then progressed to a knock out stage.

Ratoath were the defending champions after they defeated Gaeil Colmcille in the 2020 final to claim their second S.F.C. crown and their second S.F.C. championship in a row.

In 2020, Ballinabrackey won the I.F.C. for the first time in their history to reach the top flight.

The draw for the group stages of the championship were made on 20 June 2021 with the games commencing on 13 August 2021.

On 7 November 2021, Wolfe Tones won the Keegan Cup by beating St. Peter's Dunboyne 1-9 to 0-9 in the final. This was Wolfe Tones' second Keegan Cup success in their history and their first since 2006. Wolfe Tones captain and defender, Shane Glynn, was awarded the Man of the Match.

Dunshaughlin were relegated to the Meath Intermediate Football Championship after losing to Navan O'Mahony's in the relegation playoff final. They went on compete at Intermediate level for the first time since winning the 1997 Meath Intermediate Football Championship.

== Championship structure ==
The 2021 Meath S.F.C. consisted of 16 teams drawn into four groups each containing four teams. The top two teams progressed to the quarter-finals, while the bottom two in each group contested the Relegation Quarter-Finals. The losers of each Relegation Quarter-Final then contested the Relegation Semi-Finals, the losers of which entered a play-off for the right to retain their senior status into 2022.

== Team changes ==
The following teams changed division since the 2020 championship season.

=== To S.F.C. ===
Promoted from 2020 I.F.C.

- Ballinabrackey - (Intermediate Champions)

=== From S.F.C. ===
Relegated to 2021 I.F.C.

- Nobber

== Participating teams ==
The teams taking part in the 2021 Meath Senior Football Championship were:

Club	Location	Management	Pre C'ship Odds	2020 Championship Position	2021 Championship Position
Ballinabrackey	Ballinabrackey	Gordon McDonnell	100/1	I.F.C. Champions	Relegation Semi-Finalist
Curraha	Curraha		40/1	Relegation Play-Off	Relegation Semi-Finalist
Donaghmore/Ashbourne	Ashbourne		10/1	Non Qualifier	Semi-Finalist
Dunshaughlin	Dunshaughlin & Drumree	Martin Reilly	40/1	Relegation Playoff	Relegated
Gaeil Colmcille	Kells	Lar Wall	9/2	Finalist	Quarter-Finalist
Moynalvey	Moynalvey & Kiltale	Sean Duggan	10/1	Non Qualifier	Relegation Quarter-Finalist
Na Fianna	Enfield & Baconstown		16/1	Semi-Finalist	Quarter-Finalist
Navan O'Mahonys	Navan	Davy Nelson	14/1	Non Qualifier	Relegation Finalist
Ratoath	Ratoath	Brian Farrell	2/1	Champions	Semi-Finalist
Seneschalstown	Kentstown & Yellow Furze	Anthony Malone	40/1	Relegation Play-Off	Relegation Quarter-Finalist
Simonstown Gaels	Navan	Colm O'Rourke	10/1	Non Qualifier	Relegation Quarter-Finalist
Skryne	Skryne & Tara		28/1	Non Qualifier	Relegation Quarter-Finalist
St. Colmcille's	Bettystown, Donacarney, Laytown & Mornington		40/1	Non Qualifier	Quarter-Finalist
St. Peter's Dunboyne	Dunboyne	Conor O'Donoghue	4/1	Non-Qualifier	Runners-up
Summerhill	Summerhill	Paschal Kellaghan	7/1	Semi-Finalist	Quarter-Finalist
Wolfe Tones	Kilberry, Gibbstown, Oristown & Wilkinstown	Michael McDermott	16/1	Non Qualifier	Champions

== Group stage ==
There were four groups of four teams called Group A, B, C and D. The 1st and 2nd placed teams in each group qualified for the quarter-finals. The 3rd and 4th placed team in each group proceeded to the Relegation Play-Off to determine which team were relegated.

The draw for the group stages of the championship were made on 20 June 2021.

Tiebreakers: If two or more teams were equal on points on completion of the group matches, the following tie-breaking criteria would be applied:

All Football Championships and Leagues shall be run on a combination of a league and knockout basis under Rule 6.21 T.O. Where teams finish equal with points for qualification or relegation process for concluding stages, the positioning shall be decided as follows;

- (i) Where three teams are involved - the outcome of the meetings of the three teams in their previous games in the competition. If three teams finish level on points for three places and one team has beaten the other two teams that team qualifies in first place and other places are determined by the specified order. If there are two positions and one team has beaten the other two teams that team qualifies and the second place is determined by the specified order. If there is one position and one team has beaten the other two team that team qualifies;
- (ii) Where two teams are involved - the outcome of the meeting of the two teams in the previous game in the competition;
- (iii) Scoring Difference;
- (iv) Highest total scores for;
- (v) A play-off.

=== Group A ===
Team	Pld	W	L	D	PF	PA	PD	Pts
Ratoath	3	3	0	0	57	35	+22	6
Donaghmore/Ashbourne	3	1	2	0	49	43	+6	2
Dunshaughlin	3	1	2	0	45	57	-12	2
Navan O'Mahonys	3	1	2	0	38	54	-16	2

Round 1

- Ratoath 1-18, 1-8 Dunshaughlin, Ashbourne, 15/8/2021
- Donaghmore/Ashbourne 0-13, 1-11 Navan O'Mahonys, Dunshaughlin, 15/8/2021

Round 2

- Donaghmore/Ashbourne 0-14, 2-12 Ratoath, Páirc Tailteann, 29/8/2021
- Dunshaughlin 4-11, 2-8 Navan O'Mahony's, Dunsany, 29/8/2021

Round 3

- Dunshaughlin 1-8, 2-16 Donaghmore/Ashbourne, Skryne, 10/9/2021
- Navan O'Mahony's 0-10, 1-15 Ratoath, Donore, 10/9/2021

=== Group B ===
Team	Pld	W	L	D	PF	PA	PD	Pts
Na Fianna	3	2	0	1	64	46	+18	5
St. Colmcille's	3	2	1	0	73	47	+26	4
Ballinabrackey	3	1	1	1	52	59	-7	3
Curraha	3	0	3	0	39	76	-37	0

Round 1

- St. Colmcille's 4-17, 2-10 Ballinabrackey, Pairc Tailteann, 14/8/2021
- Na Fianna 3-18, 1-12 Curraha, Trim, 15/8/2021

Round 2

- Na Fianna 2-11, 0-11 St. Colmcille's, Páirc Tailteann, 28/8/2021
- Ballinabrackey 1-13, 2-4 Curraha, Summerhill, 29/8/2021

Round 3

- Na Fianna 3-11, 3-11 Ballinabrackey, Clonard, 12/9/2021
- St. Colmcille's 4-21, 2-8 Curraha, Ardcath, 12/9/2021

=== Group C ===
Team	Pld	W	L	D	PF	PA	PD	Pts
Gaeil Colmcille	3	2	0	1	56	40	+16	5
Wolfe Tones	3	2	0	1	52	37	+15	5
Moynalvey	3	1	2	0	49	64	-15	2
Simonstown Gaels	3	0	3	0	45	61	-16	0

Round 1

- Simonstown Gaels 1-15, 1-16 Moynalvey, Skryne, 15/8/2021
- Gaeil Colmcille 1-7, 1-7 Wolfe Tones, Pairc Tailteann, 15/8/2021

Round 2

- Moynalvey 2-7, 3-15 Gaeil Colmcille, Trim, 29/8/2021
- Wolfe Tones 2-14, 0-10 Simonstown Gaels, Páirc Tailteann, 29/8/2021

Round 3

- Wolfe Tones 3-13, 2-11 Moynalvey, Skryne, 12/9/2021
- Simonstown Gaels 2-11, 1-19 Gaeil Colmcille, Páirc Tailteann, 12/9/2021

=== Group D ===
Team	Pld	W	L	D	PF	PA	PD	Pts
St. Peter's Dunboyne	3	2	0	1	58	31	+27	5
Summerhill	3	2	1	0	48	46	+2	4
Skryne	3	1	1	1	46	41	+5	3
Seneschalstown	3	0	3	0	37	71	-34	0

Round 1

- St. Peter's Dunboyne 0-10, 0-10 Skryne, Pairc Tailteann, 13/8/2021
- Summerhill 1-15, 2-9 Seneschalstown, Pairc Tailteann, 15/8/2021

Round 2

- St. Peter's Dunboyne 4-20, 2-6 Seneschalstown, Skryne, 27/8/2021
- Summerhill 1-18, 1-12 Skryne, Moynalvey, 28/8/2021

Round 3

- Summerhill 1-6, 1-13 St. Peter's Dunboyne, Páirc Tailteann, 12/9/2021
- Skryne 4-9, 1-7 Seneschalstown, Stamullen, 12/9/2021

== Knock-out stage ==
The 1st and 2nd placed teams in each group qualify for the quarter-finals.

Quarter-Finals
Ratoath	0-14
Summerhill	0-11
Na Fianna	1-13
Wolfe Tones	3-10
Gaeil Colmcille	1-11
Donaghmore/Ashbourne	1-15
St. Peter's Dunboyne	2-14
St. Colmcille's	0-12

Semi-Finals
Ratoath	1-8
Wolfe Tones	0-13
Donaghmore/Ashbourne	0-5
St. Peter's Dunboyne	0-9

Final
Wolfe Tones	1-9
St. Peter's Dunboyne	0-9

=== Quarter-finals ===
9 October 2021 Quarter-Final 1	Ratoath	0-14 (14) – (11) 0-11	Summerhill	Navan
16:00 IST (UTC+1)		(HT: 0-8 - 0-6)		Venue: Páirc Tailteann
	Pts: Daithí McGowan (4, 3f), Joey Wallace (3), Gavin McGowan, Bryan McMahon (1f), Cian Rogers (2 each), Jack Flynn (1f)		Pts: Eoghan Frayne (4, 2f), Conor Lyons (2f), David Dalton (2), Diarmuid McCabe, Adam McDonnell (1 each)	Referee: David Coldrick

9 October 2021 Quarter-Final 2	Na Fianna	1-13 (16) – (19) 3-10	Wolfe Tones	Trim
16:30 IST (UTC+1)		(HT: 1-7 - 0-5)
	Gls: Jack McNally (1); Pts: Daniel Queeney (4), Jack McNally, Shane Walsh (3 each), Jamie Queeney, Ethan Devine, Paul Kennedy (1 each)		Gls: Cian Ward (2), Cian O'Neill (1); Pts: Cian Ward (5), Oisín Martin (2), Conor Sheppard, Niall O'Reilly, Saran O Fionnagain (1 each)	Referee: Andrew Smith

9 October 2021 Quarter-Final 3	Gaeil Colmcille	1-11 (14) – (18) 1-15	Donaghmore/Ashbourne	Navan
16:30 IST (UTC+1)		(HT: 0-5 - 1-9)		Venue: Páirc Tailteann
	Gls: Andrew Tormey (1); Pts: Michael Deegan (9, 4f), Dylan Brady (2), Andrew Tormey, Shaun Byrne, Bryan Menton, Andrew Colgan (f) (1 each)		Gls: Adam Muldoon (1); Pts: Brian Hanlon (5, 3f, 1 45), Seamus Mattinoe (5, 2f), Adam Muldoon (1)	Referee: Keith Sheerin

8 October 2021 Quarter-Final 4	St. Peter's Dunboyne	2-14 (20) – (12) 0-12	St. Colmcille's	Ashbourne
20:00 IST (UTC+1)		(HT: 0-8 - 0-6)
				Referee: David Coldrick

=== Semi-finals ===
24 October 2021 Semi Final 1	Ratoath	1-8 (11) – (13) 0-13	Wolfe Tones	Navan
15:30 IST (UTC+1)		(HT: 0-2 - 0-7)		Venue: Páirc Tailteann
				Referee: Patrick Coyle

23 October 2021 Semi-Final 2	Donaghmore/Ashbourne	0-5 (5) – (9) 0-9	St. Peter's Dunboyne	Navan
16:30 IST (UTC+1)		(HT: 0-2 - 0-4)		Venue: Páirc Tailteann
				Referee: David Coldrick

=== Final ===
7 November 2021 Final	Wolfe Tones	1-9 (12) – (9) 0-9	St. Peter's Dunboyne	Navan
14:30 GMT (UTC)		(HT: 1-5 - 0-4)		Venue: Páirc Tailteann
	Gls: Saran O'Fionnagain; Pts: Saran O'Fionnagain, Cian Ward, Thomas O'Reilly (2 each), Caolan Ward, Padraic Diamond, Niall O'Reilly (1 each)		Pts: Donal Lenihan (6), Stuart Lowndes, Conor Dolan, Craig Lowndes (1 each)	Referee: Patrick Coyle

== Relegation play-off ==
The Relegation Play-Off consisted of the 3rd and 4th-placed finishers in each group. The winners of each playoff retained their senior status while the outright loser was relegated to the Intermediate championship for 2022. Navan O'Mahony's defeated Dunshaughlin in the relegation final to retain their senior status while Dunshaughlin were relegated to the 2022 Meath Intermediate Football Championship.

=== Relegation quarter-finals ===
8 October 2021 Relegation Quarter-Final 1	Dunshaughlin	1-9 (12) – (14) 1-11	Seneschalstown	Skryne
20:00 IST (UTC+1)		(HT: 1-6 - 1-3)
				Referee: Cormac Reilly

10 October 2021 Relegation Quarter-Final 2	Ballinabrackey	1-8 (11) – (20) 2-14	Simonstown Gaels	Trim
15:00 IST (UTC+1)		(HT: 1-4 - 1-9)
				Referee: Joseph Curran

26 September 2021 Relegation Quarter-Final 3	Moynalvey	1-15 (18) – (10) 0-7	Navan O'Mahony's	Trim
13:30 IST (UTC+1)		(HT: 0-6 - 1-2)
	Gls: Stephen Donoghue; Pts: Cillian O'Sullivan (7, 2f), Mark O'Sullivan (4, 3f), David Reilly, Seán Duggan, Brian O'Reilly, David McLoughlin (1 each)		Gls: Evan Coffey; Pts: Brian O'Hanlon, Jake Regan (3 each), Conor Finnegan (1)	Referee: Kieran Olwell

10 October 2021 Relegation Quarter-Final 4	Skryne	0-16 (16) – (9) 0-9	Curraha	Trim
13:00 IST (UTC+1)		(HT: 0-3 - 0-4)
				Referee: Barry Tiernan

=== Relegation semi-finals ===
24 October 2021 Relegation Semi-Final 1	Dunshaughlin	1-7 (10) – (16) 1-13	Ballinabrackey	Trim
14:30 IST (UTC+1)		(HT: 0-4 - 0-4)
				Referee: Kieran Olwell

22 October 2021 Relegation Semi-Final 2	Navan O'Mahony's	0-9 (9) – (12) 0-12	Curraha	Skryne
20:00 IST (UTC+1)		(HT: 0-5 - 0-8)
				Referee: Barry Tiernan

=== Relegation final ===
5 November 2021 Relegation Final	Dunshaughlin	0-4 (4) – (16) 1-13	Navan O'Mahony's	Dunganny
20:00 GMT (UTC)		(HT: 0-2 - 0-7)
	Pts: Niall Murphy, Matthew Costello, Cian Gallogly, Luke Mitchell (1 each)		Gls: Jake Regan; Pts: Jake Regan (5), Brian O'Hanlon (3), James O'Reilly, Darragh Maguire, Conor Finnegan, Duggie Dillon, Niall McKeigue (1 each)	Referee: David Coldrick
