= Johnstown, Navan =

Village in Ireland

Coordinates: 53.6376°N 6.6547°W

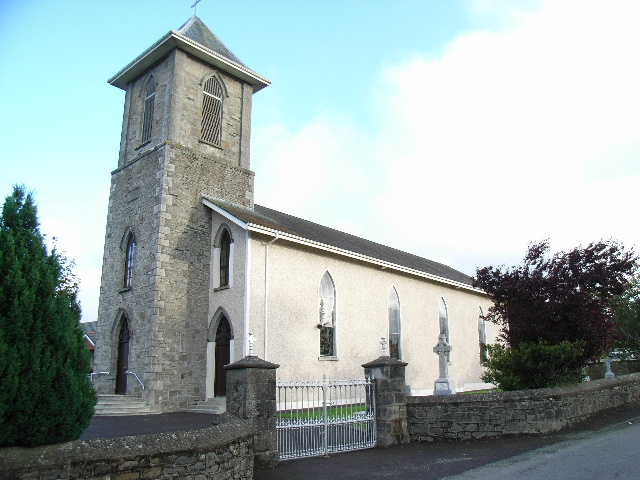
Church of the Nativity of Our Lady, Johnstown.

Johnstown (Irish: Baile Sheáin) is a village in County Meath, Ireland. Located about 3 kilometres (2 mi) southeast of Navan, the village is 40 km (30 mi) northwest of the Dublin city centre. The village lies close to the R147 Regional Road. The surrounding area is primarily agricultural.

It is the home of the Walterstown GAA football club, and Johnstown FC.

== Amenities ==
The village of Johnstown is served by two schools, St Stephens National School and Coláiste na Mí. Between 2000 and 2008, development in the area transformed it from a tranquil country setting to a small growing commuter town. Amenities include Johnstown Shopping Centre, as well as Johnstown Park and IDA centre.

== See also ==
- List of towns and villages in Ireland
