= William Skrene =

Irish judge

William Skrene (c. 1357/8–1419/20) was an Irish-born barrister and judge who spent most of his adult life in England, where he became King's Serjeant and a judge of assize. He also served briefly as Chief Baron of the Irish Exchequer in 1395-7. He acquired substantial lands in Essex.

== Early life ==
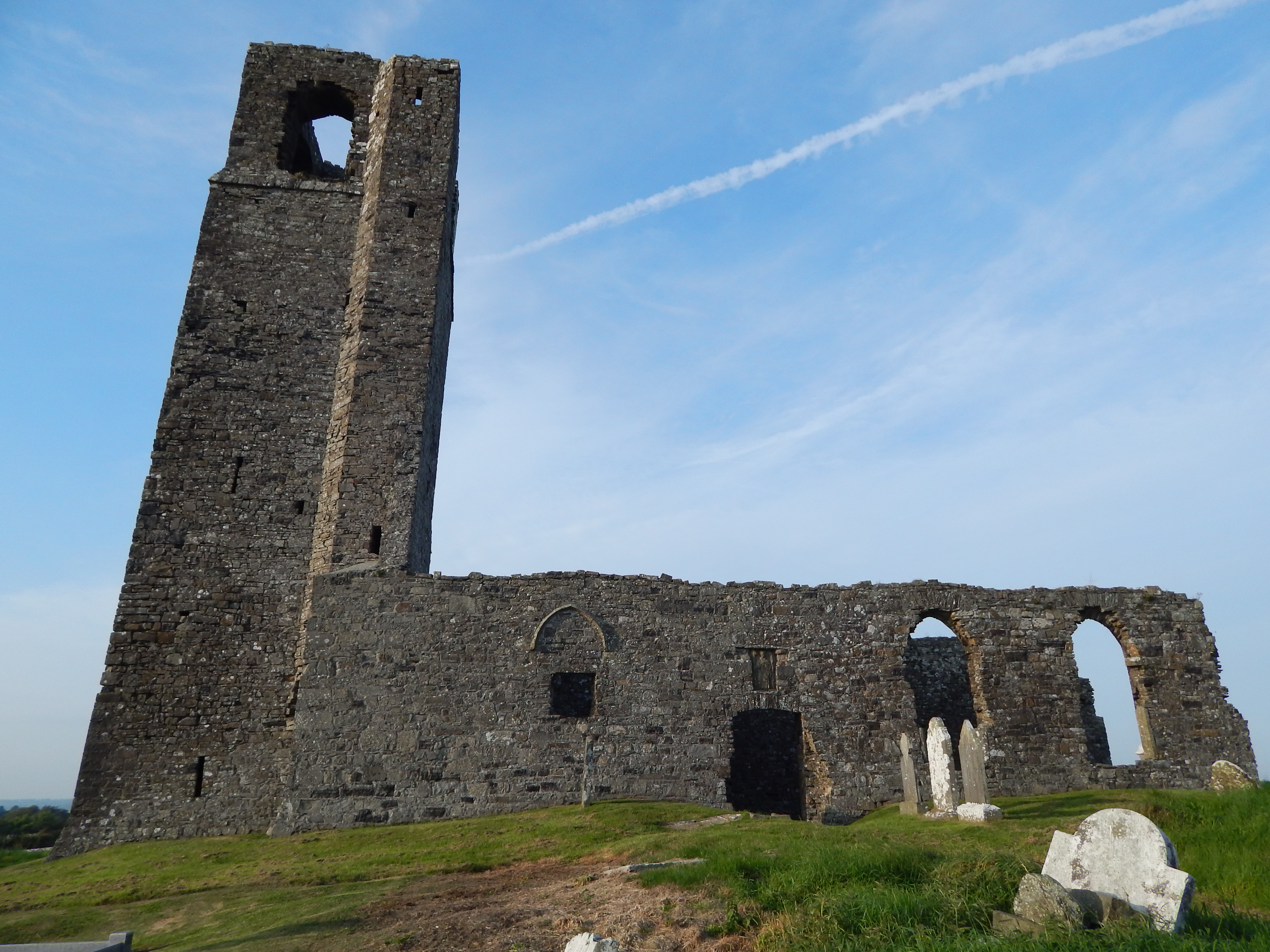
Skryne Church- the Skrene family took their name from the village of Skryne, or Skreen

He was probably born in 1357 or 1358. He came from a family originally from County Meath which derived its name from the village of Skryne, or Skreen. He was later described as being "of Dundalk", County Louth, and apparently grew up there. His father was Thomas Skrene, who was prominent in local affairs, and was probably a burgess of Dundalk. He had two sisters: Christina, whose descendants ultimately inherited her brother's estates, and Isabel, whose heirs unsuccessfully claimed the Skrene inheritance.

== Early career ==
By his own account, he endeavoured for several years to study law in Dublin, but was prevented by the fact that Ireland, until the sixteenth century, had no formal law school, and students could not travel abroad without leave. In about 1378 he obtained the necessary permission to go to England to study law as an "apprentice" at Clifford's Inn. He was called to the bar, but abandoned his plans to practice law in Ireland. He opted to practise in England instead, and became a Serjeant-at-law in 1396, and King's Serjeant in 1408. He was chosen as King's Serjeant in preference to Roger Horton, later a justice of the Court of King's Bench, which suggests that he was held in high regard by the English Crown.

== Law Officer and judge ==
In 1394 he obtained the permission required for an alien to settle in England permanently, and he was exempted from any requirement to contribute to the defence of Ireland. He did return to Ireland as part of the entourage of King Richard II, on the King's visit to that Kingdom in the autumn of 1394. He was appointed Chief Baron of the Irish Exchequer in 1395, but he seems to have served in that office for only two years, before returning to England, where he remained for the rest of his life.

He acted regularly as a judge of assize and as a justice of the peace, and sat on numerous commissions for the peace, especially in Essex, where he became a major landowner, acquiring the manors of Writtle, Great Finborough and Stanford Rivers, which he and his son bought from John Chartesey in 1408. He had a London house in the parish of St Mary le Strand, where he also owned six shops. His health began to fail, and following a serious illness in 1414, he resigned as Serjeant, and ceased to sit as a judge of assize. He was alive in late 1419, but is thought to have died soon afterwards.

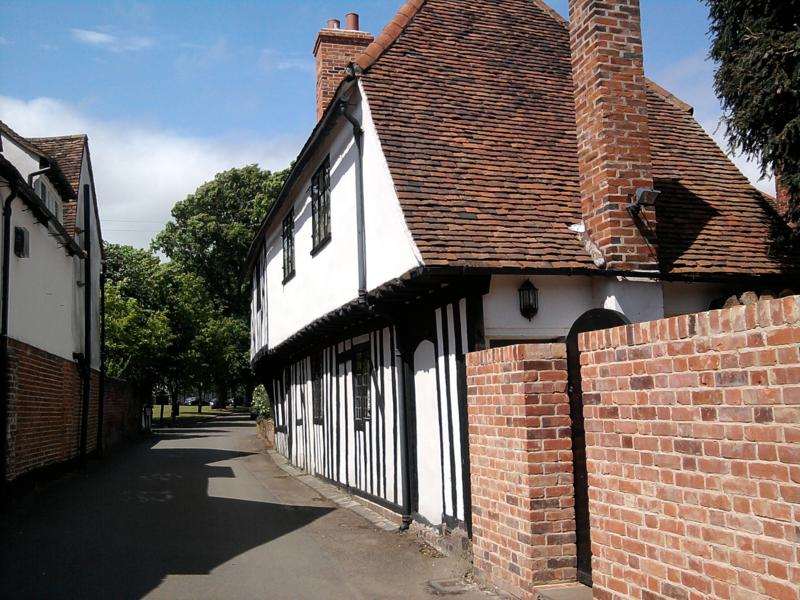
Half-timbered house in Writtle, Essex: Skrene was Lord of the Manor here.

== Descendants and inheritance claims ==
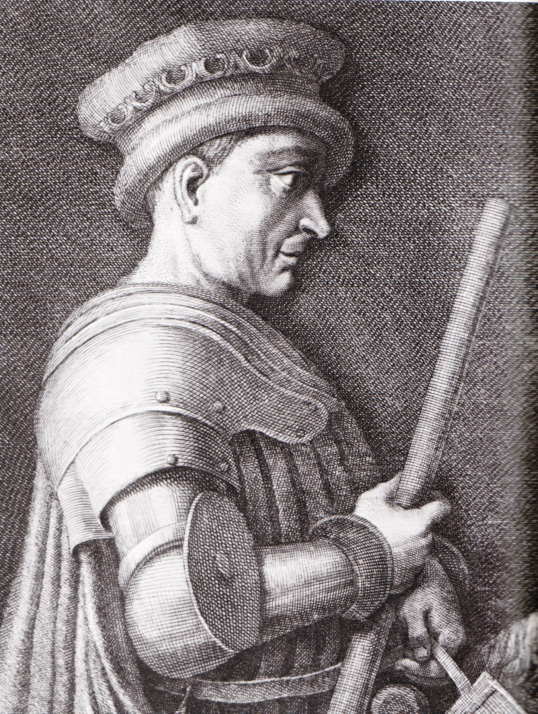
Sir John Hawkwood, the celebrated soldier of fortune: Skrene's son married his great-granddaughter Alice Tyrrell

He married Alice, daughter of Sir William Rykhill of Frindsbury and his wife Rose, and sister of William Rickhill MP and John Rickhill MP, and had four children: William, his heir, who died in 1431, Thomas, a third son who died young, and Margaret. The younger William married Alice Tyrrell, widow of Hamo Strange, and daughter of John Tyrrell, three times Speaker of the House of Commons of England and his first wife Alice Coggeshall, a granddaughter of the celebrated soldier of fortune Sir John Hawkwood.

Sir John Skrene (died 1475), the younger William's grandson, was the judge's last direct male heir. He was killed in a brawl, which he had apparently provoked, by his cousin Edward Tyrrell. His death resulted in Skrene's case, which was of some importance on the law of wardship; it involved a dispute over the inheritance of Sir John's grandmother, Alice Tyrrell (died 1460), widow of the younger William Skrene.

The ultimate beneficiaries from Sir John Skrene's death were the heirs of the elder William's sister Christina: these were her great-grandchildren John Clerk and Christina Colton. In the winter of 1476/7 they submitted a joint petition to the Irish Parliament asking to have their right to the Skrene lands recognised. As they were able to prove that their mothers were the daughters of Christina's only surviving daughter Margaret, the claim was successful, and an Act of Parliament was passed recognising their rights. A rival claim to the estate by Richard Ayston of Colchester, who claimed to be the son of another sister of William Skrene, Isabel Ayston, was unsuccessful.
