= Rickhill =

Rickhill is a surname. Notable people with the surname include:

- William Rickhill, English politician
- John Rickhill, MP

== See also ==
- Rick Hill
