= 1196 =

1196 in various calendars
- Gregorian calendar: 1196; MCXCVI
- Ab urbe condita: 1949
- Armenian calendar: 645; ԹՎ ՈԽԵ
- Assyrian calendar: 5946
- Balinese saka calendar: 1117–1118
- Bengali calendar: 602–603
- Berber calendar: 2146
- English Regnal year: 7 Ric. 1 – 8 Ric. 1
- Buddhist calendar: 1740
- Burmese calendar: 558
- Byzantine calendar: 6704–6705
- Chinese calendar: 乙卯年 (Wood Rabbit); 3893 or 3686 — to — 丙辰年 (Fire Dragon); 3894 or 3687
- Coptic calendar: 912–913
- Discordian calendar: 2362
- Ethiopian calendar: 1188–1189
- Hebrew calendar: 4956–4957
- Hindu calendars
- Vikram Samvat: 1252–1253
- Shaka Samvat: 1117–1118
- Kali Yuga: 4296–4297
- Holocene calendar: 11196
- Igbo calendar: 196–197
- Iranian calendar: 574–575
- Islamic calendar: 592–593
- Japanese calendar: Kenkyū 7 (建久７年)
- Javanese calendar: 1103–1104
- Julian calendar: 1196; MCXCVI
- Korean calendar: 3529
- Minguo calendar: 716 before ROC 民前716年
- Nanakshahi calendar: −272
- Seleucid era: 1507/1508 AG
- Thai solar calendar: 1738–1739
- Tibetan calendar: ཤིང་མོ་ཡོས་ལོ་ (female Wood-Hare); 1322 or 941 or 169 — to — མེ་ཕོ་འབྲུག་ལོ་ (male Fire-Dragon); 1323 or 942 or 170

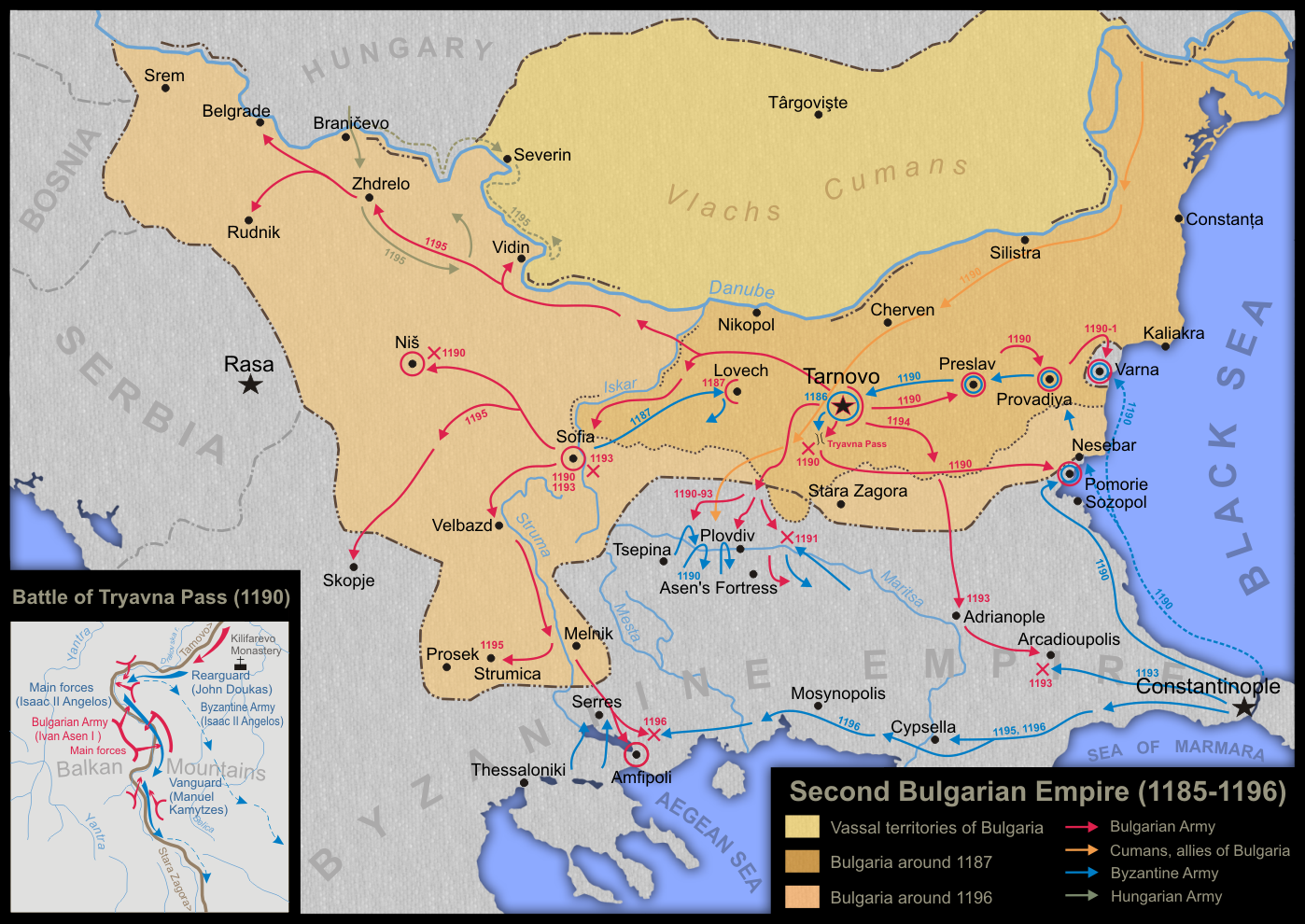
Second Bulgarian Empire (1185–1196)

Year 1196 (MCXCVI) was a leap year starting on Monday of the Julian calendar.

== Events ==
=== By place ===
==== Byzantine Empire ====
- December – Emperor Alexios III Angelos is threatened by Emperor Henry VI, Holy Roman Emperor, who demands 5,000 pounds of gold or the Byzantines will face an invasion, this due to a convoluted system of dynastic claims of Henry gaining control of Alexios' daughter Irene Doukaina. The amount is negotiated down to 1,600 pounds of gold – with Alexios plundering the imperial tombs within the Church of the Holy Apostles – as well as levying a heavy and unpopular tax, known as the Alamanikon (or German Tax).

==== Europe ====
- Spring – Henry VI persuades a diet at Würzburg. He manages to convince the majority of the German nobles and clergy to recognize his 2-year-old son, Frederick II, as king of the Romans and heir to the imperial throne. However, Archbishop Adolf of Cologne thwarts the will of the diet and arouses the resistance of several Saxon and Thuringian nobles against Henry, who realizes that he is unable to establish a hereditary monarchy (his Erbreichsplan) in the Holy Roman Empire without resistance.
- April 23 – Béla III of Hungary dies after a 23-year reign in which he has supported the former Byzantine emperor Isaac II Angelos against the invading Bulgarians. Having made the Hungarian court one of the most brilliant in Europe and made his hereditary monarchy. Béla is succeeded by his 22-year-old son Emeric as ruler of Hungary, Croatia and Dalmatia (until 1204).
- April 25 – King Alfonso II of Aragon ("the Chaste") dies after a 32-year reign at Perpignan. He leaves a will that divides his realm (Aragon loses Provence) and is succeeded by his 21-year-old son Peter II (the Catholic).
- Battle of Serres: Bulgarian forces under Tsar Ivan Asen I defeat the Byzantine army near Serres. During the winter Ivan continues his campaign in Central Macedonia and captures many Byzantine fortresses.
- Ivan Asen I is stabbed to death by Ivanko, a Bulgarian boyar (aristocrat), who is accused of having an affair with Ivan's wife's sister. He is succeeded by his brother Kaloyan as co-ruler of the Bulgarian Empire.

==== England ====
- Spring – William Fitz Osbert, a rebel leader, leads an uprising of the poor against the rich in London. He gathers over 52,000 supporters, stocks of weapons are cached throughout the city by breaking into the houses of the rich. Finally, the riots are suppressed and William is hanged, drawn and quartered by orders of Hubert Walter, archbishop of Canterbury.
- England is struck by pestilence and a resulting famine.

==== Asia ====
- Ch'oe Ch'ung-hŏn, a Korean general, massacres his rivals and restores unity. After a coup d'état, he takes full power and becomes prime-minister of the Korean state Goryeo (until 1219).

== Births ==
- January 3 – Tsuchimikado, emperor of Japan (d. 1231)
- March 27 – Sviatoslav III, Kievan Grand Prince (d. 1252)
- Abul Hasan ash-Shadhili, Almohad scholar (d. 1258)
- Alberico II, Italian troubadour and statesman (d. 1260)
- Aurembiaix, Spanish countess (House of Urgell) (d. 1231)
- Prince Dōjonyūdō, Japanese nobleman and waka poet (d. 1249)
- Henry II the Pious, High Duke of Poland (d. 1241)
- Henry VI, Count Palatine of the Rhine ("the Younger"), German nobleman (d. 1214)
- Pedro Alfonso de León, Spanish nobleman (d. 1226)
- William II of Dampierre, French nobleman (d. 1231)

== Deaths ==
- January 6 – Burchard du Puiset, Norman archdeacon
- April 23 – Béla III, king of Hungary and Croatia (b. 1148)
- April 25 – Alfonso II ("the Chaste"), king of Aragon (b. 1157)
- April 30 – Baldwin II van Holland, bishop of Utrecht
- July 12 – Maurice II de Craon, Norman nobleman
- August 14 – Henry IV ("the Blind"), count of Luxembourg
- August 15 – Conrad II, Duke of Swabia, German nobleman (b. 1172)
- September 11 – Maurice de Sully, bishop of Paris
- November 30 – Richard of Acerra, Norman nobleman
- Agnetha Ní Máelshechlainn, Irish abbess of Clonard
- Canute I (Eriksson), king of Sweden (approximate date)
- Dulcea of Worms, German Jewish businesswoman
- Ephraim of Bonn, German rabbi and writer (b. 1132)
- Eschiva of Ibelin, queen consort of Cyprus (b. 1160)
- Godfrey of Viterbo, Italian chronicler (approximate date)
- Hugh III of Rodez, French nobleman (House of Millau)
- Ibn Mada', Andalusian scholar and polymath (b. 1116)
- Isaac Komnenos Vatatzes, Byzantine aristocrat
- Ivan Asen I, ruler (tsar) of the Bulgarian Empire
- Jamal al-Din al-Ghaznawi, Arab jurist and theologian
- Roger fitzReinfrid, English sheriff and royal justice
- Taira no Kagekiyo, Japanese nobleman and samurai
- Vira Bahu I, ruler of the Kingdom of Polonnaruwa
- Vsevolod I Svyatoslavich ("the Fierce"), Kievan prince
- Wartislaw Swantibor ("the Younger"), Polish nobleman
- William Fitz Osbert, English politician and rebel leader
- William of Salisbury, English nobleman and high sheriff
- Yaish Ibn Yahya, Portuguese politician and advisor
