= Skryne =

Village in County Meath, Ireland

Skryne An Scrín
- Village
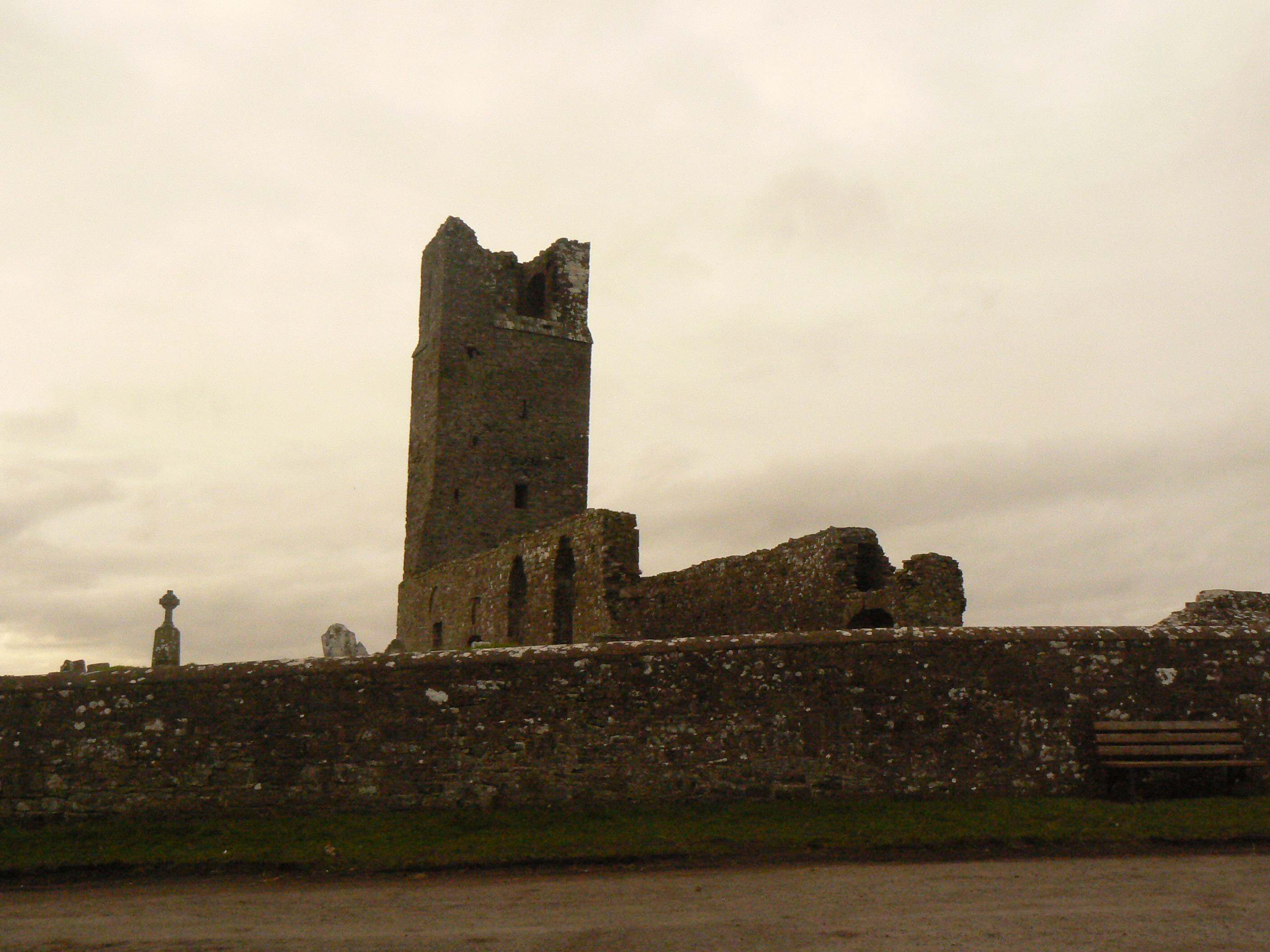
- Skryne tower, 15th-century church

- Location in Ireland
- Coordinates: 53.586°N 6.561°W
- Country: Ireland
- Province: Leinster
- County: County Meath
- Elevation: 135 m (443 ft)
- Irish Grid Reference: N949605

Skryne or Skreen (Irish: An Scrín from Irish Scrín Cholm Cille, meaning 'Colm Cille's shrine', or originally called The Hill of Acaill) is a village in County Meath, Ireland. On and around a hill between the N2 and N3 roads, it is 10 km south-east of the centre of Navan and 35 km north-west of the centre of Dublin. The village is on the far side of the Gabhra valley from the Hill of Tara (this valley is sometimes referred to as the Tara-Skryne Valley). The Hill of Skryne is higher than the neighbouring Hill of Tara. Skreen gives its name to the surrounding barony, civil parish and townland.

About 1170 Hugh de Lacy, Lord of Meath granted Skryne to Adam de Feypo, whose descendants used the customary title Baron Skryne, which was not a peerage in the strict sense. A 15th-century church, known locally as Skryne tower or The Steeple, remains in good condition at the top of the hill and is visible from a large area of Meath. At the foot of the tower is a pub and stables that feature in the Guinness "white Christmas" television advertisement.

== Sport ==
The local Gaelic football club, Skryne GFC, is one of the most successful in Meath Senior Football Championship history and have never been relegated from senior level in the Keegan Cup. The club also has had at least one player on every Meath team that has won the All-Ireland Senior Football Championship. They have been county champions on thirteen occasions, most recently in 2010, when they defeated Seneschalstown in the final, coming back four times from Seneschalstown goals to win by 0–21 to 4–8.

== Notable people ==
- Matthew Corbally (1797–1870), leading politician and MP for County Meath; he and his wife are buried in the vault of Skryne church.
- Agnetha Ní Máelshechlainn was Abbess of the St Mary's Augustinian Abbey, Clonard during the Anglo-Norman invasion of Ireland and ensured the church remained in church hands when Skryne was granted to Adam de Feypo.
- William Skrene (died 1421), Chief Baron of the Irish Exchequer 1395–7, came from a family which derived its name from Skryne, though they later lived in Dundalk.

== Gallery ==
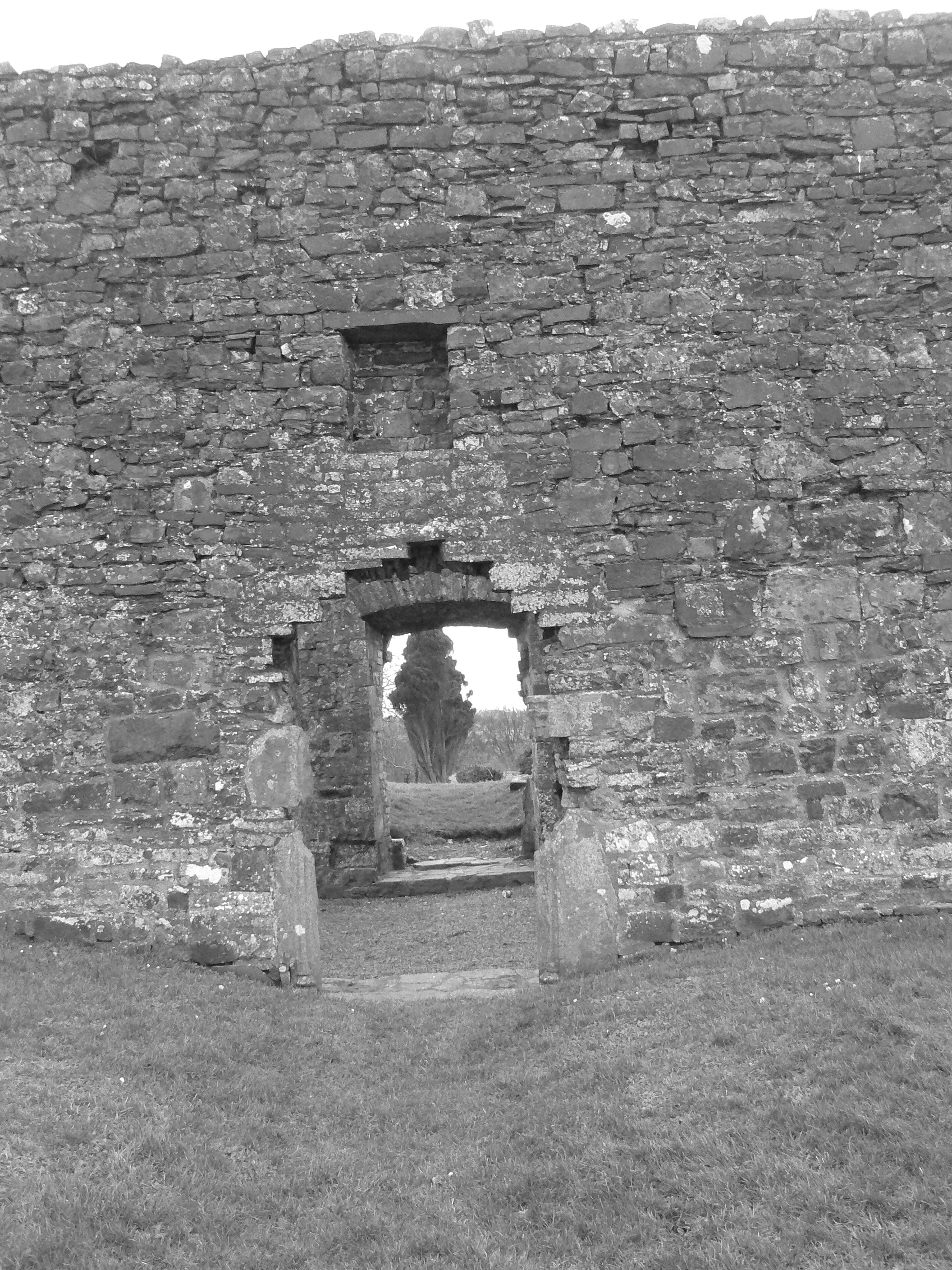
Southern view of Skryne church

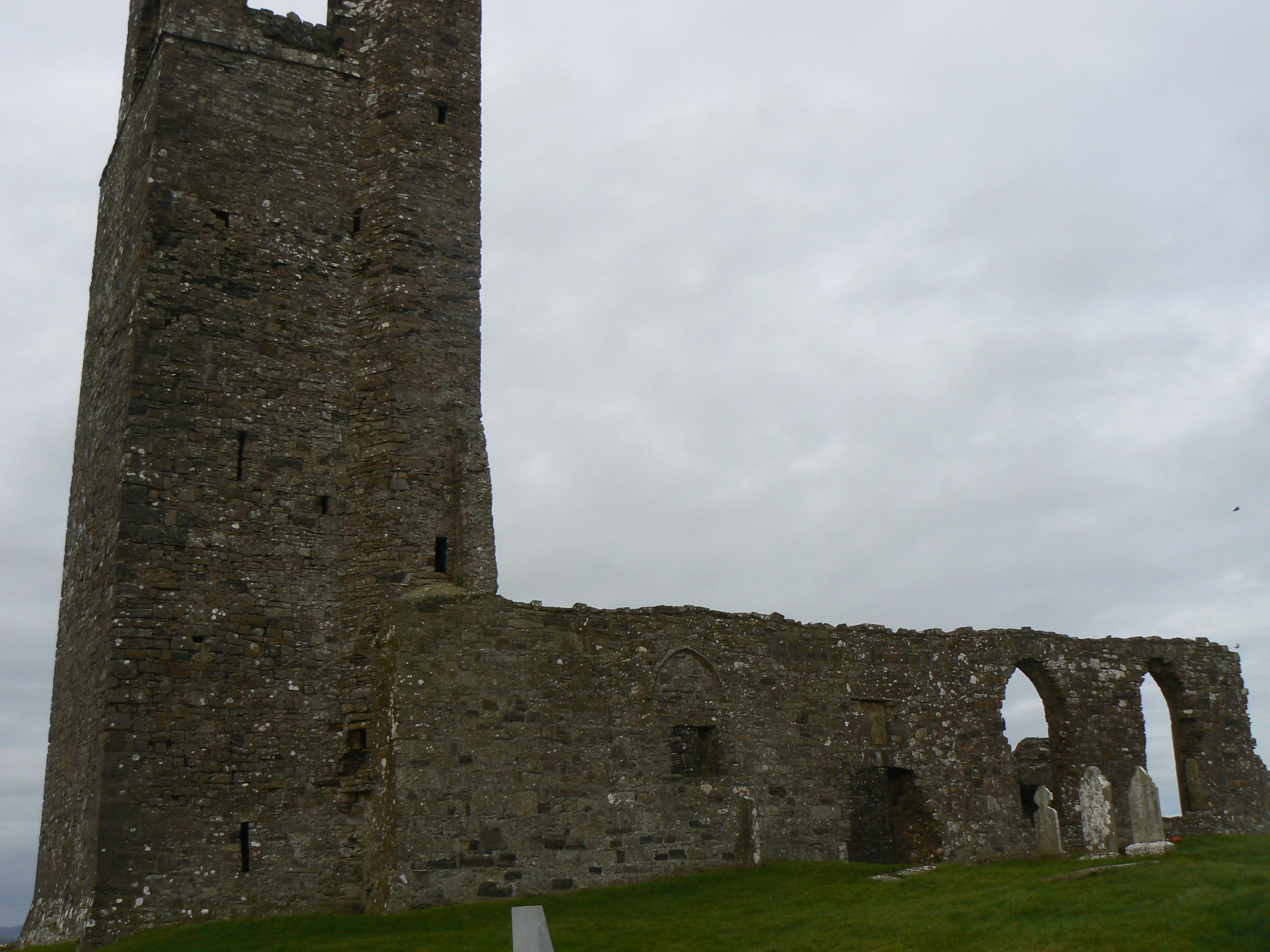
Northeastern view of Skryne church

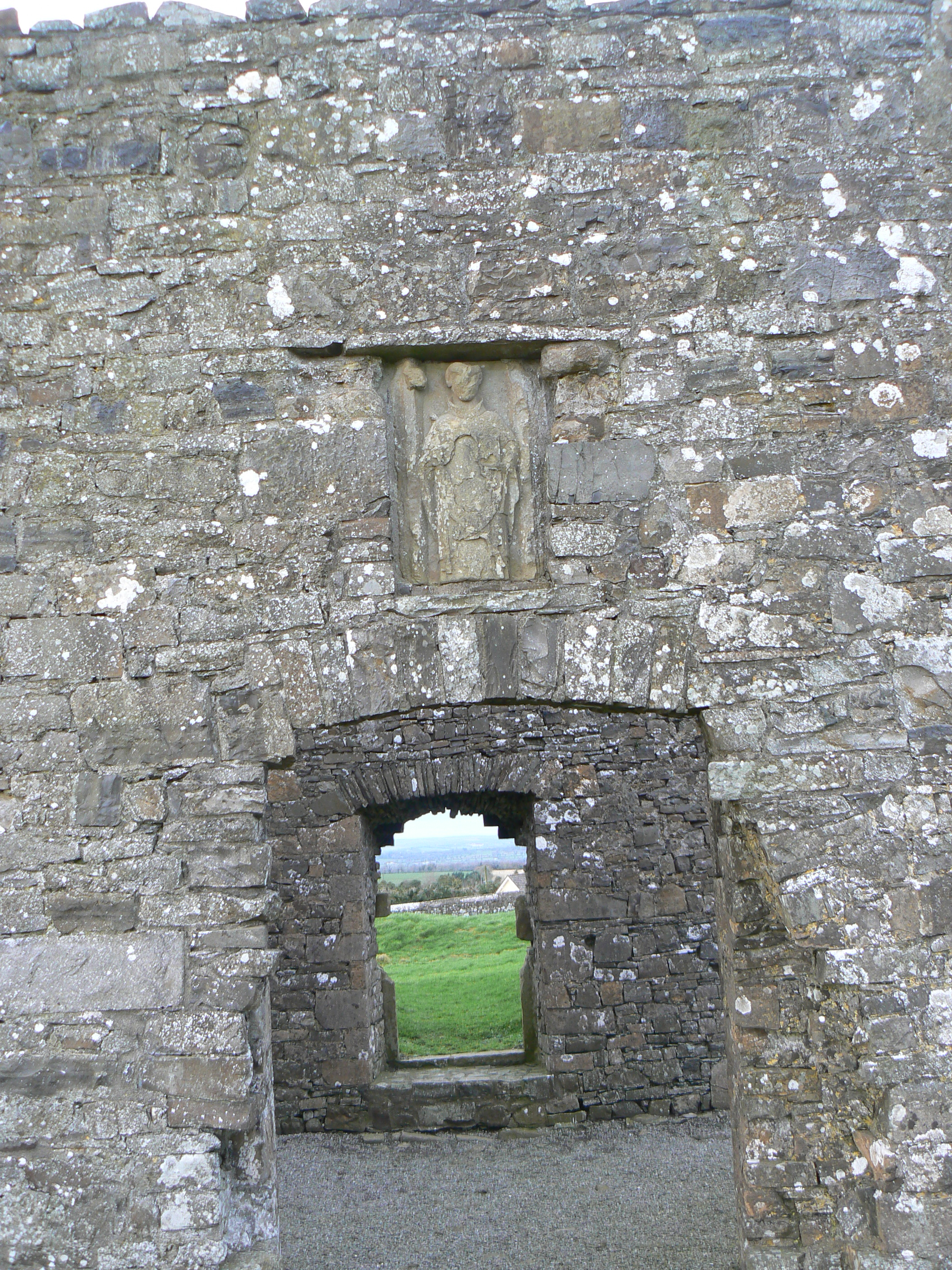
Carved effigy of Saint Colmcille

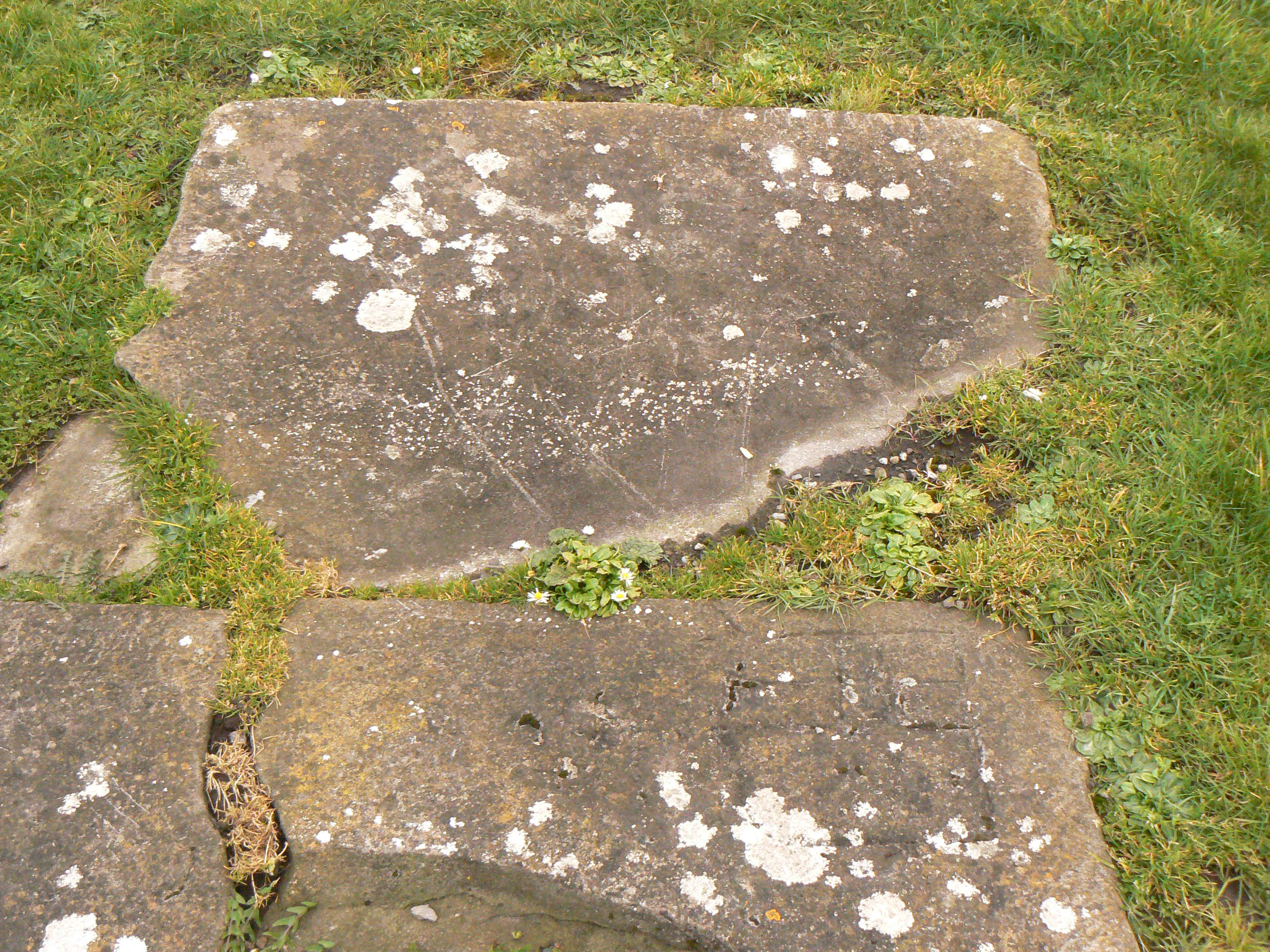
Medieval grave stones

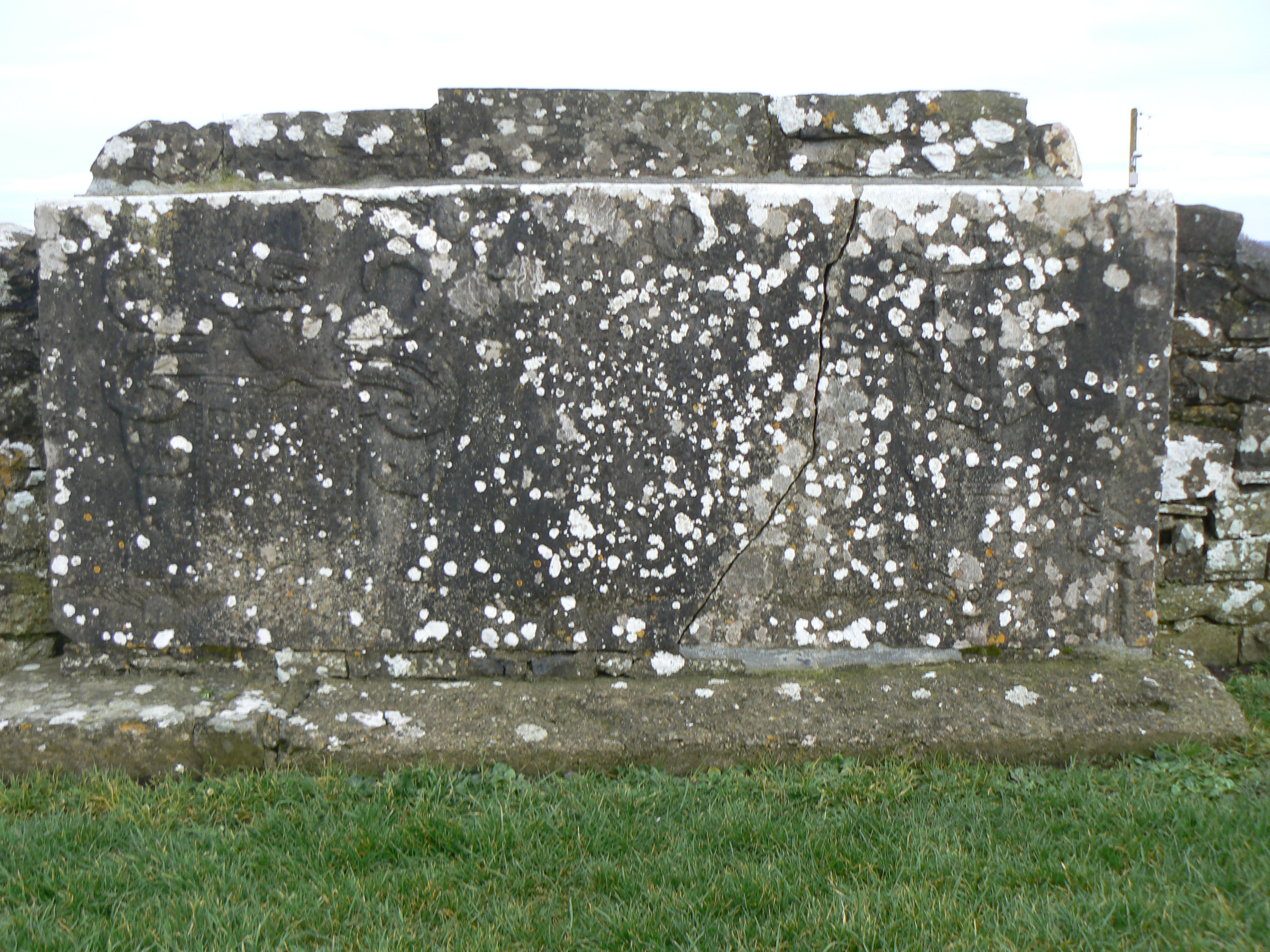
Sixteenth-century tombstone of the Marward family, barons of Skreen

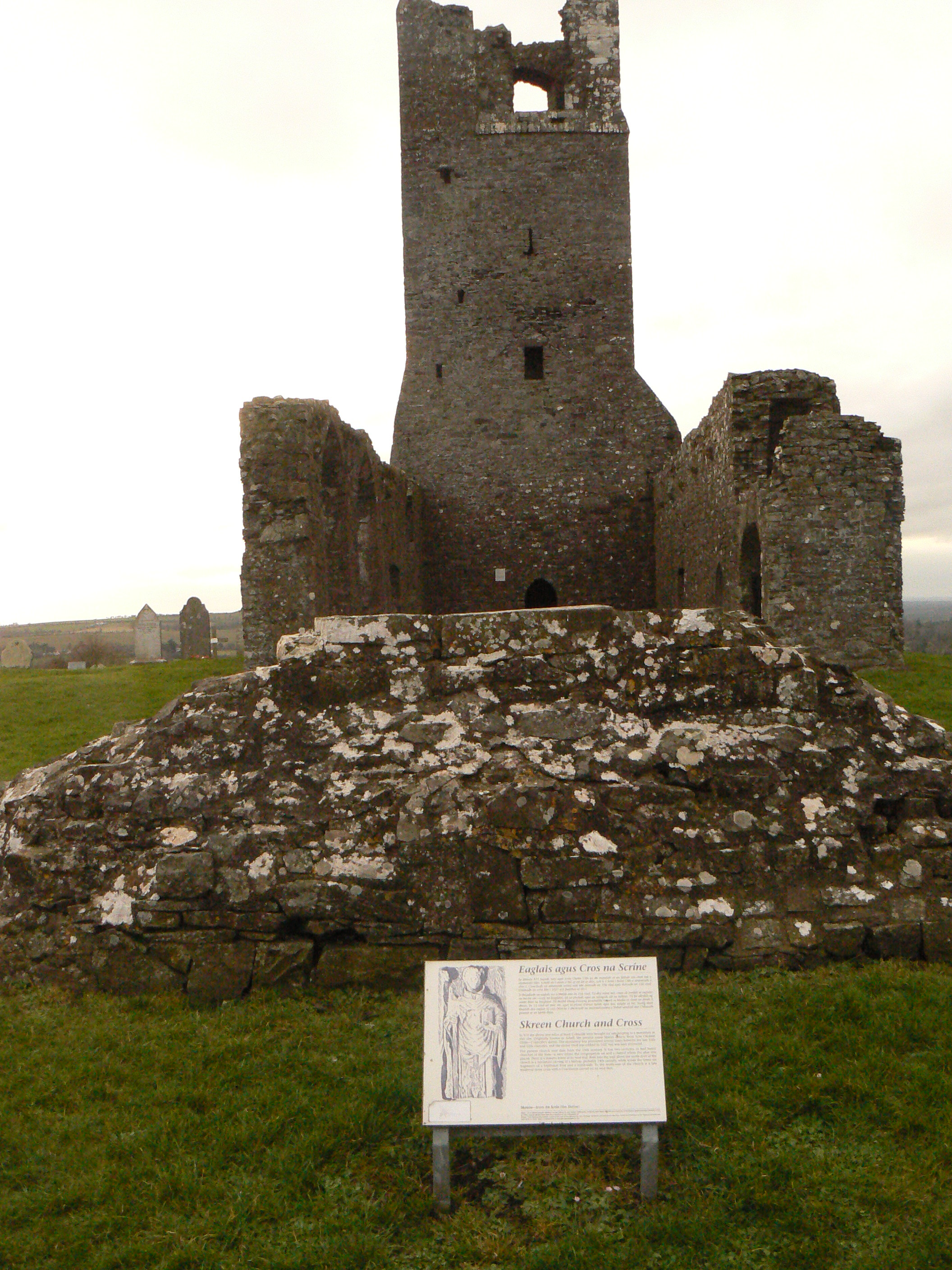
Northwestern view of the church

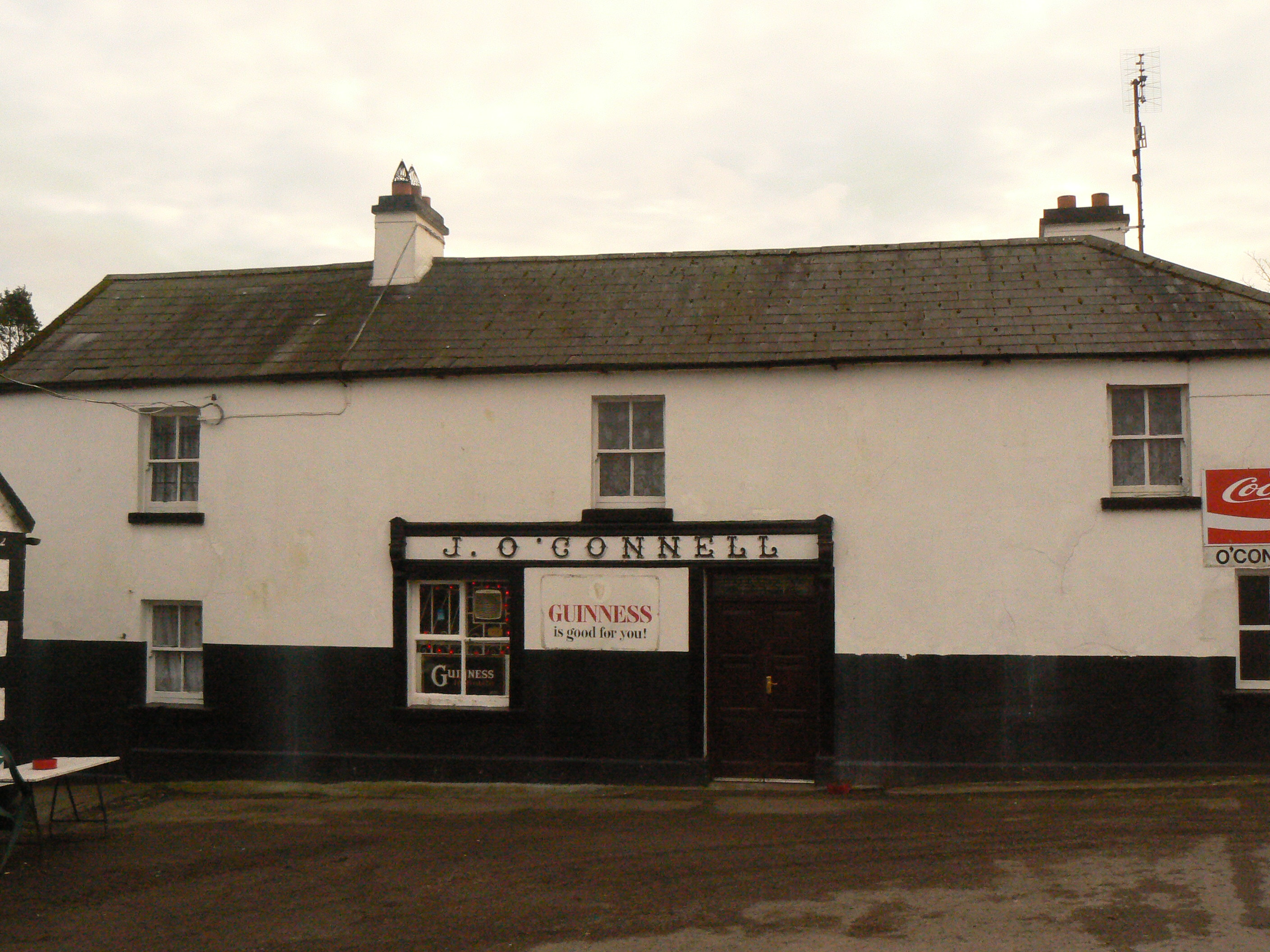
O'Connell's pub, used in Guinness white Christmas ads

== See also ==
- List of towns and villages in Ireland
