= Agnetha Ní Máelshechlainn =

Abbess of St Mary's, Clonard

- Born: Ireland
- Died: 1196
- Other names: An Caillech Mór - The Great Nun

Agnetha Ní Máelshechlainn ( – 1196), was Abbess of the St Mary's Augustinian Abbey, Clonard during the Anglo-Norman invasion of Ireland. She was known as An Caillech Mór - The Great Nun.

== Family background ==
Agnetha Ní Máelshechlainn was the daughter of Muirchertach mac Domnaill Ua Mael Sechlainn, a King of Mide from 1105 to 1106 and his wife Dubchoblaig. Her paternal family were from the Clann Cholmáin and her paternal uncle Murchad Ua Máelshechlainn deposed her father. Her maternal grandfather was Donnchad mac Murchada, from the Uí Ceinnselaig, king of Leinster.

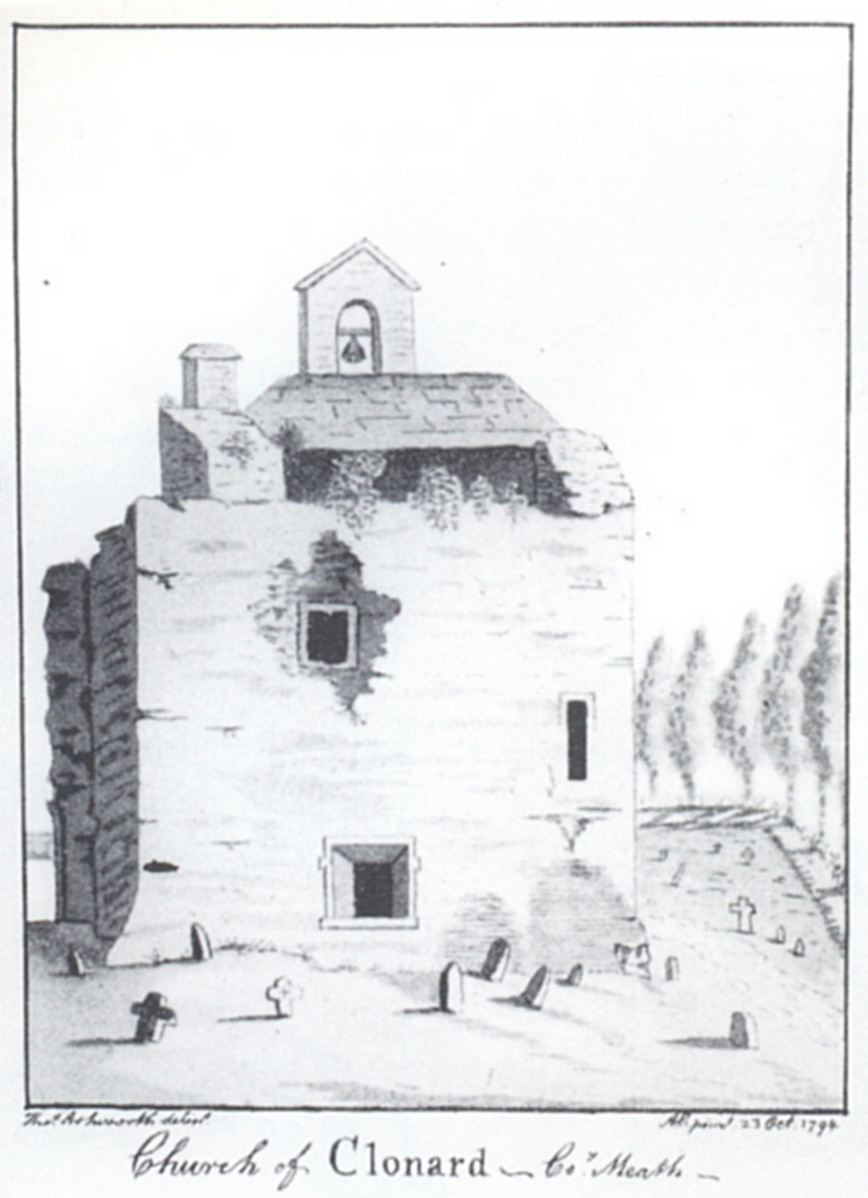
Clonard Abbey Ruins Austin Cooper 1794

Ní Máelshechlainn had several siblings from her parents' other marriages. Donnchad, her paternal half-brother was appointed king of Mide in 1144. Her cousins Domnall Bregach (d. 1173) and Art (d. 1184) were also kings of Mide during her lifetime.

Her uncle, Conchobar Ua Máelshechlainn, was the Abbot of Clonard and a cousin Derbfhorgaill founded a religious house at Clonmacnoise.

== Religious life ==
Ní Máelshechlainn entered the convent, probably while her uncle was there. By 1175 she was Abbess of St Mary's, the Augustinian head house in Ireland.

She defended the property during the Anglo-Norman invasion of the kingdom. When the Anglo-Norman Adam de Feypo was allocating the lands she demanded that the Church of St Mary near Skryne and its holdings remain the property of the nuns. She persuaded Pope Celestine III to back up her position with a letter dated 26 February 1196. The letter also included the order's religious houses at Lusk, Termonfeckin and Clonmacnoise.

Agnetha Ní Máelshechlainn was in her sixties or seventies when she died, not long after gaining the protection of the pope's letter. Ní Máelshechlainn was known as An Caillech Mór or The Great Nun.

== See also ==
- M. C. Dobbs, ‘The Ban-Shenchus’, Rev. Celt
- Sheehy, Pontificia Hib., i, 83–6, §29
- Gwynn & Hadcock, Med. relig. houses, 314
- John Brady, ‘The nunnery of Clonard’, Ríocht na Mídhe, ii, no. 2 (1960), 4
- N. Hadcock, ‘The origin of the Augustine order in Meath’, Ríocht na Mídhe, iii, no. 2 (1964), 124
- E. Hickey, Skryne and the early Normans (1994), 77
