= William Rickhill =

English politician

William Rickhill (before 1385 – after 1447), of Ifield, Kent, was an English politician.

== Family ==
Rickhill was the eldest son of Sir William Rickhill (died 1407), of Ifield and Islingham in Frindsbury and his wife Rose (died 1418). Rose was close to William and left him her personal property. He was the elder brother of John Rickhill, MP (died 1432), Nicholas and Alice, who married William Skrene, Chief Baron of the Irish Exchequer. Nicholas married a wealthy widow, but at his death in 1432 was entangled in numerous lawsuits, which William had the task of fighting or setting.

William Rickhill married, before February 1421, Katherine Coventry, daughter of William Coventry, a London merchant. They had one daughter, and Katherine died on 27 August 1433. Their daughter married Edward Lymsey and had a son John, who was his grandfather's heir.

== Career ==
He fought well at the Battle of Agincourt, and took three French prisoners, who he held to ransom. He apparently took no further part in the war. In 1420, Rickhill was a Member of Parliament for Kent.
