= Skryne Church =

- Skreen Church; Skryne Tower; The Steeple
- Scrín Choluim Chille
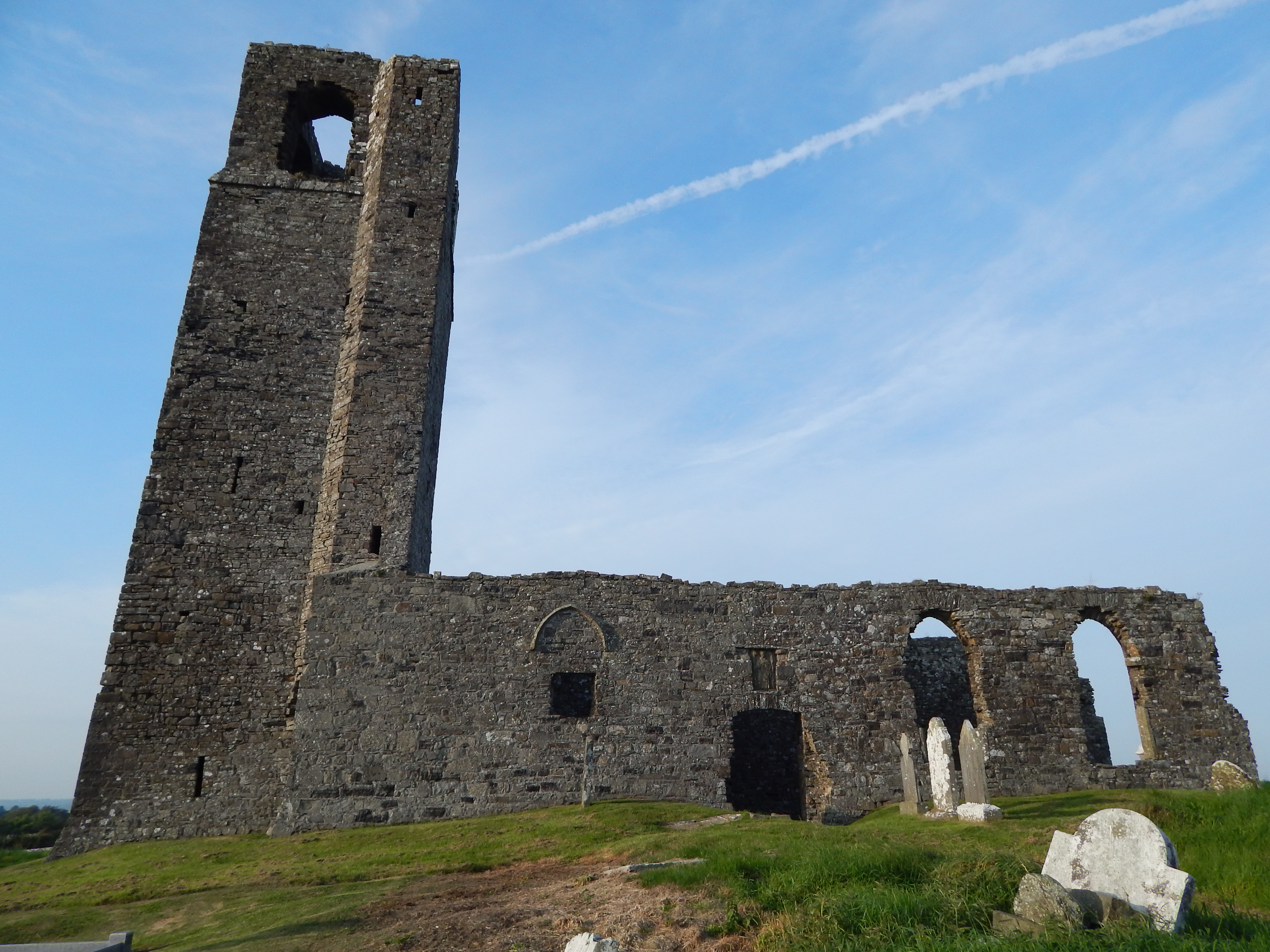

- Location within Ireland
- 53.585946°N 6.563023°W
- Location: Hill of Skryne, Skryne, County Meath
- Country: Ireland
- Denomination: Church of Ireland
- Previous denomination: Pre-Reformation Catholic

History
- Founder(s): Francis de Feypo, Baron Skryne
- Dedication: St. Lawrence O'Toole

Architecture
- Years built: 1341

Specifications
- Length: 36.3 m (119 ft)
- Width: 6.47 m (21.2 ft)
- Height: 30 m (98 ft)

Administration
- Diocese: Meath
Designations
National monument of Ireland
- Official name: Skryne Church
- Reference no.: 109

Skryne Church is a ruined medieval church and National Monument in County Meath, Ireland.

== Location ==
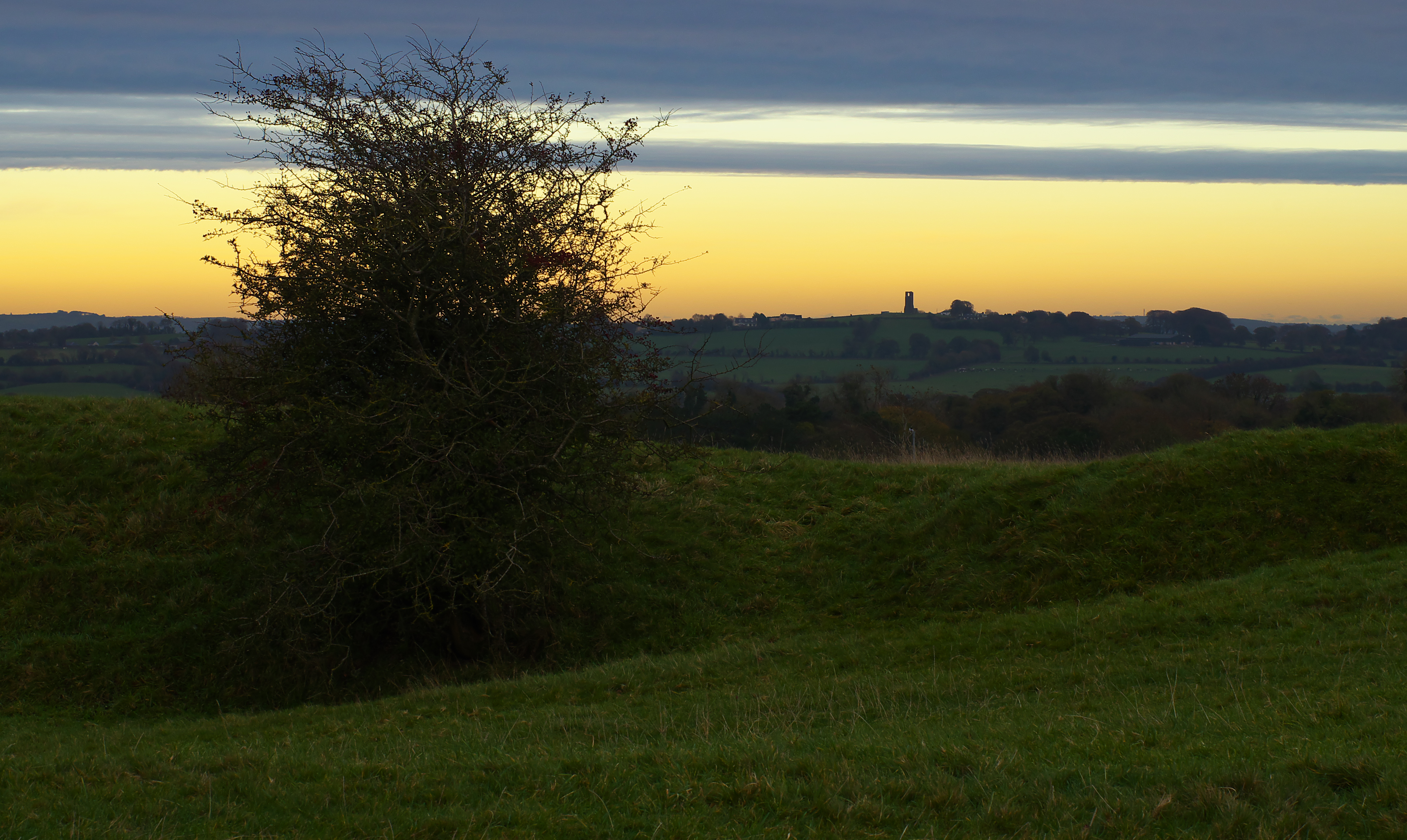
Skryne Church viewed at sunset from the Hill of Tara.

Skryne Church is located atop the Hill of Skryne, 1.4 km (0.87 mi) northwest of Skryne village, 3.2 km (2.0 mi) east of the Hill of Tara. It's located beside the famous Mrs O'Connell pub which featured in the Guinness Christmas advertisement.

== History ==
A monastery named Achall (after the legendary Achall) was on this site at an earlier date. The shrine of Columba (Colm Cille) or maybe some of his relics, was brought here in the 10th century for safe keeping, so it acquired the name Scrín Choluim Chille (Colmcille's Shrine; from Latin scrīnium). The monastery was plundered at least six times by various raiders, but it continued to run even after the Norman conquest of Ireland. Adam de Feypo, first Baron Skryne, founded a church dedicated to Nicholas of Myra and endowed it upon his brother Thomas, who joined the Cistercians of St. Mary's Abbey, Dublin. St Mary's held Skryne up until the Dissolution of the Monasteries in 1534.

Skryne Church was built in 1341 as a house of Augustinians by Francis de Feypo, the last de Feypo Baron Skryne. The tower was added in the 15th century.

== Church ==
The church is a nave and chancel with mural stairs to a rood screen and an arched tomb recess. A carving of a man is near the door, possibly Colm Cille. The bell tower is three storeys high and has a base-batter. It contains fragments of a baptismal font and a tomb slab. A medieval cross stands nearby.

== Gallery ==
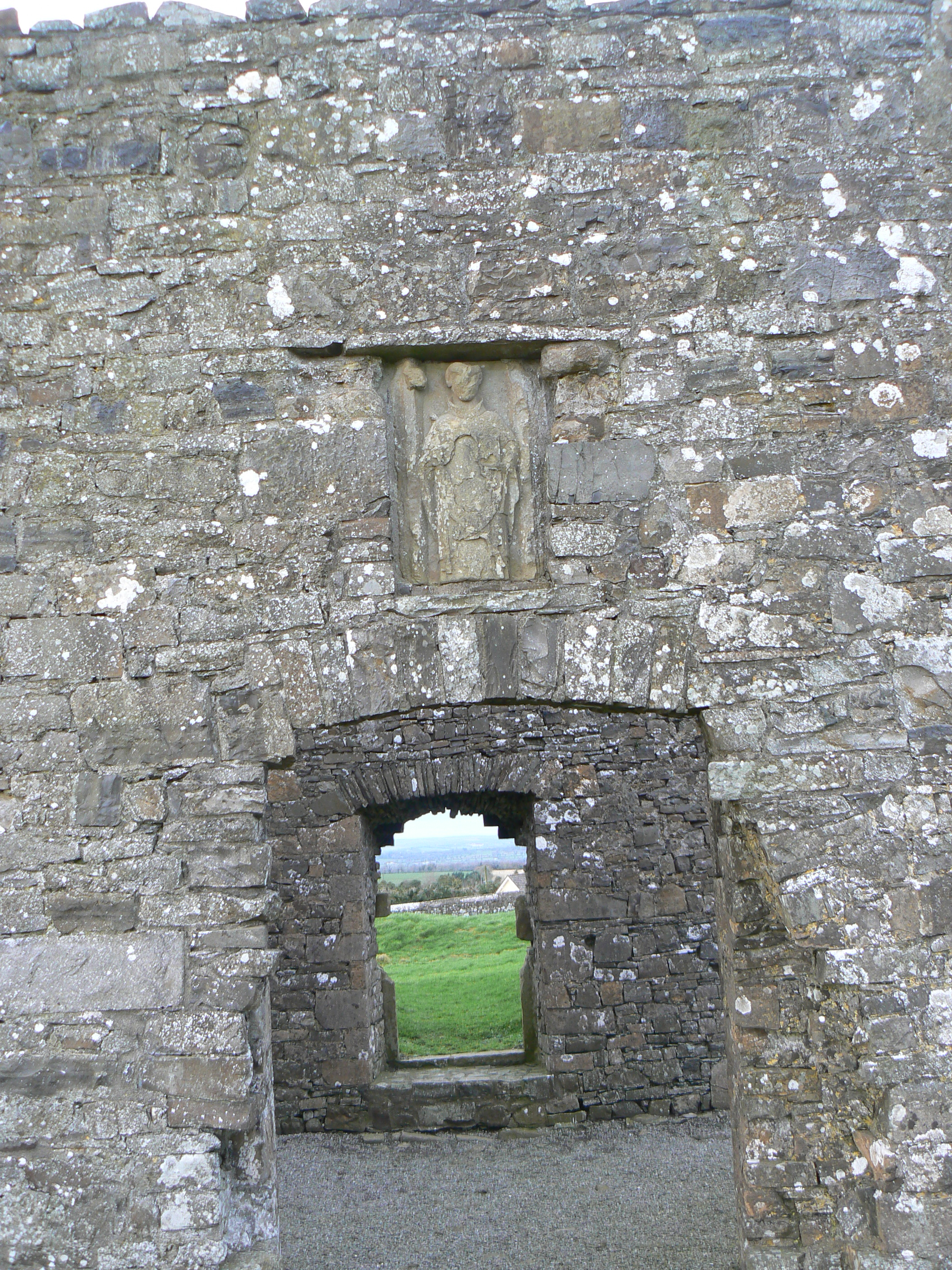
Doorway with carved figure of saint above

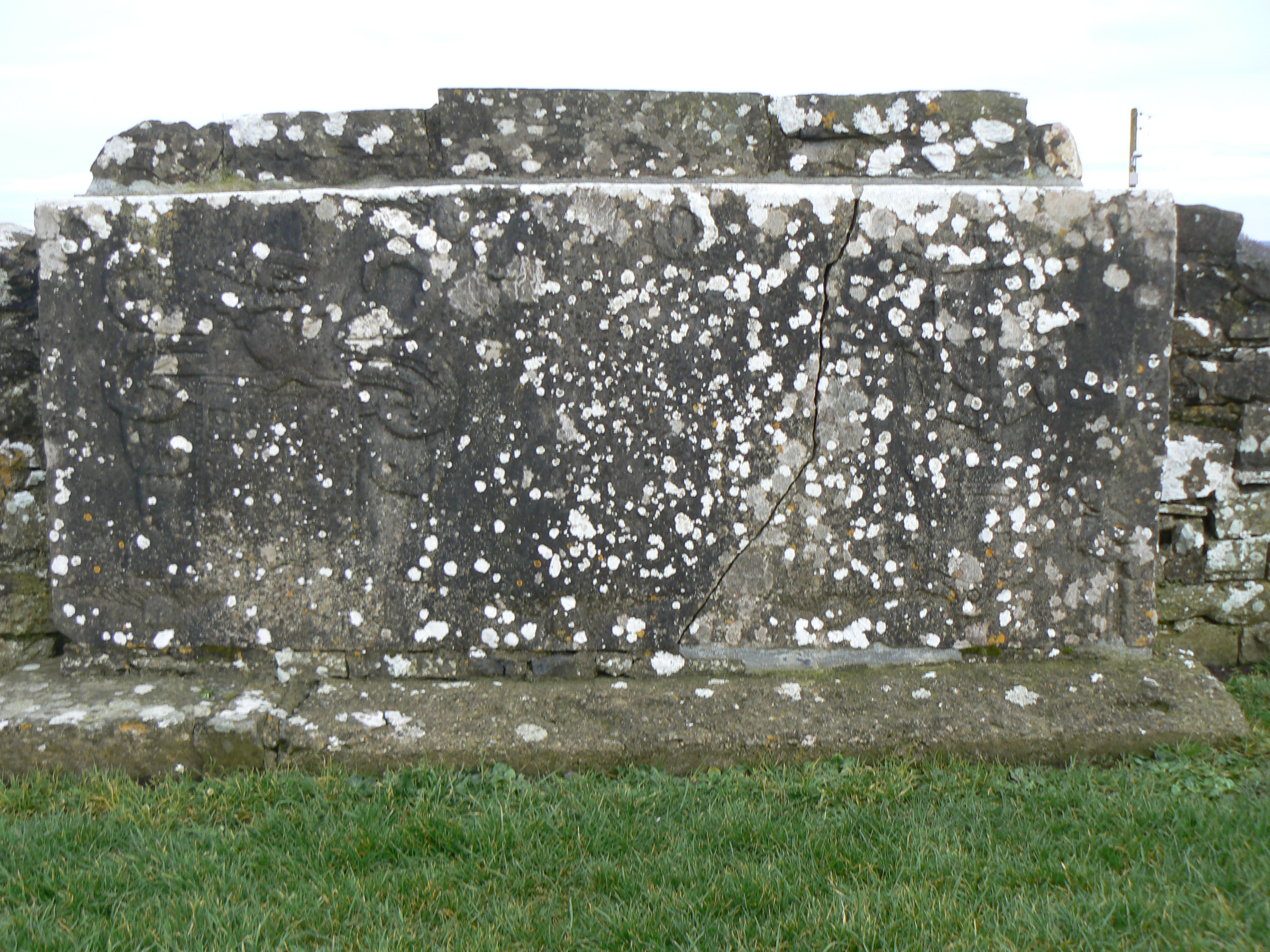
The Marward Stone, 16th-century burial site of the Barons Skryne
