= 2026 Meath Senior Football Championship =

Gaelic football tournament

134th Meath Senior Football Championship

Tournament details
- County: Meath
- Province: Leinster
- Year: 2026
- Trophy: Keegan Cup
- Sponsor: Fairyhouse Steel
- Date: 6 August 2026 – 18 October 2026
- Teams: 16
- Defending champions: Summerhill

Winners
- Champions: Wolfe Tones (3rd win)
- Manager: Shane McCoy
- Captain: Shane Glynn & Oisín Martin

Runners-up
- Runners-up: Donaghmore/Ashbourne
- Manager: Timmy O'Regan
- Captain: Evan Quinn

Promotion/Relegation
- Relegated team(s): Simonstown Gaels

Other
- Matches played: 34
- Website: Meath GAA

The 2026 Meath Senior Football Championship is the 134th edition of the Meath GAA's premier club Gaelic football tournament for senior clubs in County Meath, with 16 teams competing. The winner will represent Meath in the Leinster Senior Club Football Championship. The championship will start with a group stage and then progress to a knock-out stage.

Summerhill are the defending champions after defeating Ratoath 0–16 to 0–13 in the final to win their 9th Keegan Cup and their 2nd in the space of 3 years.

Kilbride won the 2025 Meath Intermediate Football Championship by beating Castletown 0–20 to 1–16 in the final, gaining them senior status for the first time since 1978. Meath Hill replaces them in the 2026 Meath I.F.C after losing the Relegation final to St Colmcille's.

The draw for the group stage was conducted on 19 January 2026, and the fixtures for those group stage games were finalised on 18 June 2026.

Simonstown Gaels were relegated from the Meath Senior Football Championship after losing to Na Fianna in the relegation playoff. It meant Simonstown Gaels would be playing in the Meath IFC for the first time since 1995.

On 18 October 2026, Wolfe Tones won their 3rd championship title by beating Donaghmore/Ashbourne 1-19 to 0-12. It was Wolfe Tones first championship since 2021.

== Championship Structure ==
The 2026 Meath S.F.C consists of 16 teams openly drawn into four groups each containing four teams. The top two teams progress to the quarter-finals, while the bottom team in each group contests the Relegation Semi-finals. The loser of the semi-finals will play-off against one another for the right to retain their senior status into 2027.

== Team Changes ==
The following teams have changed division since the 2025 championship season:

=== To S.F.C. ===
Promoted from 2025 I.F.C.

- Kilbride - (Intermediate Champions)

=== From S.F.C. ===
Relegated to 2026 I.F.C.

- Meath Hill

== Participating teams ==
The teams participating in the 2026 Meath S.F.C are:

Club	Location	Manager(s)	Pre C'ship Odds	League	2025 Championship Position	2026 Championship Position	In championship since	Championship Titles (Pre 2026)	Last Championship Title (Pre 2026)
Ballinabrackey	Ballinabrackey	Ciarán Giblin	80/1	Division 2	Quarter-Finalist	Non-Qualifier	2021	0	—
Donaghmore/Ashbourne	Ashbourne	Timmy O'Regan	20/1	Division 1	Quarter-Finalist	Runners-Up	2008	3	1942
Dunshaughlin	Dunshaughlin & Drumree	Richie Kealy	6/1	Division 1	Semi-Finalist	Quarter-Finalist	2023	4	2024
Gaeil Colmcille	Kells	Conn Cleary	18/1	Division 1	Relegation Semi-Finalist	Non-Qualifier	2014	3	1991
Kilbride	Kilbride	Anthony Moyles	80/1	Division 3	I.F.C Champions	Relegation Semi-Finalist	2026	5	1971
Na Fianna	Enfield & Baconstown	Johnny Baldwin	50/1	Division 1	Non-Qualifier	Relegation Finalist	2013	0	—
Rathkenny	Rathkenny	Joey Farrelly	50/1	Division 2	Non-Qualifier	Quarter-Finalist	2024	5	1923
Ratoath	Ratoath	Kevin Daly	9/4	Division 1	Runners-Up	Semi-Finalist	2016	3	2022
Seneschalstown	Kentstown & Yellow Furze	David Hosie	25/1	Division 2	Non-Qualifier	Relegation Semi-Finalist	1968	4	2009
Simonstown Gaels	Navan	Tony Dunne	50/1	Division 2	Relegation Semi-Finalist	Relegated to Intermediate	1996	2	2017
Skryne	Skryne & Tara	Aidan Tuite	33/1	Division 1	Semi-Finalist	Non-Qualifier	1938	13	2010
St Colmcille's	Bettystown, Donacarney, Laytown & Mornington	Mickey Conlon	25/1	Division 1	Relegation Finalist	Quarter-Finalist	2017	0	—
St Peter's Dunboyne	Dunboyne	David Gallagher	16/1	Division 1	Non-Qualifier	Non-Qualifier	1993	3	2018
Summerhill	Summerhill	Dave Clare	3/1	Division 1	Champions	Semi-Finalist	1972	9	2025
Trim	Trim	Ken Robinson	20/1	Division 1	Quarter-Finalist	Quarter-Finalist	2022	1	1962
Wolfe Tones	Kilberry, Gibbstown, Oristown & Wilkinstown	Shane McCoy	13/2	Division 1	Quarter-Finalist	Champions	2005	2	2021

== Group Stage ==
There are four groups each containing four teams, each of these groups being named Group A, B, C and D. The top two teams qualify for the quarter-finals, while the bottom placed teams in each group proceed to a relegation play-off to determine who will be relegated.

The draw for the group stage was conducted on 19 January 2026, and the fixtures for those group games were finalised on 18 June 2026.

=== Group A ===
Advance to knockout stage Advance to relegation play-off

Team	Matches				Score			Pts
Team	Pld	W	D	L	For	Against	Diff	Pts
Summerhill	3	3	0	0	72	45	+27	6
Rathkenny	3	1	1	1	60	46	+14	3
St. Peter's Dunboyne	3	1	1	1	55	61	-6	3
Kilbride	3	0	0	3	29	64	-35	0

==== Round 1 ====
6 August 2026 Round 1	Summerhill	1-14 (17) – (11) 1-08	Kilbride	Dunganny
19:30 IST (UTC+1)		(HT: 0-05 – 1-07)
	Pts: Liam Shaw 0-5, Conor Frayne 1-1, Barry Dardis 0-2, Seán Muddioman 0-2, David Larkin 0-1, Eoghan Frayne 0-1, Padraig Geraghty 0-1	Report	Pts: David O'Leary 0-5, Josh Hartford 1-0, James Gavin 0-1, Adam Malone 0-1	Referee: Andrew Smith (Dunshaughlin)

6 August 2026 Round 1	Rathkenny	1-14 (17) – (17) 1-14	St Peter's Dunboyne	Dunsany
19:30 IST (UTC+1)		(HT: 1-06 – 1-04)
	Pts: Keith Curtis 0-8 (3tpf), Luke Kealy 1-0, Joey Curtis 0-2, Donal Keogan 0-1, Ciarán O'Hare 0-1, Robert Garry 0-1, Cummins Fuller 0-1	Report	Pts: Charlie Gallagher 0-7 (1f, 2tpf, 1tp), Seán Delaney 0-5 (2tp), Mark Furlong 1-0, Ciarán McCormack 0-1, John Harkin 0-1	Referee: Patrick Coyle (Curraha)

==== Round 2 ====
20 August 2026 Round 2	Kilbride	1-04 (7) – (26) 1-23	Rathkenny	Duleek
19:30 IST (UTC+1)		(HT: 0-01 – 1-10)
	Pts: David O'Leary 1-1 (1f), Luke Faherty 0-2 (1f, 1'45), Josh Harford 0-1 (f)	Report	Pts: Keith Curtis 0-9 (5f, 1tpf, 1'45), Luke Kealy 0-6, Ciarán O'Hare 1-2, Joey Curtis 0-3, Christy Meade 0-1, Corbin Jenkinson 0-1, Davy Curtis 0-1	Referee: Robert Purfield (St Patrick's)

23 August 2026 Round 2	St Peter's Dunboyne	1-14 (17) – (33) 3-24	Summerhill	Dunganny
14:00 IST (UTC+1)

==== Round 3 ====
6 September 2026 Round 3	St Peter's Dunboyne	2-15 (21) – (11) 0-11	Kilbride	Ashbourne
14:00 IST (UTC+1)		(HT: 1-10 – 0-02)
	Pts: Donal Lenihan 1-8 (3f, 1tp), Charlie Gallagher 1-1 (1-0f), John Harkin 0-4 (1'45), Eoghan McDonald 0-2	Report	Pts: David O'Leary 0-6 (2tpf, 1f), Josh Harford 0-2 (tpf), Andrew McWeeney 0-1, Fiachra Coffey 0-1, Warren Rogers 0-1	Referee: Andrew Smith (Dunshaughlin)

6 September 2026 Round 3	Summerhill	1-19 (22) – (17) 1-14	Rathkenny	Dunganny
14:00 IST (UTC+1)		(HT: 0-04 – 1-12)
	Pts: Conor Frayne 1-4 (1tp), Eoghan Frayne 0-4 (1f, 1tpf), Adam McDonnell 0-4 (2tp), Padhraig Geraghty 0-2, Diarmuid McCabe 0-2, David Larkin 0-2, Liam Shaw 0-1 (f)	Report	Pts: Luke Kealy 1-0, James O'Hare 0-3, Joey Curtis 0-3 (1tp), Davy Curtis 0-3 (1tp), Keith Curtis 0-3 (1f, 1tpf), Donal Keogan 0-1, Ciarán O'Hare 0-1	Referee: Cormac Reilly (St Mary's)

=== Group B ===
Advance to knockout stage Advance to relegation play-off

Team	Matches				Score			Pts
Team	Pld	W	D	L	For	Against	Diff	Pts
Ratoath	3	3	0	0	71	35	+36	6
Trim	3	2	0	1	48	52	-4	4
Skryne	3	1	0	2	51	66	-15	2
Na Fianna	3	0	0	3	42	59	-17	0

==== Round 1 ====
7 August 2026 Round 1	Ratoath	4-17 (29) – (13) 0-13	Skryne	Dunshaughlin
19:30 IST (UTC+1)		(HT: 2-10 – 0-07)
	Pts: Daithí McGowan 1-4 (1f), Bryan McMahon 2-0, Joey Wallace 1-0, Glen O'Reilly 0-3 (1tp), Adam Ducie 0-3 (1f), Cian Rogers 0-2, Oisín Kelly 0-2, Liam Kelly 0-1, Gavin McGowan 0-1, Eamon Wallace 0-1	Report	Pts: Darragh Campion 0-5 (2f, 1tp), Seán Smyth 0-2, Billy Smyth 0-2, Ian Davis 0-2 (tp), Shane Smyth 0-1, Pádraig Finnerty 0-1	Referee: Kieran Olwell (Moynalty)

8 August 2026 Round 1	Na Fianna	0-12 (12) – (19) 0-19	Trim	Summerhill
18:00 IST (UTC+1)		(HT: 0-05 – 0-09)
	Pts: Daniel Queeney 0-5 (1tpf, 1tp, 1f), Ethan Devine 0-3 (1tp), Shane Jordan 0-2 (tp), Luke Kelly 0-1, Conor Downey 0-1	Report	Pts: Aaron Lynch 0-12 (3tpf, 1f, 1tp, 1'45), Tom Carmody 0-4 (1tp), Ciarán Caulfield 0-2, Eoin O'Connor 0-1	Referee: David Gough (Slane)

==== Round 2 ====
21 August 2026 Round 2	Trim	0-10 (10) – (24) 3-15	Ratoath	Dunganny
19:30 IST (UTC+1)		(HT: 0-07 – 1-07)
	Pts: Tom Carmody 0-4 (1tp), Aaron Lynch 0-4 (3f), Eoin O'Connor 0-1, Alan Douglas 0-1	Report	Pts: Daithi McGowan 1-2 (1tp), Eamon Wallace 0-4 (1tp), Cian Rogers 1-0, Bryan McMahon 1-0, Adam Ducie 0-3, Liam Kelly 0-1, Ben Wyer 0-1, Rob Hayes 0-1, Oisín Kelly 0-1, Glenn O'Reilly 0-1, Paddy White 0-1	Referee: Derek Ryan (Na Fianna)

22 August 2026 Round 2	Skryne	4-10 (22) – (18) 2-12	Na Fianna	Batterstown
19:30 IST (UTC+1)

==== Round 3 ====
4 September 2026 Round 3	Trim	0-19 (19) – (16) 1-13	Skryne	Dunganny
19:00 IST (UTC+1)
	Pts: Aaron Lynch 0-13 (6f, 3tpf), Eoin O'Connor 0-2, Conor Quigley 0-1, David Lernihan 0-1 (f), Ciarán Caulfield 0-1, Daire Lynch 0-1	Report	Pts: Darragh Campion 0-7 (5f, 1tp), John Finnerty 1-0, Seán Smyth 0-2 (tp), Rob Gallagher 0-1, James Finnerty 0-1, Oisín Keogh 0-1, Niall Finnerty 0-1 (f)	Referee: Patrick Coyle (Curraha)

4 September 2026 Round 3	Ratoath	1-15 (18) – (12) 1-09	Na Fianna	Summerhill
19:00 IST (UTC+1)		(HT: 1-06 – 1-04)
	Pts: Glenn O'Reilly 1-2 (1tp), Daithi McGowan 0-4 (2f), Cian O'Brien 0-2, Cian Rogers 0-2, Devon Burns 0-1 ('45), Eamon Wallace 0-1, Oisín Kelly 0-1, Adam Ducie 0-1, Jack McGowan 0-1	Report	Pts: Ethan Devine 0-6 (2tpf), Ronan Byrne 1-0, Shane Jordan 0-1, Cormac Rafferty 0-1, Conor Downey 0-1	Referee: Robert Purfield (St Patrick's)

=== Group C ===
Advance to knockout stage Advance to relegation play-off

Team	Matches				Score			Pts
Team	Pld	W	D	L	For	Against	Diff	Pts
Wolfe Tones	3	3	0	0	76	47	+29	6
St. Colmcille's	3	2	0	1	62	60	+2	4
Ballinabrackey	3	1	0	2	40	59	-19	2
Seneschalstown	3	0	0	3	60	72	-12	0

==== Round 1 ====
7 August 2026 Round 1	Wolfe Tones	1-19 (22) – (7) 0-07	Ballinabrackey	Dunganny
19:30 IST (UTC+1)		(HT: 0-08 – 0-07)
	Pts: Tom Gavigan 1-2, Caolan Ward 0-4 (3f), Saran Ó Fionnagain 0-3, Eoin Donegan 0-2 (tp), Thomas O'Reilly 0-2 (2f), Kyle Moran 0-2, Ben Reilly 0-1, Shane McKeever 0-1, Adam O'Neill 0-1, Seán Penny 0-1	Report	Pts: Niall Smullen 0-4 (2tp), Damien Carroll 0-3 (1tp)	Referee: Derek Ryan (Na Fianna)

8 August 2026 Round 1	Seneschalstown	1-18 (21) – (24) 2-18	St Colmcille's	Donore
19:30 IST (UTC+1)		(HT: 1-08 – 1-10)
	Pts: Cian Commons 0-7 (1tp, 1tpf, 2f), Alan Mulvany 0-5 (2tp), Cathal Hickey 0-4 (1tp), Darren O'Brien 1-0, Dylan Keating 0-1, Éamon Finnegan 0-1	Report	Pts: Cormac O'Donoghue 2-2, James Conlon 0-8 (4f), Liam Stafford 0-3, Ben Brennan 0-2, Ruairí O'Grady 0-1, Kyle O'Brien 0-1, Andrew Beakey 0-1 ('45)	Referee: Cormac Reilly (St Mary's)

==== Round 2 ====
21 August 2026 Round 2	St Colmcille's	3-11 (20) – (27) 2-21	Wolfe Tones	Senschalstown
19:30 IST (UTC+1)		(HT: 1-02 – 1-12)
	Pts: David Bell 1-3 (2f, 1m), James McCullen 1-0 (pen), Cormac O'Donoghue 1-0, Kyle O'Brien 0-3 (1tp), Andrew Beakey 0-2 (2f), Oisín Brennan 0-2 (tp), Jeff Kavanagh 0-1		Pts: Thomas O'Reilly 0-8 (4f), Caolan Ward 0-6 (2f, 1'45), Sarán Ó Fionnagáin 1-0, Tom Gavigan 1-0, Eoin Donegan 0-2 (tp), Oisín Martin 0-2, Adam O'Neill 0-1, Seán Penny 0-1, Fiachra Ward 0-1	Referee: Joseph Curran (St Michael's)

23 August 2026 Round 2	Ballinabrackey	2-15 (21) – (19) 2-13	Seneschalstown	Trim
16:00 IST (UTC+1)
	Pts: Adam O'Brien 2-0, Gavin Quinn 0-3, Damien O'Carroll 0-2 (1f), Mark Coffey 0-2, Simon Finn 0-2, Seán Kavanagh 0-2, Richie Coffey 0-1, Danny Quinn 0-1, Niall Smullen 0-1, Chris O'Connor 0-1		Pts: Cian Commons 0-4 (3f), Darren O'Brien 1-0, Alan Mulvany 1-0, Dylan Keating 0-3 (1tp), Robbie Finnegan 0-2 (tp), Colin Scanlon 0-1, Danny Waters 0-1, Eamon Finnegan 0-1, Cathal Finnegan 0-1	Referee: Andrew Smith (Dunshaughlin)

==== Round 3 ====
5 September 2026 Round 3	Ballinabrackey	1-09 (12) – (18) 1-15	St Colmcille's	Dunsany
18:00 IST (UTC+1)		(HT: 1-02 – 0-04)
	Pts: Danny Quinn 0-4 (2f), Gavin Quinn 1-0, Dean Pluck 0-3 (1tpf, 1f), David Carroll 0-2	Report	Pts: David Bell 0-6 (1tp, 2f), Oisín Brennan 1-0, Ben Brennan 0-3 (1tpf, 1'45), Liam Stafford 0-2, Kyle O'Brien 0-2, Shaun Leonard 0-1, Godfrey Ehichoya 0-1	Referee: David Gough (Slane)

5 September 2026 Round 3	Seneschalstown	3-11 (20) – (27) 1-24	Wolfe Tones	Rathkenny
18:00 IST (UTC+1)		(HT: 2-04 – 0-14)
	Pts: Dylan Keating 2-2 (1tp), Cian Commons 0-4 (1tp), Séimí Byrne 1-0, Cathal Finnegan 0-2 (1f), Ronan Conneely 0-2 (tp), Alan Mulvaney 0-1	Report	Pts: Thomas O'Reilly 0-5 (1tp), Tom Gavigan 1-1, Caolan Ward 0-4 (1f), Kyle Moran 0-4, Saran Ó Fionnagáin 0-3, Seán Penny 0-2, Conor Sheppard 0-1, Brughach Ó Fionnagáin 0-1, Ross Gallagher 0-1, Fiachra Ward 0-1, Oisín Martin 0-1	Referee: Kieran Olwell (Moynalty)

=== Group D ===
Advance to knockout stage Advance to relegation play-off

Team	Matches				Score			Pts
Team	Pld	W	D	L	For	Against	Diff	Pts
Donaghmore/ Ashbourne	3	2	0	1	58	38	+20	4
Dunshaughlin	3	2	0	1	67	59	+8	4
Gaeil Colmcille	3	2	0	1	59	43	+16	4
Simonstown Gaels	3	0	0	3	34	78	-44	0

==== Round 1 ====
8 August 2026 Round 1	Donaghmore/Ashbourne	1-09 (12) – (13) 0-13	Gaeil Colmcille	Walterstown
18:00 IST (UTC+1)		(HT: 0-05 – 0-07)
		Report		Referee: Robert Purfield (St Patrick's)

8 August 2026 Round 1	Simonstown Gaels	2-12 (18) – (27) 0-27	Dunshaughlin	Dunganny
19:30 IST (UTC+1)		(HT: 1-04 – 0-13)
	Pts: Shane McEnery 0-7, Ben Hoey 2-0 Nathan Reilly 0-2, Padraig McKeever 0-1, Will Byrne 0-1, Niall Kane 0-1	Report	Pts: Aaron Murphy 0-12, Conor Duke 0-7, Mathew Costello 0-2, Colm Keane 0-2, Jon McDonagh 0-2, Tadhg Ó Duslaine 0-1, Conor Gray 0-1	Referee: David Coldrick (Blackhall Gaels)

==== Round 2 ====
20 August 2026 Round 2	Dunshaughlin	1-14 (17) – (24) 1-21	Donaghmore/Ashbourne	Ratoath
19:30 IST (UTC+1)		(HT: 0-07 – 0-15)
	Pts: Mathew Costello 0-5 (1tp), Charlie O'Connor 0-4 (1tp), Luke Mitchell 1-0, Aaron Murphy 0-3 (1f), Fursey Blake 0-1, Conor Duke 0-1	Report	Pts: Evan Kelly 1-1, Andy Tormey 0-4 (3f), Darragh McGovern 0-3 (1tp), Bryan Menton 0-3 (1tp), Stephen Carton 0-3, Zach Thornton 0-2 (tp), Kevin Cully 0-2 (tp), Seán Tyrrell 0-1, Conor Carton 0-1, Thomas McGovern 0-1	Referee: Patrick Coyle (Curraha)

22 August 2026 Round 2	Gaeil Colmcille	4-17 (29) – (8) 1-05	Simonstown Gaels	Martry
18:00 IST (UTC+1)		(HT: 2-08 – 0-02)
	Pts: Charlie Twomey 1-5, Andrew Gormley 0-6 (1f, 2tpf, 1tp), Evan Sheridan 1-1, Liam Ferguson 1-0, John Gormley 1-0, Barry Farrelly 0-2 (tpf), Harry Butler 0-1, Liam Barry 0-1	Report	Pts: Ben Hoey 1-0 (pen), Niall Kane 0-2, Padraig McKeever 0-2 (1f), Will Byrne 0-1	Referee: Kieran Olwell (Moynalty)

==== Round 3 ====
6 September 2026 Round 3	Dunshaughlin	4-11 (23) – (17) 2-11	Gaeil Colmcille	Dunganny
16:00 IST (UTC+1)		(HT: 1-08 – 0-06)
	Pts: Niall Byrne 2-0, Aaron Murphy 0-4 (1f), John McDonagh 1-0, Jeff Foley 1-0, Conor Duke 0-3 (1tpf), Mathew Costello 0-2, Charlie O'Connor 0-2 (tp)	Report	Pts: Liam Ferguson 1-1, Shane Callaghan 1-0, Andrew Gormley 0-3 (3f), Ajay Tormley 0-2, Evan Sheridan 0-2 (tp), Seamus Mattimoe 0-1, Conor Óg Ferguson 0-1, Charlie Twomey 0-1	Referee: David Coldrick (Blackhall Gaels)

6 September 2026 Round 3	Donaghmore/Ashbourne	2-16 (22) – (8) 0-08	Simonstown Gaels	Skryne
16:00 IST (UTC+1)		(HT: 0-08 – 0-02)
	Pts: Seán Tyrell 1-1, Andy Tormey 0-4 (3f), Evan Quinn 1-0, Zach Thornton 0-3 (1f), Bryan Menton 0-3 (1tp), Andy Colgan 0-2 (tpf), Kevin Fenton 0-2, Shane Melia 0-1	Report	Pts: Shane McEnery 0-4 (2f, 1tpf), Aaron Farrelly 0-4 (1f, 1tp)	Referee: Derek Ryan (Na Fianna)

== Relegation Play-off ==
The relegation play-off will consist of the 4th placed teams from each group. The winners of each playoff retain their senior status while the outright loser will be relegated to the Intermediate Championship for 2027. The draw for the relegation playoff semi-finals was made on 6 September 2026.

=== Relegation Semi-Finals ===
17 September 2026 Relegation Semi-Final	Kilbride	0-21 (21) – (18) 1-15 (a.e.t.)	Na Fianna	Kilcloon
20:00 IST (UTC+1)				Venue: Blackhall Gaels GAA

18 September 2026 Relegation Semi-Final	Seneschalstown	1-26 (29) – (25) 2-19 (a.e.t.)	Simonstown Gaels	Skryne
20:00 IST (UTC+1)				Venue: Skryne GFC

=== Relegation Final ===
2 October 2026 Relegation Final	Na Fianna	2-10 (16) – (13) 0-13	Simonstown Gaels	Dunganny
20:00 IST (UTC+1)
		Report

== Knock-out Stage ==
The 1st and 2nd placed teams in each group will qualify for the quarter-finals. One 1st placed team will be drawn against a 2nd placed team in each pair with no repeats from the group stage. The draw for the quarter-finals was made on 6 September 2026.

=== Bracket ===
Quarter-finals
19 September, Dunganny
Wolfe Tones	1-12
Rathkenny	0-13
20 September, Trim
Summerhill	0-30
St Colmcille's	1-16
19 September, Dunsany
Donaghmore/Ashbourne	2-20
Trim	1-09
20 September, Dunganny
Ratoath	2-18
Dunshaughlin	2-16

Semi-finals
4 October, Dunganny
Wolfe Tones	1-17
Summerhill	0-14
3 October, Dunganny
Donaghmore/Ashbourne	1-14
Ratoath	0-12

Final
18 October, Ashbourne
Wolfe Tones	1-19
Donaghmore/Ashbourne	0-12

=== Quarter-Finals ===
19 September 2026 Quarter-Final	Wolfe Tones	1-12 (15) – (13) 0-13	Rathkenny	Dunganny
15:00 IST (UTC+1)		(HT: 0-08 – 0-06)
	Pts: Kyle Moran 1-1, Thomas O'Reilly 0-4 (2f, 1tp), Caolan Ward 0-3 (1tpf, 1'45), Oisín Martin 0-1, Fiachra Ward 0-1, Tom Gavigan 0-1, Cian O'Neill 0-1	Report	Pts: Keith Curtis 0-11 (3f, 2tpf, 1'45), Joey Curtis 0-1, Davy Curtis 0-1 (f)	Referee: David Coldrick (Blackhall Gaels)

19 September 2026 Quarter-Final	Donaghmore/Ashbourne	2-20 (26) – (12) 1-09	Trim	Dunsany
16:30 IST (UTC+1)		(HT: 1-10 – 0-05)
	Pts: Andy Tormey 0-7 (3f, 1tp), Seán Tyrell 1-0, Stephen Carton 1-0, Kevin Fenton 0-3 (1tp), Andy Colgan 0-3 (1tpf), Darragh McGovern 0-2 (tp), Conor Carton 0-2 (tp), Shane Melia 0-1, Bryan Menton 0-1, Jamie Browne 0-1	Report	Pts: Aaron Lynch 1-4 (1pen, 3f), James Murray 0-2 (tp), Daire Lynch 0-2 (tp), Alan Douglas 0-1	Referee: Kieran Olwell (Moynalty)

20 September 2026 Quarter-Final	Ratoath	2-18 (24) – (22) 2-16	Dunshaughlin	Dunganny
13:30 IST (UTC+1)		(HT: 1-06 – 1-12)
	Pts: Daithí McGowan 1-9 (1f, 1tpf, 2tp), Bobby O'Brien 1-2, Gavin McGowan 0-2, Liam Kelly 0-1, Glen O'Reilly 0-1, Cian Rogers 0-1, Adam Ducie 0-1, Joey Wallace 0-1	Report	Pts: Mathew Costello 0-6 (2f, 1tpf), Luke Mitchell 1-2 (1tpf), Ryan Robinson 1-1, Charlie O'Connor 0-2 (tp), Conor Duke 0-2 (tp), Aaron Murphy 0-2 (1f), Jared Rushe 0-1	Referee: David Gough (Slane)

20 September 2026 Quarter-Final	Summerhill	0-30 (30) – (19) 1-16	St Colmcille's	Trim
15:30 IST (UTC+1)		(HT: 0-14 – 1-11)		Venue: St Loman's Park
	Pts: Eoghan Frayne 0-10 (1tp, 2tpf, 2f), Seán Muddiman 0-6 (2tpf, 2'45), Liam Shaw 0-4, Jamie O'Shea 0-3, Kevin Ryan 0-2, Adam McDonnell 0-2 (tp), Ben Moran 0-1, Padhraig Geraghty 0-1, David Larkin 0-1	Report	Pts: Ben Brennan 0-7 (2tpf, 1f), Cormac O'Donoghue 1-1, Kyle O'Brien 0-2 (tp), Eoghan McCloghan 0-2 (tp), Andrew Beakey 0-1 ('45), Liam Stafford 0-1, Cormac O'Donoghue 0-1, Danny Ehichoya 0-1	Referee: Patrick Coyle (Curraha)

=== Semi-Finals ===
The draw for the semi-finals was made on 20 September 2026.

3 October 2026 Semi-Final	Ratoath	0-12 (12) – (17) 1-14	Donaghmore/Ashbourne	Dunganny
16:00 IST (UTC+1)		(HT: 0-05 – 0-06)
	Pts: Adam Ducie 0-4 (1f), Daithí McGowan 0-3 (1tpf, 1f), Devon Burns 0-2 (tpf), Jack Flynn 0-1, Bryan McMahon 0-1, Cian Rogers 0-1	Report	Pts: Darragh McGovern 1-2, Zach Thornton 0-3 (2f), Andy Colgan 0-2 (tpf), Bryan Menton 0-2, Shane Melia 0-1, Seán Tyrell 0-1, Thomas McGovern 0-1, Andy Tormey 0-1 (f), Evan Kelly 0-1	Referee: Cormac Reilly (St Mary's)

4 October 2026 Semi-Final	Summerhill	0-14 (14) – (20) 1-17	Wolfe Tones	Dunganny
14:00 IST (UTC+1)		(HT: 0-08 – 1-10)
	Pts: Eoghan Frayne 0-5 (2f), David Larkin 0-3 (1tp), Jack Bannon 0-2 (tp), Liam Shaw 0-2 (tp), Adam McDonnell 0-1, Barry Dardis 0-1	Report	Pts: Kyle Moran 1-3 (1tp), Caolan Ward 0-6 (1f, 1tpf), Oisín Martin 0-4, Thomas O'Reilly 0-3 (1tpf, 1f), Seán Penny 0-1	Referee: Kieran Olwell (Moynalty)

=== Final ===
It was Donaghmore/Ashbourne's first final in 10 years, and were hoping to win their first Keegan Cup since 1942. They also had an historic opportunity as the final was at their home ground since Páirc Tailteann was under redevelopment.

For Wolfe Tones it was their first SFC final since 2024 when they lost to Dunshaughlin. They were looking to win their 3rd SFC title.

It was the first time that Donaghmore/Ashbourne and Wolfe Tones ever faced each other in a Meath SFC final.

Wolfe Tones were slight favourites: 10/11. Donaghmore/Ashbourne were slight underdogs at 11/10.

18 October 2026
14:00 IST (UTC+1)
Final

Report

Donaghmore/Ashbourne	0-12 (12) – (22) 1-19	Wolfe Tones
(HT: 0-08 – 1-08)
Pts: Andrew Colgan 0-3 (1tpf, 1'45), Andrew Tormey 0-2 (2f), Darragh McGovern 0-2, Zach Thornton 0-2 (2f), Bryan Menton 0-1, Kevin Fenton 0-1, Stephen Carton 0-1		Pts: Caolan Ward 0-6 (1tpf, 2f, 1'45), Saran Ó Fionnagain 0-4, Tom Gavigan 1-0, Oisín Martin 0-3, Thomas O'Reilly 0-3, Kyle Moran 0-2, Seán Penny 0-1

Donaghmore Ashbourne GAA, Ashbourne
Referee: David Coldrick (Blackhall Gaels)

Donaghmore/Ashbourne	Wolfe Tones
