= 2026 Meath county football team season =

Gaelic football team meath season 2026

Meath county football team
2026 season
| Manager | Robbie Brennan |
| Captain | Eoghan Frayne |
| NFL D2 | Champions |
| Leinster SFC | Quarter-Finals |
| All-Ireland SFC | Round 3 |
| O'Byrne Cup | Quarter-Finals |
| Top scorer League | Jordan Morris (3-32) |
| Top scorer Championship | James Conlon (0-20) |

The following is a summary of Meath county football team's 2026 season.

== Competitions ==
Meath competed in the pre-season competition the O'Byrne Cup, with the main season consisting of the National Football League Division 2, the Leinster championship and the All-Ireland Senior Football Championship.

== O'Byrne Cup ==
The draw for the 2026 O'Byrne Cup was announced on 4 November 2025, with the tournament commencing on the 3 January 2026.

=== Fixtures ===
==== Round 1 ====
| 3 January 2026 Round 1 | Wicklow | 1-12 (15) – (17) 2-11 | Meath | Aughrim |
| 13:30 IST (UTC+0) | | (HT: 0-4 - 2-7) | | Venue: Echelon Park |
| | Pts: Padraig O'Toole 1-1, Mark Jackson 0-4 (2tpf), Dean Healy 0-2, Jack Hardy 0-1, Oisin McGraynor 0-1, Chris O'Brien 0-1, Paidi Kavanagh 0-1, Eoin Darcy 0-1 | Report | Pts: Diarmuid Moriarty 1-4 (2f), Killian Smyth 1-0, Niall Finnerty 0-3 (1tp), Conor Gray 0-2 (tp), Oisin Martin 0-2 | Referee: Paddy McDermott (Kildare) |

==== Quarter-Final ====
| 7 January 2026 Quarter-Final | Offaly | 2-13 (19) – (15) 0-15 | Meath | Gracefield |
| 19:30 IST (UTC+0) | | (HT: 2-9 - 0-6) | | Venue: Gracefield GAA |
| | Pts: Jordan Hayes 1-4 (1tpf), Ciaran Murphy 0-3, Cormac Egan 1-0, Keith O'Neill 0-2 (1f), Daire McDaid 0-1, Ryan Egan 0-1, Eoin Sawyer 0-1, Jack Bryant 0-1 (f) | Report | Pts: Daithi McGowan 0-6 (1tpf, 3f), Diarmuid Moriarty 0-4 (1tpf), Oisin Martin 0-2 (tp), Darragh Campion 0-2, Rian Stafford 0-1 | Referee: Enda Kelly (Westmeath) |

== National Football League Division 2 ==
Official fixtures for the 2026 National League were announced on 4 December 2025.

=== Fixtures ===
Win Draw Loss Postponed/Cancelled

| Date | Round | Home | Score | Away | Ground | Ref |
|---|---|---|---|---|---|---|
| Saturday 24 January | Group | Meath | 0-19 v 1-13 | Derry | Croke Park, Dublin | |
| Sunday 1 February | Group | Cavan | 1-18 - 2-17 | Meath | Breffni Park, Cavan | |
| Saturday 14 February | Group | Meath | 1-20 - 0-22 | Louth | Croke Park, Dublin | |
| Sunday 22 February | Group | Cork | 1-23 - 1-21 | Meath | Páirc Uí Rinn, Cork | |
| Saturday 28 February | Group | Kildare | 0-10 - 1-21 | Meath | St Conleth's Park, Newbridge | |
| Saturday 14 March | Group | Meath | 3-24 - 2-22 | Tyrone | Croke Park, Dublin | |
| Sunday 22 March | Group | Offaly | 0-18 v 2-22 | Meath | O'Connor Park, Tullamore | |
| Sunday 29 March | Final | Cork | 2-17 - 1-22 | Meath | Croke Park, Dublin | |

=== Table ===
| Pos | Team | Pld | W | D | L | PF | PA | PD | Pts | Qualification |
|---|---|---|---|---|---|---|---|---|---|---|
| 1 | Cork (Note: Cork are ranked ahead of Meath as they won the head-to-head game between the two teams.) | 7 | 6 | 0 | 1 | 164 | 159 | +5 | 12 | Advance to NFL Division 2 Final and promotion to 2027 NFL Division 1 |
| 2 | Meath | 7 | 6 | 0 | 1 | 174 | 141 | +33 | 12 | Advance to NFL Division 2 Final and promotion to 2027 NFL Division 1 |
| 3 | Louth (Note: Louth are ranked ahead of Derry as they won the head-to-head game between the two teams.) | 7 | 5 | 0 | 2 | 154 | 133 | +21 | 10 | |
| 4 | Derry | 7 | 5 | 0 | 2 | 164 | 118 | +46 | 10 | |
| 5 | Tyrone | 7 | 2 | 1 | 4 | 154 | 149 | +5 | 5 | |
| 6 | Cavan | 7 | 2 | 0 | 5 | 137 | 161 | −24 | 4 | |
| 7 | Kildare | 7 | 1 | 1 | 5 | 142 | 165 | −23 | 3 | Relegation to 2027 NFL Division 3 |
| 8 | Offaly | 7 | 0 | 0 | 7 | 124 | 187 | −63 | 0 | Relegation to 2027 NFL Division 3 |

Source: GAA.ie
Rules for classification: Tiebreakers

=== Reports ===
| 24 January 2026 Round 1 | Meath | 0-19 (19) – (16) 1-13 | Derry | Dublin |
| 15:00 GMT (UTC+0) | | (HT: 0-11 - 1-5) | | Venue: Croke Park |
| | Pts: Jack Flynn 0-7 (1tp, 1tpf, 1'45), Matthew Costello 0-3 (1tpf, 1f), Jordan Morris 0-3 (1tp), Sean Brennan 0-2 (1tpf), Eoghan Frayne 0-1, Bryan Menton 0-1, James Conlon 0-1, Ciaran Caulfield 0-1 | Report | Pts: Shane McGuigan 0-7 (1tpf, 1f), Paul Cassidy 1-3 (1tp), Gareth McKinless 0-1, Ethan Doherty 0-1, Matthew Downey 0-1 | Referee: Barry Tiernan (Dublin) |

| 1 February 2026 Round 2 | Cavan | 1-18 (21) – (23) 2-17 | Meath | Cavan |
| 15:45 GMT (UTC+0) | | (HT: 1-8 - 1-8) | | Venue: Breffni Park |
| | Pts: Gearoid McKiernan 0-9 (1tpf, 4f), Peter Corrigan 1-0, Oisin Brady 0-4 (2f), Dara McVeety 0-2, Cormac O'Reilly 0-1, Gerard Smith 0-1, Caoiman McGovern 0-1 | Report | Pts: Jordan Morris 1-4 (1 pen), Ruairi Kinsella 1-2, James Conlon 0-3, Jack Flynn 0-2 (tp), Matthew Costello 0-2, Eoghan Frayne 0-1, Sean Coffey 0-1, Conor Duke 0-1, Ciaran Caulfield 0-1 | Referee: Kieran Eannetta (Tyrone); Attendance: 6,883 |

| 14 February 2026 Round 3 | Meath | 1-20 (23) – (22) 0-22 | Louth | Dublin |
| 17:00 GMT (UTC+0) | | (HT: 1-15 - 0-7) | | Venue: Croke Park |
| | Pts: Ruairi Kinsella 1-3 (1tp), Jordan Morris 0-6 (1tp, 1f), Matthew Costello 0-3 (1tp), Jack Flynn 0-3 (1tp), Aaron Lynch 0-2, Bryan Menton 0-1, Eoghan Frayne 0-1 (f), Jack O'Connor 0-1 | Report | Pts: Sam Mulroy 0-9 (4tpf, 1f), Craig Lennon 0-4, Paul Matthews 0-3 (1tp), Ciaran Downey 0-2, Conor Grimes 0-1, Dara McDonnell 0-1, Tadhg McDonnell 0-1, Ciaran Keenan 0-1 | Referee: Brendan Griffin (Kerry) |

| 22 February 2026 Round 4 | Cork | 1-23 (26) – (24) 1-21 | Meath | Cork |
| 14:00 GMT (UTC+0) | | (HT: 1-15 - 0-11) | | Venue: Páirc Uí Rinn |
| | Pts: Chris Og Jones 1-4, Mark Cronin 0-5 (2tp), Dara Sheedy 0-4, Steven Sherlock 0-4 (1tp, 1f, 1'45), Sean McDonnell 0-3, Luke Fahy 0-1, Colm O'Callaghan 0-1, Ian Maguire 0-1 | Report | Pts: Eoghan Frayne 1-3, Jordan Morris 0-4 (1f), Jack Flynn 0-3, Ruairi Kinsella 0-3, Sean Brennan 0-2 (tpf), Aaron Lynch 0-2, Jack O'Connor 0-2, Sean Coffey 0-1, Ciaran Caulfield 0-1 | Referee: Conor Dourneen (Cavan) |

| 28 February 2026 Round 5 | Kildare | 0-10 (10) – (24) 1-21 | Meath | Newbridge |
| 19:00 GMT (UTC+0) | | (HT: 0-5 - 1-9) | | Venue: St. Conleth's Park |
| | Pts: Ben Loakman 0-3 (2f), Brian McLoughlin (1tp) 0-3, Darragh Kirwan 0-2 (tp), Alex Beirne 0-1 (1f), Colm Moran 0-1 | Report | Pts: Jordan Morris 1-5, Sean Brennan 0-5 (2tpf, 1'45), Jack O'Connor 0-4, Ruairi Kinsella 0-2, Aaron Lynch 0-1, Eoghan Frayne 0-1, Jack Flynn 0-1, Charlie O'Connor 0-1, Keith Curtis 0-1 | Referee: Sean Hurson (Tyrone) |

| 14 March 2026 Round 6 | Meath | 3-24 (33) – (28) 2-22 | Tyrone | Dublin |
| 17:00 GMT (UTC+0) | | (HT: 2-12 - 1-11) | | Venue: Croke Park |
| | Pts: Jack O’Connor. 1-8 (4tp), Aaron Lynch 2-1, Ruairi Kinsella 0-5 (2tp), Eoghan Frayne 0-4 (1tp), Seán Brennan 0-2 (tpf), Jordan Morris 0-1 (f), Seán Coffey 0-1, Ciarán Caulfield 0-1, Bryan Menton 0-1 | Report | Pts: Ethan Jordan 1-9 (4’45, 2tp, 1f), Darren McCurry 0-4 (2f), Niall Devlin 1-0, Darragh Canavan 0-2 (tp), Ruairì Canavan 0-2, Ronan Cassidy 0-2, Mattie Donnelly 0-1, Seánie O’Donnell 0-1, Joey Clarke 0-1 | Referee: Niall Cullen (Fermanagh) |

| 22 March 2026 Round 7 | Offaly | 0-18 (18) – (28) 2-22 | Meath | Tullamore |
| 13:15 GMT (UTC+0) | | (HT: 0-9 - 2-9) | | Venue: O'Connor Park |
| | Pts: Darragh Flynn 0-4, Daire McDaid 0-3 (1tp), Jordan Hayes 0-3, Harry Plunkett 0-3 (1f), Shane Tierney 0-2 (1f), Conor Melia 0-2 (tpf), Eoin Sawyer 0-1 | Report | Pts: Jordan Morris 1-6 (1f, 1pen), Bryan Menton 1-0, Aaron Lynch 0-3, Eoghan Frayne 0-2, Donal Keoghan 0-2, Sean Brennan 0-2 (tpf), James Conlon 0-2, Cian McBride 0-1, Ruairí Kinsella 0-1, Ciaran Caulfield 0-1, Seán Coffey 0-1, Jason Scully 0-1 | Referee: Séamus Mulhare (Laois) |

| 29 March 2026 Final | Cork | 2-17 (23) – (25) 1-22 | Meath | Dublin |
| 13:45 GMT (UTC+0) | | (HT: 0-12 - 0-10) | | Venue: Croke Park |
| | Pts: Steven Sherlock 0-9 (1f, 1tp), Chris Óg Jones 1-3, Brian Hurley 1-0, Paul Walsh 0-2, Colm O'Callaghan 0-2, Mark Cronin 0-1 | Report | Pts: Jack O'Connor 1-2 (tp), Ruairí Kinsella 0-5 (2tp), James Conlon 0-4, Jordan Morris 0-3 (1f), Seán Brennan 0-3 (1tpf, 1'45), Eoghan Frayne 0-3 (3f), Aaron Lynch 0-1, Ciarán Caulfield 0-1 | Referee: Brendan Griffin (Kerry); TV: TG4 |

== Leinster Senior Football Championship ==
The draw for the 2026 Leinster Senior Football Championship was held at Croke Park on 27 November 2025.

=== Bracket ===
Preliminary round
12 April, Carlow
Carlow | 1-7
Wicklow | 2-15
11 April, Tullamore
Offaly | 0-12
Laois | 3-12
12 April, Longford
Longford | 1-16
Westmeath | 5-25

Quarter-finals
19 April, Carlow
Louth | 1-25
Wexford | 0-11
19 April, Aughrim
Dublin | 2-16
Wicklow | 2-14
19 April, Newbridge
Kildare | 2-20
Laois | 2-15
19 April, Tullamore
Meath | 0-25
Westmeath | 4-18

Semi-finals
2 May, Portlaoise
Louth | 0-10
Dublin | 0-20
3 May Tullamore
Kildare | 0-23
Westmeath | 2-21

Final
17 May, Dublin
Dublin | 0-26
Westmeath | 2-28

=== Matches ===
| 19 April 2026 Quarter-Final | Meath | 0-25 (25) – (30) 4-18 | Westmeath | Tullamore |
| 14:00 IST (UTC+1) | | (HT: 0-9 - 2-9) | | Venue: Glenisk O'Connor Park |
| | Pts: Ruairí Kinsella 0-6 (2tp), Eoghan Frayne 0-4 (1tpf), James Conlon 0-4, Jack Flynn 0-3 (1tp), Jordan Morris 0-3 (2f), Jack O'Connor 0-2, Aaron Lynch 0-2, Bryan Menton 0-1 | Report | Pts: Luke Loughlin 0-6 (1tp), Shane Corcoran 1-2, Sam McCartan 0-4 (3f), Matthew Whittaker 1-0, Robbie Forde 1-0, Danny McCartan 1-0, Ray Connellan 0-2, Brandon Kelly 0-2 (1m), Brian Cooney 0-1, Kevin O'Sullivan 0-1 | Referee: Liam Devenney (Mayo); Attendance: 9,184 |

== All-Ireland Senior Football Championship ==
The draw for Round 1 of the 2026 All-Ireland Senior Football Championship was held on 4 May 2026. The draw for Round 2 was held on 2 June 2026 and the draw for Round 3 was held on 15 June 2026.

=== Matches ===
| 23 May 2026 Round 1 | Cork | 0-30 (30) – (27) 1-24 | Meath | Cork |
| 17:30 | | (HT: 0-11 – 1-16) | | Venue: Páirc Uí Rinn |
| | Pts: Steven Sherlock 0-14 (3tp, 1tpf, 5f, 1'45), Mark Cronin 0-5 (1tpf, 1f), David Buckley 0-3 (1tp), Colm O'Callaghan 0-2, Maurice Shanley 0-1, Daniel O'Mahony 0-1, Ian Maguire 0-1, Paul Walsh 0-1, Chris Óg Jones 0-1, Conor Corbett 0-1; Colm O'Callaghan (red card) 51' | Report | Pts: James Conlon 0-7 (1tp), Eoghan Frayne 0-5 (2tp, 1f), Ruairí Kinsella 0-5 (1tp), Seán Brennan 0-4 (2tpf), Ciarán Caulfield 1-0, Jordan Morris 0-2, Mathew Costello 0-1 | Referee: Brendan Cawley (Kildare); Attendance: 8,526; TV: GAA+ |

| 13 June 2026 Round 2B | Derry | 1-20 (23) – (27) 1-24 | Meath | Derry |
| 19:00 | | (HT: 1-09 – 1-09) | | Venue: Celtic Park |
| | Pts: James Sargent 1-2 (1'45), Shane McGuigan 0-4 (1tpf), Lachlan Murray 0-4 (1tp), Eoin McEvoy 0-4, Brendan Rogers 0-2 (tp), Ruairí Forbes 0-2, Gareth McKinless 0-1, Conall Higgins 0-1 | Report | Pts: James Conlon 0-7, Donal Keogan 1-2, Jack Flynn 0-3 (1tp), Bryan Menton 0-3 (1tp), Mathew Costello 0-2, Seán Brennan 0-2 (tpf), Jordan Morris 0-2, Jack O'Connor 0-1, Eoghan Frayne 0-1 (f), Killian Smyth 0-1 | Referee: Seán Hurson (Tyrone); TV: GAA+ |

| 20 June 2026 Round 3 | Mayo | 0-22 (22) – (19) 2-13 | Meath | Castlebar |
| 18:15 | | (HT: 0-07 – 2-08) | | Venue: MacHale Park |
| | Pts: Jordan Flynn 0-5 (2tp), Ryan O'Donoghue 0-4 (1f), Kobe McDonald 0-4 (1'45), Tommy Conroy 0-3, Jack Carney 0-2 (tp), Enda Hession 0-2, Bob Tuohy 0-1, Cian McHale 0-1 | Report | Pts: Ciarán Caulfield 1-1, Seán Coffey 1-1, Jordan Morris 0-2, James Conlon 0-2, Jack O'Connor 0-2, Seán Brennan 0-1 ('45), Cian McBride 0-1, Bryan Menton 0-1, Mathew Costello 0-1, Jack Flynn 0-1 | Referee: Paul Faloon (Down); Attendance: 15,627; TV: GAA+ |

== Awards ==
=== GAA.ie Football Team of the Week ===
26 January: Jack Flynn

3 February: Jordan Morris

2 March: Jordan Morris

16 March: Jack O'Connor (nominated for Footballer of the week)

23 March: Donal Keogan

30 March: Ciarán Caulfield, James Conlon, Ruairí Kinsella (Kinsella was nominated for Footballer of the week)

25 May: James Conlon

15 June: Donal Keogan, James Conlon
