= Shane McCoy =

Irish Gaelic footballer

Sport
- Sport: Gaelic football
- Position: Goalkeeper
Club
- Years: Club
- Roche Emmets
Inter-county
- Years: County
- Louth

Shane McCoy is an Irish Gaelic football manager who played as a goalkeeper for Roche Emmets and the Louth county team. He won the 2009 National League Division 2 title with Louth. For 2004 he was Louth senior player of the year.

For the 2026 season he was managing Wolfe Tones of Meath, having earlier spent three seasons managing Meath Hill. He led Meath Hill to the 2024 Meath Intermediate Football Championship title, but relegation from the 2025 Meath Senior Football Championship followed. As well as this, he had managed Roche Emmets and Dromintee of Armagh.
