= Mathew Costello =

Meath Gaelic footballer

Mathew Costello (born 12th June 2001) is an Irish Gaelic footballer who plays for Dunshaughlin and the Meath county team. A forward, his performances for Meath led to his selection as the 2023 Tailteann Cup Footballer of the Year.

Costello formerly captained the Meath under-20 county team. As of 2024, he was vice-captain of the Meath senior team. With Dunshaughlin he won Division 1B in 2024, then helped the club to the 2024 Meath Senior Football Championship (a team first in 22 years) – scoring an important goal against Wolfe Tones in the final. Shortly before that he had given the ball away to Cian Ward, allowing Ward to score what appeared to be the decisive goal of the game. Throughout the 2024 championship Costello scored 3–14 (including 0–8 in frees), and – at the season's conclusion – he was selected as Footballer of the Year.

He scored Meath's goal in the 2025 Leinster Senior Football Championship final. Meath lost.
