= 2006 Meath Senior Football Championship =

Meath S.F.C.
- Season: 2006
- Champions: Wolfe Tones; 1st Senior Football Championship title
- Relegated: Cortown
- Leinster SCFC: Wolfe Tones (Quarter-final Replay) UCD 1-11, Wolfe Tones 0-11
- All Ireland SCFC: N/A
- Winning Captain: Darren McGrath (Wolfe Tones)
- Man of the Match: Cian Ward (Wolfe Tones)

The 2006 Meath Senior Football Championship was the 114th edition of the Meath GAA's premier club Gaelic football tournament for senior graded teams in County Meath, Ireland. The tournament consists of 16 teams, with the winner going on to represent Meath in the Leinster Senior Club Football Championship. The championship starts with a group stage and then progresses to a knock out stage.

St. Peter's Dunboyne were the defending champions after they defeated Navan O'Mahonys in the previous years final.

Duleek were promoted after claiming the 2005 Meath Intermediate Football Championship title, their first Intermediate win since 1978.

On 15 October 2006, Wolfe Tones claimed their 1st Senior Championship title when they defeated Navan O'Mahonys 1-9 to 1-7. Darren McGrath lifted the Tones first ever Keegan Cup while Cian Ward claimed the 'Man of the Match' award.

Cortown were relegated after 10 years in the senior grade.

The group match between Seneschalstown and Cortown at Simonstown on 8 September 2006 was the first ever Meath Senior Football Championship match to be played under lights.

== Team changes ==
The following teams have changed division since the 2005 championship season.

=== To S.F.C. ===
Promoted from I.F.C.

- Duleek - (Intermediate Champions)

=== From S.F.C. ===
Relegated to I.F.C.

- Dunderry

== Participating teams ==
The teams taking part in the 2006 Meath Senior Football Championship are:

Club	Location	2005 Championship Position	2006 Championship Position
Ballinlough	Ballinlough & Kilskyre	Preliminary Relegation Play Off	Non Qualifier
Blackhall Gaels	Batterstown & Kilcloon	Finalist	Semi-Finalist
Cortown	Cortown	Preliminary Relegation Play Off	Relegated to I.F.C
Duleek	Duleek & Bellewstown	I.F.C Champions	Non Qualifier
Dunshaughlin	Dunshaughlin & Drumree	Quarter-Finalist	Non Qualifier
Kilmainhamwood	Kilmainhamwood	Relegation Play Off	Relegation Play Off
Navan O'Mahonys	Navan	Semi-Finalist	Finalist
Seneschalstown	Kentstown & Yellow Furze	Non Qualifier	Non Qualifier
Simonstown Gaels	Navan	Quarter-Finalist	Semi-Finalist
Skryne	Skryne & Tara	Non Qualifier	Non Qualifier
St. Patrick's	Stamullen	Quarter-Finalist	Quarter-Finalist
St. Peter's Dunboyne	Dunboyne	Champions	Quarter-Finalist
Summerhill	Summerhill	Non Qualifier	Non Qualifier
Trim	Trim	Semi-Finalist	Quarter-Finalist
Walterstown	Navan	Non Qualifier	Quarter-Finalist
Wolfe Tones	Kilberry, Gibbstown, Oristown & Wilkinstown	Quarter-Finalist	Champions

== Group stage ==
There are 2 groups called Group A and B. The 4 top finishers in Group A and B will qualify for the quarter-finals. The 2 teams that finish last in their groups will play in a relegation play off.

=== Group A ===
Team	Pld	W	L	D	PF	PA	PD	Pts
Blackhall Gaels	7	4	0	3	98	88	+10	11
Navan O'Mahonys	7	5	1	1	91	71	+20	11
St. Patrick's	7	4	2	1	121	78	+43	9
Simonstown Gaels	7	3	3	1	82	81	+1	7
Duleek	7	2	3	2	89	88	+1	6
Summerhill	7	1	3	3	80	81	-1	5
Dunshaughlin	7	0	3	4	85	97	-12	4
Kilmainhamwood	7	1	5	1	59	121	-62	3

Round 1:

- Kilmainhamwood 2-7, 1-10 Dunshaughlin, Simonstown,
- Navan O'Mahonys 1-11, 1-9 St. Patrick's, Ratoath,
- Blackhall Gaels 0-14, 2-8 Duleek, Skryne,
- Simonstown Gaels 1-8, 0-10 Summerhill, Pairc Tailteann,

Round 2:

- Navan O'Mahonys 2-11, 0-4 Kilmainhamwood, Kells,
- Blackhall Gaels 0-13, 0-11 Summerhill, Dunsany,
- St. Patrick's 2-9, 1-11 Duleek, Bellewstown,
- Simonstown Gaels 1-10, 0-12 Dunshaughlin, Pairc Tailteann,

Round 3:

- Navan O'Mahonys 0-13, 0-12 Dunshaughlin, Pairc Tailteann,
- St. Patrick's 0-6, 0-6 Summerhill, Dunshaughlin,
- Duleek 1-12, 0-7 Kilmainhamwood, Kilberry,
- Blackhall Gaels 2-10, 1-13 Simonstown Gaels, Pairc Tailteann,

Round 4:

- Navan O'Mahonys 0-8, 0-6 Simonstown Gaels, Pairc Tailteann,
- Kilmainhamwood 0-11, 0-9 Summerhill, Bohermeen,
- Dunshaughlin 0-12, 1-9 Duleek, Pairc Tailteann,
- Blackhall Gaels 2-11, 2-8 St. Patrick's, Walterstown

Round 5:

- Navan O'Mahonys 0-15, 1-9 Duleek, Pairc Tailteann,
- Dunshaughlin 1-8, 0-11 Summerhill, Dunsany,
- St. Patrick's 2-14, 0-9 Simonstown Gaels, Skryne,
- Blackhall Gaels 1-11, 2-4 Kilmainhamwood, Simonstown,

Round 6:

- Navan O'Mahonys 3-6, 3-6 Summerhill, Trim,
- Duleek 0-10, 0-9 Simonstown Gaels, Skryne,
- St. Patrick's 5-20, 1-6 Kilmainhamwood, Seneschalstown,
- Dunshaughlin 1-8, 0-11 Summerhill, Dunsany,

Round 7:

- Blackhall Gaels 0-8, 0-7 Navan O'Mahonys, Trim,
- Summerhill 1-13, 1-9 Duleek, Pairc Tailteann,
- Simonstown Gaels 1-15, 0-5 Kilmainhamwood, Kells,
- St. Patrick's 2-13, 0-9 Dunshaughlin, Walterstown,

=== Group B ===
Team	Pld	W	L	D	PF	PA	PD	Pts
Walterstown	7	6	1	0	109	83	+23	12
Wolfe Tones	7	5	1	1	112	79	+33	11
Trim	7	4	1	2	94	65	+29	10
St Peters Dunboyne	7	4	0	3	117	81	+36	8
Seneschalstown	7	3	0	4	97	91	+6	6
Skryne	7	3	0	4	85	86	-1	6
Ballinlough	7	2	0	5	67	137	-70	4
Cortown	7	0	7	0	64	113	-49	0

Round 1:

- Wolfe Tones 0-13, 0-7 Cortown, Moynalty,
- St. Peter's Dunboyne 4-10, 2-12 Walterstown, Dunsany,
- Ballinlough 2-9, 2-7 Skryne, Trim,
- Trim 0-11, 0-10 Seneschalstown, Pairc Tailteann,

Round 2:

- Trim 2-14, 0-4 Cortown, Athboy,
- Walterstown 0-14, 0-12 Seneschalstown, Pairc Tailteann,
- Wolfe Tones 1-11, 2-7 Skryne, Pairc Tailteann,
- St. Peter's Dunboyne 3-19, 0-4 Ballinlough, Simonstown,

Round 3:

- Skryne 2-9, 0-9 Cortown, Simonstown,
- Walterstown 3-8, 0-13 Trim, Pairc Tailteann,
- Seneschalstown 2-17, 1-8 Ballinlough, Bohermeen,
- Wolfe Tones 1-10, 0-9 St. Peter's Dunboyne, Walterstown,

Round 4:

- Walterstown 2-12, 0-6 Cortown, Simonstown,
- Skryne 1-13, 0-14 St. Peter's Dunboyne, Pairc Tailteann,
- Wolfe Tones 1-16, 0-11 Seneschalstown, Pairc Tailteann,
- Trim 0-19, 0-5 Ballinlough, Athboy,

Round 5:

- St. Peter's Dunboyne 1-16, 0-6 Cortown,
- Walterstown 1-14, 1-2 Ballinlough, Bohermeen,
- Skryne 1-9, 1-7 Seneschalstown, Walterstown,
- Wolfe Tones 2-6, 2-6 Trim, Bohermeen,

Round 6:

- Ballinlough 2-8, 0-10 Cortown,
- Walterstown 1-11, 0-13 Wolfe Tones, Pairc Tailteann,
- Trim 0-11, 0-6 Skryne, Pairc Tailteann,
- Seneschalstown 0-17, 0-8 St. Peter's Dunboyne, Dunsany,

Round 7:

- Seneschalstown 1-11, 1-9 Cortown, Simonstown,
- Walterstown 1-10, 0-10 Skryne, Pairc Tailteann,
- St. Peter's Dunboyne 0-11, 0-8 Trim, Pairc Tailteann,
- Wolfe Tones 4-15, 0-13 Ballinlough, Bohermeen,

== Knock-out stage ==
=== Relegation play off ===
Kilmainhamwood 0-13, 0-11 Cortown, Moynalty, 6/10/2006,

=== Finals ===
Quarter-finals
Walterstown	0-11 AET
Simonstown Gaels	1-11 AET
Wolfe Tones	2-6
St. Patricks	0-7
Navan O'Mahonys	1-13
Trim	0-10
St. Peters Dunboyne	0-11
Blackhall Gaels	1-9

Semi-finals
Simonstown Gaels	0-10
Wolfe Tones	1-11
Navan O'Mahonys	2-12
Blackhall Gaels	2-10

Final
Wolfe Tones	1-9
Navan O'Mahonys	1-7

Quarter-final

- Simonstown Gaels 1-11, 0-11 Walterstown, Pairc Tailteann, AET 23/9/2006,
- Wolfe Tones 2-6, 0-7 St. Patrick's, Pairc Tailteann, 23/9/2006,
- Navan O'Mahonys 2-13, 0-10 Trim, Pairc Tailteann, 24/9/2006,
- Blackhall Gaels 1-9, 0-11 St. Peter's Dunboyne, Pairc Tailteann, 24/9/2006,

Semi-final

- Wolfe Tones 1-11, 0-10 Simonstown Gaels, Pairc Tailteann, 1/10/2006,
- Navan O'Mahonys 2-12, 2-10 Blackhall Gaels, Pairc Tailteann, 1/10/2006,

Final:

- Wolfe Tones 1-9, 1-7 Navan O'Mahony's, Pairc Tailteann, 15/10/2006,
