= 2025 Meath Senior Football Championship =

Gaelic Football Senior Championship

133rd Meath Senior Football Championship
Tournament details
- County: Meath
- Province: Leinster
- Year: 2025
- Trophy: Keegan Cup
- Sponsor: Fairyhouse Steel
- Date: 31 July 2025 - 12 October 2025
- Teams: 16
- Defending champions: Dunshaughlin

Winners
- Champions: Summerhill (9th win)
- Manager: Dave Clare
- Captain: Ronan Ryan

Runners-up
- Runners-up: Ratoath
- Manager: Paul Galvin
- Captain: Ben Wyer

Promotion/Relegation
- Relegated team(s): Meath Hill

Other
- Matches played: 34
- Website: Meath GAA

The 2025 Meath Senior Football Championship was the 133rd edition of the Meath GAA's premier club Gaelic football tournament for senior clubs in County Meath, with 16 teams competing. The winner represented Meath in the Leinster Senior Club Football Championship. The championship started with a group stage and then progressed to a knock out stage.

Dunshaughlin were the defending champions after defeating Wolfe Tones to win their 4th S.F.C, and their first since 2002.

For the first time in their history, Meath Hill won the I.F.C by defeating Navan O'Mahonys. This victory secured a place in the Senior Championship for the first time in Meath Hill's 121 year history.

The draw for the group stages of the championship were made on 22 January 2025, with the games commencing on 31 July 2025.

Meath Hill were relegated to the Meath Intermediate Football Championship after losing to St. Colmcille's in the relegation playoff final. It was the first time since 2020 that a team stayed in the Meath Senior Football Championship for only one campaign.

On 12 October 2025, Summerhill played Ratoath for the 3rd time in 4 years in the final. Summerhill won their 9th Keegan Cup by defeating Ratoath 0-16 to 0-13. This was Summerhill's 2nd championship in the space of 3 years.

== Championship structure ==
The 2025 Meath S.F.C. consisted of 16 teams drawn into four groups each containing four teams. The top two teams progressed to the quarter-finals, while the bottom team in each group contested the Relegation Semi-Finals. The losers of the Semi-Finals would play-off for the right to retain their senior status into 2026.

== Team changes ==
The following teams have changed division since the 2024 championship season.

=== To S.F.C. ===
Promoted from 2024 I.F.C.

- Meath Hill - (Intermediate Champions)

=== From S.F.C. ===
Relegated to 2025 I.F.C.

- Curraha

== Participating teams ==
The 16 teams that participated in the 2025 competition were:

Club	Location	Management	Pre C'ship Odds	2024 Championship Position	2025 Championship Position
Ballinabrackey	Ballinabrackey	Ciaran Giblin	125/1	Relegation Finalists	Quarter-Finalist
Donaghmore/Ashbourne	Ashbourne	Timmy O'Regan	8/1	Relegation Quarter-Finalists	Quarter-Finalist
Dunshaughlin	Dunshaughlin & Drumree	Kevin Kealy	5/2	Champions	Semi-Finalist
Gaeil Colmcille	Kells	Conn Cleary	40/1	Relegation Quarter-Finalists	Relegation Semi-Finalist
Meath Hill	Meath HIll	Shane McCoy	80/1	I.F.C Champions	Relegated
Na Fianna	Enfield & Baconstown	Shane Barrett	50/1	Relegation Quarter-Finalists	Non-Qualifier
Rathkenny	Rathkenny	Joey Farrelly	50/1	Relegation Semi-Finalists	Non-Qualifier
Ratoath	Ratoath	Paul Galvin	6/1	Quarter-Finalists	Runners-Up
Seneschalstown	Kentstown & Yellow Furze	David Hosie	80/1	Relegation Semi-Finalists	Non-Qualifier
Simonstown Gaels	Navan	Joe Lyons	20/1	Quarter-Finalists	Relegation Semi-Finalist
Skryne	Skryne & Tara	Mick O'Dowd	16/1	Semi-Finalists	Semi-Finalist
St. Colmcille's	Bettystown, Donacarney, Laytown & Mornington	Paul Kelleher	25/1	Quarter-Finalists	Relegation Finalist
St. Peter's Dunboyne	Dunboyne	Ger Robinson	7/1	Semi-Finalists	Non-Qualifier
Summerhill	Summerhill	Dave Clare	6/1	Quarter-Finalists	Champions
Trim	Trim	Ken Robinson	33/1	Relegation Quarter-Finalists	Quarter-Finalist
Wolfe Tones	Kilberry, Gibbstown, Oristown & Wilkinstown	Paddy Martin	5/1	Runners Up	Quarter-Finalist

== Group stage ==
There were four groups of four teams called Group A, B, C and D. The 1st and 2nd placed teams in each group qualified for the quarter-finals. The 4th placed team in each group proceeded to the Relegation Play-Off to determine which team would be relegated.

The draw for the group stages of the championship was made on 22 January 2025.

=== Group A ===
Advance to knockout stage Advance to relegation play-off

Team	Matches				Score			Pts
Team	Pld	W	D	L	For	Against	Diff	Pts
Skryne	3	3	0	0	54	41	+13	6
Summerhill	3	1	0	2	54	50	+4	2
St. Peter's Dunboyne	3	1	0	2	52	50	+2	2
Gaeil Colmcille	3	1	0	2	44	63	-19	2

==== Round 1 ====
31 July 2025 Round 1	St. Peter's Dunboyne	0-15 (15) – (18) 1-15	Skryne	Navan
19:30		(HT: 0-6 - 0-8)		Venue: Pairc Tailteann
	Pts: John Harkin 0-4 (2tp), Donal Lenihan 0-4 (2f), Robbie McCarthy 0-3 (1f), Michael Murphy 0-2, Eric Lowndes 0-1, Cian Duggan 0-1	Report	Pts: Darragh Campion 0-5 (1f, 1'45, 1tp), Andrew Canavan 1-0, Padraig Finnerty 0-3 (1tp), Niall Finnerty 0-2 (1f), Daniel Fitzpatrick 0-1, Harry Rooney 0-1, Conor O'Brien 0-1, Conor Donohoe 0-1, Charlie Swan 0-1	Referee: Ciaran Flynn

2 August 2025 Round 1	Summerhill	0-19 (19) – (21) 1-18	Gaeil Colmcille	Trim
17:00		(HT: 0-7 - 1-7)
	Pts: Eoghan Frayne 0-4 (1f, 1tpf), Conor Frayne 0-4, Jack Bannon 0-2, Adam McDonnell 0-2 (tp), David Larkin 0-2, Diarmuid McCabe 0-2, Conor Lyons 0-2 (tp), Barry Dardis 0-1	Report	Pts: Barry Farrelly 0-5 (1f, 2tpf), Andrew Gormley 0-4 (4f), Oisin Walsh 1-0, Sam Mattimoe 0-3 (1f, 1tpf), Fionn Reilly 0-2 (tp), Jonny Quigley 0-2, Daniel Farrelly 0-1, Ajay Tormay 0-1	Referee: David Coldrick

==== Round 2 ====
16 August 2025 Round 2	Gaeil Colmcille	1-11 (14) – (22) 1-19	Skryne	Dunganny
17:00		(HT: 0-3 - 0-5)
	Pts: Ryan Farnham 1-1, Seamus Mattimoe 0-3 (1tpf), Andrew Gormley 0-3 (2f), Adam Donnelly 0-1 (f), Ajay Tormay 0-1, Fionn Reilly 0-1, Oisin Reilly 0-1		Pts: Niall Finnerty 0-9 (1tp, 3tpf), Darragh Campion 0-5 (2tp, 1f), Oisin Keogh 1-0, Conor O'Brien 0-1, Billy Smyth 0-1, Conor Donohoe 0-1, Charlie Swan 0-1, Andrew Canavan 0-1	Referee: Andrew Smith

17 August 2025 Round 2	St. Peter's Dunboyne	1-12 (15) – (23) 1-20	Summerhill	Navan
16:00		(HT: 0-7 - 0-9)		Venue: Pairc Tailteann
	Pts: Michael Murphy 1-3 (1tp), Donal Lenihan 0-5 (2f, 1tpf), Jason Gleeson 0-2, David McEntee 0-1, Robbie McCarthy 0-1		Pts: Eoghan Frayne 1-8 (2f, 1tp, 1tpf), Diarmuid McCabe 0-3 (1tp), Kevin Ryan 0-2 (tp), Conor Frayne 0-2, Adam McDonnell 0-2, Jack Bannon 0-1, Jamie O'Shea 0-1, David Larkin 0-1	Referee: Keith Sheerin

==== Round 3 ====
31 August 2025 Round 3	Gaeil Colmcille	0-9 (9) – (22) 3-13	St. Peter's Dunboyne	Trim
16:00		(HT: 0-6 - 1-6)
				Referee: Patrick Coyle

31 August 2025 Round 3	Skryne	0-14 (14) – (12) 0-12	Summerhill	Navan
16:00		(HT: 0-8 - 0-3)		Venue: Pairc Tailteann
	Pts: Niall Finnerty 0-4 (1f), Padraig Finnerty 0-3 (1tp), Billy Smyth 0-2, Daniel Fitzpatrick 0-1, Oisin Keogh 0-1, Darragh Campion 0-1 ('45), Conor Donohoe 0-1, Shane Smyth 0-1		Pts: David Larkin 0-3 (1tp), Conor Frayne 0-2, Conor Lyons 0-2 (tp), Sean Muddiman 0-1 (f), Adam McDonnell 0-1, Kevin Ryan 0-1, Eoghan Frayne 0-1 (f), Kevin Lyons 0-1	Referee: Keith Sheerin

=== Group B ===
Advance to knockout stage Advance to relegation play-off

Team	Matches				Score			Pts
Team	Pld	W	D	L	For	Against	Diff	Pts
Ratoath	3	2	1	0	69	40	+29	5
Ballinabrackey	3	2	0	1	56	44	+12	4
Seneschalstown	3	1	1	1	45	52	-7	3
St. Colmcille's	3	0	0	3	39	73	-34	0

==== Round 1 ====
2 August 2025 Round 1	St. Colmcille's	0-16 (16) – (19) 2-13	Seneschalstown	Stamullen
17:00		(HT: 0-8 - 1-7)
	Pts: David Bell 0-6 (2f), Andrew Beakey 0-4 (2tpf), Aaron Grant 0-2, Liam Leahy 0-1, Oisin Brennan 0-1, Adam Lynch 0-1, Graham Reilly 0-1	Report	Pts: Cian Commons 1-6 (3f, 1tpf), Alan Mulvany 1-2, Eoin Finnegan 0-3 (1tpf), Woodley Nicholson 0-1, Dylan Keating 0-1	Referee: Derek Ryan

3 August 2025 Round 1	Ballinabrackey	1-11 (14) – (21) 2-15	Ratoath	Navan
12:00		(HT: 0-8 - 1-6)		Venue: Pairc Tailteann
	Pts: Danny Quinn 0-8 (6f, 1tp), David Carroll 1-0, Dean Pluck 0-2 (tpf), Sean Kavanagh 0-1		Pts: Daithi McGowan 0-7 (2f, 1tp, 1tpf, 1'45), Eamon Wallace 1-1 (1pen), Cian Rogers 1-0, Gavin McGowan 0-2 (tp), Bryan McMahon 0-2 (1f), Ben Wyer 0-1, Cian Crawford 0-1, Glen O'Reilly 0-1	Referee: Kieran Olwell

==== Round 2 ====
16 August 2025 Round 2	Ballinabrackey	1-19 (22) – (13) 1-10	St. Colmcille's	Walterstown
18:00		(HT: 1-11 - 1-4)
	Pts: Damien Carroll 0-10 (4f), Sean Kavanagh 1-1, David Carroll 0-3, Chris O'Connor 0-2, Dean Pluck 0-1 ('45), Mark Coffey 0-1, Niall Smullen 0-1	Report	Pts: David Bell 0-4 (2f), Luke Hannon 1-0, Andrew Beakey 0-2 (1f, 1'45), Graham Reilly 0-2, Stephen Breen 0-1, James McCullen 0-1	Referee: Patrick Coyle

17 August 2025 Round 2	Seneschalstown	0-16 (16) – (16) 1-13	Ratoath	Navan
14:00		(HT: 0-4 - 0-6)		Venue: Pairc Tailteann
	Pts: Cian Commons 0-11 (3f, 3tpf), Bryan Clarke 0-3 (1tpf), Eoin Finnegan 0-2 (1f)	Report	Pts: Daithi McGowan 0-6 (1f, 1tp), Cian Rogers 1-0, Eamonn Wallace 0-3, Bryan McMahon 0-2, Ronan Byrne 0-1, Cian O'Brien 0-1	Referee: Cormac Reilly

==== Round 3 ====
30 August 2025 Round 3	Seneschalstown	0-10 (10) – (20) 1-17	Ballinabrackey	Dunganny
18:00		(HT: 0-6 - 0-13)
	Pts: Bryan Clarke 0-5 (3f, 1tpf), Ronan Coneely 0-1, Cian Commons 0-1, Eoin Finnegan 0-1 (f), Cathal Finnegan 0-1, Dylan Keating 0-1	Report	Pts: Danny Quinn 0-7 (3f, 1tp), Sean Kavanagh 1-1, Dean Pluck 0-3 (1tpf, 1f), Damien Carroll 0-2 (tp), Barry Thompson 0-2, Chris O'Connor 0-1, Niall Smullen 0-1	Referee: Keith Sheerin

30 August 2025 Round 3	Ratoath	4-20 (32) – (10) 0-10	St. Colmcille's	Stamullen
18:00		(HT: 4-10 - 0-4)
	Pts: Bryan McMahon 0-7 (4f), Daithi McGowan 1-3, Cian Rogers 1-2, Jack Flynn 0-4 (2tp), Cian O'Brien 1-0, Ronan Byrne 1-0, Eamon Wallace 0-1, Gavin McGowan 0-1, Bobby O'Brien 0-1, Glen O'Reilly 0-1		Pts: David Bell 0-6 (4f), Andrew Beakey 0-2 (1tpf), Stephen Breen 0-1, Evan Breen 0-1	Referee: Robert Purfield

=== Group C ===
Advance to knockout stage Advance to relegation play-off

Team	Matches				Score			Pts
Team	Pld	W	D	L	For	Against	Diff	Pts
Trim	3	3	0	0	60	49	+11	6
Dunshaughlin	3	1	0	2	60	52	+8	2
Rathkenny	3	1	0	2	57	56	+1	2
Meath Hill	3	1	0	2	46	66	-20	2

==== Round 1 ====
2 August 2025 Round 1	Rathkenny	2-16 (22) – (19) 2-13	Dunshaughlin	Navan
18:00		(HT: 2-7 - 1-4)		Venue: Pairc Tailteann
	Pts: Keith Curtis 2-11 (4tpf), David Curtis 0-2 (1f), Luke Kealy 0-1, Christy Meade 0-1, Max McKenna 0-1	Report	Pts: Ruairi Kinsella 1-3 (1pen, 1f), Conor Gray 1-2 (1tp), Charlie O'Connor 0-2 (tp), Conor Duke 0-2, John McDonagh 0-2, Matthew Costello 0-1, Tadhg O Dushlaine 0-1	Referee: Kieran Olwell

3 August 2025 Round 1	Meath Hill	1-12 (15) – (24) 2-18	Trim	Simonstown
12:00		(HT: 1-5 - 2-11)
		Report		Referee: Patrick Coyle

==== Round 2 ====
14 August 2025 Round 2	Trim	2-15 (21) – (20) 2-14	Rathkenny	Dunganny
19:30		(HT: 0-8 - 1-5)
	Pts: Aaron Lynch 0-11 (2f, 2tp, 1'45), Eoin Sweeney 1-0, Sean Foley 1-0, James Murray 0-1, Daire Lynch 0-1, David Lernihan 0-1, Tom Carmody 0-1	Report	Pts: Keith Curtis 0-4 (4f), James O'Hare 1-0, Luke Kealy 1-0, Adam Byrne 0-2, Noah Jenkinson 0-2, Max McKenna 0-2, Donal Keoghan 0-2, David Curtis 0-1, Corbin Jenkinson 0-1	Referee: Patrick Coyle

15 August 2025 Round 2	Dunshaughlin	4-15 (27) – (15) 2-9	Meath Hill	Navan
19:30		(HT: 4-7 - 1-6)		Venue: Pairc Tailteann
	Pts: Ruairi Kinsella 2-2 (1f), Conor Duke 1-2, Aaron Murphy 0-5 (1f), Fursey Blake 1-0, Matthew Costello 0-3 (1tpf), Conor Gray 0-1, John McDonagh 0-1, Sean O'Neill 0-1	Report	Pts: Damien Turley 1-0, Cormac Sheehy 1-0, Pierce McGrath 0-3 (2f), Ryan Owens 0-2 (tp), Ryan Shekleton 0-2 (tp), James Mooney 0-1, Jack McMahon 0-1	Referee: Keith Sheerin

==== Round 3 ====
31 August 2025 Round 3	Meath Hill	1-13 (16) – (15) 1-12	Rathkenny	Navan
14:00		(HT: 1-7 - 1-4)		Venue: Pairc Tailteann
	Pts: Gary Breslin 0-8 (4f, 1tp), Jack McMahon 1-1, Cormac Sheehy 0-3 (1tp), Pierce McGrath 0-1	Report	Pts: Keith Curtis 1-11 (1f, 3tp), Noah Jenkinson 0-1	Referee: Cormac Reilly

31 August 2025 Round 3	Dunshaughlin	0-14 (14) – (15) 0-15	Trim	Dunsany
14:00		(HT: 0-5 - 0-7)
	Pts: Ruairi Kinsella 0-5 (1tp), Luke Mitchell 0-3 (1tp), Tadhg O Dushlaine 0-2 (tp), Adam Murphy 0-2, Conor Gray 0-1, Matthew Costello 0-1	Report	Pts: Aaron Lynch 0-7 (2f, 1'45), David Lernihan 0-3 (1tp), Conor Quigley 0-1, Ciaran Caulfield 0-1, Eoin O'Connor 0-1, Sean Foley 0-1, Tom Carmody 0-1	Referee: Kieran Olwell

=== Group D ===
Advance to knockout stage Advance to relegation play-off

Team	Matches				Score			Pts
Team	Pld	W	D	L	For	Against	Diff	Pts
Wolfe Tones	3	3	0	0	65	45	+20	6
Donaghmore/ Ashbourne	3	1	1	1	52	56	-4	3
Na Fianna	3	0	2	1	43	44	-1	2
Simonstown Gaels	3	0	1	2	43	58	-15	1

==== Round 1 ====
1 August 2025 Round 1	Donaghmore/Ashbourne	0-16 (16) – (16) 1-13	Na Fianna	Navan
19:30		(HT: 0-10 - 0-5)		Venue: Pairc Tailteann
		Report		Referee: Cormac Reilly

2 August 2025 Round 1	Simonstown Gaels	1-12 (15) – (25) 2-19	Wolfe Tones	Walterstown
17:00		(HT: 1-3 - 1-7)
		Report		Referee: Andrew Smith

==== Round 2 ====
16 August 2025 Round 2	Wolfe Tones	3-15 (24) – (15) 0-15	Donaghmore/Ashbourne	Navan
16:00		(HT: 2-10 - 0-10)		Venue: Pairc Tailteann
		Report		Referee: Stephan Cregan

16 August 2025 Round 2	Na Fianna	0-12 (12) – (12) 0-12	Simonstown Gaels	Navan
18:00		(HT: 0-4 - 0-9)		Venue: Pairc Tailteann
	Pts: Dan Queeney 0-6, Shane Walsh 0-3, Conor Downey 0-2, Jamie Queeney 0-1		Pts: Padraig McKeever 0-4, Eoghan Gough 0-2, Ben Hoey 0-2, Sean Tobin 0-2, Aaron Chinchilla 0-1, Aaron Farrelly 0-1	Referee: Kieran Olwell

==== Round 3 ====
30 August 2025 Round 3	Donaghmore/Ashbourne	2-15 (21) – (16) 0-16	Simonstown	Skryne
18:00		(HT: 1-7 - 0-10)
				Referee: Patrick Coyle

30 August 2025 Round 3	Wolfe Tones	0-16 (16) – (15) 2-9	Na Fianna	Navan
18:00		(HT: 0-7 - 1-6)		Venue: Pairc Tailteann
				Referee: Joseph Curran

== Knock-out stage ==
The 1st and 2nd placed teams in each group qualified for the quarter-finals. Quarter Final pairings were drawn with one group winner and one 2nd placed team in each pair with no repeat pairings from group stages. The draw for the Quarter-Finals took place on 1 September 2025. The draw for the Semi-Finals took place on 14 September 2025.

Quarter-Finals
Skryne	3-15
Ballinabrackey	1-20
Ratoath (AET)	2-18
Donaghmore/Ashbourne	0-17
Trim	0-11
Summerhill	2-15
Wolfe Tones	1-11
Dunshaughlin	1-14

Semi-Finals
Skryne	0-11
Ratoath	0-22
Summerhill (AET)	0-19
Dunshaughlin	0-18

Final
Ratoath	0-13
Summerhill	0-16

=== Quarter-finals ===
13 September 2025 Quarter-Final 1	Skryne	3-15 (24) – (23) 1-20	Ballinabrackey	Navan
15:00		(HT: 1-10 - 0-7)		Venue: Pairc Tailteann
	Pts: Darragh Campion 0-7 (3f, 1tpf), Shane Smyth 1-1, Daniel Fitzpatrick 1-0, John Finnerty 1-0, Niall Finnerty 0-3 (1tp), Conor Lenehan 0-2 (tp), Conor O'Brien 0-1, Billy Smyth 0-1	Report	Pts: Danny Quinn 0-7 (2f, 1tp), Niall Smullen 0-6 (3tp), Mark Coffey 1-0, Conor Ennis 0-2 (tp), Seamus Curry 0-2 (tpf), Damien Carroll 0-1, David Carroll 0-1, Sean Kavanagh 0-1	Referee: Kieran Olwell

13 September 2025 Quarter-Final 2	Trim	0-11 (11) – (21) 2-15	Summerhill	Navan
17:00		(HT: 0-6 - 0-7)		Venue: Pairc Tailteann
	Pts: Aaron Lynch 0-5 (3f, 1tp), Conor Quigley 0-1, David Lernihan 0-1, James Murray 0-1, Daire Lynch 0-1, Sean Foley 0-1, Sean Fitzgerald 0-1	Report	Pts: Eoghan Frayne 0-5 (5f), Conor Lyons 1-0, Adam Flanagan 1-0, Adam McDonnell 0-3 (1tp), Sam Muddiman 0-1 ('45), Ben Moran 0-1, Jamie O'Shea 0-1, Kevin Ryan 0-1, Conor Frayne 0-1, Liam Shaw 0-1, John Lavelle 0-1	Referee: Andrew Smith

14 September 2025 Quarter-Final 3	Wolfe Tones	1-11 (14) – (17) 1-14	Dunshaughlin	Navan
13:30		(HT: 1-5 - 0-9)		Venue: Pairc Tailteann
	Pts: Saran O Fionnagain 0-5, Tom Gavigan 1-1, Thomas O'Reilly 0-3 (1tpf, 1f), Conor Sheppard 0-1, Ross Gallagher 0-1	Report	Pts: Luke Mitchell 0-7 (6f), Conor Gray 1-0, Conor Duke 0-3 (1tpf), Matthew Costello 0-2, Adam Kealy 0-1, Ruairi Kinsella 0-1	Referee: Cormac Reilly

14 September 2025 Quarter-Final 4	Ratoath	2-18 (24) – (17) 0-17 (a.e.t.)	Donaghmore/Ashbourne	Navan
15:30		(HT: 0-3 - 0-8) (FT: 0-13 - 0-13)		Venue: Pairc Tailteann
	Pts: Cian Rogers 2-0, Glen O'Reilly 0-5 (2tp), Daithi McGowan 0-4 (2f), Bryan McMahon 0-3, Bobby O'Brien 0-2, Jack Flynn 0-1, Cian O'Brien 0-1, Ronan Byrne 0-1, Joey Wallace 0-1		Pts: Andrew Tormey 0-4 (2f), Zach Thornton 0-3 (2f), James Crumlish 0-2 (tp), Evan Quinn 0-2, Jamie Browne 0-2, Jack Doran 0-2 (tp), Darragh McGovern 0-1, Michael O'Sullivan 0-1	Referee: Keith Sheerin

=== Semi-finals ===
27 September 2025 Semi-Final 1	Skryne	0-11 (11) – (22) 0-22	Ratoath	Navan
16:00		(HT: 0-2 - 0-6)		Venue: Pairc Tailteann
	Pts: Niall Finnerty 0-5 (2f, 1tp), Darragh Campion 0-3 (1f, 1tp), Conor O'Brien 0-1, Billy Smyth 0-1, Conor Donohoe 0-1	Report	Pts: Jack Flynn 0-7 (1tp, 2tpf), Daithi McGowan 0-6 (1tp), Bryan McMahon 0-3, Liam Kelly 0-2 (tp), Cian Rogers 0-2, Glen O'Reilly 0-1, Ronan Byrne 0-1	Referee: Kieran Olwell

28 September 2025 Semi-Final 2	Dunshaughlin	0-18 (18) – (19) 0-19 (a.e.t.)	Summerhill	Navan
16:00		(HT: 0-9 - 0-5) (FT: 0-13 - 0-13)		Venue: Pairc Tailteann
	Pts: Ruairi Kinsella 0-5 (1tp, 1f), Aaron Murphy 0-3 (1tp), Luke Mitchell 0-3 (1tp, 1f), Matthew Costello 0-2 (tp), Tadhg O Dushlaine 0-2, Conor Duke 0-1, Adam Kealy 0-1, Niall Byrne 0-1	Report	Pts: Eoghan Frayne 0-8 (2f, 2tpf), Diarmuid McCabe 0-4 (1tp), David Larkin 0-3 (1tp), Adan McDonnell 0-2 (tp), Kevin Ryan 0-2	Referee: Patrick Coyle

=== Final ===
12 October 2025 Final	Ratoath	0-13 (13) – (16) 0-16	Summerhill	Navan
14:00		(HT: 0-4 - 0-10)		Venue: Pairc Tailteann
	Pts: Jack Flynn 0-3 (1'45, 1tpf), Daithi McGowan 0-3 (1f), Gavin McGowan 0-2 (tpf), Bobby O'Brien 0-2, Bryan McMahon 0-1, Eamonn Wallace 0-1, Cian Crawford 0-1	Report	Pts: Eoghan Frayne 0-8 (6f, 1tpf), Conor Frayne 0-4 (1tp), Liam Shaw 0-2 (tp), Diarmuid McCabe 0-1, Kevin Ryan 0-1	Referee: Keith Sheerin

== Relegation play-off ==
The relegation play-off consisted of the 4th placed finishers in each group. The winners of each playoff round retained their senior status while the outright loser was relegated to the Intermediate Championship for 2026. The draw for the relegation play-offs took place on 1st September 2025.

=== Relegation semi-finals ===
10 September 2025 Relegation Semi-Final 1	Gaeil Colmcille	1-10 (13) – (6) 1-3	St. Colmcille's	Seneschalstown
20:00		(HT: 1-7 - 0-2)
		Report		Referee: Patrick Coyle

12 September 2025 Relegation Semi-Final 2	Simonstown Gaels	1-14 (17) – (17) 1-14 (a.e.t.) (3-1 pen)	Meath Hill	Castletown
20:00		(HT: 0-2 - 1-4) (FT: 1-11 - 1-11)
		Report		Referee: David Coldrick
		Penalty shootout

=== Relegation final ===
26 September 2025 Relegation Final	St. Colmcille's	1-15 (18) – (7) 0-7	Meath Hill	Dunganny
20:00		(HT: 0-9 - 0-3)
	Pts: Andrew Beakey 0-6 (3tpf), Aaron Grant 1-1, Shaun Leonard 0-2, David Bell 0-2 (1f), Liam Stafford 0-1, Cormac O'Donoghue 0-1, Ben Brennan 0-1, Graham Reilly 0-1	Report	Pts: Gary Breslin 0-4 (3f), Mark Tully 0-1 (f), Jake Gillen 0-1, Pierce McGrath 0-1	Referee: Bernard Heaney
