= 2024 Meath Senior Football Championship =

Gaelic football league season

132nd Meath Senior Football Championship
Tournament details
- County: Meath
- Province: Leinster
- Year: 2024
- Trophy: Keegan Cup
- Sponsor: Fairyhouse Steel
- Date: 9 August - 20 October
- Teams: 16
- Defending champions: Summerhill

Winners
- Champions: Dunshaughlin

Runners-up
- Runners-up: Wolfe Tones
- Manager: Paddy Martin
- Captain: Shane Glynn

Promotion/Relegation
- Relegated team(s): Curraha

Other
- Matches played: 38
- Website: Meath GAA

The 2024 Meath Senior Football Championship was the 132nd edition of the Meath GAA's premier club Gaelic football tournament for senior clubs in County Meath, with 16 teams competing. The winner represented Meath in the Leinster Senior Football Championship. The championship started with a group stage and then progressed to a knock out stage.

Summerhill were the defending champions after they defeated Ratoath in the 2023 final to win their eighth S.F.C. and their first since 2013.

In 2023, Rathkenny defeated Duleek/Bellewstown to win the I.F.C, securing a place in the Senior Football Championship for the first time since 2019.

The draw for the group stages of the championship were made on 20 March 2024, with the games commencing on 9 August 2024.

On 20 October 2024, Dunshaughlin defeated Wolfe Tones 2-07 to 1-07 in the final. This was Dunshaughlin's fourth Meath Senior Championship in their history and their first time winning the competition since 2002. Ruairi Kinsella was awarded man of the match, scoring a goal and 2 points.

Curraha were relegated to the Meath Intermediate Football Championship after losing to Ballinabrackey in the relegation playoff final, ending their 7 year spell at the senior level.

== Championship structure ==
The 2024 Meath S.F.C. consisted of 16 teams drawn into four groups each containing four teams. The top two teams progressed to the quarter-finals, while the bottom two in each group contested the Relegation Quarter-Finals. The losers of each Relegation Quarter-Final then contested the Relegation Semi-Finals, the losers of which would play-off for the right to retain their senior status into 2025.

== Team changes ==
The following teams have changed division since the 2023 championship season.

=== To S.F.C. ===
Promoted from 2023 I.F.C.

- Rathkenny - (Intermediate Champions)

=== From S.F.C. ===
Relegated to 2024 I.F.C.

- Moynalvey

== Participating teams ==
The 16 teams that participated in the 2024 competition were:

Club	Location	Management	2023 Championship Position	2024 Championship Position
Ballinabrackey	Ballinabrackey	Trevor Bannon	Relegation Quarter-Finalist	Relegation Finalists
Curraha	Curraha	Damien Flanagan	Relegation Quarter-Finalist	Relegated
Donaghmore/Ashbourne	Ashbourne	Padraig Durkan & Shane Treanor	Semi-Finalist	Relegation Quarter-Finalist
Dunshaughlin	Dunshaughlin & Drumree	Richie Kealy	Quarter-Finalist	Champions
Gaeil Colmcille	Kells	Brendan Murphy	Relegation Quarter-Finalist	Relegation Quarter-Finalist
Na Fianna	Enfield & Baconstown	Shane Barrett	Relegation Semi-Finalist	Relegation Quarter-Finalist
Rathkenny	Rathkenny	Donal Curtis	I.F.C Champions	Relegation Semi-Finalist
Ratoath	Ratoath	Lar Norton	Runners Up	Quarter-Finalists
Seneschalstown	Kentstown & Yellow Furze	Stephen Kernan	Relegation Quarter-Finalist	Relegation Semi-Finalist
Simonstown Gaels	Navan	Joe Lyons	Quarter-Finalist	Quarter-Finalist
Skryne	Skryne & Tara	Mick O'Dowd	Relegation Finalist	Semi-Finalist
St. Colmcille's	Bettystown, Donacarney, Laytown & Mornington	Niall Ronan	Quarter-Finalist	Quarter-Finalist
St. Peter's Dunboyne	Dunboyne	Ger Robinson	Relegation Semi-Finalist	Semi-Finalist
Summerhill	Summerhill	Conor Gillespie	Champions	Quarter-Finalist
Trim	Trim	Paul Clarke	Quarter-Finalist	Relegation Quarter-Finalist
Wolfe Tones	Kilberry, Gibbstown, Oristown & Wilkinstown	Paddy Martin	Semi-Finalist	Runners Up

== Group stage ==
There were four groups of four teams called Group A, B, C and D. The 1st and 2nd placed teams in each group qualified for the quarter-finals. The 3rd and 4th placed team in each group proceeded to the Relegation Play-Off to determine which team would be relegated.

The draw for the group stages of the championship was made on 20 March 2024.

=== Group A ===
Team	Pld	W	L	D	PF	PA	PD	Pts
Dunshaughlin	3	3	0	0	59	36	+23	6
Summerhill	3	2	1	0	42	40	2	4
Donaghmore/Ashbourne	3	1	2	0	50	41	9	2
Ballinabrackey	3	0	3	0	22	56	-34	0

Round 1

- Summerhill 0-10, 0-8 Ballinabrackey, Trim, 11/8/2024
- Dunshaughlin 1-13, 1-12 Donaghmore/Ashbourne, Ratoath, 10/8/24

Round 2

- Dunshaughlin 2-12, 2-10 Summerhill, Páirc Tailteann, 25/8/2024
- Donaghmore/Ashbourne 2-15, 1-6 Ballinabrackey, Pairc Tailteann, 23/8/2024

Round 3

- Summerhill 1-13, 1-11 Donaghmore/Ashbourne, Pairc Tailteann, 7/9/2024
- Dunshaughlin 4-13, 0-5 Ballinabrackey, Trim, 7/9/24

=== Group B ===
Team	Pld	W	L	D	PF	PA	PD	Pts
St. Peter's Dunboyne	3	3	0	0	45	25	+20	6
Wolfe Tones	3	2	1	0	35	27	+8	4
Gaeil Colmcille	3	1	2	0	34	33	+1	2
Curraha	3	0	3	0	27	56	-29	0

Round 1

- Curraha 0-9, 0-20 St. Peter's Dunboyne, Dunshaughlin, 9/8/2024
- Wolfe Tones 0-9, 0-8 Gaeil Colmcille, Páirc Tailteann, 9/8/2024

Round 2

- Wolfe Tones 0-7, 0-11 St. Peter's Dunboyne, Pairc Tailteann, 25/8/2024
- Curraha 1-7, 2-11 Gaeil Colmcille, Pairc Tailteann, 24/8/2024

Round 3

- Wolfe Tones 2-13, Curraha 0-8, Walterstown, 8/9/2024
- St. Peter's Dunboyne 2-8, 1-6 Gaeil Colmcille, Pairc Tailteann, 8/9/2024

=== Group C ===
Team	Pld	W	L	D	PF	PA	PD	Pts
Simonstown Gaels	3	3	0	0	52	40	+12	6
St. Colmcille's	3	2	1	0	49	37	+12	4
Na Fianna	3	1	2	0	39	44	-5	2
Seneschalstown	3	0	3	0	36	55	-19	0

Round 1

- Simonstown 1-15, 1-12 Na Fianna, Pairc Tailteann, 11/8/2024
- St. Colmcilles 3-12, 0-13 Seneschalstown, Stamullen, 10/8/2024

Round 2

- Na Fianna 0-7, 1-9 St. Colmcilles, Simonstown, 24/8/2024
- Seneschalstown 1-6, 2-11 Simonstown, Walterstown, 23/8/2024

Round 3

- Simonstown 1-14, 2-10 St. Colmcilles, Skryne, 5/9/2024
- Seneschalstown 1-11, 1-14 Na Fianna, Ashbourne, 5/9/2024

=== Group D ===
Team	Pld	W	L	D	PF	PA	PD	Pts
Skryne	3	2	0	1	40	31	+9	5
Ratoath	3	2	1	0	71	36	+35	4
Trim	3	1	2	0	39	50	-11	2
Rathkenny	3	0	2	1	35	68	-33	1

Round 1

- Trim 1-14, 2-10 Rathkenny, Páirc Tailteann, 10/8/2024
- Ratoath 0-12, 1-11 Skryne, Ashbourne, 11/8/2024

Round 2

- Ratoath 0-16, 0-11 Trim, Summerhill, 24/8/2024
- Rathkenny 0-8, 0-8 Skryne, Simonstown, 24/8/2024

Round 3

- Ratoath 8-19, 0-11 Rathkenny, Páirc Tailteann, 8/9/2024
- Skryne 1-16, 1-8 Trim, Dunsany, 8/9/2024

== Knock-out stage ==
The 1st and 2nd placed teams in each group qualified for the quarter-finals. Quarter Final pairings were drawn with one group winner and one 2nd placed team in each pair with no repeat pairings from group stages. Semi Final pairings were determined by an open draw. The draw for the Quarter-finals took place on the 8 September 2024 and the draw for the Semi-Finals took place on 22 September 2024.

Quarter-Finals
Simonstown Gaels	1-7
Wolfe Tones	0-12
Skryne	3-12
St. Colmcille	2-08
Dunshauglin	4-09
Ratoath	0-15
St. Peter's Dunboyne	1-15
Summerhill	0-14

Semi-Finals
Wolfe Tones	4-11
Skryne	0-17
Dunshauglin	0-11
St. Peter's Dunboyne	0-10

Final
Wolfe Tones	1-07
Dunshauglin	2-07

=== Quarter-finals ===
21 September 2024 Quarter-Final 1	Simonstown	1-7 (10) – (12) 0-12	Wolfe Tones	Navan
15:00 IST (UTC+1)		(HT: 1-02 - 0-6)		Venue: Pairc Tailteann
		Report		Referee: David Gough

21 September 2024 Quarter-Final 2	Dunshaughlin	4-9 (21) – (15) 0-15	Ratoath	Navan
17:00 IST (UTC+1)		(HT: 2-04 - 0-4)		Venue: Pairc Tailteann
		Report		Referee: David Coldrick

22 September 2024 Quarter-Final 3	Skryne	3-12 (21) – (14) 2-8	St. Colmcille	Navan
14:00 IST (UTC+1)		(HT: 0-8 - 0-3)		Venue: Pairc Tailteann
		Report		Referee: Keith Sheerin

22 September 2024 Quarter-Final 4	St. Peter's Dunboyne	1-15 (18) – (14) 0-14	Summerhill	Navan
16:00 IST (UTC+1)				Venue: Pairc Tailteann
		Report		Referee: Andrew Smith

=== Semi-finals ===
5 October 2024 Semi-Final 1	Dunshaughlin	0-11 (11) – (10) 0-10	St. Peter's Dunboyne	Navan
16:00 IST (UTC+1)		(HT: 0-6 - 0-6)		Venue: Pairc Tailteann
		Report		Referee: David Gough

6 October 2024 Semi-Final 2	Wolfe Tones	4-11 (23) – (17) 0-17 (a.e.t.)	Skryne	Navan
16:00 IST (UTC+1)		(HT: 0-5 - 0-6) (FT: 2-8 - 0-14)		Venue: Pairc Tailteann
		Report		Referee: Cormac Reilly

=== Final ===
20 October 2024 Final	Dunshaughlin	2-7 (13) – (11) 1-8	Wolfe Tones	Navan
15:00 IST (UTC+1)		(HT: 1-3 - 0-3)		Venue: Pairc Tailteann
	Pts: Ruairi Kinsella 1-2 (1f), Matthew Costello 1-2 (2f), Luke Mitchell 0-1 (f), Conor Duke 0-1, Fursey Blake 0-1	Report	Pts: Thomas O'Reilly 0-4 (4f), Cian Ward 1-0, Saran O Fionnagain 0-3, Dan O'Neill 0-1	Referee: Patrick Coyle

== Relegation play-off ==
The relegation play-off consisted of the 3rd and 4th-placed finishers in each group. The winners of each playoff round retained their senior status while the outright loser was relegated to the Intermediate championship for 2025.

=== Relegation quarter-finals ===
19 September 2024 Relegation Quarter-Final 1	Trim	2-13 (19) – (14) 1-11	Curraha	Batterstown
20:00 IST (UTC+1)		(HT: 0-9 - 1-3)
		Report		Referee: Robbie Barrett

20 September 2024 Relegation Quarter-Final 2	Donaghmore/Ashbourne	4-11 (23) – (13) 2-7	Seneschalstown	Duleek
20:00 IST (UTC+1)		(HT: 2-8 - 1-4)
		Report		Referee: Cormac Reilly

22 September 2024 Relegation Quarter-Final 3	Gaeil Colmcille	2-16 (22) – (19) 1-16	Ballinabrackey	Longwood
11:00 IST (UTC+1)
		Report		Referee: Patrick Coyle

22 September 2024 Relegation Quarter-Final 4	Na Fianna	2-6 (12) – (11) 1-8	Rathkenny	Bective
11:00 IST (UTC+1)		(HT: 2-2 - 1-3)
		Report		Referee: Padraic Coyle

=== Relegation semi-finals ===
3 October 2024 Relegation Semi-Final 1	Rathkenny	0-18 (18) – (11) 0-11	Ballinabrackey	Cortown
20:00 IST (UTC+1)		(HT: 0-7 - 0-5)
		Report		Referee: Cormac Reilly

4 October 2024 Relegation Semi-Final 2	Seneschalstown	0-12 (12) – (12) 0-12 (a.e.t.) (3 - 1 pen)	Curraha	Skryne
20:00 IST (UTC+1)		(HT: 0-7 - 0-7) (FT: 0-10 - 0-10)
		Report		Referee: Cormac Reilly
		Penalty shootout

=== Relegation Final ===
19 October 2024 Relegation Final	Ballinabrackey	1-21 (24) – (24) 2-18 (a.e.t.) (4 - 2 pen)	Curraha	Dunganny
19:00 IST (UTC+1)		(HT: 0-6 - 0-5) (FT: 1-16 - 2-13)
		Report		Referee: Kieran Olwell
		Penalty shootout
