= 2025 Meath Intermediate Football Championship =

Gaelic Football Intermediate Championship

99th Meath Intermediate Football Championship
Tournament details
- County: Meath
- Province: Leinster
- Year: 2025
- Trophy: Mattie McDonnell Cup
- Sponsor: Meade Potato
- Date: 1 August 2025 - 11 October 2025
- Teams: 16
- Defending champions: Meath Hill

Winners
- Champions: Kilbride (2nd win)
- Manager: Anthony Moyles
- Captain: Timmy Farrell

Runners-up
- Runners-up: Castletown
- Manager: Justin Carry Lynch

Promotion/Relegation
- Promoted team(s): Kilbride
- Relegated team(s): Curraha

Other
- Matches played: 34
- Website: Meath GAA

The 2025 Meath Intermediate Football Championship was the 99th edition of the Meath GAA's premier club Gaelic football tournament for Intermediate graded teams in County Meath, Ireland. The tournament consisted of 16 teams and started with a group stage before progressing to a knock out stage. The winner will represent Meath in the Leinster Intermediate Club Football Championship.

Meath Hill were the 2024 Meath Intermediate Football Champions after they defeated Navan O'Mahonys 0-16 to 0-14 in the final. As a result, for the first time in Meath Hills history they will play in the Meath Senior Football Championship in 2025.

Curraha were relegated from the Senior Football Championship in 2024, ending their seven year long spell within the Senior Championship. Dunsany were promoted to the I.F.C. after beating St. Vincents in the 2024 Meath Junior Football Championship. Nobber were relegated to the 2025 Meath Junior Football Championship.

The draw for the group stages of the championship took place on 22 January 2025, with the games commencing on 1 August 2025.

After being relegated from the Meath Senior Football Championship the previous year, Curraha were relegated to the Meath Junior Football Championship after losing to Navan O'Mahonys in the relegation playoff final.

On 11 October 2025, Kilbride won the Meath Intermediate Football Championship for the 2nd time after defeating Castletown 0-20 to 1-16 in the final. It will be the first time since 1978 that Kilbride will be in the Meath Senior Football Championship.

== Championship Structure ==
The 2025 I.F.C. consisted of 16 teams drawn into four groups each containing four teams. The top two teams progressed to the quarter-finals, while the bottom team in each group contested the Relegation Semi-Finals. The losers of the Relegation Semi-Finals would play-off for the right to retain their intermediate status into 2026.

== Team changes ==
The following teams have changed division since the 2024 championship season.

=== From I.F.C. ===
Promoted to 2025 S.F.C.

- Meath Hill - (Intermediate Champions)

Relegated to 2025 Meath Junior Football Championship

- Nobber

=== To I.F.C. ===
Relegated from 2024 S.F.C.

- Curraha

Promoted from 2024 J.F.C.

- Dunsany - (Junior 'A' Champions)

== Participating teams ==
The teams taking part in the 2025 Meath Intermediate Football Championship are:

Club	Location	Management	2024 Championship Position	2025 Championship Position
Ballivor	Ballivor	Kevin Dowd	Semi-Finalist	Relegation Semi-Finalist
Bective	Navan	David Nolan	Quarter-Finalist	Relegation Semi-Finalist
Blackhall Gaels	Batterstown & Kilcloon	William Farrelly	Relegation Finalist	Non-Qualifier
Castletown	Castletown-Kilpatrick	Justin Carry Lynch	Semi-Finalist	Runners-Up
Curraha	Curraha	Gavin Coyle	Relegated from 2024 SFC	Relegated to 2026 JFC
Drumbaragh Emmets	Drumbaragh, Kells	Rob Wall	Relegation Semi-Finalist	Quarter-Finalist
Dunsany	Dunsany	Kevin Cahill	2024 JFC Champions	Quarter-Finalist
Duleek/Bellewstown	Duleek & Bellewstown	Kevin Smith/David Crosby	Relegation Quarter-Finalist	Non-Qualifier
Kilbride	Kilbride	Anthony Moyles	Quarter-Finalist	Champions
Longwood	Longwood	Aaron Ennis	Relegation Quarter-Finalist	Non-Qualifier
Moynalvey	Moynalvey & Kiltale	Barry O'Keefe	Quarter-Finalist	Semi-Finalist
Navan O'Mahonys	Navan	Rory Maguire & Damien Moran	Runners-Up	Relegation Finalist
Oldcastle	Oldcastle	Joe Sheridan	Quarter-Finalist	Quarter-Finalist
St. Michael's	Carlanstown & Kilbeg	Ciaran Conlon	Relegation Quarter-Finalist	Semi-Finalist
St. Patrick's	Stamullen	Cormac Reynolds & Martin Byrne	Relegation Quarter-Finalist	Quarter-Finalist
Walterstown	Johnstown, Navan	Andy McGuinness	Relegation Semi-Finalist	Non-Qualifier

== Group stage ==
There were four groups of four teams called Group A, B, C and D. The 1st and 2nd placed teams in each group qualified for the quarter-finals. The 4th placed team in each group proceeded to the Relegation Play-Off to determine which team would be relegated.

The draws for the group stage of the championship were made on 22 January 2025.

=== Group A ===
Advance to knockout stage Advance to relegation play-off

Team	Matches				Score			Pts
Team	Pld	W	D	L	For	Against	Diff	Pts
Moynalvey	3	3	0	0	66	43	+23	6
St. Patrick's	3	2	0	1	50	47	+3	4
Walterstown	3	1	0	2	45	46	-1	2
Ballivor	3	0	0	3	47	72	-25	0

==== Round 1 ====
3 August 2025 Round 1	St. Patrick's	1-16 (19) – (11) 2-5	Walterstown	Ashbourne
11:00
				Referee: Martin Dawson

3 August 2025 Round 1	Ballivor	1-19 (22) – (28) 3-19	Moynalvey	Summerhill
12:00		(HT: 1-9 - 2-9)
		Report		Referee: Stephan Cregan

==== Round 2 ====
14 August 2025 Round 2	Moynalvey	1-14 (17) – (9) 0-9	Walterstown	Dunshaughlin
19:30		(HT: 1-4 - 0-5)
		Report		Referee: Andrew Smith

16 August 2025 Round 2	St. Patrick's	0-19 (19) – (15) 1-12	Ballivor	Dunsany
16:00
		Report		Referee: Ciaran Flynn

==== Round 3 ====
30 August 2025 Round 3	Moynalvey	2-15 (21) – (12) 1-9	St. Patrick's	Navan
16:00		(HT: 1-12 - 1-3)		Venue: Pairc Tailteann
		Report		Referee: Cormac Reilly

30 August 2025 Round 3	Walterstown	2-19 (25) – (10) 0-10	Ballivor	Summerhill
16:00
				Referee: Owen Ganly

=== Group B ===
Advance to knockout stage Advance to relegation play-off

Team	Matches				Score			Pts
Team	Pld	W	D	L	For	Against	Diff	Pts
Oldcastle	3	2	1	0	68	46	+22	6
Drumbaragh Emmets	3	2	0	1	59	56	+3	5
Longwood	3	1	1	1	66	60	+6	3
Curraha	3	0	0	3	44	75	-31	0

==== Round 1 ====
2 August 2025 Round 1	Drumbaragh Emmets	1-15 (18) – (22) 0-22	Oldcastle	Navan
16:00		(HT: 0-7 - 0-11)		Venue: Pairc Tailteann
		Report		Referee: Joseph Curran

3 August 2025 Round 1	Curraha	3-9 (18) – (30) 3-21	Longwood	Dunganny
16:00		(HT: 2-5 - 0-10)
		Report		Referee: Robert Purfield

==== Round 2 ====
14 August 2025 Round 2	Oldcastle	4-18 (30) – (12) 0-12	Curraha	Navan
16:00		(HT: 2-6 - 0-8)		Venue: Pairc Tailteann
		Report		Referee: Robert Purfield

17 August 2025 Round 2	Longwood	1-17 (20) – (26) 3-17	Drumbaragh Emmets	Boardsmill
16:00		(HT: 1-9 - 1-6)
		Report		Referee: Peter O'Halloran

==== Round 3 ====
28 August 2025 Round 3	Drumbaragh Emmets	0-15 (15) – (14) 1-11	Curraha	Castletown
20:00
				Referee: Stephan Cregan

28 August 2025 Round 3	Longwood	1-13 (16) – (16) 0-16	Oldcastle	Navan
20:00		(HT: 0-6 - 0-7)
		Report		Referee: Paul Mooney

=== Group C ===
Advance to knockout stage Advance to relegation play-off

Team	Matches				Score			Pts
Team	Pld	W	D	L	For	Against	Diff	Pts
Castletown	3	2	1	0	63	35	+28	5
St. Michael's	3	1	1	1	49	61	-12	3
Duleek/Bellewstown	3	1	0	2	41	66	-25	2
Navan O'Mahonys	3	1	0	2	58	49	+9	2

==== Round 1 ====
1 August 2025 Round 1	Navan O'Mahonys	1-14 (17) – (18) 0-18	Duleek/Bellewstown	Walterstown
19:30		(HT: 1-7 - 0-11)
		Report		Referee: Robbie Barrett

2 August 2025 Round 1	Castletown	1-13 (16) – (16) 2-10	St. Michaels	Moynalty
19:30		(HT: 1-6 - 1-3)
		Report		Referee: Patrick Clarke

==== Round 2 ====
16 August 2025 Round 2	Duleek/Bellewstown	0-8 (8) – (29) 5-14	Castletown	Seneschalstown
18:00		(HT: 0-3 - 2-9)
		Report		Referee: Robert Purfield

17 August 2025 Round 2	St. Michael's	0-13 (13) – (30) 4-18	Navan O'Mahonys	Bohermeen
14:00		(HT: 0-8 - 3-5)
		Report		Referee: Paul Mooney

==== Round 3 ====
29 August 2025 Round 3	Navan O'Mahonys	0-11 (11) – (18) 2-12	Castletown	Simonstown
20:00		(HT: 0-5 - 1-4)
		Report		Referee: Cormac Reilly

29 August 2025 Round 3	St. Michael's	1-17 (20) – (15) 2-9	Duleek/Bellewstown	Ashbourne
20:00
				Referee: Kieran Olwell

=== Group D ===
Advance to knockout stage Advance to relegation play-off

Team	Matches				Score			Pts
Team	Pld	W	D	L	For	Against	Diff	Pts
Kilbride	3	3	0	0	50	30	+20	6
Dunsany	3	1	1	1	43	30	+13	3
Blackhall Gaels	3	1	1	1	35	45	-10	3
Bective	3	0	0	3	31	54	-23	0

==== Round 1 ====
1 August 2025 Round 1	Blackhall Gaels	2-9 (15) – (13) 2-7	Bective	Trim
19:30		(HT: 1-5 - 0-6)
		Report		Referee: Owen Ganly

1 August 2025 Round 1	Dunsany	0-9 (9) – (13) 0-13	Kilbride	Dunshaughlin
19:30
				Referee: Keith Sheerin

==== Round 2 ====
16 August 2025 Round 2	Kilbride	2-15 (21) – (9) 0-9	Blackhall Gaels	Dunboyne
16:00		(HT: 1-11 - 0-3)
		Report		Referee: Liam Reddy

17 August 2025 Round 2	Bective	0-6 (6) – (23) 4-11	Dunsany	Skryne
16:00
				Referee: Martin Dawson

==== Round 3 ====
30 August 2025 Round 3	Blackhall Gaels	0-11 (11) – (11) 2-5	Dunsany	Dunshaughlin
16:00
				Referee: Stephan Cregan

30 August 2025 Round 3	Kilbride	0-16 (16) – (12) 0-12	Bective	Ratoath
16:00		(HT: 0-8 - 0-2)
		Report		Referee: Peter O'Halloran

== Knock-out stage ==
The 1st and 2nd placed teams in each group qualified for the quarter-finals. Quarter-Final pairings were drawn with one group winner and one 2nd placed team in each pair with no repeat pairings from group stages. Semi-Final pairings were determined by an open draw. The draw for the quarter-finals took place on 1st September 2025. The draw for the semi-finals took place on 14 September 2025.

=== Brackets ===
Quarter-Finals
Kilbride (AET)	2-14
St. Patrick's	1-16
Oldcastle	2-10
St. Michael's	1-15
Moynalvey	4-21
Dunsany	0-14
Castletown	3-18
Drumbaragh Emmets	2-13

Semi-Finals
Kilbride	3-26
St. Michael's	0-13
Moynalvey	1-14
Castletown	0-26

Final
Kilbride	0-20
Castletown	1-16

=== Quarter-finals ===
12 September 2025 Quarter-Final 1	Kilbride	2-14 (20) – (19) 1-16 (a.e.t.)	St. Patrick's	Ashbourne
20:00		(HT: 0-7 - 0-5) (FT: 2-12 - 1-15)
	Pts: David O'Leary 0-5 (1f), Josh Hartford 0-4 (3f), Adam Malone 1-0, Finn White 1-0, Andrew McWeeney 0-2, Conor McWeeney 0-2, Mark Dempsey 0-1		Pts: Jamie Murphy 0-9 (3tp, 1f, 1'45), Ben Sullivan 1-2, Sean Emmanuel 0-2, Shane Dowling 0-1, Donal Landy 0-1, Eoghan O'Fuaruisge 0-1	Referee: Derek Ryan

13 September 2025 Quarter-Final 2	Oldcastle	2-10 (16) – (18) 1-15	St. Michael's	Ballinlough
19:30		(HT: 1-7 - 1-6)
	Pts: Colin Hawdon 1-2, Lee Healy 1-0, Paul Hennessey 0-2, Oran Mulvanny 0-2 (tp), Rory Crawley 0-1, Steven Lawless 0-1, Pearse Sheridan 0-1, Paddy Rahill 0-1		Pts: Gearoid O'Malley 0-9 (1tpf, 5f), Shane McDonnell 0-4, Matthew Halpin 1-0, Kuba Bidzinski 0-1, Ciaran Lynch 0-1	Referee: Stephan Cregan

14 September 2025 Quarter-Final 3	Moynalvey	4-21 (33) – (14) 0-14	Dunsany	Dunganny
12:00		(HT: 2-17 - 0-3)
		Report		Referee: Liam Reddy

14 September 2025 Quarter-Final 4	Castletown	3-18 (27) – (19) 2-13	Drumbaragh Emmets	Moynalty
18:00		(HT: 3-11 - 0-2)
	Pts: Kevin Ross 0-4, Darragh Weldon 2-1, Adam Matthews 1-2, Declan Cribbin 0-1, Rian McConnell 0-6 (1tpf, 2f), Sean McKeown 0-1, William Bellew 0-2, Mark Kelly 0-1	Report	Pts: Liam Ward 0-8 (3tpf, 1f), William Carry 1-0, Hughie Corcoran 0-3 (1tpf, 1f), Jimmy Corcoran 0-3 (1tp)	Referee: Liam Reddy

=== Semi-finals ===
27 September 2025 Semi-Final 1	Castletown	0-26 (26) – (17) 1-14	Moynalvey	Navan
14:00		(HT: 0-16 - 0-9)		Venue: Pairc Tailteann
	Pts: Rian McConnell 0-10 (3tpf, 2f), Kevin Ross 0-6 (1tp, 2f), Declan Cribbin 0-3, Darren Finney 0-2, Killian Smyth 0-2, Killian Price 0-1, Darragh Weldon 0-1, Adam Matthews 0-1	Report	Pts: Cillian O'Sullivan 1-3 (2f), Adam Murphy 0-4 (2tpf), David McLoughlin 0-3 (1f), Hugh O'Sullivan 0-2, Mark O'Sullivan 0-1, David Regan 0-1	Referee: Derek Ryan

28 September 2025 Semi-Final 2	Kilbride	3-26 (35) – (13) 0-13	St. Michael's	Navan
14:00		(HT: 1-11 - 0-8)		Venue: Pairc Tailteann
	Pts: Conor McWeeney 2-5, Josh Hartford 1-7 (2tpf, 1f), David O'Leary 0-9 (1tpf, 3f), Andrew McWeeney 0-1, Timmy Farrell 0-1, Finn White 0-1, Adam Malone 0-1, Mark Dempsey 0-1	Report	Pts: Gearoid O'Malley 0-8 (2tpf, 3f), Declan Reilly 0-2, Shane McDonnell 0-1, David Lynch 0-1, Paddy Toibin 0-1	Referee: Andrew Smith

=== Final ===
11 October 2025 Final	Kilbride	0-20 (20) – (19) 1-16	Castletown	Navan
16:00		(HT: 0-11 - 1-7)		Venue: Pairc Tailteann
	Pts: David O'Leary 0-9 (1tp, 1tpf, 2f), Josh Hartford 0-5 (4f), Finn White 0-2, Conor McWeeney 0-2, Timmy Farrell 0-1, Andrew McWeeney 0-1	Report	Pts: Darren Finney 1-5, Darragh Weldon 0-2, Declan Cribbin 0-2, Kevin Ross 0-2, Rian McConnell 0-2 (2f), Darragh Kelly 0-2, Adam Matthews 0-1	Referee: Joseph Curran

== Relegation play-off ==
The relegation play-off consisted of the 4th placed finishers in each group. The winners of each playoff round retained their intermediate status while the outright loser was relegated to the Junior Championship for 2026. The draw for the relegation play-offs took place on 1st September 2025.

=== Relegation semi-finals ===
11 September 2025 Relegation Semi-Final 1	Navan O'Mahonys	1-9 (12) – (18) 1-15	Ballivor	Cortown
20:00		(HT: 0-5 - 0-7)
		Report		Referee: Joseph Curran

12 September 2025 Relegation Semi-Final 2	Bective	4-11 (23) – (17) 3-8	Curraha	Seneschalstown
20:00		(HT: 2-6 - 1-5)
		Report		Referee: Robbie Barrett

=== Relegation final ===
25 September 2025 Relegation Final	Navan O'Mahonys	0-15 (15) – (14) 0-14	Curraha	Dunganny
20:00		(HT: 0-8 - 0-7)
		Report		Referee: Ciaran Flynn
