= 2009 Meath Senior Football Championship =

Meath S.F.C
- Season: 2009
- Champions: Seneschalstown; 4th Senior Football Championship title
- Relegated: None
- Leinster SCFC: Seneschalstown (quarter finals); Portlaoise 3-12 Seneschalstown 1-6
- All-Ireland SCFC: N/A
- Winning Captain: Ciaran Macken (Seneschalstown)
- Man of the Match: Damien Sheridan (Seneschalstown)

The 2009 Meath Senior Football Championship was the 117th edition of the Meath GAA's premier club Gaelic football tournament for senior graded teams in County Meath, Ireland. The tournament consists of 16 teams, with the winner going on to represent Meath in the Leinster Senior Club Football Championship. The championship starts with a group stage and then progresses to a knock out stage.

Navan O'Mahonys were the defending champions after they defeated Summerhillin the previous years final.

St. Ultan's were promoted after claiming the 2008 Meath Intermediate Football Championship title, their first ever year in the senior grade.

On 26 September 2009, Seneschalstown claimed their 4th Senior Championship title when they defeated Wolfe Tones 2-8 to 1-8 after a replay. Ciaran Macken lifted the Keegan Cup for the Yellow Furze outfit while Damien Sheridan claimed the 'Man of the Match' award.

After much controversy no team was relegated from the senior grade. Walterstown lost their relegation tie after extra time to Rathkenny, but appealed for a re-fixture on the basis that extra time wasn't agreed beforehand. When Rathkenny refused to fulfill a re-fixture no team was relegated and the Intermediate Champions Oldcastle became the 17th team in the Senior Football Championship.

== Team changes ==
The following teams have changed division since the 2008 championship season.

=== To S.F.C. ===
Promoted from I.F.C.

- St. Ultan's - (Intermediate Champions)

=== From S.F.C. ===
Relegated to I.F.C.

- Kilmainhamwood

== Participating teams ==
The teams taking part in the 2009 Meath Senior Football Championship are:

Club	Location	2008 Championship Position	2009 Championship Position
Blackhall Gaels	Batterstown	Semi-finalist	Non Qualifier
Donaghmore/Ashbourne	Ashbourne	Quarter-finalist	Non Qualifier
Duleek/Bellewstown	Duleek	Quarter-finalist	Relegation Play Off
Dunshaughlin	Dunshaughlin	Quarter-finalist	Quarter-finalist
Navan O'Mahonys	Navan	Champions	Semi-finalist
Rathkenny	Rathkenny	Relegation Play Off	Relegation Play Off
Seneschalstown	Kentstown	Non Qualifier	Champions
Simonstown Gaels	Navan	Non Qualifier	Non Qualifier
Skryne	Skryne	Non Qualifier	Quarter-finalist
St Patricks	Stamullen	Non Qualifier	Quarter-finalist
St Peters Dunboyne	Dunboyne	Quarter-finalist	Quarter-finalist
St Ultans	Bohermeen	I.F.C Champions	Non Qualifier
Summerhill	Summerhill	Finalist	Semi-finalist
Trim	Trim	Non Qualifier	Non Qualifier
Walterstown	Navan	Relegation Play Off	Relegation Play Off
Wolfe Tones	Donaghpatrick	Semi-finalist	Finalist

== Group stage ==
There are 3 groups called Group A, B and C. The 3 top finishers in Group A and the top 2 finishers in Group B and C will qualify for the quarter-finals. Third place in Group B will play third place in Group C for a quarter finals place. The 3 teams that finish last in their groups will play in a round-robin relegation play off. Dunshaughlin defeated Blackhall Gaels in the preliminary quarter finals to qualify in 2009.

=== Group A ===
Team	Pld	W	L	D	PF	PA	PD	Pts
Navan O'Mahonys	5	3	1	1	67	45	+22	7
St Patricks	5	2	1	2	64	67	-3	6
Seneschalstown	5	2	2	1	70	63	+7	5
Simonstown Gaels	5	2	2	1	79	73	+6	5
Donaghmore Ashbourne	5	2	3	0	55	62	-7	4
Duleek/Bellewstown	5	1	3	1	55	80	-25	3

Round 1:

- Seneschalstown 0-11, 0-9 Navan O'Mahony's, Pairc Tailteann, 19/4/2009,
- Duleek/Bellewstown 1-9, 0-8 Donaghmore/Ashbourne, Pilltown, 19/4/2009,
- Simonstown Gaels 1-16, 1-8 St. Patrick's, Pairc Tailteann, 19/8/2009,

Round 2:

- Navan O'Mahony's 0-14, 0-7 Donaghmore/Ashbourne, Skryne, 3/5/2009,
- St. Patrick's 1-10, 1-8 Seneschalstown, Ashbourne, 1/5/2009,
- Simonstown Gaels 5-11, 1-9 Duleek/Bellewstown, Pairc Tailteann, 3/5/2009,

Round 3:

- Navan O'Mahonys 1-12, 0-8 Duleek/Bellewstown, Seneschalstown, 14/6/2009,
- St. Patrick's 2-13, 1-13 Donaghmore/Ashbourne, Donore, 17/6/2009,
- Simonstown Gaels 1-15, 1-15 Seneschalstown, Pairc Tailteann, 17/6/2009,

Round 4:

- Navan O'Mahony's 2-12, 0-8 Simonstown Gaels, Pairc Tailteann, 13/9/2009,
- St. Patrick's 0-10, 0-10 Duleek/Bellewstown, Ashbourne, 13/9/2009,
- Donaghmore/Ashbourne 1-7, 1-6 Seneschalstown, Ratoath, 13/9/2009,

Round 5:

- Donaghmore/Ashbourne 1-11, 0-8 Simonstown Gaels, Skryne, 19/9/2009,
- St. Patrick's 0-11, 0-11 Navan O'Mahonys, Donore, 20/9/2009,
- Seneschalstown 2-15, 0-13 Duleek/Bellewstown, Pairc Tailteann, 20/9/2009,

=== Group B ===
Team	Pld	W	L	D	PF	PA	PD	Pts
Skryne	4	4	0	0	61	41	+20	8
St Peters Dunboyne	4	2	1	1	56	51	+5	5
Blackhall Gaels	4	2	2	0	43	51	-8	4
St Ultans	4	1	2	1	58	54	+4	3
Walterstown	4	0	4	0	43	64	-21	0

Round 1:

- Blackhall Gaels 1-12, 1-10 St. Ultan's, Walterstown, 19/4/2009,
- Skryne 0-19, 1-8 St. Peter's Dunboyne, Dunshaughlin, 19/4/2009,
- Walterstown - Bye

Round 2:

- Skryne 2-10, 0-10 Walterstown, Pairc Tailteann, 3/5/2009,
- St. Ultan's 1-10, 2-7 St. Peter's Dunboyne, Seneschalstown, 3/5/2009,
- Blackhall Gaels - Bye

Round 3:

- Blackhall Gaels 1-9, 0-10 Walterstown, Dunshaughlin, 7/6/2009,
- Skryne 0-15, 1-8 St. Ultan's, Pairc Tailteann, 7/6/2009,
- St. Peter's Dunboyne - Bye

Round 4:

- Skryne 0-11, 1-6 Blackhall Gaels, Dunshaughlin, 5/9/2009,
- St. Peter's Dunboyne 1-12, 0-12 Walterstown, Pairc Tailteann, 6/9/2009,
- St. Ultan's - Bye

Round 5:

- St. Peter's Dunboyne 2-11, 0-7 Blackhall Gaels, Ashbourne, 18/9/2009,
- St. Ultan's 2-15, 0-11 Walterstown, Pairc Tailteann, 20/9/2009,
- Skryne - Bye

=== Group C ===
Team	Pld	W	L	D	PF	PA	PD	Pts
Wolfe Tones	4	4	0	0	63	41	+22	8
Summerhill	4	3	1	0	56	44	+12	6
Dunshaughlin	4	2	2	0	54	56	-2	4
Trim	4	1	3	0	60	54	+6	2
Rathkenny	4	0	4	0	28	66	-38	0

Round 1:

- Trim 0-16, 0-5 Rathkenny, Simonstown, 18/4/2009,
- Summerhill 0-11, 0-7 Dunshaughlin, Dunsany, 19/4/2009,
- Wolfe Tones - Bye

Round 2:

- Dunshaughlin 2-12, 2-4 Rathkenny, Simonstown, 3/5/2009,
- Wolfe Tones 1-12, 0-13 Trim, Pairc Tailteann, 4/5/2009,
- Summerhill - Bye

Round 3:

- Wolfe Tones 1-12, 1-9 Summerhill, Athboy, 14/6/2009,
- Dunshaughlin 1-15, 2-11 Trim, Pairc Tailteann, 14/6/2009,
- Rathkenny - Bye

Round 4:

- Wolfe Tones 0-15, 0-5 Rathkenny, Pairc Tailteann, 13/9/2009,
- Summerhill 2-10, 3-5 Trim, Pairc Tailteann, 13/9/2009,
- Dunshaughlin - Bye

Round 5:

- Wolfe Tones 2-12, 0-11 Dunshaughlin, Pairc Tailteann, 19/9/2009,
- Summerhill 1-14, 0-8 Rathkenny, Simonstown, 19/9/2009,
- Trim - Bye

== Knock-out Stages ==
=== Relegation Play Off ===
Team	Pld	W	L	D	PF	PA	PD	Pts
Rathkenny	0	0	0	0	0	0	0	0
Duleek/Bellewstown	0	0	0	0	0	0	0	0
Walterstown	0	0	0	0	0	0	0	0

In the relegation match between Rathkenny and Walterstown, Rathkenny won the original match (1-13 to 0-13 AET in Seneschalstown), but Walterstown appealed the result on the basis that the playing of extra-time had not been agreed beforehand. The Leinster Council ruled in their favour at a subsequent appeal, throwing the championship into chaos. Rathkenny wouldn't fulfill a re-fixture so that meant no teams were relegated in 2009, but instead an extra team was added to the Senior Football Championship, bringing the total number of teams from 16 to 17.

=== Finals ===
Preliminary Quarter-Final
Dunshaughlin	1-12
Blackhall Gaels	1-4

Quarter-Finals
Skryne	1-10
Seneschalstown	2-15
St Patricks	0-11
Summerhill	1-11
Dunshaughlin	2-6
Navan O'Mahonys	2-12
Wolfe Tones	1-18
St Peters Dunboyne	0-9

Semi-Finals
Seneschalstown	0-14
Summerhill	1-10
Navan O'Mahonys	0-8
Wolfe Tones	0-11

Final
Seneschalstown	2-8
Wolfe Tones	1-8

Preliminary Quarter-Finals

- Dunshaughlin 1-12, 1-4 Blackhall Gaels, Ashbourne, 25/9/2009,

Quarter-finals

- Wolfe Tones 1-18, 0-9 St Peters Dunboyne, Pairc Tailteann, 24/9/2009,
- Skryne 1-10, 2-15 Seneschalstown, Pairc Tailteann, 27/9/2009,
- St Patricks 0-11, 1-11 Summerhill, Pairc Tailteann, 27/9/2009,
- Navan O'Mahonys 2-12 ,2-6 Dunshaughlin, Pairc Tailteann, 4/10/2009,

Semi-finals

- Wolfe Tones 0-14, 0-14 Navan O'Mahonys, Pairc Tailteann, 11/10/2009, AET
- Seneschalstown 0-14 , 1-10 Summerhill, Pairc Tailteann, 11/10/2009,
- Wolfe Tones 0-11, 0-8 Navan O'Mahonys, Pairc Tailteann, 18/10/2009

Final

- Wolfe Tones 1-13, 1-13 Seneschalstown, Pairc Tailteann, 1/11/2009, AET

Final Replay

- Wolfe Tones 1-8, 2-8 Seneschalstown, Pairc Tailteann, 5/11/2009,
