= Cian Ward =

Meath Gaelic footballer

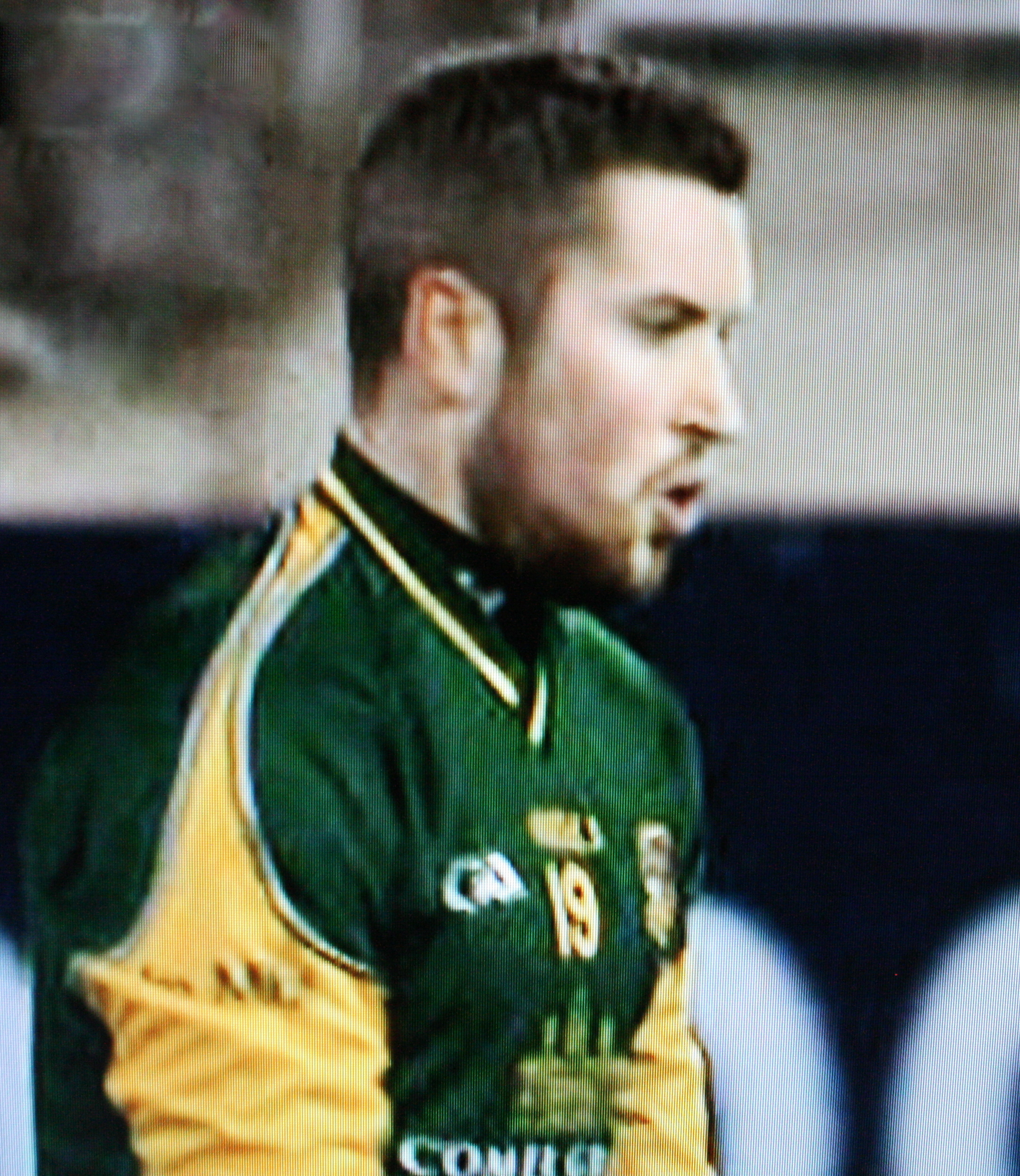

Personal information
- Native name: Cian Mac an Bhaird (Irish)
- Born: 1985 or 1986 (age 40–41) County Meath, Ireland
- Height: 6 ft 1 in (185 cm)

Sport
- Position: Full-forward
Club
- Years: Club
- 2000s–: Wolfe Tones
Club titles
- Meath titles: 2
- Leinster titles: 1
- All-Ireland Titles: 0
Inter-county
- Years: County
- 2006–2013: Meath
Inter-county titles
- Leinster titles: 1
- All-Irelands: 0

Cian Ward is an Irish Gaelic footballer who plays for Meath Senior Football Championship team Wolfe Tones and, formerly, for the Meath county team. He is noted for his ability at taking frees.

== Playing career ==
=== Club ===
Wolfe Tones went from the Meath Junior Football Championship to Meath Senior Football Championship winners in the space of four seasons in the early 21st-century, featuring Ward, whose emergence as one of Meath's "most exciting talents" coincided with this run, while 1996 All-Ireland Senior Football Championship-winning captain Tommy Dowd also joined the club around this time.

=== Inter-county ===
In the 2009 All-Ireland SFC, he was the third highest top scorer after Donegal's Michael Murphy and Kerry's Colm Cooper. Ward won his only Leinster SFC title with Meath, and scored four points, in the controversial 2010 decider. In 2011, Ward scored 4 goals and 3 points against Louth in front of a crowd 18,243 at Kingspan Breffni Park, to knock Louth out of the Championship. In 2013, Meath manager Mick O'Dowd dropped a number of players, including Ward, from the Meath panel.

== Honours ==
Inter-county

- Leinster Senior Football Championship: 1
  - 2010

Club

- Meath Senior Football Championship: 2
  - 2006, 2021
