= Ballinabrackey GAA =

Gaelic football club in County Meath, Ireland

- Baile na Breacaighe
- Founded: 1922
- County: Meath
- Colours: Green and Gold
- Grounds: Ballinabrackey

Playing kits
Standard colours

Ballinabrackey GAA is a Gaelic Athletic Association (GAA) club based in the village of Ballinabrackey in County Meath, Ireland. The club, which was founded in 1922, plays Gaelic football and competes in Meath GAA competitions. In 2010, the club won the Meath Junior Football Championship, going on to win the Leinster Junior Club Football Championship. They were defeated by Swanlinbar in the All-Ireland Junior Club Football Championship semi-final. As of 2026, the club was competing in the Meath Senior Football Championship.

== Honours ==
- Meath Intermediate Football Championship (1): 2020
- Meath Junior Football Championship (5): 1926, 1972, 1977, 1985, 2010
- Leinster Junior Club Football Championship (1): 2010
