= Donal Keogan =

Irish Gaelic footballer

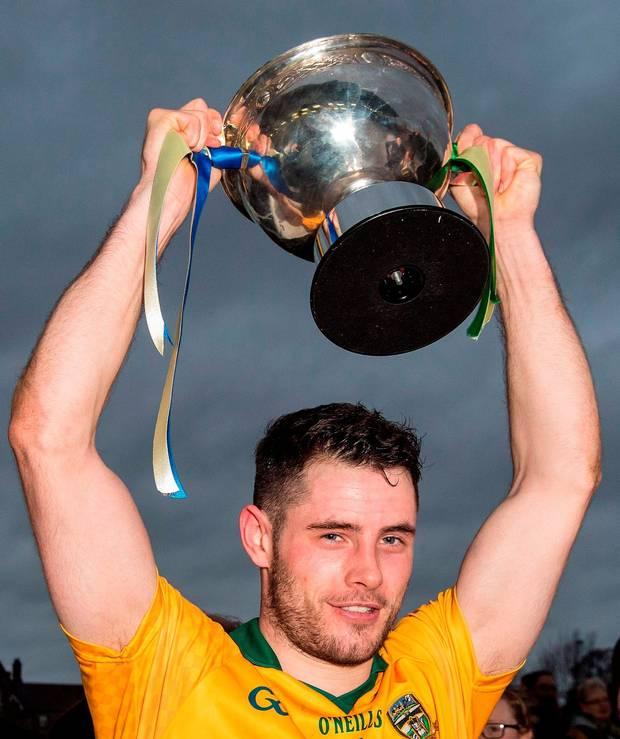
- Captain Donal Keogan Lifting the O'Byrne Cup in 2016

Personal information
- Native name: Domhnall Ó Ceogáin (Irish)
- Born: 13 April 1991 (age 35) Navan, Ireland
- Occupation: Scientist

Sport
- Sport: Gaelic football
- Position: Right wing back
Club
- Years: Club
- 2008-: Rathkenny
Inter-county
- Years: County
- 2012-: Meath

Donal Keogan (born 13 April 1991) is a Gaelic footballer who plays at senior level for the Meath county team and for his local club Rathkenny. Keogan was captain of the senior Meath football team from 2014 to 2024.In 2018, Keogan completed his PhD in Pharmaceutical and Medicinal chemistry from the Royal College of Surgeons in Ireland. Keogan was named Meath Footballer of the Year in 2019 and 2023.
