= Ballinabrackey =

Village in County Meath, Ireland

Ballinabrackey Buaile na Bréachmhaí
- Village
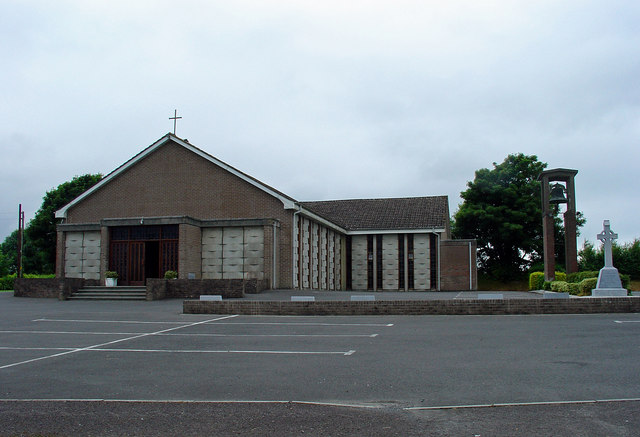
- Roman Catholic church in Ballinabrackey

- Location in Ireland
- Coordinates: 53°24′58″N 7°08′00″W
- Country: Ireland
- Province: Leinster
- County: County Meath
- Time zone: UTC+0 (WET)
  - Summer (DST): UTC-1 (IST (WEST))
- Irish grid reference: N576410

Ballinabrackey (Irish: Buaile na Bréachmhaí, meaning 'summer pasture of the wolf-plain') is a village in County Meath in Ireland. It is in the civil parish of Castlejordan.

The ecclesiastical parish of Ballinabrackey is located between Kinnegad and Edenderry, and spans parts of County Meath and County Offaly. The local parish church, which was built c. 1972, is in the Roman Catholic Diocese of Meath.

Ballinabrackey GAA, the local Gaelic Athletic Association club, won the 2020 Meath Intermediate Football Championship.
