= Wolfe Tones GAA (Meath) =

Gaelic games club in County Meath, Ireland

- Bhulf Tón CLG
- Founded: 1975
- County: Meath
- Colours: Yellow and Purple
- Grounds: Páirc Mhic Eoin
- Coordinates: 53°41′59″N 6°40′56″W

Playing kits
Standard colours

Senior Club Championships
	All Ireland	Leinster champions	Meath champions
Football:	0	0	3

Wolfe Tones GAA is a Gaelic Athletic Association club which comprises an amalgamation of the parishes of Oristown and Kilberry which are situated roughly halfway between the town of Navan and the town of Kells, in County Meath, Ireland. The club mainly plays football but also have a strong hurling side. It competes in Meath GAA competitions. The club won the Meath Senior Football Championship in 2006, 2021, and 2026.

== History ==
Named for the Irish revolutionary Theobald Wolfe Tone, the club was founded in 1975. Wolfe Tones went from the Meath Junior Football Championship to Meath Senior Football Championship winners in the space of four seasons in the early 21st-century, featuring Meath player Cian Ward, whose emergence as one of Meath's "most exciting talents" coincided with this run, while 1996 All-Ireland Senior Football Championship-winning captain Tommy Dowd also joined the club around this time.

== Grounds ==
Wolf Tones play at Páirc Mhic Eoin ('McKeown Park') in the Castletown Kilberry townland; south of Kilberry village and north of Navan Racecourse. It is named originally named Páirc an Phiarsaigh for Patrick Pearse, being renamed in 1990 for former club official Paul McKeown.

== Honours ==
- Meath Senior Football Championship: 3
  - 2006, 2021, 2026
- Meath Intermediate Hurling Championship: 3
  - 1992, 2002, 2020
- Meath Intermediate Football Championship: 1
  - 2004
- Meath Junior Hurling Championship: 2
  - 1989, 2010
- Leinster Special Junior Hurling Championship: 0
  - Runner-Up 2010
- Meath Junior Football Championship: 1
  - 2003
- Leinster Junior Club Football Championship: 1
  - 2003
- Meath Junior 2 Hurling Championship: 1
  - 1985
- Meath Junior B Football Championship: 2
  - 2007, 2015
- Comórtas Peile na Gaeltachta: 2
  - 2018, 2023

== Notable players ==
- Tommy Dowd
- Cian Ward

Preceded by St Peter's, Dunboyne	Meath Senior Football Champions; 2006	Succeeded by Seneschalstown
