= Seneschalstown GAA =

Gaelic games club in County Meath, Ireland

Seneschalstown
- Baile Sencaill
- Founded: 1932
- County: Meath
- Colours: Blue and Yellow
- Grounds: Fr. Tully Park

Playing kits
Home	Away

Senior Club Championships
	All Ireland	Leinster champions	Meath champions
Football:	0	0	4
Ladies' football:	0	1	12

Seneschalstown GAA is a small rural Gaelic Athletic Association (GAA) club from Beauparc/Kentstown parish in County Meath in Ireland. Its ground is situated about 6 miles east of Navan and 3 miles south of Slane. Founded in 1932, the club fields both Senior Men and Ladies' teams. It has had successes in several competitions and a number of players from the club have represented Meath's county teams.

== Honours ==
- Meath Senior Football Championship: 4
  - 1972, 1994, 2007, 2009
- Meath Senior Football League: 3
  - 1972, 1992, 2002
- Meath Senior Football Feis Cup: 7
  - 1971, 1972, 1992, 1994, 2000, 2007, 2008
- Meath Intermediate Football Championship: 2
  - 1940, 1967
- Meath Junior Football Championship: 1
  - 1936
- Meath Junior B Football Championship: 1
  - 1973, 1996, 2015
- Meath Junior D Football Championship: 1
  - 2003, 2015
- Meath Under-21 Football Championship:
  - 1970, 1971, 1972, 1992, 2012

== Ladies' honours ==
- Senior Club All-Ireland Runners up :
  - 2003
- Leinster Ladies' Senior Club Football Championship :
  - 2003
- Senior Championship : 13
  - 2000, 2001, 2002, 2003, 2005, 2006, 2007, 2008, 2009, 2011, 2012, 2013, 2014
- Senior League :
  - 1999, 2000, 2001, 2002, 2003, 2005, 2006, 2008, 2009
- Junior :
  - 1998
- Under-21 :
  - 1999

== Notable players ==
- Colm Coyle
- Graham Geraghty
- Joe Sheridan

Preceded by Navan O'Mahonys	Meath Senior Football Champions; 2009	Succeeded by Skryne
