= 2026 Meath Intermediate Football Championship =

100th Meath Intermediate Football Championship
Tournament details
- County: Meath
- Province: Leinster
- Year: 2026
- Trophy: Mattie McDonnell Cup
- Sponsor: Meade Potato
- Date: 9 August 2026 - 17 October 2026
- Teams: 16
- Defending champions: Kilbride

Winners
- Champions: Duleek/Bellewstown
- Manager: Anthony Malone
- Captain: Robin Clarke

Runners-up
- Runners-up: Navan O'Mahonys
- Manager: Darren Clarke

Promotion/Relegation
- Relegated team(s): Drumbaragh Emmets

Other
- Matches played: 34
- Website: Meath GAA

The 2026 Meath Intermediate Football Championship is the 100th edition of the Meath GAA's premier club Gaelic football tournament for Intermediate graded teams in County Meath, Ireland. The tournament consists of 16 teams and started with a knock-out stage. The winner will represent Meath in the Leinster Intermediate Club Football Championship.

Kilbride were the 2025 Meath Intermediate Football Champions after they defeated Castletown by 0–20 to 1–16 in the final. Kilbride will play at the senior level for the first time since 1978.

Despite winning the 2024 Intermediate Championship, Meath Hill were relegated back down after losing to St Colmcille's in the relegation play-off final. Clann na nGael were promoted to the I.F.C after beating St Vincent's in the 2024 Meath Junior Football Championship. Curraha faced back-to-back relegations after losing to Navan O'Mahonys.

The draw for the group stage was conducted on 19 January 2026, and the fixtures for those group stage games were finalised on 18 June 2026.

== Championship Structure ==
The 2026 Meath I.F.C consists of 16 teams drawn into four groups each containing four teams. The top two teams progress to the quarter-finals, while the bottom team in each group contests the relegation semi-finals. The losers of the relegation semi-finals would play-off for the right to retain their intermediate status into 2027.

== Team Changes ==
The following teams have changed division since the 2025 championship season:

=== From I.F.C. ===
Promoted to 2026 S.F.C.

- Kilbride - (Intermediate Champions)

Relegated to 2026 Meath Junior Football Championship

- Curraha

=== To I.F.C. ===
Relegated from 2025 S.F.C.

- Meath Hill

Promoted from 2025 J.F.C.

- Clann na nGael - (Junior 'A' Champions)

== Participating teams ==
The teams that are competing in the 2026 Meath I.F.C are:

Club	Location	Manager(s)	League	2025 Championship Position	2026 Championship Position	In Intermdiate championship since	Intermediate Championship Titles	Last Intermediate Championship Title
Ballivor	Ballivor	James McCaffrey	Division 3	Relegation Semi-Finalist	Relegation Semi-Finalist	2021	4	2002
Bective	Navan	Donal Curtis	Division 4	Relegation Semi-Finalist	Relegation Finalist	2017	0	—
Blackhall Gaels	Batterstown & Kilcloon	Gordon Ward	Division 3	Non-Qualifier	Relegation Semi-Finalist	2019	2	2001
Castletown	Castletown-Kilpatrick	Seán Barry	Division 3	Runners-Up	Quarter-Finalist	2023	3	1976
Clann na nGael	Athboy & Rathcairn	Niall McLoughlin	Division 2	J.F.C Champions	Quarter-Finalist	2026	0	—
Drumbaragh Emmets	Drumbaragh, Kells	Rob Wall	Division 4	Quarter-Finalist	Relegated to Junior	2014	0	—
Dunsany	Dunsany	Tom Shine	Division 3	Quarter-Finalist	Non-Qualifier	2025	0	—
Duleek/Bellewstown	Duleek & Bellewstown	Anthony Malone	Division 2	Non-Qualifier	Champions	2018	5	2005
Longwood	Longwood	Eoghan Kevlihan & Joe Corroon	Division 4	Non-Qualifier	Non-Qualifier	2020	2	2018
Meath Hill	Meath Hill	Paudie Finnegan	Division 2	Relegated from S.F.C	Quarter-Finalist	2026	1	2024
Moynalvey	Moynalvey & Kiltale	Barry O'Keefe	Division 1	Semi-Finalist	Quarter-Finalist	2024	2	2011
Navan O'Mahonys	Navan	Darren Clarke	Division 2	Relegation Finalist	Runners-Up	2023	2	2003
Oldcastle	Oldcastle	Joe Sheridan	Division 2	Quarter-Finalist	Non-Qualifier	2015	2	2009
St Michael's	Carlanstown & Kilbeg	Paul Grier	Division 3	Semi-Finalist	Non-Qualifier	2006	1	1989
St Patrick's	Stamullen	Colm Nally	Division 2	Quarter-Finalist	Semi-Finalist	2020	3	2000
Walterstown	Navan	Andy McGuinness	Division 2	Non-Qualifier	Semi-Finalist	2016	1	1964

== Group Stage ==
There are four groups of four teams called Group A, B, C and D. The 1st and 2nd placed teams in each group qualified for the quarter-finals. The 4th placed teams in each group proceed to the relegation play-off to determine which team will be relegated.

The draw for the group stage was made on 19 January 2026, and the fixtures for those group stage games were finalised on 18 June 2026.

=== Group A ===
Advance to knockout stage Advance to relegation play-off

Team	Matches				Score			Pts
Team	Pld	W	D	L	For	Against	Diff	Pts
St Patrick's	3	2	1	0	64	52	+12	5
Navan O'Mahonys	3	2	0	1	73	50	+23	4
Longwood	3	1	1	1	50	69	-19	3
Bective	3	0	0	3	59	75	-16	0

==== Round 1 ====
9 August 2026 Round 1	Longwood	2-15 (21) – (16) 1-13	Bective	Boardsmill
12:00 IST (UTC+1)		(HT: 1-07 – 0-08)
		Report

9 August 2026 Round 1	St Patrick's	1-14 (17) – (13) 0-13	Navan O'Mahonys	Walterstown
14:00 IST (UTC+1)
	Pts: Jamie Murphy 1-6 (2f, 1tpf), Donal Landy 0-4, John Mannion 0-1, Ben Sullivan 0-1, Senan McKeon 0-1, Seán Emmanuel 0-1	Report	Pts: Cormac Nugent 0-6 (1tp), Robbie Keelaghan 0-3 (2f), Duggie Dillon 0-2, Aodhan Mallon 0-1, Christopher Dillon 0-1

==== Round 2 ====
23 August 2026 Round 2	Navan O'Mahonys	4-23 (35) – (11) 1-08	Longwood	Athboy
14:00 IST (UTC+1)
		Report

23 August 2026 Round 2	Bective	2-15 (21) – (29) 3-20	St Patrick's	Curraha
16:00 IST (UTC+1)

==== Round 3 ====
5 September 2026 Round 3	Longwood	3-09 (18) – (18) 1-15	St Patrick's	Ratoath
17:00 IST (UTC+1)
		Report

5 September 2026 Round 3	Navan O'Mahonys	2-19 (25) – (22) 2-16	Bective	Simonstown
17:00 IST (UTC+1)
		Report

=== Group B ===
Advance to knockout stage Advance to relegation play-off

Team	Matches				Score			Pts
Team	Pld	W	D	L	For	Against	Diff	Pts
Clann na nGael	3	3	0	0	79	42	+37	6
Walterstown	3	2	0	1	56	52	+4	4
St Michael's	3	1	0	2	58	63	-5	2
Drumbaragh Emmets	3	0	0	3	46	82	-36	0

==== Round 1 ====
9 August 2026 Round 1	St Michael's	0-20 (20) – (22) 3-13	Walterstown	Kilmainham
14:00 IST (UTC+1)		(HT: 0-12 – 0-10)
		Report

9 August 2026 Round 1	Drumbaragh Emmets	2-09 (15) – (37) 4-25	Clann na nGael	Martry
14:00 IST (UTC+1)		(HT: 2-03 – 2-13)

==== Round 2 ====
23 August 2026 Round 2	Walterstown	2-18 (24) – (13) 0-13	Drumbaragh Emmets	Gibbstown
14:00 IST (UTC+1)

23 August 2026 Round 2	Clann na nGael	4-11 (23) – (17) 0-17	St Michael's	Cortown
14:00 IST (UTC+1)
		Report

==== Round 3 ====
5 September 2026 Round 3	Clann na nGael	3-10 (19) – (10) 0-10	Walterstown	Trim
17:00 IST (UTC+1)

5 September 2026 Round 3	St Michael's	0-21 (21) – (18) 1-15	Drumbaragh Emmets	Dunganny
18:00 IST (UTC+1)

=== Group C ===
Advance to knockout stage Advance to relegation play-off

Team	Matches				Score			Pts
Team	Pld	W	D	L	For	Against	Diff	Pts
Meath Hill	3	3	0	0	59	39	+20	6
Moynalvey	3	2	0	1	56	44	+12	4
Dunsany	3	0	1	2	46	61	-15	1
Blackhall Gaels	3	0	1	2	41	58	-17	1

==== Round 1 ====
9 August 2026 Round 1	Blackhall Gaels	1-14 (17) – (17) 0-17	Dunsany	Summerhill
12:00 IST (UTC+1)		(HT: 0-07 – 0-08)

9 August 2026 Round 1	Meath Hill	2-11 (17) – (13) 1-10	Moynalvey	Simonstown
18:00 IST (UTC+1)		(HT: 1-06 – 1-07)
		Report

==== Round 2 ====
22 August 2026 Round 2	Dunsany	1-13 (16) – (23) 2-17	Meath Hill	Castletown
18:00 IST (UTC+1)

22 August 2026 Round 2	Moynalvey	0-22 (22) – (14) 1-11	Blackhall Gaels	Dunboyne
18:00 IST (UTC+1)
		Report

==== Round 3 ====
4 September 2026 Round 3	Moynalvey	1-18 (21) – (13) 1-10	Dunsany	Batterstown
19:30 IST (UTC+1)
		Report

4 September 2026 Round 3	Blackhall Gaels	1-07 (10) – (19) 1-16	Meath Hill	Navan
19:30 IST (UTC+1)

=== Group D ===
Advance to knockout stage Advance to relegation play-off

Team	Matches				Score			Pts
Team	Pld	W	D	L	For	Against	Diff	Pts
Castletown	3	2	0	1	58	49	+9	4
Duleek/ Bellewstown	3	2	0	1	46	37	+9	4
Oldcastle	3	2	0	1	56	41	+15	4
Ballivor	3	0	0	3	36	69	-33	0

==== Round 1 ====
9 August 2026 Round 1	Duleek/Bellewstown	2-17 (23) – (15) 0-15	Ballivor	Bective
16:00 IST (UTC+1)		(HT: 0-12 – 0-07)
		Report

9 August 2026 Round 1	Oldcastle	4-12 (24) – (22) 1-19	Castletown	Kells
16:00 IST (UTC+1)		(HT: 3-07 – 1-06)
	Pts: Pat Crawley 1-4 (2f), Jason Scully 1-1, Rory Crawley 1-0, Steven Lawless 1-0, Paul Hennessey 0-2 (tp), Colin Hawdon 0-2, Pearse Sheridan 0-1, Shane Boylan 0-1, Robbie Farrelly 0-1	Report	Pts: Darragh Weldon 1-3 (1f, 1tp), Kevin Ross 0-6 (1tpf, 1tp), Killian Price 0-4 (1tp), Declan Cribbin 0-2, Dan Moran 0-2, Adam Matthews 0-1, Rian McConnell 0-1	Referee: Adam Corcoran (Drumbaragh Emmets)

==== Round 2 ====
20 August 2026 Round 2	Ballivor	0-06 (6) – (25) 4-13	Oldcastle	Ballinlough
19:30 IST (UTC+1)		(HT: 0-03 – 2-06)
	Pts: Adam Gannon 0-2 (tp), Conal Diggins 0-1, Thomas Raleigh 0-1 ('45), Kevin McKeon 0-1, Edward Dunne 0-1	Report	Pts: Pearse Sheridan 1-4. Colin Hawdon 1-2, Shane Boylan 1-2, Ryan Halpin 1-0, Pat Crawley 0-3, Paul Hennessy 0-2 (tp)

22 August 2026 Round 2	Castletown	0-15 (15) – (10) 0-10	Duleek/Bellewstown	Navan
19:30 IST (UTC+1)

==== Round 3 ====
3 September 2026 Round 3	Oldcastle	0-07 (7) – (13) 0-13	Duleek/Bellewstown	Carlanstown
19:30 IST (UTC+1)		(HT: 0-04 – 0-08)
	Pts: Pat Crawley 0-5 (2f), Paul Hennessy 0-1, Pearse Sheridan 0-1	Report	Pts: James McWeeney 0-5 (1f), John Flood 0-2 (2f), Sam O'Leary 0-2, Eamonn Armstrong 0-1, James McGarvey 0-1, Joe Hartford 0-1, Johnny McDonnell 0-1	Referee: Ciarán Flynn (Dunsany)

3 September 2026 Round 3	Ballivor	1-12 (15) – (21) 1-18	Castletown	Carnaross
19:30 IST (UTC+1)		(HT: 1-05 – 0-15)

== Relegation Play-off ==
The relegation play-off consists of the 4th placed finishers in each group. The winners of each playoff round will retain their intermediate status while the outright loser will be relegated to the Junior Championship for 2027.

=== Relegation Semi-Finals ===
17 September 2026 Relegation Semi-Final	Ballivor	2-13 (19) – (17) 1-14	Drumbaragh Emmets	Martry
20:00 IST (UTC+1)

18 September 2026 Relegation Semi-Final	Blackhall Gaels	1-17 (20) – (18) 1-15	Bective	Dunshaughlin
20:00 IST (UTC+1)

=== Relegation Final ===
1 October 2026 Relegation Final	Drumbaragh Emmets	1-06 (9) – (19) 2-13	Bective	Dunganny
20:00 IST (UTC+1)

== Knock-out Stage ==
The 1st and 2nd placed teams in each group qualify for the quarter-finals. Quarter-Final pairings will be drawn with one group winner playing a 2nd placed team in each pair with no repeat pairings from the group stages.

=== Bracket ===
Quarter-finals
18 September, Castletown-Kilpatrick
Meath Hill	1-09
Navan O'Mahonys	1-17
19 September, Ashbourne
St Patrick's	2-19
Moynalvey	0-09
20 September, Walterstown
Clann na nGael	4-09
Duleek/Bellewstown	3-16
20 September, Navan
Castletown	1-12
Walterstown	0-16

Semi-finals
3 October, Dunsany
Navan O'Mahonys	3-17
St Patrick's	2-11
4 October, Navan
Duleek/Bellewstown	3-19
Walterstown	3-12

Final
17 October, Dunganny
Navan O'Mahonys	1-10
Duleek/Bellewstown	2-17

=== Quarter-Finals ===
18 September 2026 Quarter-Final	Meath Hill	1-09 (12) – (20) 1-17	Navan O'Mahonys	Castletown-Kilpatrick
20:00 IST (UTC+1)		(HT: 1-06 – 1-03)
	Pts: Cormac Sheehy 0-4 (1tp), Pierce McGrath 1-0, Conor Marry 0-2, James Mooney 0-1, Jake Gillen 0-1, Gary Breslin 0-1	Report	Pts: Aodhan Mallon 0-4 (2f, 1tp), Evan Coffey 0-4 (1tp), Duggie Dillon 1-0, Cormac Nugent 0-3 (3f), Robbie Keelaghan 0-3, Niall Higgins 0-1, Ronan Clarke 0-1, Christopher Dillon 0-1	Referee: Cormac Reilly (St Mary's)

19 September 2026 Quarter-Final	St Patrick's	2-19 (25) – (9) 0-09	Moynalvey	Ashbourne
19:30 IST (UTC+1)		(HT: 2-11 – 0-03)
	Pts: Donal Landy 1-4 (3f), Jamie Murphy 0-7 (2tpf, 1f, 1'45), Senan McKeon 0-4 (1tp, 1tpf), Conor Black 1-0, Ben Sullivan 0-2, Shane Dowling 0-1, Shane Landy 0-1	Report	Pts: Padraic Harnan 0-3 (1tpf), David McLoughlin 0-2 (tp), Adam Murphy 0-1, Barry Walsh 0-1, Vinny Walsh 0-1 (f), Cillian O'Sullivan 0-1 (f)	Referee: Andrew Smith (Dunshaughlin)

20 September 2026 Quarter-Final	Clann na nGael	4-09 (21) – (25) 3-16	Duleek/Bellewstown	Walterstown
12:00 IST (UTC+1)		(HT: 2-03 – 2-13)
	Pts: Thomas Doyle 1-3 (1pen, 3f), Ben Corkery 1-2, Cormac Smyth 0-4 (2f, 1tp), Philip Garry 1-0	Report	Pts: Eamonn Armstrong 2-2 (1tp), John Flood 0-6 (2f), Cianán Byrne 1-0, Oisín Miland 0-2 (tp), Shane Crosby 0-2 (tp), John McDonnell 0-2, Sam O'Leary 0-1, Kyle Doherty 0-1	Referee: Adrian Corcoran (Drumbaragh Emmets)

20 September 2026 Quarter-Final	Castletown	1-12 (15) – (16) 0-16	Walterstown	Navan
18:00 IST (UTC+1)		(HT: 0-09 – 0-06)		Venue: Simonstown Gaels GAA
	Pts: Darragh Weldon 0-5 (1tp), Adam Matthews 1-0, Darren Finney 0-2, Killian Smyth 0-2, Seán McKeown 0-1, Rian McConnell 0-1 (f), Mark Kelly 0-1	Report	Pts: Adam Quinn 0-8 (3f, 1tp), Ruairí O'Dowd 0-3 (3f), Fionnan O'Connor 0-2, Mark Foy 0-1, Conor McEntee 0-1, Adam Brady 0-1	Referee: Ciarán Flynn (Dunsany)

=== Semi-Finals ===
3 October 2026 Semi-Final	Navan O'Mahonys	3-17 (26) – (17) 2-11	St Patrick's	Dunsany
13:30 IST (UTC+1)		(HT: 3-11 – 0-07)
	Pts: Cormac Nugent 1-5 (1f), Duggie Dillon 1-2, Seán Betson 1-0, Aodhan Mallen 0-2, Ronan Clarke 0-2, Evan Coffey 0-2, Paddy Dillon 0-1, James O'Reilly 0-1, Niall Higgins 0-1, Robbie Keelaghan 0-1	Report	Pts: Senan McKeon 0-5 (1'45, 1tp, 1tpf), Shane Landy 1-1 (1f), Liam Brennan 1-0, Conor Black 0-2 (tp), Shane Dowling 0-1, David Rothwell 0-1, Donal Landy 0-1	Referee: David Gough (Slane)

4 October 2026 Semi-Final	Walterstown	3-12 (21) – (28) 3-19	Duleek/Bellewstown	Navan
16:30 IST (UTC+1)		(HT: 2-05 – 2-10)		Venue: Simonstown Gaels GAA
	Pts: Adam Quinn 2-7 (1pen, 1f, 2tp), Ruairí O'Dowd 0-4 (2f), Lorcan O'Connor 1-0, Barry O'Connell 0-1	Report	Pts: Kyle Doherty 1-3, Eoghan Heeney 1-2, John Flood 0-5 (2f), Cianan Byrne 1-0, Oisín Miland 0-2, Alan Bowden 0-2, Tom Bowden 0-1, Robin Clarke 0-1, Eamonn Armstrong 0-1, John McDonnell 0-1, Kyle Callaghan 0-1	Referee: Keith Sheerin (Castletown)

=== Final ===
17 October 2026 Final	Navan O'Mahonys	1-10 (13) – (23) 2-17	Duleek/Bellewstown	Dunganny
16:00 IST (UTC+1)
