= Richie Crean =

Irish Gaelic footballer (1959–2022)

Personal information
- Native name: Risteard Ó Croidheáin (Irish)
- Born: 1959 Lucan, Dublin, Ireland
- Died: 16 June 2022 (aged 63) Blanchardstown, Dublin, Ireland
- Occupation: Secondary school teacher

Sport
- Sport: Gaelic football
- Position: Midfield
Clubs
- Years: Club
- Lucan Sarsfields; Navan O'Mahonys
Club titles
- Meath titles: 4
College
- Years: College
- Maynooth University
College titles
- Sigerson titles: 0
Inter-county
- Years: County
- 1979–1983: Dublin
Inter-county titles
- Leinster titles: 1
- All-Irelands: 1
- NFL: 0
- All Stars: 0

Richard Crean (1959 – 16 June 2022) was an Irish Gaelic football player, manager and selector. As a player, he lined out with Lucan Sarsfields, Navan O'Mahonys and the Dublin senior football team. Crean also served in a number of management positions at club and inter-county levels.

== Playing career ==
Crean first played Gaelic football at juvenile and underage levels with the Lucan Sarsfields club. He was still eligible for the minor grade when he won a Dublin JFC title in 1977. Crean later transferred to the Navan O'Mahonys club and won four successive Meath SFC titles.

Crean first appeared on the inter-county scene for Dublin with the minor team in 1977. Crean enjoyed his first inter-county success when he won a Leinster JFC title in 1983. By that stage he had also joined the senior team and was a substitute when Dublin beat Galway in the 1983 All-Ireland final.

== Coaching career ==
Crean was heavily involved in coaching at all levels with the Lucan Sarsfields club and guided the team to the Dublin IFC title in 1995. He was later coach to the Dublin senior team under the management of Tommy Carr. Crean also enjoyed a stint as a selector under Jack Sheedy with the Longford senior football team.

== Death ==
Crean died at Connolly Hospital in Blanchardstown on 16 June 2022, at the age of 63.

== Honours ==
=== Player ===
Lucan Sarsfields

- Dublin Junior Football Championship: 1977

Navan O'Mahonys

- Meath Senior Football Championship: 1987, 1988, 1989, 1990

Dublin

- All-Ireland Senior Football Championship: 1983
- Leinster Senior Football Championship: 1983
- Leinster Junior Football Championship: 1983

=== Management ===
Lucan Sarsfields

- Dublin Intermediate Football Championship: 1995
