= 1988 Meath Intermediate Football Championship =

Meath I.F.C.
- Season: 1988
- Champions: St. Colmcille's; 1st Intermediate Football Championship title
- Relegated: n/a
- Matches: ??

The 1988 Meath Intermediate Football Championship is the 62nd edition of the Meath GAA's premier club Gaelic football tournament for intermediate graded teams in County Meath, Ireland. The tournament consists of 21 teams. The championship starts with a group stage and then progresses to a knock out stage.

This was Moynalty's return to the grade as they were promoted from the J.F.C. after claiming the 1987 Meath Junior Football Championship title.

Syddan and Martry Harps were relegated from the S.F.C. last year, and returned to the middle grade after a 46 and 2 year absences respectfully.

On 27 November 1988, St. Colmcille's claimed their 1st Intermediate championship title when they defeated Dunderry 1–11 to 2–7 in the final replay at Pairc Tailteann.

== Team changes ==
The following teams have changed division since the 1987 championship season.

=== From I.F.C. ===
Promoted to S.F.C.

- Oldcastle - (Intermediate Champions)

Relegated to J.A.F.C.

- n/a

=== To I.F.C. ===
Regraded from S.F.C.

- Martry Harps
- Syddan

Promoted from J.A.F.C.

- Moynalty - (Junior 'A' Champions)

== Group stage ==
There are 4 groups called Group A, B, C and D. The top two finishers in all groups will qualify for the quarter finals.

=== Group A ===
Team	Pld	W	L	D	PF	PA	PD	Pts
Meath Hill	4	3	0	1	36*	19*	+17*	7
Dunderry	4	3	1	0	34*	24*	+10*	6
Kilmainhamwood	4	2	2	0	45	27	+18	4
Donaghmore	4	1	3	0	18*	34*	-16*	2
Duleek	4	0	4	0	8*	37*	-29*	0

Round 1:

- Meath Hill 5-5, 0-5 Duleek, Rathkenny, 24/4/1988,
- Kilmainhamwood 2-9, 1-6 Donaghmore, Seneschalstown, 24/4/1988,
- Dunderry - Bye,

Round 2:

- Dunderry 2-13, 1-6 Donaghmore, Skryne, 14/5/1988,
- Kilmainhamwood 2-11, 0-3 Duleek, 12/6/1988,
- Meath Hill - Bye,

Round 3:

- Dunderry w, l Duleek, Seneschalstown, 18/6/1988,
- Meath Hill 1–4, 0-7 Kilmainhamwood, Castletown, 8/7/1988,
- Donaghmore - Bye,

Round 4:

- Dunderry 1-5, 1-3 Kilmainhamwood, Kilberry, 8/8/1988,
- Meath Hill w, l Donaghmore, Seneschalstown, 23/7/1988,
- Duleek - Bye,

Round 5:

- Meath Hill 1-6, 1-4 Dunderry, Rathkenny, 28/8/1988,
- Donaghmore w/o, scr Duleek,
- Kilmainhamwood - Bye,

=== Group B ===
Team	Pld	W	L	D	PF	PA	PD	Pts
Ratoath	4	3	1	0	43	34	+9	6
St. Colmcille's	4	3	1	0	50	44	+6	6
Navan O'Mahonys 'B'	4	2	1	1	29*	22*	+7	5
Ballivor	4	1	2	1	33*	27*	+6	3
Rathkenny	4	0	4	0	12	40	-28	0

Round 1:

- Ratoath 3-8, 1-6 St. Colmcille's, Stamullen, 24/4/1988,
- Ballivor 2-9, 1-4 Rathkenny, Kells, 24/4/1988,
- Navan O'Mahonys 'B' - Bye,

Round 2:

- Navan O'Mahonys 'B' d, d Ballivor, Dunderry, 24/5/1988,
- Ratoath 2-9, 0-3 Rathkenny, Walterstown, 9/6/1988,
- St. Colmcille's - Bye,

Round 3:

- St. Colmcille's 1-7, 0-2 Rathkenny, Duleek, 11/6/1988,
- Navan O'Mahonys 'B' 4-10, 0-11 Ratoath, Skryne, 21/6/1988,
- Ballivor - Bye,

Round 4:

- St. Colmcille's 2-14, 4-6 Ballivor, Dunshaughlin, 6/7/1988,
- Navan O'Mahonys 'B' w/o, scr Rathkenny, Kilberry, 8/7/1988,
- Ratoath - Bye,

Round 5:

- St. Colmcille's 1-8, 0-7 Navan O'Mahonys 'B', Skryne, 9/8/1988,
- Ratoath w/o, scr Ballivor, Kilmessan, 14/8/1988,
- Rathkenny - Bye,

=== Group C ===
Team	Pld	W	L	D	PF	PA	PD	Pts
Syddan	4	3	0	1	50	39	+11	7
St. Mary's Donore	4	3	1	0	52	48	+4	6
Dunshaughlin	4	2	1	1	49	34	+15	5
Bellewstown	4	1	3	0	35	51	-16	2
Wolfe Tones	4	0	4	0	36	50	-14	0

Round 1:

- Dunshaughlin 2-9, 0-8 Wolfe Tones, Duleek, 24/4/1988,
- Syddan 1-11, 2-5 St. Mary's, Walterstown, 24/4/1988,
- Bellewstown - Bye,

Round 2:

- St. Mary's 1-9, 1-7 Wolfe Tones, Seneschalstown, 29/5/1988,
- Dunshaughlin 0-16, 1-3 Bellewstown, Kells, 12/6/1988,
- Syddan - Bye,

Round 3:

- Syddan 4-4, 2-6 Wolfe Tones, Rathkenny, 11/6/1988,
- St. Mary's 2-10, 2-7 Bellewstown, Kells, 12/6/1988,
- Dunshaughlin - Bye,

Round 4:

- Syddan 0–7, 0-7 Dunshaughlin, Seneschalstown, 10/7/1988,
- Bellewstown 0-7, 0-6 Wolfe Tones, Seneschalstown, 10/7/1988,
- St. Mary's - Bye,

Round 5:

- Syddan 2-7, 1-6 Bellewstown, Seneschalstown, 24/7/1988,
- St. Mary's 2-7, 1-8 Dunshaughlin, Skryne, 11/9/1988,
- Wolfe Tones - Bye,

=== Group D ===
Team	Pld	W	L	D	PF	PA	PD	Pts
St. Michael's	5	4	1	0	78	32	+46	8
Martry Harps	5	3	1	1	52	40	+12	7
Ballinabrackey	5	3	2	0	35	55	-20	6
Moynalty	5	2	2	1	56	57	-1	5
Dunsany	5	2	3	0	31	31	+0	4
Athboy	5	0	5	0	18	55	-37	0

Round 1:

- Martry Harps 4-8, 0-3 Ballinabrackey, Trim, 9/8/1988,
- Moynalty 1-12, 1-7 Athboy, Ballinlough, 24/4/1988,
- St. Michael's 1-11, 0-7 Dunsany, Rathkenny, 24/4/1988,

Round 2:

- Martry Harps 2-14, 0-8 Athboy, Dunderry, 4/6/1988,
- Moynalty 1-9, 1-7 Dunsany, Kilberry, 11/6/1988,
- Ballinabrackey 3-5, 2-5 St. Michael's, Trim, 12/6/1988,

Round 3:

- Martry Harps 1–7, 0-10 Moynalty, Kells, 18/6/1988,
- Dunsany 3-5, 0-5 Ballinabrackey, Summerhill, 18/6/1988,
- St. Michael's 2-14, 0-0 Athboy, Martry, 15/7/1988, *

Round 4:

- Ballinabrackey 2-7, 1-7 Moynalty, Kilmessan, 10/7/1988,
- St. Michael's 1-16, 0-2 Martry Harps, Kells, 7/8/1988,
- Dunsany w/o, scr Athboy,

Round 5:

- Martry Harps w/o, scr Dunsany, Dunderry, 20/8/1988,
- St. Michael's 2-8, 1-6 Moynalty, Kells, 28/8/1988,
- Ballinabrackey w/o, scr Athboy,

- Athboy conceded the points to St. Michael's at half time due to not scoring in the first half.

== Knock-out Stages ==
=== Finals ===
The teams in the quarter-finals are the top two finishers from each group.

Quarter-Finals
Dunderry	1-7
Syddan	1-2
Ratoath	1-11
Martry Harps	2-10
Meath Hill	0-7
St. Colmcille's	1-6
St. Michael's	0-8
St. Mary's	0-6

Semi-Finals
Dunderry	2-9
Martry Harps	1-4
St. Colmcille's	0-14
St. Michael's	1-7

Final
Dunderry	2-7
St. Colmcille's	1-11

Quarter Final:

- Dunderry 1-7, 1-2 Syddan, Kells, 11/9/1988,
- Martry Harps 2-10, 1-11 Ratoath, Seneschalstown, 11/9/1988,
- St. Colmcille's 1-6, 0-7 Meath Hill, Rathkenny, 16/10/1988,
- St. Michael's 0-8, 0-6 St. Mary's, Rathkenny, 16/10/1988,

Semi Final:

- Dunderry 2-9, 1-4 Martry Harps, Kells, 2/10/1988,
- St. Colmcille's 0-14, 1-7 St. Michael's, Pairc Tailteann, 30/10/1988,

Final:

- St. Colmcille's 1–3, 0-6 Dunderry, Pairc Tailteann, 13/11/1988,

Final Replay:

- St. Colmcille's 1-11, 2-7 Dunderry, Pairc Tailteann, 27/11/1988,
