= 2012 Meath Senior Football Championship =

Meath S.F.C.
- Season: 2012
- Champions: Navan O'Mahonys; 18th Senior Football Championship title
- Relegated: None
- Leinster SCFC: Navan O'Mahonys; Navan O'Mahonys 0-8 Killoe 2-13
- All Ireland SCFC: N/A
- Winning Captain: Marcus Brennan (Navan O'Mahonys)
- Man of the Match: Shane Gillespie (Navan O'Mahonys)
- Matches: 47

The 2012 Meath Senior Football Championship is the 120th edition of the Meath GAA's premier club Gaelic football tournament for senior graded teams in County Meath, Ireland. The tournament consists of 17 teams, with the winner going on to represent Meath in the Leinster Senior Club Football Championship. The championship starts with a group stage and then progresses to a knock out stage.

Summerhill were the defending champions after they defeated Dunshaughlin in the previous years final.

Moynalvey were promoted after claiming the 2011 Meath Intermediate Football Championship title, their first year in the senior grade since being relegated in 2000 and only their 2nd ever period as a senior club.

The draw for the group stages of the championship was made at Áras Tailteann on 13 February 2012, with the games commencing on the weekend of 15 April 2012.

On 28 October 2012, Navan O'Mahonys claimed their 18th senior championship title when they defeated Wolfe Tones 1-11 to 0-7. Shane Gillespie was named as Man-of-the-Match and captain Marcus Brennan raised the Keegan Cup for O'Mahonys.

== Team changes ==
The following teams have changed division since the 2011 championship season.

=== To S.F.C. ===
Promoted from I.F.C.

- Moynalvey - (Intermediate Champions)

=== From S.F.C. ===
Relegated to I.F.C.

- Trim

== Participating teams ==
The teams taking part in the 2012 Meath Senior Football Championship are:

Club	Location	2011 Championship Position	2012 Championship Position
Blackhall Gaels	Batterstown	Non Qualifier	Non Qualifier
Donaghmore/Ashbourne	Ashbourne	Semi-finalist	Semi-finalist
Duleek/Bellewstown	Duleek	Relegation Play Off	Non Qualifier
Dunshaughlin	Dunshaughlin	Finalist	Non Qualifier
Moynalvey	Moynalvey	Intermediate Champions	Non Qualifier
Navan O'Mahonys	Navan	Quarter-finalist	Champions
Nobber	Nobber	Relegation Play Off	Non Qualifier
Oldcastle	Oldcastle	Non Qualifier	Non Qualifier
Rathkenny	Rathkenny	Non Qualifier	Non Qualifier
Seneschalstown	Kentstown	Non Qualifier	Semi-finalist
Simonstown Gaels	Navan	Quarter-finalist	Quarter-finalist
Skryne	Skryne	Non Qualifier	Non Qualifier
St Patricks	Stamullen	Non Qualifier	Quarter-finalist
St Peters Dunboyne	Dunboyne	Quarter-finalist	Quarter-finalist
Summerhill	Summerhill	Champions	Quarter-finalist
Walterstown	Navan	Quarter-finalist	Non Qualifier
Wolfe Tones	Kilberry	Semi-finalist	Finalist

== Senior Championship Proposals ==
During the winter of 2011/2012 proposals to change the structure of the Senior Football Championship by increasing the number of teams from 17 to 18 were passed, so that teams will have no byes during the group phase. In the 2012 Senior championship, there will be two groups of 6 teams and one group of 5 teams, however there will be no relegation from the Senior championship at the end of the season and the Intermediate championship winners will be promoted leaving the number of teams at 18 for the 2013 campaign.

== Group stage ==
There are 3 groups called Group A, B and C. The 3 top finishers in Group A and B and the top 2 finishers in Group C will qualify for the quarter-finals. The draw for the group stages of the championship were made on 13 February 2012.

=== Group A ===
Team	Pld	W	L	D	PF	PA	PD	Pts
Summerhill	5	5	1	0	100	62	+38	8
Donaghmore Ashbourne	5	4	1	0	81	62	+19	8
St Patricks	5	4	1	0	73	64	+9	8
Moynalvey	5	1	3	1	75	91	-16	3
Duleek/Bellewstown	5	0	3	2	48	59	-11	2
Nobber	5	0	4	1	50	89	-39	1

Round 1:

- Nobber 0-9, 0-9 Duleek/Bellewstown, Simonstown, 13/4/2012,
- St Patricks 1-7, 2-17 Summerhill, Pairc Tailteann, 15/4/2012,
- Donaghmore/Ashbourne 1-16, 0-16 Moynalvey, Skryne, 20/4/2012,

Round 2:

- Summerhill 1-7, 2-11 Donaghmore/Ashbourne, Dunshaughlin, 27/4/2012,
- Nobber 0-10, 2-8 Moynalvey, Walterstown, 27/4/2012,
- Duleek/Bellewstown 0-4, 0-6 St Patricks, Ashbourne, 28/4/2012,

Round 3:

- Duleek/Bellewstown 0-7, 0-15 Donaghmore/Ashbourne, Stamullen, 10/8/2012,
- St Patricks 1-13, 1-8 Nobber, Bohermeen, 11/8/2012,
- Summerhill 1-20, 1-11 Moynalvey, Dunsany, 12/8/2012,

Round 4:

- Donaghmore/Ashbourne 0-9, 2-10 St Patricks, Seneschalstown, 1/9/2012,
- Moynalvey 0-14, 2-8 Duleek/Bellewstown, Ratoath, 2/9/2012,
- Nobber 0-7, 5-14 Summerhill, Walterstown, 2/9/2012,

Round 5:

- Nobber 1-10, 2-15 Donaghmore/Ashbourne, Rathkenny, 8/9/2012,
- St Patricks 6-7, 3-8 Moynalvey, Dunshaughlin, 8/9/2012,
- Duleek/Bellewstown 0-14, 1-12 Summerhill, Pairc Tailteann, 8/9/2012.

=== Group B ===
Team	Pld	W	L	D	PF	PA	PD	Pts
Wolfe Tones	5	4	0	1	73	60	+13	9
Simonstown Gaels	5	3	1	1	79	62	+17	7
St Peters Dunboyne	5	2	1	2	64	51	+13	6
Skryne	5	1	2	2	53	58	-5	4
Walterstown	5	1	3	1	48	59	-11	3
Dunshaughlin	5	0	4	1	61	88	-27	1

Round 1:

- St Peters Dunboyne 3-12, 0-8 Dunshaughlin, Ashbourne, 12/4/2012,
- Skryne 0-8, 1-9 Simonstown Gaels, Pairc Tailteann, 15/4/2012,
- Wolfe Tones 0-12, 0-8 Walterstown, Rathkenny, 15/4/2012,

Round 2:

- Dunshaughlin 0-9, 1-6 Skryne, Ratoath, 28/4/2012,
- Walterstown 0-6, 0-9 St. Peters Dunboyne, Trim, 28/4/2012,
- Simonstown Gaels 3-5, 2-11 Wolfe Tones, Seneschalstown, 29/4/2012,

Round 3:

- Wolfe Tones 0-14, 0-10 Skryne, Trim, 11/8/2012,
- Simonstown Gaels 0-10, 0-10 St Peters Dunboyne, Pairc Tailteann, 12/8/2012,
- Walterstown 1-11, 0-10 Dunshaughlin, Pairc Tailteann, 12/8/2012,

Round 4:

- Dunshaughlin 0-17, 2-19 Simonstown Gaels, Skryne, 1/9/2012,
- St Paters Dunboyne 0-11, 0-11 Wolfe Tones, Brews Hill, 1/9/2012,
- Skryne 0-10, 0-10 Walterstown, Dunshaughlin, 2/9/2012,

Round 5:

- Simonstown Gaels 2-12, 1-7 Walterstown, Brews Hill, 9/9/2012,
- Wolfe Tones 2-13, 1-14 Dunshaughlin, Bective, 9/9/2012,
- Skryne 3-7, 1-10 St Peters Dunboyne, Ashbourne, 9/9/2012.

=== Group C ===
Team	Pld	W	L	D	PF	PA	PD	Pts
Navan O'Mahonys	4	4	0	0	63	21	+42	8
Seneschalstown	4	3	1	0	50	40	+10	6
Blackhall Gaels	4	2	2	0	36	45	-9	4
Oldcastle	4	1	3	0	33	51	-18	2
Rathkenny	4	0	4	0	34	59	-25	0

Round 1:

- Oldcastle 0-4, 1-15 Navan O'Mahonys, Kells, 14/4/2012,
- Blackhall Gaels 1-7, 1-10 Seneschalstown, Dunsany, 21/4/2012,
- Rathkenny - Bye,

Round 2:

- Oldcastle 0-6, 2-5 Blackhall Gaels, Brews Hill, 27/4/2012,
- Rathkenny 0-5, 1-11 Navan O'Mahonys, Kilberry, 29/4/2012,
- Seneschalstown - Bye,

Round 3:

- Seneschalstown 0-11, 0-7 Oldcastle, Kilmainham, 11/8/2012,
- Blackhall Gaels 1-9, 1-3 Rathkenny, Ashbourne, 12/8/2012,
- Navan O'Mahonys - Bye,

Round 4:

- Navan O'Mahonys 1-17 0-3 Blackhall Gaels, Pairc Tailteann, 2/9/2012,
- Rathkenny 0-12, 0-17 Seneschalstown, Kilberry, 2/9/2012,
- Oldcastle - Bye,

Round 5:

- Oldcastle 1-13, 1-8 Rathkenny, Kilmainahmwood, 7/9/2012,
- Seneschalstown 1-6, 0-11 Navan O'Mahonys, Pairc Tailteann, 8/9/2012,
- Blackhall Gaels - Bye,

=== Finals ===
Quarter-finals
Navan O'Mahonys	1-14
Simonstown Gaels	0-9
Donaghmore/Ashbourne	0-17
St. Peters Dunboyne	0-8
St. Patricks	0-6
Wolfe Tones	0-11
Summerhill	0-10
Seneschalstown	2-8

Semi-finals
Navan O'Mahonys	0-10
Donaghmore/Ashbourne	0-9
Wolfe Tones	1-13
Seneschalstown	0-11

Final
Navan O'Mahonys	1-11
Wolfe Tones	0-7

Quarter-finals

- Navan O'Mahonys 1-14, 0-9 Simonstown Gaels, Pairc Tailteann, 29/9/2012,
- Summerhill 0-10, 2-8 Seneschalstown, Skryne, 29/9/2012,
- Donaghmore/Ashbourne 0-17, 0-8 St. Peters Dunboyne, Pairc Tailteann, 29/9/2012
- St. Patricks 0-6, 0-11 Wolfe Tones, Ashbourne, 30/9/2012,

Semi-finals

- Navan O'Mahonys 0-10, 0-9 Donaghmore/Ashbourne, Pairc Tailteann, 14/10/2012
- Wolfe Tones 1-13, 0-11 Seneschalstown, Pairc Tailteann, 14/10/2012

Final

- Navan O'Mahonys 1-11, 0-7 Wolfe Tones, Pairc Tailteann, 28/10/2012

28 October 2012
3:30pm
Final

Navan O'Mahonys	1-11 - 0-7	Wolfe Tones
S Bray (0-5), S Gillespie (1-1), J Regan (0-3), S Mac Gabhann, D Bray (0-1) each.		C Ward (0-5), E Harrington, S Sheppard (0-1) each.

Pairc Tailteann, Meath
Referee: D Coldrick Blackhall Gaels
