= 1986 Meath Intermediate Football Championship =

Meath I.F.C.
- Season: 1986
- Champions: Gaeil Colmcille; 1st Intermediate Football Championship title
- Relegated: n/a
- Matches: ??

The 1986 Meath Intermediate Football Championship is the 60th edition of the Meath GAA's premier club Gaelic football tournament for intermediate graded teams in County Meath, Ireland. The tournament consists of 18 teams. The championship starts with a group stage and then progresses to a knock out stage.

This was Ballinabrackey's return to the grade after a four-year absence as they were promoted from the J.F.C. after claiming the 1985 Meath Junior Football Championship title.

On 19 October 1986, Gaeil Colmcille marked their 20th anniversary with their 1st Intermediate championship title since being formed from the Drumbaragh Emmets and Kells Harps clubs in 1966, when they defeated Meath Hill 1–6 to 0–7 in the final at Kells. This ended their two-year absence from the S.F.C.

== Team changes ==
The following teams have changed division since the 1985 championship season.

=== From I.F.C. ===
Promoted to S.F.C.

- Martry Harps - (Intermediate Champions)

Relegated to J.A.F.C.

- Moylagh

=== To I.F.C. ===
Regraded from S.F.C.

- Kilmainhamwood

Promoted from J.A.F.C.

- Ballinabrackey - (Junior 'A' Champions)

== Group stage ==
There are 4 groups called Group A, B, C and D. The top two finishers in all groups will qualify for the quarter-finals.

=== Group A ===
| Team | Pld | W | L | D | PF | PA | PD | Pts |
|---|---|---|---|---|---|---|---|---|
| St. Colmcille's | 4 | 3 | 0 | 1 | 45* | 27* | +18* | 7 |
| Gaeil Colmcille | 4 | 3 | 0 | 1 | 53 | 22 | +31 | 7 |
| Ballinabrackey | 4 | 1 | 2 | 1 | 30 | 40 | -10 | 3 |
| Dunsany | 4 | 1 | 3 | 0 | 32* | 27* | +5* | 2 |
| Donaghmore | 4 | 0 | 3 | 1 | 28 | 69 | -41 | 1 |

Round 1:

- Gaeil Colmcille 3-11, 1-1 Donaghmore, Walterstown, 11/5/1986,
- Ballinabrackey 0-7, 1-2 Dunsany, Trim, 11/5/1986,
- St. Colmcille's - Bye,

Round 2:

- St. Colmcille's 2-9, 1-4 Donaghmore, Bellewstown, 25/5/1986,
- Gaeil Colmcille 2-1, 0-2 Ballinabrackey, Trim, 22/6/1986,
- Dunsany - Bye,

Round 3:

- St. Colmcille's 2-10, 2-3 Ballinabrackey, Kilmessan, 13/7/1986,
- Gaeil Colmcille 2-9, 0-5 Dunsany, Skryne, 31/7/1986,
- Donaghmore - Bye,

Round 4:

- Gaeil Colmcille 1–8, 2-5 St. Colmcille's, Duleek, 10/8/1986,
- Dunsany 3-13, 0-5 Donaghmore, Skryne, 10/8/1986,
- Ballinabrackey - Bye,

Round 5:

- Ballinabrackey 1–9, 1-9 Donaghmore, Summerhill, 31/7/1986,
- St. Colmcille's w, l Dunsany, Duleek, 26/8/1986,
- Gaeil Colmcille - Bye,

=== Group B ===
| Team | Pld | W | L | D | PF | PA | PD | Pts |
|---|---|---|---|---|---|---|---|---|
| Dunshaughlin | 4 | 3 | 1 | 0 | 45 | 43 | +2 | 6 |
| Dunderry | 4 | 3 | 1 | 0 | 43 | 26 | +17 | 6 |
| Oldcastle | 4 | 2 | 2 | 0 | 40 | 46 | -6 | 4 |
| Athboy | 4 | 1 | 3 | 0 | 49 | 54 | -5 | 2 |
| St. Michael's | 4 | 1 | 3 | 0 | 41 | 49 | -8 | 2 |

Round 1:

- St. Michael's 2-10, 1-8 Oldcastle, Ballinlough, 11/5/1986,
- Dunderry 2-8, 0-7 Athboy, Trim, 11/5/1986,
- Dunshaughlin - Bye,

Round 2:

- Dunderry 0-9, 0-4 Oldcastle, Kells, 25/5/1986,
- Dunshaughlin 0-10, 0-9 St. Michael's, Kilberry, 25/5/1986,
- Athboy - Bye,

Round 3:

- Dunshaughlin 1-6, 0-8 Dunderry, Trim, 22/6/1986,
- Oldcastle 1-11, 2-5 Athboy, Kilskyre, 22/6/1986,
- St. Michael's - Bye,

Round 4:

- Athboy 3-7, 0-10 St. Michael's, Ballinlough, 13/7/1986,
- Oldcastle 1-8, 1-7 Dunshaughlin, Martry, 31/7/1986,
- Dunderry - Bye,

Round 5:

- Dunderry 1-9, 0-6 St. Michael's, Kells, 31/7/1986,
- Dunshaughlin 2-10, 1-12 Athboy, Summerhill, 10/8/1986,
- Oldcastle - Bye,

=== Group C ===
| Team | Pld | W | L | D | PF | PA | PD | Pts |
|---|---|---|---|---|---|---|---|---|
| St. Mary's Donore | 3 | 3 | 0 | 0 | 48 | 24 | +24 | 6 |
| Kilmainhamwood | 3 | 2 | 1 | 0 | 25 | 31 | -6 | 4 |
| Rathkenny | 3 | 0 | 2 | 1 | 26 | 34 | -8 | 1 |
| Ratoath | 3 | 0 | 2 | 1 | 30 | 40 | -10 | 1 |

Round 1:

- Kilmainhamwood 0-7, 0-6 Rathkenny, Castletown, 10/5/1986,
- St. Mary's 2-9, 1-8 Ratoath, Duleek, 11/5/1986,

Round 2:

- St. Mary's 2-10, 0-3 Kilmainhamwood, Castletown, 25/5/1986,
- Rathkenny 2–4, 0-10 Ratoath, Seneschalstown, 21/6/1986,

Round 3:

- St. Mary's 2-11, 3-1 Rathkenny, Duleek, 13/7/1986,
- Kilmainhamwood 2-9, 2-3 Ratoath, Seneschalstown, 13/7/1986,

=== Group D ===
| Team | Pld | W | L | D | PF | PA | PD | Pts |
|---|---|---|---|---|---|---|---|---|
| Meath Hill | 3 | 3 | 0 | 0 | 30 | 20 | +10 | 6 |
| Navan O'Mahonys 'B' | 3 | 2 | 1 | 0 | 34 | 28 | +6 | 4 |
| Duleek | 3 | 0 | 2 | 1 | 25 | 31 | -6 | 1 |
| Wolfe Tones | 3 | 0 | 2 | 1 | 22 | 32 | -10 | 1 |

Round 1:

- Meath Hill 1-9, 2-5 Navan O'Mahonys 'B', Kells, 11/5/1986,
- Duleek 1–8, 2-5 Wolfe Tones, Rathkenny, 11/5/1986,

Round 2:

- Navan O'Mahonys 'B' 1-9, 1-5 Duleek, Skryne, 25/5/1986,
- Meath Hill 0-10, 0-3 Wolfe Tones, Syddan, 8/6/1986,

Round 3:

- Meath Hill 1-5, 0-6 Duleek, Kilberry, 22/6/1986,
- Navan O'Mahonys 'B' 1-8, 1-5 Wolfe Tones, Rathkenny, 28/6/1986,

== Knock-out Stages ==
=== Finals ===
The teams in the quarter-finals are the top two finishers from each group.

Quarter-Finals
Gaeil Colmcille | 2-10 R
St. Mary's | 1-6 R
Navan O'Mahonys 'B' | 1-7
Dunshaughlin | 1-4
St. Colmcille's | 4-6
Dunderry | 0-4
Meath Hill | 1-5
Kilmainhamwood | 0-7

Semi-Finals
Gaeil Colmcille | 0-7 R
Navan O'Mahonys 'B' | 0-6 R
St. Colmcille's | 0-5
Meath Hill | 1-10

Final
Gaeil Colmcille | 1-6
Meath Hill | 0-7

Quarter-final:

- Gaeil Colmcille 2–5, 0-11 St. Mary's, Walterstown, 31/8/1986,
- Navan O'Mahonys 1-7, 1-4 Dunshaughlin, Athboy, 31/8/1986,
- St. Colmcille's 4-6, 0-4 Dunderry, Seneschalstown, 31/8/1986,
- Meath Hill 1-5, 0-7 Kilmainhamwood, Kells, 31/8/1986,

Quarter-final Replay:

- Gaeil Colmcille 2–10, 1-6 St. Mary's, Walterstown, 14/9/1986,

Semi-final:

- Gaeil Colmcille 0–9, 1-6 Navan O'Mahonys 'B', Walterstown 28/9/1986,
- Meath Hill 1-10, 0-5 St. Colmcille's, Kells, 28/9/1986,

Semi-final Replay:

- Gaeil Colmcille 0-7, 0-6 Navan O'Mahonys 'B', Trim, 5/10/1986,

Final:

- Gaeil Colmcille 1-6, 0-7 Meath Hill, Kells, 9/10/1986,
