= 1960 Meath Senior Football Championship =

Meath S.F.C.
- Season: 1960
- Champions: Navan O'Mahonys; 5th Senior Championship Title
- Relegated: Carnaross
- Winning Captain: Eanna Giles (Navan O'Mahonys)
- Matches: 13

The 1960 Meath Senior Football Championship is the 68th edition of the Meath GAA's premier club Gaelic football tournament for senior graded teams in County Meath, Ireland. The tournament consists of 13 teams. The championship employed a straight knock-out format.

This season saw Donaghmore's return to the top flight after claiming the 1959 Meath Intermediate Football Championship title, ending their 2 year exodus from the top-flight.

Navan O'Mahonys were the defending champions after they defeated Skryne in the previous years final, and they successfully defended their crown to claim their 5th S.F.C. title (4-in-a-row) by defeating Drumbaragh in the final at Pairc Tailteann by 2-11 to 0-6 on 16 October 1960. Eanna Giles raised the Keegan Cup for the Hoops in front of an attendance of approximately 3,500.

At the end of the season Carnaross were regraded to the 1961 J.A.F.C. after 3 years as a senior club.

== Team changes ==
The following teams have changed division since the 1959 championship season.

=== To S.F.C. ===
Promoted from 1959 I.F.C.

- Donaghmore - (Intermediate Champions).

=== From S.F.C. ===
Regraded to 1960 I.F.C.

- None

Regraded to 1960 J.A.F.C.

- Carnaross

== First round ==
10 teams enter this round selected by random draw. The winner progresses to the quarter-finals.

- St. Peter's Dunboyne 2-8, 2-1 Carnaross, Pairc Tailteann, 17/4/1960,
- Navan O'Mahonys 2-6, 1-3 Skryne, Trim, 17/4/1960,
- Drumbaragh 2-6, 1-4 St. Mary's Bettystown, Castletown, 17/4/1960,
- Trim 3-7, 2-10 Donaghmore, Pairc Tailteann, 17/4/1960,
- Syddan 1-8, 2-4 Kells Harps, Castletown, 22/5/1960,
- Trim 1-10, 1-6 Donaghmore, Pairc Tailteann, 29/5/1960, (Replay)
- Ballinlough - Bye,
- Ballivor - Bye,
- St. Vincent's - Bye,

== Quarter-finals ==
The 3 remaining clubs (Ballinlough, Ballivor & St. Vincent's) along with the Round 1 winners enter this round.

- Ballivor +2, -2 Ballinlough, Trim, 17/4/1960,
- Drumbaragh 3-9, 0-8 St. Vincent's, Pairc Tailteann, 22/5/1960,
- Trim w, l St. Peter's Dunboyne, Skryne, 10/7/1960,
- Navan O'Mahonys 3-11, 1-2 Syddan, Kells, 17/7/1960,

== Semi-finals ==
- Navan O'Mahonys 5-6, 1-2 Ballivor, Trim, 31/7/1960,
- Drumbaragh 3-2, 1-7 Trim, Pairc Tailteann, 18/9/1960,

== Final ==
- Navan O'Mahonys 2-11, 0-6 Drumbaragh, Pairc Tailteann, 16/10/1960,
