= 1986 Meath Senior Football Championship =

Meath S.F.C.
- Season: 1986
- Champions: Summerhill; 5th Senior Championship Title
- Relegated: Ballivor
- Leinster SCFC: Walterstown (Semi-Final) Ferbane 2-10, Summerhill 0-10.
- All Ireland SCFC: n/a
- Winning Captain: Padraic Lyons (Summerhill)
- Man of the Match: Mick Lyons (Summerhill)
- Matches: 45

The 1986 Meath Senior Football Championship is the 94th edition of the Meath GAA's premier club Gaelic football tournament for senior graded teams in County Meath, Ireland. The tournament consists of 14 teams, with the winner going on to represent Meath in the Leinster Senior Club Football Championship. The championship starts with a group stage and then progresses to a knock out stage.

Navan O'Mahonys were the defending champions after they defeated Skryne in the previous years final, but they lost their crown controversially to Nobber at the quarter-final stage.

Martry Harps returned to the senior grade after claiming the 1985 Meath Intermediate Football Championship title.

Summerhill claimed their 5th S.F.C. title when defeating Seneschalstown 0–13 to 1–8 in the final at Kells on 28 September 1986. Padraic Lyons raised the Keegan Cup for Summerhill while his brother Mick Lyons claimed the 'Man of the Match' award.

Ballivor were regraded to the I.F.C. for 1987 after failing to win a match.

== Team changes ==
The following teams have changed division since the 1985 championship season.

=== To S.F.C. ===
Promoted from I.F.C.

- Martry Harps – (Intermediate Champions)

=== From S.F.C. ===
Regraded to I.F.C.

- Kilmainhamwood

== Group stage ==
=== Group A ===
Team	Pld	W	L	D	PF	PA	PD	Pts
Summerhill	4	4	0	0	56	20	+36	8
Skryne	4	3	1	0	50	35	+15	6
Syddan	4	2	2	0	27	31	-4	4
Moynalvey	4	1	3	0	34	48	-14	2
St. Patrick's	4	0	4	0	28	61	-33	0

Round 1

- Summerhill 1-10, 0-4 Skryne, Dunshaughlin, 9/5/1986,
- Moynalvey 2-7, 1-8 St. Patrick's, Seneschalstown, 11/5/1986,
- Syddan – Bye,

Round 2

- Skryne 0-12, 0-4 Syddan, Seneschalstown, 1/6/1986,
- Summerhill 2-9, 1-2 Moynalvey, Dunshaughlin, 20/6/1986,
- St. Patrick's – Bye,

Round 3

- Syddan 0-7, 0-5 Moynalvey, Walterstown, 12/7/1986,
- Summerhill 2-13, 0-5 St. Patrick's, Dunshaughlin, 13/7/1986,
- Skryne – Bye,

Round 4

- Summerhill 0-9, 0-6 Syddan, Walterstown, 31/7/1986,
- Skryne 2-13, 1-4 St. Patrick's, Bellewstown, 31/7/1986,
- Moynalvey – Bye,

Round 5

- Syddan 0-10, 0-5 St. Patrick's, Duleek, 10/8/1986,
- Skryne 1-12, 1-8 Moynalvey, Summerhill, 31/8/1986,
- Summerhill – Bye,

=== Group B ===
Team	Pld	W	L	D	PF	PA	PD	Pts
Seneschalstown	4	3	0	1	47	26	+21	7
Nobber	4	3	1	0	48	32	+16	6
Trim	4	2	1	1	45	32	+13	5
Martry Harps	4	1	3	0	30	55	-25	2
Ballivor	4	0	4	0	10	35	-25	0

Round 1

- Seneschalstown 0–10, 0-10 Trim, Skryne, 11/5/1986,
- Martry Harps 1-6, 0-5 Ballivor, Athboy, 11/5/1986,
- Nobber – Bye,

Round 2

- Seneschalstown 3-13, 0-7 Martry Harps, Kilberry, 25/5/1986,
- Nobber 2-5, 0-2 Ballivor, Trim, 1/6/1986,
- Trim – Bye,

Round 3

- Trim 0-12, 1-4 Martry Harps, Athboy, 21/6/1986,
- Seneschalstown 2-9, 1-6 Nobber, Castletown, 22/6/1986,
- Ballivor – Bye,

Round 4

- Nobber 1-13, 2-1 Martry Harps, Castletown, 13/7/1986,
- Trim 2-9, 0-3 Ballivor, Boardsmill, 13/7/1986,
- Seneschalstown – Bye,

Round 5

- Nobber 1-9, 1-5 Trim, Seneschalstown, 31/7/1986,
- Seneschalstown w/o, scr Ballivor, Athboy, 31/7/1986,
- Martry Harps – Bye,

=== Group C ===
Team	Pld	W	L	D	PF	PA	PD	Pts
Navan O'Mahonys	3	3	0	0	37	13	+24	6
Walterstown	3	2	1	0	34	36	-2	4
Slane	3	1	2	0	24	35	-11	2
Castletown	3	0	3	0	15	26	-11	0

Round 1

- Navan O'Mahonys 4-10, 0-5 Walterstown, Kells, 11/5/1986,
- Slane 1-7, 0-7 Castletown, Rathkenny, 11/5/1986,

Round 2

- Walterstown 2-10, 0-8 Castletown, Kells, 1/6/1986,
- Navan O'Mahonys 2-9, 1-5 Slane, Seneschalstown, 29/6/1986,

Round 3

- Walterstown 1-10, 1-3 Slane, Skryne, 13/7/1986,
- Navan O'Mahonys w/o, scr Casletown,

== Knock-out Stages ==
The teams in the quarter-finals are the second placed teams from each group and the Group C winner. The teams in the semi-finals are Group A and B winners along with the quarter-final winners.

Quarter-Finals
Navan O'Mahonys	scr
Nobber	w/o
Skryne	0-12
Walterstown	2-7

Semi-Finals
Summerhill	1-6
Nobber	0-8
Seneschalstown	1-10
Walterstown	0-5

Final
Summerhill	0-13
Seneschalstown	1-8

Quarter-finals:

- Nobber w/o, scr Navan O'Mahonys, Rathkenny, 7/9/1986, *
- Walterstown 2-7, 0-12 Skryne, Duleek, 7/9/1986,

Semi-finals:

- Summerhill 1-6, 0-8 Nobber, Kells, 14/9/1983,
- Seneschalstown 1-10, 0-5 Walterstown, Kells, 14/9/1983,

Final:

- Summerhill 0-13, 1-8 Seneschalstown, Kells, 28/9/1983,

The quarter-final tie between Nobber and Navan O'Mahonys was originally fixed for Kells on 29/8/1986. However O'Mahonys failed to fulfil the fixture due to the unavailability of Joe Cassells who sustained an injury in the All-Ireland semi-final against Kerry. A vote was subsequently taken by the Meath County Board on Monday 1/9/1986 to decide if O'Mahonys would concede the tie. The voting finished at 20 each before Chairman Fintan Ginnity ruled that the game be re-fixed. This game was fixed for Rathkenny on Sunday 7/9/1986, but it wasn't played. The matter was taken to the Leinster Council on Wednesday 10/9/1986 and they ruled that Navan O'Mahonys be disqualified from the S.F.C. Hence, Nobber were granted a walkover and proceeded to the semifinals.

== Leinster Senior Club Football Championship ==
Preliminary round:

- Summerhill 1–6, 0-9 Kiltegan, Kells, 27/10/1986,
- Summerhill 0-17, 2-3 Kiltegan, Kells, 1/11/1986,

Quarter-final:

- Summerhill 3-9, 1-5 Cashel, Kells, 9/11/1986,

Semi-final:

- Ferbane 2-10, 0-10 Summerhill, St. Conleth's Park, 23/11/1986,
