= 2024 Meath Intermediate Football Championship =

Gaelic Football Intermediate Championship

98th Meath Intermediate Football Championship
Tournament details
- County: Meath
- Province: Leinster
- Year: 2024
- Trophy: Mattie McDonnell Cup
- Sponsor: Meade Potato
- Date: 9 August 2024 - 19 October 2024
- Teams: 16
- Defending champions: Rathkenny

Winners
- Champions: Meath Hill (1st win)
- Manager: Shane McCoy
- Captain: James Mooney

Runners-up
- Runners-up: Navan O'Mahonys
- Manager: Damien Moran & Rory Maguire

Promotion/Relegation
- Promoted team(s): Meath Hill
- Relegated team(s): Nobber

Other
- Matches played: 38
- Website: Meath GAA

The 2024 Meath Intermediate Football Championship was the 98th edition of the Meath GAA's premier club Gaelic football tournament for Intermediate graded teams in County Meath, Ireland. The tournament consisted of 16 teams and started with a group stage before progressing to a knock out stage. The winner will represent Meath in the Leinster Intermediate Club Football Championship.

Rathkenny were the 2023 Meath Intermediate Football Champions after they defeated Duleek in the final. As a result, after having been relegated in the 2019 season, they will compete in the 2024 Meath Senior Football Championship.

Moynalvey were relegated from the Senior Football Championship in 2023 after a 12-year spell within it. Kilbride were promoted to the I.F.C. after beating Clann na nGael in the 2023 Meath Junior Football Championship final. Dunderry were relegated to the 2024 Meath Junior Football Championship.

The draw for the group stages of the championship took place on 20 March 2024 with the games commencing on 9 August 2024.

On 19 October 2024, Meath Hill won their first ever Intermediate Football Championship by Navan O'Mahonys 0–16 to 0–14 in the final after extra time.

Nobber were relegated to the Meath Junior Football Championship after losing to Blackhall Gaels in the relegation play-off final. It will be the first time since 2002 that Nobber will play in the Junior Championship.

== Championship structure ==
The 2024 Meath I.F.C. consisted of 16 teams drawn into four groups each containing four teams. The top two teams progressed to the quarter-finals, while the bottom two in each group contested the Relegation Quarter-Finals. The losers of each Relegation Quarter-Final then contested the Relegation Semi-Finals, the losers of which would play-off for the right to retain their intermediate status into 2025.

== Team changes ==
The following teams changed division since the 2023 championship season.

=== From I.F.C. ===
Promoted to 2024 S.F.C.

- Rathkenny - (Intermediate Champions)

Relegated to 2024 Meath Junior Football Championship

- Dunderry

=== To I.F.C. ===
Relegated from 2023 S.F.C.

- Moynalvey

Promoted from 2023 J.F.C.

- Kilbride - (Junior 'A' Champions)

== Participating teams ==
The teams taking part in the 2024 Meath Intermediate Football Championship are:

Club	Location	Management	2023 Championship Position	2024 Championship Position
Ballivor	Ballivor	Sean Corrigan	Quarter-Finalist	Semi-Finalist
Bective	Navan	David Nolan	Relegation Semi-Finalist	Quarter-Finalist
Blackhall Gaels	Batterstown & Kilcloon		Relegation Quarter-Finalist	Relegation Finalist
Castletown	Castletown-Kilpatrick		Quarter-Finalist	Semi-Finalist
Drumbaragh Emmets	Drumbaragh, Kells	Davy Cahill	Relegation Quarter-Finalist	Relegation Semi-Finalist
Duleek/Bellewstown	Duleek & Bellewstown	Cian Flanagan	Runners-Up	Relegation Quarter-Finalist
Kilbride	Kilbride	Leo Turley	2023 JFC Champions	Quarter-Finalist
Longwood	Longwood	Aaron Ennis	Relegation Finalist	Relegation Quarter-Finalist
Meath Hill	Meath Hill	Shane McCoy	Quarter-Finalist	Champions
Moynalvey	Moynalvey & Kiltale	Caoimhin King	Relegated from 2023 SFC	Quarter-Finalist
Navan O'Mahonys	Navan	Damien Moran & Rory Maguire	Semi-Finalist	Runners-Up
Nobber	Nobber	Martin Morgan	Relegation Semi-Finalist	Relegated to 2025 JFC
Oldcastle	Oldcastle	Brian Donohoe	Relegation Quarter-Finalist	Quarter-Finalist
St. Michael's	Carlanstown & Kilbeg	John Brady	Relegation Quarter-Finalist	Relegation Quarter-Finalist
St. Patrick's	Stamullen	Ronan Kearns & Daithi Whyte	Semi-Finalist	Relegation Quarter-Finalist
Walterstown	Johnstown	Andy McGuinness	Quarter-Finalist	Relegation Semi-Finalist

== Group stage ==
There were four groups of four teams called Group A, B, C and D. The 1st and 2nd placed teams in each group qualified for the quarter-finals. The 3rd and 4th placed team in each group proceeded to the Relegation Play-Off to determine which team would be relegated.

The draws for the group stage of the championship were made on 20 March 2024.

=== Group A ===
Team	Pld	W	L	D	PF	PA	PD	Pts
Meath Hill	3	3	0	0	47	28	+19	6
Bective	3	1	1	1	35	37	-2	4
Blackhall Gaels	3	1	2	0	34	40	-6	2
Nobber	3	0	2	1	36	47	-11	1

Round 1

- Meath Hill 2-9, 1-5 Bective, Drumbaragh, 9/8/2024
- Blackhall Gaels 2-10, 1-8 Nobber, Seneschalstown, 11/8/24

Round 2

- Bective 1-10, 1-6 Blackhall Gaels, Dunshaughlin, 24/8/2024
- Meath Hill 0-17, 1-8 Nobber, Kilmainhamwood, 24/8/2024

Round 3

- Meath Hill 0-16, 1-6 Blackhall Gaels, Duleek, 5/9/2024
- Bective 1–11, 0-14 Nobber, Ballinlough, 5/9/24

=== Group B ===
Team	Pld	W	L	D	PF	PA	PD	Pts
Ballivor	3	2	1	0	48	36	+12	4
Castletown	3	2	1	0	42	38	+4	4
Duleek/Bellewstown	3	2	1	0	34	33	+1	4
Longwood	3	0	3	0	25	42	-17	0

Round 1

- Duleek/Bellewstown 0-11, 1-6 Longwood, Dunsany, 10/8/2024
- Ballivor 1-15, 2-11 Castletown, Bohermeen, 10/8/24

Round 2

- Castletown 1-8, 0-9 Duleek/Bellewstown, Seneschalstown, 24/8/2024
- Ballivor 1-14, 0-5 Longwood, Clonard, 25/8/2024

Round 3

- Duleek/Bellewstown 2-8, 0-13 Ballivor, Batterstown, 6/9/2024
- Castletown 0-14, 1-8 Longwood, Cortown, 6/9/24

=== Group C ===
Team	Pld	W	L	D	PF	PA	PD	Pts
Oldcastle	3	3	0	0	54	22	+32	6
Moynalvey	3	2	1	0	40	43	-3	4
St. Patrick's	3	1	2	0	49	64	-15	2
Drumbaragh Emmets	3	0	3	0	28	42	-14	0

Round 1

- Oldcastle 4-11, 0-10 St. Patrick's, Pairc Tailteann, 10/8/2024
- Moynalvey 1-18, 1-08 Drumbaragh Emmets, Bective, 11/8/24

Round 2

- Moynalvey 0-13, 0-12 St. Patrick's, Pairc Tailteann, 24/8/2024
- Oldcastle 1-8, 0-6 Drumbaragh Emmets, Moylagh, 24/8/2024

Round 3

- Oldcastle 2-14, 0-6 Moynalvey, Simonstown, 7/9/2024
- St. Patrick's 4-9, 1-14 Drumbaragh Emmets, Walterstown, 7/9/24

=== Group D ===
Team	Pld	W	L	D	PF	PA	PD	Pts
Navan O'Mahonys	3	2	1	0	47	36	+13	4
Kilbride	3	2	1	0	45	45	0	4
St. Michaels	3	1	2	0	39	42	-3	2
Walterstown	3	1	2	0	50	58	-8	2

Round 1

- Kilbride 1-12, 1-11 St. Michaels's, Donore, 10/8/2024
- Walterstown 4-11, 2-10 Navan O'Mahonys, Pairc Tailteann, 11/8/24

Round 2

- Navan O'Mahonys 1-11, 0-5 St. Michaels's, Cortown, 23/8/2024
- Kilbride 3-13, 0-14 Walterstown, Ratoath, 24/8/2024

Round 3

- Navan O'Mahonys 1-14, 0-8 Kilbride, Dunsany, 8/9/2024
- St. Michael's 1-17, 1-10 Walterstown, Bohermeen, 8/9/24

== Knock-out stage ==
The 1st and 2nd placed teams in each group qualified for the quarter-finals. Quarter Final pairings were drawn with one group winner and one 2nd placed team in each pair with no repeat pairings from group stages. Semi Final pairings were determined by an open draw. The draw for the Quarter-finals took place on the 8 September 2024 and the draw for the Semi-Finals took place on 22 September 2024.

Quarter-Finals
Ballivor	2-10
Oldcastle	0-10
Meath Hill	3-16
Kilbride	2-9
Navan O'Mahonys	1-14
Bective	1-6
Moynalvey	1-10
Castletown	1-13

Semi-Finals
Ballivor	2-6
Meath Hill	1-12
Navan O'Mahonys	2-9
Castletown	0-9

Final
Meath Hill	0-16
Navan O'Mahonys	0-14

=== Quarter-finals ===
20 September 2024 Quarter-Final 1	Navan O'Mahonys	1-14 (17) – (9) 1-6	Bective	Simonstown
20:00 IST (UTC+1)		(HT: 1-9 - 1-2)
		Report		Referee: Martin Dawson

21 September 2024 Quarter-Final 2	Meath Hill	3-16 (25) – (15) 2-9	Kilbride	Walterstown
15:00 IST (UTC+1)		(HT: 2-12 - 0-5)
		Report		Referee: Martin Dawson

22 September 2024 Quarter-Final 3	Oldcastle	0-10 (10) – (16) 2-10	Ballivor	Trim
12:00 IST (UTC+1)		(HT: 0-4 - 1-4)
		Report		Referee: Robert Purfield

22 September 2024 Quarter-Final 4	Castletown	1-13 (16) – (13) 1-10	Moynalvey	Dunshaughlin
12:00 IST (UTC+1)		(HT: 0-5 - 0-5)
		Report		Referee: Robbie Barrett

=== Semi-finals ===
5 October 2024 Semi-Final 1	Navan O'Mahonys	2-9 (15) – (12) 1-9	Castletown	Navan
14:00 IST (UTC+1)		(HT: 1-5 - 0-4)		Venue: Pairc Tailteann
		Report		Referee: Patrick Coyle

6 October 2024 Semi-Final 2	Meath Hill	1-12 (15) – (12) 2-6	Ballivor	Navan
14:00 IST (UTC+1)		(HT: 0-7 - 0-4)		Venue: Pairc Tailteann
		Report		Referee: Andrew Smith

=== Final ===
19 October 2024 Final	Meath Hill	0-16 (16) – (14) 0-14 (a.e.t.)	Navan O'Mahonys	Navan
12:00 IST (UTC+1)		(HT: 0-5 - 0-4) (FT: 0-12 - 0-12)		Venue: Pairc Tailteann
		Report		Referee: Padraic Coyle

== Relegation play-off ==
The relegation play-off consisted of the 3rd and 4th-placed finishers in each group. The winners of each playoff round retained their intermediate status while the outright loser was relegated to the Junior championship for 2025. The draw for the Relegation Quarter-finals draw took place on 8 September 2024, while the Relegation Semi-finals draw took place on 22 September 2024.

=== Relegation quarter-finals ===
19 September 2024 Relegation Quarter-Final 1	St. Patrick's	1-13 (16) – (15) 1-12	Walterstown	Duleek
20:00 IST (UTC+1)
				Referee: Stephen Cregan

21 September 2024 Relegation Quarter-Final 2	St. Michael's	2-18 (24) – (8) 0-8	Nobber	Moynalty
13:00 IST (UTC+1)		(HT: 0-12 - 0-4)
		Report		Referee: Liam Reddy

21 September 2024 Relegation Quarter-Final 3	Blackhall Gaels	0-11 (11) – (16) 1-13 (a.e.t.)	Longwood	Summerhill
15:00 IST (UTC+1)		(HT: 0-4 - 1-5) (FT: 0-10 - 1-7)
		Report		Referee: Stephan Cregan

21 September 2024 Relegation Quarter-Final 4	Duleek/Bellewstown	4-17 (29) – (9) 0-9	Drumbaragh Emmets	Seneschalstown
12:00 IST (UTC+1)		(HT: 2-10 - 0-5)
		Report		Referee: Andrew Lenehan

=== Relegation semi-finals ===
5 October 2024 Relegation Semi-Final 1	Drumbaragh Emmets	1-15 (18) – (12) 0-12	Blackhall Gaels	Navan
18:30 IST (UTC+1)		(HT: 1-8 - 0-5)
				Referee: Patrick Clarke

6 October 2024 Relegation Semi-Final 2	Nobber	2-6 (12) – (19) 2-13	Walterstown	Simonstown
11:00 IST (UTC+1)		(HT: 1-3 - 0-5)
		Report		Referee: Robert Purfield

=== Relegation final ===
17 October 2024 Relegation Final	Nobber	0-6 (6) – (14) 1-11	Blackhall Gaels	Cortown
20:00 IST (UTC+1)		(HT: 0-3 - 0-3)
		Report
