= 1989 Meath Intermediate Football Championship =

Gaelic football tournament

Meath I.F.C.
- Season: 1989
- Champions: St. Michael's; 1st Intermediate Football Championship title
- Relegated: Duleek; Ratoath
- Matches: ??

The 1989 Meath Intermediate Football Championship is the 63rd edition of the Meath GAA's premier club Gaelic football tournament for intermediate graded teams in County Meath, Ireland. The tournament consists of 22 teams. The championship starts with a group stage and then progresses to a knock out stage.

This was Ballinlough's return to the grade as they were promoted from the J.F.C. after claiming the 1988 Meath Junior Football Championship title.

St. Patrick's were regraded from the S.F.C. last year, and returned to the middle grade after a 25-year stint in senior football.

On 24 September 1989, St. Michael's claimed their 1st Intermediate championship title when they defeated Dunderry 0–11 to 0–9 in the final at Pairc Tailteann, and condemning Dunderry to their 3rd consecutive final defeat.

Duleek were regraded to the J.F.C. for 1990 after 9 years as an Intermediate club. Ratoath also lost their middle grade status and returned to the Junior ranks for the first time in 19 years.

== Team changes ==
The following teams have changed division since the 1988 championship season.

=== From I.F.C. ===
Promoted to S.F.C.

- St. Colmcille's - (Intermediate Champions)

Relegated to J.A.F.C.

- n/a

=== To I.F.C. ===
Regraded from S.F.C.

- St. Patrick's

Promoted from J.A.F.C.

- Ballinlough - (Junior 'A' Champions)

== Group stage ==
There are 4 groups called Group A, B, C and D. The top two finishers in all groups will qualify for the quarter finals.

=== Group A ===
Team	Pld	W	L	D	PF	PA	PD	Pts
Navan O'Mahonys 'B'	5	4	0	1	0	0	+0	9
St. Mary's Donore	5	3	0	2	0	0	+0	8
Dunsany	5	3	1	1	0	0	+0	7
Bellewstown	5	2	3	0	0	0	+0	4
Ballivor	5	1	4	0	0	0	+0	2
Duleek	5	0	5	0	0	0	+0	0

Round 1:

- Dunsany 2-10, 0-9 Ballivor, 23/4/1989,
- Navan O'Mahonys 'B' w, l Bellewstown,
- St. Mary's w, l Duleek,

Round 2:

- Navan O'Mahonys 'B' 2-8, 1-4 Ballivor, 14/5/1989,
- St. Mary's 0–6, 0-6 Dunsany, 14/5/1989,
- Bellewstown 3-5, 1-8 Duleek, 14/5/1989,

Round 3:

- Navan O'Mahonys 'B' 2–4, 1-7 St. Mary's, 25/6/1989,
- Dunsany w, l Duleek,
- Bellewstown w, l Ballivor,

Round 4:

- St. Mary's w, l Ballivor,
- Navan O'Mahonys 'B' w, l Duleek,
- Dunsany w, l Bellewstown,

Round 5:

- St. Mary's 3-10, 0-9 Bellewstown, 9/7/1989,
- Navan O'Mahonys 'B' 3-9, 1-3 Dunsany, 16/7/1989,
- Ballivor w/o, scr Duleek,

=== Group B ===
Team	Pld	W	L	D	PF	PA	PD	Pts
St. Michael's	5	4	1	0	0	0	+0	8
St. Patrick's	5	3	2	0	0	0	+0	6
Ballinabrackey	5	2	1	1	0	0	+0	5
Ballinlough	5	2	2	1	0	0	+0	5
Syddan	5	2	3	0	0	0	+0	4
Ratoath	5	0	5	0	0	0	+0	0

Round 1:

- St. Michael's w, l Ballinlough,
- St. Patrick's w, l Syddan,
- Ballinabrackey w, l Ratoath,

Round 2:

- St. Michael's 2-8, 0-12 Ballinabrackey, 14/5/1989,
- St. Patrick's 3-6, 2-7 Ballinlough, 14/5/1989,
- Syddan 4-5, 0-7 Ratoath, 14/5/1989,

Round 3:

- Ballinabrackey 4-8, 2-9 St. Patrick's, 25/6/1989,
- Ballinlough 3-14, 2-8 Syddan, 2/7/1989,
- St. Michael's 4-13, 1-2 Ratoath, Seneschalstown, 5/7/1989,

Round 4:

- St. Michael's w, l St. Patrick's,
- Syddan w, l Ballinabrackey,
- Ballinlough w, l Ratoath,

Round 5:

- Ballinabrackey 1–12, 4-3 Ballinlough, Pairc Tailteann, 16/7/1989,
- St. Michael's w/o, scr Syddan,
- St. Patrick's w/o scr Ratoath,

=== Group C ===
Team	Pld	W	L	D	PF	PA	PD	Pts
Dunderry	4	4	0	0	0	0	+0	8
Kilmainhamwood	4	3	1	0	0	0	+0	6
Dunshaughlin	4	2	2	0	0	0	+0	4
Meath Hill	4	0	3	1	0	0	+0	1
Rathkenny	4	0	3	1	0	0	+0	1

Round 1:

- Dunshaughlin 0-7, 0-6 Meath Hill,
- Dunderry w, l Rathkenny,
- Kilmainhamwood - Bye,

Round 2:

- Dunshaughlin w, l Rathkenny, 14/5/1989,
- Dunderry w, l Kilmainhamwood,
- Meath Hill - Bye,

Round 3:

- Dunderry 1-10, 0-10 Dunshaughlin, 21/5/1989,
- Kilmainhamwood 0-12, 1-5 Meath Hill, 21/5/1989,
- Rathkenny - Bye,

Round 4:

- Meath Hill 0–5, 0-5 Rathkenny, Castletown, 5/7/1989,
- Kilmainhamwood 0-10, 0-7 Dunshaughlin, Pairc Tailteann, 9/7/1989,
- Dunderry - Bye,

Round 5:

- Kilmainhamwood w/o, scr Rathkenny,
- Dunderry w, l Meath Hill,
- Dunshaughlin - Bye,

=== Group D ===
Team	Pld	W	L	D	PF	PA	PD	Pts
Martry Harps	4	3	0	1	0	0	+0	7
Moynalty	4	3	1	0	0	0	+0	6
Donaghmore	4	2	2	0	0	0	+0	4
Athboy	4	1	3	0	0	0	+0	2
Wolfe Tones	4	0	3	1	0	0	+0	1

Round 1:

- Martry Harps d, d Wolfe Tones,
- Moynalty 3-9, 2-3 Donaghmore,
- Athboy - Bye,

Round 2:

- Martry Harps 0-6, 0-4 Moynalty, 14/5/1989,
- Athboy 4-12, 1-7 Wolfe Tones, 14/5/1989,
- Donaghmore - Bye,

Round 3:

- Donaghmore 2-8, 1-10 Athboy, 25/6/1989,
- Moynalty w, l Wolfe Tones,
- Martry Harps - Bye,

Round 4:

- Donaghmore 1-14, 1-4 Wolfe Tones, 2/7/1989,
- Martry Harps w, l Athboy,
- Moynalty - Bye,

Round 5:

- Moynalty 1-10, 1-7 Athboy, Kells, 5/7/1989,
- Martry Harps w, l Donaghmore,
- Wolfe Tones - Bye.

== Knock-out Stages ==
=== Finals ===
The teams in the quarter-finals are the top two finishers from each group.

Quarter-Finals
Navan O'Mahonys 'B'	1-10
St. Patrick's	0-12
Dunderry	w
Moynalty	l
St. Michael's	1-8
Kilmainhamwood	0-9
Martry Harps	1-8
St. Mary's	0-7

Semi-Finals
Navan O'Mahonys 'B'	0-5
Dunderry	0-12
St. Michael's	3-8
Martry Harps	2-9

Final
Dunderry	0-9
St. Michael's	0-11

Quarter Final:

- St. Michael's 1-8, 0-9 Kilmainhamwood, Kells, 19/8/1989,
- Navan O'Mahonys 'B' 1-10, 0-12 St. Patrick's, Donore, 19/8/1989,
- Martry Harps 1-8, 0-7 St. Mary's, Rathkenny, 20/8/1989,
- Dunderry w, l Moynalty, Carlanstown, 20/8/1989,

Semi Final:

- Dunderry 0-12, 0-5 Navan O'Mahonys, Kells, 10/9/1989,
- St. Michael's 3-8, 2-9 Martry Harps, Kilberry, 10/9/1989,

Final:

- St. Michael's 0-11, 0-9 Dunderry, Pairc Tailteann, 24/9/1989,
