= 1987 Meath Intermediate Football Championship =

Meath I.F.C.
- Season: 1987
- Champions: Oldcastle; 1st Intermediate Football Championship title
- Relegated: n/a
- Matches: ??

The 1987 Meath Intermediate Football Championship is the 61st edition of the Meath GAA's premier club Gaelic football tournament for intermediate graded teams in County Meath, Ireland. The tournament consists of 19 teams. The championship starts with a group stage and then progresses to a knock out stage.

This was Bellewstown's first ever year the grade as they were promoted from the J.F.C. after claiming the 1986 Meath Junior Football Championship title, beating Simonstown Gaels in the final.

Ballivor were relegated from the S.F.C. last year, and returned to the middle grade after a 5-year absence.

On 18 October 1987, Oldcastle claimed their 1st Intermediate championship title when they defeated Dunderry 5–6 to 3–4 in the final at Kells.

== Team changes ==
The following teams have changed division since the 1986 championship season.

=== From I.F.C. ===
Promoted to S.F.C.

- Gaeil Colmcille - (Intermediate Champions)

Relegated to J.A.F.C.

- n/a

=== To I.F.C. ===
Regraded from S.F.C.

- Ballivor

Promoted from J.A.F.C.

- Bellewstown - (Junior 'A' Champions)

== Group stage ==
There are 4 groups called Group A, B, C and D. The top two finishers in all groups will qualify for the quarter-finals.

=== Group A ===
Team	Pld	W	L	D	PF	PA	PD	Pts
St. Michael's	4	4	0	0	48	30	+18	8
Dunderry	4	2	1	1	46	38	+8	5
Duleek	4	2	2	0	31*	32*	-1*	4
Athboy	4	1	2	1	25	39	-14	3
Ballivor	4	0	4	0	12*	21*	-9*	0

Round 1:

- Duleek 2-9, 1-4 Athboy, Seneschalstown, 6/5/1987,
- Dunderry 1-7, 0-7 Ballivor, Athboy, 17/5/1987,
- St. Michael's - Bye,

Round 2:

- St. Michael's 0-11, 0-5 Ballivor, 31/5/1987,
- Dunderry 2–4, 2-4 Athboy, 7/6/1987,
- Duleek - Bye,

Round 3:

- St. Michael's 0-14, 1-5 Athboy, Kells, 5/7/1987,
- Dunderry 2-11, 1-5 Duleek,
- Ballivor - Bye,

Round 4:

- St. Michael's 1-10, 1-6 Dunderry, Kells, 10/7/1987,
- Duleek w, l Ballivor,
- Athboy - Bye,

Round 5:

- St. Michael's 1-7, 1-5 Duleek, Rathkenny, 31/7/1987,
- Athboy w/o, scr Ballivor,
- Dunderry - Bye,

=== Group B ===
Team	Pld	W	L	D	PF	PA	PD	Pts
Oldcastle	4	3	1	0	56	31	+25	6
St. Mary's Donore	4	3	1	0	43	38	+5	6
Kilmainhamwood	4	3	1	0	27	31	-4	6
Wolfe Tones	4	1	3	0	31	45	-14	2
Rathkenny	4	0	4	0	25	37	-12	0

Round 1:

- Kilmainhamwood 1-5, 0-6 Wolfe Tones, Kells, 3/5/1987,
- Oldcastle 2-10, 1-2 St. Mary's, Kells, 10/5/1987,
- Rathkenny - Bye,

Round 2:

- St. Mary's 1-11, 2-2 Rathkenny, Seneschalstown, 17/5/1987,
- Oldcastle 2-12, 1-5 Wolfe Tones, Kilskyre, 17/5/1987,
- Kilmainhamwood - Bye,

Round 3:

- Wolfe Tones 0-11, 1-7 Rathkenny, 31/5/1987,
- Kilmainhamwood 0-11, 0-10 Oldcastle, 7/6/1987,
- St. Mary's - Bye,

Round 4:

- Oldcastle 1-9, 1-4 Rathkenny, 21/6/1987,
- St. Mary's 2-9, 0-8 Kilmainhamwood, Syddan, 5/7/1987,
- Wolfe Tones - Bye,

Round 5:

- St. Mary's 0-9, 1-3 Wolfe Tones, Rathkenny, 10/7/1987,
- Kilmainhamwood w/o, scr Rathkenny,
- Oldcastle - Bye,

Quarter-final Playoff:

- Oldcastle 2-7, 0-6 St. Mary's, Martry, 31/7/1987,
- St. Mary's 1-8, 1-7 Kilmainhamwood, Rathkenny, 30/8/1987,

=== Group C ===
Team	Pld	W	L	D	PF	PA	PD	Pts
Navan O'Mahonys 'B'	4	4	0	0	49	27	+22	8
St. Colmcille's	4	3	1	0	47	34	+13	6
Meath Hill	4	1	3	0	39	45	-6	2
Ratoath	4	1	3	0	36	45	-9	2
Donaghmore	4	1	3	0	31	51	-20	2

Round 1:

- Ratoath 2-8, 1-8 Donaghmore, Skryne, 3/5/1987,
- Navan O'Mahonys 'B' 1-10, 1-6 Meath Hill, Kells, 12/5/1987,
- St. Colmcille's - Bye,

Round 2:

- Navan O'Mahonys 'B' 0-7, 0-5 St. Colmcille's, ???, 24/5/1987,
- Donaghmore 1-6, 0-8 Meath Hill, ???, 24/5/1987,
- Ratoath - Bye,

Round 3:

- Meath Hill 1-7, 0-5 Ratoath, ???, 31/5/1987,
- St. Colmcille's 1-11, 1-4 Donaghmore, ???, 7/6/1987,
- Navan O'Mahonys 'B' - Bye,

Round 4:

- Navan O'Mahonys 'B' 0-14, 1-6 Ratoath, ???, 21/6/1987,
- St. Colmcille's 2-12, 2-6 Meath Hill, Seneschalstown, 5/7/1987,
- Donaghmore - Bye,

Round 5:

- Navan O'Mahonys 'B' 1-12, 0-4 Donaghmore, Seneschalstown, 5/7/1987,
- St. Colmcille's 1-7, 1-5 Ratoath, Bellewstown, 10/7/1987,
- Meath Hill - Bye,

=== Group D ===
Team	Pld	W	L	D	PF	PA	PD	Pts
Dunsany	3	2	1	0	34	27	+7	4
Bellewstown	3	2	1	0	36	30	+6	4
Dunshaughlin	3	2	1	0	18*	21*	-3*	4
Ballinabrackey	3	0	3	0	12*	22*	-10*	0

Round 1:

- Dunshaughlin 1-6, 1-5 Dunsany, Skryne, 7/5/1987,
- Bellewstown 2-5, 0-6 Ballinabrackey, Summerhill, 3/5/1987,

Round 2:

- Dunsany 1-8, 0-6 Ballinabrackey, ???, 21/6/1987,
- Bellewstown 1-10, 0-9 Dunshaughlin, Skryne, 12/7/1987,

Round 3:

- Dunsany 2-9, 2-6 Bellewstown, Duleek, 5/7/1987,
- Dunshaughlin w, l Ballinabrackey,

== Knock-out Stages ==
=== Finals ===
The teams in the quarter-finals are the top two finishers from each group.

Quarter-Finals
St. Colmcille's	2-10
St. Michael's	1-6
Oldcastle	3-11
Bellewstown	1-6
Navan O'Mahonys 'B'	1-7
Dunderry	2-7
Dunsany	1-5 R
St. Mary's	1-13 R

Semi-Finals
St. Colmcille's	0-7
Oldcastle	1-11
Dunderry	3-9
St. Mary's	1-7

Final
Oldcastle	5-6
Dunderry	3-4

Quarter-final:

- St. Colmcille's 2-10, 1-6 St. Michael's, Seneschalstown, 30/8/1987,
- Oldcastle 3-11, 1-6 Bellewstown, Rathkenny, 30/8/1987,
- Dunderry 2-7, 1-7 Navan O'Mahonys 'B', Seneschalstown, 30/8/1987,
- St. Mary's 0–9, 0-9 Dunsany, Seneschalstown, 27/9/1987,

Quarter-final Replay:

- St. Mary's 1-13, 1-5 Dunsany, Walterstown, 4/10/1987,

Semi-final:

- Oldcastle 1-11, 0-7 St. Colmcille's, Seneschalstown, 27/9/1987,
- Dunderry 3-9, 1-7 St. Mary's, Walterstown, 11/10/1987,

Final:

- Oldcastle 5-6, 3-4 Dunderry, Kells, 30/10/1986,
