= 1956 Meath Intermediate Football Championship =

Meath I.F.C.
- Season: 1956
- Champions: Navan O'Mahonys 'B'; 1st Intermediate Football Championship title
- Relegated: Ballinabrackey; Clonard; Curraha; Kilcloon; Dunshaughlin (folded)

The 1956 Meath Intermediate Football Championship is the 30th edition of the Meath GAA's premier club Gaelic football tournament for intermediate graded teams in County Meath, Ireland. The tournament consists of 12 teams. The championship format consists of a group stage before progressing to a knock-out stage.

Fordstown were regraded from the 1955 S.F.C.

At the end of the season Ballinabrackey, Clonard, Curraha and Kilcloon all applied to be regraded to the 1957 J.A.F.C. Dunshaughlin (Intermediate finalists this season) decided not to field a team in either the 1957 S.F.C. or I.F.C. They did enter a team in the Meath J.F.C. Eastern Division in 1957.

On 14 October 1956, Navan O'Mahonys 'B' claimed their 1st Intermediate championship title (for the club as a whole) when they defeated Dunshaughlin 3-6 to 0-5 in the final replay at Trim. They couldn't be promoted to senior level however due to the rule that a club cannot enter two teams in the one grade.

== Team changes ==
The following teams have changed division since the 1955 championship season.

=== From I.F.C. ===
Promoted to 1956 S.F.C.

- Duleek

Relegated to 1956 J.A.F.C.

- Donore
- Enfield
- Oldcastle
- St. Patrick's

=== To I.F.C. ===
Regraded from 1955 S.F.C.

- Fordstown

Promoted from 1956 J.F.C.

- Curraha - (Junior Runners-Up & East Divisional Champions)
- Kilberry - (Junior Semi-Finalists & North Divisional Champions)
- Clonard - (Junior Semi-Finalists & South Divisional Champions)
- Kilcloon - (Junior Semi-Finalists & South Divisional Finalists)

== Group stage ==
There are 2 groups called Group A and B. The top finisher in each group will qualify for the Final. Many results were unavailable in the Meath Chronicle.

=== Group A ===
Team	Pld	W	L	D	PF	PA	PD	Pts
Navan O'Mahonys 'B'	5	3	1	1	0	0	+0	7
Drumbaragh	5	3	1	1	0	0	+0	7
Slane	5	3	2	0	0	0	+0	6
Fordstown	5	2	3	0	0	0	+0	4
Kilberry	5	1	4	0	0	0	+0	2
Shale Rovers	5	0	5	0	0	0	+0	0

Round 1:

- Drumbaragh 3-6, 0-6 Kilberry, Kells, 4/3/1956,
- Slane w, l Shale Rovers, Newtown, 4/3/1956,
- Navan O'Mahonys 'B' 2-7, 3-3 Fordstown, Kells, 11/3/1956,

Round 2:

- Kilberry 2-4, 0-0 Fordstown, Kells, 18/3/1956,
- Slane 4-2, 1-1 Navan O'Mahonys 'B', Yellow Furze, 25/3/1956,
- Drumbaragh w, l Shale Rovers, Cross Guns, 25/3/1956,

Round 3:

- Kilberry 1-4, 0-4 Slane, Pairc Tailteann, 1/4/1956,
- Navan O'Mahonys 'B' 2-4, 1-4 Shale Rovers, Kells, 29/4/1956,
- Drumbaragh 0-9, 0-5 Fordstown, Kells, 6/5/1956,

Round 4:

- Fordstown w, l Shale Rovers, Kells, 3/6/1956,
- Slane 2-8, 1-5 Drumbaragh, Pairc Tailteann, 17/6/1956,
- Navan O'Mahonys 'B' 4-3, 1-3 Kilberry, Kells, 15/7/1956,

Round 5:

- Fordstown w, l Slane, Pairc Tailteann, 1/7/1956,
- Navan O'Mahonys 'B' 0-3, 0-3 Drumbaragh, Kells, 29/7/1956,
- Kilberry w/o, scr Shale Rovers,

Final Play-Off:

- Navan O'Mahonys 'B' 1-7, 1-4 Drumbaragh, Kells, 19/8/1956,

=== Group B ===
Team	Pld	W	L	D	PF	PA	PD	Pts
Dunshaughlin	5	5	0	0	0	0	+0	10
Ballinabrackey	3	2	1	0	0	0	+0	4
Summerhill	1	0	1	0	0	0	+0	0
Curraha	3	1	2	0	0	0	+0	2
Clonard	3	0	3	0	0	0	+0	0
Kilcloon	1	0	1	0	0	0	+0	0

Round 1:

- Ballinabrackey +1, -1 Curraha, Trim, 4/3/1956,
- Dunshaughlin w, l Summerhill, Warrenstown, 4/3/1956,
- Clonard -vs- Kilcloon, Enfield, 5/5/1956,

Round 2:

- Ballinabrackey 5-3, 1-2 Clonard, Killyon, 11/3/1956,
- Dunshaughlin w, l Curraha, Ratoath, 11/3/1956,
- Summerhill -vs- Kilcloon,

Round 3:

- Dunshaughlin w, l Kilcloon, Summerhill, 25/3/1956,
- Curraha w, l Clonard, Summerhill, 25/3/1956,
- Ballinabrackey -vs- Summerhill, Killyon, 25/3/1956,

Round 4:

- Dunshaughlin w, l Ballinabrackey, Enfield, 6/5/1956,
- Summerhill -vs- Clonard, Trim, 10/6/1956,
- Curraha -vs- Kilcloon,

Round 5:

- Dunshaughlin w, l Clonard, Trim, 17/6/1956,
- Summerhill -vs- Curraha,
- Ballinabrackey -vs- Kilcloon,

== Final ==
- Navan O'Mahonys 'B' 1-6, 1-6 Dunshaughlin, Trim, 9/9/1956,
- Navan O'Mahonys 'B' 3-6, 0-5 Dunshaughlin, Trim, 14/10/1956, (Replay).
