= 1985 Meath Intermediate Football Championship =

Meath I.F.C.
- Season: 1985
- Champions: Martry Harps; 1st Intermediate Football Championship title
- Relegated: Moylagh
- Matches: ??

The 1985 Meath Intermediate Football Championship is the 59th edition of the Meath GAA's premier club Gaelic football tournament for intermediate graded teams in County Meath, Ireland. The tournament consists of 18 teams. The championship starts with a group stage and then progresses to a knock out stage.

This was Rathkenny's return to the grade after a 2-year absence as they were promoted after claiming the 1984 Meath Junior Football Championship title. They were previously relegated from the I.F.C. in 1983 under the name Grove Emmets.

This was Gaeil Colmcille's first time ever in the middle grade as they had spent 21 years in the top flight of Meath football since being founded in 1964 from the Kells parish clubs of Kells Harps, Kilmainham and Drumbaragh. Martinstown/Athboy returned to the I.F.C. 5 years of playing senior football.

On 3 November 1985, Martry Harps claimed their 1st Intermediate championship title when they defeated St. Mary's Donore 1–8 to 1–2 in a final replay.

Moylagh were relegated to the J.F.C. and hence ending their 8-year stay in the middle grade since being regraded from the S.F.C. in 1977. They previously won an I.F.C. title in 1975 and reached two finals in 1971 and 1973.

== Team changes ==
The following teams have changed division since the 1984 championship season.

=== From I.F.C. ===
Promoted to S.F.C.

- Slane - (Intermediate Champions)

Relegated to J.A.F.C.

- Walterstown 'B'

=== To I.F.C. ===
Regraded from S.F.C.

- Gaeil Colmcille
- Martinstown/Athboy

Promoted from J.A.F.C.

- Rathkenny - (Junior 'A' Champions)

== Group stage ==
There are 3 groups called Group A, B and C. The top finishers in Group A and B will qualify for the semi-finals. First place in Group C along with the runners-up in all the groups qualify for the quarter-finals.

=== Group A ===
Team	Pld	W	L	D	PF	PA	PD	Pts
Martry Harps	5	4	1	0	64	49	+15	8
St. Michael's	5	3	2	0	46	44	+2	6
Navan O'Mahonys 'B'	5	3	2	0	38*	42*	-4*	6
Gaeil Colmcille	5	2	2	1	36*	26*	+10*	5
St. Colmcille's	5	2	3	0	65	53	+8	4
Dunderry	5	0	4	1	43	73	-30	1

Round 1:

- Martry Harps 1-12, 0-2 Navan O'Mahonys 'B', 14/4/1985,
- Gaeil Colmcille 0-12, 0-4 St. Michael's, 14/4/1985,
- St. Colmcille's 1-11, 2-4 Dunderry, 14/4/1985,

Round 2:

- St. Michael's 1-9, 0-6 Martry Harps, 28/4/1985,
- Navan O'Mahonys 'B' 2-9, 0-11 St. Colmcille's, 28/4/1985,
- Gaeil Colmcille 0–6, 0-6 Dunderry, 28/4/1985,

Round 3:

- Martry Harps 1-11, 2-6 Dunderry, 5/5/1985,
- Gaeil Colmcille 0-10, 1-5 St. Colmcille's, 5/5/1985,
- St. Michael's 1-5, 0-2 Navan O'Mahonys 'B',

Round 4:

- Navan O'Mahonys 4-7, 0-8 Dunderry, 26/5/1985,
- St. Colmcille's 2-11, 0-2 St. Michael's, 9/6/1985,
- Martry Harps 1-10, 1-5 Gaeil Colmcille, 16/6/1985,

Round 5:

- St. Michael's 2-14, 2-1 Dunderry, 16/6/1985,
- Martry Harps 1-13, 3-6 St. Colmcille's, 15/9/1985,
- Navan O'Mahonys 'B' w, l Gaeil Colmcille,

=== Group B ===
Team	Pld	W	L	D	PF	PA	PD	Pts
Meath Hill	5	5	0	0	54	38	+16	10
Martinstown/Athboy	5	3	2	0	39*	31*	+8*	6
Rathkenny	5	3	2	0	65	50	+15	6
Duleek	5	3	2	0	45*	34*	+11*	6
Moylagh	5	1	4	0	27	53	-26	2
Dunshaughlin	5	0	5	0	38	62	-24	0

Round 1:

- Meath Hill 1-6, 0-7 Dunshaughlin, 14/4/1985,
- Martinstown/Athboy 0-9, 0-1 Moylagh, 14/4/1985,
- Rathkenny 3-7, 3-4 Duleek, 14/4/1985,

Round 2:

- Meath Hill 1-3, 0-3 Duleek, 28/4/1985,
- Martinstown/Athboy 0-9, 1-5 Rathkenny, 28/4/1985,
- Moylagh 2-6, 1-6 Dunshaughlin, 28/4/1985,

Round 3:

- Meath Hill 4-5, 2-4 Rathkenny, 5/5/1985,
- Duleek 4-5, 1-2 Moylagh, 5/5/1985,
- Martinstown/Athboy 0-9, 0-7 Dunshaughlin, 19/5/1985,

Round 4:

- Duleek 2-6, 1-4 Dunshaughlin, 26/5/1985,
- Rathkenny 0-11, 0-3 Moylagh, 26/5/1985,
- Meath Hill 1-12, 2-6 Martinstown/Athboy, 16/6/1985,

Round 5:

- Meath Hill 0-7, 0-6 Moylagh, 7/7/1985,
- Rathkenny 3-11, 0-8 Dunshaughlin, 7/7/1985,
- Duleek w, l Martinstown/Athboy,

Quarter-final Playoffs:

- Rathkenny 2-8, 0-7 Duleek, 14/7/1985,
- Martinstown/Athboy 0–10, 1-7 Rathkenny, 25/8/1985,
- Martinstown/Athboy 0-10, 0-2 Rathkenny, 15/9/1985,

=== Group C ===
Team	Pld	W	L	D	PF	PA	PD	Pts
Ratoath	5	5	0	0	39	22	+17	10
St. Mary's Donore	5	4	1	0	47	40	+7	8
Donaghmore	5	3	2	0	48	41	+7	6
Wolfe Tones	5	2	3	0	20*	18*	+2*	4
Dunsany	5	1	4	0	29	48	-19	2
Oldcastle	5	0	5	0	19	33	-14	0

Round 1:

- Ratoath 1-6, 1-4 Donaghmore, 14/4/1985,
- St. Mary's 2-5, 1-7 Dunsany, 14/4/1985,
- Wolfe Tones 0-9, 1-3 Oldcastle, 14/4/1985,

Round 2:

- Ratoath 1-8, 0-7 St. Mary's, 28/4/1985,
- Wolfe Tones 0-7, 0-2 Dunsany, 28/4/1985,
- Donaghmore 1-7, 0-4 Oldcastle, 28/4/1985,

Round 3:

- Donaghmore 2-4, 0-4 Wolfe Tones, 5/5/1985,
- St. Mary's 2-8, 2-3 Oldcastle, 19/5/1985,
- Ratoath 3-10, 1-5 Dunsany, 19/5/1985,

Round 4:

- Donaghmore 0-11, 2-3 Dunsany, 26/5/1985,
- Ratoath w/o, scr Oldcastle, 26/5/1985,
- St. Mary's w, l Wolfe Tones,

Round 5:

- St. Mary's 1-12, 0-10 Donaghmore, 10/6/1985,
- Ratoath w/o, scr Wolfe Tones,
- Dunsany w/o scr Oldcastle,

== Knock-out Stages ==
=== Finals ===
The teams in the quarter-finals are the second placed teams from each group and the Group C winner. The teams in the semi-finals are Group A and B winners along with the quarter-final winners.

Quarter-finals
Ratoath	l
Martinstown/Athboy	w
St. Mary's	w
St. Michael's	l

Semi-finals
Martry Harps	2-6
Martinstown/Athboy	0-6
Meath Hill	l
St. Mary's	w

Final
Martry Harps	1-8 R
St. Mary's	1-2 R

Quarter-finals:

- Martinstown/Athboy w, l Ratoath,
- St. Mary's w, l St. Michael's,

Semi-finals:

- Martry Harps 2-6, 0-6 Martinstown/Athboy,
- St. Mary's w, l Meath Hill,

Final:

- Martry Harps 1–5, 1-5 St. Mary's, 3/11/1985,

Final Replay:

- Martry Harps 1-8, 1-2 St. Mary's, 10/11/1985
