= Cormac McGuinness =

Irish Gaelic footballer

Personal information
- Born: Navan, County Meath

Sport
- Sport: Gaelic Football
- Position: Full-back/Midfield
Club
- Years: Club
- 2005-: Navan O'Mahonys
Club titles
- Leinster titles: 1
Inter-county
Years	County	Apps (scores)
2007-	Meath	11 (0-01)
Inter-county titles
- Leinster titles: 1

Cormac McGuinness is an Irish Gaelic footballer. He plays with his local club, Navan O'Mahonys, and has been a senior member of the Meath county team since 2007.

McGuinness made his championship debut in June 2007 during the Leinster Quarter-final replay against Dublin, coming on as a substitute.
