= 1989 Meath Senior Football Championship =

Meath S.F.C.
- Season: 1989
- Champions: Navan O'Mahonys; 14th Senior Championship Title
- Relegated: n/a
- Leinster SCFC: Navan O'Mahonys (Semi-Final) Thomas Davis 0-15, Navan O'Mahonys 0-9.
- All Ireland SCFC: n/a
- Winning Captain: Finian Murtagh (Navan O'Mahonys)
- Man of the Match: Colm O'Rourke (Skryne)

The 1989 Meath Senior Football Championship is the 97th edition of the Meath GAA's premier club Gaelic football tournament for senior graded teams in County Meath, Ireland. The tournament consists of 13 teams, with the winner going on to represent Meath in the Leinster Senior Club Football Championship. The championship starts with a group stage and then progresses to a knock out stage.

This was St. Colmcille's first year ever as a senior club after claiming the 1988 Meath Intermediate Football Championship title.

Navan O'Mahonys were the defending champions after they defeated Walterstown in the previous years final, and they successfully defended their title to claim their 14th S.F.C. title (their 3rd in a row) when beating Skryne 0–17 to 3–6 in the final at Pairc Tailteann on 1 October 1989. Finian Murtagh raised the Keegan Cup for O'Mahonys while Colm O'Rourke of Skryne claimed the 'Man of the Match' award, becoming the first man to claim this accolade after losing the final.

No team was relegated from the S.F.C. this year.

== Team changes ==
The following teams have changed division since the 1988 championship season.

=== To S.F.C. ===
Promoted from I.F.C.

- St. Colmcille's - (Intermediate Champions)

=== From S.F.C. ===
Regraded to I.F.C.

- St. Patrick's

== Group stage ==
=== Group A ===
Team	Pld	W	L	D	PF	PA	PD	Pts
Skryne	3	2	0	1	40	24	+16	5
Trim	3	2	0	1	28	16	+12	5
Slane	3	1	2	0	20	20	+0	2
Castletown	3	0	3	0	8	36	-28	0

Round 1

- Skryne 2–5, 2-5 Trim, 23/4/1989,
- Slane 1-6, 0-1 Castletown, 23/4/1989,

Round 2

- Skryne 1-7, 0-8 Slane, 14/5/1989,
- Trim 1-5, 0-2 Castletown, 14/5/1989,

Round 3

- Skryne 2-13, 1-2 Castletown, 25/6/1989,
- Trim 0-9, 0-3 Slane, 25/6/1989,

=== Group B ===
Team	Pld	W	L	D	PF	PA	PD	Pts
Nobber	3	2	0	1	20	18	+2	5
Summerhill	3	1	0	2	25	21	+4	4
Oldcastle	3	1	1	1	20*	13*	+7	3
Gaeil Colmcille	3	0	3	0	23	36	-13	0

Round 1

- Nobber 0–8, 0-8 Summerhill, Dunderry, 18/6/1989,
- Oldcastle 1-11, 0-6 Gaeil Colmcille, 18/6/1989,

Round 2

- Nobber 0-5, 0-4 Gaeil Colmcille, 14/5/1989,
- Summerhill d, d Oldcastle,

Round 3

- Nobber 0-7, 0-6 Oldcastle, 21/5/1989,
- Summerhill 1-14, 2-7 Gaeil Colmcille, 21/5/1989,

=== Group C ===
Team	Pld	W	L	D	PF	PA	PD	Pts
Walterstown	4	3	1	0	23*	26*	-3*	6
Navan O'Mahonys	4	3	1	0	54	34	+20	6
Seneschalstown	4	3	1	0	61	34	+27	6
St. Colmcille's	4	1	3	0	15*	40*	-25*	2
Moynalvey	4	0	4	0	21	40	-19	0

Round 1

- Navan O'Mahonys 0-11, 0-10 Seneschalstown,
- Walterstown 0-7, 1-2 Moynalvey,
- St. Colmcille's - Bye,

Round 2

- Navan O'Mahonys 1-11, 0-6 Moynalvey,
- Walterstown w, l St. Colmcille's,
- Seneschalstown - Bye,

Round 3

- Navan O'Mahonys 3-12, 1-5 St. Colmcille's,
- Seneschalstown 2-13, 2-4 Moynalvey, 25/6/1989,
- Walterstown - Bye

Round 4

- Seneschalstown 1-10, 1-3 Walterstown, Pairc Tailteann, 9/7/1989,
- St. Colmcille's w/o, scr Moynalvey, Skryne, 9/7/1989,
- Navan O'Mahonys - Bye,

Round 5

- Walterstown 1-7, 0-8 Navan O'Mahonys, Kells, 26/7/1989,
- Seneschalstown 1-16, 0-7 St. Colmcille's, Donore, 26/7/1989,
- Moynalvey - Bye

Quarter-final Playoffs:

- Walterstown 0-12, 0-6 Seneschalstown, Pairc Tailteann, 20/8/1989,
- Navan O'Mahonys 0-13, 2-6 Seneschalstown, ???, 23/8/1989,

== Knock-out Stages ==
The teams in the quarter-finals are the second placed teams from each group and the Group A winner. The teams in the semi-finals are Group B and C winners along with the quarter-final winners.

Quarter-Finals
Skryne	0-10
Summerhill	0-8
Trim	0-8
Navan O'Mahonys	0-10

Semi-Finals
Walterstown	0-7
Skryne	2-5
Nobber	0-4
Navan O'Mahonys	0-12

Final
Navan O'Mahonys	0-17
Skryne	3-6

Quarter-finals:

- Skryne 0-10, 0-8 Summerhill, Trim, 27/8/1989,
- Navan O'Mahonys 0-10, 0-8 Trim, Kells, 27/8/1989,

Semi-finals:

- Navan O'Mahonys 0-12, 0-4 Nobber, Kells, 10/9/1989,
- Skryne 2-5, 0-7 Walterstown, Pairc Tailteann, 10/9/1989,

Final:

- Navan O'Mahonys 0-17, 3-6 Skryne, Pairc Tailteann, 1/10/1989,

== Leinster Senior Club Football Championship ==
Quarter-final:

- Navan O'Mahonys 1-9, 1-8 Johnstownbridge, St. Conleth's Park, 28/10/1989,

Semi-final:

- Thomas Davis 0-15, 0-9 Navan O'Mahonys, Drogheda Park, 12/11/1989,
