= Stephen Bray (Gaelic footballer) =

Irish Gaelic footballer (born 1982)

Personal information
- Native name: Stiofán Ó Bré (Irish)
- Nickname: Brayer
- Born: 23 August 1982 (age 44) Navan, County Meath

Sport
- Sport: Gaelic Football
- Position: Full Forward
Club
- Years: Club
- Navan O'Mahonys
Club titles
- Meath titles: 5
Inter-county
Years	County	Apps (scores)
2005–2015	Meath	46 (10–77)
Inter-county titles
- Leinster titles: 1
- All Stars: 1

Stephen Bray (born 23 August 1982) is a former Gaelic footballer who played for the Navan O'Mahony's club and the Meath county team. A two-footed corner forward, he is a prolific scorer. Bray had a very successful season with Meath in 2007, with a semi final appearance against Cork, and an all star award. However, 2008 was what Bray himself described as a "disaster" for the team. Before joining the Meath senior team, he won Leinster Junior Football Championship and All-Ireland Junior Football Championship medals in 2003.

== Honours ==
- Leinster Senior Football Championship (1): 2010
- Meath Senior Football Championship (4): 2008, 2012, 2014, 2015
- All-Star (1): 2007
- All-Ireland Junior Football Championship (1): 2003
- Leinster Junior Football Championship (1): 2003
- National Football League (1): Division 2 2007

Preceded by Anthony Moyles	Meath Senior Football Captain; 2008-2009	Succeeded by Nigel Crawford
