= 1988 Meath Senior Football Championship =

Meath S.F.C.
- Season: 1988
- Champions: Navan O'Mahonys; 13th Senior Championship Title
- Relegated: St. Patrick's
- Leinster SCFC: Navan O'Mahonys (Semi-Final) Parnells 3-6, Navan O'Mahonys 1-10.
- All Ireland SCFC: n/a
- Winning Captain: Donal Smyth (Navan O'Mahonys)
- Man of the Match: Finian Murtagh (Navan O'Mahonys)
- Matches: 30

The 1988 Meath Senior Football Championship is the 96th edition of the Meath GAA's premier club Gaelic football tournament for senior graded teams in County Meath, Ireland. The tournament consists of 13 teams, with the winner going on to represent Meath in the Leinster Senior Club Football Championship. The championship starts with a group stage and then progresses to a knock out stage.

Navan O'Mahonys were the defending champions after they defeated Skryne in the previous years final, and they successfully defended their title to claim their 13th S.F.C. title when beating Walterstown 0–11 to 0–10 in the final at Pairc Tailteann on 13 November 1988. Donal Smyth raised the Keegan Cup for O'Mahonys while Finian Murtagh claimed his second 'Man of the Match' award, last claiming it in the 1981 S.F.C. Final.

O'Mahonys also were chosen to take part in the Leinster S.C.F.C. campaign as they were the reigning Meath champions, even though the '88 S.F.C. hadn't been completed by the date of their Leinster club match with Johnstownbridge.

Oldcastle were promoted to the S.F.C. after claiming the 1987 Meath Intermediate Football Championship title.

== Team changes ==
The following teams have changed division since the 1987 championship season.

=== To S.F.C. ===
Promoted from I.F.C.

- Oldcastle - (Intermediate Champions)

=== From S.F.C. ===
Regraded to I.F.C.

- Syddan
- Martry Harps

== Group stage ==
=== Group A ===
Team	Pld	W	L	D	PF	PA	PD	Pts
Gaeil Colmcille	3	2	0	1	16*	14*	+2*	5
Oldcastle	3	2	0	1	32	25	+7	5
Trim	3	1	2	0	23*	19*	+4*	2
Slane	3	0	3	0	20	33	-13	0

Round 1

- Oldcastle 1–6, 1-6 Gaeil Colmcille, Ballinlough, 24/4/1988,
- Trim 1-13, 0-6 Slane, Kells, 24/4/1988,

Round 2

- Oldcastle 2-7, 0-7 Trim, Kells, 12/6/1988,
- Gaeil Colmcille 0-7, 0-5 Slane, Walterstown, 17/6/1988,

Round 3

- Oldcastle 1-7, 1-6 Slane, Kells, 10/7/1988,
- Gaeil Colmcille w, l Trim, Dunderry, 10/7/1988,

=== Group B ===
Team	Pld	W	L	D	PF	PA	PD	Pts
Navan O'Mahonys	3	3	0	0	43	29	+14	6
Walterstown	3	1	2	0	35	38	-3	2
Skryne	3	1	2	0	32	35	-3	2
Seneschalstown	3	1	2	0	27	35	-8	2

Round 1

- Navan O'Mahonys 0-11, 1-7 Skryne, Seneschalstown, 24/4/1988,
- Seneschalstown 2-4, 1-6 Walterstown, Kilberry, 24/4/1988,

Round 2

- Navan O'Mahonys 0-11, 0-10 Seneschalstown, Skryne, 12/6/1988,
- Walterstown 2-11, 0-7 Skryne, Dunshaughlin, 17/6/1988,

Round 3

- Navan O'Mahonys 2-15, 0-9 Walterstown, Kells, 10/7/1988,
- Skryne 2-9, 0-7 Seneschalstown, Stamullen, 10/7/1988,

Quarter-final Playoffs:

- Walterstown 2–8, 1-11 Seneschalstown, ???, 24/8/1988,
- Walterstown 2-10, 2-7 Seneschalstown, Kells, 25/9/1988,
- Walterstown 0-12, 0-5 Skryne, Dunshaughlin, 16/10/1988,

=== Group C ===
Team	Pld	W	L	D	PF	PA	PD	Pts
Summerhill	4	4	0	0	66	31	+35	8
Nobber	4	2	1	1	47	37	+10	5
Castletown	4	2	2	0	34*	40*	-6*	4
St. Patrick's	4	1	3	0	24*	51*	-27*	2
Moynalvey	4	0	3	1	32	44	-12	1

Round 1

- Summerhill 0-13, 1-6 Castletown, Skryne, 24/4/1988,
- St. Patrick's 1-8, 0-4 Moynalvey, Dunshaughlin, 24/4/1988,
- Nobber - Bye,

Round 2

- Nobber 1-12, 0-8 St. Patrick's, Seneschalstown, 9/6/1988,
- Castletown 3-6, 2-6 Moynalvey, Dunderry, 18/6/1988,
- Summerhill - Bye,

Round 3

- Summerhill 1-7, 1-5 Moynalvey, Trim, 9/7/1988,
- Nobber 0-15, 1-7 Castletown, Kilmainhamwood, 9/7/1988,
- St. Patrick's - Bye,

Round 4

- Summerhill 5-17, 1-2 St. Patrick's, Pairc Tailteann, 9/8/1988,
- Nobber 1–5, 0-8 Moynalvey, Trim, 26/8/1988,
- Castletown - Bye,

Round 5

- Summerhill 1-8, 1-6 Nobber, Pairc Tailteann, 16/10/1988,
- Castletown w, l St. Patrick's,
- Moynalvey - Bye,

== Knock-out Stages ==
The teams in the quarter-finals are the second placed teams from each group and the Group A winner. The teams in the semi-finals are Group B and C winners along with the quarter-final winners.

Quarter-Finals
Gaeil Colmcille	1-8
Nobber	0-5
Oldcastle	1-3
Walterstown	0-11

Semi-Finals
Gaeil Colmcille	0-8
Navan O'Mahonys	1-8
Summerhill	1-6
Walterstown	1-7

Final
Navan O'Mahonys	0-11
Walterstown	0-10

Quarter-finals:

- Gaeil Colmcille 1-8, 0-5 Nobber, Pairc Tailteann, 23/10/1988,
- Walterstown 0-11, 1-3 Oldcastle, Pairc Tailteann, 23/10/1988,

Semi-finals:

- Navan O'Mahonys 1–8, 0-8 Gaeil Colmcille, Walterstown, 30/10/1988,
- Walterstown 1-7, 1-6 Summerhill, Pairc Tailteann, 30/10/1988,

Final:

- Navan O'Mahonys 0-11, 0-10 Walterstown, Pairc Tailteann, 13/11/1988,

== Leinster Senior Club Football Championship ==
Quarter-final:

- Johnstownbridge 1–7, 1-7 Navan O'Mahonys, St. Conleth's Park, 29/10/1988,
- Navan O'Mahonys 0-10, 0-5 Johnstownbridge, Pairc Tailteann, 24/10/1988,

Semi-final:

- Parnells 0–6, 0-6 Navan O'Mahonys, O'Moore Park, 19/11/1988,
- Parnells 3-6, 1-10 Navan O'Mahonys, Drogheda Park, 26/11/1988,
