= Martry =

Areas in County Meath, Ireland

Martry (Irish: Martra) is the name of a townland, an electoral district, and a civil parish in County Meath, Ireland.
