= Gibstown =

Gibbstown or Gibstown or Gibbston may refer to several places:

== Ireland ==
- Gibstown, County Louth, a townland; see List of townlands of County Louth
- Baile Ghib, County Meath, a village
  - Gibstown, County Meath, a townland; see List of townlands of County Meath
- Gibstown, County Westmeath, a townland; see List of townlands of County Westmeath
- Gibstown, County Wicklow, a townland; see List of townlands of County Wicklow

== New Zealand ==
- Collingwood, New Zealand, a town on Golden Bay / Mohua, South Island, originally named Gibbstown
- Gibbston, Otago, New Zealand, a community and wine region

== Elsewhere ==
- Gibbstown, New Jersey, United States, an unincorporated community
