= 1985 Meath Senior Football Championship =

Meath S.F.C.
- Season: 1985
- Champions: Navan O'Mahonys; 11th Senior Championship Title
- Relegated: Kilmainhamwood
- Leinster SCFC: ???
- All Ireland SCFC: n/a
- Winning Captain: Damien Sheridan (Navan O'Mahonys)
- Man of the Match: Joe Cassells (Navan O'Mahonys)
- Matches: 31

The 1985 Meath Senior Football Championship is the 93rd edition of the Meath GAA's premier club Gaelic football tournament for senior graded teams in County Meath, Ireland. The tournament consists of 14 teams, with the winner going on to represent Meath in the Leinster Senior Club Football Championship. The championship starts with a group stage and then progresses to a knock out stage.

Walterstown were the defending champions once again after they defeated Skryne in the previous years final to claim the "3-in-a-Row", but Skryne claimed their revenge when ending the Black's winning streak at the semi-final stage.

Slane returned to the senior grade after claiming the 1984 Meath Intermediate Football Championship title.

Navan O'Mahonys claimed their 11th S.F.C. title when defeating Skryne 0–10 to 0–7 in the final on 29 September 1985. Damien Sheridan raised the Keegan Cup for O'Mahonys while Joe Cassells claimed the 'Man of the Match' award.

Kilmainhamwood were regraded to the I.F.C. for 1986 after just 3 years in the grade.

== Team changes ==
The following teams have changed division since the 1984 championship season.

=== To S.F.C. ===
Promoted from I.F.C.

- Slane - (Intermediate Champions)

=== From S.F.C. ===
Regraded to I.F.C.

- Gaeil Colmcille
- Martinstown/Athboy

== Group stage ==
=== Group A ===
Team	Pld	W	L	D	PF	PA	PD	Pts
Walterstown	4	4	0	0	41*	21*	+20*	8
Seneschalstown	4	2	1	1	35	38	-3	5
Nobber	4	1	1	2	35	37	-2	4
Slane	4	1	2	1	27*	32*	-5*	3
Trim	4	0	4	0	13**	23**	-10**	0

Round 1

- Walterstown 0-11, 1-4 Slane, 14/4/1985,
- Nobber 1-8, 0-9 Trim, 14/4/1985,
- Seneschalstown - Bye,

Round 2

- Walterstown 4-7, 0-7 Seneschalstown, 28/4/1985,
- Nobber 2–5, 1-8 Slane, 28/4/1985,
- Trim - Bye,

Round 3

- Nobber 0–6, 0-6 Seneschalstown, 5/5/1985,
- Slane w, l Trim,
- Walterstown - Bye,

Round 4

- Seneschalstown 1-7, 1-6 Slane, 9/6/1985,
- Walterstown w, l Trim,
- Nobber - Bye,

Round 5

- Walterstown 2-5, 0-7 Nobber, 7/7/1985,
- Seneschalstown 1-9, 0-4 Trim, 21/7/1985,
- Slane - Bye,

=== Group B ===
Team	Pld	W	L	D	PF	PA	PD	Pts
Navan O'Mahonys	4	4	0	0	52	33	+19	8
Summerhill	4	3	1	0	54	25	+29	6
Moynalvey	4	2	2	0	26*	30*	-4	4
St. Patrick's	4	1	3	0	33	48	-15	2
Ballivor	4	0	4	0	11*	40*	-29*	0

Round 1

- Navan O'Mahonys 3-6, 1-7 Moynalvey, 14/4/1985,
- St. Patrick's 1-8, 0-5 Ballivor, 14/4/1985,
- Summerhill - Bye,

Round 2

- Navan O'Mahonys 2-7, 1-7 Summerhill, 28/4/1985,
- Moynalvey w, l Ballivor,
- St. Patrick's - Bye,

Round 3

- Summerhill 2-13, 0-2 Ballivor, 5/5/1985,
- Moynalvey 1-8, 0-8 St. Patrick's, 5/5/1985,
- Navan O'Mahonys - Bye,

Round 4

- Summerhill 0-7, 0-5 Moynalvey, 16/6/1985,
- Navan O'Mahonys 1-11, 0-9 St. Patrick's, 16/6/1985,
- Ballivor - Bye,

Round 5

- Summerhill 3-9, 0-5 St. Patrick's, 7/7/1985,
- Navan O'Mahonys 0-10, 1-1 Ballivor, 14/7/1985,
- Moynalvey - Bye,

=== Group C ===
Team	Pld	W	L	D	PF	PA	PD	Pts
Skryne	3	3	0	0	61	11	+50	6
Castletown	3	2	1	0	26	28	-2	4
Syddan	3	0	0	0	16	24	-8	2
Kilmainahmwood	3	0	3	0	9	39	-30	0

Round 1

- Skryne 2-9, 0-8 Syddan, 14/4/1985,
- Castletown 0-7, 0-6 Kilmainhamwood, 14/4/1985,

Round 2

- Skryne 6-14, 1-0 Kilmainhamwood, 28/4/1985,
- Castletown 1-6, 1-5 Syddan, 28/4/1985,

Round 3

- Skryne 1-11, 1-7 Castletown, 9/6/1985,
- Syddan w/o, scr Kilmainhamwood,

== Knock-out Stages ==
The teams in the quarter-finals are the second placed teams from each group and the Group C winner. The teams in the semi-finals are Group A and B winners along with the quarter-final winners.

Quarter-Finals
Seneschalstown	0-9
Castletown	2-5
Skryne	0-11
Summerhill	0-3

Semi-Finals
Navan O'Mahonys	4-6
Castletown	2-3
Skryne	1-12
Walterstown	1-4

Final
Navan O'Mahonys	0-10
Skryne	0-7

Quarter-finals:

- Castletown 2-5, 0-9 Seneschalstown, Pairc Tailteann, 25/8/1985,
- Skryne 0-11, 0-3 Summerhill, Pairc Tailteann, 25/8/1985,

Semi-finals:

- Navan O'Mahonys 4-6, 2-3 Castletown, Pairc Tailteann, 8/9/1985,
- Skryne 1-12, 1-4 Walterstown, Pairc Tailteann, 8/9/1985,

Final:

- Navan O'Mahonys 0-10, 0-7 Skryne, Pairc Tailteann, 29/9/1985,
