= 1987 Meath Senior Football Championship =

Meath S.F.C.
- Season: 1987
- Champions: Navan O'Mahonys; 12th Senior Championship Title
- Relegated: Martry Harps; Syddan
- Leinster SCFC: Summerhill (Preliminary Round Replay) Portlaoise 1-15, Summerhill 1-4.
- All Ireland SCFC: n/a
- Winning Captain: Brian Smyth (Navan O'Mahonys)
- Man of the Match: Brian Reilly (Navan O'Mahonys)
- Matches: 45

The 1987 Meath Senior Football Championship is the 95th edition of the Meath GAA's premier club Gaelic football tournament for senior graded teams in County Meath, Ireland. The tournament consists of 14 teams, with the winner going on to represent Meath in the Leinster Senior Club Football Championship. The championship starts with a group stage and then progresses to a knock out stage.

Summerhill were the defending champions after they defeated Seneschalstown in the previous years final, however in this year's campaign they failed to progress past the group phase. They were chosen to represent Meath in the 1987 Leinster Senior Club Football Championship as the Meath SFC was still ongoing by the first round of the Leinster Club SFC at the beginning of October, due to Meath's All-Ireland success.

Gaeil Colmcille returned to the senior grade after a three-year absence when claiming the 1986 Meath Intermediate Football Championship title.

Navan O'Mahonys claimed their 12th S.F.C. title when defeating Skryne 0–13 to 1–9 in the final at Kells on 1 October 1987. Brian Smyth raised the Keegan Cup for O'Mahonys while his brother Brian Reilly claimed the 'Man of the Match' award.

Martry Harps were regraded to the I.F.C. for 1988 after just two years in the S.F.C. failing to win a match. Syddan's superb 46-year run in the Senior grade also ended with relegation this year.

== Team changes ==
The following teams have changed division since the 1986 championship season.

=== To S.F.C. ===
Promoted from I.F.C.

- Gaeil Colmcille - (Intermediate Champions)

=== From S.F.C. ===
Regraded to I.F.C.

- Ballivor

== Group stage ==
=== Group A ===
| Team | Pld | W | L | D | PF | PA | PD | Pts |
|---|---|---|---|---|---|---|---|---|
| Navan O'Mahonys | 4 | 4 | 0 | 0 | 72 | 28 | +44 | 8 |
| Seneschalstown | 4 | 3 | 1 | 0 | 47 | 35 | +12 | 6 |
| Nobber | 4 | 2 | 2 | 0 | 38 | 36 | +2 | 4 |
| Gaeil Colmcille | 4 | 1 | 3 | 0 | 13 | 35 | -22 | 2 |
| Syddan | 4 | 0 | 4 | 0 | 21 | 57 | -36 | 0 |

Round 1

- Navan O'Mahonys 5-12, 1-6 Syddan, Rathkenny, 5/5/1987,
- Seneschalstown 1-9, 0-4 Gaeil Colmcille, 12/5/1987,
- Nobber - Bye,

Round 2

- Nobber 2-6, 1-3 Syddan, Castletown, 17/5/1987,
- Navan O'Mahonys 1-10, 0-5 Gaeil Colmcille, Walterstown, 24/5/1987,
- Seneschalstown - Bye,

Round 3

- Navan O'Mahonys 2-12, 0-5 Seneschalstown, ???, 31/5/1987,
- Nobber 1-7, 0-4 Gaeil Colmcille, ???, 7/6/1987,
- Syddan - Bye,

Round 4

- Navan O'Mahonys 0-14, 1-6 Nobber, Seneschalstown, 5/7/1987,
- Seneschalstown 4-6, 1-3 Syddan, Rathkenny, 5/7/1983,
- Gaeil Colmcille - Bye,

Round 5

- Seneschalstown 2-6, 0-7 Nobber, Syddan, 10/7/1986,
- Gaeil Colmcille w/o, scr Syddan,
- Navan O'Mahonys - Bye,

=== Group B ===
| Team | Pld | W | L | D | PF | PA | PD | Pts |
|---|---|---|---|---|---|---|---|---|
| Skryne | 4 | 3 | 1 | 0 | 59 | 35 | +24 | 6 |
| Moynalvey | 4 | 3 | 1 | 0 | 54 | 46 | +8 | 6 |
| Summerhill | 4 | 2 | 1 | 1 | 51 | 43 | +8 | 5 |
| Castletown | 4 | 1 | 2 | 1 | 31 | 48 | -17 | 3 |
| Trim | 4 | 0 | 4 | 0 | 23 | 46 | -23 | 0 |

Round 1

- Skryne 1-11, 0-9 Summerhill, Dunshaughlin, 6/5/1987,
- Moynalvey 3-9, 1-9 Trim, Kilmessan, 6/5/1987,
- Castletown - Bye,

Round 2

- Skryne 2-11, 0-4 Castletown, Seneschalstown, 17/5/1987,
- Summerhill 1-8, 0-9 Moynalvey, ???, 31/5/1987,
- Trim - Bye,

Round 3

- Summerhill 1-12, 0-4 Trim, ???, 7/6/1987,
- Moynalvey 3-6, 2-5 Castletown, ???, 7/6/1987,
- Skryne - Bye,

Round 4

- Summerhill 2–10, 2-10 Castletown, Walterstown, 5/7/1987,
- Skryne 3-7, 1-4 Trim, Dunshaughlin, 5/7/1987,
- Moynalvey - Bye,

Round 5

- Moynalvey 3-6, 1-9 Skryne, Summerhill, 10/7/1987
- Castletown w/o, scr Trim,
- Summerhill - Bye,

Semi-final Playoff:

- Skryne 2-6, 1-5 Moynalvey, Dunshaughlin, 31/7/1987,

=== Group C ===
| Team | Pld | W | L | D | PF | PA | PD | Pts |
|---|---|---|---|---|---|---|---|---|
| Slane | 3 | 3 | 0 | 0 | 24 | 16 | +8 | 6 |
| Walterstown | 3 | 2 | 1 | 0 | 43 | 24 | +19 | 4 |
| St. Patrick's | 3 | 1 | 2 | 0 | 30 | 30 | +0 | 4 |
| Martry Harps | 3 | 0 | 3 | 0 | 15 | 36 | -21 | 0 |

Round 1

- Walterstown 3-15, 1-1 Martry Harps, Seneschalstown, 3/5/1987,
- Slane 2-8, 0-8 St. Patrick's, Bellewstown, 6/5/1987,

Round 2

- Slane 0-10, 1-5 Walterstown, Rathkenny, 17/5/1987,
- St. Patrick's 1-9, 2-5 Martry Harps, Duleek, 17/5/1987,

Round 3

- Walterstown 0-11, 0-10 St. Patrick's, Duleek, 5/7/1987,
- Slane w/o, scr Martry Harps,

== Knock-out Stages ==
The teams in the quarter-finals are the second placed teams from each group and the Group C winner. The teams in the semi-finals are Group A and B winners along with the quarter-final winners.

Quarter-Finals
Slane | 2-14
Moynalvey | 1-3
Seneschalstown | 0-7
Walterstown | 0-11

Semi-Finals
Navan O'Mahonys | 1-14
Slane | 0-6
Skryne | 1-12
Walterstown | 1-5

Final
Navan O'Mahonys | 0-13
Skryne | 1-9

Quarter-finals:

- Walterstown 0-11, 1-7 Seneschalstown, 31/7/1987,
- Slane 2-14, 1-3 Moynalvey, Dunshaughlin, 30/8/1987,

Semi-finals:

- Navan O'Mahonys 0–6, 0-6 Slane, Kells, 27/9/1987,
- Skryne 1-12, 1-5 Walterstown, Kells, 27/9/1987,

Semi-final Replay:

- Navan O'Mahonys 1-14, 0-6 Slane, Seneschalstown, 4/10/1987,

Final:

- Navan O'Mahonys 0-13, 1-9 Skryne, Kells, 11/10/1987,

== Leinster Senior Club Football Championship ==
Preliminary round:

- Portlaoise 0–12, 0-12 Summerhill, Summerhill, 10/10/1987,
- Portlaoise 1-15, 1-4 Summerhill, O'Moore Park, 24/10/1987,
