= Carlanstown =

Carlanstown Droichead Chearbhalláin
- Village
- Location in Ireland
- Coordinates: 53°45′34″N 6°50′27″W
- Country: Ireland
- Province: Leinster
- County: County Meath

Population (2016)
  - Total: 664
- Time zone: UTC+0 (WET)
  - Summer (DST): UTC-1 (IST (WEST))

Carlanstown (Irish: Droichead Chearbhalláin) is a village and townland in County Meath, Ireland. As of the 2016 census, there were 664 people living in the village.

Carlanstown is located approximately 4 km northeast of the larger town of Kells, County Meath on the N52 road. From October 2022 Bus Éireann extended its Dundalk to Ardee service, route 167, to serve the village and continue to Mullingar via Kells. There are several daily services each way.

The Moynalty River, which flows to the south of the village, is spanned by Carlanstown Bridge which dates to c.1800. The local national (primary) school, Scoil Mhuire Carlanstown, was built in the mid-1940s.
