= Navan O'Mahonys GAA =

Gaelic games club in County Meath, Ireland

Navan O'Mahony's GAA
- CLCG Ó Mathúna An Uaimh
- Founded: 1948
- County: Meath
- Grounds: Paddy O’Brien Park, Navan
- Coordinates: 53°39′00″N 6°41′28″W

Playing kits
Standard colours

Senior Club Championships
	All Ireland	Leinster champions	Meath champions
Football:	0	0	20
Hurling:	0	0	2

Navan O'Mahony's (Irish: CLCG Ó Mathúna An Uaimh) is a Gaelic Athletic Association (GAA) club located in Navan, County Meath, Ireland. The club fields teams in Gaelic football, hurling, and camogie. Navan O'Mahony's participates in various Meath GAA Senior Football Championship competitions having won the title 20 times, making it the most successful football club in Meath. Additionally, the club has claimed the Meath Senior Hurling Championship title twice, placing it among the top teams in the county.

== History ==
The idea of forming a new Gaelic football club in Navan was first mooted during a late evening discussion at the house of the late Peter Hughes, Artherton, Navan, with co-founders, the late Eddie Duignan and Jack Callaghan spearheading the move. An impromptu meeting was called for the purpose of forming the new club but just nine men turned up for this meeting. They were Peter Hughes, Jack Callaghan, Eddie Duignan, Paddy Cahill, Benny Garland, Tom Duignan, Patsy Reilly, Terry O'Dea and Jackie Carroll.

=== Inaugural meeting on 28 October 1948 ===
The men called a second meeting for 28 October 1948. The venue was the local A.O.H. hall in Watergate Street, Navan. There was a small attendance at this meeting but those present showed a desire to form a new Gaelic Football Club. The first officers elected at that meeting were: President James O'Rourke, Chairman Terry O'Dea, Vice Chairman Jack Callaghan, Secretary Jackie Carroll, and Treasurer Thomas Deery.

=== Name of the club ===
The club was named "Navan O'Mahony's" after the original Navan Pierce Mahony's club, which was formed in September 1887. The name was inspired by Pierce Charles de Lacy O'Mahony (1850–1930), a Member of Parliament for North Meath, a Parnellite, and an advocate for home rule.

The Pierce O'Mahony's won the 1894 and 1895 Meath Senior Football Championship. In 1895, they represented Meath in the All-Ireland Final against Arravale Rovers GAA from Tipperary but lost under controversial circumstances. This final was the first played in what is now known as Croke Park. The initial game ended in a draw, and in the replay, the referee declared Arravale the winner. However, he later admitted in a letter to the press that he had recorded the score incorrectly, and Pierce Mahony's should have been declared the winner. The press agreed, but the G.A.A. did not change the official result. As a compromise, a special set of medals was presented to Meath as virtual winners of the championship.

Due to what they considered unfair treatment, the club disbanded in 1897. It took fifty-one years before the name O'Mahony reappeared among the clubs of Meath.

=== First team ===
The committee began to field their first team with the limited number of players available. The club colors were blue and white, initially a blue jersey with a white collar and cuffs. Later, (^{When?)} hooped blue and white jerseys were introduced. Club finances were low, so bicycles were used for transport to local games. Fullback Eric Doyle owned a lorry, which was used to transport players to away games. At the time, dressing facilities or showers were not available, so players changed clothes along the nearest ditch to the playing area. Funds were raised through concerts, card games, and membership contributions of 2/6d.

The team won the Meath Junior Football Championship in 1949 on their first attempt. The club moved up to senior level in 1950 but had little immediate success in that grade. They won the Feis Cup in 1951, defeating Skryne in the final at Páirc Tailteann. The Feis Cup final was part of Feis na Mi, which included Irish dancing, singing, storytelling, and Irish music, organized by the Gaelic League. Peter McDermott, known as the "man in the cap," moved to Navan and joined O'Mahoney's, contributing to that victory.

=== First Keegan Cup winners ===
O'Mahoney's were the first winners of the Keegan Cup in 1953, defeating Trim 3–7 to 2–4, with Tony McCormack accepting the cup for the first time. They won the 1956 Meath Intermediate Football Championship against Dunshaughlin and after a lapse of four years, they regained the Keegan Cup in 1957 and went on to win five times in a row from 1957 to 1961. They would go on to win the championship again in 2014 and 2015.

=== Twenty Senior Football titles ===
Since its establishment in 1948, the club heads the roll of honor in Meath with 20 senior football championship titles.

=== Hurling ===
The club also has a hurling tradition and has won titles at all levels in underage competitions, completing seven in a row under 21 hurling titles in 2003 as well as back-to-back minor hurling titles in 1999/2000. They reached the final of the Meath Junior Hurling Championship in 1956 but were defeated by Boardsmill.

In 1961 they won the Intermediate Hurling Championship final against Salesian College, Warrenstown by 5–8 to 4-4. Intermediate successes were also recorded in 1970, 1979, 1993, and 1997 with senior success in 1985/86.

=== Camogie and Ladies' Football ===
The club also organizes camogie and ladies' football. In the club's Golden Jubilee Year (1998) it was awarded the Camogie Club of the Year award and Young Camogie Player of the Year. The club has girls' teams all the way up to senior.

On 8 September 2013, the intermediate team defeated Summerhill in the intermediate championship in Ashbourne, O'Mahonys 3–5 to Summerhill 1–7. The team was captained by Aedin Murray.

=== Nursery for O'Mahonys ===
The Navan De La Salle Juvenile Hurling and Football Club, originally based at the old De La Salle Brothers School, served as a feeder club for Navan O'Mahonys. Most of their players moved to O'Mahonys when they reached minor age, which contributed to the club's subsequent successes. The old De La Salle School, which was initially a military barracks, has since been demolished. However, the residence attached to the old school still exists, located off the Navan ring road and opposite the Navan Fire Station.

The De La Salle club did not have its own grounds, so all training took place in the old jumping enclosure beside Páirc Tailteann, which is now the O'Mahony's grounds. With the decline in vocations, the De La Salle Brothers left Navan, leading to an agreement to amalgamate the De La Salle and O'Mahony clubs.

The amalgamation occurred in 1989 with the club winning a record number of titles in the following years.

=== Contribution at inter-county level ===
The development of O'Mahonys as a prominent club in hurling and football coincided with the rise of Meath's impact at the inter-county level. Meath's first All-Ireland winning team included Peter McDermott, who also captained Meath to victory in the 1954 All-Ireland Final. He is now one of the club's Honorary Presidents.

The club has been represented by players such as Joe Cassells, David Beggy, Finian Murtagh, Donal Smyth, Patsy Ratty, Willie McGuirk, John Brady, and Séamus Clynch. In more recent times, players like Niall and Shane McKeigue, Stephen and David Bray, Stephen McGabhann, Mark Ward, Kevin Reilly, Gary O’Brien, and Cormac McGuinness have represented the club.

O'Mahonys hurlers who have represented Meath at the inter-county level include Ben Tansey, Gerry Kelly, Pádraic Coone, Niall and Shane McKeigue, Trevor Donoghue, and Seamus Duignan.

=== Club development ===
The club draws its membership from the greater Navan area. The St.Patrick's Classical School, in its All-Ireland Senior Football Colleges triumphs of 2000 and 2001, had a starting lineup containing nine O'Mahony's players with another five in the support panel.

=== Club grounds ===
The O'Mahony's were formerly owned by the Royal Meath Agricultural Society grounds on which the clubhouse is situated at Brews Hill. They were later acquired by the Meath County Board and subsequently purchased by O'Mahony's. Many local people still refer to these grounds as the "Jumping Enclosure" as they were used by the Agricultural Society for shows which included horse jumping and pony racing. The indoor show events took place in the "Pavilion" which occupied the site where the O'Mahony's clubhouse now stands.

The grounds are in constant use by the club teams in hurling, football, camogie, and ladies' football as well as by the local schools. Floodlights were installed in 2003 to facilitate the playing of hurling and football matches during the winter evenings. The pitch has also been redeveloped and lights installed at the lower training pitch.

An extra two state-of-the-art pitches are being developed. The new grounds also include a new clubhouse with dressing rooms. The existing grounds on Brews Hill in Navan was named Paddy O'Brien Park in the summer of 2015, in honor of Paddy O'Brien, a prominent figure in O'Mahony's who died in 2010.

== Honours ==
- Meath Senior Football Championships: 19
  - 1953, 1957, 1958, 1959, 1960, 1961, 1963, 1973, 1979, 1981, 1985, 1987, 1988, 1989, 1990, 1997, 2008, 2012, 2014, 2015.
- Meath Senior Hurling Championships: 2
  - 1985, 1986
- Meath Intermediate Football Championship: 2
  - 1956, 2003
- Meath Intermediate Hurling Championship: 8
  - 1961, 1970, 1979, 1985, 1993, 1997, 2017, 2024
- Meath Junior Football Championship: 2
  - 1949, 1974
- Meath Junior Hurling Championship 3
  - 1999, 2003, 2017

== Notable players ==
A number of players from Navan O'Mahonys have represented Meath at the inter-county level in both hurling and football, including:

- Peter McDermott (captained the 1954 Meath All-Ireland winning team)
- Joe Cassells
- Stephen Bray
- Kevin Reilly
- Cormac McGuinness
- Mark Ward

Preceded by Seneschalstown	Meath Senior Football Champions; 2008	Succeeded by Seneschalstown
Preceded by Summerhill	Meath Senior Football Champions; 2012	Succeeded by incumbent

Preceded by Navan O'Mahonys	Meath Senior Hurling Champions; 1986	Succeeded by Trim
