= Mattie Kerrigan =

Irish Gaelic footballer and manager

Personal information
- Native name: Maitiú Ó Ciaragáin (Irish)
- Nickname: MK
- Born: 1943 (age 82–83) Summerhill, County Meath, Ireland
- Height: 6 ft 2 in (188 cm)

Sport
- Sport: Gaelic football
- Position: Right corner-forward
Club
- Years: Club
- Summerhill
Club titles
- Meath titles: 4
- Leinster titles: 1
Inter-county
- Years: County
- 1966–1977: Meath
Inter-county titles
- Leinster titles: 2
- All-Irelands: 1
- NFL: 1
- All Stars: 1

Matthew Kerrigan (born 1943) is an Irish former Gaelic footballer and manager who played for the Summerhill club and at senior level for the Meath county team. He later had several successes as an inter-county manager.

== Playing career ==
Kerrigan had an unconventional beginning to his inter-county career after failing to earn a call-up to the Meath minor football team. He later missed out in the under-21 grade as Meath didn't enter the Leinster Under-21 Championship at the time. Kerrigan first appeared for Meath as a member of the junior team that lost the 1964 All-Ireland home final, before making his senior debut against Louth during the 1966-67 National League. His debut season ended with a victory over Cork in the 1967 All-Ireland final. Kerrigan made a second All-Ireland final appearance in 1970, losing out to Kerry on that occasion, before claiming a National League title in 1975 and ending the season by being selected on the All-Star team. He also enjoyed success on the club scene as part of the Summerhill four-in-a-row team from 1974 to 1977. Kerrigan ended his career by winning a Leinster Club Championship title.

== Managerial career ==
In retirement from playing, Kerrigan's management career included roles with various Meath teams in all grades, including the senior team, and he guided the minors and under 21s to a number of Leinster titles. Kerrigan also had spells in charge of Westmeath and Cavan.

He managed Westmeath for nearly four years, between 1992 and 1995.

== Media career ==
He has worked as an analyst for LMFM.

== Honours ==
=== Player ===
Summerhill

- Leinster Senior Club Football Championship: 1977
- Meath Senior Football Championship: 1974, 1975, 1976, 1977

Meath

- All-Ireland Senior Football Championship: 1967
- Leinster Senior Football Championship: 1967, 1970
- National Football League: 1974-75
- Leinster Junior Football Championship: 1964

Awards

- All-Star: 1975

=== Manager ===
Meath

- Leinster Minor Football Championship: 1980

Leinster

- Railway Cup: 1996, 1997

Sporting positions
Preceded by	Meath senior football team captain 1975–1976	Succeeded by
Preceded by Mick O'Brien	Meath senior football team coach 1977–1978	Succeeded by Des Ferguson
Preceded by Brian Murtagh	Westmeath senior football team manager 1992–1995	Succeeded by Barney Rock
Preceded by Martin McHugh	Cavan senior football team manager 1997	Succeeded by Liam Austin
Preceded by Val Andrews	Cavan senior football team manager 2001–2003	Succeeded by Eamonn Coleman
