= 1978 Meath Intermediate Football Championship =

Meath I.F.C.
- Season: 1978
- Champions: Duleek; 4th Intermediate Football Championship title
- Relegated: ???

The 1978 Meath Intermediate Football Championship is the 52nd edition of the Meath GAA's premier club Gaelic football tournament for intermediate graded teams in County Meath, Ireland. The tournament consists of 19 teams. The championship starts with a group stage and then progresses to a knock out stage.

This was Wolfe Tone's debut in the Intermediate grade after relegation from the S.F.C. the previous year. The club were formed in 1975 when St. John's (Kilberry) and Gibbstown joined forces. St. John's had previously won the I.F.C. title in 1974 so Wolfe Tones were put straight into the S.F.C.

Ballinabrackey were promoted after claiming the 1977 Meath Junior Football Championship title.

On 27 August 1978, Duleek claimed their 4th Intermediate championship title when they defeated Kilmainhamwood 0-9 to 1-5 in the final.

== Team changes ==
The following teams have changed division since the 1977 championship season.

=== From I.F.C. ===
Promoted to S.F.C.

- Dunshaughlin - (Intermediate Champions)

Relegated to 1978 J.A.F.C.

- St. Mary's Donore

=== To I.F.C. ===
Regraded from S.F.C.

- Wolfe Tones

Promoted from J.A.F.C.

- Ballinabrackey - (Junior 'A' Champions)

== Group stage ==
There are 3 groups called Group A, B and C. The top finishers in Group A and B will qualify for the semi-finals. First place in Group C along with the runners-up in all the groups qualify for the quarter-finals.

=== Group A ===
Team	Pld	W	L	D	PF	PA	PD	Pts
Kilmainhamwood	9	9	0	0	0	0	+0	18
Duleek	9	7	2	0	0	0	+0	14
Nobber	9	7	2	0	0	0	+0	14
Curraha	9	6	3	0	0	0	+0	12
Donaghmore	9	5	4	0	0	0	+0	10
Kilcloon	9	5	4	0	0	0	+0	10
Slane	9	3	6	0	0	0	+0	6
Dunsany	9	2	7	0	0	0	+0	4
Drumbaragh Emmets	9	1	8	0	0	0	+0	2
Ballinlough	9	0	9	0	0	0	+0	0

Round 1:

- Drumbaragh 1-7, 0-5 Ballinlough, Kells, 9/4/1978,
- Donaghmore 1-7, 0-4 Slane, Duleek, 9/4/1978,
- Duleek 3-5, 0-3 Kilcloon, Skryne, 9/4/1978,
- Curraha 3-6, 1-4 Dunsany, ???, 9/4/1978,
- Kilmainhamwood 1-6, 0-5 Nobber, Kilberry, 16/4/1978,

Round 2:

- Duleek 2-11, 1-6 Drumbaragh, Kilberry, 23/4/1978,
- Nobber 0-12, 2-3 Slane, Duleek, 23/4/1978,
- Curraha 1-9, 0-6 Donaghmore, Seneschalstown, 23/4/1978,
- Kilmainhamwood 1-6, 1-3 Dunsany, 23/4/1978,
- Kilcloon 2-12, 2-6 Ballinlough, Kildalkey, 23/4/1978,

Round 3:

- Kilmainhamwood 1-5, 1-4 Donaghmore, Kilberry, 30/4/1978,
- Nobber 2-6, 2-5 Duleek, Seneschalstown, 30/4/1978,
- Slane 0-8, 0-3 Drumbaragh, Castletown, 30/4/1978,
- Dunsany 4-7, 1-5 Ballinlough, Pairc Tailteann, 7/5/1978,
- Kilcloon 1-9, 0-8 Curraha, Donaghmore, 7/5/1978,

Round 4:

- Curraha 0-10, 1-5 Drumbaragh, Kilberry, 14/5/1978,
- Kilmainhamwood 4-6, 1-7 Duleek, Castletown, 14/5/1978,
- Donaghmore 1-15, 1-5 Dunsany, Skryne, 14/5/1978,
- Nobber 3-10, 2-5 Kilcloon, Pairc Tailteann, 14/5/1978,
- Slane 0-10, 2-3 Ballinlough, Gibbstown, 14/5/1978,

Round 5:

- Curraha 2-8, 0-7 Nobber, Seneschalstown, 28/5/1978,
- Duleek 3-10, 0-9 Slane, Skryne, 28/5/1978,
- Kilmainhamwood 3-7, 0-5 Drumbaragh, 28/5/1978,
- Kilcloon 4-4, 0-12 Dunsany, Kilmessan, 28/5/1978,
- Donaghmore w/o, scr Ballinlough,

Round 6:

- Duleek 1-8, 0-5 Donaghmore, pairc Tailteann, 11/6/1978,
- Dunsany w, l Drumbaragh, Kildalkey, 11/6/1978,
- Curraha 2-8, 1-3 Slane, Duleek, 11/6/1978,
- Nobber w/o, scr Ballinlough, Kells, 11/6/1978,
- Kilmainhamwood 1-12, 0-10 Kilcloon, Pairc Tailteann, 25/6/1978,

Round 7:

- Donaghmore 3-17, 3-5 Drumbaragh, Seneschalstown, 25/6/1978,
- Nobber 1-15, 1-1 Dunsany, Kilberry, 25/6/1978,
- Kilmainhamwood 1-8, 1-4 Curraha, Kilberry, 2/7/1978,
- Duleek w/o, scr Ballinlough,
- Kilcloon w, l Slane,

Round 8:

- Kilmainhamwood 4-11, 1-2 Slane, Pairc Tailteann, 8/7/1978,
- Duleek 3-7, 1-6 Dunsany, Kilberry, 9/7/1978,
- Nobber 0-6, 0-2 Donaghmore, Kilmessan, 9/7/1978,
- Curraha w/o, scr Ballinlough,
- Kilcloon w, l Drumbaragh,

Round 9:

- Slane 2-10, 1-11 Dunsany, Skryne, 16/7/1978,
- Donaghmore 4-7, 2-10 Kilcloon, Skryne, 16/7/1978,
- Nobber 2-9, 0-5 Drumbaragh, Kells, 16/7/1978,
- Kilmainhamwood w/o, scr Ballinlough,
- Duleek 0-8, 1-4 Curraha, Pairc Tailteann, 23/7/1978,

Quarter-finals Playoff:

- Duleek 2-5, 1-3 Nobber, Pairc Tailteann, 30/7/1978,

=== Group B ===
Team	Pld	W	L	D	PF	PA	PD	Pts
Wolfe Tones	8	7	1	0	0	0	+0	14
Skryne 'B'	8	5	1	2	0	0	+0	12
Rathkenny	8	4	2	2	0	0	+0	10
Oldcastle	8	4	2	2	0	0	+0	10
Martinstown/Athboy	8	4	3	1	0	0	+0	9
Ballinabrackey	8	4	3	1	0	0	+0	9
Summerhill 'B'	8	2	6	0	0	0	+0	4
Navan O'Mahonys 'B'	8	1	6	1	0	0	+0	3
St. Vincent's	8	0	7	1	0	0	+0	1

Round 1:

- Summerhill 'B' 1-8, 0-8 Navan O'Mahonys 'B', Kilberry, 9/4/1978,
- Rathkenny 1-8, 3-2 Skryne 'B', Seneschalstown, 9/4/1978,
- Oldcastle w/o, scr Martinstown/Athboy, Kilskyre, 11/6/1978,
- St. Vincent's 2-3, 1-6 Ballinabrackey, Trim, 11/6/1978,
- Wolfe Tones - Bye,

Round 2:

- Skryne 'B' 2-9, 3-6 Oldcastle, Pairc Tailteann, 23/4/1978,
- Ballinabrackey 0-8, 0-2 Navan O'Mahonys 'B', Trim, 23/4/1978,
- Wolfe Tones 2-4, 0-4 St. Vincent's, Dunshaughlin, 23/4/1978,
- Martinstown/Athboy 3-4, 2-7 Rathkenny, Kells, 23/4/1978,
- Summerhill 'B' - Bye,

Round 3:

- Summerhill 'B' 1-6, 1-3 St. Vincent's, Skryne, 30/4/1978,
- Rathkenny 1-5, 0-5 Navan O'Mahonys 'B', Kilberry, 7/5/1978,
- Wolfe Tones 1-13, 1-6 Skryne 'B', Seneschalstown, 4/6/1978,
- Martinstown/Athboy 0-10, 0-7 Ballinabrackey, Kildalkey, 25/6/1978,
- Oldcastle - Bye,

Round 4:

- Rathkenny 3-4, 0-6 Summerhill 'B', Trim, 14/5/1978,
- Wolfe Tones 0-10, 1-5 Martinstown/Athboy, Pairc Tailteann, 14/5/1978,
- Ballinabrackey 1-7, 1-6 Oldcastle, Athboy, 14/5/1978,
- Skryne 'B' w, l Navan O'Mahonys 'B', Dunshaughlin, 23/7/1978,
- St. Vincent's - Bye,

Round 5:

- Oldcastle 4-6, 1-5 St. Vincent's, Kilberry, 28/5/1978,
- Wolfe Tones 5-9, 1-7 Navan O'Mahonys 'B', Seneschalstown, 28/5/1978,
- Ballinabrackey 1-11, 2-3 Rathkenny, Trim, 28/5/1978,
- Skryne 'B' 1-9, 0-8 Summerhill 'B', Kilmessan, 26/6/1978,
- Martinstown/Athboy - Bye,

Round 6:

- Rathkenny 6-10, 1-1 St. Vincent's, Seneschalstown, 11/6/1978,
- Wolfe Tones 2-7, 1-3 Ballinabrackey, Trim, 11/6/1978,
- Oldcastle 1-6, 2-3 Navan O'Mahonys 'B', Trim, 25/6/1978,
- Martinstown/Athboy 5-9, 0-5 Summerhill, Kildalkey, 9/7/1978,
- Skryne 'B' - Bye,

Round 7:

- Rathkenny 0-6, 0-3 Oldcastle, Kilskyre, 9/7/1978,
- Martinstown/Athboy 1-14, 1-4 St. Vincent's, Pairc Tailteann, 16/7/1978,
- Wolfe Tones 3-9, 0-2 Summerhill 'B', Dunshaughlin, 16/7/1978,
- Skryne 'B' 3-10, 2-5 Ballinabrackey, Athboy, 16/7/1978,
- Navan O'Mahonys 'B' - Bye,

Round 8:

- Oldcastle 1-7, 0-5 Wolfe Tones Ballinlough, 23/7/1978,
- Skryne 'B' 2-10, 1-11 Martinstown/Athboy, Kilberry, 30/7/1978,
- Ballinabrackey w, l Summerhill 'B',
- Navan O'Mahonys 'B' w, l St. Vincent's,
- Rathkenny - Bye,

Round 9:

- Wolfe Tones 1-9, 0-1 Rathkenny, Pairc Tailteann, 30/7/1978,
- Skryne 'B' w/o, scr St. Vincent's,
- Martinstown/Athboy w/o, scr Navan O'Mahonys 'B',
- Oldcastle w/o, scr Summerhill 'B',
- Ballinabrackey - Bye,

== Knock-out Stages ==
=== Finals ===
The teams in the semi-finals are the first and second placed teams from each group.

Semi-Finals
Kilmainhamwood	1-9
Skryne 'B'	1-6
Wolfe Tones	2-7
Duleek	3-8

Final
Kilmainhamwood	1-5
Duleek	0-9

Semi-final:

- Duleek 3-8, 2-7 Wolfe Tones, Pairc Tailteann, 13/8/1978,
- Kilmainhamwood 1-9, 1-6 Skryne 'B', Pairc Tailteann, 13/8/1978,

Final:

- Duleek 0-9, 1-5 Kilmainhamwood, Pairc Tailteann, 27/8/1978,
