= 1977 Meath Intermediate Football Championship =

Meath I.F.C.
- Season: 1977
- Champions: Dunshaughlin; 1st Intermediate Football Championship title
- Relegated: ???

The 1977 Meath Intermediate Football Championship is the 51st edition of the Meath GAA's premier club Gaelic football tournament for intermediate graded teams in County Meath, Ireland. The tournament consists of 18 teams. The championship starts with a group stage and then progresses to a knock out stage.

This was Duleek's return in the Intermediate grade after relegation from the S.F.C. the previous year.

Curraha and Nobber were promoted after claiming the 1976 Meath Junior Football Championship title and runners-up spot respectively.

On 2 October 1977, Dunshaughlin claimed their 1st Intermediate championship title when they defeated Nobber 0–13 to 0–6 in the final in Pairc Tailteann.

== Team changes ==
The following teams have changed division since the 1976 championship season.

=== From I.F.C. ===
Promoted to S.F.C.

- Castletown - (Intermediate Champions)

Relegated to 1977 J.A.F.C.

- St. Colmcille's

=== To I.F.C. ===
Regraded from S.F.C.

- Duleek

Promoted from 1976 J.A.F.C.

- Curraha - (Junior 'A' Champions)
- Nobber - (Junior Runners-Up)

== Group stage ==
There are 3 groups called Group A, B and C. The top finishers in Group A and B will qualify for the semi-finals. First place in Group C along with the runners-up in all the groups qualify for the quarter-finals.

=== Group A ===
Team	Pld	W	L	D	PF	PA	PD	Pts
Donaghmore	8	7	1	0	0	0	+0	14
Nobber	8	6	2	0	0	0	+0	12
Duleek	8	5	3	0	0	0	+0	10
Dunsany	8	5	3	0	0	0	+0	10
Rathkenny	8	4	4	0	0	0	+0	8
Kilcloon	8	4	4	0	0	0	+0	8
Kilmainhamwood	6	1	5	0	0	0	+0	2
Oldcastle	6	1	5	0	0	0	+0	2
Drumbaragh Emmets	6	0	6	0	0	0	+0	0

Round 1:

- Kilcloon 1–7, 1–6 Donaghmore, Dunshaughlin, 3/4/1977,
- Rathkenny 1–7, 1–5 Kilmainhamwood, Gibbstown, 3/4/1977,
- Nobber 0–4, 0–3 Oldcastle, Ballinlough, 3/4/1977,
- Duleek 3–12, 0–3 Drumbaragh, Pairc Tailteann, 3/4/1977,
- Dunsany - Bye,

Round 2:

- Donaghmore 2–12, 1–7 Dunsany, Skryne, 24/4/1977,
- Nobber 3–10, 3–2 Rathkenny, Castletown, 24/4/1977,
- Kilcloon 1–4, 0–3 Drumbaragh, Pairc Tailteann, 24/4/1977,
- Oldcastle w, l Duleek, Martry, 15/5/1977,
- Kilmainhamwood - Bye,

Round 3:

- Nobber 1–8, 0–5 Dunsany, Kilberry, 8/5/1977,
- Donaghmore 1–4, 1–3 Duleek, Seneschalstown, 8/5/1977,
- Kilcloon 2–8, 2–5 Kilmainhamwood, Pairc Tailteann, 8/5/1977,
- Oldcastle -vs- Drumbaragh, Kilskyre, 8/5/1977,
- Rathkenny - Bye,

Round 4:

- Nobber 1–13, 2–6 Drumbaragh, Kilskyre, 22/5/1977,
- Kilmainhamwood 3–6, 2–3 Duleek, Martry, 12/6/1977,
- Dunsany 2–5, 0–8 Oldcastle, Martry, 22/7/1977,
- Rathkenny w, l Kilcloon,
- Donaghmore - Bye,

Round 5:

- Donaghmore 1–6, 0–8 Rathkenny, Skryne, 12/6/1977,
- Kilcloon 3–11, 0–3 Oldcastle, Kildalkey, 12/6/1977,
- Dunsany 2–7, 1–8 Drumbaragh, Kildalkey, 12/6/1977,
- Nobber 1–6, 0–8 Kilmainhamwood, Castletown, 17/7/1977,
- Duleek - Bye,

Round 6:

- Donaghmore 3–13, 1–9 Oldcastle, Martry, 26/6/1977,
- Duleek 2–4, 1–6 Nobber, Kilberry, 26/6/1977,
- Rathkenny 2–12, 2–4 Drumbaragh, Seneschalstown, 26/7/1977,
- Dunsany 0–9, 0–6 Kilmainhamwood, Kilberry, 10/7/1977,
- Kilcloon - Bye,

Round 7:

- Nobber 3–6, 1–10 Kilcloon, Dunshaughlin, 3/7/1977,
- Donaghmore w, l Kilmainhamwood, Kilmessan, 3/7/1977,
- Duleek w, l Dunsany, Seneschalstown, 3/7/1977,
- Rathkenny 5–8, 4–7 Oldcastle, Martry, 10/7/1977,
- Drumbaragh - Bye,

Round 8:

- Donaghmore 2–13, 2–3 Drumbaragh, Pairc Tailteann, 17/7/1977,
- Dunsany 1–10, 0–7 Rathkenny, Duleek, 17/7/1977,
- Duleek 1–9, 2–4 Kilcloon, Pairc Tailteann, 17/7/1977,
- Kilmainhamwood -vs- Oldcastle,
- Nobber - Bye,

Round 9:

- Donaghmore 2–7, 2–3 Nobber, Pairc Tailteann, 22/7/1977,
- Duleek w, l Rathkenny, Seneschalstown, 22/7/1977,
- Dunsany 1–7, 2–4 Kilcloon, Summerhill, 21/8/1977,
- Kilmainhamwood -vs- Drumbaragh,
- Oldcastle - Bye,

=== Group B ===
Team	Pld	W	L	D	PF	PA	PD	Pts
Navan O'Mahonys 'B'	8	7	1	0	0	0	+0	14
Dunshaughlin	8	6	1	1	0	0	+0	13
Martinstown/Athboy	8	6	1	1	0	0	+0	13
Summerhill 'B'	6	2	2	2	0	0	+0	6
Curraha	8	3	5	0	0	0	+0	6
Ballinlough	7	2	5	0	0	0	+0	4
Slane	7	2	5	0	0	0	+0	4
St. Vincent's	6	2	4	0	0	0	+0	4
St. Mary's	8	1	7	0	0	0	+0	2

Round 1:

- Navan O'Mahonys 'B' 0–9, 0–2 St. Mary's, Duleek, 3/4/1977,
- Dunshaughlin 0–5, 0–5 Summerhill 'B', Kildalkey, 3/4/1977,
- Martinstown/Athboy 0–12, 1–3 Slane, Kilmessan, 3/4/1977,
- Ballinlough 1–10, 1–9 Curraha, Martry, 10/4/1977,
- St. Vincent's - Bye,

Round 2:

- Navan O'Mahonys 'B' 1–11, 1–2 Curraha, Seneschalstown, 24/4/1977,
- St. Vincent's 1–6, 1–4 Slane, Duleek, 24/4/1977,
- St. Mary's 1–9, 1–4 Ballinlough, Kilberry, 24/4/1977,
- Martinstown/Athboy 1–5, 0–7 Dunshaughlin, Trim, 28/8/1977,
- Summerhill 'B' - Bye,

Round 3:

- Dunshaughlin 2–10, 0–4 Ballinlough, Kilberry, 8/5/1977,
- Martinstown/Athboy 0–13, 0–5 St. Mary's, Kilmessan, 8/5/1977,
- Summerhill 'B' v Slane, Pairc Tailteann, 8/5/1977,
- Curraha 3–7, 1–11 St. Vincent's, Stamullen, 28/5/1977,
- Navan O'Mahonys 'B' - Bye,

Round 4:

- St. Vincent's w, l St. Mary's, Duleek, 15/5/1977,
- Navan O'Mahonys 'B' 1–8, 0–8 Martinstown/Athboy, Kilmessan, 22/5/1977,
- Ballinlough 2–11, 0–6 Summerhill 'B', Pairc Tailteann, 22/5/1977,
- Dunshaughlin 1–6, 1–3 Curraha, Donaghmore, 22/5/1977,
- Slane - Bye,

Round 5:

- Martinstown/Athboy w, l Ballinlough, Kilskyre, 29/5/1977,
- Navan O'Mahonys 'B' 3–4, 0–7 Slane, Kilbride, 12/6/1977,
- Dunshaughlin 1–11, 1–3 St. Vincent's, Duleek, 12/6/1977,
- Summerhill 'B' 1–10, 1–1 St. Mary's, Pairc Tailteann, 12/6/1977,
- Curraha - Bye,

Round 6:

- Summerhill 'B' +1, -1 Curraha, Dunshaughlin, 26/6/1977,
- Slane 3–13, 2–7 Ballinlough, Kilberry, 26/6/1977,
- Martinstown/Athboy 1–15, 0–1 St. Vincent's, Skryne, 26/6/1977,
- Dunshaughlin 0–11, 1–3 Navan O'Mahonys 'B', Duleek, 26/6/1977,
- St. Mary's - Bye,

Round 7:

- Navan O'Mahonys 'B' w, l Ballinlough, Athboy, 3/7/1977,
- Slane w, l St. Mary's, Kilberry, 3/7/1977,
- St. Vincent's v Summerhill, Dunshaughlin, 3/7/1977,
- Martinstown/Athboy w, l Curraha, Skryne, 10/7/1977,
- Dunshaughlin - Bye,

Round 8:

- Martinstown/Athboy 0–10, 2–4 Summerhill 'B', Skryne, 17/7/1977,
- Navan O'Mahonys 'B' 2–12, 1–2 St. Vincent's, Martry, 17/7/1977,
- Dunshaughlin 1–7, 0–8 Slane, Duleek, 17/7/1977,
- Curraha w, l St. Mary's,
- Ballinlough - Bye,

Round 9:

- Curraha 2–9, 2–3 Slane, Duleek, 22/7/1977,
- Navan O'Mahonys 'B' 1–12, 0–3 Summerhill 'B', Dunshaughlin, 27/7/1977,
- Dunshaughlin w/o, scr St. Mary's,
- Ballinlough -vs- St. Vincent's,
- Martinstown/Athboy - Bye,

Quarter-final Playoffs:

- Dunshaughlin 2–4, 1–6 Martinstown/Athboy, Kilberry, 11/9/1977,

== Knock-out Stages ==
=== Finals ===
The teams in the semi-finals are the first and second placed teams from each group.

Semi-Finals
Donaghmore	0–10
Dunshaughlin	3–6
Navan O'Mahonys 'B'	0–5
Nobber	1–12

Final
Dunshaughlin	0–13
Nobber	0–6

Semi-final:

- Dunshaughlin 3–6, 0–10 Donaghmore, Trim, 11/9/1977,
- Nobber 1–12, 0–5 Navan O'Mahonys 'B', Kilberry, 11/9/1977,

Final:

- Dunshaughlin 0–13, 0–6 Nobber, Pairc Tailteann, 2/10/1977,
