= 1975 Meath Intermediate Football Championship =

Meath I.F.C.
- Season: 1975
- Champions: Moylagh; 1st Intermediate Football Championship title
- Relegated: Ballinabrackey; St. Brigid's Ballinacree

The 1975 Meath Intermediate Football Championship is the 49th edition of the Meath GAA's premier club Gaelic football tournament for intermediate graded teams in County Meath, Ireland. The tournament consists of 18 teams. The championship starts with a group stage and then progresses to a knock out stage.

Navan O'Mahonys 'B's' and St. Colmcille's were promoted after claiming the 1974 Meath Junior Football Championship title and runners-up spot respectively.

In early 1975, Gibbstown joined forces with last year's I.F.C. champions to form the Wolfe Tones and were hence promoted from the I.F.C. Martry also amalgamated with S.F.C. finalists from 1974 Bohermeen, and were also promoted.

On 5 October 1975, Moylagh claimed their 1st Intermediate championship title when they defeated Dunshaughlin 2-5 to 0-9 in the final in Pairc Tailteann, and thus entered the top flight of Meath club football for the first time.

Ballinabrackey were relegated to the 1976 J.F.C. after just 3 years in the middle grade as well as St. Brigid's Ballinacree.

== Team changes ==
The following teams have changed division since the 1974 championship season.

=== From I.F.C. ===
Promoted to S.F.C.

- St. John's - (Intermediate Champions, Amalgamated with St. John's to form the Wolfe Tones)
- Gibbstown - (Amalgamated with St. John's to form the Wolfe Tones)
- Martry - (Amalgamated with Bohermeen to form Martry Harps in the S.F.C.)

Relegated to 1975 J.A.F.C.

- Boardsmill
- Enfield
- Kilallon

Relegated to 1975 J.B.F.C.

- Drumree

=== To I.F.C. ===
Regraded from S.F.C.

- Slane

Promoted from 1975 J.A.F.C.

- Summerhill 'B' - (Junior 'A' Champions)
- Drumbaragh Emmets - (Junior Runners-Up)

== Group stage ==
There are 2 groups called Group A and B. The top two finishers in Group A and B will qualify for the semi-finals.

=== Group A ===
Team	Pld	W	L	D	PF	PA	PD	Pts
St. Vincent's	8	7	1	0	0	0	+0	14
Dunshaughlin	8	7	1	0	0	0	+0	14
Dunsany	8	6	2	0	0	0	+0	12
Oldcastle	8	5	3	0	0	0	+0	10
Kilmainhamwood	8	4	3	1	0	0	+0	9
Donaghmore	8	3	5	0	0	0	+0	6
St. Colmcille's	8	1	5	2	0	0	+0	4
Slane	8	1	6	1	0	0	+0	3
St. Brigid's Ballinacree	8	0	8	0	0	0	+0	0

Round 1:

- St. Vincent's 1-12, 1-6 Dunsany, Skryne, 6/4/1975,
- Kilmainhamwood 1-8, 1-3 Oldcastle, Kells, 6/4/1975,
- Donaghmore 2-7, 1-4 St. Brigid's, Pairc Tailteann, 6/4/1975,
- Slane 1-6, 1-6 St. Colmcille's, Duleek, 6/4/1975,
- Dunshaughlin - Bye,

Round 2:

- Dunshaughlin 3-10, 1-4 Oldcastle, Trim, 20/4/1975,
- Slane w, l St. Brigid's, Kells, 20/4/1975,
- St. Vincent's 0-10, 0-9 Kilmainhamwood, Pairc Tailteann, 4/5/1975,
- Donaghmore 5-8, 3-5 St. Colmcille's, Duleek, 4/5/1975,
- Dunsany - Bye,

Round 3:

- Dunsany w, l Oldcastle, Martry, 4/5/1975,
- St. Vincent's w, l St. Brigid's, Kilberry, 11/5/1975,
- Kilmainhamwood w, l Slane, Castletown, 11/5/1975,
- Dunshaughlin 2-10, 1-4 Donaghmore, Skryne, 8/6/1975,
- St. Colmcille's - Bye,

Round 4:

- Dunshaughlin 1-16, 1-6 Slane, Skryne, 25/5/1975,
- Kilmainhamwood 1-10, 2-7 St. Colmcille's, Seneschalstown, 25/5/1975,
- Dunsany 2-9, 0-3 St. Brigid's, Gibbstown, 8/6/1975,
- St. Vincent's 0-12, 1-5 Donaghmore, Stamullen, 15/6/1975,
- Oldcastle - Bye,

Round 5:

- Oldcastle 1-13, 2-7 St. Colmcille's, Kilberry, 8/6/1975,
- St. Vincent's w, l Dunshaughlin, Skryne, 29/6/1975,
- Dunsany w, l Slane, Kilberry, 29/6/1975,
- Kilmainhamwood w, l St. Brigid's, Kells, 26/6/1975,
- Donaghmore - Bye,

Round 6:

- St. Vincent's w, l St. Colmcille's, Duleek, 13/7/1975,
- Dunshaughlin w, l Kilmainhamwood, Seneschalstown, 13/7/1975,
- Dunsany w, l Donaghmore, Skryne, 13/7/1975,
- Oldcastle w, l St. Brigid's,
- Slane - Bye,

Round 7:

- Dunshaughlin 1-7, 0-5 Dunsany, Skryne, 20/7/1975,
- Kilmainhamwood w, l Donaghmore, Seneschalstown, 20/7/1975,
- St. Colmcille's w, l St. Brigid's, Kilberry, 20/7/1975,
- Oldcastle w, l Slane,
- St. Vincent's - Bye,

Round 8:

- Dunsany w, l Kilmainhamwood, Martry, 3/8/1975,
- Oldcastle w, l St. Vincent's, Martry, 3/8/1975,
- Dunshaughlin 4-12, 0-5 St. Colmcille's, Duleek, 17/8/1975,
- Donaghmore w, l Slane,
- St. Brigid's - Bye,

Round 9:

- Dunshaughlin w, l St. Brigid's,
- St. Vincent's w, l Slane,
- Oldcastle w, l Donaghmore,
- Dunsany w, l St. Colmcille's,
- Kilmainhamwood - Bye,

=== Group B ===
Team	Pld	W	L	D	PF	PA	PD	Pts
Castletown	8	7	1	0	0	0	+0	14
Moylagh	8	6	2	0	0	0	+0	12
Martinstown	8	5	3	0	0	0	+0	10
Rathkenny	8	5	3	0	0	0	+0	10
St. Mary's	8	5	3	0	0	0	+0	10
Navan O'Mahonys 'B'	8	4	4	0	0	0	+0	8
Ballinlough	8	2	6	0	0	0	+0	4
Ballinabrackey	8	1	7	0	0	0	+0	2
Kilcloon	8	1	7	0	0	0	+0	2

Round 1:

- Castletown 1-10, 0-2 Ballinlough, Martry, 6/4/1975,
- Rathkenny 5-4, 2-4 Ballinabrackey, Athboy, 6/4/1975,
- Martinstown 2-9, 1-4 Kilcloon, Summerhill, 13/4/1975,
- St. Mary's 2-6, 0-11 Moylagh, Kilberry, 13/4/1975,
- Navan O'Mahonys 'B' - Bye,

Round 2:

- Ballinlough 2-7, 0-7 Kilcloon, Pairc Tailteann, 20/4/1975,
- Navan O'Mahonys 'B' 3-9, 1-6 Martinstown, Martry, 27/4/1975,
- Moylagh 0-9, 0-7 Rathkenny, Kells, 4/5/1975,
- St. Mary's w, l Ballinabrackey, Dunshaughlin, 4/5/1975,
- Castletown - Bye,

Round 3:

- Castletown 2-7, 0-5 Martinstown, Kells, 25/5/1975,
- Moylagh 1-8, 0-6 Ballinlough, Kilskyre, 25/5/1975,
- Rathkenny w, l Kilcloon, Dunshaughlin, 1/6/1975,
- St. Mary's w, l Navan O'Mahonys 'B', Dunshaughlin, 31/8/1975,
- Ballinabrackey - Bye,

Round 4:

- Rathkenny 4-7, 1-10 Navan O'Mahonys 'B', Kells, 8/6/1975,
- Moylagh 2-7, 0-4 Castletown, Gibbstown, 8/6/1975,
- St. Mary's 4-7, 1-10 Ballinlough, Kilberry, 15/6/1975,
- Ballinabrackey w, l Kilcloon, Summerhill, 15/6/1975,
- Martinstown - Bye,

Round 5:

- Castletown 0-7, 1-3 Rathkenny, Pairc Tailteann, 15/6/1975,
- Navan O'Mahonys 'B' w, l Ballinlough, Kells, 29/6/1975,
- Martinstown w, l Ballinabrackey, Ballivor, 13/7/1975,
- Kilcloon w, l Moylagh, Trim, 13/7/1975,
- St. Mary's - Bye,

Round 6:

- Castletown 1-11, 2-3 St. Mary's, Seneschalstown, 13/7/1975,
- Navan O'Mahonys 1-11, 1-5 Kilcloon, Kilmessan, 20/7/1975,
- Moylagh w, l Martinstown, Kilskyre, 3/8/1975,
- Ballinlough w, l Ballinabrackey,
- Rathkenny - Bye,

Round 7:

- Castletown 3-8, 1-6 Navan O'Mahonys 'B', Seneschalstown, 17/8/1975,
- Moylagh 3-6, 0-6 Ballinabrackey, Athboy, 17/8/1975,
- St. Mary's w, l Kilcloon,
- Martinstown w, l Rathkenny,
- Ballinlough - Bye,

Round 8:

- Rathkenny 1-8, 2-3 St. Mary's, Duleek, 17/8/1975,
- Castletown w, l Kilcloon, Kilskyre, 31/8/1975,
- Martinstown w, l Ballinlough,
- Navan O'Mahonys w/o, scr Ballinabrackey,
- Moylagh - Bye,

Round 9:

- Moylagh 4-9, 3-4 Navan O'Mahonys 'B', Kells, 24/8/1975,
- Rathkenny w, l Ballinlough, Martry, 24/8/1975,
- Martinstown w, l St. Mary's,
- Castletown w/o, scr Ballinabrackey,
- Kilcloon - Bye,

== Knock-out Stages ==
The teams in the semi-finals are the first and second placed teams from each group.

Semi-Finals
St. Vincent's	0-5
Moylagh	2-10
Castletown	0-7
Dunshaughlin	1-7

Final
Moylagh	2-5
Dunshaughlin	0-9

Semi-final:

- Moylagh 2-10, 1-5 St. Vincent's, Kells, 7/9/1975,
- Dunshaughlin 1-7, 0-7 Castletown, Kells, 7/9/1975,

Final:

- Moylagh 2-5, 0-9 Dunshaughlin, Pairc Tailteann, 5/10/1975,
