= 1976 Meath Intermediate Football Championship =

Meath I.F.C.
- Season: 1976
- Champions: Castletown; 3rd Intermediate Football Championship title
- Relegated: St. Colmcille's

The 1976 Meath Intermediate Football Championship is the 50th edition of the Meath GAA's premier club Gaelic football tournament for intermediate graded teams in County Meath, Ireland. The tournament consists of 17 teams. The championship starts with a group stage and then progresses to a knock out stage.

Summerhill 'B's' and Drumbaragh Emmets were promoted after claiming the 1975 Meath Junior Football Championship title and runners-up spot respectively.

This was Martinstown/Athboy's first year in existence after Intermediate club Martinstown (established in 1964) and Junior club Athboy joined forces in early 1976. I

On 3 October 1976, Castletown claimed their 3rd Intermediate championship title when they defeated Kilmainhamwood 2–5 to 0–7 in the final in Pairc Tailteann.

St. Colmcille's were relegated to the 1977 J.F.C. after failing to win a match this season. The club were relegated to the Junior ranks for the first time since its formation in 1971 when forming from Intermediate club Star of the Sea and Junior club Shallon.

== Team changes ==
The following teams have changed division since the 1975 championship season.

=== From I.F.C. ===
Promoted to S.F.C.

- Moylagh - (Intermediate Champions)

Relegated to 1976 J.A.F.C.

- Ballinabrackey
- St. Brigid's Ballinacree

=== To I.F.C. ===
Regraded from S.F.C.

- None

Promoted from 1975 J.A.F.C.

- Summerhill 'B' - (Junior 'A' Champions)
- Drumbaragh Emmets - (Junior Runners-Up)
- Athboy - (Amalgamated with Martinstown to form Martinstown/Athboy)

== Group stage ==
There are 2 groups called Group A and B. The top two finishers in Group A and B will qualify for the semi-finals.

=== Group A ===
Team	Pld	W	L	D	PF	PA	PD	Pts
Dunshaughlin	8	7	1	0	0	0	+0	14
Kilmainhamwood	8	6	0	2	0	0	+0	14
Drumbaragh	8	4	2	2	0	0	+0	10
Navan O'Mahonys 'B'	8	4	3	1	0	0	+0	9
Ballinlough	8	4	3	1	0	0	+0	9
Kilcloon	8	3	3	2	0	0	+0	8
Summerhill 'B'	8	3	5	0	0	0	+0	6
Rathkenny	8	1	7	0	0	0	+0	2
St. Colmcille's	8	0	8	0	0	0	+0	0

Round 1:

- Kilmainhamwood 2-10, 2-2 St. Colmcille's, Seneschalstown, 28/3/1976,
- Dunshaughlin 0-12, 0-8 Rathkenny, Skryne, 28/3/1976,
- Navan O'Mahonys 'B' 3-1, 0-5 Summerhill 'B', Trim, 28/3/1976,
- Ballinlough 0–6, 1-3 Drumbaragh, Athboy, 28/3/1976,
- Kilcloon - Bye,

Round 2:

- Kilmainhamwood 4-7, 1-11 Dunshaughlin, Martry, 11/4/1976,
- Rathkenny 2-13, 0-5 St. Colmcille's, Duleek, 11/4/1976,
- Navan O'Mahonys 'B' w, l Ballinlough, Kilberry, 11/4/1976,
- Summerhill 'B' 1-3, 0-5 Kilcloon, Dunshaughlin, 11/4/1976,
- Drumbaragh - Bye,

Round 3:

- Dunshaughlin 2-9, 0-6 Kilcloon, Summerhill, 25/4/1976,
- Ballinlough 0-13, 1-5 Rathkenny, Martry, 11/4/1976,
- Navan O'Mahonys 'B' w, l St. Colmcille's, Seneschalstown, 11/4/1976,
- Drumbaragh +1, -1 Summerhill 'B', Pairc Tailteann, 11/4/1976,
- Kilmainhamwood - Bye,

Round 4:

- Kilcloon 0-17, 0-4 St. Colmcille's, Skryne, 16/5/1976,
- Drumbaragh 0-12, 0-11 Rathkenny, Martry, 16/5/1976,
- Kilmainhamwood 1–7, 1-7 Navan O'Mahonys 'B', Kilskyre, 23/5/1976,
- Dunshaughlin 2-9, 1-3 Ballinlough, Pairc Tailteann, 27/6/1976,
- Summerhill 'B' - Bye,

Round 5:

- Kilmainhamwood 0-9, 0-5 Summerhill 'B', Athboy, 13/6/1976,
- Ballinlough 3-11, 0-4 Kilcloon, Trim, 13/6/1976,
- Navan O'Mahonys 'B' w, l Rathkenny, Kilbride, 20/6/1976,
- Drumbaragh w, l St. Colmcille's, Seneschalstown, 20/6/1976,
- Dunshaughlin - Bye,

Round 6:

- Dunshaughlin 1-11, 1-6 Drumbaragh, Kilberry, 13/6/1976,
- Kilcloon 2-9, 2-7 Navan O'Mahonys 'B', Dunshaughlin, 27/6/1976,
- Kilmainhamwood 0-14, 0-5 Ballinlough, Kilskyre, 11/7/1976,
- Summerhill 'B' w, l Rathkenny,
- St. Colmcille's - Bye,

Round 7:

- Drumbaragh 2–5, 0-11 Kilcloon, Pairc Tailteann, 4/7/1976,
- Dunshaughlin 3-11, 0-1 Navan O'Mahonys, Seneschalstown, 11/7/1976,
- Kilmainhamwood w/o, scr Rathkenny, Kells, 18/7/1976,
- Summerhill 'B' w, l St. Colmcille's,
- Ballinlough - Bye,

Round 8:

- Dunshaughlin w/o, scr St. Colmcille's, Seneschalstown, 4/7/1976,
- Kilmainhamwood 1–8, 1-8 Kilcloon, Pairc Tailteann, 8/8/1976,
- Ballinlough w, l Summerhill 'B', Athboy, 18/7/1976,
- Drumbaragh w, l Navan O'Mahonys 'B',
- Rathkenny - Bye,

Round 9:

- Kilmainhamwood 3-9, 1-3 Drumbaragh, Kells, 1/8/1976,
- Ballinlough w/o, scr St. Colmcille's,
- Kilcloon w/o, scr Rathkenny,
- Dunshaughlin w, l Ballinlough,
- Navan O'Mahonys 'B' - Bye,

=== Group B ===
Team	Pld	W	L	D	PF	PA	PD	Pts
Martinstown/Athboy	7	5	0	2	0	0	+0	12
Castletown	7	4	1	2	0	0	+0	10
Donaghmore	7	5	2	0	0	0	+0	10
St. Vincent's	7	3	1	3	0	0	+0	9
Slane	7	3	4	0	0	0	+0	6
St. Mary's	7	2	4	1	0	0	+0	5
Oldcastle	7	2	5	0	0	0	+0	4
Dunsany	7	0	7	0	0	0	+0	0

Round 1:

- Castletown 2-5, 1-5 Dunsany, Seneschalstown, 28/3/1976,
- Donaghmore 1-11, 3-2 Oldcastle, Martry, 28/3/1976,
- Martinstown/Athboy 1–9, 2-6 St. Vincent's, Dunshaughlin, 28/3/1976,
- St. Mary's w, l Slane, Castletown, 20/6/1976,

Round 2:

- Castletown 2–6, 0-12 St. Vincent's, Skryne, 11/4/1976,
- Slane 0-5, 0-3 Donaghmore, Skryne, 11/4/1976,
- Oldcastle 0-12, 2-3 St. Mary's, Pairc Tailteann, 11/4/1976,
- Martinstown/Athboy 2-14, 1-5 Dunsany, Dunshaughlin, 25/4/1976,

Round 3:

- Donaghmore 2-12, 1-2 St. Mary's, Skryne, 25/4/1976,
- Slane 2-6, 2-4 Oldcastle, Martry, 25/4/1976,
- St. Vincent's 2-4, 2-2 Dunsany, Dunshaughlin, 23/5/1976,
- Castletown 0–8, 1-5 Martinstown/Athboy, Martry, 30/5/1976,

Round 4:

- Martinstown/Athboy 0-11, 0-8 Donaghmore, Seneschalstown, 13/6/1976,
- St. Mary's 2-13, 1-7 Dunsany, Skryne, 13/6/1976,
- St. Vincent's 1-9, 0-9 Slane, Skryne, 13/6/1976,
- Castletown 0-13, 0-8 Oldcastle, Kells, 13/6/1976,

Round 5:

- Donaghmore 2-14, 0-6 St. Vincent's, Seneschalstown, 27/6/1976,
- Oldcastle w, l Dunsany, Kells, 27/6/1976,
- Castletown 0-8, 1-2 Slane, Kilberry, 18/7/1976*,
- Martinstown/Athboy w/o, scr St. Mary's,

Round 6:

- St. Vincent's d, d St. Mary's, Duleek, 4/7/1976,
- Slane w/o, scr Dunsany, Skryne, 4/7/1976,
- Donaghmore 2-7, 1-8 Castletown, Seneschalstown, 11/7/1976,
- Martinstown/Athboy w, l Oldcastle, Kilskyre, 11/7/1976,

Round 7:

- St. Vincent's w, l Oldcastle, Kilberry, 18/7/1976,
- Castletown w, l St. Mary's,
- Martinstown/Athboy w, l Slane,
- Donaghmore w, l Dunsany,

Quarter-final Playoffs:

- Castletown w, l Donaghmore, Duleek, 15/8/1976,

- The Round 5 match between Castletown and Slane in Kilberry was abandoned after 55 minutes when a Slane player refused to leave the field of play after being sent off by the referee. The match was eventually awarded to Castletown with the scoreline at that time of the match at a later date by the County Board.

== Knock-out Stages ==
=== Finals ===
The teams in the semi-finals are the first and second placed teams from each group.

Semi-Finals
Dunshaughlin	0-4 R
Castletown	0-11 R
Martinstown/Athboy	1-4
Kilmainhamwood	1-6

Final
Castletown	2-5
Kilmainhamwood	0-7

Semi-final:

- Kilmainhamwood 1-6, 1-4 Martinstown/Athboy, Pairc Tailteann, 29/8/1976,
- Castletown 2–4, 0-10 Dunshaughlin, Pairc Tailteann, 5/9/1976,
- Castletown 0-11, 0-4 Dunshaughlin, Pairc Tailteann, 19/9/1976, (Replay)

Final:

- Castletown 2-5, 0-7 Kilmainhamwood, Pairc Tailteann, 3/10/1976,
