= 1978 Meath Senior Football Championship =

Meath S.F.C.
- Season: 1978
- Champions: Walterstown; 1st Senior Championship Title
- Relegated: Dunderry; Kilbride
- Leinster SCFC: Walterstown (Quarter-final) Walterstown 1-9, 2-11 Walsh Island
- All Ireland SCFC: n/a
- Winning Captain: Christy Bowens (Walterstown)
- Man of the Match: ??? (Walterstown)
- Matches: 40

The 1978 Meath Senior Football Championship is the 86th edition of the Meath GAA's premier club Gaelic football tournament for senior graded teams in County Meath, Ireland. The tournament consists of 16 teams, with the winner going on to represent Meath in the Leinster Senior Club Football Championship. The championship starts with a group stage and then progresses to a knock out stage.

Summerhill were the defending champions after they defeated Seneschalstown after a replay in the previous years final. However, they lost their crown held for 4 years when losing to Walterstown in the final.

This was Dunshaughlin's second ever period in the senior grade after claiming the 1977 Meath Intermediate Football Championship title.

On 10 September 1978, Walterstown claimed their 1st Senior Championship title, when defeating Summerhill 0-7 to 0-6 in Pairc Tailteann, Navan. Christy Bowens raised the Keegan Cup for "The Blacks".

Dunderry and Kilbride were regraded to the 1979 I.F.C. at the end of the campaign.

== Team changes ==
The following teams have changed division since the 1977 championship season.

=== To S.F.C. ===
Promoted from I.F.C.

- Dunshaughlin - (Intermediate Champions)

=== From S.F.C. ===
Regraded to I.F.C.

- Wolfe Tones

== Group stage ==
=== Group A ===
Team	Pld	W	L	D	PF	PA	PD	Pts
Walterstown	7	6	1	0	0	0	+0	12
Trim	7	6	1	0	0	0	+0	12
Skryne	7	5	2	0	0	0	+0	10
St. Patrick's	7	5	2	0	0	0	+0	10
Martry Harps	7	3	4	0	0	0	+0	6
Gaeil Colmcille	7	1	5	1	0	0	+0	3
Syddan	7	1	6	0	0	0	+0	2
Dunderry	7	0	6	1	0	0	+0	1

Round 1:

- Skryne 0-7, 1-3 Syddan, Seneschalstown, 9/4/1978,
- Walterstown 0-8, 0-5 Gaeil Colmcille, Martry, 9/4/1978,
- St. Patrick's 0-7, 0-1 Dunderry, Donaghmore, 9/4/1978,
- Trim 3-7, 1-4 Martry Harps, Kilmessan, 9/4/1978,

Round 2:

- Trim 1-10, 0-9 Skryne, Pairc Tailteann, 23/4/1978,
- Dunderry 1-3, 1-3 Gaeil Colmcille, Athboy, 23/4/1978,
- St. Patrick's 2-8, 1-5 Walterstown, Skryne, 23/4/1978,
- Martry Harps 2-5, 1-5 Syddan, Seneschalstown, 30/4/1978,

Round 3:

- Skryne 7-11, 1-5 Martry Harps, Seneschalstown, 14/5/1978,
- Walterstown 2-8, 0-4 Dunderry, Kilberry, 14/5/1978,
- St. Patrick's 2-6, 0-10 Gaeil Colmcille, Castletown, 14/5/1978,
- Trim 2-9, 2-7 Syddan, Kells, 14/5/1978,

Round 4:

- Skryne 3-13, 1-4 Gaeil Colmcille, Dunshaughlin, 28/5/1978,
- Martry Harps 2-11, 0-5 Dunderry, Kells, 28/5/1978,
- St. Patrick's 3-13, 1-6 Syddan, Seneschalstown, 4/6/1978,
- Walterstown 1-12, 0-4 Trim, Skryne, 4/6/1978,

Round 5:

- St. Patrick's 2-8, 2-7 Martry Harps, Skryne, 11/6/1978,
- Trim 2-9, 0-5 Gaeil Colmcille, Athboy, 11/6/1978,
- Skryne 3-12, 0-3 Dunderry, Kilmessan, 11/6/1978,
- Walterstown 3-11, 0-1 Syddan, Kilberry, 25/6/1978,

Round 6:

- Skryne 1-14, 3-6 St. Patrick's, Seneschalstown, 25/6/1978,
- Walterstown 4-8, 1-4 Martry Harps, Athboy, 9/7/1978,
- Trim 1-17, 0-2 Dunderry, Dunshaughlin, 9/7/1978,
- Gaeil Colmcille w, l Syddan,

Round 7:

- Trim 2-7, 2-3 St. Patrick's, Pairc Tailteann, 16/7/1978,
- Martry Harps 0-8, 0-3 Gaeil Colmcille, Kilberry, 16/7/1978,
- Syddan 3-10, 1-4 Dunderry, Kilberry, 16/7/1978,
- Walterstown 1-7, 0-5 Skryne, Duleek, 16/7/1978,

=== Group B ===
Team	Pld	W	L	D	PF	PA	PD	Pts
Summerhill	7	7	0	0	0	0	+0	14
Navan O'Mahonys	7	6	1	0	0	0	+0	12
Seneschalstown	7	4	2	1	0	0	+0	9
Castletown	7	3	4	0	0	0	+0	6
Moylagh	7	3	4	0	0	0	+0	6
Dunshaughlin	7	2	5	0	0	0	+0	4
Ballivor	7	1	5	1	0	0	+0	3
Kilbride	7	1	6	0	0	0	+0	2

Round 1

- Navan O'Mahonys 1-10, 1-6 Seneschalstown, Kilberry, 9/4/1978,
- Summerhill 3-8, 2-5 Moylagh, Kilberry, 9/4/1978,
- Castletown 2-8, 0-4 Kilbride, Duleek, 9/4/1978,
- Dunshaughlin 1-8, 1-7 Ballivor, Pairc Tailteann, 9/4/1978,

Round 2

- Moylagh 1-16, 0-8 Kilbride, Pairc Tailteann, 23/4/1978,
- Navan O'Mahonys 3-11, 0-6 Ballivor, Trim, 23/4/1978,
- Seneschalstown 0-7, 0-5 Dunshaughlin, Kilmessan, 23/4/1978,
- Summerhill 2-8, 1-4 Castletown, Kilberry, 23/4/1978,

Round 3

- Seneschalstown 1-12, 4-3 Ballivor, Trim, 14/5/1978,
- Summerhill 2-10, 0-6 Kilbride, Kilmessan, 14/5/1978,
- Castletown 0-7, 0-5 Moylagh, Ballinlough, 14/5/1978,
- Navan O'Mahonys 2-8, 1-5 Dunshaughlin, Skryne, 14/5/1978,

Round 4

- Seneschalstown 3-13, 3-8 Moylagh, Kilberry, 28/5/1978,
- Navan O'Mahonys 2-9, 0-2 Castletown, Kilberry, 4/6/1978,
- Summerhill 0-17, 0-4 Dunshaughlin, Kilmessan, 30/7/1978,
- Kilbride w/o, scr Ballivor, Dunshaughlin, 30/7/1978,

Round 5

- Summerhill 2-6, 1-8 Navan O'Mahonys, Trim, 25/6/1978,
- Seneschalstown 1-12, 0-2 Kilbride, Duleek, 25/6/1978,
- Moylagh 1-9, 0-6 Dunshaughlin, Pairc Tailteann, 25/6/1978,
- Ballivor w/o, scr Castletown,

Round 6:

- Navan O'Mahonys 2-13, 0-6 Moylagh, Athboy, 9/7/1978,
- Summerhill 3-18, 1-4 Ballivor, Kildalkey, 9/7/1978,
- Seneschalstown 1-10, 2-3 Castletown, Pairc Tailteann, 9/7/1978,
- Dunshaughlin w, l Kilbride, Duleek,

Round 7:

- Summerhill 1-7, 0-6 Seneschalstown, Dunshaughlin, 16/7/1978,
- Navan O'Mahonys 5-16, 1-4 Kilbride, Skryne, 16/7/1978,
- Castletown 2-8, 1-9 Dunshaughlin,
- Moylagh w/o, scr Ballivor,

== Knock-out Stages ==
The winners and runners up of each group qualify for the semi-finals.

Semi-finals
1	Walterstown	3-9
4	Navan O'Mahonys	1-7
3	Summerhill	0-8
2	Trim	0-2

Final
Walterstown	0-7
Summerhill	0-6

Semi-finals:

- Walterstown 3-9, 1-7 Navan O'Mahonys, Pairc Tailteann, 20/8/1978,
- Summerhill 0-8, 0-2 Trim, Pairc Tailteann, 27/8/1978,

Final:

- Walterstown 0-7, 0-6 Summerhill, Pairc Tailteann, 10/9/1978,

== Leinster Senior Club Football Championship ==
Quarter-final:

- Walsh Island 2-11, 1-9 Walterstown, O'Connor Park, 29/10/1978,
