= 1977–78 All-Ireland Senior Club Football Championship =

- Teams: 33
- Champions: Thomond College (1st title)
- Runners-up: St John's

The 1977–78 All-Ireland Senior Club Football Championship was the eighth staging of the All-Ireland Senior Club Football Championship since its establishment by the Gaelic Athletic Association in 1970-71.

Austin Stacks were the defending champions, however, they were beaten by Thomond College in the semi-final of the Munster club Championship.

On 26 March 1978, Thomond College won the championship following a 2-14 to 1-03 defeat of St John's in the All-Ireland final at Croke Park. It remains their only championship title.

== Munster ==
=== First round ===
27 November 1977 First round	Kilrush Shamrocks	1-04 - 3-07	Nemo Rangers	The Cricket Field
	L McNamara 1-0, B O'Reilly 0-2, J O'Halloran 0-1, A Moloney 0-1.		S Coughlan 1-6, L Good 1-0, J Barrett 1-0, K Collins 0-1.

27 November 1977 First round	Austin Stacks	0-10 - 0-03	Loughmore–Castleiney	Austin Stack Park
	M Sheehy 0-2, J O'Keeffe 0-2, JL McEligott 0-2, P McCarthy 0-1, T Sweeney 0-1, D Long 0-1, F Ryan 0-1.		T Kiely 0-2, J Meagher 0-1.

=== Semi-finals ===
12 December 1977 Semi-final	Thomond College	2-06 - 2-06	Austin Stacks	Gaelic Grounds
	G Dillon 1-1, M Kilcoyne 1-0, R Bell 0-2, J Dunne 0-2, P Spillane 0-1.		M Sheehy 1-3, J Power 1-0, G Power 0-1, P McCarthy 0-1, D Long 0-1.

12 December 1977 Semi-final	Nemo Rangers	2-14 - 1-04	Ardmore	Páirc Mac Gearailt
	D Linehan 1-4, N Morgan 1-2, S Coughlan 0-3, D Allen 0-3, K Brady 0-1, L Good 0-1.		D Hennessy 1-1, J Hennessy 0-1, J Dunne 0-1, F North 0-1.

18 December 1977 Semi-final replay	Thomond College	1-10 - 3-04	Austin Stacks	Páirc Uí Chaoimh
	J O'Connell 2-0, P Spillane 1-1, R Bell 0-1, G Dillon 0-1, J Dunne 0-1.		M Sheehy 1-6, C Mangan 0-1, D Long 0-1, F Ryan 0-1, P Moriarty 0-1.

15 January 1978 Semi-final 2nd replay	Thomond College	2-18 - 3-15 (aet)	Austin Stacks	Páirc Uí Chaoimh
	M Kilcoyne 1-3, B Talty 0-6, P Spillane 0-5, J Dunne 1-1, J O'Connell 0-1, T Harkin 0-1, M Houston 0-1.		M Sheehy 1-11, G Power 1-2, P McCarthy 1-1, JL McEligott 0-1.

15 January 1978 Semi-final 3rd replay	Thomond College	3-08 - 2-05	Austin Stacks	Páirc Uí Chaoimh
	P Spillane 2-1, B Talty 0-5, R Bell 1-1, D Smyth 0-1.		M Sheehy 1-2, JL McEligott 1-0, G Power 0-1, P McCarthy 0-1, P Moriarty 0-1.

=== Final ===
5 February 1978 Final	Nemo Rangers	1-03 - 0-12	Thomond College	Páirc Uí Chaoimh
	D Linehan 1-0, S Coughlan 0-2, J Barrett 0-1.		J Dunne 0-5, B Talty 0-3, M Kilcoyne 0-2, M Spillane 0-1, R Bell 0-1.

== Quarter-final ==
29 January 1978 Quarter-final	St John's	4-09 - 1-08	Kingdom	Corrigan Park

== Semi-finals ==
5 March 1978 Semi-final	Thomond College	1-12 - 1-08	St Mary's	Gaelic Grounds

5 March 1978 Semi-final	St John's	4-12 - 1-08	Summerhill	Corrigan Park

== Final ==
26 March 1978 Final	Thomond College	2-14 - 1-03	St John's	Croke Park

== Statistics ==
=== Miscellaneous ===
- St Mary's won the Connacht Club Championship title for the first time in their history. They were also the first team from Sligo to win the provincial title.
- Summerhill won the Leinster Club Championship for the first time in their history. They were also the first team from Meath to win the provincial title.
- St John's won the Ulster Club Championship for the first time in their history. They were also the first team from Antrim to win the provincial title.
