= 2010 Meath Senior Football Championship =

Meath S.F.C
- Season: 2010
- Champions: Skryne; 13th Senior Football Championship title
- Relegated: St Ultans
- Leinster SCFC: Skryne (semi finals); Rhode 2-11 Skryne 1-10
- All-Ireland SCFC: N/A
- Winning Captain: Aidan Tuite (Skryne)
- Man of the Match: Paddy O'Rourke (Skryne)
- Matches: 49

The 2010 Meath Senior Football Championship was the 118th edition of the Meath GAA's premier club Gaelic football tournament for senior graded teams in County Meath, Ireland. The tournament consists of 17 teams, with the winner going on to represent Meath in the Leinster Senior Club Football Championship. The championship starts with a group stage, and then progresses to a knock out stage.

Seneschalstown were the defending champions after they defeated Wolfe Tones, after a replay, in the previous year's final.

Oldcastle were promoted after claiming the 2009 Meath Intermediate Football Championship title, their first year in the senior grade since being relegated in 2002.

On 26 September 2010, Skryne claimed their 13th Senior Championship title when they defeated Seneschalstown 0-21 to 4-8 in a very entertaining final. The game looked like it would go to extra time, but with the last kick of the game, Skryne's Paddy O'Rourke scored a 45 and sealed the win for Skryne. Aidan Tuite, the Skryne captain, lifted the Keegan Cup while Paddy O'Rourke claimed the 'Man of the Match' award.

St. Ultan's were relegated after just 2 years as a senior club.

== Team changes ==
The following teams have changed division since the 2009 championship season:

=== To S.F.C. ===
Promoted from I.F.C.

- Oldcastle - (Intermediate Champions)

== Participating teams ==
The teams that took part in the 2010 Meath Senior Football Championship were:

Club	Location	2009 Championship Position	2010 Championship Position
Blackhall Gaels	Batterstown	Non Qualifier	Non Qualifier
Donaghmore/Ashbourne	Ashbourne	Non Qualifier	Quarter Finalist
Duleek/Bellewstown	Duleek	Relegation Play Off	Quarter Finalist
Dunshaughlin	Dunshaughlin	Quarter Finalist	Non Qualifier
Navan O'Mahonys	Navan	Semi Finalist	Non Qualifier
Oldcastle	Oldcastle	Intermediate Champions	Relegation Play Off
Rathkenny	Rathkenny	Relegation Play Off	Semi Finalist
Seneschalstown	Kentstown	Champions	Finalist
Simonstown Gaels	Navan	Non Qualifier	Relegation Play Off
Skryne	Skryne	Quarter Finalist	Champions
St Patricks	Stamullen	Quarter Finalist	Non Qualifier
St Peters Dunboyne	Dunboyne	Quarter Finalist	Semi Finalist
St Ultans	Bohermeen	Non Qualifier	Relegated to Intermediate
Summerhill	Summerhill	Semi Finalist	Non Qualifier
Trim	Trim	Non Qualifier	Non Qualifier
Walterstown	Navan	Relegation Play Off	Quarter Finalist
Wolfe Tones	Donaghpatrick	Finalist	Quarter Finalist

== Group stage ==
There are three groups called Group A, B and C. The three top finishers in Group A and B; and the first and second placed teams in Group C, qualify for the quarter-finals. The three teams that finish last in their groups go through to a round-robin relegation play off. The loser gets relegated to the Intermediate Division.

=== Group A ===
Team	Pld	W	L	D	PF	PA	PD	Pts
Rathkenny	5	4	0	1	47	42	+5	9
Walterstown	5	4	1	0	66	51	+15	8
Seneschalstown	5	3	2	0	61	59	+2	6
Blackhall Gaels	5	2	2	1	62	53	+9	5
Dunshaughlin	5	1	4	0	65	54	+11	2
St Ultans	5	0	5	0	45	86	-41	0

Round 1:

- Seneschalstown 3-12, 0-13 St. Ultan's, Pairc Tailteann, 17/4/2010,
- Walterstown 2-11, 2-10 Dunshaughlin, Pairc Tailteann, 18/4/2010,
- Rathkenny 0-9, 1-6 Blackhall Gaels, Pairc Tailteann, 18/4/2010,

Round 2:

- Blackhall Gaels 1-19, 0-9 St. Ultan's, Skryne, 28/4/2010,
- Seneschalstown 0-11, 1-7 Dunshaughlin, Ratoath, 1/5/2010,
- Rathkenny 0-10, 0-8 Walterstown, Pairc Tailteann, 2/5/2010,

Round 3:

- Blackhall Gaels 0-6, 1-9 Walterstown, Ashbourne, 28/5/2010,
- Dunshaughlin 3-12, 0-3 St. Ultan's, Pairc Tailteann, 28/5/2010,
- Rathkenny 0-9 , 0-8 Seneschalstown, Simonstown, 30/5/2010,

Round 4:

- Walterstown 2-8 , 1-9 St. Ultan's, Simonstown, 17/7/2010,
- Rathkenny 1-7, 1-6 Dunshaughlin, Pairc Tailteann, 18/7/2010,
- Blackhall Gaels 1-9, 2-8 Seneschalstown, Ashbourne, 18/7/2010

Round 5:

- Dunshaughlin 0-9, 1-10 Blackhall Gaels, Summerhill, 6/8/2010,
- Rathkenny 0-9, 0-8 St. Ultan's, Meath Hill, 8/8/2010,
- Walterstown 0-15, 0-7 Seneschalstown, Pairc Tailteann, 8/8/2010.

=== Group B ===
Team	Pld	W	L	D	PF	PA	PD	Pts
Wolfe Tones	5	3	1	1	67	55	+12	7
Skryne	5	3	1	1	75	66	+9	7
St. Peter's Dunboyne	5	3	2	0	73	72	+1	6
St Patricks	5	1	2	2	72	83	-11	4
Trim	5	1	3	1	63	72	-9	3
Simonstown Gaels	5	1	3	1	56	62	-6	3

- Simonstown Gaels finish bottom of Group B because of their head-to-head result against Trim

Round 1:

- Wolfe Tones 1-8, 1-10 St. Peter's Dunboyne, Skryne, 17/4/2010,
- Skryne 0-11, 1-8 Simonstown Gaels, Seneschalstown, 18/4/2010,
- St. Patrick's 4-6, 2-12 Trim, Walterstown, 18/4/2010,

Round 2:

- Simonstown Gaels 1-11, 2-13 St. Peter's Dunboyne, Skryne, 1/5/2010,
- Wolfe Tones 0-11, 1-3 Trim, Pairc Tailteann, 2/5/2010,
- Skryne 0-17, 1-6 St. Patrick's, Ashbourne, 2/5/2010,

Round 3:

- Skryne 1-6, 1-13 Wolfe Tones, Pairc Tailteann, 29/5/2010,
- Trim 1-8, 0-12 St. Peter's Dunboyne, Summerhill, 30/5/2010,
- Simonstown Gaels 0-15, 1-6 St. Patrick's, Donore, 30/5/2010,

Round 4:

- Skryne 2-16, 4-6 Trim, Dunsany, 18/7/2010,
- Simonstown Gaels 2-5, 1-10 Wolfe Tones, Pairc Tailteann, 18/7/2010,
- St. Patrick's 2-14, 2-11 St. Peter's Dunboyne, Ratoath, 18/7/2010,

Round 5:

- Skryne 2-10 , 2-6 St. Peters's Dunboyne, Waltertown, 8/8/2010,
- Simonstown Gaels 0-9, 1-7 Trim, Dunderry, 8/8/2010,
- St. Patrick's 2-10, 2-10 Wolfe Tones, Seneschalstown, 8/8/2010.

=== Group C ===
Team	Pld	W	L	D	PF	PA	PD	Pts
Donaghmore/Ashbourne	4	3	1	0	60	48	+12	6
Duleek/Bellewstown	4	2	1	1	49	46	+3	5
Navan O'Mahonys	4	2	2	0	52	44	-8	4
Summerhill	4	2	2	0	49	59	-10	4
Oldcastle	4	0	3	1	42	55	-13	1

Round 1:

- Oldcastle 0-10, 2-9 Navan O'Mahony's, Athboy, 18/4/2010,
- Summerhill 0-17, 2-6 Donaghmore/Ashbourne, Dunshaughlin, 18/4/2010,
- Duleek/Bellewstown - Bye,

Round 2:

- Duleek/Bellewstown 0-9, 1-9 Donaghmore/Ashbourne, Donore, 30/4/2010,
- Summerhill 1-4, 3-8 Navan O'Mahony's, Dunsany, 2/5/2010,
- Oldcastle - Bye,

Round 3:

- Duleek/Bellewstown 1-7, 1-7 Oldcastle, Pairc Tailteann, 30/5/2010,
- Navan O'Mahony's 1-7, 2-9 Donaghmore/Ashbourne, Pairc Tailteann, 30/5/2010,
- Summerhill - Bye,

Round 4:

- Oldcastle 0-12, 2-13 Donaghmore/Ashbourne, Pairc Tailteann, 16/7/2010,
- Summerhill 2-8, 1-15 Duleek/Bellewstown, Dunshaughlin, 18/7/2010,
- Navan O'Mahonys - Bye,

Round 5:

- Duleek/Bellewstown 1-9, 0-10 Navan O'Mahony's, Skryne, 8/8/2010,
- Oldcastle 0-10, 1-8 Summerhill, Pairc Tailteann, 8/8/2010,
- Donaghmore/Ashbourne - Bye,

== Knock-out Stage ==
=== Relegation Play Off ===
Team	Pld	W	L	D	PF	PA	PD	Pts
Oldcastle	1	1	0	0	19	9	+10	2
Simonstown Gaels	1	1	0	0	17	15	+2	2
St Ultans	2	0	0	2	24	36	-12	0

Game 1: St. Ultans 1-12, 0-17 Simonstown Gaels, Kilberry, 21/8/2010,

Game 2: St. Ultans 2-3, 2-13 Oldcastle, Ballinlough, 29/8/2010,

=== Finals ===
Quarter-Finals
Rathkenny	1-11 AET
Duleek/Bellewstown	0-11 AET
Seneschalstown	2-12
Wolfe Tones	2-7
Donaghmore/Ashbourne	1-8
Skryne	2-11
Walterstown	0-11
St. Peters Dunboyne	0-13

Semi-Finals
Rathkenny	0-8
Seneschalstown	0-10
Skryne	2-9
St. Peters Dunboyne	2-8

Final
Seneschalstown	4-8
Skryne	0-21

Quarter-Finals

- Donaghmore/Ashbourne 1-8, 2-11 Skryne, Pairc Tailteann, 21/8/2010,
- Rathkenny 1-11, 0-11 Duleek/Bellewstown, Pairc Tailteann, 22/8/2010, AET
- Seneschalstown 2-12, 2-7 Wolfe Tones, Pairc Tailteann, 22/8/2010,
- Walterstown 0-11, 0-13 St. Peter's Dunboyne, Ratoath, 22/8/2010,

Semi-Finals

- Rathkenny 0-8, 0-10 Seneschalstown, Pairc Tailteann, 12/9/2010,
- Skryne 2-9, 2-8 St. Peter's Dunboyne, Pairc Tailteann, 12/9/2010,

Final

- Seneschalstown 4-8, 0-21 Skryne, Pairc Tailteann, 26/9/2010,
