= 2011 Meath Senior Football Championship =

Premier club Gaelic football tournament

Meath S.F.C.
- Season: 2011
- Champions: Summerhill; 6th Senior Football Championship title
- Relegated: Trim
- Leinster SCFC: Summerhill; Summerhill 0-11 St Brigids 2-15
- All Ireland SCFC: N/A
- Winning Captain: Tony McDonnell (Summerhill)
- Man of the Match: Adrian Kenny (Summerhill)
- Matches: 50

The 2011 Meath Senior Football Championship is the 119th edition of the Meath GAA's premier club Gaelic football tournament for senior-graded teams in County Meath, Ireland. The tournament consists of 17 teams, with the winner going on to represent Meath in the Leinster Senior Club Football Championship. The championship starts with a group stage and then progresses to a knockout stage.

Skryne were the defending champions after they defeated Seneschalstown in the previous year's final.

Nobber were promoted after claiming the 2010 Meath Intermediate Football Championship title, their first year in the senior grade since being relegated in 1991 and only their 2nd ever period as a senior club.

On 16 October 2011, Summerhill claimed their 6th senior championship title when they defeated Dunshaughlin 0-14 to 1-9 after extra time in a replay. Tony McDonnell raised the Keegan Cup for the 'Hill while Adrian Kenny claimed the 'Man of the Match' award.

Trim were relegated after 62 years as a senior club. Skryne is the only club to have operated at the senior grade for longer.

== Team changes ==
The following teams have changed division since the 2010 championship season.

=== To S.F.C. ===
Promoted from I.F.C.

- Nobber - (Intermediate Champions)

=== From S.F.C. ===
Relegated to I.F.C.

- St. Ultan's

== Participating teams ==
The teams that took part in the 2011 Meath Senior Football Championship are:

Club	Location	2010 Championship Position	2011 Championship Position
Blackhall Gaels	Batterstown	Non Qualifier	Non Qualifier
Donaghmore/Ashbourne	Ashbourne	Quarter-finalist	Semi-finalist
Duleek/Bellewstown	Duleek	Quarter-finalist	Relegation Play Off
Dunshaughlin	Dunshaughlin	Non Qualifier	Finalist
Navan O'Mahonys	Navan	Non Qualifier	Quarter-finalist
Nobber	Nobber	Intermediate Champions	Relegation Play Off
Oldcastle	Oldcastle	Relegation Play Off	Non Qualifier
Rathkenny	Rathkenny	Semi-finalist	Non Qualifier
Seneschalstown	Kentstown	Finalist	Non Qualifier
Simonstown Gaels	Navan	Relegation Play Off	Quarter-finalist
Skryne	Skryne	Champions	Non Qualifier
St Patricks	Stamullen	Non Qualifier	Non Qualifier
St Peters Dunboyne	Dunboyne	Semi-finalist	Quarter-finalist
Summerhill	Summerhill	Non Qualifier	Champions
Trim	Trim	Non Qualifier	Relegated to Intermediate
Walterstown	Navan	Quarter-finalist	Quarter-finalist
Wolfe Tones	Kilberry	Quarter-finalist	Semi-finalist

== Group stage ==
There are 3 groups called Group A, B and C. The 3 top finishers in Group A and B and the top 2 finishers in Group C will qualify for the quarter-finals. The 3 teams that finish last in their groups will play in a round-robin relegation play off. The loser will be relegated to the Intermediate division.

=== Group A ===
Team	Pld	W	L	D	PF	PA	PD	Pts
Wolfe Tones	5	3	0	2	75	51	+24	8
Summerhill	5	3	2	0	62	50	+12	6
Simonstown Gaels	5	2	1	2	64	75	-11	6
Blackhall Gaels	5	1	1	2	73	60	+13	4
Oldcastle	5	0	2	3	57	65	-8	3
Trim	5	1	3	1	62	92	-30	3

Round 1:

- Trim 0-6, 3-14 Summerhill, Pairc Tailteann, 17/4/2011,
- Oldcastle 1-11, 2-10 Wolfe Tones, Pairc Tailteann, 17/4/2011,
- Simonstown Gaels 1-4, 3-18 Blackhall Gaels, Dunsany, 17/4/2011,

Round 2:

- Trim 1-11, 0-14 Oldcastle, Kilskyre, 30/4/2011,
- Summerhill 0-13, 0-11 Blackhall Gaels, Pairc Tailteann, 1/5/2011,
- Simonstown Gaels 2-7, 1-10 Wolfe Tones, Pairc Tailteann, 1/5/2011,

Round 3:

- Trim 2-11, 1-17 Simonstown Gaels, Skryne, 13/5/2011,
- Wolfe Tones 2-6, 1-9 Blackhall Gaels, Trim, 14/5/2011,
- Summerhill 0-14, 1-5 Oldcastle, Athboy, 15/5/2011,

Round 4:

- Summerhill 0-7, 0-13 Simonstown Gaels, Pairc Tailteann, 10/6/2011,
- Oldcastle 0-10, 0-10 Blackhall Gaels, Bohermeen, 11/6/2011,
- Trim 1-4, 1-19 Wolfe Tones, Dunderry, 12/6/2011,

Round 5:

- Trim 1-15, 1-10 Blackhall Gaels, Summerhill, 7/8/2011,
- Summerhill 0-5, 1-9 Wolfe Tones, Pairc Tailteann, 7/8/2011,
- Oldcastle 0-11, 1-8 Simonstown Gaels, Kells, 7/8/2011,

=== Group B ===
Team	Pld	W	L	D	PF	PA	PD	Pts
Navan O'Mahonys	5	4	1	0	75	44	+31	8
Donaghmore Ashbourne	5	3	2	0	65	60	+5	6
Dunshaughlin	5	3	2	0	55	64	-9	6
Rathkenny	5	2	3	0	54	57	-3	4
Seneschalstown	5	2	3	0	56	63	-7	4
Nobber	5	1	4	0	56	73	-17	2

Round 1:

- Dunshaughlin 1-10, 0-9 Seneschalstown, Pairc Tailteann, 15/4/2011,
- Donaghmore/Ashbourne 2-8, 2-9 Rathkenny, Pairc Tailteann, 16/4/2011,
- Navan O'Mahonys 2-10, 1-7 Nobber, Castletown, 17/4/2011,

Round 2:

- Rathkenny 1-5, 0-10 Seneschalstown, Pairc Tailteann, 30/4/2011,
- Dunshaughlin 1-12, 1-7 Nobber, Simonstown, 30/4/2011,
- Donaghmore/Ashbourne 0-9, 2-8 Navan O'Mahonys, Walterstown, 1/5/2011,

Round 3:

- Donaghmore/Ashbourne 0-14, 0-8 Dunshaughlin, Pairc Tailteann, 13/5/2011,
- Rathkenny 0-7, 0-14 Navan O'Mahonys, Seneschalstown, 15/5/2011,
- Nobber 2-12, 0-14 Seneschalstown, Rathkenny, 15/5/2011,

Round 4:

- Donaghmore/Ashbourne 0-12, 1-7 Nobber, Simonstown, 12/6/2011,
- Rathkenny 1-5, 0-11 Dunshaughlin, Pairc Tailteann, 12/6/2011,
- Navan O'Mahonys 1-5, 0-10 Seneschalstown, Pairc Tailteann, 12/6/2011,

Round 5:

- Donaghmore/Ashbourne 1-13, 0-13 Seneschalstown, Pairc Tailteann, 7/8/2011,
- Rathkenny 1-13, 0-8 Nobber, Kilmainhamwood, 7/8/2011,
- Navan O'Mahonys 3-14, 0-8 Dunshaughlin, Dunsany, 7/8/2011,

=== Group C ===
Team	Pld	W	L	D	PF	PA	PD	Pts
St Peters Dunboyne	4	3	1	0	44	46	-2	6
Walterstown	4	2	2	0	52	46	+6	4
St Patricks	4	2	2	0	54	49	+5	4
Skryne	4	2	2	0	51	48	+3	4
Duleek/Bellewstown	4	1	3	0	51	63	-12	2

Round 1:

- Duleek/Bellewstown 1-8, 1-9 St Peters Dunboyne, Ashbourne, 15/4/2011,
- Walterstown 0-11, 1-12 St Patricks, Donore, 17/4/2011,
- Skryne - Bye,

Round 2:

- Skryne 1-8, 2-8 St Patricks, Ashbourne, 29/4/2011,
- Walterstown 1-8, 1-10 St Peters Dunboyne, Ratoath, 30/4/2011,
- Duleek/Bellewstown - Bye,

Round 3:

- Skryne 1-16, 0-15 Duleek/Bellewstown, Pairc Tailteann, 15/5/2011,
- St Peters Dunboyne 0-12, 0-11 St Patricks, Pairc Tailteann, 15/5/2011,
- Walterstown - Bye,

Round 4:

- Duleek/Bellewstown 1-12, 1-11 St Patricks, Pairc Tailteann, 11/6/2011,
- Skryne 1-5, 0-12 Walterstown, Dunsany, 12/6/2011,
- St. Peter's Dunboyne - Bye,

Round 5:

- Skryne 0-13, 0-7 St Peters Dunboyne, Pairc Tailteann, 6/8/2011,
- Duleek/Bellewstown 0-10, 2-12 Walterstown, Dunshaughlin, 6/8/2011,
- St. Patrick's - Bye,

== Knock-out Stages ==
=== Relegation Play Off ===
Team	Pld	W	L	D	PF	PA	PD	Pts
Nobber	1	1	0	0	19	17	+2	2
Duleek/Bellewstown	1	1	0	0	15	14	+1	2
Trim	2	0	2	0	31	34	-3	0

Game 1: Trim 3-8, 1-16 Nobber, Bohermeen, 20/8/2011,

Game 2: Duleek/Bellewstown 2-9, 1-11 Trim, Pairc Tailteann, 9/9/2011,

- If necessary, all matches will have extra time.

=== Finals ===
Quarter-finals
Simonstown Gaels	1-12
Dunshaughlin	0-16
St Peters Dunboyne	2-6
Donaghmore Ashbourne	3-14
Summerhill	2-10
Navan O'Mahonys	0-12
Wolfe Tones	3-14
Walterstown	0-9

Semi-finals
Dunshaughlin	1-9
Donaghmore Ashbourne	1-8
Summerhill	1-7
Wolfe Tones	0-6

Final
Dunshaughlin	1-9 AET
Summerhill	0-14 AET

Quarter-finals:

- Simonstown Gaels 1-12, 0-16 Dunshaughlin, Pairc Tailteann, 20/8/2011,
- St Peters Dunboyne 2-6, 3-14 Donaghmore Ashbourne, Pairc Tailteann, 21/8/2011,
- Summerhill 2-10 ,0-12 Navan O'Mahonys, Pairc Tailteann, 21/8/2011,
- Wolfe Tones 3-14, 0-9 Walterstown, Pairc Tailteann, 21/8/2011,

Semi-finals:

- Dunshaughlin 1-9 , 1-8 Donaghmore Ashbourne, Pairc Tailteann, 11/9/2011,
- Summerhill 1-7 , 0-6 Wolfe Tones, Pairc Tailteann, 11/9/2011,

Final:

- Dunshaughlin 0-10, 0-10 Summerhill, Pairc Tailteann, 2/10/2011,

Final Replay:

- Dunshaughlin 1-9, 0-14 Summerhill, Pairc Tailteann, 16/10/2011. A.E.T.
