= 1974 Meath Intermediate Football Championship =

Meath I.F.C.
- Season: 1974
- Champions: St. John's; 1st Intermediate Football Championship title
- Relegated: Boardsmill; Drumree; Enfield; Kilallon

The 1974 Meath Intermediate Football Championship is the 48th edition of the Meath GAA's premier club Gaelic football tournament for intermediate graded teams in County Meath, Ireland. The tournament consists of 22 teams. The championship starts with a group stage and then progresses to a knock out stage.

Ballinlough returned to the middle grade for the first time in 19 years since relegation from the S.F.C. the previous year.

Kilcloon and Gibbstown were promoted after claiming the 1973 Meath Junior Football Championship title and runners-up spot respectively.

On 13 October 1974, St. John's claimed their 1st Intermediate championship title when they defeated St. Vincent's 2–3 to 0–5 in the final in Pairc Tailteann, and thus entered the top flight of Meath club football for the first time as the Wolfe Tones (they amalgamated with neighbours Gibbstown for the 1975 season).

Boardsmill, Enfield and Killalon were relegated to the 1975 J.F.C. while Drumree opted to be regraded to the 1975 J.B.F.C. (or Division II as it was known at the time)

== Team changes ==
The following teams have changed division since the 1973 championship season.

=== From I.F.C. ===
Promoted to S.F.C.

- Bohermeen - (Intermediate Champions)

Relegated to 1974 J.A.F.C.

- Ratoath
- St. Peter's Dunboyne

Dissolved:

- Flathouse - After a ban on participation was imposed on Flathouse by the County Board for 5 years the club dissolved. St. Paul's Clonee was formed in 1974 as the daughter club of Flathouse.

=== To I.F.C. ===
Regraded from S.F.C.

- Ballinlough

Promoted from 1973 J.A.F.C.

- Kilcloon - (Junior 'A' Champions)
- Gibbstown - (Junior Runners-Up)

== Group stage ==
There are 4 groups called Group A, B, C and D. The top two finishers in each group will qualify for the quarter-finals.

=== Group A ===
Team	Pld	W	L	D	PF	PA	PD	Pts
St. John's	5	0	0	0	0	0	+0	10
Oldcastle	5	4	1	0	0	0	+0	8
Moylagh	5	3	2	0	0	0	+0	6
St. Mary's	5	2	3	0	0	0	+0	4
Ballinlough	5	1	4	0	0	0	+0	2
Kilmainhamwood	5	0	5	0	0	0	+0	0

Round 1:

- St. John's 1-10, 0-4 St. Mary's, Seneschalstown, 7/4/1974,
- Moylagh 2-4, 1-3 Kilmainhamwood, Kells, 7/4/1974,
- Oldcastle 1-9, 0-7 Ballinlough, Martry, 7/4/1974,

Round 2:

- St. John's 1-8, 0-10 Moylagh, Kells, 28/4/1974,
- Oldcastle 1-11, 0-5 Kilmainhamwood, Kells, 5/5/1974,
- St. Mary's 0-13, 0-12 Ballinlough, Martry, 19/5/1974,

Round 3:

- St. John's 3-7, 1-6 Oldcastle, Kells, 19/5/1974,
- Ballinlough 3-8, 2-8 Kilmainhamwood, Kells, 26/5/1974,
- Moylagh 1-10, 1-8 St. Mary's, Kilberry, 16/6/1974,

Round 4:

- St. John's 1-9, 0-7 Ballinlough, Martry, 16/6/1974,
- St. Mary's w, l Kilmainhamwood, Castletown, 7/7/1974,
- Oldcastle 1-7, 0-5 Moylagh, Kilskyre, 14/7/1974,

Round 5:

- St. John's w/o, scr Kilmainhamwood, Kells, 14/7/1974,
- Oldcastle 4-18, 2-6 St. Mary's, Pairc Tailteann, 21/7/1974,
- Moylagh 2-9, 2-5 Ballinlough, Kells, 21/7/1974,

=== Group B ===
Team	Pld	W	L	D	PF	PA	PD	Pts
Dunshaughlin	5	4	1	0	0	0	+0	8
St. Brigid's Ballinacree	5	3	1	1	0	0	+0	7
Dunsany	5	3	1	1	0	0	+0	7
Enfield	5	3	2	0	0	0	+0	6
Gibbstown	5	1	4	0	0	0	+0	2
Ballinabrackey	5	0	5	0	0	0	+0	0

Round 1:

- Dunshaughlin 2-11, 2-7 Enfield, Kilskyre, 7/4/1974,
- Gibbstown 2-5, 1-7 Ballinabrackey, Kildalkey, 7/4/1974,
- St. Brigid's 1–9, 0-12 Dunsany, Athboy, 7/4/1974,

Round 2:

- St. Brigid's 3-8, 2-6 Dunshaughlin, Martry, 19/5/1974,
- Dunsany 2-12, 2-3 Ballinabrackey, Summerhill, 19/5/1974,
- Enfield 2-9, 1-5 Gibbstown, Trim, 19/5/1974,

Round 3:

- Dunshaughlin 0-7, 0-5 Dunsany, Kilmessan, 26/5/1974,
- St. Brigid's 3-7, 3-6 Gibbstown, Kilskyre, 26/5/1974,
- Enfield w/o, scr Ballinabrackey,

Round 4:

- St. Brigid's 3–12, 2-10 Enfield, Athboy, 16/6/1974, *
- Dunsany w, l Gibbstown, Skryne, 14/7/1974,
- Dunshaughlin w/o, scr Ballinabrackey,

Round 5:

- Dunshaughlin w, l Gibbstown, Kilmessan, 4/8/1974,
- Dunsany 1-9, 0-9 Enfield, Trim, 11/8/1974,
- St. Brigid's w/o, scr Ballinabrackey,

Quarter-final Playoff:

- St. Brigid's 0-10, 0-8 Dunsany, Kilberry, 1/9/1974,

- Although St. Brigid's won their Round 4 match against Enfield, the points were awarded to Enfield due to Leinster Council ruling on 14 August that St. Brigid's had fielded an unregistered player during the match.

=== Group C ===
Team	Pld	W	L	D	PF	PA	PD	Pts
Castletown	4	4	0	0	0	0	+0	8
Donaghmore	4	2	1	1	0	0	+0	5
Martinstown	4	2	2	0	0	0	+0	4
Drumree	4	0	2	2	0	0	+0	2
Kilcloon	4	0	3	1	0	0	+0	1

Round 1:

- Donaghmore 2-5, 0-8 Martinstown, Dunshaughlin, 7/4/1974,
- Castletown 2-11, 0-1 Drumree, Athboy, 7/4/1974,
- Kilcloon - Bye,

Round 2:

- Martinstown 2-6, 1-2 Kilcloon, Kilmessan, 19/5/1974,
- Donaghmore 1–12, 1-12 Drumree, Dunshaughlin, 19/5/1974,
- Castletown - Bye,

Round 3:

- Castletown 2-5, 2-4 Donaghmore, Kilberry, 2/6/1974,
- Kilcloon 3–10, 3-10 Drumree, Summerhill, 2/6/1974,
- Martinstown - Bye,

Round 4:

- Donaghmore 2-7, 1-7 Kilcloon, Dunshaughlin, 16/6/1974,
- Castletown 3-9, 2-8 Martinstown, Martry, 16/6/1974,
- Drumree - Bye,

Round 5:

- Castletown w, l Kilcloon, Kilberry, 14/7/1974,
- Martinstown w, l Drumree,
- Donaghmore - Bye,

=== Group D ===
Team	Pld	W	L	D	PF	PA	PD	Pts
St. Vincent's	4	4	0	0	0	0	+0	8
Rathkenny	4	3	1	0	0	0	+0	6
Martry	4	2	2	0	0	0	+0	4
Kilallon	4	1	3	0	0	0	+0	2
Boardsmill	4	0	4	0	0	0	+0	0

Round 1:

- Rathkenny w, l Kilallon, Martry, 7/4/1974,
- Martry 1-13, 0-6 Boardsmill, Kildalkey, 7/4/1974,
- St. Vincent's - Bye,

Round 2:

- St. Vincent's 2-15, 0-8 Kilallon, Kilberry, 28/4/1974,
- Rathkenny 1-6, 1-5 Martry, Kilberry, 12/5/1974,
- Boardsmill - Bye,

Round 3:

- St. Vincent's 0-11, 1-6 Martry, Skryne, 19/5/1974,
- Rathkenny 3-14, 0-7 Boardsmill, Athboy, 16/6/1974,
- Kilallon - Bye,

Round 4:

- St. Vincent's 1-2, 0-4 Rathkenny, Duleek, 23/6/1974,
- Kilallon w, l Boardsmill, Ballivor, 14/7/1974,
- Martry - Bye,

Round 5:

- Martry w, l Kilallon, Kilskyre, 21/7/1974,
- St. Vincent's w/o, scr Boardsmill, Dunshaughlin, 11/8/1974,
- Rathkenny - Bye,

== Knock-out Stages ==
The teams in the quarter-finals are the first and second placed teams from each group.

Quarter-Finals
St. John's	0-10
St. Brigid's Ballinacree	2-3
Dunshaughlin	0-6 (R)
Rathkenny	0-8 (R)
Castletown	0-8
Oldcastle	1-4
St. Vincent's	0-6
Donaghmore	0-5

Semi-Finals
St. John's	0-6
Rathkenny	0-3
Castletown	2-9
St. Vincent's	4-4

Final
St. John's	2-3
St. Vincent's	0-5

Quarter-final:

- Castletown 0-8, 1-4 Oldcastle, Kells, 18/8/1974,
- St. Vincent's 0-6, 0-5 Donaghmore, Skryne, 25/8/1974
- Rathkenny 0–8, 1-5 Dunshaughlin, Skryne, 25/8/1974,
- St. John's 0-10, 2-3 St. Brigid's, Kells, 15/9/1974,
- Rathkenny 0-8, 0-6 Dunshaughlin, Pairc Tailteann, 15/9/1974,

Semi-final:

- St. John's 0-6, 0-3 Rathkenny, Kells, 29/9/1974,
- St. Vincent's 4-4, 2-9 Castletown, Pairc Tailteann, 29/9/1974,

Final:

- St. John's 2-3, 0-5 St. Vincent's, Pairc Tailteann, 13/10/1974,
