= Shane O'Rourke =

Irish Gaelic footballer

Personal information
- Native name: Shane Ó Rúairc (Irish)
- Born: 3 May 1988 (age 38) Navan, Ireland
- Occupation: P.E. teacher

Sport
- Sport: Gaelic football
- Position: Centre Forward
Club
- Years: Club
- 2005-2019: Simonstown Gaels
Club titles
- Meath titles: 1
Inter-county
- Years: County
- 2007-2015: Meath
Inter-county titles
- Leinster titles: 1

Shane O'Rourke (born 3 May 1988) is a former Gaelic footballer who played for the Simonstown Gaels club and for the Meath county team. He is the son of Meath footballer Colm O'Rourke and a cousin of former Meath goalkeeper Paddy O'Rourke.

Shane O'Rourke was linked to a move to the Brisbane Lions, Queensland to play in the Australian Football League championship but he was not believed to be interested in the move.

O'Rourke has won a Hogan Cup medal and also captained his side to the All-Ireland Colleges final in 2006; however, they lost the final to Abbey C.B.S. As of 2015, he was teaching physical education at St Patrick's Classical School, of which his father Colm is principal.

== Honours ==
- Meath Senior Football Championship (2): 2016, 2017
- Leinster Senior Football Championship (1): 2010
- Hogan Cup (1): 2004
- Leinster Colleges Senior Football Championship (2): 2004, 2006
- Leinster Minor Football Championship (1): 2006
- Meath Footballer of the Year (1): 2016
