= Paddy O'Rourke (Meath footballer) =

Irish Gaelic footballer

Personal information
- Native name: Pádraig Ó Rúairc (Irish)
- Born: 10 May 1989 (age 37) Skryne, Ireland
- Height: 1.95 m (6 ft 5 in)

Sport
- Sport: Gaelic Football
- Position: Goalkeeper
Club
- Years: Club
- 2007-: Skryne
Club titles
- Meath titles: 1
Inter-county
- Years: County
- 2009-2017: Meath
Inter-county titles
- Leinster titles: 1

Paddy O'Rourke (born 10 May 1989) is an Irish Gaelic footballer who plays as a goalkeeper for his club Skryne and, formerly, the Meath county team. O'Rourke is the nephew of former Skryne and Meath player Colm and first cousin of former Meath player Shane.

== Playing career ==
=== Club ===
He played for the Skryne juvenile team at a young age and eventually became the Skryne senior team's first choice goalkeeper, aged 16. He subsequently moved outfield to a forward position. O'Rourke was top scorer on the 2010 SFC Skryne winning team.

An outfield player at club level, O'Rourke has also played club football in Australia.

=== Inter-county ===
O'Rourke played for the Meath U21 football team up until 2010. He made his debut for the Meath senior team starting as a goalkeeper in a Leinster Quarter-finals game against Dublin on 7 June 2009. In 2010 O'Rourke was the starting goalkeeper for Meath, but was replaced by Trim's Brendan Murphy during the re-played Leinster Senior Football Championship game against Laois. O'Rourke played as a forward briefly for his county until 2013 when David Gallagher retired.

He then abruptly retired, bemoaning his lack of silverware with Meath:

"From 2011 to now, the commitment levels have gone through the roof but we've had nothing to show for it. Our seasons have been over by early to mid-July. Last year we lost to Kildare, which suggests we're slipping in the province, while Dublin are well out in front, and then this new Super 8 won't help any team outside the elite. So I finally came to a decision: this is not worth it. Because when you think of the consequences of the incredible commitment levels required, you're losing so much of your life. Never mind the amount of evenings you're spending training and at the gym, it means you end up isolated from your family, your friends and your club. And for what? How can you justify training five or six nights per week for eight or nine months of the year, without a realistic chance of winning anything? I just can't do it any more".

Within two years Meath had qualified for the Super 8.

=== International rules ===
He played twice as goalkeeper for Ireland against Australia in the 2013 International Rules Series. He again played in goals for Ireland in the November 2014 International Rules Match played in Perth, Australia

== Honours ==
Meath

- Leinster Senior Football Championship: 2010

Ireland

- International Rules Series: 2013
