= Ciarán Lenehan =

Irish Gaelic footballer

Personal information
- Native name: Ciarán Ó Leannacháin (Irish)
- Born: Skryne, County Meath
- Occupation: Student

Sport
- Position: Left-Half-back
Club
- Years: Club
- 2008-: Skryne
Club titles
- Meath titles: 1
- Leinster titles: 0
- All-Ireland Titles: 0
Inter-county
- Years: County
- 2011-2013: Meath
Inter-county titles
- Leinster titles: 1

Ciarán Lenehan is an Irish Gaelic footballer who currently plays for Meath Senior Football Championship club Skryne and the Meath county team. Lenehan made his senior inter-county debut against Kildare in the Leinster Senior Football Championship quarter-final.

== Honours ==
- Meath Senior Football Championship: 1
  - 2010
- Lenister Minor Football Championship:1
  - 2008
