= Thomond College of Education, Limerick =

- Coláiste Oideachais Thuamhurnhan, Luimneach
- Active: 1973–1991
- Affiliations: NUI; University of Limerick
- Location: Limerick, Ireland
- Campus: Urban
- Nickname: Thomond
- Website: University of Limerick, Physical Education Dept.

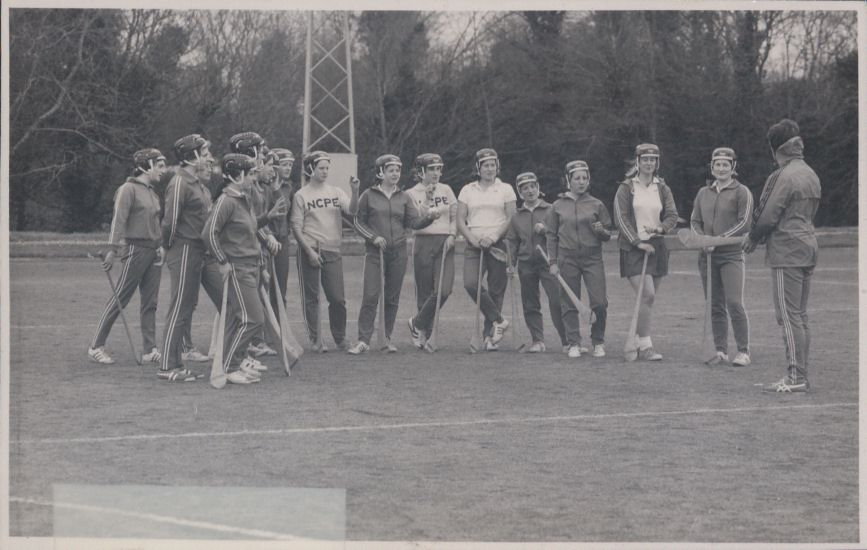
TCPE students playing camogie, c. 1976

Thomond College of Education, Limerick (Coláiste Oideachais Thuamhurnhan, Luimneach in Irish) was established in 1973 in Limerick, Ireland as the National College of Physical Education to train physical education teachers. The college was renamed to Thomond College of Education in 1975 when subjects other than physical education were added. These included metalwork, rural science, and woodwork.

The college was located on the same campus as National Institute for Higher Education, Limerick (now University of Limerick) in Plassey, Limerick on a separate site purchased in 1971 for the college.

During 1976 and 1977 the college was a recognised college of the National University of Ireland. After this the college was accredited by the National Council for Educational Awards for the remainder of its existence.

The college was placed on a statutory basis in 1980.

In 1991 the college was dissolved and integrated into the University of Limerick, primarily into the Physical Education and Sports Science at the university.
