= 1975 Meath Senior Football Championship =

Meath S.F.C.
- Season: 1975
- Champions: Summerhill; 2nd Senior Championship Title
- Relegated: Duleek
- Leinster SCFC: Summerhill (preliminary round) St. Mary's Ardee w, l Summerhill
- All Ireland SCFC: n/a
- Winning Captain: Donie Mooney (Summerhill)
- Matches: 40

The 1975 Meath Senior Football Championship is the 83rd edition of the Meath GAA's premier club Gaelic football tournament for senior graded teams in County Meath, Ireland. The tournament consists of 15 teams, with the winner going on to represent Meath in the Leinster Senior Club Football Championship. The championship starts with a group stage and then progresses to a knock out stage.

This season saw the formation of two new clubs in the senior grade. Last years finalists Bohermeen and Intermediate side Martry joined forces under the name Martry Harps. In February 1975, the 1974 I.F.C. champions St. John's Kilberry (who were only in existence for 2 years since forming in early 1973 from the Garryowen and Kilberry clubs) amalgamated with fellow Intermediate side Gibbstown to be known as the Wolfe Tones.

Summerhill were the defending champions after they defeated Bohermeen in the previous years final and they completed a 2 in a row of titles when beating Navan O'Mahonys 0-10 to 0-9 in the final in Pairc Tailteann on 5 October 1975. Donie Mooney raised the Keegan Cup for the 'Hill.

== Team changes ==
The following teams have changed division since the 1974 championship season.

=== To S.F.C. ===
Promoted from I.F.C.

- St. John's (Intermediate Champions) & Gibbstown (amalgamated as the Wolfe Tones).
- Martry (amalgamated with 1974 S.F.C. finalists Bohermeen as Martry Harps).

=== From S.F.C. ===
Regraded to I.F.C.

- Slane

== Group stage ==
=== Group A ===
Team	Pld	W	L	D	PF	PA	PD	Pts
Martry Harps	7	6	0	1	0	0	+0	13
Seneschalstown	7	5	0	2	0	0	+0	12
Skryne	7	3	1	3	0	0	+0	9
Kilbride	7	3	2	2	0	0	+0	8
Walterstown	7	3	4	0	0	0	+0	6
St. Patrick's	7	2	3	2	0	0	+0	6
Ballivor	7	1	6	0	0	0	+0	2
Dunderry	7	0	7	0	0	0	+0	0

Round 1

- Martry Harps 2-6, 0-4 Skryne, Pairc Tailteann, 31/3/1975,
- Walterstown 1-11, 2-5 Dunderry, Kilmessan, 6/4/1975,
- Seneschalstown 2-7, 2-3 Ballivor, Trim, 6/4/1975,
- Kilbride 0-6, 1-3 St. Patrick's, Duleek, 6/4/1975,

Round 2

- Seneschalstown 3-6, 0-8 Walterstown, Skryne, 4/5/1975,
- Martry Harps 1-8, 1-4 St. Patrick's, Duleek, 4/5/1975,
- Skryne 1-10, 2-7 Kilbride, Pairc Tailteann, 11/5/1975,
- Ballivor w, l Dunderry, Trim, 11/5/1975,

Round 3

- Skryne 0-10, 0-10 St. Patrick's, Pairc Tailteann, 25/5/1975,
- Martry Harps 1-10, 1-6 Kilbride, Pairc Tailteann, 8/6/1975,
- Walterstown 2-5, 0-7 Ballivor, Trim, 8/6/1975,
- Seneschalstown 0-14, 0-12 Dunderry, Martry, 15/6/1975,

Round 4

- Skryne 2-9, 3-5 Dunderry, Martry, 13/7/1975,
- Martry Harps 1-5, 0-8 Seneschalstown, Kilberry, 13/7/1975,
- Kilbride w, l Walterstown, Duleek, 13/7/1975,
- St. Patrick's 1-12, 1-2 Ballivor, Pairc Tailteann, 20/7/1975,

Round 5

- Martry Harps 2-10, 2-5 Walterstown, Pairc Tailteann, 20/7/1975,
- Kilbride 2-4, 0-9 Dunderry, Dunshaughlin, 20/7/1975,
- Seneschalstown 3-12, 0-4 St. Patrick's, Duleek, 27/7/1975,
- Skryne w, l Ballivor,

Round 6:

- Seneschalstown 1-6, 2-3 Skryne, Pairc Tailteann, 17/8/1975,
- Martry Harps 1-7, 0-6 Dunderry, Pairc Tailteann, 17/8/1975,
- Walterstown 1-11, 2-3 St. Patrick's, Duleek, 17/8/1975,
- Kilbride 4-9, 1-11 Ballivor, Dunshaughlin, 17/8/1975,

Round 7:

- Seneschalstown 4-9, 2-7 Kilbride, Pairc Tailteann, 31/8/1975,
- Skryne w, l Walterstown,
- St. Patrick's w, l Dunderry,
- Martry Harps w, l Ballivor,

=== Group B ===
Team	Pld	W	L	D	PF	PA	PD	Pts
Summerhill	6	5	1	0	0	0	+0	10
Navan O'Mahonys	6	5	1	0	0	0	+0	10
Wolfe Tones	6	3	1	2	0	0	+0	8
Syddan	6	2	3	1	0	0	+0	5
Duleek	6	2	4	0	0	0	+0	4
Gaeil Colmcille	6	1	4	1	0	0	+0	3
Trim	6	1	5	0	0	0	+0	2

Round 1:

- Wolfe Tones 1-7, 0-9 Summerhill, Skryne, 6/4/1975,
- Navan O'Mahonys 0-9, 0-5 Trim, Dunshaughlin, 6/4/1975,
- Syddan 2-7, 1-6 Gaeil Colmcille, Kilberry, 6/4/1975,
- Duleek - Bye,

Round 2:

- Gaeil Colmcille 1-6, 1-3 Duleek, Seneschalstown, 20/4/1975,
- Wolfe Tones 1-4, 1-3 Trim, Pairc Tailteann, 11/5/1975,
- Summerhill w, l Navan O'Mahonys, Dunshaughlin, 11/5/1975,
- Syddan - Bye,

Round 3:

- Duleek 3-11, 2-6 Syddan, Pairc Tailteann, 4/5/1975,
- Summerhill 3-7, 2-0 Trim, Dunshaughlin, 25/5/1975,
- Navan O'Mahonys 3-10, 2-2 Wolfe Tones, Kells, 8/6/1975,
- Gaeil Colmcille - Bye,

Round 4:

- Summerhill 3-11, 3-4 Duleek, Dunshaughlin, 8/6/1975,
- Navan O'Mahonys w, l Syddan, Kilberry, 15/6/1975,
- Wolfe Tones 0-8, 0-8 Gaeil Colmcille, Martry, 13/7/1975,
- Trim - Bye,

Round 5:

- Summerhill 0-11, 0-8 Syddan, Kilberry, 13/7/1975,
- Wolfe Tones 2-8, 2-5 Duleek, Seneschalstown, 20/7/1975,
- Trim w, l Gaeil Colmcille, Martry, 20/7/1975,
- Navan O'Mahonys - Bye,

Round 6:

- Navan O'Mahonys 0-9, 0-3 Gaeil Colmcille, Kilberry, 27/7/1975,
- Wolfe Tones 2-6, 1-9 Syddan, Castletown, 17/8/1975,
- Duleek w, l Trim,
- Summerhill - Bye,

Round 7:

- Navan O'Mahonys 2-11, 0-5 Duleek, Seneschalstown, 17/8/1975,
- Summerhill 2-14, 0-2 Gaeil Colmcille, Athboy, 17/8/1975,
- Syddan w, l Trim,
- Wolfe Tones - Bye,

== Knock-out Stages ==
The winners and runners up of each group qualify for the semi-finals.

Semi-finals
1	Martry Harps	0-10
4	Navan O'Mahonys	1-8
3	Summerhill	2-5
2	Seneschalstown	0-4

Final
Navan O'Mahonys	0-9
Summerhill	0-10

Semi-finals:

- Summerhill 2-5, 0-4 Seneschalstown, Pairc Tailteann, 14/9/1975,
- Navan O'Mahonys 1-8, 0-10 Martry Harps, Kells, 21/9/1975,

Final:

- Summerhill 0-10, 0-9 Navan O'Mahonys, Pairc Tailteann, 5/10/1975,

== Leinster Senior Club Football Championship ==
Preliminary round:

- St. Mary's Ardee w, l Summerhill, ???, 2/11/1975,
