= 1976 Meath Senior Football Championship =

Meath S.F.C.
- Season: 1976
- Champions: Summerhill; 3rd Senior Championship Title
- Relegated: Duleek
- Leinster SCFC: Summerhill (Quarter-final) Raheens 1-8, 1-4 Summerhill
- All Ireland SCFC: n/a
- Winning Captain: Mattie Kerrigan (Summerhill)
- Matches: 40

The 1976 Meath Senior Football Championship is the 84th edition of the Meath GAA's premier club Gaelic football tournament for senior graded teams in County Meath, Ireland. The tournament consists of 16 teams, with the winner going on to represent Meath in the Leinster Senior Club Football Championship. The championship starts with a group stage and then progresses to a knock out stage.

Summerhill were the defending champions after they defeated Navan O'Mahonys in the previous years final and they completed a 3 in a row of titles when beating Walterstown 3-9 to 0-2 in the final in Pairc Tailteann on 19 September 1976. Mattie Kerrigan raised the Keegan Cup for the 'Hill.

This was Moylagh's debut in the senior grade after claiming the 1975 Meath Intermediate Football Championship title.

Duleek were regraded to the 1977 I.F.C. at the end of the campaign after 10 years as a senior club.

== Team changes ==
The following teams have changed division since the 1975 championship season.

=== To S.F.C. ===
Promoted from I.F.C.

- Moylagh - (Intermediate Champions)

=== From S.F.C. ===
Regraded to I.F.C.

- None

== Group stage ==
=== Group A ===
Team	Pld	W	L	D	PF	PA	PD	Pts
Martry Harps	7	6	1	0	0	0	+0	12
Navan O'Mahonys	7	5	2	0	0	0	+0	10
St. Patrick's	7	5	2	0	0	0	+0	10
Moylagh	7	5	2	0	0	0	+0	10
Ballivor	7	3	3	1	0	0	+0	7
Wolfe Tones	7	2	5	0	0	0	+0	4
Syddan	7	1	5	1	0	0	+0	3
Duleek	7	0	7	0	0	0	+0	0

Round 1

- Ballivor 3-11, 4-7 Navan O'Mahonys, Trim, 28/3/1976,
- Martry Harps 1-8, 0-2 Moylagh, Kells, 28/3/1976,
- Wolfe Tones 1-5, 1-3 Syddan, Duleek, 28/3/1976,
- St. Patrick's 1-13, 1-5 Duleek, Pairc Tailteann, 28/3/1976,

Round 2

- Navan O'Mahonys w, l Syddan, Kilberry, 11/4/1976,
- Martry Harps 2-8, 1-5 St. Patrick's, Duleek, 11/4/1976,
- Ballivor 4-11, 0-0 Wolfe Tones, Trim, 11/4/1976,
- Moylagh 3-12, 0-10 Duleek, ???, 11/4/1976,

Round 3

- Navan O'Mahonys w, l Wolfe Tones, Seneschalstown, 25/4/1976,
- Martry Harps 3-17, 0-2 Duleek, Pairc Tailteann, 25/4/1976,
- St. Patrick's 5-6, 1-11 Moylagh, Kilberry, 25/4/1976,
- Ballivor 1-7, 1-7 Syddan, Kilmessan, 25/4/1976,

Round 4

- Moylagh 4-18, 1-9 Navan O'Mahonys, Kilskyre, 23/5/1976,
- Ballivor 3-13, 2-5 Duleek, Pairc Tailteann, 23/5/1976,
- Martry Harps 2-9, 1-2 Wolfe Tones, Pairc Tailteann, 27/6/1976,
- St. Patrick's w, l Syddan,

Round 5

- Navan O'Mahonys w, l St. Patrick's, Seneschalstown, 13/6/1976,
- Moylagh 1-8, 1-7 Ballivor, Kells, 13/6/1976,
- Martry Harps 0-11, 2-3 Syddan, Kilberry, 20/6/1976,
- Wolfe Tones w/o, scr Duleek,

Round 6:

- Moylagh 3-18, 0-0 Wolfe Tones, Seneschalstown, 11/7/1976,
- St. Patrick's w, l Ballivor, Dunshaughlin, 11/7/1976,
- Navan O'Mahonys 1-9, 0-3 Martry Harps, Seneschalstown, 11/7/1976,
- Syddan w/o, scr Duleek,

Round 7:

- Moylagh 2-14, 0-4 Syddan, Kells, 8/8/1976,
- St. Patrick's w/o, scr Wolfe Tones, Seneschalstown, 8/8/1976,
- Martry Harps w/o, scr Ballivor, Trim, 8/8/1976,
- Navan O'Mahonys w/o, scr Duleek,

Semi-final playoffs:

- Navan O'Mahonys 1-10, 0-10 Moylagh, Ballinlough, 15/8/1976,
- St. Patrick's w, l Moylagh, Skryne, 22/8/1976,
- Navan O'Mahonys w, l St. Patrick's, Skryne, 29/8/1976,

=== Group B ===
Team	Pld	W	L	D	PF	PA	PD	Pts
Walterstown	7	6	0	1	0	0	+0	13
Summerhill	7	6	1	0	0	0	+0	12
Seneschalstown	7	4	2	1	0	0	+0	9
Trim	7	4	3	0	0	0	+0	8
Skryne	7	4	3	0	0	0	+0	8
Kilbride	7	2	5	0	0	0	+0	4
Dunderry	7	1	6	0	0	0	+0	2
Gaeil Colmcille	7	0	7	0	0	0	+0	0

Round 1

- Walterstown 2-12, 2-5 Kilbride, Kilmessan, 28/3/1976,
- Summerhill 0-11, 0-10 Skryne, Trim, 28/3/1976,
- Dunderry 0-6, 0-5 Gaeil Colmcille, Martry, 28/3/1976,
- Seneschalstown 0-9, 0-6 Trim, Pairc Tailteann, 28/3/1976,

Round 2

- Walterstown 2-2, 1-4 Skryne, Pairc Tailteann, 11/4/1976,
- Summerhill 4-11, 1-5 Kilbride, Dunshaughlin, 11/4/1976,
- Trim 0-8, 0-7 Gaeil Colmcille, Athboy, 11/4/1976,
- Seneschalstown 1-6, 0-6 Dunderry, Pairc Tailteann, 11/4/1976,

Round 3

- Walterstown 1-11, 2-7 Summerhill, Pairc Tailteann, 25/4/1976,
- Seneschalstown w, l Gaeil Colmcille, Kilberry, 25/4/1967,
- Skryne 1-12, 0-8 Kilbride, Kilmessan, 25/4/1967,
- Trim 3-11, 1-10 Dunderry, Kildalkey, 25/4/1967,

Round 4

- Skryne 2-13, 1-6 Dunderry, Dunshaughlin, 16/5/1976,
- Seneschalstown 0-10, 0-5 Kilbride, Dunshaughlin, 23/5/1976,
- Walterstown 1-6, 0-3 Gaeil Colmcille, Pairc Tailteann, 23/5/1976,
- Summerhill 2-11, 2-10 Trim, Kildalkey, 27/6/1976,

Round 5

- Trim 1-9, 2-5 Kilbride, Dunshaughlin, 13/6/1976,
- Skryne 3-6, 0-5 Seneschalstown, Pairc Tailteann, 13/6/1976,
- Summerhill 3-6, 0-7 Gaeil Colmcille, Athboy, 13/6/1976,
- Walterstown 2-16, 0-2 Dunderry, Dunshaughlin, 20/6/1976,

Round 6:

- Kilbride 0-10, 0-6 Gaeil Colmcille, Trim, 11/7/1976,
- Summerhill 2-14, 0-2 Dunderry, Dunshaughlin, 11/7/1976,
- Trim 4-8, 1-10 Skryne, Pairc Tailteann, 11/7/1976,
- Walterstown 2-6, 1-9 Seneschalstown, Pairc Tailteann, 11/7/1976,

Round 7:

- Walterstown 1-10, 0-11 Trim, Pairc Tailteann, 8/8/1976,
- Summerhill 5-9, 2-6 Seneschalstown, ???, 15/8/1976,
- Skryne w, l Gaeil Colmcille,
- Kilbride w, l Dunderry,

== Knock-out Stages ==
The winners and runners up of each group qualify for the semi-finals.

Semi-finals
1	Navan O'Mahonys	0-5
4	Walterstown	0-12
3	Summerhill	1-10
2	Martry Harps	0-4

Final
Walterstown	0-2
Summerhill	3-9

Semi-finals:

- Summerhill 1-10, 0-4 Martry Harps, Pairc Tailteann, 29/8/1976,
- Walterstown 0-12, 0-5 Navan O'Mahonys, Kells, 5/9/1976,

Final:

- Summerhill 3-9, 0-2 Walterstown, Pairc Tailteann, 19/9/1976,

== Leinster Senior Club Football Championship ==
Quarter-final:

- Raheens 1-8, 1-4 Summerhill, Naas, 27/11/1976,
