= 1977 Meath Senior Football Championship =

Meath S.F.C.
- Season: 1977
- Champions: Summerhill; 4th Senior Championship Title
- Relegated: Wolfe Tones
- Leinster SCFC: Summerhill (Final) Summerhill 5-4, 0-6 St. Vincent's
- All Ireland SCFC: Summerhill (Final) Summerhill 1-8, 4-12 St. John's
- Winning Captain: Padraig Grey (Summerhill)
- Matches: 40

The 1977 Meath Senior Football Championship is the 85th edition of the Meath GAA's premier club Gaelic football tournament for senior graded teams in County Meath, Ireland. The tournament consists of 16 teams, with the winner going on to represent Meath in the Leinster Senior Club Football Championship. The championship starts with a group stage and then progresses to a knock out stage.

Summerhill were the defending champions after they defeated Walterstown in the previous years final and they completed a 4 in a row of titles when beating Seneschalstown 3–7 to 2-7 after a replay in the final in Pairc Tailteann. Padraig Grey raised the Keegan Cup for the 'Hill. They also became the first Meath club to win a Leinster Senior Club Football Championship when they beat Dublin kingpins St. Vincent's in the final. Their journey ended in the All-Ireland semi-final when losing away to St. John's of Belfast.

This was Castletown's return to the senior grade after claiming the 1976 Meath Intermediate Football Championship title.

Wolfe Tones were regraded to the 1978 I.F.C. at the end of the campaign after 3 years as a senior club after losing to Martry Harps in the Relegation Final.

== Team changes ==
The following teams have changed division since the 1976 championship season.

=== To S.F.C. ===
Promoted from I.F.C.

- Castletown - (Intermediate Champions)

=== From S.F.C. ===
Regraded to I.F.C.

- Duleek

== Group stage ==
=== Group A ===
Team	Pld	W	L	D	PF	PA	PD	Pts
Seneschalstown	7	6	1	0	0	0	+0	12
Summerhill	7	5	2	0	0	0	+0	10
Trim	7	5	2	0	0	0	+0	10
Syddan	7	3	3	1	0	0	+0	7
Navan O'Mahonys	7	3	4	0	0	0	+0	6
Moylagh	7	3	4	0	0	0	+0	6
St. Patrick's	7	1	5	1	0	0	+0	3
Martry Harps	7	1	6	0	0	0	+0	2

Round 1

- Seneschalstown 1-6, 1-4 Trim, Athboy, 3/4/1977,
- Martry Harps 2-8, 1-4 Summerhill, Kildalkey, 3/4/1977,
- Moylagh 2-7, 1-8 St. Patrick's, Kilberry, 3/4/1977,
- Syddan 0-10, 0-3 Navan O'Mahonys, Duleek, 3/4/1977,

Round 2

- Moylagh 1-13, 0-8 Seneschalstown, Martry, 24/4/1977,
- Summerhill 1-9, 1-8 Syddan, Kilberry, 24/4/1977,
- Navan O'Mahonys 3-11, 1-2 Martry Harps, Seneschalstown, 24/4/1977,
- Trim 0-10, 0-9 St. Patrick's, Skryne, 24/4/1977,

Round 3

- Seneschalstown 2-14, 0-3 St. Patrick's, Duleek, 8/5/1977,
- Syddan 1-11, 0-6 Martry Harps, Castletown, 8/5/1977,
- Trim 1-14, 0-11 Moylagh, Athboy, 8/5/1977,
- Summerhill 2-7, 1-6 Navan O'Mahonys, Trim, 28/8/1977,

Round 4

- Seneschalstown 2-8, 1-6 Navan O'Mahonys, Kilmessan, 22/5/1977,
- Summerhill 2-13, 2-7 Moylagh, Pairc Tailteann, 22/5/1977,
- Syddan 1–6, 1-6 St. Patrick's, Seneschalstown, 22/5/1977,
- Trim 1-12, 0-5 Martry Harps, Athboy, 22/5/1977,

Round 5

- Seneschalstown 1-9, 2-4 Summerhill, Skryne, 12/6/1977,
- Trim 2-12, 1-8 Navan O'Mahonys, ???, 12/6/1977,
- Syddan 1-10, 1-8 Moylagh, Martry, 12/6/1977,
- St. Patrick's 1-9, 0-10 Martry Harps, Dunshaughlin, 12/6/1977,

Round 6:

- Seneschalstown 0-14, 1-8 Syddan, Pairc Tailteann, 26/6/1977,
- Navan O'Mahonys 0-10, 0-4 St. Patrick's, Duleek, 26/6/1977,
- Summerhill 3-12, 1-10 Trim, Ballivor, 26/6/1977,
- Moylagh 0-11, 1-7 Martry Harps, Kilskyre, 26/6/1977,

Round 7:

- Seneschalstown 2-8, 2-6 Martry Harps, Pairc Tailteann, 15/7/1977,
- Trim 2-6, 0-9 Syddan, Seneschalstown, 17/7/1977,
- Navan O'Mahonys 2-10, 1-7 Moylagh, Martry, 17/7/1977,
- Summerhill 3-14, 1-3 St. Patrick's, Skryne, 17/7/1977,

=== Group B ===
Team	Pld	W	L	D	PF	PA	PD	Pts
Walterstown	7	6	1	0	0	0	+0	12
Skryne	7	6	1	0	0	0	+0	12
Castletown	7	5	2	0	0	0	+0	10
Ballivor	7	5	2	0	0	0	+0	10
Dunderry	7	2	5	0	0	0	+0	4
Gaeil Colmcille	7	1	5	1	0	0	+0	3
Kilbride	7	1	5	1	0	0	+0	3
Wolfe Tones	7	1	6	0	0	0	+0	2

Round 1

- Ballivor 0-9, 1-5 Walterstown, Trim, 3/4/1977,
- Skryne 2-6, 1-4 Gaeil Colmcille, Seneschalstown, 3/4/1977,
- Dunderry 0-10, 0-4 Kilbride, Trim, 3/4/1977,
- Castletown 1-7, 1-4 Wolfe Tones, Martry, 3/4/1977,

Round 2

- Castletown 0-11, 0-5 Kilbride, Pairc Tailteann, 24/4/1977,
- Dunderry 1-9, 0-5 Wolfe Tones, Castletown, 24/4/1977,
- Ballivor 0-9, 1-5 Gaeil Colmcille, 8/5/1977,
- Walterstown 2-18, 1-9 Skryne, Pairc Tailteann, 28/8/1977,

Round 3

- Kilbride 1-12, 0-9 Wolfe Tones, Skryne, 8/5/1977,
- Castletown 1-10, 0-7 Dunderry, Seneschalstown, 8/5/1977,
- Walterstown 3-15, 2-5 Gaeil Colmcille, Martry, 3/7/1977,
- Skryne 3-4, 0-3 Ballivor, Summerhill, 22/7/1977,

Round 4

- Ballivor w, l Wolfe Tones, Trim, 22/5/1977,
- Walterstown 1-7, 2-3 Kilbride, Skryne, 22/5/1977,
- Skryne 1-9, 1-6 Castletown, Kilbride, 22/5/1977,
- Gaeil Colmcille 0-10, 1-5 Dunderry, Kildalkey, 22/5/1977,

Round 5

- Ballivor 1-8, 0-8 Dunderry, Trim, 12/6/1977,
- Walterstown 0-14, 1-4 Castletown, Martry, 12/6/1977,
- Skryne 6-17, 0-2 Wolfe Tones, Seneschalstown, 12/6/1977,
- Gaeil Colmcille 1-10, 1-10 Kilbride, Seneschalstown, 11/9/1977,

Round 6:

- Walterstown 0-12, 0-6 Wolfe Tones, Martry, 26/6/1977,
- Skryne 3-19, 2-4 Dunderry, Kilmessan, 26/6/1977,
- Castletown 1-7, 1-5 Gaeil Colmcille, Seneschalstown, 26/6/1977,
- Ballivor 0-12, 0-5 Kilbride, Kilmessan, 10/7/1977,

Round 7:

- Castletown 0-12, 1-7 Ballivor, Pairc Tailteann, 17/7/1977,
- Walterstown 2-18, 0-5 Dunderry, Kilberry, 17/7/1977,
- Wolfe Tones 0-9, 1-5 Gaeil Colmcille, Martry, 17/7/1977,
- Skryne 1-14, 1-1 Kilbride, Kilmessan, 17/7/1977,

== Knock-out Stages ==
=== Relegation final ===
- Martry Harps 2-15, 1-2 Wolfe Tones, Pairc Tailteann, 18/9/1977,

=== Finals ===
The winners and runners up of each group qualify for the semi-finals.

Semi-finals
1	Walterstown	1-10
4	Seneschalstown	1-11
3	Summerhill	2-10
2	Skryne	1-7

Final
Seneschalstown	2-7
Summerhill	3-7

Semi-finals:

- Seneschalstown 1-11, 1-10 Walterstown, Pairc Tailteann, 11/9/1977,
- Summerhill 2-10, 1-7 Skryne, Pairc Tailteann, 11/9/1977,

Final & final Replay:

- Summerhill 1–6, 0-9 Seneschalstown, Pairc Tailteann, 2/10/1977,
- Summerhill 3-7, 2-7 Seneschalstown, Pairc Tailteann, 16/10/1977,

== Leinster Senior Club Football Championship ==
Round 1:

- Summerhill 1-6, 0-6 Éire Óg, Dr. Cullen Park, 29/10/1977,

Quarter-final:

- Summerhill 2-13, 2-10 Athlone, Pairc Tailteann, 13/11/1977,

Semi-final:

- Summerhill 2-6, 2-4 Cooley Kickhams, Croke Park, 27/11/1977,

Final:

- Summerhill 5-4, 0-6 St. Vincent's, St. Conleth's Park, 11/12/1977,

== All-Ireland Senior Club Football Championship ==
Semi-final:

- St. John's 4-12, 1-8 Summerhill, Corrigan Park, 5/3/1978,
