= 1974 Meath Senior Football Championship =

Meath S.F.C.
- Season: 1974
- Champions: Summerhill; 1st Senior Championship Title
- Relegated: Slane
- Leinster SCFC: Summerhill (Semi-final) Ferbane 1-8, 1-4 Summerhill
- All Ireland SCFC: n/a
- Winning Captain: Austin Lyons (Summerhill)
- Matches: 40

The 1974 Meath Senior Football Championship is the 82nd edition of the Meath GAA's premier club Gaelic football tournament for senior graded teams in County Meath, Ireland. The tournament consists of 15 teams, with the winner going on to represent Meath in the Leinster Senior Club Football Championship. The championship starts with a group stage and then progresses to a knock out stage.

This season saw Bohermeen's return to the top flight after claiming the 1973 Meath Intermediate Football Championship title.

Navan O'Mahonys were the defending champions after they defeated Ballivor in the previous years final, however they failed to make it passed the group stage this season.

On 13 October 1974, Summerhill won their first Meath S.F.C. title when they defeated Bohermeen 0–9 to 0–7 in the final in Pairc Tailteann. Austin Lyons raised the Keegan Cup for the 'Hill.

== Team changes ==
The following teams have changed division since the 1973 championship season.

=== To S.F.C. ===
Promoted from I.F.C.

- Bohermeen (Intermediate Champions).

=== From S.F.C. ===
Regraded to I.F.C.

- Ballinlough

== Group stage ==
=== Group A ===
Team	Pld	W	L	D	PF	PA	PD	Pts
Summerhill	7	6	1	0	0	0	+0	12
Seneschalstown	7	6	1	0	0	0	+0	12
Walterstown	7	4	3	0	0	0	+0	8
Skryne	7	3	4	0	0	0	+0	6
Ballivor	7	3	4	0	0	0	+0	6
Dunderry	7	2	4	1	0	0	+0	5
St. Patrick's	7	2	5	0	0	0	+0	4
Slane	7	1	5	1	0	0	+0	3

Round 1:

- Summerhill 4-11, 2-5 St. Patrick's, Dunshaughlin, 7/4/1974,
- Seneschalstown 3-12, 0-7 Slane, Duleek, 7/4/1974,
- Walterstown 1-10, 1-7 Skryne, Pairc Tailteann, 7/4/1974,
- Ballivor 1-7, 1-6 Dunderry, Trim, 7/4/1974,

Round 2:

- Walterstown 3-9, 1-4 Slane, Seneschalstown, 5/5/1974,
- Summerhill 3-5, 2-7 Dunderry, Trim, 12/5/1974,
- Ballivor 1-11, 1-7 St. Patrick's, ???, 12/5/1974,
- Seneschalstown 2-10, 1-9 Skryne, Pairc Tailteann, 26/5/1974,

Round 3:

- Dunderry 1-10, 1-6 St. Patrick's, Dunshaughlin, 26/5/1974,
- Seneschalstown 0-14, 1-5 Walterstown, Pairc Tailteann, 2/6/1974,
- Slane 5-11, 0-2 Skryne, Seneschalstown, 16/6/1974,
- Summerhill 2-6, 1-8 Ballivor, Trim, 19/6/1974,

Round 4:

- Dunderry 1-7, 0-7 Walterstown, Pairc Tailteann, 16/6/1974,
- Summerhill 3-8, 3-5 Skryne, Trim, 14/7/1974,
- Seneschalstown 4-12, 0-9 Ballivor, Kilmessan, 14/7/1974,
- St. Patrick's w, l Slane, Duleek,

Round 5:

- Seneschalstown 4-7, 1-7 St. Patrick's, Duleek, 21/7/1974,
- Slane 2–4, 1-7 Dunderry, Duleek, 21/7/1974,
- Walterstown 2-8, 0-10 Summerhill, Pairc Tailteann, 11/8/1974,
- Skryne 1-10, 2-4 Ballivor, Trim, 11/8/1974,

Round 6:

- Skryne 2-11, 2-6 St. Patrick's, Duleek, 18/8/1974,
- Seneschalstown 3-12, 2-6 Dunderry, Kilberry, 18/8/1974,
- Summerhill w, l Slane,
- Walterstown w, l Ballivor,

Round 7:

- Summerhill 3-6, 0-9 Seneschalstown, Pairc Tailteann, 8/9/1974,
- St. Patrick's w, l Walterstown,
- Ballivor w, l Slane,
- Skryne w, l Dunderry,

=== Group B ===
Team	Pld	W	L	D	PF	PA	PD	Pts
Bohermeen	6	5	1	0	0	0	+0	10
Kilbride	6	4	2	0	0	0	+0	10
Trim	6	4	2	0	0	0	+0	10
Navan O'Mahonys	6	2	4	0	0	0	+0	4
Syddan	6	2	4	0	0	0	+0	4
Duleek	6	2	4	0	0	0	+0	4
Gaeil Colmcille	6	2	4	0	0	0	+0	4

Round 1:

- Kilbride 4-7, 0-6 Duleek, Skryne, 7/4/1974,
- Trim 2-5, 0-8 Gaeil Colmcille, Pairc Tailteann, 7/4/1974,
- Bohermeen 0-12, 0-9 Navan O'Mahonys, Kells, 7/4/1974,
- Syddan - Bye,

Round 2:

- Syddan 0-13, 0-3 Duleek, Castletown, 5/5/1974,
- Gaeil Colmcille 1-9, 1-7 Bohermeen, Gibbstown, 19/5/1974,
- Trim 0-8, 0-7 Navan O'Mahonys, Kilmessan, 19/5/1974,
- Kilbride - Bye,

Round 3:

- Kilbride 3-6, 0-9 Syddan, Duleek, 19/5/1974,
- Bohermeen 1-10, 1-6 Trim, Kells, 16/6/1974,
- Gaeil Colmcille 2-7, 0-6 Navan O'Mahonys, Kilberry, 16/6/1974,
- Duleek - Bye,

Round 4:

- Bohermeen 0-7, 0-4 Syddan, Kilberry, 14/7/1974,
- Kilbride 2-6, 1-8 Gaeil Colmcille, Pairc Tailteann, 7/7/1974,
- Navan O'Mahonys 2-10, 1-4 Duleek, Seneschalstown, 14/7/1974,
- Trim - Bye,

Round 5:

- Bohermeen 0-12, 0-7 Kilbride, Pairc Tailteann, 21/7/1974,
- Navan O'Mahonys 1-9, 0-9 Syddan, Castletown, 30/7/1974,
- Duleek 3-6, 1-6 Trim, Skryne, 30/7/1974,
- Gaeil Colmcille - Bye,

Round 6:

- Duleek 2-4, 0-7 Gaeil Colmcille, Kilberry, 18/8/1974,
- Kilbride 2-4, 0-9 Navan O'Mahonys, Duleek, 18/8/1974,
- Trim 1-7, 0-3 Syddan, Kells, 25/8/1974,
- Bohermeen - Bye,

Round 7:

- Bohermeen 2-10, 0-7 Duleek, Seneschalstown, 25/8/1974,
- Trim 2-8, 0-8 Kilbride, Dunshaughlin, 1/9/1974,
- Syddan w/o, scr Gaeil Colmcille, Martry, 8/9/1974,
- Navan O'Mahonys - Bye,

Semi-final playoff:

- Kilbride 1-6, 0-7 Trim, Dunshaughlin, 8/9/1974,

== Knock-out Stages ==
=== Relegation final ===
- Gaeil Colmcille w, l Slane,

=== Finals ===
The winners and runners up of each group qualify for the semi-finals.

Semi-finals
1	Summerhill	'1-11
4	Kilbride	2-7
3	Bohermeen	1-7
2	Seneschalstown	1-5

Final
Summerhill	0-9
Bohermeen	0-7

Semi-finals:

- Bohermeen 1-7, 1-5 Seneschalstown, Kells, 29/9/1974,
- Summerhill 1-11, 2-7 Kilbride, Pairc Tailteann, 29/9/1974,

Final:

- Summerhill 0-9, 0-7 Bohermeen, Pairc Tailteann, 13/10/1974,

== Leinster Senior Club Football Championship ==
Preliminary round:

- Summerhill w, l The Downs, Pairc Tailteann, 24/11/1974,

Quarter-final:

- Summerhill 3-7, 1-3 Newtown Blues, Pairc Tailteann, 6/12/1974,

Semi-final:

- Ferbane 1-8, 1-4 Summerhill, O'Connor Park, 12/1/1975,
