= Summerhill GFC =

Summerhill G.F.C.
- Druim Samhraidh
- Founded: 1931
- County: Meath
- Nickname: The Hill
- Colours: Blue and Yellow/Gold
- Grounds: Square Park
- Coordinates: 53°29′01″N 6°44′21″W

Playing kits
Standard colours

Senior Club Championships
	All Ireland	Leinster champions	Meath champions
Football:	0	1	9

Summerhill Gaelic Football Club is a Gaelic Athletic Association club located in the village of Summerhill in County Meath, Ireland. The team was first founded in 1905 but later disbanded. The current club was founded in 1931, and has since won 8 Meath Senior Football Championships. Summerhill is one of three Meath teams to have won the Leinster Senior Club Football Championship.

== History ==
=== Early history ===
The first GAA club in Summerhill was founded in 1905, little is known about this team and is thought to have disbanded sometime around 1913 or 1914. After this, Summerhill had no local club and many players went to play for teams in nearby towns, mostly going to Bohermeen who were at that time the most prominent team in the county. With local players gone, it would take until 1931 for Summerhill to found another club. The team would go on to many Junior and Intermediate level Championships before gaining success in the Senior Football Championship in the 1970s.

=== 1970s ===
1973 saw Summerhill win their first ever Feis Cup and 1974 proved to be the most memorable year in the history of the club up to that time. Summerhill had beaten Walterstown and Slane, and then beat Kilbride in a semi-final by 1–11 to 2–7. So, for the first time in the club's sixty-nine year history, Summerhill stepped onto Páirc Tailteann in Navan, on 13 October 1974, to play in a Meath Senior Football Championship final against Bohermeen. Summerhill won the championship and retained Feis Cup.

In 1975, Summerhill set out to retain their title. They reached the final and had to compete against archrivals Navan O'Mahonys. Summerhill went on to win 0–10, 0–09. Summerhill would continue their glorious run by retaining the title in 1976 and 1977. And the club won the 1977–78 Leinster Senior Club Football Championship. After a controversial final in 1978, Summerhill's run was finally ended by Walterstown who won by one point. The club reached the final in 1979 and again lost this time to Navan O'Mahonys. This would prove to be a transition for the club, glory days had ended.

=== 1980s onwards ===
Summerhill reached the final in 1982, again losing out to Walterstown. The club won the Feis Cup in 1985 and won the Senior Football Championship again in 1986 by defeating Seneschalstown, this win would split Navan O'Mahony's 1985 title from its four consecutive titles following 1986. Summerhill reached the Senior Football Championship final in 1988 and 1990, losing to Navan O'Mahony's on both occasions. Summerhill reached the final in 2008, where they were beaten once again by Navan O'Mahony's. Between the finals, Summerhill won three more Feis Cups in 1991, 1996 and 2006. Summerhill were in Group C of the 2010 Championship. They started off the competition with a 0–17 to 2–6 defeat of Donaghmore Ashbourne, but would later slump to two consecutive defeats against Navan O'Mahony's and Duleek/Bellewstown. Their final game on 8 August was a 1–8 to 0–10 win over Oldcastle. Summerhill finished 4th in Group C, with 4 points, subsequently failing to qualify.

=== Resurgence 2011–2013 ===
Summerhill were in Group A of the 2011 Championship. They had a great start to the championship qualifiers, with a 3–14 to 0–6 win against Trim. They won their next two games against Blackhall Gaels and Oldcastle. Summerhill lost the last two games of the qualifiers to Simonstown and Wolfe Tones, but already had 6 points, placing them second in Group A.

Summerhill started off their finals on 21 August 2011, with a 2–10 to 0–12 win over Navan O'Mahony's. In the semi-finals they faced Group A winners Wolfe Tones, the match was played on 11 September and Summerhill had a 1–7 to 0–6 win over Wolfe Tones. This qualified them for their first final since 2008.

The final was played on 2 October in Páirc Tailteann. Summerhill faced Dunshaughlin. Dunshaughlin were seen as underdogs entering the game but left Summerhill trailing for most of the second half, with Dunshaughlin playing a defensive game. Summerhill levelled with less than three minutes left. The game ended 0–10 to 0–10. The replay was played on 16 October, and Summerhill defeated Dunshaughlin 0–14 to 1–9, after extra time. This gave Summerhill their first Senior Football Championship title since 1986.

After a one-year gap, Summerhill were crowned champions of Meath once again in 2013. They reached the semi-finals of the Leinster Championship that year, losing 1–14 to 1–10 against Dublin's St Vincents GAA.

== Notable players ==
- Mick Lyons (captain of the Meath All-Ireland winning team on 1987)
- Mattie Kerrigan (winner of All-Ireland Medal with Meath in 1967)
- Padric Lyons
- Austin Lyons
- Mark O Reilly (Man of the match all Ireland final 1999)
- Adrian Kenny
- David Dalton
- Conor Gillespie
- Caolan Young
- Barry Dardis
- Ronan Ryan
- Eoghan Frayne (Meath captain 2025)

== Honours ==
- Meath Senior Football Championship (9): 1974, 1975, 1976, 1977, 1986, 2011, 2013,2023, 2025
- Leinster Senior Club Football Championship (1): 1978
- Feis Cup (7): 1973, 1974, 1985, 1991, 1996, 2008, 2019

Preceded by Navan O'Mahonys	Meath Senior Football Champions; 2013	Succeeded by Navan O'Mahonys

Preceded by Portlaoise	Leinster Senior Club Football Champions; 1978	Succeeded by Walsh Island
