= Donaghmore Ashbourne GAA =

Gaelic games club in County Meath, Ireland

Donaghmore/Ashbourne
- Domhnach Mór—Cill Dhéagláin
- Founded: 1923
- County: Meath
- Colours: Green and White
- Grounds: Killegland West
- Coordinates: 53.510163°N 6.411062°W

Playing kits
Standard colours

Senior Club Championships
	All Ireland	Leinster champions	Meath champions
Football:	0	0	3

Donaghmore/Ashbourne GAA is a Gaelic Athletic Association club located in the town of Ashbourne in County Meath, Ireland. The club competes in Meath competitions. The team was founded in 1923 under the name Donaghmore but was renamed Donaghmore/Ashbourne in 1996 to reflect the increased number of players and supporters from Ashbourne. The club has won 3 Meath Senior Football Championship.

== History ==
The club was founded under the name Donaghmore in 1923 in the townland 3 km south of Ashbourne. The club won three Senior Football Championships in 1927, 1928 and 1942. In more recent times the club has had success at Junior and Intermediate levels and currently has 45 teams competing at Football, Hurling, Ladies Football and Camogie.

== Honours ==
- Meath Senior Football Championship: 3
  - 1927, 1928, 1942
- Meath Intermediate Football Championship: 4
  - 1938, 1950, 1959, 2007
- Meath Minor Football Championship: 4
  - 2006, 2007, 2008, 2013
- Feis Cup Winners: 5
  - 1938, 1950, 1959, 2016, 2017
- Meath Intermediate Hurling Championship: 1
  - 1976
- Meath Junior Hurling Championship: 2
  - 1974, 1994
- Meath Junior 2 Hurling Championship: 2
  - 1989, 2009
- Meath Intermediate Camogie Championship: 1
  - 2010

Preceded by Skryne	Meath Senior Football Champions; 1942	Succeeded by Duleek
