= Jack Quinn (Gaelic footballer) =

Irish Gaelic footballer

Personal information
- Native name: Seán Ó Coinn (Irish)
- Born: 1943 (age 82–83) Kilbride, County Meath, Ireland
- Occupation: Publican
- Height: 6 ft 1 in (185 cm)

Sport
- Sport: Gaelic football
- Position: Full-back
Club
- Years: Club
- Kilbride
Club titles
- Meath titles: 5
Inter-county
- Years: County
- 1963-1977: Meath
Inter-county titles
- Leinster titles: 4
- All-Irelands: 1
- NFL: 1
- All Stars: 0

John A. "Jack" Quinn (born 1943) is an Irish former Gaelic footballer who played at club level with Kilbride and at inter-county level with the Meath senior football team. He usually lined out as a full-back.

== Career ==
Quinn was a member of the Kilbride club team that earned promotion from junior to senior in the space of five seasons. After winning the respective Meath JFC and Meath IFC titles in 1960 and 1962, he won his first Meath SFC title in 1964. He won a second title in 1967 and then completed a three-in-a-row between 1969 and 1971. Having represented the Meath minor football team, Quinn won an All-Ireland Junior Championship title in 1962 before being picked for the senior team in 1963. He was one of the key figures on the team that won the Leinster Championship that year. Quinn was at full-back for the All-Ireland final defeat by Galway. He was again a member of the team, alongside his brothers Gerry and Martin, when Meath beat Cork in the 1967 All-Ireland final. Quinn won a fourth and final Leinster Championship in 1970 before captaining the team to a defeat by Kerry in the All-Ireland final.

== Honours ==
Kilbride

- Meath Senior Football Championship: 1964, 1967, 1969, 1970, 1971
- Meath Intermediate Football Championship: 1962
- Meath Junior Football Championship: 1960

Meath

- All-Ireland Senior Football Championship: 1967
- Leinster Senior Football Championship: 1964, 1966, 1967, 1970 (c)
- National Football League: 1974–75
- All-Ireland Junior Football Championship: 1962
- Leinster Junior Football Championship: 1962

Sporting positions
Preceded by Peter Darby	Meath senior football team captain 1968	Succeeded by
Preceded by	Meath senior football team captain 1970	Succeeded by
