= Martin Quinn (Gaelic footballer) =

Irish Gaelic footballer (1938–2021)

Personal information
- Native name: Máirtín Ó Coinn (Irish)
- Born: 1938 Kilbride, County Meath, Ireland
- Died: 12 December 2021 (aged 83) Kilbride, County Meath, Ireland

Sport
- Sport: Gaelic football
- Position: Right corner-forward
Club
- Years: Club
- Kilbride
Club titles
- Meath titles: 5
Inter-county
- Years: County
- Meath
Inter-county titles
- Leinster titles: 2
- All-Irelands: 1
- NFL: 0

Martin Quinn (1938 – 12 December 2021) was an Irish Gaelic footballer who played at club level with Kilbride and at inter-county level with the Meath senior football team. He usually lined out at full back.

== Career ==
Quinn was full-back on the Kilbride team that earned promotion from junior to senior in the space of five seasons. After winning the respective Meath JFC and Meath IFC titles in 1960 and 1962, he won his first Meath SFC title in 1964. He won a second title in 1967 and then completed a three-in-a-row between 1969 and 1971. Having represented the Meath minor football team for two years, Quinn made his senior debut in a tournament game against Kerry in 1958. He was one of the key figures on the team that won the Leinster Championship in 1964. A suspension ruled him out of Meath's Leinster Championship success in 1966, but was introduced as a late substitute in the All-Ireland final against Galway. Quinn was a member of the panel, alongside his brothers Jack and Gerry, when Meath beat Cork in the 1967 All-Ireland final.

== Death ==
Quinn died on 12 December 2021.

== Honours ==
Kilbride

- Meath Senior Football Championship: 1964, 1967, 1969, 1970, 1971
- Meath Intermediate Football Championship: 1962
- Meath Junior Football Championship: 1960

Meath

- All-Ireland Senior Football Championship: 1967
- Leinster Senior Football Championship: 1964, 1967

Sporting positions
Preceded by Dinny Donnelly	Meath senior football team captain 1965	Succeeded by Dave Carty
