= Gerry Quinn (Gaelic footballer) =

Irish Gaelic footballer (1940–2020)

Personal information
- Native name: Gearóid Ó Coinn (Irish)
- Born: 1940 Kilbride, County Meath, Ireland
- Died: 18 October 2020 (aged 80) Kilbride, County Meath, Ireland
- Height: 5 ft 10 in (178 cm)

Sport
- Sport: Gaelic football
- Position: Full-forward
Club
- Years: Club
- Kilbride
Club titles
- Meath titles: 5
Inter-county
- Years: County
- Meath
Inter-county titles
- Leinster titles: 3
- All-Irelands: 1
- NFL: 0

Gerald T. Quinn (1940 – 18 October 2020) was an Irish Gaelic footballer who played at club level with Kilbride and at inter-county level with the Meath senior football team. He usually lined out as a forward.

== Career ==
Quinn was a member of the Kilbride club team that earned promotion from junior to senior in the space of five seasons. After winning the respective Meath JFC and Meath IFC titles in 1960 and 1962, he won his first Meath SFC title in 1964. He won a second title in 1967 and then completed a three-in-a-row between 1969 and 1971. Having represented the Meath minor football team in 1958, Quinn won an All-Ireland Junior Championship title in 1962 before being picked for the senior team in 1964. He was one of the key figures on the team that won the Leinster Championship that year. Quinn was at full-forward for the All-Ireland final defeat by Galway. He was a member of the panel, alongside his brothers Jack and Martin, when Meath beat Cork in the 1967 All-Ireland final.

== Death ==
Quinn died on 18 October 2020.

== Honours ==
Kilbride

- Meath Senior Football Championship: 1964, 1967, 1969, 1970, 1971
- Meath Intermediate Football Championship: 1962
- Meath Junior Football Championship: 1960

Meath

- All-Ireland Senior Football Championship: 1967
- Leinster Senior Football Championship: 1964, 1966, 1967
- All-Ireland Junior Football Championship: 1962
- Leinster Junior Football Championship: 1962
