= 1973 Meath Intermediate Football Championship =

Meath I.F.C.
- Season: 1973
- Champions: Bohermeen; 1st Intermediate Football Championship title
- Relegated: Flathouse (Dissolved); Ratoath; St. Peter's Dunboyne

The 1973 Meath Intermediate Football Championship is the 47th edition of the Meath GAA's premier club Gaelic football tournament for intermediate graded teams in County Meath, Ireland. The tournament consists of 21 teams. The championship starts with a group stage and then progresses to a knock out stage.

This year marked the birth of St. John's after the amalgamation of Intermediate clubs Garryowen and Kilberry.

No team was relegated from the S.F.C. the previous year.

Ballinabrackey and Dunsany were promoted after claiming the 1972 Meath Junior Football Championship title and runners-up spot respectively.

On 14 October 1973, Bohermeen claimed their 1st Intermediate championship title when they defeated Moylagh 0-13 to 1-7 in the final in Pairc Tailteann, and thus returned the top flight of Meath club football.

Ratoath and St. Peter's Dunboyne were relegated to the 1974 J.F.C. after 3 and 10 years in the middle grade respectively.

The 1973 I.F.C. was rife with controversy due to the expulsion of Dunboyne parish side Flathouse from the championship and suspension from all activities for 5 years. In the final round of their Group C encounter with Castletown on 12 August, referee Joe Tormay from the Donaghmore club was attacked by Flathouse players with just 4 minutes of the match remaining. He was admitted to Navan Hospital and detained for several days. At a subsequent County Board meeting, it was proposed to ban the Flathouse club for a period of 2 years. The referee's report also stated that a Flathouse player had struck him at the beginning of the second half but play continued. Flathouse players and delegates were questioned by the County Board, however each player mentioned in the referee's report denied all charges. However a Castletown delegate present at the meeting came forward to verify the validity of the referee's report. This sparked uproar from the Flathouse contingent present and the meeting was threatened to be adjourned should any more outbursts occur. The Chairman of the County Board stated that it was the "most scandalous" report to ever come before the Board and banned Flathouse for 2 years from all club activities. Pandemonium from Flathouse ensued as they encroached upon the referee in the meeting room and the Gardaí were called to the scene, which defused the situation. Flathouse were subsequently banned for 5 years and soon dissolved. They re-formed again in 1974 in the Junior B ranks as St. Paul's Clonee.

== Team changes ==
The following teams have changed division since the 1972 championship season.

=== From I.F.C. ===
Promoted to S.F.C.

- Summerhill - (Intermediate Champions)

Relegated to 1973 J.A.F.C.

- St. Colmcille's

Amalgamation:

- St. John's - Formed from Intermediate clubs Garryowen and Kilberry.

=== To I.F.C. ===
Regraded from S.F.C.

- St. Vincent's

Promoted from 1972 J.A.F.C.

- Ballinabrackey - (Junior 'A' Champions)
- Dunsany - (Junior Runners-Up)

== Group stage ==
There are 3 groups called Group A, B and C. The top finishers in each group will qualify for the semi-finals, with 2nd place in each group entering a playoff for the semi-finals.

=== Group A ===
Team	Pld	W	L	D	PF	PA	PD	Pts
St. Vincent's	6	6	0	0	0	0	+0	12
Enfield	6	5	1	0	0	0	+0	10
Kilallon	6	4	2	0	0	0	+0	8
Martry	5	3	1	1	0	0	+0	7
St. Mary's	6	2	3	1	0	0	+0	5
St. Brigid's Ballinacree	7	2	5	0	0	0	+0	4
Martinstown	7	1	6	0	0	0	+0	2
St. Peter's Dunboyne	7	0	7	0	0	0	+0	0

Round 1:

- Enfield 1-9, 0-11 Kilallon, Athboy, 1/4/1973,
- St. Brigid's 1-10, 0-4 Martinstown, Kells, 1/4/1973,
- Martry 3-8, 3-8 St. Mary's, Kilmessan, 8/4/1973,
- St. Vincent's 1-10, 1-4 St. Peter's Dunboyne, Dunshaughlin, 15/4/1973,

Round 2:

- Martry 2-9, 1-8 St. Brigid's, Athboy, 15/4/1973,
- St. Vincent's 2-9, 0-3 Enfield, Dunshaughlin, 29/4/1973,
- Kilallon w, l St. Peter's Dunboyne, Trim, 29/5/1973,
- St. Mary's 2-8, 2-2 Martinstown,

Round 3:

- Martry 3-16, 1-2 Martinstown, Kells, 29/4/1973,
- Enfield 1-9, 2-4 St. Peter's Dunboyne, Trim, 13/5/1973,
- St. Vincent's 2-9, 1-9 Kilallon, Kilberry, 13/5/1973,
- St. Brigid's 1-9, 0-9 St. Mary's, Kells, 13/5/1973,

Round 4:

- St. Vincent's 2-11, 0-6 Martinstown, Kilberry, 10/6/1973,
- Kilallon 0-8, 0-7 St. Mary's, Kilberry, 24/6/1973,
- Enfield 2-7, 0-9 St. Brigid's, Athboy, 24/6/1973,
- Martry 4-10, 1-6 St. Peter's Dunboyne, Kilmessan, 24/6/1973,

Round 5:

- Enfield 3-3, 1-4 Martry, Kildalkey, 1/7/1973,
- Kilallon 1-11, 0-9 Martinstown, Kells, 8/7/1973,
- St. Mary's w, l St. Peter's Dunboyne, Skryne, 8/7/1973,
- St. Vincent's w, l St. Brigid's, Pairc Tailteann, 15/7/1973,

Round 6:

- Kilallon 1-12, 1-4 St. Brigid's, Kells, 29/7/1973,
- Enfield v St. Mary's, Dunshaughlin, 29/7/1973,
- St. Vincent's v Martry, Seneschalstown, 29/7/1973,
- Martinstown w, l St. Peter's Dunboyne,

Round 7:

- Kilallon v Martry, Kells, 5/8/1973,
- St. Vincent's w, l St. Mary's,
- Enfield w, l Martinstown,
- St. Brigid's w, l St. Peter's Dunboyne,

=== Group B ===
Team	Pld	W	L	D	PF	PA	PD	Pts
Moylagh	7	6	1	0	0	0	+0	12
Dunshaughlin	7	6	1	0	0	0	+0	12
Drumree	7	5	2	0	0	0	+0	10
Rathkenny	7	5	2	0	0	0	+0	10
Kilmainhamwood	7	2	5	0	0	0	+0	4
Boardsmill	7	1	6	0	0	0	+0	2
Donaghmore	7	1	6	0	0	0	+0	2
Dunsany	7	1	6	0	0	0	+0	2

Round 1:

- Rathkenny 0-8, 0-7 Moylagh, Martry, 1/4/1973,
- Boardsmill 0-11, 2-3 Dunsany, Trim, 1/4/1973,
- Dunshaughlin 1-8, 0-5 Drumree, Skryne, 1/4/1973, *
- Kilmainhamwood 2-9, 2-5 Donaghmore, Seneschalstown, 1/4/1973,

Round 2:

- Rathkenny 0-9, 0-7 Donaghmore, Duleek, 15/4/1973,
- Moylagh 0-14, 1-6 Kilmainhamwood, Kells, 15/4/1973,
- Dunshaughlin 1-7, 0-3 Boardsmill, Trim, 15/4/1973,
- Drumree 1-12, 1-7 Dunsany, Skryne, 29/4/1973,

Round 3:

- Rathkenny 3-2, 0-7 Kilmainhamwood, Castletown, 29/4/1973,
- Moylagh w, l Donaghmore, Pairc Tailteann, 29/4/1973,
- Dunshaughlin w, l Dunsany, Skryne, 13/5/1973,
- Drumree 2-11, 0-1 Boardsmill, Summerhill, 13/5/1973,

Round 4:

- Rathkenny 2-10, 1-7 Boardsmill, Kilmessan, 24/6/1973,
- Dunshaughlin 1-7, 1-6 Kilmainhamwood, Kilberry, 24/6/1973,
- Dunsany 4-12, 1-2 Donaghmore, Skryne, 24/6/1973,
- Moylagh 3-12, 1-6 Drumree, Pairc Tailteann, 24/6/1973,

Round 5:

- Dunshaughlin 1-7, 0-5 Rathkenny, Seneschalstown, 1/7/1973,
- Moylagh 6-9, 1-9 Dunsany, Martry, 8/7/1973,
- Drumree 1-9, 2-4 Kilmainhamwood, Kilberry, 8/7/1973,
- Donaghmore 4-8, 0-8 Boardsmill, Dunshaughlin, 8/7/1973,

Round 6:

- Dunshaughlin w, l Donaghmore, Skryne, 29/7/1973,
- Drumree w, l Rathkenny, Skryne, 29/7/1973,
- Moylagh w, l Boardsmill, Athboy, 5/8/1973,
- Kilmainhamwood w/o, scr Dunsany,

Round 7:

- Moylagh 0-12, 0-10 Dunshaughlin, Martry, 19/8/1973,
- Rathkenny w, l Dunsany, Pairc Tailteann, 19/8/1973,
- Kilmainhamwood w, l Boardsmill,
- Drumree w, l Donaghmore,

- The Round 1 match between parish rivals Dunshaughlin and Drumree was abandoned with one minute remaining due to a Drumree player refusing to leave the pitch when sent off. At a later date, the County Board decided to award the scoreline and points to Dunshaughlin.

=== Group C ===
Team	Pld	W	L	D	PF	PA	PD	Pts
Bohermeen	6	4	0	2	0	0	+0	10
Castletown	6	5	1	0	0	0	+0	10
Oldcastle	6	3	2	1	0	0	+0	7
Flathouse	6	3	2	1	0	0	+0	7
St. John's	6	2	2	2	0	0	+0	6
Ballinabrackey	6	1	5	0	0	0	+0	2
Ratoath	6	0	6	0	0	0	+0	0

Round 1:

- Flathouse 0-14, 1-5 Ratoath, Dunshaughlin, 1/4/1973,
- Oldcastle 1-7, 1-7 St. John's, Kells, 1/4/1973,
- Bohermeen 2-6, 1-6 Castletown, Kells, 15/4/1973,
- Ballinabrackey - Bye,

Round 2:

- Oldcastle 6-11, 0-3 Ratoath, Kilberry, 15/4/1973,
- Flathouse w, l St. John's, Dunshaughlin, 15/4/1973,
- Bohermeen 2-14, 0-1 Ballinabrackey, Kildalkey, 24/4/1973,
- Castletown - Bye,

Round 3:

- Castletown w, l Ballinabrackey, Kildalkey, 13/5/1973,
- Oldcastle 6-6, 1-5 Flathouse, Pairc Tailteann, 13/5/1973,
- St. John's w, l Ratoath,
- Bohermeen - Bye,

Round 4:

- Oldcastle w, l Ballinabrackey, Trim, 20/5/1973,
- Bohermeen 0-10, 2-4 St. John's, Martry, 24/6/1973,
- Castletown w, l Ratoath,
- Flathouse - Bye,

Round 5:

- Castletown 0-11, 0-6 Oldcastle, Martrym 24/6/1973,
- St. John's 7-4, 1-5 Ballinabrackey, Summerhill, 1/7/1973,
- Bohermeen 0-10, 0-10 Flathouse, Pairc Tailteann, 8/7/1973,
- Ratoath - Bye,

Round 6:

- Castletown 0-12, 2-4 St. John's, Kells, 8/7/1973,
- Flathouse w, l Ballinabrackey, Summerhill, 29/7/1973,
- Bohermeen w, l Ratoath,
- Oldcastle - Bye,

Round 7:

- Castletown 0-9, 0-6 Flathouse, Pairc Tailteann, 12/8/1973,
- Bohermeen w, l Oldcastle, Kells, 12/8/1973,
- Ballinabrackey w, l Ratoath,
- St. John's - Bye,

== Knock-out Stages ==
The teams in the quarter-finals are the first and second placed teams from each group.

Semi-Finals
St. Vincent's	2-4
Moylagh	3-9
Bohermeen	1-8
Dunshaughlin	2-4

Final
Moylagh	1-7
Bohermeen	0-13

Semi-final Playoffs:

- Dunshaughlin 0-10, 0-10 Enfield, Trim, 9/9/1973,
- Dunshaughlin 2-9, 0-7 Enfield, Pairc Tailteann, 16/9/1973, (Replay)
- Dunshaughlin 2-7, 0-9 Castletown, Pairc Tailteann, 30/9/1973,

Semi-final:

- Moylagh 3-9, 2-4 St. Vincent's, Pairc Tailteann, 16/9/1973,
- Bohermeen 1-8, 2-4 Dunshaughlin, Pairc Tailteann, 7/10/1973,

Final:

- Bohermeen 0-13, 1-7 Moylagh, Pairc Tailteann, 14/10/1973,
