= 1973 Meath Senior Football Championship =

Meath S.F.C.
- Season: 1973
- Champions: Navan O'Mahonys; 8th Senior Championship Title
- Relegated: Ballinlough
- Leinster SCFC: Navan O'Mahonys (preliminary round) Cooley Kickhams w, l Navan O'Mahonys
- All Ireland SCFC: n/a
- Winning Captain: Ronan Giles (Navan O'Mahonys)
- Matches: 40

The 1973 Meath Senior Football Championship is the 81st edition of the Meath GAA's premier club Gaelic football tournament for senior graded teams in County Meath, Ireland. The tournament consists of 15 teams, with the winner going on to represent Meath in the Leinster Senior Club Football Championship. The championship starts with a group stage and then progresses to a knock out stage.

This season saw Summerhill's return to the top flight after claiming the 1972 Meath Intermediate Football Championship title, their 3rd period as a senior club and 3rd season altogether.

Seneschalstown, the defending champions who had secured victory over Navan O'Mahonys in the previous year's final after a replay, relinquished their title this season at the semi-final stage. They were defeated by Ballivor, who went on to become the eventual runners-up.

Ballinlough were relegated to the 1974 I.F.C. after losing the Relegation Final to Syddan.

On 7 October 1973, Navan O'Mahonys won their 8th Meath S.F.C. title when they defeated Ballivor 1-9 to 1-7 in the final in Pairc Tailteann. Ronan Giles raised the Keegan Cup for the Hoops.

== Team changes ==
The following teams have changed division since the 1972 championship season.

=== To S.F.C. ===
Promoted from I.F.C.

- Summerhill (Intermediate Champions).

=== From S.F.C. ===
Regraded to I.F.C.

- St. Vincent's

== Group stage ==
=== Group A ===
Team	Pld	W	L	D	PF	PA	PD	Pts
Seneschalstown	6	6	0	0	0	0	+0	12
Summerhill	7	5	1	1	0	0	+0	11
Dunderry	6	3	2	1	0	0	+0	7
Walterstown	5	2	1	2	0	0	+0	6
Trim	5	3	2	0	0	0	+0	6
Gaeil Colmcille	7	2	5	0	0	0	+0	4
Slane	7	1	5	1	0	0	+0	3
Syddan	7	0	6	1	0	0	+0	1

Round 1:

- Seneschalstown 1-7, 0-6 Trim, Dunshaughlin, 15/4/1973,
- Summerhill 1-8, 1-7 Slane, Skryne, 15/4/1973,
- Dunderry 4-9, 1-5 Gaeil Colmcille, Martry, 15/4/1973,
- Walterstown 0-12, 2-5 Syddan, Kilberry, 15/4/1973,

Round 2:

- Summerhill 3-9, 1-8 Trim, Kildalkey, 29/4/1973,
- Dunderry 2-13, 2-4 Syddan, Kilberry, 29/4/1973,
- Gaeil Colmcille 1-9, 1-5 Walterstown, Martry, 29/4/1973,
- Seneschalstown 1-11, 0-7 Slane, Pairc Tailteann, 13/5/1973,

Round 3:

- Walterstown 2-5, 1-8 Dunderry, Pairc Tailteann, 13/5/1973,
- Gaeil Colmcille w, l Syddan, Gibbstown, 13/5/1973,
- Trim 2-8, 1-5 Slane, Pairc Tailteann, 24/6/1973,
- Seneschalstown 4-13, 1-10 Summerhill, Skryne, 24/6/1973,

Round 4:

- Seneschalstown 1-10, 1-6 Dunderry, Kilberry, 1/7/1973,
- Summerhill 1-12, 1-3 Gaeil Colmcille, Kilmessan, 1/7/1973,
- Walterstown 2-10, 0-4 Slane, Pairc Tailteann, 8/7/1973,
- Trim 2-11, 0-5 Syddan, Martry, 8/7/1973,

Round 5:

- Seneschalstown w, l Syddan, Kilberry, 29/7/1973,
- Summerhill 1-6, 0-9 Walterstown, Dunshaughlin, 29/7/1973,
- Dunderry 1-7, 0-5 Slane, Pairc Tailteann, 29/7/1973,
- Trim 3-8, 2-6 Gaeil Colmcille, Pairc Tailteann, 29/7/1973,

Round 6:

- Seneschalstown w, l Gaeil Colmcille, Dunshaughlin, 5/8/1973,
- Walterstown v Trim, Pairc Tailteann, 19/8/1973,
- Summerhill 1-10, 1-5 Dunderry, Trim, 26/8/1973,
- Slane 2-5, 1-8 Syddan, Kilberry, 26/8/1973,

Round 7:

- Summerhill 2-9, 1-6 Syddan, Pairc Tailteann, 2/9/1973,
- Slane w, l Gaeil Colmcille,
- Seneschalstown v Walterstown,
- Dunderry v Trim,

=== Group B ===
Team	Pld	W	L	D	PF	PA	PD	Pts
Navan O'Mahonys	6	6	0	0	0	0	+0	12
Ballivor	6	3	1	2	0	0	+0	7
Skryne	6	3	3	0	0	0	+0	6
Duleek	6	3	3	0	0	0	+0	6
Kilbride	6	2	3	1	0	0	+0	5
St. Patrick's	6	2	3	1	0	0	+0	5
Ballinlough	6	0	6	0	0	0	+0	0

Round 1:

- Duleek 1-8, 1-6 Ballinlough, Kilbride, 1/4/1973,
- Ballivor 2-5, 1-8 Kilbride, Kilmessan, 15/4/1973,
- Navan O'Mahonys 0-11, 1-6 Skryne, Duleek, 15/4/1973,
- St. Patrick's - Bye,

Round 2:

- St. Patrick's 1-13, 2-7 Ballinlough, Pairc Tailteann, 15/4/1973,
- Navan O'Mahonys w, l Ballivor, Trim, 29/4/1973,
- Skryne w, l Kilbride, Dunshaughlin, 29/4/1973,
- Duleek - Bye,

Round 3:

- Duleek w, l St. Patrick's, Seneschalstown, 29/4/1973,
- Navan O'Mahonys 1-6, 0-4 Kilbride, Kilmessan, 13/5/1973,
- Ballivor 2-8, 1-3 Skryne, Trim, 13/5/1973,
- Ballinlough - Bye,

Round 4:

- Duleek 4-8, 4-6 Kilbride, Skryne, 10/6/1973,
- Navan O'Mahonys 2-13, 1-4 Ballinlough, Martry, 24/6/1973,
- St. Patrick's 2-8, 1-8 Skryne, Seneschalstown, 24/6/1973,
- Ballivor - Bye,

Round 5:

- Skryne 0-18, 0-6 Duleek, Seneschalstown, 8/7/1973,
- Navan O'Mahonys 0-13, 0-2 St. Patrick's, Duleek, 8/7/1973,
- Ballivor w/o, scr Ballinlough, Athboy, 8/7/1973,
- Kilbride - Bye,

Round 6:

- Ballivor 1-7, 1-7 St. Patrick's, Dunshaughlin, 5/8/1973,
- Navan O'Mahonys 1-12, 1-8 Duleek, Skryne, 5/8/1973,
- Kilbride w/o, scr Ballinlough,
- Skryne - Bye,

Round 7:

- Ballivor w, l Duleek, Dunshaughlin, 26/8/1973,
- Skryne w/o, scr Ballinlough,
- Kilbride w, l St. Patrick's,
- Navan O'Mahonys - Bye,

== Knock-out Stages ==
=== Relegation final ===
- Syddan 2-14, 1-5 Ballinlough, Kells, 30/9/1973,

=== Finals ===
The winners and runners up of each group qualify for the semi-finals.

Semi-finals
1	Seneschalstown	2-6
4	Ballivor	0-14
3	Navan O'Mahonys	3-4 R
2	Summerhill	0-9 R

Final
Navan O'Mahonys	1-9
Ballivor	1-7

Semi-finals:

- Ballivor 0-14, 2-6 Seneschalstown, Pairc Tailteann, 9/9/1973,
- Navan O'Mahonys 1-6, 1-6 Summerhill Pairc Tailteann, 16/9/1973,
- Navan O'Mahonys 3-4, 0-9 Summerhill, Trim, 30/9/1973

Final:

- Navan O'Mahonys 1-9, 1-7 Ballivor, Pairc Tailteann, 7/10/1973,

== Leinster Senior Club Football Championship ==
Preliminary round:

- Cooley Kickhams w, l Navan O'Mahonys, ???, 11/11/1973,
