= Gerry Quinn =

Gerry Quinn may refer to:

- Gerry Quinn (hurler) (born 1980), Irish hurler
- Gerry Quinn (sportsman, born 1917) (1917–1968), Irish cricketer and rugby union international
- Gerry Quinn (Gaelic footballer) (1940–2020), Irish Gaelic footballer
