= 1972 Meath Intermediate Football Championship =

Meath I.F.C.
- Season: 1972
- Champions: Summerhill; 1st Intermediate Football Championship title
- Relegated: St. Colmcille's

The 1972 Meath Intermediate Football Championship is the 46th edition of the Meath GAA's premier club Gaelic football tournament for intermediate graded teams in County Meath, Ireland. The tournament consists of 23 teams. The championship starts with a group stage and then progresses to a knock out stage.

Drumree were relegated from the S.F.C. the previous year after 2 years as a top flight club.

Donaghmore and Boardsmill were promoted after claiming the 1971 Meath Junior Football Championship title and Junior 'A' Divisional runners-up spot respectively. St. Brigid's were also promoted after plying their trade in the Junior B (or Division II) ranks in 1971.

On 1 October 1972, Summerhill claimed their 1st Intermediate championship title when they defeated Martry 3-7 to 2-4 in the final in Pairc Tailteann, and thus returned the top flight of Meath club football, only their third period in the top flight and third year in total.

St. Colmcille's were relegated to the 1973 J.F.C. after just two years in the middle grade.

== Team changes ==
The following teams have changed division since the 1971 championship season.

=== From I.F.C. ===
Promoted to S.F.C.

- Ballivor - (Intermediate Champions)

Relegated to 1972 J.A.F.C.

- Ballinabrackey
- Cortown
- St. Theresa's

Discontinued Affiliation

- Salesian College Warrenstown

=== To I.F.C. ===
Regraded from S.F.C.

- Drumree

Promoted from 1972 J.A.F.C.

- Donaghmore - (Junior Champions)
- Boardsmill - (Junior 'A' Divisional Runners-Up)

Promoted from 1972 J.B.F.C.

- St. Brigid's Ballinacree

== Group stage ==
There are 2 groups called Group A and B. The top two finishers in each group will qualify for the Semi-Finals.

On 28 August, the County Board invoked Bye Law 62 which states that all teams already out of contention for championship honours be eliminated or have no bearing on the outcome. This was invoked due to the severe time limit for the completion of fixtures.

=== Group A ===
Team	Pld	W	L	D	PF	PA	PD	Pts
Castletown	11	11	0	0	0	0	+0	22
Martry	11	9	1	1	0	0	+0	19
Moylagh	11	9	2	0	0	0	+0	18
St. Peter's Dunboyne	8	5	3	0	0	0	+0	10
Kilmainhamwood	9	4	4	1	0	0	+0	9
Martinstown	8	4	4	0	0	0	+0	8
St. Brigid's Ballinacree	8	4	4	0	0	0	+0	8
Enfield	7	3	4	0	0	0	+0	6
Oldcastle	9	3	6	0	0	0	+0	6
Rathkenny	7	2	5	0	0	0	+0	4
Kilallon	11	1	10	0	0	0	+0	2
Kilberry	11	0	11	0	0	0	+0	0

Round 1:

- Castletown 2-5, 2-3 St. Brigid's, Kells, 12/3/1972,
- Martry 4-7, 4-3 Moylagh, Kells, 12/3/1972,
- Enfield 1-13, 1-0 Kilallon, Trim, 12/3/1972,
- Oldcastle 2-5, 1-3 Kilmainhamwood, Kells, 12/3/1972,
- St. Peter's Dunboyne w, l Kilberry, Kilmessan, 12/3/1972,
- Martinstown 2-6, 0-11 Rathkenny, Pairc Tailteann, 19/3/1972,

Round 2:

- Rathkenny 2-4, 1-4 Kilallon, Kells, 26/3/1972,
- Castletown w, l Enfield, Kilmessan, 16/4/1972,
- Moylagh w, l Kilberry, Kells, 16/4/1972,
- St. Brigid's +4, -4 Kilmainhamwood, Kells, 23/4/1972,
- Martinstown 0-16, 0-7 Oldcastle, Martry, 30/4/1972,
- Martry 0-7, 0-2 St. Peter's Dunboyne, Kilmessan, 28/5/1972,

Round 3:

- Kilmainhamwood w, l Kilallon, Gibbstown, 16/4/1972,
- Martry 1-16, 0-7 Oldcastle, Kildalkey, 16/4/1972,
- Castletown 3-10, 0-3 Kilberry, Seneschalstown, 30/4/1972,
- Enfield 3-6, 1-3 Martinstown, Ballivor, 7/5/1972,
- St. Peter's Dunboyne 3-4, 2-5 Rathkenny, Skryne, 14/5/1972,
- Moylagh w, l St. Brigid's,

Round 4:

- Rathkenny v Kilmainhamwood, Castletown, 9/4/1972,
- Moylagh 3-10, 1-4 Kilallon, Kels, 30/4/1972,
- Enfield v St. Brigid's, Pairc Tailteann, 30/4/1972,
- Castletown 1-6, 0-7 Martry, Pairc Tailteann, 7/5/1972,
- Oldcastle w, l Kilberry,
- St. Peter's Dunboyne v Martinstown,

Round 5:

- Castletown 0-9, 0-5 Rathkenny, Kilberry, 23/4/1972,
- Oldcastle w, l Kilallon, Ballinlough, 28/5/1972,
- Moylagh w, l Enfield, Kildalkey, 9/7/1972,
- Martry w, l Martinstown, Kells, 23/7/1972,
- St. Brigid's w, l Kilberry,
- St. Peter's Dunboyne v Kilmainhamwood,

Round 6:

- Martry 2-5, 1-8 Kilmainhamwood, Gibbstown, 30/4/1972,
- St. Brigid's 2-10, 1-7 Oldcastle, Kells, 14/5/1972,
- Moylagh w, l Rathkenny, Kells, 4/6/1972,
- Castletown w, l Kilallon, Kells, 18/6/1972,
- Martinstown w, l Kilberry,
- Enfield v St. Peter's Dunboyne,

Round 7:

- Kilallon 1-11, 0-3 Kilberry, Kells, 7/5/1972,
- St. Brigid's v Rathkenny, Kells, 21/5/1972,
- Kilmainhamwood 3-9, 1-4 Martinstown, Gibbstown, 9/7/1972,
- Moylagh w, l St. Peter's Dunboyne, Pairc Tailteann, 23/7/1972,
- Castletown 2-8, 2-2 Oldcastle, Kells, 30/7/1972,
- Martry w, l Enfield,

Round 8:

- Moylagh 3-8, 1-3 Oldcastle, Ballinlough, 23/4/1972,
- St. Peter's Dunboyne 4-5, 0-10 St. Brigid's, Athboy, 9/7/1972,
- Castletown 1-14, 1-3 Kilmainhamwood, Gibbstown, 23/7/1972,
- Martry w, l Kilberry,
- Enfield v Rathkenny,
- Martinstown w, l Kilallon,

Round 9:

- Moylagh 1-12, 1-3 Martinstown, Kells, 14/5/1972,
- Martry w/o, scr Rathkenny, Kilberry, 6/8/1972,
- Castletown w, l St. Peter's Dunboyne,
- St. Brigid's w, l Kilallon,
- Kilmainhamwood w, l Kilberry,
- Enfield v Oldcastle,

Round 10:

- St. Peter's Dunboyne 1-7, 0-5 Oldcastle, Pairc Tailteann, 12/3/1972,
- St. Brigid's v Martinstown, Ballinlough, 16/4/1972,
- Kilmainhamwood +1, -1 Enfield, Pairc Tailteann, 28/5/1972,
- Martry w, l Kilallon, Kells, 9/7/1972,
- Castletown 1-4, 1-3 Moylagh, Kells, 27/8/1982,
- Rathkenny w, l Kilberry,

Round 11:

- Castletown w, l Martinstown, Kells, 4/6/1972,
- Martry 3-8, 1-6 St. Brigid's, Athboy, 4/6/1972,
- Moylagh 2-12, 0-5 Kilmainhamwood, Kells, 6/8/1972,
- Enfield w, l Kilberry,
- St. Peter's Dunboyne w, l Kilallon,
- Oldcastle v Rathkenny,

=== Group B ===
Team	Pld	W	L	D	PF	PA	PD	Pts
Bohermeen	10	8	0	2	0	0	+0	18
Summerhill	10	8	0	2	0	0	+0	18
Dunshaughlin	9	6	2	1	0	0	+0	13
Boardsmill	8	4	4	0	0	0	+0	8
Ratoath	8	4	4	0	0	0	+0	8
St. Mary's	8	3	4	1	0	0	+0	7
Garryowen	6	3	3	0	0	0	+0	6
Donaghmore	6	2	3	1	0	0	+0	5
Drumree	7	2	5	0	0	0	+0	4
Flathouse	8	1	6	1	0	0	+0	3
St. Colmcille's	10	0	10	0	0	0	+0	0

Round 1:

- Bohermeen w, l St. Colmcille's, Seneschalstown, 12/3/1972,
- Drumree 3-15, 4-5 Ratoath, Dunshaughlin, 19/3/1972,
- Dunshaughlin 1-9, 0-10 Donaghmore, Skryne, 19/3/1972,
- Summerhill 2-5, 2-5 St. Mary's, Skryne, 19/3/1972,
- Garryowen 2-6, 0-5 Flathouse, Trim, 26/3/1972,
- Boardsmill - Bye,

Round 2:

- Bohermeen 1-17, 1-0 St. Mary's, Duleek, 26/3/1972,
- Summerhill 4-14, 0-4 St. Colmcille's, Skryne, 7/5/1972,
- Ratoath 3-4, 2-6 Flathouse, Dunshaughlin, 28/5/1972,
- Dunshaughlin 2-7, 1-2 Drumree, Skryne, 28/5/1972,
- Donaghmore w, l Boardsmill, Dunshaughlin, 23/7/1972,
- Garryowen - Bye,

Round 3:

- Bohermeen w, l Flathouse, Skryne, 16/4/1972,
- Dunshaughlin w, l St. Colmcille's, Duleek, 16/4/1972,
- Boardsmill 2-3, 1-3 Ratoath, Pairc Tailteann, 14/5/1972,
- Summerhill 1-12, 0-5 Donaghmore, Dunshaughlin, 4/6/1972,
- Garryowen w, l Drumree, Skryne, 23/7/1972,
- St. Mary's - Bye,

Round 4:

- Dunshaughlin 1-13, 1-3 St. Mary's, Skryne, 7/5/1972,
- Bohermeen 1-5, 0-4 Garryowen, Pairc Tailteann, 7/5/1972,
- Summerhill 6-8, 1-2 Ratoath, Trim, 27/8/1972,
- Drumree v Donaghmore,
- Boardsmill v Flathouse,
- St. Colmcille's - Bye,

Round 5:

- St. Mary's w, l Garryowen, Seneschalstown, 9/4/1972,
- Donaghmore w, l St. Colmcille's, Ardcath, 23/4/1972,
- Summerhill 5-12, 2-5 Drumree, Kilcloon, 14/5/1972,
- Dunshaughlin w, l Flathouse, Kilmessan, 4/6/1972,
- Bohermeen w, l Boardsmill, Trim, 3/9/1972,
- Ratoath - Bye,

Round 6:

- Garryowen w, l St. Colmcille's, Duleek, 21/5/1972,
- Boardsmill 2-8, 1-6 St. Mary's, Kilmessan, 28/5/1972,
- Summerhill 4-10, 0-5 Flathouse, Dunshaughlin, 9/7/1972,
- Bohermeen w, l Drumree, Pairc Tailteann, 9/7/1972,
- Ratoath 2-6, 0-8 Dunshaughlin, Skryne, 23/7/1972,
- Donaghmore - Bye,

Round 7:

- Ratoath w, l St. Colmcille's, Donaghmore, 11/6/1972,
- Garryowen v Boardsmill, Athboy, 18/6/1972,
- Donaghmore d, d Flathouse, Skryne, 21/5/1972,
- Summerhill 2-7, 2-7 Bohermeen, Trim, 23/7/1972,
- St. Mary's v Drumree,
- Dunshaughlin - Bye,

Round 8:

- Bohermeen 3-6, 0-9 Donaghmore, Dunshaughlin, 30/4/1972,
- Dunshaughlin 3-11, 1-2 Boardsmill, Summerhill, 9/7/1972,
- Garryowen v Ratoath, Duleek, 16/7/1972,
- St. Mary's w, l St. Colmcille's, Duleek, 16/7/1972,
- Drumree v Flathouse,
- Summerhill - Bye,

Round 9:

- St. Mary's 3-5, 2-6 Flathouse, Skryne, 14/5/1972,
- Summerhill 4-7, 1-4 Garryowen, Trim, 28/5/1972,
- Bohermeen 1-9, 1-9 Dunshaughlin, Trim, 27/8/1972,
- Boardsmill w, l St. Colmcille's,
- Donaghmore v Ratoath,
- Drumree - Bye,

Round 10:

- Flathouse w, l St. Colmcille's, Seneschalstown, 9/4/1972,
- Garryowen v Donaghmore, Dunshaughlin, 16/4/1972,
- Boardsmill 4-12, 3-12 Drumree, Summerhill, 11/6/1972,
- Ratoath 1-13, 1-9 St. Mary's, Dunshaughlin, 6/8/1972,
- Summerhill 3-16, 1-8 Dunshaughlin, Trim, 3/9/1972,
- Bohermeen - Bye,

Round 11:

- Dunshaughlin v Garryowen, Pairc Tailteann, 30/4/1972,
- Donaghmore v St. Mary's, Stamullen, 18/6/1972,
- Summerhill w, l Boardsmill,
- Bohermeen w, l Ratoath,
- Drumree w, l St. Colmcille's,
- Flathouse - Bye,

== Knock-out Stages ==
The teams in the Quarter-Finals are the first and second placed teams from each group.

Semi-Finals
Martry	0-10
Bohermeen	1-5
Summerhill	2-6
Castletown	1-3

Final
Martry	2-4
Summerhill	3-7

Semi-Final:

- Summerhill 2-6, 1-3 Castletown, Pairc Tailteann, 17/9/1972,
- Martry 0-10, 1-5 Bohermeen, Kells, 17/9/1972,

Final:

- Summerhill 3-7, 2-4 Martry, Pairc Tailteann, 1/10/1972,
