= Tommy Cooke =

Irish hurler & Gaelic footballer (1914–2014)

Personal information
- Native name: Tomás Mac Dhabhóc (Irish)
- Born: 16 August 1914 Knockainey, County Limerick, Ireland
- Died: 13 February 2014 (aged 99) Caherconlish, County Limerick, Ireland
- Occupation: Farmer
- Height: 5 ft 10 in (178 cm)

Sport
- Sport: Hurling
- Position: Left wing-back
Club
- Years: Club
- Knockainey
Club titles
	Football	Hurling
Limerick titles	0	0
Inter-county
- Years: County
- 1939–1942: Limerick
Inter-county titles
- Munster titles: 1
- All-Irelands: 1
- NHL: 0

Thomas Francis Cooke (16 August 1914 – 13 February 2014) was an Irish hurler and Gaelic footballer who played as a left wing-back for the Limerick senior team.

Born in Knockainey, County Limerick, Cooke first played competitive hurling whilst at school in Warrenstown College. He made his first impression on the inter-county scene at the age of twenty-four when he joined the Limerick junior teams as a dual player. He made his senior debut during the 1939 Oireachtas Cup. Cooke went on to play a key role for Limerick for a short period, and won one All-Ireland medal, one Munster medal and one Oireachtas Cup medal.

At club level Cooke played both hurling and football with a number of local clubs including Knockainey, Knockane and Bulgaden.

== Playing career ==
=== Club ===
Cooke was instrumental in the foundation of the Knockainey club. He was appointed as the club's first treasurer in 1936.

Five years later in 1941 Cooke was captain of the team when Knockainey won the south junior hurling championship. It was the first silverware for the new club.

=== Inter-county ===
Cooke first came to prominence on the inter-county scene as a dual player in the junior grades in 1939. With the Limerick junior hurling team Cooke's side were defeated by Waterford on a score line of 4–2 to 2–4. An objection that was later upheld resulted in Limerick eventually being awarded the title and Cooke collecting a Munster medal. That same year he won a Munster medal in football as Limerick defeated Kerry by 1–7 to 1–2. Both Limerick teams were subsequently beaten in the All-Ireland semi-final stages.

By 1940 Cooke had joined the Limerick senior hurling team and lined out in his first provincial decider in the top grade. Cokr, the reigning champions, provided the opposition, however, the match ended in a draw. The replay was also a close affair, however, a 3–3 to 2–4 score line gave Limerick the win and gave Cooke a Munster medal. A subsequent defeat of Galway set up an All-Ireland showdown with Kilkenny. 50,0000 spectators travelled to Croke Park to witness the last great game between the two most outstanding teams of the decade. Early in the second-half Kilkenny took a four-point lead, however, once Mick Mackey was deployed at midfield he proceeded to dominate the game. Limerick hung on to win the game on a score line of 3–7 to 1–7 and Cooke collected an All-Ireland medal.

Cooke continued with Limerick for another few seasons, however, Cork went on to dominate the championship for the rest of the forties.

== Personal life ==
Born in Bottomstown, Knockainey, County Limerick, Cooke was born into a farming family. He was educated at Bulgaden national school before later boarding for a year at Rockwell College. After an unhappy time here, Cooke subsequently attended Warrenstown Agricultural College. On returning to Knockainey he became active in farming circles, and was a founder-member of the Golden Vale Marts Group. Cooke was married to Nan, the local national school teacher at Bottomstown, and the couple had three children.

Cooke died aged 99 at St. Michael's nursing home in Caherconlish on 13 February 2014. At the time of his death he was the oldest living senior All-Ireland medal winner, a mantle he had held since the death of Martin White in 2011.

== Honours ==
=== Player ===
Knockainey

- South Limerick Junior Hurling Championship (1): 1941

Limerick

- All-Ireland Senior Hurling Championship (1): 1940
- Munster Senior Hurling Championship (1): 1940
- Oireachtas Tournament (1): 1939
- Munster Junior Hurling Championship (1): 1939
- Munster Junior Football Championship (1): 1939

Achievements
Preceded by Martin White	Oldest living All-Ireland medal winner 2011-2014	Succeeded by John Coffey
