= 1970 Meath Intermediate Football Championship =

Meath I.F.C.
- Season: 1970
- Champions: Dunderry; 3rd Intermediate Football Championship title
- Relegated: None

The 1970 Meath Intermediate Football Championship is the 44th edition of the Meath GAA's premier club Gaelic football tournament for intermediate graded teams in County Meath, Ireland. The tournament consists of 22 teams. The championship starts with a group stage and then progresses to a knock out stage.

No team was relegated from the S.F.C. the previous year.

Martinstown and Star of the Sea were promoted after claiming the 1969 Meath Junior Football Championship title and Junior 'A' Divisional runners-up spot respectively. Garryowen were also promoted from the J.A.F.C.

On 29 November 1970, Dunderry claimed their 3rd Intermediate championship title when they defeated Flathouse 2-9 to 1-3 in the final in Pairc Tailteann, and thus returned the top flight of Meath club football.

== Team changes ==
The following teams have changed division since the 1969 championship season.

=== From I.F.C. ===
Promoted to S.F.C.

- Drumree - (Intermediate Champions)

Relegated to 1970 J.A.F.C.

- Athboy
- Longwood

=== To I.F.C. ===
Regraded from S.F.C.

- None

Promoted from 1969 J.A.F.C.

- Martinstown - (Junior Champions)
- Star of the Sea - (Junior 'A' Divisional Runners-Up)
- Garryowen

== Group stage ==
There are 2 groups called Group A and B. The top two finishers in each group will qualify for the Semi-Finals.

=== Group A ===
Team	Pld	W	L	D	PF	PA	PD	Pts
Flathouse	10	10	0	0	0	0	+0	20
Dunderry	10	9	1	0	0	0	+0	18
Bellewstown St. Theresa's	9	6	2	1	0	0	+0	13
Star of the Sea	9	5	4	0	0	0	+0	10
Garryowen	9	5	4	0	0	0	+0	10
Castletown	9	4	5	0	0	0	+0	8
St. Peter's Dunboyne	7	3	3	1	0	0	+0	7
Syddan	9	3	5	1	0	0	+0	7
St. Mary's	10	3	6	1	0	0	+0	4
Kilmainhamwood	10	1	9	0	0	0	+0	2
Rathkenny	10	0	10	0	0	0	+0	0

Round 1:

- Flathouse 2-5, 0-8 Dunderry, Skryne, 15/3/1970,
- Bellewstown w, l Kilmainhamwood, Kilberry, 15/3/1970,
- Syddan w, l Castletown, Kilberry, 15/3/1970,
- Garryowen w, l Rathkenny, Gibbstown, 15/3/1970,
- St. Peter's Dunboyne 3-4, 3-4 St. Mary's, Skryne, 15/3/1970,
- Star of the Sea - Bye,

Round 2:

- Dunderry 0-9, 1-5 Castletown, Kells, 22/3/1970,
- Star of the Sea w, l Garryowen, Duleek, 22/3/1970,
- Flathouse w, l Rathkenny, Skryne, 22/3/1970,
- St. Peter's Dunboyne w, l Kilmainhamwood, 22/3/1970,
- Bellewstown w, l St. Mary's, Seneschalstown, 22/3/1970,
- Syddan - Bye,

Round 3:

- Garryowen w, l Kilmainhamwood, Castletown, 5/4/1970,
- St. Peter's Dunboyne w, l Rathkenny, Skryne, 5/4/1970,
- Dunderry w, l Star of the Sea, Duleek, 5/4/1970,
- Flathouse w, l Syddan, Seneschalstown, 5/4/1970,
- Castletown w, l St. Mary's, Seneschalstown, 5/4/1970,
- Bellewstown - Bye,

Round 4:

- Flathouse w, l Garryowen, Duleek, 19/4/1970,
- St. Mary's w, l Syddan, Castletown, 19/4/1970,
- Bellewstown w, l Rathkenny, Seneschalstown, 3/5/1970,
- Dunderry w, l Kilmainhamwood, Gibbstown, 3/5/1970,
- Castletown w, l Star of the Sea, Skryne, 3/5/1970,
- St. Peter's Dunboyne - Bye,

Round 5:

- Flathouse w, l Kilmainhamwood, Seneschalstown, 10/5/1970,
- Syddan d, d Bellewstown, Seneschalstown, 10/5/1970,
- Star of the Sea w, l St. Mary's, Duleek, 10/5/1970,
- Garryowen w, l St. Peter's Dunboyne, Kilmessan, 28/6/1970,
- Castletown w/o, scr Rathkenny,
- Dunderry - Bye,

Round 6:

- St. Peter's Dunboyne w, l Syddan, Skryne, 3/5/1970,
- Bellewstown w, l Star of the Sea, ???, 17/5/1970,
- Flathouse w, l St. Mary's, Skryne, 17/5/1970,
- Castletown w, l Kilmainhamwood, Kilberry, 25/4/1970,
- Dunderry w/o, scr Rathkenny,
- Garryowen - Bye,

Round 7:

- Star of the Sea w, l Syddan, Kilberry, 24/5/1970,
- St. Mary's w, l Kilmainhamwood, Kilberry, 31/5/1970,
- Flathouse w, l Bellewstown, Dunshaughlin, 31/5/1970,
- Garryowen w, l Castletown, Gibbstown, 26/7/1970,
- Dunderry 1-7, 0-2 St. Peter's Dunboyne, Dunshaughlin, 25/10/1970,
- Rathkenny - Bye,

Round 8:

- Dunderry 1-21, 1-0 Syddan, Kilberry, 17/5/1970,
- Garryowen w, l St. Mary's, Seneschalstown, 24/5/1970,
- Flathouse w, l Castletown, Seneschalstown, 7/6/1970,
- Star of the Sea w/o, scr Rathkenny,
- St. Peter's Dunboyne v Bellewstown,
- Kilmainhamwood - Bye,

Round 9:

- Dunderry 2-11, 1-9 Garryowen, Skryne, 2/8/1970,
- Bellewstown w, l Castletown, Skryne, 16/8/1970,
- St. Mary's w/o, scr Rathkenny,
- Syddan w, l Kilmainhamwood,
- Star of the Sea v St. Peter's Dunboyne,
- Flathouse - Bye,

Round 10:

- Dunderry w, l Bellewstown, Seneschalstown, 20/7/1970,
- Flathouse w, l Star of the Sea, Skryne, 20/7/1970,
- Kilmainhamwood w/o, scr Rathkenny,
- Garryowen v Syddan,
- Castletown v St. Peter's Dunboyne,
- St. Mary's - Bye,

Round 11:

- Bellewstown w, l Garryowen, Skryne, 23/8/1970,
- Dunderry w/o, scr St. Mary's, Skryne, 4/10/1970,
- Flathouse w, l St. Peter's Dunboyne,
- Syddan w/o, scr Rathkenny,
- Star of the Sea w/o, scr Kilmainhamwood,
- Castletown - Bye,

=== Group B ===
Team	Pld	W	L	D	PF	PA	PD	Pts
Ballivor	10	9	0	1	0	0	+0	19
Martinstown	10	9	1	0	0	0	+0	18
Dunshaughlin	9	6	2	1	0	0	+0	13
Martry	10	6	4	0	0	0	+0	12
Bohermeen	9	5	4	0	0	0	+0	10
Kilallon	9	5	4	0	0	0	+0	10
Moylagh	9	5	4	0	0	0	+0	10
Summerhill	8	3	5	0	0	0	+0	6
Gibbstown	9	1	8	0	0	0	+0	2
Enfield	9	1	8	0	0	0	+0	2
Salesian College Warrenstown	10	0	10	0	0	0	+0	0

Round 1:

- Martinstown 0-7, 0-5 Enfield, Summerhill, 15/3/1970,
- Ballivor 1-8, 1-4 Summerhill, Trim, 15/3/1970,
- Martry 2-8, 1-3 Gibbstown, Kells, 15/3/1970,
- Moylagh w, l Bohermeen, Kells, 15/3/1970,
- Dunshaughlin w, l Warrenstown, Skryne, 19/4/1970,
- Kilallon - Bye,

Round 2:

- Martinstown 1-9, 1-4 Kilallon, Kells, 22/3/1970,
- Ballivor 2-6, 2-4 Enfield, Trim, 22/3/1970,
- Martry w, l Moylagh, Athboy, 22/3/1970,
- Bohermeen 3-7, 1-3 Gibbstown, Trim, 22/3/1970,
- Summerhill 4-6, 0-5 Warrenstown, Trim, 3/5/1970,
- Dunshaughlin - Bye,

Round 3:

- Martry 2-9, 0-6 Enfield, Trim, 5/4/1970,
- Kilallon w, l Summerhill, Athboy, 5/4/1970,
- Ballivor 2-6, 2-6 Dunshaughlin, Trim, 5/4/1970,
- Martinstown w, l Moylagh, Kells, 19/4/1970,
- Gibbstown w, l Warrenstown, Pairc Tailteann, 17/5/1970,
- Bohermeen - Bye,

Round 4:

- Bohermeen 1-13, 1-9 Enfield, Trim, 19/4/1970,
- Ballivor 1-5, 1-2 Martinstown, Trim, 3/5/1970,
- Dunshaughlin w, l Gibbstown, Seneschalstown, 19/4/1970,
- Kilallon w/o, scr Warrenstown, Kildalkey, 31/5/1970,
- Moylagh 2-8, 1-7 Summerhill, Athboy, 12/7/1970,
- Martry - Bye,

Round 5:

- Dunshaughlin w, l Bohermeen, Skryne, 10/5/1970,
- Martinstown 0-11, 1-5 Martry, Kells, 17/5/1970,
- Kilallon w, l Gibbstown, Athboy, 28/6/1970,
- Ballivor w, l Moylagh, Kildalkey, 30/8/1970,
- Enfield w/o, scr Warrenstown,
- Summerhill - Bye,

Round 6:

- Martry w, l Dunshaughlin, Pairc Tailteann, 26/7/1970,
- Summerhill w, l Enfield, Kildalkey, 26/7/1970,
- Moylagh w/o, scr Warrenstown,
- Ballivor w, l Gibbstown,
- Bohermeen w, l Kilallon,
- Martinstown - Bye,

Round 7:

- Moylagh w, l Gibbstown, Athboy, 24/5/1970,
- Ballivor 1-13, 2-2 Bohermeen, Athboy, 31/5/1970,
- Martry w, l Summerhill, Kilmessan, 16/8/1970,
- Dunshaughlin 2-13, 1-6 Kilallon, Kildalkey, 23/8/1970,
- Martinstown w/o, scr Warrenstown,
- Enfield - Bye,

Round 8:

- Bohermeen 1-8, 1-4 Martry, Pairc Tailteann, 28/6/1970,
- Kilallon w, l Enfield, Kildalkey, 30/8/1970,
- Martinstown w, l Gibbstown,
- Ballivor w/o, scr Warrenstown,
- Dunshaughlin v Summerhill,
- Moylagh - Bye,

Round 9:

- Dunshaughlin 2-7, 0-10 Moylagh, Kells, 2/8/1970,
- Kilallon 5-6, 4-8 Martry, Kildalkey, 13/9/1970,
- Martinstown 0-10, 1-6 Summerhill, Kildalkey, 4/10/1970,
- Bohermeen w/o, scr Warrenstown,
- Gibbstown v Enfield,
- Ballivor - Bye,

Round 10:

- Martinstown 0-15, 2-4 Dunshaughlin, Trim, 30/8/1970,
- Ballivor 4-6, 0-5 Kilallon, Kells, 25/10/1970,
- Moylagh w, l Enfield,
- Martry w/o, scr Warrenstown,
- Summerhill v Bohermeen,
- Gibbstown - Bye,

Round 11:

- Ballivor 2-10, 2-6 Martry, Athboy, 23/8/1970,
- Martinstown 1-6, 0-6 Bohermeen, Kells, 25/10/1970,
- Moylagh v Kilallon, Kells, 20/9/1970,
- Dunshaughlin w, l Enfield,
- Summerhill w, l Gibbstown,
- Warrenstown - Bye,

== Knock-out Stages ==
The teams in the Semi-Finals are the first and second placed teams from each group.

Semi-Finals
Flathouse	+5
Martinstown	-5
Ballivor	0-10
Dunderry	2-6

Final
Dunderry	2-9
Flathouse	1-3

Semi-Final:

- Flathouse +5, -5 Martinstown, Pairc Tailteann, 8/11/1970,
- Dunderry 2-6, 0-10 Ballivor, Pairc Tailteann, 15/11/1970,

Final:

- Dunderry 2-9, 1-3 Flathouse, Pairc Tailteann, 29/11/1970,
