= 1971 Meath Intermediate Football Championship =

Meath I.F.C.
- Season: 1971
- Champions: Ballivor; 2nd Intermediate Football Championship title
- Relegated: Ballinabrackey; Bellewstown St. Theresa's; Cortown; Salesian College Warrenstown

The 1971 Meath Intermediate Football Championship is the 45th edition of the Meath GAA's premier club Gaelic football tournament for intermediate graded teams in County Meath, Ireland. The tournament consists of 24 teams. The championship starts with a group stage and then progresses to a knockout stage.

Oldcastle were relegated from the S.F.C. the previous year.

This year marked St. Colmcille's first year as a club, as the Intermediate club Star of the Sea and the Junior club Shallon amalgamated in early1971.

Ratoath and Cortown were promoted after claiming the 1970 Meath Junior Football Championship title and Junior 'A' Divisional runners-up spot, respectively. This was only Cortown's second season after it was formed in 1969. Kilberry was also promoted from the J.A.F.C.

On 24 October 1971, Ballivor claimed their 2nd Intermediate championship title when they defeated Moylagh 3-2 to 1-5 in the final in Pairc Tailteann, and thus returned to the top flight of Meath club football.

Ballinabrackey, Bellewstown St. Theresa's, and Cortown were relegated to the 1972 J.F.C. Salesian College, Warrenstown also stopped fielding teams in the Meath football championships at the end of the year.

== Team changes ==
The following teams have changed divisions since the 1970 championship season.

=== From I.F.C. ===
Promoted to S.F.C.

- Dunderry - (Intermediate Champions)
- Syddan

Relegated to 1971 J.A.F.C.

- None

=== To I.F.C. ===
Regraded from S.F.C.

- Oldcastle

Promoted from 1970 J.A.F.C.

- Ratoath - (Junior Champions)
- Cortown - (Junior 'A' Divisional Runners-Up)
- Kilberry

== Group stage ==
There are 2 groups called Group A and B. The top two finishers in each group will qualify for the Semi-Finals.

=== Group A ===
Team	Pld	W	L	D	PF	PA	PD	Pts
Flathouse	11	11	0	0	0	0	+0	22
Castletown	11	9	1	1	0	0	+0	19
Rathkenny	11	9	1	1	0	0	+0	19
Kilmainhamwood	6	3	3	0	0	0	+0	6
Ratoath	6	3	3	0	0	0	+0	6
Cortown	8	2	6	0	0	0	+0	4
Garryowen	7	2	5	0	0	0	+0	4
Oldcastle	7	2	5	0	0	0	+0	4
St. Colmcille's	5	2	3	0	0	0	+0	4
Bellewstown St. Theresa's	5	1	4	0	0	0	+0	2
St. Mary's	4	0	4	0	0	0	+0	0
Salesian College Warrenstown	11	0	11	0	0	0	+0	0

Round 1:

- Castletown 0-9, 0-5 St. Mary's, Seneschalstown, 14/3/1971,
- Cortown 0-6, 0-5 Oldcastle, Kells, 14/3/1971,
- Kilmainhamwood 2-9, 1-2 Warrenstown, Kells, 14/3/1971,
- Ratoath +5, -5 Garryowen, Seneschalstown, 14/3/1971,
- Flathouse 1-7, 1-4 Bellewstown, Dunshaughlin, 14/3/1971,
- Rathkenny w, l St. Colmcille's, Duleek, 21/3/1971,

Round 2:

- Kilmainhamwood w, l Garryowen, Kells, 28/3/1971,
- St. Mary's v Bellewstown, Duleek, 28/3/1971,
- Ratoath w, l Warrenstown, ???, 28/3/1971,
- Oldcastle v St. Colmcille's, Kilberry, 28/3/1971,
- Flathouse w, l Cortown, Pairc Tailteann, 28/3/1971,
- Castletown 0-7, 1-4 Rathkenny, Kells, 22/8/1971,

Round 3:

- Oldcastle v Garryowen, Kells, 4/4/1971,
- St. Colmcille's v Bellewstown, Duleek, 4/4/1971,
- Flathouse w, l Kilmainhamwood, Seneschalstown, 4/4/1971,
- Rathkenny w, l Cortown, Gibbstown, 18/4/1971,
- Castletown 0-6, 0-4 Ratoath, Duleek, 23/5/1971,
- Warrenstown w, l St. Mary's,

Round 4:

- Oldcastle 1-5, 0-4 Bellewstown, Kilberry, 18/4/1971,
- Castletown 2-6, 2-3 Kilmainhamwood, Gibbstown, 18/4/1971,
- Garryowen 2-8, 3-1 Cortown, Kells, 9/5/1971,
- Rathkenny w, l St. Mary's, Seneschalstown, 9/5/1971,
- Flathouse w, l Ratoath, Dunshaughlin, 6/6/1971,
- St. Colmcille's w, l Warrenstown,

Round 5:

- Flathouse w, l St. Colmcille's, Seneschalstown, 18/4/1971,
- Castletown 5-12, 1-10 Oldcastle, Kells, 9/5/1971,
- Kilmainhamwood v Cortown, Kells, 16/5/1971,
- Garryowen v Bellewstown, Dunshaughlin, 16/5/1971,
- Ratoath v St. Mary's, Duleek, 13/6/1971,
- Rathkenny w, l Warrenstown,

Round 6:

- Castletown w, l St. Colmcille's, Seneschalstown, 16/5/1971,
- Flathouse w, l St. Mary's, Seneschalstown, 16/5/1971,
- Rathkenny w, l Garryowen, Pairc Tailteann, 23/5/1971,
- Kilmainhamwood 2-9, 1-5 Bellewstown, Kilberry, 23/5/1971,
- Ratoath 2-6, 1-8 Cortown, Seneschalstown, 4/7/1971,
- Oldcastle w, l Warrenstown,

Round 7:

- Ratoath v St. Colmcille's, Seneschalstown, 9/5/1971,
- Oldcastle v St. Mary's, Kilberry, 23/5/1971,
- Cortown v Bellewstown, Castletown, 6/6/1971,
- Flathouse w, l Castletown, Pairc Tailteann, 20/6/1971,
- Rathkenny w, l Kilmainhamwood,
- Garryowen w, l Warrenstown,

Round 8:

- St. Colmcille's 2-7, 2-6 Cortown, Kilmessan, 23/5/1971,
- Rathkenny w, l Oldcastle, Kells, 6/6/1971,
- Garryowen v St. Mary's, Castletown, 6/6/1971,
- Castletown w, l Bellestown, Seneschalstown, 4/7/1971,
- Flathouse w, l Warrenstown,
- Kilmainhamwood v Ratoath,

Round 9:

- St. Mary's v St. Colmcille's, Seneschalstown, 20/6/1971,
- Flathouse 0-6, 0-5 Rathkenny, Kilmessan, 4/7/1971,
- Rathkenny w, l Oldcastle, Ballinlough, 4/7/1971,
- Castletown 1-11, 0-6 Garryowen, Pairc Tailteann, 11/7/1971,
- Ratoath v Bellewstown,
- Cortown w, l Warrenstown,

Round 10:

- Rathkenny w, l Bellewstown, Duleek, 13/6/1971,
- Flathouse w, l Garryowen, Dunshaughlin, 11/7/1971,
- Kilmainhamwood v St. Colmcille's, Kilberry, 11/7/1971,
- Cortown v St. Mary's, Kilberry, 11/7/1971,
- Oldcastle v Ratoath, Trim, 12/9/1971,
- Castletown w, l Warrenstown,

Round 11:

- Garryowen v St. Colmcille's, Seneschalstown, 13/6/1971,
- Flathouse 2-9, 0-4 Oldcastle, Pairc Tailteann, 11/7/1971,
- Kilmainhamwood v St. Mary's,
- Castletown w, l Cortown,
- Bellewstown w, l Warrenstown,
- Rathkenny w, l Ratoath,

- Many results are unavailable.

=== Group B ===
Team	Pld	W	L	D	PF	PA	PD	Pts
Moylagh	11	10	1	0	0	0	+0	20
Ballivor	11	9	2	0	0	0	+0	18
St. Peter's Dunboyne	9	7	2	0	0	0	+0	14
Summerhill	8	6	2	0	0	0	+0	12
Kilallon	8	5	3	0	0	0	+0	10
Dunshaughlin	5	3	2	0	0	0	+0	6
Martry	6	3	3	0	0	0	+0	6
Ballinabrackey	8	2	6	0	0	0	+0	4
Bohermeen	7	2	5	0	0	0	+0	4
Martinstown	8	2	6	0	0	0	+0	4
Enfield	7	1	6	0	0	0	+0	2
Kilberry	11	0	11	0	0	0	+0	0

Round 1:

- Kilallon 0-13, 0-6 Ballinabrackey, Trim, 14/3/1971,
- St. Peter's Dunboyne 2-6, 0-5 Kilberry, Dunshaughlin, 14/3/1971,
- Moylagh w, l Dunshaughlin, Kildalkey, 29/3/1971,
- Bohermeen w, l Martinstown, Kildalkey, 29/3/1971,
- Ballivor 3-12, 0-9 Enfield, Summerhill, 29/3/1971,
- Martry v Summerhill,

Round 2:

- Kilallon 0-11, 0-7 Kilberry, Kells, 28/3/1971,
- Dunshaughlin v Enfield, Summerhill, 4/4/1971,
- Ballinabrackey +2, -2 Martinstown, Trim, 25/4/1971,
- St. Peter's Dunboyne +1, -1 Martry, Pairc Tailteann, 25/4/1971,
- Ballivor 1-10, 3-3 Moylagh, Athboy, 9/5/1971,
- Summerhill 3-7, 0-11 Bohermeen, Kilmessan, 9/5/1971,

Round 3:

- Dunshaughlin 2-10, 2-1 Kilallon, Trim, 9/5/1971,
- Martry 1-7, 1-5 Martinstown, Kildalkey, 9/5/1971,
- Ballinabrackey v Enfield, Longwood, 16/5/1971,
- Summerhill 1-9, 0-9 Ballivor, Athboy, 23/5/1971,
- Bohermeen 2-8, 0-3 Kilberry, Gibbstown, 23/5/1971,
- Moylagh 3-12, 0-6 St. Peter's Dunboyne, Kildalkey, 23/5/1971,

Round 4:

- Moylagh w, l Ballinabrackey, Kildalkey, 30/5/1971,
- St. Peter's Dunboyne 2-10, 1-10 Enfield, Kilcloon, 9/5/1971,
- Bohermeen v Dunshaughlin, Pairc Tailteann, 16/5/1971,
- Ballivor +1, -1 Martry, Athboy, 6/6/1971
- Summerhill 3-9, 0-3 Kilberry, Trim, 6/6/1971,
- Martinstown v Kilallon, Kildalkey, 19/9/1971,

Round 5:

- Kilallon 2-11, 1-4 Enfield, Kildalkey, 6/6/1971,
- Moylagh 5-5, 2-8 Martry, Athboy, 20/6/1971,
- St. Peter's Dunboyne 4-6, 2-6 Bohermeen, Summerhill, 4/7/1971,
- Ballivor w/o, scr Kilberry, Kells, 22/8/1971,
- Dunshaughlin v Martinstown,
- Summerhill w, l Ballinabrackey,

Round 6:

- Martry 2-9, 2-7 Enfield, Kildalkey, 23/5/1971,
- St. Peter's Dunboyne w, l Kilallon, Trim, 12/9/1971,
- Moylagh w, l Kilberry,
- Bohermeen v Ballinabrackey,
- Summerhill v Dunshaughlin
- Martinstown w, l Ballivor,

Round 7:

- Moylagh w, l Martinstown, Ballinlough, 16/5/1971,
- Kilallon 1-6, 1-5 Summerhill, Trim, 4/7/1971,
- Ballivor 4-6, 0-4 Dunshaughlin, Trim, 4/7/1971,
- Martry w, l Kilberry,
- Bohermeen v Enfield,
- St. Peter's Dunboyne w, l Ballinabrackey,

Round 8:

- Ballinabrackey w, l Kilberry, Summerhill, 9/5/1971,
- Ballivor w, l Killalon, Athboy, 15/8/1971,
- Martry v Bohermeen, Kells, 15/8/1971,
- Summerhill w, l Martinstown,
- St. Peter's Dunboyne v Dunshaughlin,
- Moylagh w, l Enfield,

Round 9:

- Enfield w, l Kilberry, Kilmessan, 20/6/1971,
- Kilallon 2-12, 1-3 Bohermeen, Athboy, 11/7/1971,
- Moylagh w, l Summerhill, Athboy, 15/8/1971,
- Ballivor w, l Ballinabrackey,
- Dunshaughlin v Martry,
- St. Peter's Dunboyne w, l Martinstown,

Round 10:

- Dunshaughlin 2-9, 0-5 Ballinabrackey, Trim, 23/5/1971,
- Moylagh w, l Bohermeen, Kells, 13/6/1971,
- Martry v Kilallon, Athboy, 29/8/1971,
- Ballivor 2-15, 0-4 St. Peter's Dunboyne, Trim, 29/8/1971,
- Summerhill w, l Enfield,
- Martinstown w, l Kilberry,

Round 11:

- Dunshaughlin w, l Kilberry, Kilmessan, 18/7/1971,
- Moylagh w, l Kilallon, Kells, 18/7/1971,
- Summerhill v St. Peter's Dunboyne, Athboy, 18/7/1971,
- Ballivor 3-14, 1-9 Bohermeen, Kildalkey, 12/9/1971,
- Enfield v Martinstown,
- Martry v Ballinabrackey,

- Not all results available

== Knock-out Stages ==
The teams in the Semi-Finals are the first and second placed teams from each group.

Semi-Finals
Flathouse	1-4
Ballivor	1-12
Moylagh	1-9
Castletown	0-9

Final
Ballivor	3-2 R
Moylagh	1-5

Semi-Final:

- Ballivor 1-12, 1-4 Flathouse, Kilmessan, 19/9/1971,
- Moylagh 1-9, 0-9 Castletown, Kells, 19/9/1971,

Final & Final Replay:

- Ballivor 0-11, 1-8 Moylagh, Pairc Tailteann, 3/10/1971,
- Ballivor 3-2, 1-5 Moylagh, Pairc Tailteann, 24/10/1971,
