= Teagasc =

Irish government agri-food agency

Teagasc (Irish pronunciation: [ˈtʲaɡəsˠk], meaning Instruction) is the semi-state authority in Ireland responsible for research and development, training and advisory services in the agri-food sector.

The official title of the body is Teagasc – the Agriculture and Food Development Authority. In 1988, Teagasc was formed as an amalgamation of two preceding bodies - An Foras Talúntais (AFT) / The Agricultural Institute, which was responsible for agricultural research, and An Chomhairle Oiliúna Talmhaíochta (ACOT) / The Agricultural Training Council, which was responsible for education and advisory services.

== History ==
An Foras Talúntais was established on 23 May 1958, with Dr. Tom Walsh acting as its first director. Walsh had established the National Soil Testing Service and Research Centre at Johnstown Castle, Wexford in 1948, and eventually established all the main Teagasc research centres which exist today. Walsh also served as the first director of An Chomhairle Oiliúna Talmhaíochta. The two organisations, as well as "the local committees of agriculture", were dissolved on 8 September 1988 to form Teagasc.

== Teagasc colleges and research centres ==
The authority has a number of county advisory centres, colleges and research centres in which it carries out its main business. The Teagasc headquarters are located in the Oak Park Estate in Carlow.

=== Teagasc agricultural and horticultural colleges ===
- Clonakilty Agricultural College
- Kildalton Agricultural and Horticultural College
- Ballyhaise Agricultural College
- College of Amenity Horticulture located at the Botanic Gardens, Glasnevin, Dublin.
- Teagasc eCollege

=== Private agricultural and horticultural colleges ===
- Gurteen Agricultural College
- Mountbellew Agricultural College
- Warrenstown Horticultural College (closed in 2009)
- Pallaskenry Agricultural College

=== Food research centres ===
- Moorepark Food Research Centre, Fermoy, Co Cork. (functional foods, dairy, food ingredients and formulated foods and beverages)
- Ashtown Food Research Centre (food product innovation, quality and safety, meat science, bioactives, nutraceuticals, bakery technology, seafood innovation, horticulture including plant diagnostics and forestry)

=== Agricultural research centres ===
- Animal Bioscience Research Centre (efficiency of production of high-quality meat and milk)
- Athenry Production Research Centre (sheep production, animal reproduction, organic milk, beef and sheep production)
- Grange Research Centre (beef)
- Johnstown Research Centre (soil, environment and organic farming)
- Kinsealy Research Centre (formerly horticulture; since closed, with facilities relocated to Ashtown, Dublin 15, in 2012)
- Moorepark Research Centre (dairy and pigs)
- Oak Park Research Centre (arable crop)
- Rural Economy Research Centre (social science research and policy)

== See also ==
- State agencies of the Republic of Ireland
