= 1972 Meath Senior Football Championship =

Meath S.F.C.
- Season: 1972
- Champions: Seneschalstown; 1st Senior Championship Title
- Relegated: St. Vincent's
- Leinster SCFC: Seneschalstown (preliminary round) St. Mary's Ardee w, l Seneschalstown
- All Ireland SCFC: n/a
- Winning Captain: Mickey Collins (Seneschalstown)
- Matches: 40

The 1972 Meath Senior Football Championship is the 80th edition of the Meath GAA's premier club Gaelic football tournament for senior graded teams in County Meath, Ireland. The tournament consists of 15 teams, with the winner going on to represent Meath in the Leinster Senior Club Football Championship. The championship starts with a group stage and then progresses to a knock out stage.

This season saw Ballivor's return to the top flight after claiming the 1971 Meath Intermediate Football Championship title..

Kilbride were the defending champions after they defeated Skryne in the previous years final after a replay, however this season relinquished their crown which they held for 3 consecutive years when failing to progress past the Group stage.

St. Vincent's applied to be regraded to the 1973 I.F.C. at the end of the campaign.

On 5 November 1972, Seneschalstown won their first Meath S.F.C. title when they defeated Navan O'Mahonys 0-11 to 1-5 in the final replay in Pairc Tailteann. Mickey Collins raised the Keegan Cup for the Furze men.

== Team changes ==
The following teams have changed division since the 1971 championship season.

=== To S.F.C. ===
Promoted from I.F.C.

- Ballivor - (Intermediate Champions).

=== From S.F.C. ===
Regraded to I.F.C.

- Drumree

== Group stage ==
=== Group A ===
Team	Pld	W	L	D	PF	PA	PD	Pts
Seneschalstown	7	6	1	0	0	0	+0	12
Navan O'Mahonys	7	5	1	1	0	0	+0	11
Trim	7	5	1	1	0	0	+0	11
Gaeil Colmcille	6	3	1	2	0	0	+0	7
Dunderry	6	3	3	0	0	0	+0	6
Slane	6	1	5	0	0	0	+0	2
Duleek	5	0	4	1	0	0	+0	1
St. Patrick's	6	0	6	0	0	0	+0	0

Round 1:

- Slane w, l St. Patrick's, Duleek, 9/4/1972,
- Gaeil Colmcille d, d Duleek, Kilberry, 9/4/1972,
- Seneschalstown 2-10, 2-7 Dunderry, Pairc Tailteann, 16/4/1972,
- Navan O'Mahonys 0-7, 1-4 Trim, Trim, 7/5/1972,

Round 2:

- Seneschalstown w, l Slane, Duleek, 23/4/1972,
- Dunderry 1-9, 1-7 St. Patrick's, Duleek, 30/4/1972,
- Navan O'Mahonys w, l Duleek, Seneschalstown, 28/5/1972,
- Gaeil Colmcille 3-6, 0-14 Trim, Pairc Tailteann, 2/7/1972,

Round 3:

- Seneschalstown w, l St. Patrick's, Duleek, 21/5/1972,
- Dunderry w, l Slane, Seneschalstown, 28/5/1972,
- Trim 2-11, 2-4 Duleek, Pairc Tailteann, 9/7/1972,
- Navan O'Mahonys 0-11, 1-3 Gaeil Colmcille, Martry, 9/7/1972,

Round 4:

- Navan O'Mahonys w, l St. Patrick's, ???, 23/7/1972,
- Seneschalstown 1-17, 0-2 Duleek, Skryne, 23/7/1972,
- Trim 2-8, 0-12 Dunderry, Pairc Tailteann, 23/7/1972,
- Gaeil Colmcille 4-10, 1-6 Slane, Kilberry, 23/7/1972,

Round 5:

- Seneschalstown 0-10, 0-7 Gaeil Colmcille, Martry, 30/7/1972,
- Navan O'Mahonys 0-11, 1-6 Dunderry, Kells, 6/8/1972,
- St. Patrick's v Duleek, Ardcath, 30/7/1973,
- Trim w, l Slane,

Round 6:

- Trim 2-6, 1-7 Seneschalstown, Pairc Tailteann, 27/8/1972,
- Navan O'Mahonys w, l Slane,
- Dunderry w, l Duleek,
- Gaeil Colmcille w, l St. Patrick's,

Round 7:

- Seneschalstown 0-12, 0-8 Navan O'Mahonys, Kells, 3/9/1972,
- Trim w, l St. Patrick's,
- Slane v Duleek,
- Gaeil Colmcille v Dunderry,

Semi-final playoff:

- Navan O'Mahonys 2-7, 0-9 Trim, Pairc Tailteann, 1/10/1972,

=== Group B ===
Team	Pld	W	L	D	PF	PA	PD	Pts
Ballivor	6	6	0	0	0	0	+0	12
Skryne	6	4	1	1	0	0	+0	9
Walterstown	6	4	2	0	0	0	+0	8
Kilbride	6	3	2	1	0	0	+0	7
Ballinlough	6	2	4	0	0	0	+0	4
Syddan	6	1	4	1	0	0	+0	3
St. Vincent's	6	0	5	1	0	0	+0	1

Round 1:

- Syddan d, d St. Vincent's, Pairc Tailteann, 9/4/1972,
- Ballinlough 1-10, 0-7 Kilbride, Pairc Tailteann, 16/4/1972,
- Ballivor w, l Walterstown, Dunshaughlin, 16/4/1972,
- Skryne - Bye,

Round 2:

- Walterstown 2-14, 0-7 Syddan, Kilberry, 30/4/1972,
- Ballivor w, l St. Vincent's, Dunshaughlin, 30/4/1972,
- Skryne 0-9, 2-3 Kilbride, Dunshaughlin, 7/5/1972,
- Ballinlough - Bye,

Round 3:

- Walterstown 7-10, 0-8 St. Vincent's, Skryne, 21/4/1972,
- Skryne 2-9, 0-2 Ballinlough, Kells, 28/5/1972,
- Ballivor 3-1, 1-4 Syddan, Kells, 28/5/1972,
- Kilbride - Bye,

Round 4:

- Kilbride w, l St. Vincent's, Stamullen, 4/6/1972,
- Walterstown 2-14, 0-10 Ballinlough, Pairc Tailteann, 18/6/1972,
- Skryne w, l Syddan, Kilberry, 9/7/1972,
- Ballivor - Bye,

Round 5:

- Ballivor 2-6, 1-6 Kilbride, Trim, 9/7/1972,
- Skryne w/o, scr St. Vincent's, Duleek, 23/7/1972,
- Syddan 2-6, 0-4 Ballinlough, Gibbstown, 13/8/1972,
- Walterstown - Bye,

Round 6:

- Walterstown 2-16, 3-3 Kilbride, Dunshaughlin, 30/7/1972,
- Ballivor 2-4, 1-6 Skryne, Trim, 6/8/1972,
- Ballinlough w/o, scr St. Vincent's,
- Syddan - Bye,

Round 7:

- Skryne 2-7, 0-9 Walterstown, Pairc Tailteann, 3/9/1972,
- Kilbride w, l Syddan,
- Ballivor w, l Ballinlough,
- St. Vincent's - Bye,

== Knock-out Stages ==
The winners and runners up of each group qualify for the semi-finals.

Semi-finals
1	Ballivor	0-10
4	Navan O'Mahonys	1-9
3	Seneschalstown	3-7
2	Skryne	1-8

Final
Seneschalstown	0-11 R
Navan O'Mahonys	1-5 R

Semi-finals:

- Seneschalstown 3-7, 1-8 Skryne, Pairc Tailteann, 1/10/1972,
- Navan O'Mahonys 1-9, 0-10 Ballivor, Trim, 8/10/1972,

Final & final Replay:

- Seneschalstown 0-9, 1-6 Navan O'Mahonys, Pairc Tailteann, 22/10/1972,
- Seneschalstown 0-11, 1-5 Navan O'Mahonys, Pairc Tailteann, 5/11/1972,

== Leinster Senior Club Football Championship ==
Preliminary round:

- St. Mary's Ardee w, l Seneschalstown,
