= Pallaskenry =

Village in County Limerick, Ireland

Pallaskenry Pailís Chaonraí
- Village
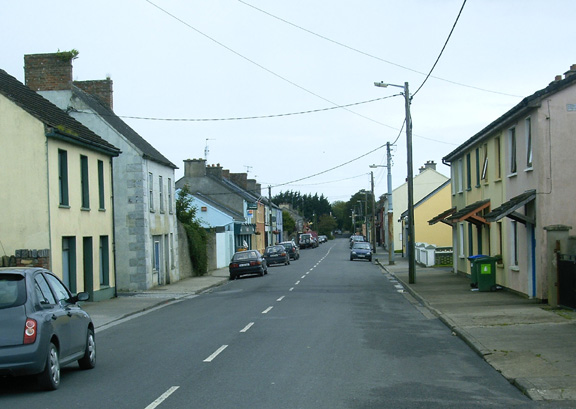
- Main Street

- Location in Ireland
- Coordinates: 52°38′40″N 08°52′03″W
- Country: Ireland
- Province: Munster
- County: County Limerick

Population (2022)
  - Total: 610
- Time zone: UTC+0 (WET)
  - Summer (DST): UTC-1 (IST (WEST))

Pallaskenry (Irish: Pailís Chaonraí, meaning 'the palisade of Caonraí') is a village in County Limerick, Ireland.

The village is located about 24 km (15 mi) west of Limerick city, close to the River Shannon estuary. The town is reached by travelling about five kilometres (~3 miles) north off the N69 National Route that runs west from the city. Pallaskenry is a satellite town of Limerick city, many of its inhabitants work in the city but many also work in Shannon Town, County Clare (north across the estuary), and Askeaton, a town further west of Pallaskenry.

== History and name ==
Pallaskenry derives its name from Kenry Castle (the palisaded castle of Kenry), nowadays known as Shanpallas Castle. It was one of the principal ancient castles of County Limerick. Kenry Castle was the original property of Russells as part of the territories or Ardcanny and Chapelrussell (incl. Pallas itself) which was acquired by the first Knight of Glin, Sir John fitz John. It was later in the possession of Henry Fitzgerald, grandson of the first Knight in 1330 and served as an important sub-manor of the Earls of Desmond right through to 1652.

There are several castles in the area, including Cullam Castle, Ballyculhane Castle, Shanpallas Castle (previously called Kenry Castle) and Dromore Castle. Dromore Castle is unusual in that it was built late in the 19th century (1866-73) in the style of a fairytale or romantic castle. Dormore castle was the work of the progressive English architect-designer Edward William Godwin.

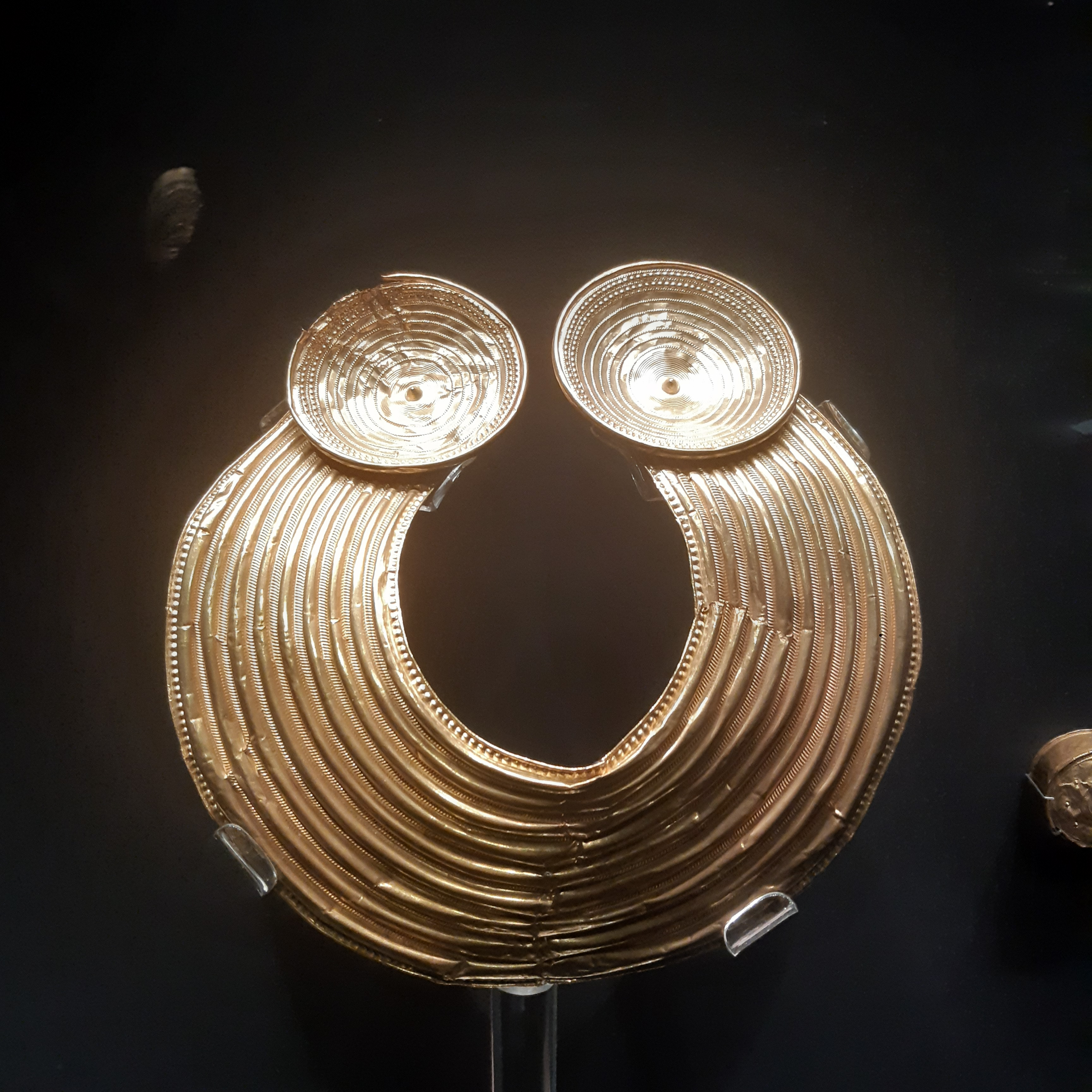
Shannongrove Collar in the Victoria and Albert Museum

There have been a number of archaeological finds in the area, including the Shannongrove Collar, which was found at a depth of 12 feet in a bog on lands granted to Phineas Bury during Cromwellian plantations. A bone crucifix was found in the 1950s at Dog's Island, the boggy ground between Dromore Lake and a very small lake east of it. A carved early-medieval head was found at Kenry Castle.

== Amenities ==
On the main street in Pallaskenry, there is a Chinese restaurant and takeaway, a chip shop, hairdressers,barber, one pub and two local shops. There is also a funeral home, a 150-year-old church and a post office.

Pallaskenry has a primary school (St. Mary's) with 168 pupils, a secondary school (Salesian Secondary College, formerly Copsewood College, with approximately 702 students), and a pre-school (Kiddies Corner) in the community centre. Copsewood is also home to Pallaskenry Agricultural College. Author Darren Shan attended Copsewood College and has lived close to the village most of his life.

== Sport ==
Pallaskenry GAA Club is one of the oldest GAA clubs in Limerick, founded in 1906.

== Demographics ==
In the 2022 census, Pallaskenry had a population of 610, a decrease from 651 at the 2016 census. The population in the 2011 census was 664. This had increased from 469 in 1991.

== See also ==
- List of towns and villages in Ireland
