= Salesian Secondary College =

Location
- Copsewood, Pallaskenry; County Limerick; Ireland; 52.6475°N 8.8575°W

Information
- Type: Secondary school
- Enrollment: 711 (2024)
- Team name: Gaels
- Website: salesiancollege.ie

Salesian Secondary College, formerly Copsewood College, is a secondary school located outside the village of Pallaskenry, County Limerick, Ireland. The school campus is owned by the Salesians and shared with Pallaskenry Agricultural College. As of 2024, there were over 700 students enrolled in the school's co-educational program.

The school's webpage describes its mission as providing an education based on Catholic values while incorporating the characteristics of Salesian Education. The basis of that pedagogy is the Salesian Preventive System, which is based on the experience of the 19th-century Saint John Bosco.

== Curriculum ==
Salesian Secondary College's curriculum comprises six-year post-primary education, with a three-year junior cycle to the Junior Certificate and a three-year senior cycle to the Leaving Certificate.

== History and facilities ==
According to local tradition, Copsewood was named in the 19th century for Fr. Michael Copps, who lived in the house. The Salesians first took possession of Copsewood House in 1919. The boys-only missionary school opened in 1920 with 100 students, 80 of them boarders. The Agricultural School opened the same year. In 1948, the missionary school was recognised by the Department of Education as a secondary school and began to receive government funding for teacher salaries. The school opened to day-pupils. By 1957, missionary students had been phased out. The diocese permitted the school to become a secondary school, without missionary programs, to serve as a feeder school for the Agricultural College. The school offered subjects such as technical drawing, woodwork, metalwork, physics, chemistry, botany, and economics which were not then common in many schools at that time and were seen as an important grounding for agricultural students. From this came the development of the school's well-equipped science labs in the 1950s and 1960s. Boarding was phased out and ended in 1995, with the dormitory space converted into classrooms. The secondary school is now recognized as a regional leader in information technology. In 1972 the school hired its first female teacher and accepted its first female students.

The school facilities include three science labs, a computer lab, a woodwork room, a home economics room, a canteen, a sports hall, a swimming pool and a number of other sporting facilities, including pitches and handball alleys.

== Fingerprinting ==
In 2009 the school introduced an electronic fingerprinting system to assist with daily attendance and monitor absenteeism. This action gained national attention and the government's Data Protection Commission launched an investigation.

== Notable alumni ==
- Darren Shan (b. 1972) - writer and novelist
- Philip Lynch (b. 1946) - businessman
