= Pallaskenry Agricultural College =

Agricultural school in County Limerick, Ireland

Pallaskenry Agricultural College, officially the Salesian Agricultural College, is a private college in Pallaskenry, County Limerick in Ireland which provides training for farmers, mechanics and salespeople for the agricultural and farm machinery industries. Established in 1922, it is owned and managed by the Salesian Fathers. The college is co-located with Salesian Secondary College. The Salesians also previously ran an agricultural and horticultural college at Warrenstown College in County Meath.

The college runs courses in partnership with Limerick Institute of Technology (LIT), Teagasc, FETAC, HETAC, City & Guilds, Fás and Limerick VEC. Courses include an Advanced Certificate in Agriculture and an Advanced Certificate in Agricultural Mechanisation validated by FETAC, as well as a Higher Certificate in Technology in Agricultural Mechanisation validated by HETAC with LIT.

The college farm, of over 220 hectares, has a dairy herd, milking parlour and a dairy shed. There are also engineering and machinery workshops to facilitate the delivery of the college's machinery programmes. As of 2022, the college farm extended to about 550 acres, carrying some 700 head of dairy and beef cattle, and the college's "Green Cert" courses at levels 5 and 6 were reported to be in strong demand. In 2023, the college, working with Teagasc, began converting its drystock (beef and sheep) enterprise to organic production.
