= 1971 Meath Senior Football Championship =

Meath S.F.C.
- Season: 1971
- Champions: Kilbride; 5th Senior Championship Title
- Relegated: Drumree
- Leinster SCFC: Kilbride
- All Ireland SCFC: n/a
- Winning Captain: Pat Bruton (Kilbride)
- Matches: 40

The 1971 Meath Senior Football Championship is the 79th edition of the Meath GAA's premier club Gaelic football tournament for senior graded teams in County Meath, Ireland. The tournament consists of 15 teams, with the winner going on to represent Meath in the Leinster Senior Club Football Championship. The championship starts with a group stage and then progresses to a knock out stage.

This season saw Dunderry's return to the top flight after claiming the 1970 Meath Intermediate Football Championship title. It was also Syddan's return to the top flight after their application to be promoted from the 1970 I.F.C. was granted, even though they had failed to reach the knockout stages of the competition.

Kilbride were the defending champions after they defeated Navan O'Mahonys in the previous years final, and they successfully defended their title to claim a 3-in-a-row of titles and their 5th in 8 seasons when beating Skryne 1-8 to 0-9 in the final in Pairc Tailteann. It was also their 7th final appearance in 8 seasons, a feat achieved by no other club to date. Pat Bruton raised the Keegan Cup for the Dunboyne parish outfit.

Drumree applied to be regraded to the 1972 I.F.C. at the end of the campaign.

== Team changes ==
The following teams have changed division since the 1970 championship season.

=== To S.F.C. ===
Promoted from I.F.C.

- Dunderry - (Intermediate Champions).
- Syddan

=== From S.F.C. ===
Regraded to I.F.C.

- Oldcastle

== Group stage ==
=== Group A ===
Team	Pld	W	L	D	PF	PA	PD	Pts
Kilbride	7	6	1	0	0	0	+0	12
Dunderry	7	6	1	0	0	0	+0	12
Duleek	7	6	1	0	0	0	+0	12
Gaeil Colmcille	7	3	4	0	0	0	+0	6
Navan O'Mahonys	7	3	4	0	0	0	+0	6
Walterstown	7	3	4	0	0	0	+0	6
St. Patrick's	7	1	6	0	0	0	+0	2
Drumree	7	0	7	0	0	0	+0	0

Round 1:

- Dunderry 1-8, 0-7 Walterstown, Kells, 18/4/1971,
- Kilbride +12, -12 Drumree, Dunshaughlin, 25/4/1971,
- Duleek w, l Gaeil Colmcille, Seneschalstown, 25/4/1971,
- Navan O'Mahonys w, l St. Patrick's, Duleek, 9/5/1971,

Round 2:

- Walterstown 2-15, 1-4 Drumree, Trim, 9/5/1971,
- Dunderry 1-6, 1-4 Kilbride, Dunshaughlin, 9/5/1971,
- Duleek 0-10, 1-6 Navan O'Mahonys, Seneschalstown, 23/5/1971,
- Gaeil Colmcille 2-12, 0-6 St. Patrick's, Pairc Tailteann, 23/5/1971,

Round 3:

- Kilbride 0-12, 1-6 Walterstown, Dunshaughlin, 23/5/1971,
- Dunderry 2-10, 1-5 Drumree, Summerhill, 23/5/1971,
- Duleek w, l St. Patrick's, Dunshaughlin, 6/6/1971,
- Gaeil Colmcille 2-8, 0-5 Navan O'Mahonys, Athboy, 20/6/1971,

Round 4:

- Kilbride 2-11, 1-8 Duleek, Dunshaughlin, 13/6/1971,
- Dunderry 2-13, 1-5 St. Patrick's, Seneschalstown, 20/6/1971,
- Navan O'Mahonys 3-10, 2-7 Drumree, Kilmessan, 4/7/1971,
- Walterstown 0-13, 0-2 Gaeil Colmcille, Pairc Tailteann, 4/7/1971,

Round 5:

- Kilbride 3-7, 2-8 St. Patrick's, Duleek, 4/7/1971,
- Duleek w, l Drumree, Seneschalstown, 18/7/1971,
- Dunderry w, l Gaeil Colmcille, Pairc Tailteann, 18/7/1971,
- Navan O'Mahonys 1-12, 1-9 Walterstown, Pairc Tailteann, 15/8/1971,

Round 6:

- Kilbride 1-12, 0-10 Gaeil Colmcille, Pairc Tailteann, 15/8/1971,
- Dunderry w, l Navan O'Mahonys, Martry, 22/8/1971,
- Duleek w, l Walterstown, Stamullen, 22/8/1971,
- St. Patrick's w/o, scr Drumree,

Round 7:

- Kilbride 1-12, 0-5 Navan O'Mahonys, Skryne, 29/8/1971,
- Duleek 2-9, 1-11 Dunderry, Skryne, 29/8/1971,
- Gaeil Colmcille w/o, scr Drumree,
- Walterstown w/o, scr St. Patrick's,

Semi-final playoff:

- Kilbride 0-10, 1-7 Dunderry, Pairc Tailteann, 5/9/1971,
- Dunderry 2-14, 1-3 Duleek, Pairc Tailteann, 12/9/1971,
- Kilbride 1-8, 1-6 Duleek, Kilmessan, 19/9/1971,

=== Group B ===
Team	Pld	W	L	D	PF	PA	PD	Pts
Skryne	6	5	0	1	0	0	+0	11
Trim	6	5	1	0	0	0	+0	10
Seneschalstown	6	4	1	1	0	0	+0	9
Syddan	6	3	3	0	0	0	+0	6
Slane	6	2	4	0	0	0	+0	4
Ballinlough	6	1	5	0	0	0	+0	2
St. Vincent's	6	0	6	0	0	0	+0	0

Round 1:

- Syddan 2-7, 0-6 Slane, Kilbride, 18/4/1971,
- Skryne 1-8, 0-7 Ballinlough, Pairc Tailteann, 25/4/1971,
- Seneschalstown 0-14, 1-7 St. Vincent's, Dunshaughlin, 9/5/1971,
- Trim - Bye,

Round 2:

- Trim w, l Syddan, Pairc Tailteann, 9/5/1971,
- Ballinlough 2-9, 0-11 St. Vincent's, Pairc Tailteann, 23/5/1971,
- Skryne 1-7, 0-10 Seneschalstown, Duleek, 23/5/1971,
- Slane - Bye,

Round 3:

- Trim 3-10, 2-6 Slane, Kilmessan, 23/5/1971,
- Skryne 2-11, 1-9 St. Vincent's, Pairc Tailteann, 6/6/1971,
- Seneschalstown +10, -10 Ballinlough, Kells, 6/6/1971,
- Syddan - Bye,

Round 4:

- Trim 4-10, 3-5 Seneschalstown, Pairc Tailteann, 13/6/1971,
- Syddan w, l St. Vincent's, Seneschalstown, 13/6/1971,
- Skryne 2-6, 0-3 Slane, Seneschalstown, 4/7/1971,
- Ballinlough - Bye,

Round 5:

- Syddan w/o, scr Ballinlough, Kells, 20/6/1971,
- Trim 1-9, 0-9 St. Vincent's, Dunshaughlin, 4/7/1971,
- Seneschalstown w, l Slane, Duleek, 11/7/1971,
- Skryne - Bye,

Round 6:

- Skryne w, l Syddan, Pairc Tailteann, 18/7/1971,
- Slane w, l St. Vincent's, 18/7/1971,
- Trim w, l Ballinlough,
- Seneschalstown - Bye,

Round 7:

- Skryne 1-11, 1-5 Trim, Pairc Tailteann, 15/8/1971,
- Slane w, l Ballinlough,
- Seneschalstown w, l Syddan,
- St. Vincent's - Bye,

== Knock-out Stages ==
The winners and runners up of each group qualify for the semi-finals.

Semi-finals
1	Kilbride	1-7
4	Trim	0-7
3	Skryne	0-13
2	Dunderry	0-5

Final
Kilbride	1-8
Skryne	0-9

Semi-finals:

- Kilbride 1-7, 0-7 Trim, Pairc Tailteann, 1/10/1971,
- Skryne 0-13, 0-5 Dunderry, Pairc Tailteann, 10/10/1971,

Final:

- Kilbride 1-8, 0-9 Skryne, Pairc Tailteann, 24/10/1971,

== Leinster Senior Club Football Championship ==
Preliminary round:

- Kilbride 0-8, 0-7 Athlone, Cusack Park, 11/4/1971,

Quarter-final:

- Kilbride v ???
