= 1969 Meath Senior Football Championship =

Meath S.F.C.
- Season: 1969
- Champions: Kilbride; 3rd Senior Championship Title
- Relegated: None
- Winning Captain: Austin Reddan (Kilbride)
- Matches: 40

The 1969 Meath Senior Football Championship is the 77th edition of the Meath GAA's premier club Gaelic football tournament for senior graded teams in County Meath, Ireland. The tournament consists of 13 teams, with the winner going on to represent Meath in the Leinster Senior Club Football Championship. The championship starts with a group stage and then progresses to a knock out stage.

This season saw Slane's return to the top flight after claiming the 1968 Meath Intermediate Football Championship title.

Gaeil Colmcille were the defending champions after they defeated Walterstown in the previous years final, however they relinquished their crown at the semi-final stage when losing to eventual champions Kilbride.

Kilbride claimed their 3rd S.F.C. title on 14 December 1969 when defeating Skryne in the final 2-5 to 0-5 in the final in Pairc Tailteann. It was also their 5th final appearance in 6 seasons, winning 3 of them. Austin Reddan raised the Keegan Cup for the Dunboyne parish outfit.

== Team changes ==
The following teams have changed division since the 1968 championship season.

=== To S.F.C. ===
Promoted from I.F.C.

- Slane - (Intermediate Champions).

=== From S.F.C. ===
Regraded to I.F.C.

- Kilmainhamwood

== Group stage ==
=== Group A ===
Team	Pld	W	L	D	PF	PA	PD	Pts
Kilbride	5	5	0	0	0	0	+0	10
Slane	5	4	0	0	0	0	+0	8
Navan O'Mahonys	5	3	2	0	0	0	+0	6
Trim	5	1	3	1	0	0	+0	3
St. Vincent's	5	1	3	1	0	0	+0	3
Oldcastle	5	0	5	0	0	0	+0	0

Round 1:

- Kilbride 3-10, 0-5 Oldcastle, Pairc Tailteann, 4/5/1969,
- Slane 2-7, 0-8 Navan O'Mahonys, Skryne, 4/5/1969,
- Trim d, d St. Vincent's, Skryne, 4/5/1969,

Round 2:

- Kilbride 2-11, 0-2 Slane, Skryne, 18/5/1969,
- Navan O'Mahonys +2, -2 St. Vincent's, Skryne, 18/5/1969,
- Trim 4-5, 0-8 Oldcastle, Athboy, 18/5/1969,

Round 3:

- Kilbride +2, -2 Navan O'Mahonys, Dunshaughlin, 29/6/1969,
- St. Vincent's 5-4, 2-4 Oldcastle, Pairc Tailteann, 29/6/1969,
- Slane 1-19, 1-6 Trim, Kells, 27/7/1969,

Round 4:

- Kilbride w, l St. Vincent's, Dunshaughlin, 13/7/1969,
- Slane 4-8, 1-2 Oldcastle, Gibbstown, 17/8/1969,
- Navan O'Mahonys w, l Trim, Skryne, 24/8/1969,

Round 5:

- Slane w, l St. Vincent's, Duleek, 24/8/1969,
- Kilbride w, l Trim,
- Navan O'Mahonys w, l Oldcastle,

=== Group B ===
Team	Pld	W	L	D	PF	PA	PD	Pts
Skryne	6	0	6	0	0	0	+0	12
Gaeil Colmcille	6	4	1	1	0	0	+0	9
Ballinlough	6	4	1	1	0	0	+0	9
Seneschalstown	6	3	3	0	0	0	+0	6
Walterstown	6	2	4	0	0	0	+0	4
Duleek	6	1	5	0	0	0	+0	2
St. Patrick's	6	0	6	0	0	0	+0	0

Round 1:

- Gaeil Colmcille 1-7, 1-5 Seneschalstown, Pairc Tailteann, 4/5/1969,
- Ballinlough +2, -2 Duleek, Gibbstown, 4/5/1969,
- Skryne 5-5, 2-6 St. Patrick's, Duleek, 4/5/1969,
- Walterstown - ye,

Round 2:

- Gaeil Colmcille 0-8, 0-7 Walterstown, Pairc Tailteann, 18/5/1969,
- Ballinlough 2-4, 2-2 St. Patrick's, Pairc Tailteann, 18/5/1969,
- Skryne 2-12, 1-8 Duleek, Dunshaughlin, 1/6/1969,
- Seneschalstown - Bye,

Round 3:

- Seneschalstown 1-10, 1-9 Walterstown, Pairc Tailteann, 1/6/1969,
- Skryne w, l Ballinlough, Pairc Tailteann, 29/6/1969,
- Duleek w, l St. Patrick's, Duleek, 29/6/1969,
- Gaeil Colmcille - Bye,

Round 4:

- Seneschalstown 2-6, 2-1 Duleek, Seneschalstown, 13/7/1969,
- Gaeil Colmcille w/o, scr St. Vincent's, Seneschalstown, 13/7/1969,
- Skryne 1-11, 0-5 Walterstown, Pairc Tailteann, 23/7/1969,
- Ballinlough - Bye,

Round 5:

- Gaeil Colmcille d, d Ballinlough, Gibbstown, 27/7/1969,
- Skryne 1-13, 0-6 Seneschalstown, Pairc Tailteann, 24/8/1969,
- Walterstown w, l Duleek,
- St. Patrick's - Bye,

Round 6:

- Ballinlough w/o, scr Walterstown, Gibbstown, 10/8/1969,
- Gaeil Colmcille 4-10, 2-1 Duleek, Pairc Tailteann, 24/8/1969,
- Seneschalstown w/o, scr St. Patrick's,
- Skryne - Bye,

Round 7:

- Skryne 0-11, 0-6 Gaeil Colmcille, Pairc Tailteann, 21/9/1969,
- Ballinlough 1-7, 0-5 Seneschalstown, Pairc Tailteann, 21/9/1969,
- Walterstown w/o, scr St. Patrick's,
- Duleek - Bye,

Semi-final playoff:

- Gaeil Colmcille 1-7, 0-9 Ballinlough, Gibbstown, 5/10/1969,

== Knock-out Stages ==
The winners and runners up of each group qualify for the semi-finals.

Semi-finals
1	Kilbride	1-6
4	Gaeil Colmcille	0-4
3	Skryne	1-11
2	Slane	2-5

Final
Kilbride	2-5
Skryne	0-5

Semi-finals:

- Skryne 1-11, 2-5 Slane, Pairc Tailteann, 5/10/1969,
- Kilbride 1-6, 0-4 Gaeil Colmcille, Pairc Tailteann, 30/11/1969, *

Final:

- Kilbride 2-5, 0-5 Skryne, Pairc Tailteann, 14/12/1969,
- Gaeil Colmcille refused to fulfill their semi-final fixture against Kilbride on 12 October due to the absence of two key players for them. At a County Board meeting on 13 October Kilbride were awarded a walkover for the fixture. However the Kells club brought the matter to the Leinster Council on 15 November to appeal their expulsion from the competition. They refused to overturn the decision however they strongly urged the Meath County Board to reconsider their decision.

On 20 November, the County Board met again and a vote was held between delegated? which resulted in a unanimous reversal of Gaeil Colmcille's expulsion.
