= 1970 Meath Senior Football Championship =

Meath S.F.C.
- Season: 1970
- Champions: Kilbride; 4th Senior Championship Title
- Relegated: Oldcastle
- Winning Captain: Owen Sullivan (Kilbride)
- Matches: 40

The 1970 Meath Senior Football Championship is the 78th edition of the Meath GAA's premier club Gaelic football tournament for senior graded teams in County Meath, Ireland. The tournament consists of 14 teams, with the winner going on to represent Meath in the Leinster Senior Club Football Championship. The championship starts with a group stage and then progresses to a knock out stage.

This season saw Drumree's return to the top flight after claiming the 1969 Meath Intermediate Football Championship title.

Kilbride were the defending champions after they defeated Skryne in the previous years final, and they successfully defended their title to claim a 2-in-a-row of titles and their 3rd in 4 seasons when defeating Navan O'Mahonys 0-9 to 0-7 in the final in Pairc Tailteann. It was also their 6th final appearance in 7 seasons, winning 4 of them.

Oldcastle applied to be regraded to the 1971 I.F.C. at the end of the campaign.

== Team changes ==
The following teams have changed division since the 1969 championship season.

=== To S.F.C. ===
Promoted from I.F.C.

- Drumree - (Intermediate Champions).

=== From S.F.C. ===
Regraded to I.F.C.

- None

== Group stage ==
=== Group A ===
Team	Pld	W	L	D	PF	PA	PD	Pts
Navan O'Mahonys	6	6	0	0	0	0	+0	12
Kilbride	6	4	1	1	0	0	+0	9
Ballinlough	6	4	1	1	0	0	+0	9
Drumree	6	3	3	0	0	0	+0	6
St. Vincent's	6	2	4	0	0	0	+0	4
St. Patrick's	6	1	5	0	0	0	+0	2
Trim	6	0	6	0	0	0	+0	0

Round 1:

- Kilbride w, l Drumree, Skryne, 22/3/1970,
- Ballinlough 0-9, 1-3 Trim, Athboy, 5/4/1970,
- Navan O'Mahonys w, l St. Vincent's, Duleek, 5/4/1970,
- St. Patrick's - Bye,

Round 2:

- Kilbride 1-5, 0-8 Ballinlough, Pairc Tailteann, 19/4/1970,
- Drumree 1-7, 0-7 Trim, Kilmessan, 19/4/1970,
- Navan O'Mahonys w, l St. Patrick's,
- St. Vincent's - Bye,

Round 3:

- St. Vincent's w, l St. Patrick's, Duleek, 19/4/1970,
- Ballinlough 4-6, 2-10 Drumree, Pairc Tailteann, 3/5/1970,
- Kilbride 3-10, 1-5 Trim, Kilmessan, 17/5/1970,
- Navan O'Mahonys - Bye,

Round 4:

- Navan O'Mahonys w, l Drumree, Skryne, 17/5/1970,
- Ballinlough 3-11, 0-4 St. Vincent's, Pairc Tailteann, 31/5/1970,
- Kilbride w, l St. Patrick's, Duleek, 31/5/1970,
- Trim - Bye,

Round 5:

- Navan O'Mahonys w/o, scr Trim, Pairc Tailteann, 31/5/1970,
- Drumree 1-12, 2-6 St. Patrick's, Skryne, 7/6/1970,
- Kilbride 1-7, 1-4 St. Vincent's, Duleek, 26/7/1970,
- Ballinlough - Bye,

Round 6:

- Navan O'Mahonys 2-12, 2-11 Ballinlough, Kells, 28/6/1970,
- Drumree w, l St. Vincent's, Skryne, 12/7/1970,
- St. Patrick's w/o, scr Trim,
- Kilbride - Bye,

Round 7:

- Navan O'Mahonys 1-10, 1-5 Kilbride, Dunshaughlin, 23/8/1970,
- Ballinlough 3-14, 1-6 St. Patrick's, Pairc Tailteann, 23/8/1970,
- St. Vincent's w/o, scr Trim,
- Drumree - Bye,

Semi-final playoff:

- Kilbride w, l Ballinlough,

=== Group B ===
Team	Pld	W	L	D	PF	PA	PD	Pts
Gaeil Colmcille	6	6	0	0	0	0	+0	12
Skryne	6	5	1	0	0	0	+0	10
Walterstown	6	4	2	0	0	0	+0	8
Seneschalstown	6	3	3	0	0	0	+0	6
Slane	6	2	4	0	0	0	+0	4
Duleek	6	1	5	0	0	0	+0	2
Oldcastle	6	0	6	0	0	0	+0	0

Round 1:

- Gaeil Colmcille 4-6, 0-5 Skryne, Pairc Tailteann, 22/3/1970,
- Seneschalstown 2-8, 0-10 Slane, Pairc Tailteann, 22/3/1970,
- Walterstown 1-9, 1-3 Oldcastle, Kells, 5/4/1970,
- Duleek - Bye,

Round 2:

- Seneschalstown 3-8, 1-4 Duleek, Pairc Tailteann, 5/4/1970,
- Skryne 2-9, 0-8 Oldcastle, Kells, 3/5/1970,
- Gaeil Colmcille +4, -4 Walterstown, Pairc Tailteann, 3/5/1970,
- Slane - Bye,

Round 3:

- Slane w, l Duleek, Seneschalstown, 5/4/1970,
- Gaeil Colmcille w, l Oldcastle, Gibbstown, 17/5/1970,
- Skryne 1-14, 2-5 Walterstown, Pairc Tailteann, 28/6/1970,
- Seneschalstown - Bye,

Round 4:

- Gaeil Colmcille 0-12, 1-7 Seneschalstown, Pairc Tailteann, 24/5/1970,
- Slane 2-4, 2-3 Oldcastle, Gibbstown, 24/5/1970,
- Skryne w, l Duleek, Seneschalstown, 12/7/1970,
- Walterstown - Bye,

Round 5:

- Walterstown 1-10, 1-7 Seneschalstown, Duleek, 26/7/1970,
- Gaeil Colmcille w, l Duleek, Pairc Tailteann, 26/7/1970,
- Skryne w, l Slane, Seneschalstown, 30/8/1970,
- Oldcastle - Bye,

Round 6:

- Walterstown +1, -1 Duleek, Skryne, 16/8/1970,
- Seneschalstown 3-7, 1-6 Oldcastle, Athboy, 30/8/1970,
- Gaeil Colmcille w, l Slane,
- Skryne - Bye,

Round 7:

- Skryne 2-4, 0-7 Seneschalstown, Duleek, 6/9/1970,
- Walterstown w, l Slane,
- Duleek w/o, scr Oldcastle,
- Gaeil Colmcille - Bye,

== Knock-out Stages ==
The winners and runners up of each group qualify for the semi-finals.

Semi-finals
1	Navan O'Mahonys	1-9 R
4	Gaeil Colmcille	1-7 R
3	Skryne	0-10
2	Kilbride	2-8

Final
Navan O'Mahonys	0-7
Kilbride	0-9

Semi-finals:

- Kilbride 2-8, 0-10 Skryne, Pairc Tailteann, 4/10/1970,
- Navan O'Mahonys 0-10, 1-7 Gaeil Colmcille, Pairc Tailteann, 4/10/1970,
- Navan O'Mahonys 1-9, 1-7 Gaeil Colmcille, Pairc Tailteann, 25/10/1970,

Final:

- Kilbride 0-9, 0-7 Navan O'Mahonys, Pairc Tailteann, ??/11/1970,
