= Warrenstown College =

Former agricultural school in Drumree, Ireland

Coordinates: 53.437°N 6.489°W

Warrenstown College was an agricultural and horticultural college run by the Salesian congregation, in Drumree, County Meath.

== History ==
The Salesian order received the lands in Drumree under the will of Elizabeth Lynch, a descendant of the Warren family local to the area, and they started training men for the agricultural industry in 1923. In 1958, the college developed a new site beside the old college building, and in 1968, specific programmes for the horticultural industry were started at the college.

In the 1980s, the college offered a two-year course in commercial horticulture and awarded a senior certificate to successful candidates.

Produce from the farm and glasshouses was sold through the market at Smithfield in Dublin.

The principal of the horticultural college was Br James O'Hare, succeeded by Harold Lawlor.

The college offered a FETAC Vocational Certificate in Horticulture at three different levels (4, 5 and 6) with progression routes such as the National Diploma in Horticulture which validated by HETAC and run in conjunction with Teagasc and other horticultural colleges, was available at Warrenstown.

The college had developed links with the nearby Institute of Technology, Blanchardstown, and developed a BSc in horticulture.

=== Closure ===
The agricultural college closed in 2001, and in 2008 Warrenstown Horticultural College also announced it was to close in 2009. 200 students and staff were to be transferred to the Botanic Gardens (who also have a linkage with IT Blanchardstown) and other Teagasc facilities.

The 450 acre farm was sold in 2008 for €13.8million.

=== Colaiste na bhFiann ===
Since 2010, the college has been a site for Coláiste na bhFiann, an Irish Language college who purchased the college and 20 acres from the Salesians. The Salesians, whose headquarters is in Crumlin, Dublin 12, still run Pallaskenry Agricultural College in Limerick.
