= Jack Fagan (journalist) =

Irish journalist and Gaelic footballer (1939–2024)

Jack Fagan (11 July 1939 – 15 September 2024) was an Irish journalist who spent many years with the Irish Times. He was also a Gaelic footballer with Meath and won an All-Ireland MFC medal in 1957.

== Sporting career ==
Fagan first played Gaelic football to a high standard as a student at Navan Vocational School. He was part of the Meath vocational schools' team that won the All-Ireland Vocational Schools' SFC title in 1956. Fagan's adult club career with Navan O'Mahonys also began around this time. He was part of the club's senior team that won five consecutive Meath SFC titles between 1957 and 1961.

Fagan first played for Meath at inter-county level as a member of the minor team. He was part of the team that won the All-Ireland MFC after beating Armagh in the 1957 All-Ireland minor final. Fagan progressed to the junior team and won a Leinster JFC medal in 1958. He made his senior team debut during their 1958-59 National League campaign.

== Journalism career ==
Fagan's career as a journalist began in the late 1950s with the Meath Chronicle, before moving to the Drogheda Independent. He joined the Irish Times as a reporter in the early 1960s. Fagan's 50-year career with that newspaper saw him hold various positions, including aviation correspondent, deputy news editor and property editor. He officially retired in 2004, however, he remained with the newspaper as editor of their commercial property coverage. Fagan finally retired in January 2019.

== Death ==
Fagan had Alzheimer's disease for the last few years of his life. He died on 15 September 2024, at the age of 85.

== Honours ==
Navan O'Mahonys

- Meath Senior Football Championship: 1957, 1958, 1959, 1960, 1961

Meath

- Leinster Junior Football Championship: 1958
- All-Ireland Minor Football Championship: 1957
- Leinster Minor Football Championship: 1957
