= Kilbride GAA (Meath) =

Gaelic football club in County Meath, Ireland

Kilbride
- Cill Bhríde
- Founded: 1948
- County: Meath
- Colours
- Grounds: Kilbride GAA Grounds
- Coordinates: 53°27′12″N 6°23′48″W

Playing kits
Standard colours

Senior Club Championships
	All Ireland	Leinster champions	Meath champions
Football:	0	0	5
Camogie:	0	0	3

Kilbride GAA is a Gaelic Athletic Association club based in the village of Kilbride, County Meath, Ireland. The club is affiliated to the Meath County Board and fields teams in camogie and Gaelic football.

== History ==
Kilbride GAA is located in the village of Kilbride, around 10 km from Dunboyne. The GAA club was officially founded in 1948, though little success came their way during the 1950s.

Kilbride went from the Meath Junior Football Championship to winning the Meath Senior Football Championship in the space of five years. They won their first Meath SFC title in 1964, and added four more over the proceeding seven years, winning three-in-a-row from 1969 to 1971. Kilbride have won two Meath IFC titles, each in 1962 and 2025. As of 2026, Kilbride compete within the Meath Senior Football Championship.

Kilbride also founded an associated camogie club in 1964, winning 3 SCC titles within four years.

== Honours ==
- Meath Senior Football Championship (5): 1964, 1967, 1969, 1970, 1971
- Meath Intermediate Football Championship (2): 1962, 2025
- Meath Junior 'A' Football Championship (2): 1960, 2023
- Meath Senior Camogie Championship (3): 1981, 1983, 1984
- Feis Cup (3): 1963, 1964, 1966

== Notable Players ==
- Gerry Quinn: All-Ireland SFC-winner (1967)
- Jack Quinn: All-Ireland SFC-winner (1967)
- Martin Quinn: All-Ireland SFC-winner (1967)

Preceded by Kilbride	Meath Senior Football Champions; 1971	Succeeded by Seneschalstown
