= 1967 Meath Intermediate Football Championship =

Meath I.F.C.
- Season: 1967
- Champions: Seneschalstown; 2nd Intermediate Football Championship title
- Relegated: Ballinabrackey; Garryowen; Rathmolyon

The 1967 Meath Intermediate Football Championship is the 41st edition of the Meath GAA's premier club Gaelic football tournament for intermediate graded teams in County Meath, Ireland. The tournament consists of 22 teams. The championship starts with a group stage and then progresses to a knock out stage.

Drumree were regraded from the 1966 S.F.C. The Drumbaragh Emmets club was also reformed as a new club to enter the I.F.C. after a fallout from Gaeil Colmcille (an amalgamation of the Kells Harps and Drumbaragh clubs in 1964). Gaeil Colmcille continued to ply their trade in the senior championship.

This year marked the Garryowen club's (from Kilberry; not to be mistaken with another J.A.F.C. known as Kilberry G.F.C. at the time) first year in existence.

Gaeil Colmcille 'B', Summerhill and Kilallon were promoted after claiming the 1966 Meath Junior Football Championship title, runners-up spot and Junior 'A' Divisional runners-up spot respectively. Castletown's application to be promoted was also granted by the Co. Board.

At the end of the season Ballinabrackey, Garryowen and Rathmolyon applied to be regraded to the 1967 J.F.C.

On 29 October 1967, Seneschalstown claimed their 2nd Intermediate championship title when they defeated Bohermeen 0-11 to 0-3 in the final at Pairc Tailteann.

== Team changes ==
The following teams have changed division since the 1966 championship season.

=== From I.F.C. ===
Promoted to S.F.C.

- Duleek - (Intermediate Champions)

Relegated to 1967 J.A.F.C.

- Kilberry
- St. Peter's Dunboyne

=== To I.F.C. ===
Regraded from S.F.C.

- Drumree

Promoted from 1966 J.A.F.C. & J.B.F.C.

- Gaeil Colmcille 'B' - (Junior & Junior 'B' Divisional Champions)
- Summerhill - (Junior Runners-Up & Junior 'A' Divisional Champions)
- Kilallon - (Junior 'A' Divisional Runners-Up)
- Castletown - (Application to be promoted granted by the County Board)

New Clubs

- Drumbaragh Emmets - (Established after a fallout from Gaeil Colmcille)
- Garryowen - (Newly formed club)

== Group stage ==
There are 4 groups called Group A, B, C and D. The top finisher in each group will qualify for the Semi-Finals. Many results were unavailable in the Meath Chronicle.

=== Group A ===
Team	Pld	W	L	D	PF	PA	PD	Pts
Bohermeen	4	3	1	0	0	0	+0	6
Martry	4	3	1	0	0	0	+0	6
Kilallon	4	2	2	0	0	0	+0	4
Gaeil Colmcille 'B'	4	2	2	0	0	0	+0	4
Oldcastle	4	0	4	0	0	0	+0	0

Round 1:

- Bohermeen 1-4, 1-2 Kilallon, Kells, 19/3/1967,
- Martry w, l Oldcastle, Athboy, 19/3/1967,
- Gaeil Colmcille 'B' - Bye,

Round 2:

- Kilallon 1-6, 0-7 Oldcastle, Kells, 23/4/1967,
- Gaeil Colmcille 'B' 5-4, 1-3 Martry, Pairc Tailteann, 14/5/1967,
- Bohermeen - Bye,

Round 3:

- Bohermeen +3, -3 Oldcastle, Kells, 30/4/1967,
- Kilallon w, l Gaeil Colmcille 'B', Athboy, 4/6/1967,
- Martry - Bye,

Round 4:

- Martry w, l Bohermeen, Kells, 4/6/1967,
- Gaeil Colmcille 'B' w, l Oldcastle, Ballinlough, 16/7/1967,
- Kilallon - Bye,

Round 5:

- Martry w, l Kilallon, Athboy, 2/7/1967,
- Bohermeen w, l Gaeil Colmcille 'B',
- Oldcastle - Bye,

Semi-Final Playoff:

- Bohermeen 2-6, 0-8 Martry, Pairc Tailteann, 28/8/1967,

=== Group B ===
Team	Pld	W	L	D	PF	PA	PD	Pts
Slane	1	1	0	0	0	0	+0	2
Syddan	2	1	1	0	0	0	+0	2
Rathkenny	1	1	0	0	0	0	+0	2
Castletown	2	1	1	0	0	0	+0	2
St. Peter's Dunboyne	1	0	1	0	0	0	+0	0
Garryowen	1	0	1	0	0	0	+0	0

Round 1:

- Rathkenny w, l Syddan, Castletown, 19/3/1967,
- Castletown 4-9, 3-2 Garryowen, Kells, 30/4/1967,
- Slane -vs- St. Peter's Dunboyne, Kilmessan, 14/5/1967,

Round 2:

- Garryowen -vs- Syddan, Castletown, 7/5/1967,
- Slane w, l Castletown, Kilberry, 4/6/1967,
- Rathkenny -vs- St. Peter's Dunboyne, Kilmessan, 18/6/1967,

Round 3:

- Slane -vs- Garryowen, Seneschalstown, 11/6/1967,
- Syddan w, l St. Peter's Dunboyne, Gibbstown, 2/7/1967,
- Castletown -vs- Rathkenny, Kilberry, 2/7/1967,

Round 4:

- Rathkenny -vs- Slane, Castletown, 30/7/1967,
- Syddan -vs- Castletown, Kells, 27/8/1967,
- St. Peter's Dunboyne -vs- Garryowen,

Round 5:

- Slane -vs- Syddan, Castletown, 3/9/1967,
- Rathkenny -vs- Garryowen,
- Castletown -vs- St. Peter's Dunboyne,

=== Group C ===
Team	Pld	W	L	D	PF	PA	PD	Pts
Summerhill	4	4	0	0	0	0	+0	8
Ballivor	4	3	0	0	0	0	+0	6
Enfield	4	2	2	0	0	0	+0	4
Ballinabrackey	4	1	3	0	0	0	+0	2
Rathmolyon	4	0	4	0	0	0	+0	0

Round 1:

- Ballivor w, l Rathmolyon, Enfield, 16/4/1967,
- Summerhill w, l Enfield, Kildalkey, 23/4/1967,
- Ballinabrackey - Bye,

Round 2:

- Summerhill w, l Ballinabrackey, Enfield, 7/5/1967,
- Enfield w, l Rathmolyon, Summerhill, 4/6/1967,
- Ballivor - Bye,

Round 3:

- Ballivor 2-5, 1-5 Enfield, Summerhill, 18/6/1967,
- Ballinabrackey 2-4, 0-4 Rathmolyon, Killyon, 18/6/1967,
- Summerhill - Bye,

Round 4:

- Summerhill 1-7, 0-8 Ballivor, Trim, 1/7/1967,
- Enfield w, l Ballinabrackey,
- Rathmolyon - Bye,

Round 5:

- Ballivor w/o, scr Ballinabrackey, Enfield, 30/7/1967,
- Summerhill 3-12, 2-3 Rathmolyon, Trim, 30/7/1967,
- Enfield - Bye,

=== Group D ===
Team	Pld	W	L	D	PF	PA	PD	Pts
Seneschalstown	5	4	0	1	0	0	+0	9
Drumree	5	4	0	1	0	0	+0	9
Salesian College Warrenstown	3	1	2	0	0	0	+0	2
Donaghmore	3	1	2	0	0	0	+0	2
Donore	3	1	2	0	0	0	+0	2
Drumbaragh Emmets	5	0	5	0	0	0	+0	0

Round 1:

- Warrenstown -vs- Donore, Lougher, 19/3/1967,
- Seneschalstown w, l Donaghmore, Skryne, 19/3/1967,
- Drumree w, l Drumbaragh, Seneschalstown, 2/4/1967,

Round 2:

- Warrenstown -vs- Donaghmore, Ratoath, 16/4/1967,
- Drumree w, l Donore, Ratoath, 23/4/1967,
- Seneschalstown 3-15, 0-2 Drumbaragh, Pairc Tailteann, 23/4/1967,

Round 3:

- Donore w/o, scr Drumbaragh, Pairc Tailteann, 30/4/1967,
- Seneschalstown w, l Warrenstown, Seneschalstown, 4/5/1967,
- Drumree w, l Donaghmore, Dunshaughlin, 4/6/1967,

Round 4:

- Donaghmore -vs- Donore, Seneschalstown, 11/6/1967,
- Seneschalstown d, d Drumree, Pairc Tailteann, 2/7/1967,
- Warrenstown w/o, scr Drumbaragh,

Round 5:

- Donaghmore w/o, scr Drumbaragh, Pairc Tailteann, 30/4/1967,
- Seneschalstown w, l Donore, Duleek, 16/7/1967,
- Drumree w, l Warrenstown,

Semi-Final Playoff:

- Seneschalstown 3-7, 2-5 Drumree, Pairc Tailteann, 28/8/1967,

== Knock-out Stages ==
The teams in the Semi-Finals are the first and second placed teams from each group.

Semi-Finals
Bohermeen	2-5
Summerhill	1-7
Slane	0-5
Seneschalstown	1-5

Final
Bohermeen	0-3
Seneschalstown	0-11

Semi-Final:

- Seneschalstown 1-5, 0-5 Slane, Pairc Tailteann, 1/10/1967,
- Bohermeen 2-5, 1-7 Summerhill, Trim, 8/10/1967,

Final:

- Seneschalstown 0-11, 0-3 Bohermeen, Pairc Tailteann, 29/10/1967,
