= 1887 Meath Senior Football Championship =

Meath S.F.C.
- Season: 1887
- Champions: Dowdstown
- Relegated: None
- All Ireland S.F.C.: Dowdstown; Commercials 3-2, 0-2 Dowdstown
- Matches: 11

The 1887 Meath Football Championship was the first edition of the Meath GAA's premier inter-county Gaelic football tournament, for the 12 clubs that chose to participate. The final was played on Sunday 17 April 1887, with Dowdstown (later to become Walterstown) winning by 1–0 to 0–0 against Kells. Unlike later Meath Football Championships, there were no groups and it was an open draw.

Dowdstown, as county champions, went on to represent Meath in the 1887 All-Ireland Senior Football Championship, also the first All-Ireland Championship, but lost to Commercials of Limerick in the first round.

== Format ==
The 1887 championship was held as an open-draw knockout tournament.

== Participating clubs ==
The clubs that chose to participate were:

Club	1887 championship position
Donecarney	semi-final
Donore	round one
Dowdstown	champions
Grangegeeth	round two
Kells	runners-up
Kilbeg	round two
Marywell	round one
Mullagh	round one
Rathkenny	round one
Stackallen	round one
Yellow Furze	round one

== Results ==
In 1887 point posts flanked the goalposts. A forfeit point was awarded to the opposition when a defender kicked the ball over his own end line. Forfeit points were counted when the scores were level at the end of the game. A forfeit point is represented as 0-0-1 (Goal-Point-Forfeit).

=== First round ===
13 March 1887
First round

Mullagh	0-6 - 0-8	Kilbeg

13 March 1887
First round

Stackallen	0-3-0 - 2-20-6	Kells

13 March 1887
First round

Marywell	L - W	Kilmessan

13 March 1887
First round

Yellow Furze	0-0-0 - 0-7-2	Dowdstown

13 March 1887
First round

Rathkenny	0-0-1 - 1-1-1	Grangegeeth

13 March 1887
First round

Donore	0-1 - 1-2	Donecarney

=== Second round ===
1887
Second round

Grangegeeth	0-0-0 - 0-2-1	Doncarney

1887
Second round

Dowdstown	0-1 - 0-0	Kilmessan

1887
Second round

Kilbeg	0-0-0 - 0-13-5	Kells

=== Semi-final ===
1887
Semi-final

Dowdstown	W - L	Donecarney

=== Final ===
17 April 1887
Final

Dowdstown	1-0 - 0-0	Kells

Kells objected to the result maintaining that the Dowdstown goal was unjustly scored. A subsequent County Committee meeting did not accept the objection. Kells submitted the dispute to the Central Executive. No record can be found of the result of this objection other than Dowdstown were eventually declared winners of the 1887 Meath Football Championship.
