= Gilsenan =

Gilsenan is a surname which may originate with followers of Senán mac Geirrcinn. Notable people with the surname include:

- Matthew Gilsenan (born 1971), Irish singer
- Alan Gilsenan (born 1962), Irish writer, filmmaker, and theater director
- Conor Gilsenan (born 1992), Irish rugby union player
- Matt Gilsenan (1915–2013), Irish Gaelic footballer
- Zak Gilsenan (born 2003), Irish soccer player
- Michael Gilsenan, Professor Emeritus of Middle Eastern and Islamic Studies and Anthropology
