= 1959 Meath Intermediate Football Championship =

Meath I.F.C.
- Season: 1959
- Champions: Donaghmore; 3rd Intermediate Football Championship title
- Relegated: Clonard; Curraha; Duleek; Oldcastle (folded)

The 1959 Meath Intermediate Football Championship is the 33rd edition of the Meath GAA's premier club Gaelic football tournament for intermediate graded teams in County Meath, Ireland. The tournament consists of 13 teams. The championship format consists of a group stage before progressing to a knock-out stage.

No team was regraded from the 1958 S.F.C.

At the end of the season Clonard, Curraha and Duleek applied to be regraded to the 1960 J.A.F.C. while the Oldcastle club folded altogether, not participating in Meath GAA competitions again until the 1964 J.A.F.C.

On 6 September 1959, Donaghmore claimed their 3rd Intermediate championship title when they defeated Kilmainhamwood 3-5 to 1-10 in the final at Pairc Tailteann.

== Team changes ==
The following teams have changed division since the 1958 championship season.

=== From I.F.C. ===
Promoted to 1959 S.F.C.

- St. Mary's Bettystown - (Intermediate Champions)

Relegated to 1959 J.A.F.C.

- Kilberry
- Ratoath
- Summerhill

=== To I.F.C. ===
Regraded from 1958 S.F.C.

- None

Promoted from 1958 J.A.F.C. & J.B.F.C.

- Dunshaughlin - (Junior & Junior 'B' Divisional Champions)
- Clonard - (Junior 'A' Divisional Champions & Junior 'A' South Divisional Champions)
- Curraha - (Junior 'A' Divisional Runners-Up & Junior 'A' East Divisional Champions)
- Kilmainhamwood - (Junior 'A' Divisional Semi-Finalists & Junior 'A' North Divisional Champions)
- Carlanstown - (Junior 'A' Divisional Semi-Finalists & Junior 'A' West Divisional Champions)

== Group stage ==
There are 2 groups called Group A and B. The top finisher in each group will qualify for the Final. Some results were unavailable in the Meath Chronicle.

=== Group A ===
Team	Pld	W	L	D	PF	PA	PD	Pts
Donaghmore	3	3	0	0	0	0	+0	6
Castletown	3	1	1	1	0	0	+0	3
Dunshaughlin	2	0	1	1	0	0	+0	1
Slane	0	0	0	0	0	0	+0	0
Duleek	1	0	1	0	0	0	+0	0
Curraha	1	0	1	0	0	0	+0	0

Round 1:

- Donaghmore -vs- Slane, Kilmessan, 8/3/1959,
- Castletown -vs- Curraha, Lougher, 8/3/1959,
- Duleek -vs- Dunshaughlin, Walterstown, 8/3/1959,

Round 2:

- Duleek -vs- Slane, Rossin, 15/3/1959,
- Donaghmore 2-5, 2-2 Castletown, Pairc Tailteann, 15/3/1959,
- Dunshaughlin -vs- Curraha, Walterstown, 12/4/1959,

Round 3:

- Slane -vs- Dunshaughlin, Kilmessan, 19/4/1959,
- Donaghmore 3-6, 1-6 Curraha, Pairc Tailteann, 19/4/1959,
- Castletown 1-5, 0-2 Duleek, pairc Tailteann, 26/4/1959,

Round 4:

- Dunshaughlin 2-3, 1-6 Castletown, Pairc Tailteann, 3/5/1959,
- Donaghmore -vs- Duleek, Skryne, 3/5/1959,
- Slane -vs- Curraha, Skryne, 3/5/1959,

Round 5:

- Donaghmore 1-5, 0-5 Dunshaughlin, Pairc Tailteann, 17/5/1959,
- Slane -vs- Castletown,
- Duleek -vs- Curraha,

=== Group B ===
Team	Pld	W	L	D	PF	PA	PD	Pts
Kilmainhamwood	6	5	0	1	0	0	+0	11
Athboy	6	4	2	0	0	0	+0	8
Carlanstown	6	4	2	0	0	0	+0	8
Fordstown	6	3	3	0	0	0	+0	6
Clonard	5	2	2	1	0	0	+0	5
Ballinabrackey	5	1	4	0	0	0	+0	2
Oldcastle	6	0	6	0	0	0	+0	0

Round 1:

- Athboy 10-10, 0-1 Oldcastle, Kells, 8/3/1959,
- Kilmainhamwood w, l Fordstown, Gibbstown, 8/3/1959,
- Ballinabrackey -vs- Clonard, Longwood, 8/3/1959,
- Carlanstown - Bye,

Round 2:

- Athboy w, l Carlanstown, Bohermeen, 19/4/1959,
- Kilmainhamwood 1-5, 1-5 Clonard, Pairc Tailteann, 19/4/1959,
- Fordstown w, l Ballinabrackey, Kildalkey, 26/4/1959,
- Oldcastle - Bye,

Round 3:

- Carlanstown 3-12, 0-2 Oldcastle, Kells, 26/4/1959,
- Kilmainhamwood w, l Ballinabrackey, Trim, 3/5/1959,
- Clonard w, l Fordstown, Kildalkey, 3/5/1959,
- Athboy - Bye,

Round 4:

- Athboy w, l Ballinabrackey, Trim, 17/5/1959,
- Carlanstown 2-4, 1-2 Clonard, Pairc Tailteann, 28/6/1959,
- Kilmainhamwood w/o, scr Oldcastle,
- Fordstown - Bye,

Round 5:

- Fordstown 3-2, 0-6 Athboy, Pairc Tailteann, 12/7/1959,
- Kilmainhamwood 1-9, 1-4 Carlanstown, Pairc Tailteann, 16/8/1959,
- Clonard w/o, scr Oldcastle,
- Ballinabrackey - Bye,

Round 6:

- Carlanstown 0-12, 1-5 Fordstown, Pairc Tailteann, 19/7/1959,
- Ballinabrackey w/o, scr Oldcastle,
- Athboy w/o, scr Clonard,
- Kilmainhamwood - Bye,

Round 7:

- Kilmainhamwood 1-7, 0-2 Athboy, Kells, 9/8/1959,
- Fordstown w/o, scr Oldcastle,
- Carlanstown w/o, scr Ballinabrackey,
- Clonard - Bye,

== Final ==
- Donaghmore 3-5, 1-10 Kilmainhamwood, Pairc Tailteann, 6/9/1959.
