= 1923 Meath Senior Football Championship =

31st edition of the Meath GAA's premier inter-county Gaelic football tournament

Meath S.F.C.
- Season: 1923
- Champions: Rathkenny; 5th Senior Championship Title
- Relegated: None
- Matches: 2

The 1923 Meath Senior Football Championship was the 31st edition of the Meath GAA's premier inter-county Gaelic football tournament, for the 3 clubs that were entered. The final was played in Kells with Rathkenny receiving a walkover from Navan Harps in the final, and thus claiming their 5th Senior title. This was a strange Championship, in that Rathkenny won the Championship playing only one game in the process.

== Participating Clubs ==
The clubs that participated were:

Club	1923 Championship Position
Martry	Group Phase
Navan Harps	Finalists
Rathkenny	Champions

== Results ==
=== Group Phase ===
1923
Group Phase

Rathkenny	1-3 - 0-0	Martry

Navan

1923
Group Phase

Navan Harps	Null & Void	Martry

- As there were only three teams entered in the Championship, and as Rathkenny had already played Martry it was eventually decided that they would play Navan Harps in the final.

=== Final ===
1923
Final

Rathkenny	w/o - scr	Navan Harps

Kells
- After much discussion, it was decided by the Meath County Board that the final was to be played in Kells. Navan Harps disagreed to this however, and failed to show for the final at Kells. Eventually it was agreed that Rathkenny be awarded the championship.
