= 1964 Meath Intermediate Football Championship =

Meath I.F.C.
- Season: 1964
- Champions: Walterstown; 1st Intermediate Football Championship title
- Relegated: Donaghmore; Navan O'Mahonys 'B'

The 1964 Meath Intermediate Football Championship is the 38th edition of the Meath GAA's premier club Gaelic football tournament for intermediate graded teams in County Meath, Ireland. The tournament consists of 15 teams. The championship starts with a group stage and then progresses to a knock out stage.

Athboy and Ballivor were regraded from the 1963 S.F.C. Drumconrath and Ballinabrackey were promoted after claiming the 1963 Meath Junior Football Championship title and Junior 'A' Divisional runners-up spot respectively. Duleek's application to be promoted was also granted by the Co. Board.

At the end of the season Donaghmore and Navan O'Mahonys 'B's applied to be regraded to the 1965 J.F.C.

On 6 December 1964, Walterstown claimed their 1st Intermediate championship title when they defeated Kilmainhamwood 1-6 to 1-3 in the final at Pairc Tailteann.

== Team changes ==
The following teams have changed division since the 1963 championship season.

=== From I.F.C. ===
Promoted to 1964 S.F.C.

- St. Patrick's - (Intermediate Champions)
- Kells Harps - (Amalgamated with senior club Drumbaragh to form "Gaeil Colmcille")

Relegated to 1964 J.A.F.C.

- Dunderry

=== To I.F.C. ===
Regraded from 1963 S.F.C.

- Athboy
- Ballivor

Promoted from 1963 J.A.F.C. & J.B.F.C.

- Drumconrath - (Junior & Junior 'A' Divisional Champions)
- Ballinabrackey - (Junior 'A' Divisional Runners-Up)
- Duleek - (Application to be promoted from J.A.F.C. approved by the Co. Board)
- Navan O'Mahonys 'B' - (Application to be promoted from J.A.F.C. approved by the Co. Board, also J.A.F.C. North Divisional Champions and J.A.F.C. Semi-Finalists)

== Group stage ==
There are 2 groups called Group A and B. The top finisher in each group will qualify for the Final. Many results were unavailable in the Meath Chronicle.

=== Group A ===
Team	Pld	W	L	D	PF	PA	PD	Pts
Kilmainhamwood	2	2	0	0	0	0	+0	4
Syddan	2	1	1	0	0	0	+0	2
Athboy	2	1	1	0	0	0	+0	2
Rathkenny	1	1	0	0	0	0	+0	2
Drumconrath	1	0	1	0	0	0	+0	0
Slane	1	0	1	0	0	0	+0	0
Castletown	1	0	1	0	0	0	+0	0

Round 1:

- Kilmainhamwood -vs- Slane, Kilberry, 22/3/1964,
- Syddan -vs- Rathkenny, Kilberry, 22/3/1964,
- Athboy 2-9, 4-1 Drumconrath, Kells, 12/4/1964,
- Castletown - Bye,

Round 2:

- Kilmainhamwood 0-8, 1-3 Syddan, Castletown, 5/4/1964,
- Rathkenny 2-5, 2-3 Slane, Castletown, 5/4/1964,
- Castletown -vs- Drumconrath, Kilmainhamwood, 26/4/1964,
- Athboy -Bye,

Round 3:

- Slane -vs- Syddan, Castletown, 12/4/1964,
- Kilmainhamwood -vs- Rathkenny, Castletown, 12/4/1964,
- Castletown -vs- Athboy, Kilberry, 24/5/1964,
- Drumconrath - Bye,

Round 4:

- Rathkenny -vs- Drumconrath, Castletown, 3/5/1964,
- Kilmainhamwood 3-10, 1-3 Athboy, Pairc Tailteann, 21/6/1964,
- Syddan w, l Castletown, Rathkenny, 21/6/1964,
- Slane - Bye,

Round 5:

- Castletown -vs- Rathkenny,
- Athboy -vs- Syddan,
- Drumconrath -vs- Slane,
- Kilmainhamwood - Bye,

Round 6:

- Castletown -vs- Slane,
- Athboy -vs- Rathkenny,
- Drumconrath -vs- Kilmainhamwood,
- Syddan - Bye,

Round 7:

- Athboy -vs- Slane,
- Drumconrath -vs- Syddan,
- Castletown -vs- Kilmainhamwood,
- Rathkenny - Bye,

=== Group B ===
Team	Pld	W	L	D	PF	PA	PD	Pts
Walterstown	4	3	1	0	0	0	+0	6
Ballinabrackey	2	2	0	0	0	0	+0	4
St. Peter's Dunboyne	4	2	2	0	0	0	+0	4
Ballivor	3	1	1	1	0	0	+0	3
Duleek	2	1	0	1	0	0	+0	3
Navan O'Mahonys 'B'	1	0	1	0	0	0	+0	0
Donaghmore	2	0	2	0	0	0	+0	0
Salesian College Warrenstown	2	0	2	0	0	0	+0	0

Round 1:

- St. Peter's Dunboyne 3-2, 0-5 Warrenstown, Skryne, 15/3/1964,
- Walterstown 3-8, 1-5 Navan O'Mahonys 'B', Skryne, 12/4/1964,
- Duleek 3-4, 0-13 Ballivor, Pairc Tailteann, 3/5/1964,
- Ballinabrackey w, l Donaghmore,

Round 2:

- Walterstown -vs- Ballinabrackey, Trim, 26/4/1964,
- Navan O'Mahonys 'B' -vs- Donaghmore, Skryne, 26/4/1964,
- Duleek 5-6, 1-2 Warrenstown, Ratoath, 10/5/1964,
- Ballivor w, l St. Peter's Dunboyne, Trim, 24/5/1964,

Round 3:

- Walterstown w, l Donaghmore, Skryne, 10/5/1964,
- St. Peter's Dunboyne -vs- Duleek, Skryne, 30/8/1964,
- Navan O'Mahonys 'B' -vs- Ballinabrackey,
- Ballivor -vs- Warenstown,

Round 4:

- Donaghmore -vs- Warrenstown, Skryne, 21/6/1964,
- Ballinabrackey -vs- Duleek, Trim, 6/9/1964,
- St. Peter's Dunboyne +13, -13 Walterstown, Trim, 11/10/1964,
- Ballivor -vs- Navan O'Mahonys 'B',

Round 5:

- Ballinabrackey 3-2, 2-4 St. Peter's Dunboyne, Trim, 22/11/1964,
- Walterstown 2-4, 1-4 Ballivor, Pairc Tailteann, 22/11/1964,
- Navan O'Mahonys 'B' -vs- Warrenstown,
- Duleek -vs- Donaghmore,

Round 6:

- St. Peter's Dunboyne -vs- Donaghmore,
- Duleek -vs- Navan O'Mahonys,
- Walterstown -vs- Warrenstown,
- Ballinabrackey -vs- Ballivor,

Round 7:

- St. Peter's Dunboyne -vs- Navan O'Mahonys 'B',
- Ballinabrackey -vs- Warrenstown,
- Walterstown -vs- Duleek,
- Ballivor -vs- Donaghmore,

Final Playoff:

- Walterstown 4-3, 1-3 Ballinabrackey, Trim, 29/11/1964,

== Final ==
- Walterstown 1-6, 1-3 Kilmainhamwood, Pairc Tailteann, 6/12/1964,
