= 1963 Meath Intermediate Football Championship =

Meath I.F.C.
- Season: 1963
- Champions: St. Patrick's; 1st Intermediate Football Championship title
- Relegated: Dunderry

The 1963 Meath Intermediate Football Championship is the 37th edition of the Meath GAA's premier club Gaelic football tournament for intermediate graded teams in County Meath, Ireland. The tournament consists of 12 teams. The championship starts with a group stage and then progresses to a knock out stage.

Donaghmore, St. Peter's Dunboyne and Syddan were regraded from the 1962 S.F.C. Although the St. Peter's Dunboyne 'B' team claimed the 1962 J.F.C. they chose not to enter two teams into the middle grade, and so their second string remained in J.F.C. Southern Division. The Rathkenny club reformed this year and entered Meath GAA competitions for the first time since the 1951 J.F.C. Many of their players joined from the neighbouring Slane and Syddan 1962 squads.

At the end of the season Dunderry applied to be regraded to the 1964 J.F.C. surviving just one year in the middle tier.

On 8 September 1963, St. Patrick's claimed their 1st Intermediate championship title when they defeated Kells Harps 1-6 to 1-3 in the final at Pairc Tailteann.

== Team changes ==
The following teams have changed division since the 1962 championship season.

=== From I.F.C. ===
Promoted to 1963 S.F.C.

- Kilbride - (Intermediate Champions)

Relegated to 1963 J.A.F.C.

- Commons
- Dunshaughlin
- Newtown Blues
- Rathmolyon
- Ratoath
- St. Mary's Bettystown

=== To I.F.C. ===
Regraded from 1962 S.F.C.

- Donaghmore
- St. Peter's Dunboyne
- Syddan

Promoted from 1962 J.A.F.C. & J.B.F.C.

- Castletown - (Application to be promoted from J.A.F.C. approved by the Co. Board, also 1962 J.A.F.C. North Divisional Champions & J.A.F.C. semi-finalists)
- Dunderry - (Application to be promoted from J.A.F.C. approved by the Co. Board)

New Club

- Rathkenny

== Group stage ==
There are 2 groups called Group A and B. The top finisher in each group will qualify for the Final. Some results were unavailable in the Meath Chronicle.

=== Group A ===
Team	Pld	W	L	D	PF	PA	PD	Pts
Kells Harps	5	5	0	0	0	0	+0	10
Kilmainhamwood	5	4	1	0	0	0	+0	8
Slane	5	3	2	0	0	0	+0	6
Syddan	5	2	3	0	0	0	+0	4
Rathkenny	5	1	4	0	0	0	+0	2
Castletown	5	0	5	0	0	0	+0	0

Round 1:

- Kilmainhamwood 1-8, 0-5 Slane, Castletown, 5/5/1963,
- Syddan 2-9, 3-3 Rathkenny, Castletown, 5/5/1963,
- Kells Harps w, l Castletown, Carlanstown, 12/5/1963,

Round 2:

- Slane 3-6, 1-2 Syddan, Castletown, 12/5/1963,
- Rathkenny 2-4, 1-6 Castletown, Kells, 10/6/1963,
- Kells Harps 2-6, 1-4 Kilmainhamwood, Pairc Tailteann, 30/6/1963,

Round 3:

- Slane 1-6, 0-3 Rathkenny, Kilberry, 7/7/1963,
- Kells Harps 3-5, 1-9 Syddan, Kilberry, 7/7/1963,
- Kilmainhamwood w, l Castletown, Kilberry, 14/7/1963,

Round 4:

- Syddan 2-13, 0-5 Castletown, Rathkenny, 21/7/1963,
- Kilmainhamwood w/o, scr Rathkenny, Kilberry, 21/7/1963,
- Kells Harps w, l Slane, Pairc Tailteann, 25/8/1963,

Round 5:

- Kilmainhamwood w/o, scr Syddan, Kilberry, 25/8/1963,
- Slane w/o, scr Castletown,
- Kells Harps w/o, scr Rathkenny,

=== Group B ===
Team	Pld	W	L	D	PF	PA	PD	Pts
St. Patrick's	5	5	0	0	0	0	+0	10
St. Peter's Dunboyne	5	4	1	0	0	0	+0	8
Walterstown	5	3	2	0	0	0	+0	6
Donaghmore	4	1	3	0	0	0	+0	2
Dunderry	4	1	3	0	0	0	+0	2
Salesian College Warrenstown	5	0	5	0	0	0	+0	0

Round 1:

- Dunderry w, l Warrenstown, Kilmessan, 12/5/1963,
- St. Patrick's w, l St. Peter's Dunboyne, Skryne, 12/5/1963,
- Walterstown w, l Donaghmore, Dunshaughlin, 12/5/1963,

Round 2:

- Walterstown w, l Warrenstown, Skryne, 10/6/1963,
- St. Patrick's w, l Donaghmore, Ardcath, 10/6/1963,
- St. Peter's Dunboyne 0-6, 0-4 Dunderry, Skryne, 24/6/1963,

Round 3:

- St. Patrick's 2-10, 0-4 Dunderry, Seneschalstown, 7/7/1963,
- St. Peter's Dunboyne w, l Walterstown, Kilmessan, 7/7/1963,
- Donaghmore w/o, scr Warrenstown,

Round 4:

- Walterstown w, l Dunderry, Kilmessan, 14/7/1963,
- St. Peter's Dunboyne 1-16, 1-2 Donaghmore, Dunshaughlin, 21/7/1963,
- St. Patrick's w/o, scr Warrenstown,

Round 5:

- St. Patrick's w, l Walterstown, Skryne, 21/7/1963,
- St. Peter's Dunboyne w/o, scr Warrenstown,
- Dunderry -vs- Donaghmore,

== Final ==
- St. Patrick's 1-6, 1-3 Kells Harps, Pairc Tailteann, 6/12/1964,
