= 1966 Meath Intermediate Football Championship =

Meath I.F.C.
- Season: 1966
- Champions: Duleek; 3rd Intermediate Football Championship title
- Relegated: Kilberry; St. Peter's Dunboyne

The 1966 Meath Intermediate Football Championship is the 40th edition of the Meath GAA's premier club Gaelic football tournament for intermediate graded teams in County Meath, Ireland. The tournament consists of 16 teams. The championship starts with a group stage and then progresses to a knock out stage.

No team was regraded from the 1965 S.F.C. Bohermeen, Oldcastle and Donaghmore were promoted after claiming the 1965 Meath Junior Football Championship title, runners-up spot and Junior 'A' Divisional runners-up spot respectively. Rathmolyon's application to be promoted was also granted by the Co. Board.

At the end of the season Kilberry and St. Peter's Dunboyne applied to be regraded to the 1967 J.F.C.

On 29 October 1967, Seneschalstown claimed their 2nd Intermediate championship title when they defeated Bohermeen 0-11 to 0-3 in the final at Pairc Tailteann.

== Team changes ==
The following teams have changed division since the 1965 championship season.

=== From I.F.C. ===
Promoted to 1966 S.F.C.

- Kilmainhamwood - (Intermediate Champions)

Relegated to 1966 J.A.F.C.

- Athboy
- Carlanstown
- Drumconrath
- Gaeil Colmcille 'B'

=== To I.F.C. ===
Regraded from 1965 S.F.C.

- None

Promoted from 1965 J.A.F.C. & J.B.F.C.

- Bohermeen - (Junior & Junior 'B' Divisional Champions)
- Oldcastle - (Junior Runners-Up & Junior 'A' Divisional Champions)
- Donaghmore - (Junior 'A' Divisional Runners-Up)
- Rathmolyon - (Application to be promoted approved by the Co. Board)

== Group stage ==
There are 4 groups called Group A, B, C and D. The top finisher in each group will qualify for the Semi-Finals. Many results were unavailable in the Meath Chronicle.

=== Group A ===
Team	Pld	W	L	D	PF	PA	PD	Pts
Bohermeen	3	2	0	1	0	0	+0	5
Martry	3	2	1	0	0	0	+0	4
Oldcastle	3	1	1	1	0	0	+0	3
Kilberry	3	0	3	0	0	0	+0	0

Round 1:

- Bohermeen 0-5, 0-5 Oldcastle, Kells, 29/4/1966,
- Martry w, l Kilberry, Gibbstown, 29/4/1966,

Round 2:

- Bohermeen w, l Kilberry, Gibbstown, 12/6/1966,
- Martry +3, -3 Oldcastle, Kells, 3/7/1966,

Round 3:

- Bohermeen 0-8, 1-4 Martry, Kells, 28/8/1966,
- Oldcastle w/o, scr Kilberry,

=== Group B ===
Team	Pld	W	L	D	PF	PA	PD	Pts
Duleek	3	1	0	2	0	0	+0	4
Slane	3	1	0	2	0	0	+0	4
Syddan	2	0	1	1	0	0	+0	1
Rathkenny	2	0	1	1	0	0	+0	1

Round 1:

- Duleek w, l Syddan, Castletown, 24/4/1966,
- Slane w, l Rathkenny, Castletown, 24/4/1966,

Round 2:

- Slane d, d Syddan, Castletown, 1/5/1966,
- Duleek d, d Rathkenny, Castletown, 12/6/1966,

Round 3:

- Syddan -vs- Rathkenny, Castletown, 19/6/1966,
- Slane d, d Duleek, Pairc Tailteann, 3/7/1966,

Semi-Final Playoff:

- Duleek 2-7, 0-7 Slane, Pairc Tailteann, 31/7/1966,

=== Group C ===
Team	Pld	W	L	D	PF	PA	PD	Pts
Ballivor	3	3	0	0	0	0	+0	6
Ballinabrackey	2	1	1	0	0	0	+0	2
Enfield	2	1	1	0	0	0	+0	2
Rathmolyon	3	0	3	0	0	0	+0	0

Round 1:

- Enfield w, l Rathmolyon, Trim, 24/4/1966,
- Ballivor w, l Ballinabrackey, Trim, 3/7/1966,

Round 2:

- Ballivor w, l Enfield, Trim, 31/7/1966,
- Ballinabrackey w, l Rathmolyon, Trim, 31/7/1966,

Round 3:

- Ballivor w/o, scr Rathmolyon,
- Enfield -vs- Ballinabrackey,

=== Group D ===
Team	Pld	W	L	D	PF	PA	PD	Pts
Seneschalstown	3	3	0	0	0	0	+0	6
Donaghmore	1	0	1	0	0	0	+0	0
Salesian College Warrenstown	1	0	1	0	0	0	+0	0
St. Peter's Dunboyne	1	0	1	0	0	0	+0	0

Round 1:

- Seneschalstown w, l Donaghmore, Skryne, 24/4/1966,
- Warrenstown -vs- St. Peter's Dunboyne, Drumree, 22/5/1966,

Round 2:

- Seneschalstown w, l Warrenstown, Curraha, 19/6/1966,
- Donaghmore -vs- St. Peter's Dunboyne, Drumree, 19/6/1966,

Round 3:

- Seneschalstown w, l St. Peter's Dunboyne, Skryne, 3/7/1966,
- Donaghmore -vs- Warrenstown,

== Knock-out Stages ==
The teams in the Semi-Finals are the first and second placed teams from each group.

Semi-Finals
Bohermeen	0-2
Duleek	1-6
Ballivor	2-11
Seneschalstown	1-5

Final
Duleek	5-7
Ballivor	2-7

Semi-Final:

- Duleek 1-6, 0-2 Bohermeen, Pairc Tailteann, 4/9/1966,
- Ballivor 2-11, 1-5 Seneschalstown, Pairc Tailteann, 4/9/1966,

Final:

- Duleek 5-7, 2-7 Ballivor, Pairc Tailteann, 9/10/1966,
