= Moynalty GFC =

Gaelic sports club in County Meath, Ireland

Moynalty
- Magh nEalta
- County: Meath
- Colours
- Grounds: Bellair Grounds

Playing kits
Standard colours

Senior Club Championships
	All Ireland	Leinster champions	Meath champions
Football:	0	0	2

Moynalty GFC is a Gaelic Athletic Association club in Moynalty, County Meath, Ireland. The club is affiliated to the Meath County Board and fields teams primarily in Gaelic football.

== History ==
Located in the village of Moynalty, around 8 km from Kells, Moynalty GFC was founded at some point during the 1880s. The club has being under the name of Moynalty Owen Roes, St Mary's and as it is nowadays Moynalty.

Moynalty competed in six county finals in the 1930s, three Meath SFC finals, two Meath IFC finals, and one Meath JFC final. Moynalty won two Meath SFC titles during this period, each in 1932 and 1937, while as coming up short in the 1938 SFC final. Moynalty also won two Meath IFC titles in the 1930s, each in 1931 and 1936. They also lost a Meath JFC final in 1930.

As of 2026, Moynalty last one a championship title in 1987, beating Cortown in the Meath JFC final. Since Moynalty's relegation from the Meath IFC in 2001, Moynalty have never played above the Junior ranks, and in 2004 were relegated from the Meath JFC to the Meath JBFC. Since then, Moynalty have competed in seven Meath JBFC finals, losing all of them. As of 2026, Moynalty compete in the Meath JBFC.

== Honours ==
=== Moynalty ===
- Meath Senior Football Championship (1): 1932, 1937 (runners-up in 1938)
- Meath Intermediate Football Championship (2): 1931, 1936
- Meath Junior 'A' Football Championship (1): 1987 (runners-up in 1930, 1947, 1980, 1983, 1984, 1985)
- Meath Junior 'B' Football Championship (0): (runners-up in 2009, 2010, 2013, 2016, 2023, 2024, 2025)

== Notable Players ==
- Matt Gilsenan: Leinster SFC-winner (1939, 1940)

Preceded by Kilmessan	Meath Senior Football Champions; 1937	Succeeded by Navan Gaels
