= 1950 Meath Senior Football Championship =

Meath S.F.C.
- Season: 1950
- Champions: North Meath; 58th Senior Championship Title
- Relegated: St. Mary's Kilbeg
- Winning Captain: ???

The 1950 Meath Senior Football Championship is the 58th edition of the Meath GAA's premier club Gaelic football tournament for senior graded teams in County Meath, Ireland. The tournament consists of 8 teams. The championship starts with a divisional stage (based on region) and then progresses to a final.

This was Navan O'Mahonys first year ever as a senior club after claiming the 1949 Meath Junior Football Championship title. This was only their 3rd year in existence as a club since being founded in 1948 and only their 2nd year of competitive activity. This was also Trim's return to the senior ranks after claiming the 1949 Meath Intermediate Football Championship title.

Syddan were the defending champions after they defeated North Meath in the previous years final, however North Meath (an amalgamation including the finest players from Intermediate club Moynalty along with Junior clubs Castletown, Drumconrath/Meath Hill Brian Boru's, Kilberry, Kilmainhamwood, Nobber and Rathkenny - These were clubs all part of the North Meath GAA District Board) exacted revenge by ending Syddan's reign at the Divisional Final stage.

North Meath's line up included 1949 All-Ireland medalists such as Paddy Connell (Moynalty), Séamus Heery (Rathkenny), Larry McGuinness (Nobber) and Pat Carolan (Kilmainhamwood).

On 10 September 1950, North Meath won their first ever Senior championship title when they defeated Skryne on a 2–4 to 1–3 scoreline at Pairc Tailteann.

== Team changes ==
The following teams have changed division since the 1949 championship season.

=== To S.F.C. ===
Promoted from 1949 I.F.C.

- Trim - (Intermediate Champions)

Promoted from 1949 J.F.C.

- Navan O'Mahonys - (Junior Champions)

=== From S.F.C. ===
Regraded to 1950 I.F.C.

- Ardcath
- Dunderry

Regraded to 1950 J.F.C.

- Drumconrath Brian Boru's

== Group stage ==
=== Division A ===
Team	Pld	W	L	D	Pts
North Meath	3	2	1	0	4
Syddan	3	2	1	0	4
Oldcastle	3	1	1	1	3
St. Mary's Kilbeg	3	0	2	1	1

Round 1

- North Meath 3-13, 3-8 Syddan, Lobinstown, 12/3/1950,
- Oldcastle 4–6, 4-6 St. Mary's Kilbeg, Kells, 12/3/1950,

Round 2

- Oldcastle 3-11, 1-5 North Meath, Kells, 26/3/1950,
- Syddan 2-12, 0-5 St. Mary's Kilbeg, Kells, 16/7/1950,

Round 3

- North Meath w, l St. Mary's Kilbeg,
- Syddan 2-8, 0-3 Oldcastle, Kells, 30/7/1950,

Divisional Final:

- North Meath 2-9, 1-9 Syddan, Kells, 27/8/1950,

=== Division B ===
Team	Pld	W	L	D	Pts
Skryne	3	3	0	0	6
Trim	3	2	1	0	4
Navan O'Mahonys	3	1	2	0	2
Ballivor	3	0	3	0	0

Round 1

- Navan O'Mahonys 5-3, 3-1 Ballivor, Trim, 12/3/1950,
- Skryne 2-11, 0-3 Trim, Kilmessan, 7/5/1950,

Round 2

- Trim w, l Navan O'Mahonys, Dunderry, 16/7/1950,
- Skryne w, l Ballivor, Trim, 30/7/1950,

Round 3

- Skryne w, l Navan O'Mahonys, Skryne, 27/8/1950,
- Trim w, l Ballivor, Rathmolyon,

== Final ==
10 September 1950
Final

North Meath	2-4 - 1-3	Skryne

Pairc Tailteann
