= 1962 Meath Senior Football Championship =

Meath S.F.C.
- Season: 1962
- Champions: Trim; 1st Senior Championship Title
- Relegated: Donaghmore; St. Peter's Dunboyne; Syddan
- Winning Captain: Peter Darby (Trim)

The 1962 Meath Senior Football Championship is the 70th edition of the Meath GAA's premier club Gaelic football tournament for senior graded teams in County Meath, Ireland. The tournament consists of 13 teams. The championship employed a straight knock-out format.

This season saw Drumree's debut in the top flight after claiming the 1961 Meath Intermediate Football Championship title.

Navan O'Mahonys were the defending champions after they defeated Trim in the previous years final, however they lost their crown to Skryne in a Quarter-final Replay.

Trim claimed their 1st and only S.F.C. title on 11 November 1962 when defeating Ballinlough in the final by 3-8 to 0-7 at Pairc Tailteann. Peter Darby raised the Keegan Cup for the reds.

At the end of the season Donaghmore, St. Peter's Dunboyne and Syddan were regraded to the 1963 I.F.C. after 3, 11 and 22 years respectively as senior clubs.

== Team changes ==
The following teams have changed division since the 1961 championship season.

=== To S.F.C. ===
Promoted from 1961 I.F.C.

- Drumree - (Intermediate Champions).

=== From S.F.C. ===
Regraded to 1962 I.F.C.

- Kells Harps
- St. Mary's Bettystown

== First round ==
8 teams enter this round selected by random draw. The winner progresses to the quarter-finals.

- Drumree +3, -3 St. Vincent's, Skryne, 15/4/1962,
- Skryne 4-12, 0-4 Donaghmore, Dunshaughlin, 15/4/1962,
- Navan O'Mahonys w/o, scr St. Peter's Dunboyne, Skryne, 13/5/1962,
- Trim 1-10, 1-5 Syddan, Kells, 8/7/1962,

== Quarter-finals ==
The remaining 5 clubs along with the Round 1 winners enter this round.

- Ballinlough 3-4, 0-3 Athboy, Kells, 15/4/1962,
- Skryne 1-6, 1-5 Navan O'Mahonys, Trim, 8/7/1962, *
- Drumbaragh 0-10, 1-7 Drumree, Pairc Tailteann, 8/7/1962,
- Trim w, l Ballivor, Kildalkey, 22/7/1962,
- Drumbaragh 2-5, 0-4 Drumree, Pairc Tailteann, 5/8/1962, (Replay)
- Skryne 1-7, 1-1 Navan O'Mahonys, Kells, 16/9/1963, (Replay)

The match between Skryne and Navan O'Mahonys held up proceedings in the S.F.C. after referee Gerry Twomey (Kilmainhamwood) admitted to a mistake in timing, stating that he played 3 minutes less than regulation. On 1 August 1962 Navan O'Mahonys appealed the result to the Leinster Council after Meath County Board delegated out-voted the Navan sides proposal of a replay. At the Leinster Council meeting, a re-fixture was ordered although Meath delegates Mr. Jack Fitzgerald or Mr. Brian Smith (Skryne) were present.

== Semi-finals ==
- Ballinlough 1-12, 0-4 Drumbaragh, Pairc Tailteann, 19/8/1962,
- Trim 2-5, 0-5 Skryne, Pairc Tailteann, 28/10/1962,

== Final ==
- Trim 3-8, 0-7 Ballinlough, Pairc Tailteann, 11/11/1962,
