= 1964 Meath Senior Football Championship =

Meath S.F.C.
- Season: 1964
- Champions: Kilbride; 1st Senior Championship Title
- Relegated: None
- Winning Captain: Edward O'Sullivan (Kilbride)
- Matches: 40

The 1964 Meath Senior Football Championship is the 72nd edition of the Meath GAA's premier club Gaelic football tournament for senior graded teams in County Meath, Ireland. The tournament consists of nine teams. The championship employed a straight knock-out format.

This season saw St. Patrick's debut in the top flight after claiming the 1963 Meath Intermediate Football Championship title.

Navan O'Mahonys were the defending champions after they defeated St. Vincent's in the previous years final, however they lost their crown to Drumree at the quarter-final stage.

This was Gaeil Colmcille's first year in existence (formed from Senior club Drumbaragh and Intermediate outfit Kells Harps). A fallout from this amalgamation formed the Kilmainham club located in the same parish, however they didn't enter any championships until the 1965 season. Almost 10 years later in 1974 a new Drumbaragh Emmets club was formed after a dispute within the Gaeil Colmcille club, ultimately forming the third of the current three Kells parish clubs: Gaeil Colmcille, Drumbaragh Emmets and Kilmainham.

Kilbride claimed their 1st S.F.C. title on 25 October 1964 when defeating Gaeil Colmcille in the final by 1–8 to 0–8 at Pairc Tailteann. Edward O'Sullivan raised the Keegan Cup for the Dunboyne parish outfit. An attendance of 4,496 turned up for the showpiece of Meath club football.

== Team changes ==
The following teams have changed division since the 1963 championship season.

=== To S.F.C. ===
Promoted from I.F.C.

- St. Patrick's - (Intermediate Champions).

=== From S.F.C. ===
Regraded to I.F.C.

- Athboy
- Ballivor

== First round ==
Two teams (one random and the previous years I.F.C. champions) enter this round. The winner progresses to the quarter-finals.

- Navan O'Mahonys 3-10, 0-5 St. Patrick's, Skryne, 12/4/1964,

== Quarter-finals ==
The remaining 7 clubs along with the Round 1 winner enter this round.

- Kilbride 2-7, 2-4 St. Vincent's, Pairc Tailteann, 5/4/1964,
- Trim 3-9, 0-3 Skryne, Pairc Tailteann, 12/4/1964,
- Gaeil Colmcille 0-8, 0-5 Ballinlough, Pairc Tailteann, 12/4/1964,
- Drumree 0-11, 1-3 Navan O'Mahonys, Skryne, 26/4/1964,

== Semi-finals ==
- Kilbride 2-8, 1-5 Trim, Pairc Tailteann, 20/9/1964,
- Gaeil Colmcille 3-11, 1-8 Drumree, Pairc Tailteann, 20/9/1964,

== Final ==
- Kilbride 1-8, 0-8 Gaeil Colmcille, Pairc Tailteann, 25/10/1964,
