= 1955 Meath Senior Football Championship =

Meath S.F.C.
- Season: 1955
- Champions: St. Vincent's; 1st Senior Championship Title
- Relegated: Fordstown
- Winning Captain: Kevin Mooney (Syddan)
- Matches: 13

The 1955 Meath Senior Football Championship was the 63rd edition of the Meath GAA's premier club Gaelic football tournament for senior-graded teams in County Meath, Ireland. The tournament featured 11 teams, competing in a group stage followed by a final between the group winners.

This season saw Ballinlough's debut in the top flight after claiming the 1954 Meath Intermediate Football Championship title. Fordstown also made their debut in the grade after claiming the 1954 J.F.C. title.

Skryne, the defending champions, had defeated Kells Harps in the previous year's final but lost their crown by failing to progress past the group stages.

St. Vincent's claimed their 1st S.F.C. title by defeating Kells Harps in the final at Pairc Tailteann by 1-12 to 2-3 on 23 October 1955. Kevin Mooney lifted the Keegan Cup for the Dublin border side. This was the first match to be played in the renovated Pairc Tailteann.

At the end of the season, newly promoted Fordstown were regraded to the 1956 I.F.C.

== Team changes ==
The following teams have changed division since the 1954 championship season.

=== To S.F.C. ===
Promoted from 1954 I.F.C.

- Ballinlough - (Intermediate Champions).

Promoted from 1954 J.F.C.

- Fordstown - (Junior Champions).

=== From S.F.C. ===
Regraded to 1955 I.F.C.

- Dunshaughlin
- Oldcastle
- St. Patrick's

=== Group A ===
Team	Pld	W	L	D	PF	PA	PD	Pts
St. Vincent's	4	4	0	0	0	0	+0	8
Skryne	3	1	1	1	0	0	+0	3
Trim	4	1	2	1	0	0	+0	3
St. Peter's Dunboyne	4	1	3	0	0	0	+0	2
Donaghmore	3	1	2	0	0	0	+0	2

Round 1:

- Donaghmore 2-4, 1-5 Trim, Pairc Tailteann, 5/6/1955,
- Skryne 1-16, 1-4 St. Peter's Dunboyne, Trim, 5/6/1955,
- St. Vincent's - Bye,

Round 2:

- St. Vincent's 0-12, 0-8 Donaghmore, Skryne, 24/6/1955,
- Skryne 2-8, 4-2 Trim, Pairc Tailteann, 17/7/1955,
- St. Peter's Dunboyne - Bye,

Round 3:

- Trim w, l St. Peter's Dunboyne, Drumree, 14/8/1955,
- St. Vincent's w, l Skryne, Ashbourne, 14/8/1955,
- Donaghmore - Bye,

Round 4:

- St. Vincent's 2-9, 2-3 Trim, Skryne, 28/8/1955,
- St. Peter's Dunboyne 0-9, 0-5 Donaghmore, Drumree, 28/8/1955,
- Skryne - Bye,

Round 5:

- St. Vincent's w, l St. Peter's Dunboyne, Skryne, 9/10/1955,
- Skryne -vs- Donaghmore,
- Trim - Bye,

=== Group B ===
Team	Pld	W	L	D	PF	PA	PD	Pts
Kells Harps	5	4	1	0	0	0	+0	8
Ballinlough	5	4	1	0	0	0	+0	8
Navan O'Mahonys	5	3	2	0	0	0	+0	6
Fordstown	4	1	3	0	0	0	+0	2
Syddan	5	1	4	0	0	0	+0	2
Ballivor	3	0	3	0	0	0	+0	0

Round 1:

- Navan O'Mahonys 2-10, 0-4 Syddan, Kells, 6/3/1955,
- Ballinlough 1-8, 1-3 Kells Harps, Kells, 1/5/1955,
- Ballivor -vs- Fordstown,

Round 2:

- Navan O'Mahonys 1-9, 0-4 Fordstown, Kells, 15/5/1955,
- Ballinlough 3-7, 0-6 Syddan, Pairc Tailteann, 5/6/1955,
- Kells Harps 1-9, 0-4 Ballivor, Athboy, 5/6/1955,

Round 3:

- Syddan 2-3, 1-3 Ballivor, Pairc Tailteann, 26/6/1955,
- Kells Harps 4-7, 1-3 Fordstown, Kilskyre, 10/7/1955,
- Navan O'Mahonys 1-11, 2-6 Ballinlough, Kells, 17/7/1955,

Round 4:

- Fordstown 1-8, 1-3 Syddan, Pairc Tailteann, 17/7/1955,
- Ballinlough 0-8, 1-3 Ballivor, Athboy, 14/8/1955,
- Kells Harps 0-7, 0-6 Navan O'Mahonys, Trim, 28/8/1955,

Round 5:

- Ballinlough 2-10, 0-4 Fordstown, Kells, 28/8/1955,
- Kells Harps w/o, scr Syddan, Kilmainhamwood, 4/9/1955,
- Navan O'Mahonys -vs- Ballivor,

Final Play-offs:

- Kells Harps 0-11, 0-10 Ballinlough, Kells, 9/10/1955,

== Final ==
- St. Vincent's 1-12, 2-3 Kells Harps, Pairc Tailteann, 23/10/1955,
