= 1963 Meath Senior Football Championship =

Meath S.F.C.
- Season: 1963
- Champions: Navan O'Mahonys; 7th Senior Championship Title
- Relegated: Athboy; Ballivor
- Winning Captain: Paddy Fitzsimons (Navan O'Mahonys)

The 1964 Meath Senior Football Championship is the 71st edition of the Meath GAA's premier club Gaelic football tournament for senior graded teams in County Meath, Ireland. The tournament consists of 10 teams. The championship employed a straight knock-out format.

This season saw Kilbride's debut in the top flight after claiming the 1962 Meath Intermediate Football Championship title. The famous Bohermeen club which won 6 S.F.C. title in a row (1909-1914) was reformed this year and entered the J.B.F.C. ranks. This was Athboy parish rivals Martinstown and Rathmore's first year in existence, both of whom entered the J.F.C.

Trim were the defending champions after they defeated Ballinlough in the previous years final, however they lost their crown to Navan O'Mahonys at the First Round stage.

Navan O'Mahonys claimed their 7th S.F.C. (in 11 years) title on 25 August 1963 when defeating St. Vincent's in the final by 4-6 to 1-2 at Pairc Tailteann. Paddy Fitzsimons raised the Keegan Cup for the Navan parish outfit.

At the end of the season Athboy and Ballivor were regraded to the 1964 I.F.C. after 3 and 15 years respectively as senior clubs.

== Team changes ==
The following teams have changed division since the 1962 championship season.

=== To S.F.C. ===
Promoted from I.F.C.

- Kilbride - (Intermediate Champions).

=== From S.F.C. ===
Regraded to I.F.C.

- Donaghmore
- St. Peter's Dunboyne
- Syddan

== First round ==
Four teams enter this round selected by random draw. The winner progresses to the quarter-finals.

- Skryne 4-5, 0-4 Ballivor, Trim, 12/5/1963,
- Navan O'Mahonys 2-2, 0-3 Trim, Kells, 12/5/1963,

== Quarter-finals ==
The remaining 6 clubs along with the Round 1 winner enter this round.

- St. Vincent's 1-9, 1-2 Athboy, Pairc Tailteann, 12/5/1963,
- Kilbride 1-7, 1-5 Ballinlough, Pairc Tailteann, 12/5/1963,
- Navan O'Mahonys 2-6, 2-5 Drumree, Trim, 10/6/1963,
- Skryne 0-12, 1-8 Drumbaragh, Pairc Tailteann, 7/7/1963,

== Semi-finals ==
- St. Vincent's 2-7, 1-5 Kilbride, Pairc Tailteann, 10/6/1963,
- Navan O'Mahonys 3-4, 2-7 Skryne, Kells, 14/7/1963,
- Navan O'Mahonys 1-6, 1-4 Skryne, Kells, 21/7/1963, (Replay)

== Final ==
- Navan O'Mahonys 4-6, 1-2 St. Vincent's, Pairc Tailteann, 25/8/1963,
