= 1958 Meath Intermediate Football Championship =

Meath I.F.C.
- Season: 1958
- Champions: St. Mary's Bettystown; 1st Intermediate Football Championship title
- Relegated: Kilberry; Ratoath; Summerhill

The 1958 Meath Intermediate Football Championship is the 32nd edition of the Meath GAA's premier club Gaelic football tournament for intermediate graded teams in County Meath, Ireland. The tournament consists of 10 teams. The championship format consists of a group stage before progressing to a knock-out stage.

This was the first year that the Junior 'B' (or Division II) Championship was implemented.

No team was regraded from the 1957 S.F.C.

At the end of the season Kilberry, Ratoath and Summerhill applied to be regraded to the 1959 J.A.F.C.

On 2 November 1958, St. Mary's Bettystown claimed their 1st Intermediate championship title when they defeated Fordstown 3-5 to 2-4 in the final at Pairc Tailteann.

== Team changes ==
The following teams have changed division since the 1957 championship season.

=== From I.F.C. ===
Promoted to 1958 S.F.C.

- Carnaross - (Intermediate Champions)

Relegated to 1958 J.A.F.C.

- Drumbaragh
- Navan O'Mahonys 'B'
- Nobber
- Shale Rovers
- Syddan 'B'
- Trim 'B'

Relegated to 1958 J.B.F.C.

- Salesian College Warrenstown

=== To I.F.C. ===
Regraded from 1957 S.F.C.

- Donaghmore

Promoted from 1957 J.F.C.

- Athboy - (Junior Champions)
- Castletown - (Junior Runners-Up)
- St. Mary's Bettystown - (Junior Semi-Finalists)
- Ballinabrackey - (Junior Semi-Finalists)

== Group stage ==
There are 2 groups called Group A and B. The top finisher in each group will qualify for the Final. Many results were unavailable in the Meath Chronicle.

=== Group A ===
Team	Pld	W	L	D	PF	PA	PD	Pts
St. Mary's Bettystown	2	2	0	0	0	0	+0	4
Donaghmore	0	0	0	0	0	0	+0	0
Slane	3	1	1	1	0	0	+0	3
Castletown	2	0	1	1	0	0	+0	1
Duleek	1	0	1	0	0	0	+0	0
Kilberry	0	0	0	0	0	0	+0	0

Round 1:

- Slane 0-3, 0-3 Castletown, Pairc Tailteann, 16/3/1958,
- Duleek -vs- Kilberry, Skryne, 23/3/1958,
- Bettystown -vs- Donaghmore, Stamullen, 4/5/1958,

Round 2:

- Bettystown -vs- Duleek, Skryne, 25/5/1958,
- Donaghmore -vs- Slane, Skryne, 25/5/1958,
- Castletown -vs- Kilberry, Gibbstown, 20/4/1958,

Round 3:

- Slane 0-10, 0-4 Duleek, Pairc Tailteann, 8/6/1958,
- Bettystown -vs- Kilberry, Skryne, 6/7/1958,
- Donaghmore -vs- Castletown,

Round 4:

- Kilberry -vs- Slane, Pairc Tailteann, 13/7/1958,
- Bettystown 0-6, 1-2 Castletown, Pairc Tailteann, 10/8/1958, *
- Donaghmore -vs- Duleek, Skryne, 10/8/1958,

Round 5:

- Donaghmore -vs- Kilberry, Skryne, 17/8/1958,
- Bettystown 3-1, 0-6 Slane, Pairc Tailteann, 24/8/1958,
- Castletown -vs- Duleek,

- The match between St. Mary's Bettystown and Castletown was originally fixed for Lougher on 13 July 1958, however the match was abandoned with 15 minutes remaining due to the crossbar breaking.

=== Group B ===
Team	Pld	W	L	D	PF	PA	PD	Pts
Fordstown	3	3	0	0	0	0	+0	6
Ballinabrackey	2	1	1	0	0	0	+0	2
Oldcastle	3	1	2	0	0	0	+0	2
Athboy	1	1	0	0	0	0	+0	2
Summerhill	2	0	2	0	0	0	+0	0
Ratoath	1	0	1	0	0	0	+0	0

Round 1:

- Fordstown 3-6, 1-4 Oldcastle, Kells, 16/3/1958,
- Summerhill -vs- Ratoath, Drumree, 23/3/1958,
- Ballinabrackey -vs- Athboy, Trim, 29/6/1958,

Round 2:

- Oldcastle 3-6, 1-7 Ratoath, Pairc Tailteann, 4/5/1958,
- Ballinabrackey -vs- Summerhill, Trim, 13/7/1958,
- Fordstown -vs- Athboy, Pairc Tailteann, 13/7/1958,

Round 3:

- Athboy 2-6, 2-5 Sumerhill, Trim, 10/8/1958,
- Fordstown -vs Ratoath, Pairc Tailteann, 10/8/1958,
- Ballinabrackey 6-5, 2-3 Oldcastle, Pairc Tailteann, 7/9/1958,

Round 4:

- Oldcastle -vs- Athboy, Kells, 28/8/1958,
- Ballinabrackey -vs- Ratoath,
- Fordstown 5-5, 0-6 Summerhill, Trim, 7/9/1958,

Round 5:

- Fordstown 2-4, 1-4 Ballinabrackey, Pairc Tailteann, 26/10/1958, *
- Oldcastle -vs- Summerhill,
- Athboy -vs- Ratoath,

- The match between Fordstown and Ballinabrackey was originally scheduled for Trim on 21 September 1958, however the game was abandoned after 26 minutes due to a torrential downpour in the midst of a thunderstorm. The scores were tied at 0-1 each.

== Final ==
- St. Mary's Bettystown 3-5, 2-4 Fordstown, Pairc Tailteann, 2/11/1958.
