= 1965 Meath Senior Football Championship =

Meath S.F.C.
- Season: 1965
- Champions: Skryne; 8th Senior Championship Title
- Relegated: None
- Winning Captain: David Carty (Skryne)
- Matches: 40

The 1965 Meath Senior Football Championship is the 73rd edition of the Meath GAA's premier club Gaelic football tournament for senior graded teams in County Meath, Ireland. The tournament consists of 9 teams. The championship starts with a group stage and then a subsequent final. The format varied from the previous six championships which employed a straight knock-out format.

This season saw Walterstown's debut in the top flight after claiming the 1964 Meath Intermediate Football Championship title.

Kilbride were the defending champions after they defeated Gaeil Colmcille in the previous years final.

Skryne claimed their 8th S.F.C. title on 8 November 1965 by the Co. Board after controversy in the final on 24 October 1965 warranted the abandonment of the fixture.

== Team changes ==
The following teams have changed division since the 1964 championship season.

=== To S.F.C. ===
Promoted from I.F.C.

- Walterstown - (Intermediate Champions).

=== From S.F.C. ===
Regraded to I.F.C.

- None

== Group stage ==
=== Group A ===
Team	Pld	W	L	D	PF	PA	PD	Pts
Kilbride	4	4	0	0	0	0	+0	8
Gaeil Colmcille	4	2	2	0	0	0	+0	4
Walterstown	2	1	1	0	0	0	+0	2
Trim	2	0	2	0	0	0	+0	0
Navan O'Mahonys	2	0	2	0	0	0	+0	0

Round 1:

- Kilbride 2-6, 2-2 Navan O'Mahonys, Kilmessan, 23/5/1965,
- Gaeil Colmcille 3-14, 2-3 Trim, Pairc Tailteann, 20/6/1965,
- Walterstown - Bye,

Round 2:

- Kilbride 3-9, 1-4 Walterstown, Trim, 20/6/1965,
- Gaeil Colmcille 0-9, 0-1 Navan O'Mahonys, Trim, 24/8/1965,
- Trim - Bye,

Round 3:

- Walterstown 3-7, 1-3 Gaeil Colmcille, Pairc Tailteann, 12/9/1965,
- Navan O'Mahonys -vs- Trim, Trim, 12/9/1965,
- Kilbride - Bye,

Round 4:

- Kilbride w/o, scr Trim,
- Navan O'Mahonys -vs- Waltesrtown,
- Gaeil Colmcille - Bye,

Round 5:

- Kilbride 0-9, 0-4 Gaeil Colmcille, Pairc Tailteann, 10/10/1965,
- Trim -vs- Walterstown,
- Navan O'Mahonys - Bye,

=== Group B ===
Team	Pld	W	L	D	PF	PA	PD	Pts
Skryne	4	4	0	0	0	0	+0	8
St. Patrick's	3	2	1	0	0	0	+0	4
St. Vincent's	2	0	2	0	0	0	+0	0
Drumree	2	0	2	0	0	0	+0	0
Ballinlough	3	0	3	0	0	0	+0	0

Round 1:

- St. Patrick's 1-7, 0-4 St. Vincent's, Skryne, 2/5/1965,
- Skryne 1-5, 0-6 Ballinlough, Kells, 20/6/1965,
- Drumree - Bye,

Round 2:

- Drumree 1-8, 1-5 Ballinlough, Pairc Tailteann, 1/8/1965,
- Skryne 0-18, 0-8 St. Vincent's, Pairc Tailteann, 15/8/1965,
- St. Patrick's - Bye,

Round 3:

- Skryne 0-10, 1-4 St. Patrick's, Pairc Tailteann, 29/8/1965,
- St. Vincent's -vs- Drumree, Skryne, 29/8/1965,
- Ballinlough - Bye,

Round 4:

- Skryne 4-7, 2-2 Drumree, Trim, 12/9/1965,
- St. Patrick's 2-9, 1-4 Ballinlough, Pairc Tailteann, 12/9/1965,
- St. Vincent's - Bye,

Round 5:

- St. Patrick's -vs- Drumree,
- Ballinlough -vs- St. Vincent's,
- Skryne - Bye,

== Final ==
The winners and runners up of each group qualify for the final.

- Kilbride 1-4, 1-3 Skryne, Pairc Tailteann, 24/10/1965,

The S.F.C. final was abandoned by referee Mr. Séamus Duff (Syddan) after 48 minutes due to Martin Quinn's (Kilbride full-back) refusal to vacate the field of play when ordered to by the referee. The referee defended the reasoning for his actions, stating that Quinn had given him a shoulder after a 14-yard free-kick was awarded to Skryne. In the aftermath, members of the Kilbride squad immediately rushed to the sideline where the cup was placed and held it inside their own dressing room. At a County Board meeting in the Navan C.Y.M.S. Hall on Monday 8 November 1965, the title was awarded to Skryne after the reading of the referee's report. At a further meeting (Monday 20 December 1965) Quinn was suspended for 12 months for his actions even though he had refused to admit to them and refused to apologise to the referee at the meeting.
