= Drumbaragh Emmets GFC =

Gaelic football club in County Meath, Ireland

Drumbaragh Emmets
- Emmet Druim Bhearradh
- Founded: 1939
- County: Meath
- Colours
- Grounds: Páirc Emmet

Playing kits
Standard colours

Senior Club Championships
	All Ireland	Leinster champions	Meath champions
Football:	0	0	0

Drumbaragh Emmets GFC is a Gaelic Athletic Association club in Drumbaragh, County Meath, Ireland. The club is affiliated to the Meath County Board and fields teams primarily in Gaelic football.

== History ==
Located in Drumbaragh, approximately 6km from Kells, Drumbaragh Emmets GFC was founded in 1939. Drumbaragh first contested a Meath JFC final against Summerhill in 1953, but after a replay were beaten. Drumbaragh played in a Meath SFC final against Navan O'Mahonys in 1960, but were beaten by the four-in-a-row champions. After amalgamating with Kilmainham and Kells Harps to form Gaeil Colmcille in 1964, Drumbaragh reformed in 1973. Drumbaragh played Summerhill again in a Meath JFC final in 1975, and also lost as before. Drumbaragh finally felt championship success in 1999 against Walterstown 'B' in the Meath JBFC. Drumbaragh went on to win the Meath JFC in 2013, beating Kilmainham in the final. As of 2026 Drumbaragh Emmets compete in the Meath JFC.

== Honours ==
- Meath Senior Football Championship (0): (runners-up in 1960)
- Meath Junior 'A' Football Championship (1): 2013 (runners-up in 1953, 1975)
- Meath Junior 'B' Football Championship (1): 1999

Preceded by Ratoath	Meath Junior Football Champions; 2013	Succeeded by Cortown
