= 1957 Meath Intermediate Football Championship =

Meath I.F.C.
- Season: 1957
- Champions: Carnaross; 1st Intermediate Football Championship title
- Relegated: Drumbaragh; Navan O'Mahonys 'B'; Nobber; Salesian College Warrenstown; Shale Rovers; Syddan 'B'; Trim

The 1957 Meath Intermediate Football Championship is the 31st edition of the Meath GAA's premier club Gaelic football tournament for intermediate graded teams in County Meath, Ireland. The tournament consists of 16 teams. The championship format consists of a group stage before progressing to a knock-out stage.

This was the first year that the Junior 'B' (or Division II) Championship was implemented.

Carnaross and Duleek were regraded from the 1956 S.F.C. and coincidentally both teams made this season's I.F.C. final.

At the end of the season Drumbaragh, Navan O'Mahonys 'B', Nobber, Salesian College, Shale Rovers, Syddan 'B' and Trim 'B' all applied to be regraded to the 1958 J.A.F.C.

On 15 September 1957, Carnaross claimed their 1st Intermediate championship title in front of roughly 500 paid entrants when they defeated Duleek 1-20 to 0-5 in the final at Pairc Tailteann, and thus made the straight bounce back to senior level.

== Team changes ==
The following teams have changed division since the 1956 championship season.

=== From I.F.C. ===
Promoted to 1957 S.F.C.

- None

Relegated to 1957 J.A.F.C.

- Ballinabrackey
- Clonard
- Curraha
- Kilcloon

No Team Entered

- Dunshaughlin

=== To I.F.C. ===
Regraded from 1956 S.F.C.

- Carnaross
- Duleek

Promoted from 1956 J.F.C.

- Oldcastle - (Junior Champions)
- Nobber - (Junior Runners-Up)
- Trim 'B' - (Junior Semi-Finalists)
- Ratoath - (Junior Semi-Finalists)

== Group stage ==
There are 2 groups called Group A and B. The top finisher in each group will qualify for the Final. Many results were unavailable in the Meath Chronicle.

=== Group A ===
Team	Pld	W	L	D	PF	PA	PD	Pts
Duleek	6	6	0	0	0	0	+0	12
Summerhill	6	4	2	0	0	0	+0	8
Salesian College Warrenstown	4	3	1	0	0	0	+0	6
Slane	4	2	2	0	0	0	+0	4
Ratoath	4	2	2	0	0	0	+0	4
Trim 'B'	5	0	5	0	0	0	+0	0
Navan O'Mahonys 'B'	5	0	5	0	0	0	+0	0

Round 1:

- Duleek 2-7, 2-4 Slane, Pairc Tailteann, 10/3/1957,
- Summerhill w, l Ratoath, Drumree, 10/3/1957,
- Warrenstown w, l Trim 'B',
- Navan O'Mahonys 'B' - Bye,

Round 2:

- Slane 4-6, 4-0 Navan O'Mahonys 'B', Skryne, 2/6/1957,
- Duleek 0-9, 1-4 Ratoath, Skryne, 30/6/1957,
- Warrenstown w, l Summerhill, Trim, 30/6/1957,
- Trim 'B' - Bye,

Round 3:

- Slane w/o, scr Trim 'B', Skryne, 30/6/1957,
- Duleek w, l Summerhill, Pairc Tailteann, 25/8/1957,
- Ratoath w/o, scr Navan O'Mahonys 'B',
- Warrenstown - Bye,

Round 4:

- Duleek w/o, scr Navan O'Mahonys 'B', Skryne, 23/6/1957,
- Warrenstown -vs- Slane,
- Ratoath w/o, scr Trim 'B',
- Summerhill - Bye,

Round 5:

- Duleek w/o, scr Trim'B',
- Warrenstown -vs- Ratoath, Skryne, 2/6/1957,
- Summerhill w/o, scr Navan O'Mahonys 'B',
- Slane - Bye,

Round 6:

- Summerhill w, l Slane, Kilmessan, 7/7/1957,
- Duleek 3-3, 1-7 Warrenstown, Pairc Tailteann, 7/7/1957,
- Navan O'Mahonys 'B' -vs- Trim 'B',
- Ratoath - Bye,

Round 7:

- Slane -vs- Ratoath,
- Summerhill w/o, scr Trim 'B',
- Warrenstown w/o, scr Navan O'Mahonys 'B',
- Duleek - Bye,

=== Group B ===
Team	Pld	W	L	D	PF	PA	PD	Pts
Carnaross	7	6	0	1	0	0	+0	13
Oldcastle	7	5	0	2	0	0	+0	12
Fordstown	6	4	1	1	0	0	+0	9
Shale Rovers	6	3	3	0	0	0	+0	6
Drumbaragh	4	2	2	0	0	0	+0	4
Nobber	7	2	5	0	0	0	+0	4
Kilberry	6	1	5	0	0	0	+0	2
Syddan 'B'	7	0	7	0	0	0	+0	0

Round 1:

- Carnaross 3-6, 0-4 Drumbaragh, Kells, 10/3/1957,
- Oldcastle 5-5, 2-3 Shale Rovers, Kells, 17/3/1957,
- Fordstown 1-5, 0-2 Kilberry, Pairc Tailteann, 31/3/1957,
- Nobber 0-12, 0-4 Syddan 'B', Kells, 19/5/1957,

Round 2:

- Shale Rovers w, l Nobber, Kilmainhamwood, 10/3/1957,
- Oldcastle 1-5, 0-8 Fordstown, Kilskyre, 12/5/1957,
- Carnaross w, l Syddan 'B', Castletown, 2/6/1957,
- Drumbaragh -vs- Kilberry, Kells, 14/7/1957,

Round 3:

- Carnaross 2-8, 0-1 Shale Rovers, Kells, 1/8/1957,
- Drumbaragh 1-10, 2-6 Nobber, Kells, 2/6/1957,
- Oldcastle 4-3, 0-2 Kilberry, Kells, 2/6/1957,
- Fordstown w/o, scr Syddan 'B',

Round 4:

- Fordstown w, l Shale Rovers, Castletown, 2/6/1957,
- Nobber w, l Kilberry, Castletown, Athboy, 30/6/1957,
- Carnaross 1-5, 1-5 Oldcastle, Kells, 28/7/1957,
- Drumbaragh w, l Syddan 'B', Gibbstown, 23/6/1957,

Round 5:

- Shale Rovers 1-5, 0-2 Kilberry, Pairc Tailteann, 12/5/1957,
- Carnaross 5-9, 0-6 Nobber, Kells, 21/7/1957,
- Fordstown -vs- Drumbaragh,
- Oldcastle w/o, scr Syddan 'B',

Round 6:

- Carnaross 0-8, 1-3 Fordstown, Kells, 30/6/1957,
- Kilberry w/o, scr Syddan 'B',
- Oldcastle w/o, scr Nobber, *
- Shale Rovers -vs- Drumbaragh,

Round 7:

- Oldcastle 4-3, 0-4 Drumbaragh, Athboy, 30/6/1957,
- Carnaross w/o, scr Kilberry,
- Fordstown w/o, scr Nobber,
- Shale Rovers w/o, scr Syddan,

Final Play-Off:

- Carnaross 1-6, 0-8 Oldcastle, Pairc Tailteann, 8/9/1957, *

- In late July Nobber informed the County Board of their decision to withdraw from the I.F.C. due to a number of players leaving the parish on other commitments.
- It's presumed that due to the number of walk-overs given and the fact that both Carnaross and Oldcastle drew in their group match, that a play-off was conducted to determine who proceeded to the final even though Carnaross finished with an extra point than Oldcastle.

== Final ==
- Carnaross 1-20, 0-5 Duleek, Pairc Tailteann, 15/9/1957.
