= 1949 Meath Senior Football Championship =

Meath S.F.C.
- Season: 1949
- Champions: Syddan; 1st Senior Championship Title
- Relegated: Ardcath; Drumconrath Brian Boru's; Dunderry

The 1949 Meath Senior Football Championship is the 57th edition of the Meath GAA's premier club Gaelic football tournament for senior graded teams in County Meath, Ireland. The tournament consists of 9 teams. The championship applied a league format.

The championship had one divisional side known as North Meath, composed of top players from Intermediate and Junior club players in the district.

- North Meath - (J.F.C. Clubs - Drumconrath [not to be confused with Drumconrath Brian Boru's], Kilmainhamwood, Nobber, Rathbran & Rathkenny).

This season saw Ballivor's return to the top flight after claiming the 1948 Meath Intermediate Football Championship title. Ardcath also made their debut in the grade after claiming the 1948 J.F.C. title.

Skryne were the defending champions after they defeated Syddan in the previous year's final.

Syddan claimed their 1st S.F.C. title after finishing top of the table. Their triumph was sealed by the defeat of North Meath on 6 November 1949 by 5–4 to 1–3 in Pairc Tailteann.

At the end of the season Ardcath and Dunderry were regraded to the 1950 I.F.C. while Drumconrath Brian Boru's were regraded to the 1950 J.F.C.

== Team changes ==
The following teams have changed division since the 1948 championship season.

=== To S.F.C. ===
Promoted from 1948 I.F.C.

- Ballivor - (Intermediate Champions).

Promoted from 1948 J.F.C.

- Ardcath - (Junior Champions).
- St. Mary's Kilbeg - (J.F.C. Semi-Finalists & North District Champions).

=== From S.F.C. ===
Regraded to 1949 I.F.C.

- Duleek

Regraded to 1949 J.F.C.

- Navan Parnells - (folded - formed new Navan O'Mahonys club).
- Castletown/Nobber St. Patrick's - (Nobber entered a team into the 1949 J.F.C. North Division; Castletown next entered a team in the 1951 J.F.C. North Division).

Folded

- Carlanstown Gaels

== League Table & Fixtures/Results ==
The two clubs with the best record enter the S.F.C. Final. Many results were unavailable in the Meath Chronicle.

Team	Pld	W	L	D	PF	PA	PD	Pts
Syddan	5	4	0	1	0	0	+0	9
North Meath	5	4	1	0	0	0	+0	8
Ballivor	4	1	2	1	0	0	+0	3
Ardcath	3	1	1	1	0	0	+0	3
Skryne	2	1	1	0	0	0	+0	2
St. Mary's Kilbeg	2	1	1	0	0	0	+0	2
Dunderry	3	1	2	0	0	0	+0	2
Drumconrath Brian Boru's	3	0	2	1	0	0	+0	1
Oldcastle	3	0	3	0	0	0	+0	0

Round 1:

- Syddan w, l Skryne, Seneschalstown, 6/3/1949,
- North Meath 3-13, 2-5 Dunderry, Kells, 6/3/1949,
- Ardcath w, l Drumconrath, Rathkenny, 6/3/1949,
- Ballivor +3, -3 Kilbeg, Kells, 6/3/1949,
- Oldcastle - Bye,

Round 2:

- Kilbeg 3-2, 2-3 Oldcastle, Kells, 20/3/1949,
- North Meath w, l Drumconrath, Newtown, 22/5/1949,
- Skryne 7-6, 2-3 Ballivor, Trim, 28/8/1949,
- Syddan -vs- Ardcath,
- Dunderry - Bye,

Round 3:

- Syddan 2-12, 2-1 Oldcastle, Kells, 29/5/1949,
- North Meath 2-2, 1-1 Ballivor, Kells, 4/9/1949,
- Skryne -vs- Kilbeg,
- Dunderry -vs- Drumconrath,
- Ardcath - Bye,

Round 4:

- Ballivor 0–11, 0-11 Ardcath, Pairc Tailteann, 5/6/1949,
- Syddan 2–3, 2-3 Drumconrath, Cross Guns, 17/7/1949,
- Kilbeg -vs- Dunderry,
- Skryne -vs- Oldcastle,
- North Meath - Bye,

Round 5:

- North Meath -vs- Kilbeg, Cross Guns, 5/6/1949,
- Syddan -vs- Ballivor,
- Ardcath -vs- Dunderry,
- Oldcastle -vs- Drumconrath,
- Skryne - Bye,

Round 6:

- Dunderry w/o, scr Oldcastle, Kells, 5/6/1949,
- North Meath 2-7, 2-6 Ardcath, Pairc Tailteann, 28/8/1949,
- Syddan -vs- Kilbeg,
- Skryne -vs- Drumconrath,
- Ballivor - Bye,

Round 7:

- Syddan 3-9, 1-3 Dunderry, Pairc Tailteann, 4/9/1949,
- North Meath -vs- Skryne,
- Oldcastle -vs- Ballivor,
- Ardcath -vs- Kilbeg,
- Drumconrath - Bye,

Round 8:

- Kilbeg -vs- Drumconrath,
- Skryne -vs- Ardcath,
- Ballivor -vs- Dunderry,
- North Meath -vs- Oldcastle,
- Syddan - Bye,

Round 9:

- Syddan 5-4, 1-3 North Meath, Pairc Tailteann, 6/11/1949,
- Skryne -vs- Dunderry,
- Ardcath -vs- Oldcastle,
- Ballivor -vs- Drumconrath,
- Kilbeg - Bye,
