= 1967 Meath Senior Football Championship =

Meath S.F.C.
- Season: 1967
- Champions: Kilbride; 2nd Senior Championship Title
- Relegated: None
- Winning Captain: PJ Reilly (Kilbride)
- Matches: 40

The 1967 Meath Senior Football Championship is the 75th edition of the Meath GAA's premier club Gaelic football tournament for senior graded teams in County Meath, Ireland. The tournament consists of 11 teams. The championship starts with a group stage and then a subsequent final.

This season saw Duleek's debut in the top flight after claiming the 1966 Meath Intermediate Football Championship title.

Gaeil Colmcille were the defending champions after they defeated Kilbride in the previous years final after a second replay, however this year they failed to make it past the group phase.

Kilbride claimed their 2nd S.F.C. title on 12 November 1967 when defeating Navan O'Mahonys in the final 0–6 to 0–4 at Pairc Tailteann. PJ Reilly raised the Keegan Cup for the Dunboyne parish outfit.

== Team changes ==
The following teams have changed division since the 1966 championship season.

=== To S.F.C. ===
Promoted from I.F.C.

- Duleek - (Intermediate Champions).

=== From S.F.C. ===
Regraded to I.F.C.

- Drumree

== Group stage ==
=== Group A ===
Team	Pld	W	L	D	PF	PA	PD	Pts
Kilbride	4	4	0	0	0	0	+0	8
Gaeil Colmcille	4	3	1	0	0	0	+0	6
Duleek	4	2	2	0	0	0	+0	4
Ballinlough	4	1	3	0	0	0	+0	2
St. Patrick's	4	0	4	0	0	0	+0	0

Round 1:

- Kilbride 2-4, 1-6 Ballinlough, Kilmessan, 7/5/1967,
- Gaeil Colmcille 0-6, 0-5 Duleek, Kilmessan, 7/5/1967,
- St. Patrick's - Bye,

Round 2:

- Gaeil Colmcille 2-10, 0-6 Ballinlough, Pairc Tailteann, 18/6/1967,
- Kilbride w, l St. Patrick's, Skryne, 18/6/1967,
- Duleek - Bye,

Round 3:

- Duleek 3-6, 3-4 Ballinlough, Pairc Tailteann, 1/7/1967,
- Gaeil Colmcille 0-16, 0-4 St. Patrick's, Pairc Tailteann, 1/7/1967,
- Kilbride - Bye,

Round 4:

- Kilbride w/o, scr Duleek,
- Ballinlough w/o, scr St. Patrick's,
- Gaeil Colmcille - Bye,

Round 5:

- Kilbride 1-5, 0-5 Gaeil Colmcille, Pairc Tailteann,
- Duleek w/o, scr St. Patrick's,
- Ballinlough - Bye,

=== Group B ===
Team	Pld	W	L	D	PF	PA	PD	Pts
Navan O'Mahonys	5	4	0	1	0	0	+0	7
Walterstown	5	4	0	1	0	0	+0	7
Skryne	5	3	2	0	0	0	+0	6
Trim	5	2	3	0	0	0	+0	4
St. Vincent's	5	1	4	0	0	0	+0	2
Kilmainhamwood	5	0	5	0	0	0	+0	0

Round 1:

- St. Vincent's 2-6, 0-3 Kilmainhamwood, Pairc Tailteann, 30/4/1967,
- Navan O'Mahonys 1-5, 0-6 Skryne, Kells, 7/5/1967,
- Walterstown 2-11, 0-5 Trim, Kilmessan, 4/6/1967,

Round 2:

- Walterstown 4-6, 1-4 Skryne, Pairc Tailteann, 18/6/1967,
- Trim 1-9, 0-11 Kilmainhamwood, Kells, 18/6/1967,
- Navan O'Mahonys 1-10, 2-6 St. Vincent's, Kilmessan, 4/6/1967,

Round 3:

- Trim 0-9, 0-3 St. Vincent's, Skryne, 1/7/1967,
- Navan O'Mahonys 2–8, 2-8 Walterstown, Kells, 26/8/1967,
- Skryne w/o, scr Kilmainhamwood,

Round 4:

- Skryne 0-15, 0-7 St. Vincent's, Pairc Tailteann, 30/7/1967,
- Navan O'Mahonys 3-11, 1-5 Trim, Kells, 8/10/1967,
- Walterstown w/o, scr Kilmainhamwood,

Round 5:

- Walterstown w/o, scr St. Vincent's,
- Navan O'Mahonys w/o, scr Kilmainhamwood,
- Skryne w/o, scr Trim,

Final Playoff:

- Navan O'Mahonys w, l Walterstown,

== Final ==
The winners and runners up of each group qualify for the final.

- Kilbride 0-6, 0-4 Navan O'Mahonys, Pairc Tailteann, 12/11/1967,
