= 1960 Meath Intermediate Football Championship =

Gaelic football competition

Meath I.F.C.
- Season: 1960
- Champions: Athboy; 1st Intermediate Football Championship title
- Relegated: Carlanstown, Castletown, Millbrook (to 1961 J.A.F.C.); Fordstown, Kilberry (to 1961 J.B.F.C.)

The 1960 Meath Intermediate Football Championship is the 34th edition of the Meath GAA's premier club Gaelic football tournament for intermediate graded teams in County Meath, Ireland. The tournament consists of 12 teams. The championship format consists of a league stage.

No team was regraded from the 1959 S.F.C.

At the end of the season Carlanstown, Castletown and Millbrook applied to be regraded to the 1961 J.A.F.C. while Fordstown and Kilberry applied to be regraded to the 1961 J.B.F.C.

On 16 October 1960, Athboy claimed their 1st Intermediate championship title when they defeated St. Patrick's 2-7 to 1-3 in the final at Pairc Tailteann.

== Team changes ==
The following teams have changed division since the 1959 championship season.

=== From I.F.C. ===
Promoted to 1960 S.F.C.

- Donaghmore - (Intermediate Champions)

Relegated to 1960 J.A.F.C.

- Clonard
- Curraha
- Duleek

Disbanded:

- Oldcastle - (Didn't enter another team into Meath GAA competitions until the 1964 J.A.F.C.)

=== To I.F.C. ===
Regraded from 1959 S.F.C.

- None

Promoted from 1959 J.A.F.C. & J.B.F.C.

- Drumree - (Junior & Junior 'A' Divisional Champions)
- St. Patrick's - (Junior 'A' Divisional Runners-Up)
- Millbrook - (Junior 'A' Semi-Finalists)
- Kilberry - (Junior 'A' Semi-Finalists)

== Group stage ==
There are 2 groups called Group A and B. The top finisher in each group will qualify for the Final. Some results were unavailable in the Meath Chronicle.

=== Group A ===
Team	Pld	W	L	D	PF	PA	PD	Pts
St. Patrick's	3	3	0	0	0	0	+0	6
Slane	3	2	1	0	0	0	+0	4
Dunshaughlin	4	2	2	0	0	0	+0	4
Kilmainhamwood	2	1	1	0	0	0	+0	2
Kilberry	5	1	4	0	0	0	+0	2
Castletown	3	1	2	0	0	0	+0	2

Round 1:

- Slane 3-4, 0-4 Kilberry, Pairc Tailteann, 6/3/1960,
- Castletown 2-3, 0-3 Kilmainhamwood, Kells, 13/3/1960,
- St. Patrick's w, l Dunshaughlin, Ashbourne, 13/3/1960,

Round 2:

- Kilmainhamwood 3-9, 3-5 Kilberry, Kells, 22/5/1960,
- Dunshaughlin 3-11, 2-5 Castletown, Skryne, 29/5/1960,
- St. Patrick's 3-8, 0-6 Slane, Pairc Tailteann, 18/9/1960,

Round 3:

- St. Patrick's -vs- Castletown, Lougher, 5/6/1960,
- Kilmainhamwood -vs- Slane, Castletown, 26/6/1960,
- Dunshaughlin w, l Kilberry, Kilmessan, 24/7/1960,

Round 4:

- St. Patrick's -vs- Kilmainhamwood, Pairc Tailteann, 17/7/1960,
- Kilberry 1-6, 2-1 Castletown, Kells, 31/7/1960,
- Slane 1-8, 0-7 Dunshaughlin, Skryne, 21/8/1960,

Round 5:

- St. Patrick's w, l Kilberry, Skryne, 21/8/1960,
- Kilmainhamwood -vs- Dunshaughlin,
- Slane -vs- Castletown,

=== Group B ===
Team	Pld	W	L	D	PF	PA	PD	Pts
Athboy	5	4	0	1	0	0	+0	9
Drumree	5	4	1	0	0	0	+0	8
Ballinabrackey	5	3	1	1	0	0	+0	7
Millbrook	5	2	3	0	0	0	+0	4
Fordstown	5	1	4	0	0	0	+0	2
Carlanstown	5	0	5	0	0	0	+0	0

Round 1:

- Athboy 3-6, 1-3 Fordstown, Pairc Tailteann, 6/3/1960,
- Millbrook 1-6, 0-4 Carlanstown, Kells, 13/3/1960,
- Drumree w, l Ballinabrackey, Trim, 13/3/1960,

Round 2:

- Millbrook 0-9, 0-5 Fordstown, Kells, 3/4/1960,
- Drumree w, l Carlanstown, Dunderry, 26/6/1960,
- Ballinabrackey 1-5, 1-5 Athboy, Kildalkey, 3/7/1960,

Round 3:

- Fordstown 2-1, 0-4 Carlanstown, Kells, 17/7/1960,
- Athboy 1-5, 0-7 Drumree, Kilmessan, 24/7/1960,
- Ballinabrackey w, l Millbrook, Kildalkey, 24/7/1960,

Round 4:

- Drumree 1-10, 2-5 Millbrook, Pairc Tailteann, 28/8/1960,
- Ballinabrackey w, l Fordstown,
- Athboy w/o, scr Carlanstown,

Round 5:

- Athboy 1-8, 1-4 Millbrook, Kells, 18/9/1960,
- Ballinabrackey w/o, scr Carlanstown,
- Drumree w/o, scr Fordstown,

== Final ==
- Athboy 2-7, 1-3 St. Patrick's, Pairc Tailteann, 16/10/1960.
