= Matt Gilsenan =

Irish Gaelic footballer

Personal information
- Native name: Maitiú Mac Giolla Seanáin (Irish)
- Born: 28 October 1915 Moynalty, County Meath, Ireland
- Died: 6 April 2013 (aged 97) Navan, County Meath, Ireland
- Occupation: Farmer

Sport
- Sport: Gaelic football
- Position: Left wing-forward
Club
- Years: Club
- St Mary's
Club titles
- Meath titles: 1
Inter-county
- Years: County
- 1935-1946: Meath
Inter-county titles
- Leinster titles: 2
- All-Irelands: 0
- NFL: 0

Matthew Gilsenan (28 October 1915 – 6 April 2013) was an Irish Gaelic footballer and selector who played as a left wing-forward at senior level for the Meath county team.

Gilsenan made his first appearance for the team during the 1935 championship and was a regular member of the starting fifteen until his retirement after the 1946 championship. During that time he won two Leinster medals. Gilsenan was an All-Ireland runner-up on one occasion.

At club level Gilsenan was a county football championship medalist with moynalty GFC.

In retirement from playing Gilsenan became involved in coaching and team management. He served as a selector at various times between 1939 and 1970, a period which saw Meath win three All-Ireland titles and eleven Leinster titles.

Sporting positions
Preceded by	Meath Senior Football Captain; 1939–1940	Succeeded by
