= 1962 Meath Intermediate Football Championship =

Meath I.F.C.
- Season: 1962
- Champions: Kilbride; 1st Intermediate Football Championship title
- Relegated: Commons; Dunshaughlin; Newtown Blues; Rathmolyon; Ratoath; St. Mary's Bettystown

The 1962 Meath Intermediate Football Championship is the 36th edition of the Meath GAA's premier club Gaelic football tournament for intermediate graded teams in County Meath, Ireland. The tournament consists of 13 teams. The championship starts with a group stage and then progresses to a knock out stage.

Kells Harps and St. Mary's Bettystown were regraded from the 1961 S.F.C.

At the end of the season, 6 clubs (Commons, Dunshaughlin, Newtown Blues, Rathmolyon, Ratoath, St. Mary's Bettystown) applied to be regraded to the 1963 J.F.C, all of which (except for Dunshaughlin) spending just one season in the middle grade.

On 16 September 1962, Kilbride claimed their 1st Intermediate championship title when they defeated Walterstown 3–8 to 1–3 in the final at Pairc Tailteann.

== Team changes ==
The following teams have changed division since the 1961 championship season.

=== From I.F.C. ===
Promoted to 1962 S.F.C.

- Drumree - (Intermediate Champions)

Relegated to 1962 J.A.F.C.

- Ballinabrackey
- Clonard
- Navan O'Mahonys 'B'

=== To I.F.C. ===
Regraded from 1961 S.F.C.

- Kells Harps
- St. Mary's Bettystown

Promoted from 1961 J.A.F.C. & J.B.F.C.

- Walterstown - (Junior & Junior 'B' Divisional Champions)
- Ratoath - (Junior 'A' Divisional Champions)
- Rathmolyon - (Junior 'A' Divisional Runners-Up)
- Commons - (Junior 'A' West Divisional Champions & Junior 'A' Semi-Finalists)
- Newtown Blues - (Junior 'A' North Divisional Champions & Junior 'A' Semi-Finalists)
- Salesian College Warrenstown

== Group stage ==
There are 2 groups called Group A and B. The top finisher in each group will qualify for the Final. Some results were unavailable in the Meath Chronicle.

=== Group A ===
Team	Pld	W	L	D	PF	PA	PD	Pts
Walterstown	5	5	0	0	0	0	+0	10
Kells Harps	5	4	1	0	0	0	+0	8
Newtown Blues	4	2	2	0	0	0	+0	4
St. Mary's Bettystown	4	2	2	0	0	0	+0	4
Slane	5	1	4	0	0	0	+0	2
Salesian College Warrenstown	5	1	4	0	0	0	+0	2

Round 1:

- Newtown Blues 2–9, 0–3 Kells Harps, Pairc Tailteann, 18/3/1962,
- Walterstown 2–8, 1–8 Warrenstown, Skryne, 18/3/1962,
- Bettystown +5, –5 Slane, Lougher, 15/4/1962,

Round 2:

- Kells Harps w, l Bettystown, Pairc Tailteann, 22/4/1962,
- Walterstown 2–7, 0–8 Slane, Pairc Tailteann, 22/4/1962,
- Warrenstown w, l Newtown Blues,

Round 3:

- Kells Harps 0–7, 0–4 Slane, Castletown, 13/5/1962,
- Walterstown 5–10, 0–3 Newtown Blues, Pairc Tailteann, 8/7/1962,
- Bettystown w, l Warrenstown,

Round 4:

- Walterstown 2–7, 0–3 Bettystown, Lougher, 18/8/1962,
- Kells Harps w/o, scr Warrenstown,
- Newtown Blues w, l Slane,

Round 5:

- Walterstown 1–7, 1–4 Kells Harps, Pairc Tailteann, 18/8/1962,
- Slane w/o, scr Warrenstown,
- Bettystown -vs- Newtown Blues,

=== Group B ===
Team	Pld	W	L	D	PF	PA	PD	Pts
Kilbride	6	5	0	1	0	0	+0	11
St. Patrick's	6	4	0	2	0	0	+0	10
Kilmainhamwood	5	3	1	1	0	0	+0	7
Dunshaughlin	4	2	2	0	0	0	+0	4
Ratoath	5	2	3	0	0	0	+0	4
Rathmolyon	6	1	5	0	0	0	+0	2
Commons	6	0	6	0	0	0	+0	0

Round 1:

- Kilmainhamwood 2–7, 0–2 Commons, Kells, 18/3/1962,
- St. Patrick's w, l Rathmolyon, Dunshaughlin, 18/3/1962,
- Kilbride 2–12, 1–2 Ratoath, Skryne, 24/6/1962,
- Dunshaughlin - Bye,

Round 2:

- Kilmainhamwood w, l Rathmolyon, Kildalkey, 15/4/1962,
- St. Patrick's w/o, scr Commons, Skryne, 15/4/1962
- Kilbride w, l Dunshaughlin, Ashbourne, 8/7/1962,
- Ratoath - Bye,

Round 3:

- Kilmainhamwood 0–5, 1–2 St. Patrick's, Pairc Tailteann, 20/5/1962,
- Ratoath -vs- Dunshaughlin, Skryne, 22/7/1962,
- Rathmolyon w/o, scr Commons,
- Kilbride - Bye,

Round 4:

- St. Patrick's w, l Dunshaughlin, Kilmessan, 12/8/1962,
- Ratoath w/o, scr Commons,
- Kilbride w/o, scr Rathmolyon,
- Kilmainhamwood - Bye,

Round 5:

- Kilbride 2–6, 1–6 Kilmainhamwood, Pairc Tailteann, 12/8/1962,
- St. Patrick's w/o, scr Ratoath, Skryne, 18/8/1962,
- Dunshaughlin w/o, scr Rathmolyon,
- Commons - Bye,

Round 6:

- Kilbride w/o, scr Commons,
- Ratoath w/o, scr Rathmolyon,
- Kilmainhamwood -vs- Dunshaughlin,
- St. Patrick's - Bye,

Round 7:

- Kilbride 0–10, 1–7 St. Patrick's, Skryne, 2/9/1962,
- Kilmainhamwood w/o, scr Ratoath,
- Dunshaughlin w/o, scr Commons,
- Rathmolyon - Bye,

== Final ==
- Kilbride 3–8, 1–3 Walterstown, Pairc Tailteann, 16/9/1962,
