= 1961 Meath Senior Football Championship =

Meath S.F.C.
- Season: 1961
- Champions: Navan O'Mahonys; 6th Senior Championship Title
- Relegated: Kells Harps; St. Mary's Bettystown
- Winning Captain: Jim Fitzsimons (Navan O'Mahonys)
- Matches: 14

The 1961 Meath Senior Football Championship is the 69th edition of the Meath GAA's premier club Gaelic football tournament for senior graded teams in County Meath, Ireland. The tournament consists of 13 teams. The championship employed a straight knock-out format.

This season saw Athboy's debut in the top flight after claiming the 1960 Meath Intermediate Football Championship title.

Navan O'Mahonys were the defending champions after they defeated Drumbaragh in the previous years final, and they successfully defended their crown to claim their 6th S.F.C. title (5-in-a-row) by defeating Trim in the final at Pairc Tailteann by 1-8 to 0-8 on 17 September 1961. Jim Fitzsimons raised the Keegan Cup for the Hoops.

At the end of the season Kells Harps and St. Mary's Bettystown were regraded to the 1962 I.F.C. after 10 and 3 years respectively as senior clubs.

== Team changes ==
The following teams have changed division since the 1960 championship season.

=== To S.F.C. ===
Promoted from 1960 I.F.C.

- Athboy - (Intermediate Champions).

=== From S.F.C. ===
Regraded to 1961 I.F.C.

- None

Regraded to 1961 J.A.F.C.

- Carnaross

== First round ==
12 teams enter this round selected by random draw. The winner progresses to the quarter-finals.

- Syddan 1-7, 2-4 Kells Harps, Pairc Tailteann, 23/4/1961,
- St. Vincent's 4-7, 2-6 Ballinlough, Pairc Tailteann, 23/4/1961,
- Drumbaragh 2-9, 0-10 St. Peter's Dunboyne, Pairc Tailteann, 30/4/1961,
- Navan O'Mahonys 5-13, 0-1 St. Mary's Bettystown, Skryne, 30/4/1961,
- Athboy 5-6, 1-6 Donaghmore, Trim, 30/4/1961,
- Trim 2-8, 3-3 Ballivor, Kildalkey, 25/6/1961,
- Skryne - Bye,
- Syddan 1-13, 1-6 Kells Harps, Pairc Tailteann, 28/5/1961, (Replay)

== Quarter-finals ==
The remaining club (Skryne) along with the Round 1 winners enter this round. Athboy received a bye to the semi-finals by random draw.

- Skryne 2-11, 2-2 St. Vincent's, Pairc Tailteann, 25/6/1961,
- Navan O'Mahonys 1-6, 2-3 Drumbaragh, Pairc Tailteann, 16/7/1961,
- Trim 3-9, 1-5 Syddan, Kells, 23/7/1961,
- Athboy - Bye,
- Navan O'Mahonys 2-4, 2-3 Drumbaragh, Trim, 30/7/1961, (Replay)

== Semi-finals ==
- Navan O'Mahonys 3-6, 1-2 Skryne, Pairc Tailteann, 3/9/1961,
- Trim 1-10, 0-6 Athboy, Pairc Tailteann, 3/9/1961,

== Final ==
- Navan O'Mahonys 1-8, 0-8 Trim, Pairc Tailteann, 17/9/1961,
