= 1956 Meath Senior Football Championship =

Irish county-level tournament in Gaelic football

Meath S.F.C.
- Season: 1956
- Champions: Syddan; 4th Senior Championship Title
- Relegated: Carnaross; Duleek
- Winning Captain: Tommy Farrelly (Syddan)
- Matches: 13

The 1956 Meath Senior Football Championship is the 64th edition of the Meath GAA's premier club Gaelic football tournament for senior graded teams in County Meath, Ireland. The tournament consists of 12 teams. The championship employs a group stage followed by a final between the group winners.

This season saw Duleek's return to the top flight after claiming the 1955 Meath Intermediate Football Championship title. Carnaross also made a return to the grade after claiming the 1955 J.F.C. title.

St. Vincent's were the defending champions after they defeated Kells Harps in the previous years final, however they lost their crown by failing to progress past the group stages.

Syddan claimed their 4th S.F.C. title in front of approximately 4,000 people by defeating Skryne in the final at Pairc Tailteann by 3-4 to 2-6 on 14 October 1956. Tommy Farrelly raised the Keegan Cup for the North Meath side.

At the end of the season the two newly promoted sides (Carnaross and Duleek) were regraded to the 1957 I.F.C.

== Team changes ==
The following teams have changed division since the 1955 championship season.

=== To S.F.C. ===
Promoted from 1955 I.F.C.

- Duleek - (Intermediate Champions).

Promoted from 1955 J.F.C.

- Carnaross - (Junior Champions).

=== From S.F.C. ===
Regraded to 1956 I.F.C.

- Fordstown

=== Group A ===
Team	Pld	W	L	D	PF	PA	PD	Pts
Skryne	5	4	1	0	0	0	+0	8
St. Peter's Dunboyne	5	4	1	0	0	0	+0	8
Donaghmore	3	2	1	0	0	0	+0	4
Trim	2	0	2	0	0	0	+0	0
St. Vincent's	3	0	3	0	0	0	+0	0
Duleek	2	0	2	0	0	0	+0	0

Round 1:

- Skryne 3-4, 1-6 St. Vincent's, Pairc Tailteann, 4/3/1956,
- Trim -vs- Donaghmore, Skryne, 4/3/1956,
- St. Peter's Dunboyne w, l Duleek, Skryne, 4/3/1956,

Round 2:

- Skryne 0-11, 1-6 St. Peter's Dunboyne, Trim, 18/3/1956,
- Donaghmore -vs- Duleek, Skryne, 18/3/1956,
- Trim -vs- St. Vincent's, Skryne, 10/6/1956,

Round 3:

- Skryne 4-6, 2-1 Duleek, Pairc Tailteann, 10/6/1956,
- St. Peter's Dunboyne w, l Trim, Skryne, 17/6/1956,
- Donaghmore w, l St. Vincent's, Skryne, 15/7/1956,

Round 4:

- Trim -vs- Duleek, Skryne, 5/8/1956,
- Donaghmore 1-5, 1-4 Skryne, Pairc Tailteann, 19/8/1956,
- St. Peter's Dunboyne w, l St. Vincent's,

Round 5:

- St. Peter's Dunboyne 5-5, 1-1 Donaghmore, Pairc Tailteann, 2/9/1956,
- Skryne w/o, scr Trim,
- St. Vincent's -vs- Duleek,

Final Play-offs:

- Skryne 1-9, 0-9 St. Peter's Dunboyne, Pairc Tailteann, 9/9/1956,

=== Group B ===
Team	Pld	W	L	D	PF	PA	PD	Pts
Syddan	5	4	1	0	0	0	+0	8
Ballinlough	5	4	1	0	0	0	+0	8
Navan O'Mahonys	5	3	2	0	0	0	+0	6
Kells Harps	5	2	3	0	0	0	+0	4
Carnaross	5	1	4	0	0	0	+0	2
Ballivor	3	0	3	0	0	0	+0	0

Round 1:

- Navan O'Mahonys 6-6, 0-2 Kells Harps, Pairc Tailteann, 4/3/1956,
- Syddan 2-6, 1-5 Ballinlough, Kells, 11/3/1956,
- Carnaross w, l Ballivor, Athboy, 11/3/1956,

Round 2:

- Navan O'Mahonys 3-6, 2-0 Ballivor, Trim, 18/3/1956,
- Ballinlough 0-7, 0-1 Carnaross, Kells, 25/3/1956,
- Kells Harps 0-4, 0-2 Syddan, Pairc Tailteann, 1/7/1956,

Round 3:

- Kells Harps w/o, scr Ballivor, Athboy, 15/7/1956,
- Syddan 1-5, 0-4 Carnaross, Kells, 15/7/1956,
- Ballinlough 4-5, 2-6 Navan O'Mahonys, Kells, 15/7/1956,

Round 4:

- Ballinlough 2-7, 1-9 Kells Harps, Pairc Tailteann, 29/7/1956,
- Navan O'Mahonys w, l Carnaross, Kells, 29/7/1956,
- Syddan w/o, scr Ballivor,

Round 5:

- Syddan 2-5, 0-4 Navan O'Mahonys, Kells, 2/9/1956,
- Kells Harps w, l Carnaross,
- Ballinlough w/o, scr Ballivor,

Final Play-offs:

- Syddan 4-2, 1-8 Ballinlough, Kells, 9/9/1956,

== Final ==
- Syddan 3-4, 2-6 Skryne, Pairc Tailteann, 14/10/1956,
