= 1966 Meath Senior Football Championship =

Meath S.F.C.
- Season: 1966
- Champions: Gaeil Colmcille; 1st Senior Championship Title
- Relegated: Drumree
- Winning Captain: Phil Fay (Gaeil Colmcille)
- Matches: 40

The 1966 Meath Senior Football Championship is the 74th edition of the Meath GAA's premier club Gaelic football tournament for senior graded teams in County Meath, Ireland. The tournament consists of 11 teams. The championship starts with a group stage and then a subsequent final.

This season saw Kilmainhamwood's debut in the top flight after claiming the 1965 Meath Intermediate Football Championship title. The strong St. Vincent's side of the last decade was severely depleted after the formation of the Bellewstown St. Theresa's club saw a number of their players transfer to the new outfit.

Skryne were the defending champions after they were given the points against Kilbride in the previous year's final, however this year they failed to make it to the knock-out stages.

Drumree applied to be regraded to the 1967 I.F.C. after winning just one match in this year's campaign by virtue of a walkover.

Gaeil Colmcille (formed in 1964 from the Drumbaragh and Kells Harps clubs) claimed their 1st S.F.C. title on 27 November 1966 after a second replay when defeating Kilbride in the final by 0-8 to 0-6 at Pairc Tailteann. Phil Fay raised the Keegan Cup for the Kells parish outfit.

== Team changes ==
The following teams have changed division since the 1965 championship season.

=== To S.F.C. ===
Promoted from I.F.C.

- Kilmainhamwood - (Intermediate Champions).

=== From S.F.C. ===
Regraded to I.F.C.

- None

== Group stage ==
=== Group A ===
Team	Pld	W	L	D	PF	PA	PD	Pts
Kilbride	5	5	0	0	0	0	+0	10
Navan O'Mahonys	5	4	1	0	0	0	+0	8
Skryne	5	3	2	0	0	0	+0	6
Trim	5	2	3	0	0	0	+0	4
Ballinlough	5	0	4	1	0	0	+0	1
St. Vincent's	5	0	4	1	0	0	+0	1

Round 1:

- Trim w, l Ballinlough, Athboy, 24/4/1966,
- Navan O'Mahonys 1-9, 0-3 St. Vincent's, Skryne, 1/5/1966,
- Kilbride 5-3, 0-5 Skryne, Pairc Tailteann, 23/5/1966,

Round 2:

- Ballinlough 1-3, 1-3 St. Vincent's, Pairc Tailteann, 22/5/1966,
- Skryne 1-8, 1-6 Trim, Kilmessan, 19/6/1966,
- Kilbride 1-6, 0-8 Navan O'Mahonys, Kilmessan, 3/7/1966,

Round 3:

- Skryne 1-12, 1-3 Ballinlough, Pairc Tailteann, 3/7/1966,
- Kilbride w/o, scr St. Vincent's, Skryne, 31/7/1966,
- Navan O'Mahonys 7-8, 2-2 Trim, Kilmessan, 28/8/1966,

Round 4:

- Kilbride w, l Ballinlough, Pairc Tailteann, 28/8/1966,
- Trim w/o, scr St. Vincent's,
- Navan O'Mahonys w/o, scr Skryne,

Round 5:

- Skryne w/o, scr St. Vincent's,
- Kilbride w/o, scr Trim,
- Navan O'Mahonys w/o, scr Ballinlough,

=== Group B ===
Team	Pld	W	L	D	PF	PA	PD	Pts
Gaeil Colmcille	4	4	0	0	0	0	+0	8
Walterstown	4	3	1	0	0	0	+0	6
Kilmainhamwood	4	2	2	0	0	0	+0	4
Drumree	4	1	3	0	0	0	+0	2
St. Patrick's	5	0	5	0	0	0	+0	0

Round 1:

- Walterstown 0-12, 1-4 St. Patrick's, Pairc Tailteann, 27/3/1966,
- Kilmainhamwood 1-9, 2-5 Drumree, Pairc Tailteann, 24/4/1966,
- Gaeil Colmcille - Bye,

Round 2:

- Gaeil Colmcille 5-10, 1-4 St. Patrick's, Pairc Tailteann, 24/4/1966,
- Walterstown 1-11, 1-3 Kilmainhamwood, Kells, 12/6/1966,
- Drumree - Bye,

Round 3:

- Gaeil Colmcille w, l Kilmainhamwood, Castletown, 19/6/1966,
- Walterstown w, l Drumree, Skryne, 3/7/1966,
- St. Patrick's - Bye,

Round 4:

- Drumree w/o, scr St. Patrick's, Skryne, 31/7/1966,
- Gaeil Colmcille 1-5, 0-7 Walterstown, Pairc Tailteann, 28/8/1966,
- Kilmainhamwood - Bye,

Round 5:

- Gaeil Colmcille w/o, scr Drumree,
- Kilmainhamwood w/o, scr St. Patrick's,
- Walterstown - Bye,

== Final ==
The winners and runners up of each group qualify for the final.

- Gaeil Colmcille 1-7, 1-7 Kilbride, Pairc Tailteann, 9/10/1966,
- Gaeil Colmcille 3-2, 1-8 Kilbride, Pairc Tailteann, 6/11/1966, (AET)
- Gaeil Colmcille 0-8, 0-6 Kilbride, Pairc Tailteann, 27/11/1966.
