= 1961 Meath Intermediate Football Championship =

Meath I.F.C.
- Season: 1961
- Champions: Drumree; 1st Intermediate Football Championship title
- Relegated: Ballinabrackey; Clonard; Navan O'Mahonys 'B'

The 1961 Meath Intermediate Football Championship is the 35th edition of the Meath GAA's premier club Gaelic football tournament for intermediate graded teams in County Meath, Ireland. The tournament consists of 9 teams. The championship format consists of a league stage.

No team was regraded from the 1960 S.F.C.

At the end of the season Ballinabrackey, Clonard and Navan O'Mahonys 'B' applied to be regraded to the 1962 J.F.C.

On 20 August 1961, Drumree claimed their 1st Intermediate championship title when they defeated Slane 2–7 to 1–3 in the final at Pairc Tailteann.

== Team changes ==
The following teams have changed division since the 1960 championship season.

=== From I.F.C. ===
Promoted to 1961 S.F.C.

- Athboy - (Intermediate Champions)

Relegated to 1961 J.A.F.C.

- Carlanstown
- Castletown
- Millbrook

Relegated to 1961 J.B.F.C.

- Fordstown
- Kilberry

=== To I.F.C. ===
Regraded from 1960 S.F.C.

- None

Promoted from 1960 J.A.F.C. & J.B.F.C.

- Kilbride - (Junior & Junior 'A' Divisional Champions)
- Clonard - (Junior 'A' Divisional Runners-Up)
- Navan O'Mahonys 'B' - (Junior 'A' Semi-Finalists)

== Group stage ==
There are 2 groups called Group A and B. The top finisher in each group will qualify for the Final. Some results were unavailable in the Meath Chronicle.

=== Group A ===
Team	Pld	W	L	D	PF	PA	PD	Pts
Drumree	3	3	0	0	0	0	+0	6
Kilbride	1	0	1	0	0	0	+0	0
Ballinabrackey	0	0	0	0	0	0	+0	0
Clonard	0	0	0	0	0	0	+0	0

Round 1:

- Kilbride -vs- Ballinabrackey, Trim, 12/3/1961,
- Drumree -vs- Clonard, Trim, 16/4/1961,

Round 2:

- Drumree 3-1, 1-4 Kilbride, Trim, 30/4/1961,
- Clonard -vs- Ballinabrackey, Enfield, 30/4/1961,

Round 3:

- Drumree -vs- Ballinabrackey, Trim, 28/5/1961,
- Kilbride -vs- Clonard,

=== Group B ===
Team	Pld	W	L	D	PF	PA	PD	Pts
Slane	4	3	1	0	0	0	+0	6
Dunshaughlin	4	2	0	2	0	0	+0	6
Kilmainhamwood	4	2	1	1	0	0	+0	5
St. Patrick's	4	1	2	1	0	0	+0	3
Navan O'Mahonys 'B'	4	0	4	0	0	0	+0	0

Round 1:

- St. Patrick's 1–3, 0-6 Dunshaughlin, Skryne, 12/3/1961,
- Slane 2-8, 0-7 Kilmainhamwood, Pairc Tailteann, 12/3/1961,
- Navan O'Mahonys 'B' - Bye,

Round 2:

- Slane 2-3, 0-7 St. Patrick's, Duleek, 30/4/1961,
- Dunshaughlin 1-11, 0-4 Navan O'Mahonys 'B', Skryne, 30/4/1961,
- Kilmainhamwood - Bye,

Round 3:

- Kilmainhamwood 0-9, 0-4 St. Patrick's, Slane, 14/5/1961,
- Slane 1-4, 0-4 Navan O'Mahonys 'B', Skryne, 28/5/1961,
- Dunshaughlin - Bye,

Round 4:

- St. Patrick's 6-10, 2-2 Navan O'Mahonys 'B', Skryne, 18/6/1961,
- Dunshaughlin 1–7, 2-4 Kilmainhamwood, Pairc Tailteann, 18/6/1961,
- Slane - Bye,

Round 5:

- Dunshaughlin 2-10, 1-4 Slane, Pairc Tailteann, 25/6/1961,
- Kilmainhamwood w/o, scr Navan O'Mahonys 'B',
- St. Patrick's - Bye,

Final Play-off:

- Slane 3-8, 1-6 Dunshaughlin, Pairc Tailteann, 30/7/1961,

== Final ==
- Drumree 2-7, 1-3 Slane, Pairc Tailteann, 20/8/1961,
