= 1959 Meath Senior Football Championship =

Gaelic football tournament

Meath S.F.C.
- Season: 1959
- Champions: Navan O'Mahonys; 4th Senior Championship Title
- Relegated: None
- Winning Captain: Brendan Cahill (Navan O'Mahonys)
- Matches: 13

The 1959 Meath Senior Football Championship is the 67th edition of the Meath GAA's premier club Gaelic football tournament for senior graded teams in County Meath, Ireland. The tournament consists of 13 teams. The 1959 season was the first season that the championship employed a straight knock-out format on a permanent basis after it was tested on a trial basis in 1957. This was maintained until 1964.

This season saw St. Mary's Bettystown's return to the top flight after claiming the 1958 Meath Intermediate Football Championship title, ending their 12 year exodus from the top-flight.

Navan O'Mahonys were the defending champions after they defeated Skryne in the previous years final replay, and they successfully defended their crown to claim their 4th S.F.C. title (3-in-a-row) by defeating Skryne again in the final at Trim by 1-9 to 2-5 on 30 August 1959. Brendan Cahill raised the Keegan Cup for the Hoops.

At the end of the season no club was regraded.

== Team changes ==
The following teams have changed division since the 1958 championship season.

=== To S.F.C. ===
Promoted from 1958 I.F.C.

- St. Mary's Bettystown - (Intermediate Champions).

Promoted from 1958 J.A.F.C.

- Drumbaragh

=== From S.F.C. ===
Regraded to 1959 I.F.C.

- None

== First round ==
8 teams enter this round selected by random draw. The winner progresses to the quarter-finals.

- Kells Harps 1-10, 1-7 St. Mary's Bettystown, Kilmessan, 8/3/1959,
- Ballivor 2-5, 0-7 Ballinlough, Kells, 8/3/1959,
- St. Vincent's 3-2, 2-1 Syddan, Pairc Tailteann, 8/3/1959,
- Skryne w, l Trim,
- Carnaross - Bye,
- Navan O'Mahonys - Bye,
- St. Peter's Dunboyne - Bye,

== Quarter-finals ==
The 3 remaining clubs (Carnaross, Navan O'Mahonys & St. Peter's Dunboyne) along with the Round 1 winners enter this round.

- Carnaross 1-4, 1-4 Kells Harps, Kells, 15/3/1959,
- Navan O'Mahonys 0-7, 0-5 Drumbaragh, Kells, 19/4/1959,
- St. Vincent's 1-9, 1-5 Ballivor, Pairc Tailteann, 17/5/1959,
- Skryne 1-12, 0-7 St. Peter's Dunboyne, Pairc Tailteann, 17/5/1959,
- Carnaross 1-5, 0-5 Kells Harps, Pairc Tailteann, 26/4/1959, (Replay)

== Semi-finals ==
- Navan O'Mahonys 2-10, 0-4 Carnaross, Pairc Tailteann, 17/5/1959,
- Skryne 1-4, 1-3 St. Vincent's, Pairc Tailteann, 12/7/1959,

== Final ==
- Navan O'Mahonys 1-9, 2-5 Skryne, Trim, 30/8/1959,
