= 1958 Meath Senior Football Championship =

Meath S.F.C.
- Season: 1958
- Champions: Navan O'Mahonys; 3rd Senior Championship Title
- Relegated: None
- Winning Captain: Willie McGurk (Navan O'Mahonys)
- Matches: 13

The 1958 Meath Senior Football Championship is the 66th edition of the Meath GAA's premier club Gaelic football tournament for senior graded teams in County Meath, Ireland. The tournament consists of 10 teams. The championship reverted to the group and knock-out format after a straight knock-out basis was trialed in 1957.

This season saw Carnaross return to the top flight after claiming the 1957 Meath Intermediate Football Championship title.

Navan O'Mahonys were the defending champions after they defeated Skryne in the previous years final, and they successfully defended their crown to claim their 3rd S.F.C. title (2-in-a-row) by defeating Skryne again in the final replay at Kells by 2-6 to 1-2 on 7 December 1958. Willie McGurk raised the Keegan Cup for the Hoops.

At the end of the season no club was regraded.

== Team changes ==
The following teams have changed division since the 1957 championship season.

=== To S.F.C. ===
Promoted from 1957 I.F.C.

- Carnaros - (Intermediate Champions).

=== From S.F.C. ===
Regraded to 1958 I.F.C.

- Donaghmore

=== Group A ===
Team	Pld	W	L	D	PF	PA	PD	Pts
Navan O'Mahonys	4	4	0	0	0	0	+0	8
Ballinlough	3	2	1	0	0	0	+0	4
Kells Harps	2	1	1	0	0	0	+0	2
Trim	3	0	3	0	0	0	+0	0
Carnaross	2	0	2	0	0	0	+0	0

Round 1:

- Navan O'Mahonys 2-5, 0-5 Carnaross, Kells, 23/3/1958,
- Kells Harps 1-5, 0-2 Trim, Pairc Tailteann, 23/3/1958,
- Ballinlough - Bye,

Round 2:

- Navan O'Mahonys 2-15, 0-2 Trim, Skryne, 4/5/1958,
- Ballinlough 2-7, 1-4 Carnaross, Kells, 11/5/1958,
- Kells Harps - Bye,

Round 3:

- Navan O'Mahonys 4-13, 2-1 Kells Harps, Skryne, 22/6/1958,
- Ballinlough 1-7, 1-4 Trim, Pairc Tailteann, 22/6/1958,
- Carnaross - Bye,

Round 4:

- Navan O'Mahonys 1-8, 1-6 Ballinlough, Kells, 29/6/1958,
- Kells Harps -vs- Carnaross, Kells, 29/6/1958,
- Trim - Bye,

Round 5:

- Ballinlough -vs- Kells Harps,
- Trim -vs- Carnaross,
- Navan O'Mahonys - Bye,

=== Group B ===
Team	Pld	W	L	D	PF	PA	PD	Pts
Skryne	4	3	1	0	0	0	+0	6
Syddan	4	3	1	0	0	0	+0	6
Ballivor	4	3	1	0	0	0	+0	6
St. Vincent's	3	0	3	0	0	0	+0	0
St. Peter's Dunboyne	3	0	3	0	0	0	+0	0

Round 1:

- Skryne 1-7, 1-5 Syddan, Pairc Tailteann, 23/3/1958,
- Ballivor w, l St. Peter's Dunboyne, Trim, 23/3/1958,
- St. Vincent's - Bye,

Round 2:

- Ballivor 2-4, 1-5 Skryne, Trim, 4/5/1958,
- St. Vincent's -vs- St. Peter's Dunboyne, Skryne, 11/5/1958,
- Syddan - Bye,

Round 3:

- Syddan 1-3, 0-3 Ballivor, Pairc Tailteann, 15/6/1958,
- Skryne 1-4, 1-3 St. Vincent's, Pairc Tailteann, 22/7/1958,
- St. Peter's Dunboyne - Bye,

Round 4:

- Syddan 0-6, 0-3 St. Peter's Dunboyne, Pairc Tailteann, 29/6/1958,
- Ballivor w, l St. Vincent's, Pairc Tailteann, 24/8/1958,
- Skryne - Bye,

Round 5:

- Skryne w/o, scr St. Peter's Dunboyne, Kilmessan, 24/8/1958,
- Syddan w/o, scr St. Vincent's,
- Ballivor - Bye,

Final Play-offs:

- Skryne 3-1, 1-1 Ballivor, Trim, 21/9/1958,
- Skryne 0-7, 1-3 Syddan, Pairc Tailteann, 1/11/1958,

== Final ==
- Navan O'Mahonys 1-5, 1-5 Skryne, Kells, 30/11/1958,
- Navan O'Mahonys 2-6, 1-2 Skryne, Kells, 7/12/1958, (Replay)
