= Navan Gaels GAA =

Gaelic games club in County Meath, Ireland

- Gaeil An Uaimh
- County: Meath
- Colours: Green and White
- Grounds: Navan

Senior Club Championships
	All Ireland	Leinster champions	Meath champions
Football:	0	0	10

Navan Gaels GAA or An Uaimh Gaels was a Gaelic Athletic Association club located in the town of Navan in County Meath, Ireland. The club mainly focused on playing football in Meath competitions. The club was successful in the Meath Senior Football Championship during the 1920s and 1930s and won 10 senior championships. Their first came in 1907 and their last in 1938. The team dissolved shortly after this and were informally succeeded by Navan O'Mahonys GAA. The team is now defunct.

== Honours ==
- Meath Senior Football Championship (10): 1907, 1924, 1925, 1926, 1929, 1930, 1933, 1934, 1935, 1938

== Notable players ==
- Tommy McGuinness

Preceded by St Mary's	Meath Senior Football Champions; 1938	Succeeded by Kilmessan
