= 1957 Meath Senior Football Championship =

Meath S.F.C.
- Season: 1957
- Champions: Navan O'Mahonys; 2nd Senior Championship Title
- Relegated: Donaghmore
- Winning Captain: Peter McKeever (Navan O'Mahonys)
- Matches: 13

The 1957 Meath Senior Football Championship is the 65th edition of the Meath GAA's premier club Gaelic football tournament for senior graded teams in County Meath, Ireland. The tournament consists of 10 teams. For this season, the championship trialed a straight knock-out format.

No club was promoted from the 1956 Meath Intermediate Football Championship title. Navan O'Mahonys 'B' beat Dunshaughlin in the '56 final however due to the rule that no club may field two teams in the one grade, they were denied promotion. Dunshaughlin didn't enter a team in either the S.F.C. or I.F.C. for 1957.

Syddan were the defending champions after they defeated Skryne in the previous years final, however they lost their crown at the quarter-final stage this year.

Navan O'Mahonys were crowned S.F.C. champions for the second time when defeating Skryne 0-11 to 1-7 in the final at Pairc Tailteann on 8 September 1957. Peter McKeever raised the Keegan Cup for the Hoops.

At the end of the season Donaghmore were regraded to the 1958 I.F.C.

== Team changes ==
The following teams have changed division since the 1956 championship season.

=== To S.F.C. ===
Promoted from 1956 I.F.C.

- None

=== From S.F.C. ===
Regraded to 1957 I.F.C.

- Duleek
- Carnaross

== Round 1 ==
4 of the 10 teams play in this round by random draw.

- Syddan 3-6, 1-5 Ballivor, Kells, 19/5/1957,
- Navan O'Mahonys 1-6, 2-3 St. Vincent's, Skryne, 19/5/1957,
- Navan O'Mahonys 3-5, 2-6 St. Vincent's, Skryne, 2/6/1957, (Replay)

== Quarter-finals ==
The remaining 6 teams along with the 2 winners from Round 1 play each other in this round.

- St. Peter's Dunboyne 2-10, 3-7 Kells Harps, Skryne, 19/5/1957,
- Skryne 0-12, 2-5 Trim, Pairc Tailteann, 19/5/1957,
- Ballinlough 2-6, 1-5 Donaghmore, Pairc Tailteann, 2/6/1957,
- Navan O'Mahonys 0-6, 0-4 Syddan, Kells, 30/6/1957,
- St. Peter's Dunboyne 3-7, 0-6 Kells Harps, Pairc Tailteann, 2/6/1957, (Replay)

== Semi-finals ==
- Skryne 4-2, 1-4 St. Peter's Dunboyne, Trim, 30/6/1957,
- Navan O'Mahonys w, l Ballinlough,

== Final ==
- Navan O'Mahonys 0-11, 1-7 Skryne, Pairc Tailteann, 8/9/1957,
