= Meath Senior Football Championship =

Annual Gaelic football competition

- Irish: An Mhí
- Founded: 1887
- Trophy: Keegan Cup
- Title holders: Wolfe Tones (2026) (3rd title)
- Most titles: Navan O'Mahonys (20 titles)
- Sponsors: Fairyhouse Steel

The Meath Senior Football Championship is an annual Gaelic Athletic Association club competition between the top Gaelic football clubs in Meath, Ireland.

== Qualification for subsequent competitions ==
The winners of the Meath Senior Football Championship winners qualify to represent their county in the Leinster Senior Club Football Championship and in turn, go on to the All-Ireland Senior Club Football Championship.

== Competition format ==
From 2020, 16 teams compete in the championship, with four groups of four teams. The top two finishers in each group qualify for the quarter-finals. The bottom two teams in each group progress to the relegation playoffs. The overall loser in the relegation playoffs gets relegated to the Intermediate Division. In the 2020 Meath Senior Football Championship, due to the short window available to complete the championship because of the COVID-19 pandemic, the Meath county board decided that only the top team in each group would qualify for the semi-finals while only the bottom team in each group would take part in the relegation playoffs.

== History ==
Wolfe Tones went from the Meath Junior Football Championship to Meath SFC winners in the space of four seasons in the early 21st-century, featuring Meath player Cian Ward, whose emergence as one of Meath's "most exciting talents" coincided with this run, while 1996 All-Ireland Senior Football Championship-winning captain Tommy Dowd also joined the club around this time.

In the 2026 final, Wolfe Tones defeated Donaghmore/Ashbourne 1-19 to 0-12.

== 2027 Teams ==
The 16 teams which are due to compete in the 2027 Senior Football Championship include:

Club	Finish in 2026	First year of current spell at Senior Level	S.F.C titles	Last S.F.C title
Ballinabrackey	Non-Qualifier	2020	0	n/a
Donaghmore/Ashbourne	Runners-Up	2008	3	1942
Duleek/Bellewstown	I.F.C Champions	2026	1	1943
Dunshaughlin	Quarter-Finalist	2023	4	2024
Gaeil Colmcille	Non-Qualifier	2014	3	1991
Kilbride	Relegation Semi-Finalist	2026	5	1971
Na Fianna	Relegation Finalist	2013	0	n/a
Rathkenny	Quarter-Finalist	2024	5	1923
Ratoath	Semi-Finalist	2016	3	2022
Seneschalstown	Relegation Semi-Finalist	1968	4	2009
Skryne	Non-Qualifier	1938	13	2010
St Colmcille's	Quarter-Finalist	2017	0	n/a
St. Peter's Dunboyne	Non-Qualifier	1993	3	2018
Summerhill	Semi-Finalist	1972	9	2025
Trim	Quarter-Finalist	2022	1	1962
Wolfe Tones	Champions	2005	3	2026

== Top winners ==
#	Club	Titles	Years won	Runner-Up	Years runner-up
1	Navan O'Mahonys	20	1953, 1957, 1958, 1959, 1960, 1961, 1963, 1973, 1979, 1981, 1985, 1987, 1988, 1989, 1990, 1997, 2008, 2012, 2014, 2015	8	1967, 1970, 1972, 1975, 1983, 1993, 2006, 2007
2	Skryne	13	1940, 1941, 1944, 1945, 1947, 1948, 1954, 1965, 1992, 1993, 1999, 2004, 2010	18	1935, 1942, 1950, 1951, 1952, 1956, 1957, 1958, 1959, 1969, 1971, 1981, 1984, 1985, 1987, 1989, 1994, 2001
3	Navan Gaels	10	1907, 1924, 1925, 1926, 1929, 1930, 1933, 1934, 1935, 1938	5	1905, 1928, 1931, 1936, 1937
4	Summerhill	9	1974, 1975, 1976, 1977, 1986, 2011, 2013, 2023, 2025	9	1978, 1979, 1982, 1990, 2008, 2017, 2018, 2019, 2022
5	Bohermeen	7	1909, 1910, 1911, 1912, 1913, 1914, 1916	2	1917, 1974
6	Walterstown	5	1978, 1980, 1982, 1983, 1984	4	1968, 1976, 1988, 1991
6	Kilbride	5	1964, 1967, 1969, 1970, 1971	2	1965, 1966
6	Rathkenny	5	1917, 1918, 1919, 1922, 1923	1	1920
6	Castletown	5	1902, 1904, 1905, 1906, 1908	2	1903, 1933
10	Seneschalstown	4	1972, 1994, 2007, 2009	5	1977, 1986, 1992, 1996, 2010
10	Syddan	4	1949, 1951, 1952, 1956	2	1948, 1980
10	Dunshaughlin	4	2000, 2001, 2002, 2024	2	1999, 2011
13	Wolfe Tones	3	2006, 2021, 2026	3	2009, 2012, 2024
13	Ratoath	3	2019, 2020, 2022	2	2023, 2025
13	St. Peter's Dunboyne	3	1998, 2005, 2018	1	2021
13	Gaeil Colmcille	3	1966, 1968, 1991	2	1964, 2020
13	Donaghmore/Ashbourne	3	1927, 1928, 1942	9	1925, 1926, 1929, 1930, 1934, 1943, 2014, 2016, 2026
13	Kilmessan	3	1903, 1936, 1939	2	1902, 1904
13	Navan Harps	3	1915, 1920, 1921	2	1914, 1923
13	Pierce O'Mahony's	3	1894, 1895, 1896	0	–
21	Simonstown Gaels	2	2016, 2017	2	2003, 2004
21	Dowdstown	2	1887, 1888	1	1889
23	Blackhall Gaels	1	2003	1	2005
23	Kilmainhamwood	1	1996	2	1995, 2000
23	Dunderry	1	1995	0	–
23	Trim	1	1962	4	1953, 1961, 1997, 2002
23	St Vincent's	1	1955	1	1963
23	North Meath	1	1950	2	1946, 1949
23	Navan Parnells	1	1946	1	1944
23	Duleek	1	1943	1	1947
23	St Mary's (Moynalty/Kilbeg)	1	1937	1	1938
23	Moynalty	1	1932	0	–
23	Martry	1	1931	2	1922, 1932
23	Stamullen	1	1900	0	
23	Own Roes (Drogheda)	1	1897	2	1895, 1896
23	Julianstown	1	1889	0	–
–	Na Fianna	0	–	2	2013, 2015
–	Oldcastle	0	–	6	1907, 1910, 1915, 1919, 1945, 1998
–	Ballivor	0	–	1	1974
–	Ballinlough	0	–	1	1962
–	Drumbaragh Emmets	0	–	1	1960
–	Kells Harps	0	–	2	1954, 1955
–	Kells Stars	0	–	3	1939, 1940, 1941
–	Carnaross	0	–	1	1913
–	Bettystown	0	–	1	1909
–	Trim Clann na Gael	0	–	2	1906, 1908
–	Newtown Round Towers	0	–	1	1897
–	Navan Common Independents	0	–	1	1894
–	Donecarney	0	–	1	1888

== Roll of honour ==
Year	Winner	Score	Opponent	Score	Note
2026	Wolfe Tones	1-19	Donaghmore/Ashbourne	0-12	
2025	Summerhill	0-16	Ratoath	0-13	
2024	Dunshaughlin	2-07	Wolfe Tones	1-08	
2023	Summerhill	0-22	Ratoath	1-13	After extra time.
2022	Ratoath	0-12	Summerhill	0-11	
2021	Wolfe Tones	1-09	St. Peter's Dunboyne	0-09	
2020	Ratoath	1-14	Gaeil Colmcille	1-13	
2019	Ratoath	3-15	Summerhill	2-13	
2018	St. Peter's Dunboyne	1-11	Summerhill	0-09	
2017	Simonstown Gaels	2-09	Summerhill	0-07	
2016	Simonstown Gaels	1-14	Donaghmore/Ashbourne	0-08	
2015	Navan O'Mahonys	0-13	Na Fianna	1-08	
2014	Navan O'Mahonys	2-11	Donaghmore/Ashbourne	2-09	
2013	Summerhill	1-13	Na Fianna	1-10	
2012	Navan O'Mahonys	1-11	Wolfe Tones	0-07	
2011	Summerhill	0-10, 0-14 (R)	Dunshaughlin	0-10, 1-09 (R)	
2010	Skryne	0-21	Seneschalstown	4-08	
2009	Seneschalstown	1-13, 2-08 (R)	Wolfe Tones	1-13, 1-08 (R)	
2008	Navan O'Mahonys	2-12	Summerhill	0-07	
2007	Seneschalstown	1-08, 0-15 (R)	Navan O'Mahonys	0-11, 0-09 (R)	
2006	Wolfe Tones	1-09	Navan O'Mahonys	1-07	
2005	St. Peter's, Dunboyne	1-08	Blackhall Gaels	0-08	
2004	Skryne	1-09	Simonstown Gaels	0-07	
2003	Blackhall Gaels	2-09	Simonstown Gaels	1-09	
2002	Dunshaughlin	1-11	Trim	2-06	
2001	Dunshaughlin	0-11	Skryne	1-05	
2000	Dunshaughlin	1-19	Kilmainhamwood	2-06	
1999	Skryne	1-12	Dunshaughlin	0-08	
1998	St. Peter's, Dunboyne	0-09	Oldcastle	0-05	
1997	Navan O'Mahonys	1-10	Trim	0-07	
1996	Kilmainhamwood	2-12	Seneschalstown	1-06	
1995	Dunderry	1-11	Kilmainhamwood	0-10	
1994	Seneschalstown	1-11	Skryne	0-12	
1993	Skryne	3-05	Navan O'Mahonys	2-07	
1992	Skryne	1-07	Seneschalstown	0-07	
1991	Gaeil Colmcille	1-12	Walterstown	1-06	
1990	Navan O'Mahonys	0-12, 1-11 (R)	Summerhill	3-03, 0-05 (R)	
1989	Navan O'Mahonys	0-17	Skryne	3-06	
1988	Navan O'Mahonys	0-11	Waltesrtown	0-10	
1987	Navan O'Mahonys	0-13	Skryne	1-09	
1986	Summerhill	0-13	Seneschalstown	1-08	
1985	Navan O'Mahonys	0-10	Skryne	0-07	
1984	Walterstown	2-09	Skryne	1-07	
1983	Walterstown	0-10	Navan O'Mahonys	1-04	
1982	Walterstown	1-07	Summerhill	0-05	
1981	Navan O'Mahonys	0-07, 1-14 (R)	Skryne	1-04, 0-05 (R)	
1980	Walterstown	4-09	Syddan	0-06	
1979	Navan O'Mahonys	1-09	Summerhill	1-03	
1978	Walterstown	0-07	Summerhill	0-06	
1977	Summerhill	1-06, 3-07 (R)	Seneschalstown	0-09, 2-07 (R)	
1976	Summerhill	3-09	Walterstown	0-02	
1975	Summerhill	0-10	Navan O'Mahonys	0-09	
1974	Summerhill	0-09	Bohermeen	0-07	
1973	Navan O'Mahonys	1-09	Ballivor	1-07	
1972	Seneschalstown	0-09, 0-11 (R)	Navan O'Mahonys	1-06, 1-05 (R)	
1971	Kilbride	1-08	Skryne	0-08	
1970	Kilbride	0-09	Navan O'Mahonys	0-07	
1969	Kilbride	2-05	Skryne	0-05	
1968	Gaeil Colmcille	3-17	Walterstown	1-04	
1967	Kilbride	0-06	Navan O'Mahonys	0-04	
1966	Gaeil Colmcille	1-07, 3-02, 0-08 (2R)	Kilbride	1-07, 1-08, 0-06 (2R)	
1965*	Skryne	1-03	Kilbride	1-04	
1964	Kilbride	0-08	Gaeil Colmcille	0-06	
1963	Navan O'Mahonys	4-06	St Vincent's	1-02	
1962	Trim	3-08	Ballinlough	0-07	
1961	Navan O'Mahonys	1-08	Trim	0-08	
1960	Navan O'Mahonys	2-11	Drumbaragh Emmets	0-06	
1959	Navan O'Mahonys	1-09	Skryne	2-05	
1958	Navan O'Mahonys	1-05, 2-06 (R)	Skryne	1-05, 1-02 (R)	
1957	Navan O'Mahonys	0-11	Skryne	1-07	
1956	Syddan	3-04	Skryne	2-06	
1955	St Vincent's	1-12	Kells Harps	2-03	
1954	Skryne	1-05	Kells Harps	0-04	
1953	Navan O'Mahonys	3-07	Trim	2-04	
1952	Syddan	0-07	Skryne	0-04	
1951	Syddan	3-05	Skryne	0-09	Played on league basis. Final required as tie-breaker.
1950	North Meath	2-04	Skryne	1-03	
1949	Syddan	5-04	North Meath	1-03	Played on league basis. No final required - final round of league
1948	Skryne	4-10	Syddan	2-05	
1947	Skryne	3-13	Duleek	1-08	
1946	Navan Parnells	2-05, 2-05 (R)	North Meath	1-08, 3-01 (R)	
1945	Skryne	3-17	Oldcastle	2-04	
1944	Skryne	2-02, 0-06, 2-05 (2R)	Navan Parnells	0-08, 1-03, 1-04 (2R)	Played on league basis. Final required as tie-breaker.
1943	Duleek	1-07	Donaghmore	0-02	Played on league basis. No final required.
1942	Donaghmore	1-08	Skryne	0-02	Played on league basis. Final required as tie-breaker.
1941	Skryne	2-07	Kells Stars	0-09	
1940	Skryne	7-06	Kells Stars	1-04	Played on league basis. No final required.
1939	Kilmessan	2-09	Kells Stars	1-05	Played on league basis. No final required.
1938	Navan Gaels	1-03	St Mary's (Kilbeg/Moynalty)	0-05	Played on league basis. Final required as tie-breaker.
1937	St Mary's Moynalty		Navan Gaels		Played on league basis. No final required.
1936	Kilmessan	0-05	Navan Gaels	1-01	Played on league basis. Final required as tie-breaker.
1935	Navan Gaels		Skryne		Played on league basis. No final required.
1934	Navan Gaels	2-04	Donaghmore	0-09	
1933	Navan Gaels	2-05	Castletown	0-06	
1932	Moynalty	1-05	Martry	1-02	
1931	Martry	4-03	Navan Gaels	2-07	
1930	Navan Gaels	4-03	Donaghmore	1-02	
1929	Navan Gaels	0-06	Donaghmore	0-05	Played on league basis. Final required as tie-breaker.
1928	Donaghmore		Navan Gaels		Played on league basis. No final required.
1927	Donaghmore				Played on league basis. No final required.
1926	Navan Gaels	2-04	Donaghmore	2-03	Played on league basis. No final required.
1925	Navan Gaels	2-09	Donaghmore	2-03	Played on league basis. Final required as tie-breaker.
1924	Navan Gaels				Played on a league basis
1923	Rathkenny		Navan Harps		W/O
1922	Rathkenny	1-05	Martry	0-01	
1921	Navan Harps				
1920	Navan Harps	1-03	Rathkenny	0-06	
1919	Rathkenny	2-04	Oldcastle	2-03	
1918	Rathkenny				Run on league basis
1917	Rathkenny	0-05	Bohermeen	0-00	
1916	Bohermeen		Oldcastle		W/O
1915	Navan Harps	1-03	Oldcastle	0-05	Level in league; Final a play-off
1914	Bohermeen		Navan Harps		0–00 to 0-00; Harps refused to replay
1913	Bohermeen		Carnaross		
1912	Bohermeen				Played on a league basis
1911	Bohermeen				Played on a league basis
1910	Bohermeen	1-03	Oldcastle	1-02	
1909	Bohermeen	1-14	Bettystown	1-05	
1908	Castletown	2-14	Trim Clann na Gael	0-06	
1907	Navan Gaels	1-04	Oldcastle	0-03	
1906	Castletown	0-03	Trim Clann na Gael	0-02	
1905	Castletown	2-02	Navan Gaels	0-03	
1904	Castletown	1-05	Kilmessan	0-04	
1903	Kilmessan	1-03	Castletown	0-05	
1902	Castletown	0-14	Kilmessan	0-00	
1901	No Championship				
1900	Stamullen				Only affiliated team
1899	No Championship				
1898	No Championship				
1897	Drogheda Owen Roes	1-06	Newtown Round Towers	0-04	
1896	Navan Pierce O'Mahony's	1-04	Drogheda Owen Roes	0-03	
1895	Navan Pierce O'Mahony's	0-04	Drogheda Owen Roes	0-02	
1894	Navan Pierce O'Mahony's	4-09	Navan Commons Independents	0-00	
1893	No Championship				
1892	No Championship				
1891	No Championship				
1890	No result available				
1889	Julianstown		Dowdstown		
1888	Dowdstown		Donecarney		0–00 to 0-00 First game; W/O refixture
1887	Dowdstown	1-00	Kells Campaigners	0-00	

- The 1965 final was abandoned mid-game. Skryne awarded the title.

== Records ==
- Most titles:
  - 20 - Navan O'Mahonys
  - 13 - Skryne
  - 10 - Navan Gaels
- Most consecutive titles:
  - 6 - Bohermeen: 1909-1914
  - 5 - Navan O'Mahonys: 1957-1961
  - 4 - Summerhill: 1974-1977
- Most appearances in the SFC
  - 86+ - Skryne
- Most consecutive appearances in the SFC
  - 84 - Skryne: 1938–present
  - 62 - Trim: 1949-2011
  - 54 - Seneschalstown: 1968–present
  - 51 - Walterstown: 1965-2015
- Biggest win
  - 44 points - Kilmainhamwood 10–19, 0-5 St Colmcille's: 1996
  - 35 points - Summerhill 5-27, 0-7 Curraha: 2018
- Most points scored
  - 174 - Summerhill: 2019
  - 169 - Ratoath: 2019
  - 168 - Kilmainhamwood: 1996
- Most points conceded
  - 161 - Longwood: 2019
  - 153 - Duleek/Bellewstown: 2017
  - 141 - Gaeil Colmcille: 2004
- Leinster SCFC titles
  - 2 - Walterstown: 1980, 1983
  - 1 - Dunsaughlin: 2002; Summerhill: 1977

== See also ==
- Meath Senior Hurling Championship
