= Rathkenny GAA =

Gaelic sports club in County Meath, Ireland

Rathkenny
- Ráth Cheannaigh
- Founded: 1886
- County: Meath
- Colours: Black and Red
- Grounds: Dr. Townsend Park

Playing kits
Standard colours

Senior Club Championships
	All Ireland	Leinster champions	Meath champions
Football:	0	0	5

Rathkenny GFC is a Gaelic Athletic Association club based in the small village of Rathkenny, in County Meath, Ireland. The club takes part in Meath GAA competitions. The club has won 5 Meath Senior Football Championship titles. As of 2024, Rathkenny were competing at senior level. The club was founded in 1886, making it one of the oldest clubs in Meath.

== History ==
Rathkenny's first game was on 13 February 1887, against Grangegeeth. Rathkenny won 2 points to 0. The club's "golden years" were from the mid-1910s to 1923. During this period, Rathkenny won 2 Feis Cups and 5 Meath Senior Football Championship titles. In 1923, Rathkenny won the championship by playing just one game, against Martyr GAA. Just three teams entered that year and after defeating Martyr, Rathkenny were to play Navan Harps in the final in Kells. Navan Harps didn't arrive for the game and Rathkenny were awarded the title. In April 1925, Rathkenny applied to be reinstated as a junior team. The reinstatement was made on behalf of the old Rathkenny players.

Only after winning the Meath Intermediate Football Championship in 2006 did Rathkenny become a senior team again. After spending a number years as a senior club, Rathkenny were once again relegated to Intermediate ranks. In 2023, they won the Intermediate Championship when defeating Duleek-Bellewstown in the final. This meant that a return to senior ranks was secured for 2024.

== Notable players ==
- Donal Keogan
- Brian Meade
- Mick White

== Honours ==
- Meath Senior Football Championship (5): 1917, 1918, 1919, 1922, 1923
- Meath Intermediate Football Championship (3): 1934, 2006, 2023
- Meath Junior Football Championship (2): 1916, 1984
- Feis Cups (2): 1920, 1922

Preceded by Rathkenny	Meath Senior Football Champions; 1923	Succeeded by Navan Gaels
