= 2005 Meath Senior Football Championship =

Meath S.F.C.
- Season: 2005
- Champions: St. Peter's Dunboyne; 2nd Senior Football Championship title
- Relegated: Dunderry
- Leinster SCFC: St. Peter's Dunboyne (Semi-final) Kilmacud Crokes 2-7, St Peters Dunboyne 1-9
- All Ireland SCFC: N/A
- Winning Captain: Denis Gallagher (St. Peter's Dunboyne)
- Man of the Match: Ger Robinson (St. Peter's Dunboyne)

The 2005 Meath Senior Football Championship was the 113th edition of the Meath GAA's premier club Gaelic football tournament for senior graded teams in County Meath, Ireland. The tournament consists of 16 teams, with the winner going on to represent Meath in the Leinster Senior Club Football Championship. The championship starts with a group stage and then progresses to a knock out stage.

The knock-out stages of the championship were surrounded by controversy as Navan O'Mahonysl, were expelled from the championship due to the use of an extra substitute in extra-time of the semi-final. The game started in controversy too as Dunboyne had full forward Robbie Brennan sent off in contested circumstances after 5 minutes following a clash with Meath player Kevin Reilly. Having missed a first half penalty, 14 man Dunboyne led at the end of regular time but a last minute point in injury time put the game into extra time. Having 14 men for the whole semi final appeared to catch up with Dunboyne and O Mahony's ran out winners by 2 points in an ill tempered game. However having used 2 subs in normal time, the Navan club were permitted to use 3 more in extra-time but used 4. What was more galling for the Navan club was that the illegal player failed to even touch the ball late on in their two-point win. Having been advised by the Meath County board officials of the infraction at the game, Dunboyne left the decision to the Meath County Board who then asked Dunboyne to offer a replay following a campaign from the O'Mahony's club. O'Mahonys appealed their expulsion to the Meath County Board and later to the Leinster Council. On 6 October 2005, the GAA's Disputes Resolution Authority (DRA) upheld the ruling of both boards after a 4 hour meeting at Navan's Ardboyne Hotel. Navan O'Mahonys, who themselves lost twice in the group stages earlier, were left with the unique achievement of being the only club to beat the eventual champions twice in the one campaign.

Skryne were the defending champions after they defeated Simonstown Gaels in the previous years final.

Wolfe Tones were promoted after claiming the 2004 Meath Intermediate Football Championship title, their first Intermediate win.

On 9 October 2005, St. Peter's Dunboyne claimed their 2nd Senior Championship title when they defeated Blackhall Gaels 1-8 to 0-8 in a keenly fought local derby game. Denis Gallagher raised the Keegan Cup for Dunboyne while Ger Robinson claimed the 'Man of the Match' award.

Dunderry were relegated after 15 years in the senior grade.

== Team changes ==
The following teams have changed division since the 2004 championship season.

=== To S.F.C. ===
Promoted from I.F.C.

- Wolfe Tones - (Intermediate Champions)

=== From S.F.C. ===
Relegated to I.F.C.

- Gaeil Colmcille

== Participating teams ==
The teams taking part in the 2005 Meath Senior Championship are:

Club	Location	2004 Championship Position	2005 Championship Position
Ballinlough	Ballinlough & Kilskyre	Non Qualifier	Preliminary Relegation Play Off
Blackhall Gaels	Batterstown & Kilcloon	Quarter-Finalist	Finalist
Cortown	Cortown	Quarter-Finalist	Preliminary Relegation Play Off
Dunderry	Dunderry & Robinstown	Preliminary Relegation Play Off	Relegated to I.F.C
Dunshaughlin	Dunshaughlin & Drumree	Semi-Finalist	Quarter-Finalist
Kilmainhamwood	Kilmainhamwood	Quarter-Finalist	Relegation Play Off
Navan O'Mahonys	Navan	Non Qualifier	Semi-Finalist
Seneschalstown	Kentstown & Yellow Furze	Quarter-Finalist	Non Qualifier
Simonstown Gaels	Navan	Finalist	Quarter-Finalist
Skryne	Skryne & Tara	Champions	Non Qualifier
St. Patrick's	Stamullen & Julianstown	Non Qualifier	Quarter-Finalist
St. Peter's Dunboyne	Dunboyne	Non Qualifier	Champions
Summerhill	Summerhill	Relegation Play Off	Non Qualifier
Trim	Trim	Semi-Finalist	Semi-Finalist
Walterstown	Navan	Non Qualifier	Non Qualifier
Wolfe Tones	Kilberry, Gibbstown, Oristown & Wilkinstown	I.F.C Champions	Quarter-Finalist

== Group stage ==
There are 2 groups called Group A and B. The 4 top finishers in Group A and B will qualify for the quarter-finals. The 2 teams that finish last in their groups will play in a relegation play off.

=== Group A ===
Team	Pld	W	L	D	PF	PA	PD	Pts
Trim	7	6	0	1	90	45	+45	13
Blackhall Gaels	7	6	1	0	94	74	+20	12
Navan O'Mahonys	7	4	2	1	121	78	+43	10
St Peters Dunboyne	7	4	2	1	99	69	+30	9
Summerhill	7	3	4	0	92	75	+17	6
Ballinlough	7	1	6	0	51	92	-41	2
Dunderry	7	1	6	0	56	98	-42	2
Cortown	7	1	6	0	62	110	-48	2

Round 1:

- Navan O'Mahonys 1-8, 0-5 St. Peter's Dunboyne, Dunsany,
- Trim 0-8, 0-7 Summerhill, Longwood,
- Blackhall Gaels 2-10, 1-5 Cortown, Pairc Tailteann,
- Dunderry 0-8, 0-7 Ballinlough, Pairc Tailteann,

Round 2:

- St. Peter's Dunboyne 1-16, 0-8 Ballinlough, Trim,
- Trim 1-9, 0-3 Navan O'Mahonys, Dunsany,
- Blackhall Gaels 0-13, 0-10 Summerhill, Longwood,
- Cortown 2-7, 0-9 Dunderry, Bohermeen,

Round 3:

- St. Peter's Dunboyne 3-11, 2-7 Cortown, Skryne,
- Navan O'Mahonys 0-9, 0-5 Ballinlough, Kells,
- Trim 2-8, 0-5 Blackhall Gaels, Summerhill,
- Summerhill 3-12, 0-7 Dunderry, Boardsmill,

Round 4:

- St. Peter's Dunboyne 2-10, 1-6 Summerhill, Dunsany,
- Blackhall Gaels 1-9, 0-11 Navan O'Mahonys, Pairc Tailteann,
- Trim 0-11, 0-8 Dunderry, Dunshaughlin,
- Ballinlough 1-10, 0-10 Cortown, Kells,

Round 5:

- St. Peter's Dunboyne 1-9, 2-6 Trim, Pairc Tailteann,
- Navan O'Mahonys 1-11, 0-6 Cortown, Kells,
- Blackhall Gaels 4-7, 0-13 Dunderry, Dunsany,
- Summerhill 2-12, 1-5 Ballinlough, Athboy,

Round 6:

- Blackhall Gaels 0-13, 1-9 St. Peter's Dunboyne, Dunsany,
- Navan O'Mahonys 0-12, 0-8 Dunderry, Pairc Tailteann,
- Trim 0-12, 0-4 Ballinlough, Kells,
- Summerhill 1-14, 0-6 Cortown, Boardsmill,

Round 7:

- St. Peter's Dunboyne 0-15, 0-3 Dunderry, Dunshaughlin,
- Navan O'Mahonys 1-14, 0-10 Summerhill, Dunsany,
- Trim 2-15, 0-6 Cortown, Kildalkey,
- Blackhall Gaels 2-10, 1-3 Ballinlough, Simonstown,

=== Group B ===
Team	Pld	W	L	D	PF	PA	PD	Pts
St. Patrick's	7	4	1	2	105	89	+16	10
Simonstown Gaels	7	4	2	1	104	92	+12	9
Wolfe Tones	7	4	3	0	105	102	+3	8
Dunshaughlin	7	3	3	1	96	79	+17	7
Seneschalstown	7	3	3	1	90	114	-24	7
Walterstown	7	3	3	1	98	90	+8	7
Skryne	7	3	4	0	87	93	-6	6
Kilmainhamwood	7	1	6	0	71	117	-46	2

Round 1:

- Simonstown Gaels 1-9, 0-12 Seneschalstown, Pairc Tailteann,
- Wolfe Tones 3-11, 0-14 Walterstown, Pairc Tailteann,
- St. Patrick's 1-9, 1-6 Skryne, Ratoath,
- Dunshaughlin 1-10, 1-3 Kilmainhamwood, Pairc Tailteann,

Round 2:

- St. Patrick's 1-10, 1-10 Dunshaughlin, Ratoath,
- Wolfe Tones 2-5, 0-10 Skryne, Walterstown,
- Walterstown 1-12, 0-7 Simonstown Gaels, Seneschalstown,
- Seneschalstown 1-14, 0-10 Kilmainhamwood,

Round 3:

- St. Patrick's 5-14, 2-9 Seneschalstown,
- Skryne 1-12, 1-8 Dunshaughlin, Pairc Tailteann,
- Simonstown Gaels 3-15, 2-11 Wolfe Tones,
- Walterstown 0-14, 0-10 Kilmainhamwood,

Round 4:

- St. Patrick's 2-9, 1-12 Walterstown,
- Kilmainhamwood 2-8, 1-9 Simonstown Gaels, Castletown,
- Wolfe Tones 2-11, 1-9 Dunshaughlin, Pairc Tailteann,
- Skryne 3-8, 1-8 Seneschalstown, Pairc Tailteann,

Round 5:

- Simonstown Gaels 1-11, 1-8 St. Patrick's, Ratoath,
- Dunshaughlin 2-14, 0-3 Seneschalstown, Skryne,
- Wolfe Tones 0-14, 2-4 Kilmainhamwood, Carlanstown,
- Walterstown 0-13, 0-5 Skryne,

Round 6:

- St. Patrick's 0-9, 0-8 Kilmainhamwood,
- Dunshaughlin 2-11, 0-12 Walterstown, Pairc Tailteann,
- Simonstown Gaels 3-13, 1-10 Skryne, Pairc Tailteann,
- Seneschalstown 1-13, 0-11 Wolfe Tones, Simonstown,

Round 7:

- St. Patrick's 1-13, 1-12 Wolfe Tones,
- Seneschalstown 1-13, 0-15 Walterstown,
- Simonstown Gaels 1-13, 1-7 Dunshaughlin, Pairc Tailteann,
- Skryne 2-12, 1-10 Kilmainhamwood, Seneschalstown,

== Knock-out Stage ==
=== Relegation Play Off ===
In Group A, 3 teams finished on equal points with each team beating each other in head-to-head results. To decide who would play Kilmainhamwood (Bottom Group B) in the Relegation Final, a Preliminary Relegation Play Off was played between Cortown, Ballinlough and Dunderry.

Preliminary Relegation Play Off:

- Cortown 2-5, 1-2 Ballinlough, Kells, 25/9/2005,
- Ballinlough 2-8, 0-13 Dunderry, Athboy, 23/10/2005, (A.E.T.)

Relegation Final:

- Kilmainhamwood 0-8, 0-3 Dunderry, Kells, 30/10/2005,

=== Finals ===
Quarter-finals
Navan O'Mahonys	1-11
Simonstown Gaels	1-8
St. Peters Dunboyne	1-13
St. Patricks	0-9
Trim	2-11 (AET)
Dunshaughlin	0-10 (AET)
Wolfe Tones	0-12
Blackhall Gaels	0-14

Semi-finals
Navan O'Mahonys	1-14 (AET)
St. Peters Dunboyne	1-12 (AET)
Trim	0-5
Blackhall Gaels	1-10

Final
St. Peters Dunboyne	1-8
Blackhall Gaels	0-8

Quarter-final

- St. Peter's Dunboyne 1-13, 0-9 St. Patrick's, Ratoath, 10/9/2005,
- Blackhall Gaels 0-14, 0-12 Wolfe Tones, Pairc Tailteann, 10/9/2005,
- Navan O'Mahonys 1-11, 1-8 Simonstown Gaels, Pairc Tailteann, 11/9/2005,
- Trim 2-11, 0-10 Dunshaughlin, Pairc Tailteann, (A.E.T.) 11/9/2005,

Semi-final

- Blackhall Gaels 1-10, 0-5 Trim, Pairc Tailteann, 17/9/2005,
- Navan O'Mahonys 1-14, 1-12 St. Peter's Dunboyne, Pairc Tailteann, 18/9/2005, (A.E.T.)

Final:

- St. Peter's Dunboyne 1-8, 0-8 Blackhall Gaels, Pairc Tailteann, 9/10/2006,

- Although Navan O'Mahonys defeated St. Peter's Dunboyne in their semi-final, they were expelled from the championship due to the use of an extra substitute in extra-time.
