= 2004 Meath Senior Football Championship =

Meath S.F.C.
- Season: 2004
- Champions: Skryne; 12th Senior Football Championship title
- Relegated: Gaeil Colmcille
- Leinster SCFC: Skryne (Final) Portlaoise 1-11, Skryne 2-4
- All Ireland SCFC: N/A
- Winning Captain: John Quinn (Skryne)
- Man of the Match: Mick O'Dowd (Skryne)

The 2004 Meath Senior Football Championship was the 112th edition of the Meath GAA's premier club Gaelic football tournament for senior graded teams in County Meath, Ireland. The tournament consists of 16 teams, with the winner going on to represent Meath in the Leinster Senior Club Football Championship. The championship starts with a group stage and then progresses to a knock out stage.

Blackhall Gaels were the defending champions after they defeated Simonstown Gaels in the previous years final.

Navan O'Mahonys were promoted after claiming the 2003 Meath Intermediate Football Championship title, their second Intermediate win.

On 10 October 2004, Skryne claimed their 12th Senior Championship title when they defeated Simonstown Gaels 1-9 to 0-7. John Quinn raised the Keegan Cup for Skryne while Mick O'Dowd claimed the 'Man of the Match' award.

Gaeil Colmcille were relegated after 18 years in the senior grade.

== Team changes ==
The following teams have changed division since the 2003 championship season.

=== To S.F.C. ===
Promoted from I.F.C.

- Navan O'Mahonys - (Intermediate Champions)

=== From S.F.C. ===
Relegated to I.F.C.

- Ballivor

== Participating teams ==
The teams taking part in the 2004 Meath Senior Championship are:

Club	Location	2003 Championship Position	2004 Championship Position
Ballinlough	Ballinlough & Kilskyre	Non Qualifier	Non Qualifier
Blackhall Gaels	Batterstown & Kilcloon	Champions	Quarter-Finalist
Cortown	Cortown	Non Qualifier	Quarter-Finalist
Dunderry	Dunderry & Robinstown	Quarter-Finalist	Preliminary Relegation Play Off
Dunshaughlin	Dunshaughlin & Drumree	Semi-Finalist	Semi-Finalist
Gaeil Colmcille	Kells	Non Qualifier	Relegated to I.F.C
Kilmainhamwood	Kilmainhamwood	Relegation Play Off	Quarter-Finalist
Navan O'Mahonys	Navan	I.F.C Champions	Non Qualifier
Seneschalstown	Kentstown & Yellow Furze	Non Qualifier	Quarter-Finalist
Simonstown Gaels	Navan	Finalist	Finalist
Skryne	Skryne & Tara	Quarter-Finalist	Champions
St. Patrick's	Stamullen & Julianstown	Quarter-Finalist	Non Qualifier
St. Peter's Dunboyne	Dunboyne	Non Qualifier	Non Qualifier
Summerhill	Summerhill	Non Qualifier	Relegation Play Off
Trim	Trim	Semi-Finalist	Semi-Finalist
Walterstown	Navan	Quarter-Finalist	Non Qualifier

== Group stage ==
There are 2 groups called Group A and B. The 4 top finishers in Group A and B will qualify for the quarter-finals. The 2 teams that finish last in their groups will play in a relegation play off.

=== Group A ===
Team	Pld	W	L	D	PF	PA	PD	Pts
Trim	7	7	0	0	94	58	+36	14
Simonstown Gaels	7	4	2	1	104	75	+29	9
Skryne	7	4	2	1	99	79	+20	9
Dunshaughlin	7	3	3	1	84	62	+22	7
Navan O'Mahonys	7	3	3	1	80	78	+2	7
St Peters Dunboyne	7	3	4	0	85	87	-2	6
Ballinlough	7	2	5	0	57	89	-32	4
Gaeil Colmcille	7	0	7	0	52	126	-74	0

Round 1:

- Trim 1-7, 0-9 Skryne, Pairc Tailteann,
- Simonstown Gaels 0-11, 0-7 Ballinlough,
- Dunshaughlin 1-6, 0-5 St. Peter's Dunboyne, Pairc Tailteann,
- Navan O'Mahonys 1-13, 1-7 Gaeil Colmcille, Carlanstown,

Round 2:

- Trim 2-11, 1-10 St. Peter's Dunboyne,
- Simonstown Gaels 1-12, 0-15 Skryne, Pairc Tailteann,
- Dunshaughlin 3-12, 0-5 Gaeil Colmcille, Pairc Tailteann,
- Navan O'Mahonys 2-9, 0-8 Ballinlough, Carlanstown,

Round 3:

- Trim 2-14, 1-8 Gaeil Colmcille, Athboy,
- Simonstown Gaels 1-15, 0-6 Navan O'Mahonys, Pairc Tailteann,
- Skryne 2-11, 0-12 St. Peter's Dunboyne, Dunshaughlin,
- Ballinlough 0-9, 0-8 Dunshaughlin, Simonstown,

Round 4:

- Trim 1-10, 0-4 Ballinlough, Athboy,
- Dunshaughlin 2-9, 0-8 Simonstown Gaels, Pairc Tailteann,
- Navan O'Mahonys 1-13, 0-10 Skryne, Pairc Tailteann,
- St. Peter's Dunboyne 1-13, 0-8 Gaeil Colmcille,

Round 5:

- Trim 2-9, 0-9 Simonstown Gaels, Pairc Tailteann,
- Skryne 1-13, 0-6 Gaeil Colmcille,
- Dunshaughlin 0-12, 1-9 Navan O'Mahonys, Pairc Tailteann,
- St. Peter's Dunboyne 2-10, 1-8 Ballinlough,

Round 6:

- Trim 0-9, 1-2 Navan O'Mahonys, Pairc Tailteann,
- Simonstown Gaels 2-9, 1-9 St. Peter's Dunboyne, Dunshaughlin,
- Skryne 0-13, 0-12 Dunshaughlin, Ratoath,
- Ballinlough 0-10, 1-4 Gaeil Colmcille,

Round 7:

- Trim 1-7, 0-7 Dunshaughlin, Pairc Tailteann,
- Simonstown Gaels 5-13, 1-2 Gaeil Colmcille,
- Skryne 2-13, 1-5 Ballinlough,
- St. Peter's Dunboyne 2-5, 0-10 Navan O'Mahonys, Ratoath,

=== Group B ===
Team	Pld	W	L	D	PF	PA	PD	Pts
Blackhall Gaels	7	5	1	1	98	55	+43	11
Cortown	7	4	2	1	74	74	+0	9
Kilmainhamwood	7	4	3	0	81	93	-12	8
Seneschalstown	7	3	3	1	76	79	-3	7
St. Patrick's	7	3	3	1	66	86	-20	7
Walterstown	7	3	4	0	74	59	+15	6
Summerhill	7	2	5	0	74	81	-7	4
Dunderry	7	2	5	0	70	92	-22	4

Round 1:

- Cortown 0-6, 0-5 Blackhall Gaels, Pairc Tailteann,
- Kilmainhamwood 1-8, 0-10 Walterstown, Pairc Tailteann,
- Seneschalstown 2-10, 1-11 Dunderry, Pairc Tailteann,
- St. Patrick's 0-12, 1-7 Summerhill, Walterstown,

Round 2:

- Blackhall Gaels 0-8, 0-8 Seneschalstown, Skryne,
- Kilmainhamwood 2-11, 0-14 Dunderry, Pairc Tailteann,
- St. Patrick's 0-10, 0-8 Walterstown, Donore,
- Summerhill 2-9, 1-8 Cortown,

Round 3:

- Cortown 3-7, 1-10 Seneschalstown, Pairc Tailteann,
- Blackhall Gaels 2-14, 1-6 Kilmainhamwood,
- Dunderry 0-10, 1-5 St. Patrick's, Walterstown,
- Walterstown 1-7, 0-6 Summerhill, Pairc Tailteann,

Round 4:

- Blackhall Gaels 4-17, 0-7 St. Patrick's, Ratoath,
- Kilmainhamwood 0-12, 0-8 Seneschalstown, Kells,
- Cortown 0-10, 0-9 Walterstown, Pairc Tailteann,
- Dunderry 0-9, 0-7 Summerhill, Dunsany,

Round 5:

- Blackhall Gaels 0-13, 0-12 Summerhill, Longwood,
- Kilmainhamwood 2-6, 0-9 Cortown,
- Seneschalstown 0-11, 0-8 St. Patrick's, Duleek,
- Walterstown 2-13, 1-3 Dunderry, Simonstown,

Round 6:

- Cortown 0-12, 0-10 Dunderry, Bohermeen,
- Blackhall Gaels 0-10, 0-6 Walterstown, Pairc Tailteann,
- St. Patrick's 2-11, 1-5 Kilmainhamwood, Rathkenny,
- Seneschalstown 3-5, 1-6 Summerhill, Dunsany,

Round 7:

- Blackhall Gaels 1-10, 1-4 Dunderry, Dunsany,
- Summerhill 1-12, 1-9 Kilmainhamwood, Pairc Tailteann,
- Walterstown 1-9, 0-6 Seneschalstown, Skryne,
- Cortown 0-10, 1-7 St. Patrick's, Walterstown,

== Knock-out Stage ==
=== Relegation Play Off ===
In Group B, 2 teams finished on equal points. To decide who would play Gaeil Colmcille (Bottom Group A) in the Relegation Final, a Preliminary Relegation Play Off was played between Summerhill and Dunderry.

Preliminary Relegation Play Off:

- Dunderry 1-14, 1-12 Summerhill, Trim, (AET)

Relegation Final:

- Summerhill 1-12, 1-6 Gaeil Colmcille, Athboy, 17/10/2004,

=== Finals ===
Quarter-finals
Trim	4-5
Seneschalstown	1-8
Simonstown Gaels	0-20 (AET)
Kilmainhamwood	0-12 (AET)
Skryne	1-13
Cortown	1-8
Dunshaughlin	0-16 (AET)
Blackhall Gaels	0-14 (AET)

Semi-finals
Trim	0-6
Simonstown Gaels	2-13
Skryne	0-15
Dunshaughlin	1-7

Final
Simonstown Gaels	0-7
Skryne	1-9

Quarter-final:

- Trim 4-5, 1-8 Seneschalstown, Dunsany, 5/9/2004,
- Simonstown Gaels 0-20, 0-12 Kilmainhamwood, Pairc Tailteann, (AET) 5/9/2004,
- Skryne 1-13, 1-8 Cortown, Pairc Tailteann, 5/9/2004,
- Dunshaughlin 0-16, 0-14 Blackhall Gaels, Pairc Tailteann, (AET) 5/9/2004,

Semi-final:

- Simonstown Gaels 2-13, 0-6 Trim, Pairc Tailteann, 19/9/2004,
- Skryne 1-11, 0-14 Dunshaughlin, Pairc Tailteann, (AET) 19/9/2004,

Semi-final Replay:

- Skryne 0-15, 1-7 Dunshaughlin, Pairc Tailteann, 26/9/2004,

Final:

- Skryne 1-9, 0-7 Simonstown Gaels, Pairc Tailteann, 10/10/2004, Referee: David Coldrick
