= 2008 Meath Senior Football Championship =

Meath S.F.C.
- Season: 2008
- Champions: Navan O'Mahonys; 17th Senior Football Championship title
- Relegated: Kilmainhamwood
- Leinster SCFC: Navan O'Mahonys (Semi-Final) Kilmacud Crokes 1-11, Navan O'Mahonys 0-7
- All Ireland SCFC: N/A
- Winning Captain: Paddy Smyth (Navan O'Mahonys)
- Man of the Match: Stephen Bray (Navan O'Mahonys)

The 2008 Meath Senior Football Championship was the 116th edition of the Meath GAA's premier club Gaelic football tournament for senior graded teams in County Meath, Ireland. The tournament consists of 16 teams, with the winner going on to represent Meath in the Leinster Senior Club Football Championship. The championship starts with a group stage and then progresses to a knock out stage.

Seneschalstown were the defending champions after they defeated Navan O'Mahonys after a replay in the previous years final.

Donaghmore/Ashbourne were promoted after claiming the 2007 Meath Intermediate Football Championship title, their first ever year in the senior grade.

This was also Duleek/Bellewstown's first year as a senior club as the clubs Duleek and Bellewstown amalgamated before the start of the championship. Duleek were a senior club while Bellewstown played in the Junior 'B' Championship.

On 11 October 2008, Navan O'Mahonys claimed their 17th Senior Championship title when they defeated Summerhill 2-12 to 0-7. Paddy Smyth lifted the Keegan Cup for O'Mahonys while former All-Star Stephen Bray claimed the 'Man of the Match' award.

Kilmainhamwood were relegated after 14 years in the senior grade.

== Team changes ==
The following teams have changed division since the 2007 championship season.

=== To S.F.C. ===
Promoted from I.F.C.

- Donaghmore/Ashbourne - (Intermediate Champions)

=== From S.F.C. ===
Relegated to I.F.C.

- Ballinlough

== Participating teams ==
The teams taking part in the 2008 Meath Senior Football Championship are:

Club	Location	2007 Championship Position	2008 Championship Position
Blackhall Gaels	Batterstown & Kilcloon	Non Qualifier	Semi-finalist
Donaghmore/Ashbourne	Ashbourne	I.F.C Champions	Quarter-finalist
Duleek/Bellewstown	Duleek & Bellewstown	Non Qualifier	Quarter-finalist
Dunshaughlin	Dunshaughlin & Drumree	Quarter-finalist	Quarter-finalist
Kilmainhamwood	Kilmainhamwood	Relegation Play Off	Relegated to I.F.C
Navan O'Mahonys	Navan	Finalist	Champions
Rathkenny	Rathkenny	Quarter-finalist	Relegation Play Off
Seneschalstown	Kentstown & Yellow Furze	Champions	Non Qualifier
Simonstown Gaels	Navan	Semi-finalist	Non Qualifier
Skryne	Skryne & Tara	Quarter-finalist	Non Qualifier
St Patricks	Stamullen	Non Qualifier	Non Qualifier
St Peters Dunboyne	Dunboyne	Semi-finalist	Quarter-finalist
Summerhill	Summerhill	Quarter-finalist	Finalist
Trim	Trim	Non Qualifier	Non Qualifier
Walterstown	Navan	Relegation Play Off	Relegation Play Off
Wolfe Tones	Kilberry, Gibbstown, Oristown & Wilkinstown	Non Qualifier	Semi-finalist

== Group stage ==
There are 3 groups called Group A, B and C. The 3 top finishers in Group A and the top 2 finishers in Group B and C will qualify for the quarter-finals. Third place in Group B will play third place in Group C for a quarter finals place. The 3 teams that finish last in their groups will play in a round-robin relegation play off.

=== Group A ===
Team	Pld	W	L	D	PF	PA	PD	Pts
Navan O'Mahonys	5	4	0	1	79	50	+29	9
Wolfe Tones	5	4	0	1	79	61	+18	9
Summerhill	5	2	3	0	68	68	+0	4
Skryne	5	2	3	0	68	69	-1	4
Seneschalstown	5	1	4	0	50	74	-24	2
Rathkenny	5	0	5	0	45	67	-22	0

Round 1:

- Summerhill 1-10, 1-6 Rathkenny, Bohermeen, 25/4/2008,
- Navan O'Mahonys 1-11, 1-11 Wolfe Tones, Simonstown, 26/4/2008,
- Skryne 1-12, 0-8 Seneschalstown, Walterstown, 26/4/2008,

Round 2:

- Wolfe Tones 2-13, 1-10 Summerhill, Dunsany, 3/5/2008,
- Navan O'Mahony's 0-14, 0-10 Skryne, Dunshaughlin, 4/5/2008,
- Seneschalstown 0-10, 0-8 Rathkenny, Pairc Tailteann, 3/5/2008,

Round 3:

- Navan O'Mahony's 1-17, 0-10 Seneschalstown, Pairc Tailteann, 5/6/2008,
- Wolfe Tones 0-13, 0-9 Rathkenny, Castletown, 8/6/2008,
- Summerhill 0-16, 1-11 Skryne, Pairc Tailteann, 14/6/2008,

Round 4:

- Skryne 1-11, 0-13 Rathkenny, Seneschalstown, 22/6/2008,
- Navan O'Mahony's 0-14, 0-10 Summerhill, Pairc Tailteann, 22/6/2008,
- Wolfe Tones 1-12, 1-7 Seneschalstown, Pairc Tailteann, 22/6/2008,

Round 5:

- Navan O'Mahony's 1-14, 0-6 Rathkenny, Kilberry, 21/8/2008,
- Wolfe Tones 2-12, 2-9 Skryne, Pairc Tailteann, 20/8/2008,
- Summerhill 0-16, 2-6 Seneschalstown, Dunshaughlin, 20/8/2008,

=== Group B ===
Team	Pld	W	L	D	PF	PA	PD	Pts
St Peters Dunboyne	4	3	1	0	56	33	+23	6
Blackhall Gaels	4	1	1	2	50	49	+1	4
St Patricks	4	2	2	0	41	51	-10	4
Simonstown Gaels	4	1	2	1	43	43	+0	3
Walterstown	4	1	2	1	38	52	-14	3

Round 1:

- St. Peter's Dunboyne 2-15, 0-5 Walterstown, Dunshaughlin, 27/4/2008,
- St. Patrick's 2-10, 0-11 Blackhall Gaels, Dunsany, 26/4/2008,
- Simonstown Gaels - Bye,

Round 2:

- Blackhall Gaels 2-8, 0-8 St. Peter's Dunboyne, Summerhill, 3/5/2008,
- Walterstown 2-7, 0-8 Simonstown Gaels, Seneschalstown, 3/5/2008,
- St. Patrick's - Bye,

Round 3:

- Blackhall Gaels 1-9, 2-6 Walterstown, Dunsany, 8/6/2008,
- Simonstown Gaels 1-11, 0-8 St. Patrick's, Skryne, 8/6/2008,
- St. Peter's Dunboyne - Bye,

Round 4:

- St. Patrick's 1-8, 1-5 Walterstown, Ashbourne, 22/6/2008,
- St. Peter's Dunboyne 0-9, 0-8 Simonstown Gaels, Dunshaughlin, 22/6/2008,
- Blackhall Gaels - Bye,

Round 5:

- Simonstown Gaels 1-10, 0-13 Blackhall Gaels, Walterstown, 20/8/2008,
- St. Peter's Dunboyne 1-15, 0-6 St. Patrick's, Ashbourne, 20/8/2008,
- Walterstown - Bye,

=== Group C ===
Team	Pld	W	L	D	PF	PA	PD	Pts
Dunshaughlin	4	4	0	0	58	43	+15	8
Duleek/Bellewstown	4	2	1	1	69	37	+32	5
Donaghmore Ashbourne	4	2	1	1	50	36	+14	5
Trim	4	1	3	0	40	51	-11	2
Kilmainhamwood	4	0	4	0	38	88	-50	0

Round 1:

- Dunshaughlin 2-10, 2-8 Duleek/Bellewstown, Ratoath, 25/4/2008,
- Donaghmore/Ashbourne 2-15, 1-5 Kilmainhamwood, Seneschalstown, 26/4/2008,
- Trim - Bye,

Round 2:

- Trim 1-14, 0-12 Kilmainhamwood, Dunderry, 4/5/2008,
- Dunshaughlin 1-7, 1-6 Donaghmore/Ashbourne, Ratoath, 4/5/2008,
- Duleek/Bellewstown - Bye,

Round 3:

- Duleek/Bellewstown 0-15, 0-5 Trim, Pairc Tailteann, 14/6/2008,
- Dunshaughlin 1-16, 0-11 Kilmainhamwood, Walterstown, 14/6/2008,
- Donaghmore/Ashbourne - Bye,

Round 4:

- Donaghmore/Ashbourne 1-8, 0-9 Trim, Walterstown, 20/6/2008,
- Duleek/Bellewstown 5-16, 1-4 Kilmainhamwood, Simonstown, 20/6/2008,
- Dunshaughlin - Bye,

Round 5:

- Dunshaughlin 0-13, 1-6 Trim, 19/8/2008,
- Duleek/Bellewstown 0-9, 0-9 Donaghmore/Ashbourne, 19/8/2008,
- Kilmainhamwood - Bye,

== Knock-out Stage ==
=== Relegation Play Off ===
Team	Pld	W	L	D	PF	PA	PD	Pts
Rathkenny	1	1	0	0	18	3	+15	2
Walterstown	1	1	0	0	12	9	+3	2
Kilmainhamwood	2	0	0	2	12	30	-18	0

Game 1: Walterstown 0-12, 0-9 Kilmainhamwood, Castletown, 31/8/2008,

Game 2: Rathkenny 2-12, 0-3 Kilmainhamwood, Drumconrath, 14/9/2008,

=== Finals ===
Preliminary Quarter-Final
St Patricks	1-8
Donaghmore Ashbourne	2-13

Quarter-Finals
Navan O'Mahonys	2-12
Donaghmore Ashbourne	0-5
Dunshaughlin	0-7
Blackhall Gaels	1-13
Wolfe Tones	4-7
Duleek/Bellewstown	1-11
St Peters Dunboyne	0-8
Summerhill	0-9

Semi-Finals
Navan O'Mahonys	2-13
Blackhall Gaels	0-9
Wolfe Tones	2-8
Summerhill	1-14

Final
Navan O'Mahonys	2-12
Summerhill	0-7

Preliminary Quarter-Final:

- Donaghmore/Ashbourne 2-13, 1-7 St. Patrick's, Pairc Tailteann, 2/9/2008,

Quarter-final:

- Blackhall Gaels 1-13, 0-7 Dunshaughlin, Pairc Tailteann, 7/9/2008,
- Wolfe Tones 4-7, 1-11 Duleek/Bellewstown, Pairc Tailteann, 7/9/2008,
- Navan O'Mahonys 2-12, 0-5 Donaghmore/Ashbourne, Pairc Tailteann, 9/9/2008,
- Summerhill 0-9, 0-8 St Peters Dunboyne, Pairc Tailteann, 9/9/2008,

Semi-final:

- Navan O'Mahonys 2-13, 0-9 Blackhall Gaels, Pairc Tailteann, 27/9/2008,
- Summerhill 1-14, 2-8 Wolfe Tones, Pairc Tailteann, 28/9/2008,

Final:

- Navan O'Mahonys 2-12, 0-7 Summerhill, Pairc Tailteann, 11/10/2008,
