= 2007 Meath Senior Football Championship =

Meath S.F.C.
- Season: 2007
- Champions: Seneschalstown; 3rd Senior Football Championship title
- Relegated: Ballinlough
- Leinster SCFC: Seneschalstown (Quarter-final Replay) St Vincents 1–12, Seneschalstown 0–10
- All Ireland SCFC: N/A
- Winning Captain: Cormac Quinn (Seneschalstown)
- Man of the Match: Brian Clarke (Seneschalstown)

The 2007 Meath Senior Football Championship was the 115th edition of the Meath GAA's premier club Gaelic football tournament for senior graded teams in County Meath, Ireland. The tournament consists of 16 teams, with the winner going on to represent Meath in the Leinster Senior Club Football Championship. The championship starts with a group stage and then progresses to a knock out stage.

Wolfe Tones were the defending champions after they defeated Navan O'Mahonys in the previous years final.

Rathkenny were promoted after claiming the 2006 Meath Intermediate Football Championship title, their first Intermediate win since 1934.

On 4 November 2007, Seneschalstown claimed their 3rd Senior Championship title when they defeated Navan O'Mahonys 0–15 to 0–9 after a replay. Captain Cormac Quinn raised the Keegan Cup while Brian Clarke claimed the 'Man of the Match' award.

Ballinlough were relegated after 16 years in the senior grade.

== Team changes ==
The following teams have changed division since the 2006 championship season.

=== To S.F.C. ===
Promoted from I.F.C.

- Rathkenny – (Intermediate Champions)

=== From S.F.C. ===
Relegated to I.F.C.

- Cortown

== Participating teams ==
The teams taking part in the 2007 Meath Senior Football Championship are:

Club	Location	2006 Championship Position	2007 Championship Position
Ballinlough	Ballinlough & Kilskyre	Non Qualifier	Relegated to I.F.C
Blackhall Gaels	Batterstown & Kilcloon	Semi-finalist	Non Qualifier
Duleek/Bellewstown	Duleek & Bellewstown	Non Qualifier	Non Qualifier
Dunshaughlin	Dunshaughlin & Drumree	Non Qualifier	Quarter-finalist
Kilmainhamwood	Kilmainhamwood	Relegation Play Off	Relegation Play Off
Navan O'Mahonys	Navan	Finalist	Finalist
Rathkenny	Rathkenny	I.F.C Champions	Quarter-finalist
Seneschalstown	Kentstown & Yellow Furze	Non Qualifier	Champions
Simonstown Gaels	Navan	Semi-finalist	Semi-finalist
Skryne	Skryne & Tara	Non Qualifier	Quarter-finalist
St Patricks	Stamullen	Quarter-finalist	Non Qualifier
St Peters Dunboyne	Dunboyne	Quarter-finalist	Semi-finalist
Summerhill	Summerhill	Non Qualifier	Quarter-finalist
Trim	Trim	Quarter-finalist	Non Qualifier
Walterstown	Navan	Quarter-finalist	Relegation Play Off
Wolfe Tones	Kilberry, Gibbstown, Oristown & Wilkinstown	Champions	Non Qualifier

== Group stage ==
There are 3 groups called Group A, B and C. The 3 top finishers in Group A and the top 2 finishers in Group B and C will qualify for the quarter-finals. Third place in Group B will play third place in Group C for a quarter finals place. The 3 teams that finish last in their groups will play in a round-robin relegation play-off.

=== Group A ===
Team	Pld	W	L	D	PF	PA	PD	Pts
Dunshaughlin	5	4	1	0	65	52	+13	8
Summerhill	5	3	1	1	76	46	+30	7
Simonstown Gaels	5	3	1	1	71	58	+13	7
Blackhall Gaels	5	3	2	0	82	60	+22	6
Duleek	5	1	4	0	51	86	−35	2
Ballinlough	5	0	5	0	43	86	−43	0

Round 1:

- Dunshaughlin 0–11, 0–8 Duleek, Pairc Tailteann, 15 April 2007,
- Summerhill 0–20, 1–6 Ballinlough, Longwood, 15 April 2007,
- Blackhall Gaels 1–14, 1–9 Simonstown Gaels, Kilberry, 15 April 2007,

Round 2:

- Simonstown Gaels 3–7, 0–14 Dunshaughlin, Pairc Tailteann, 4/5/2007,
- Summerhill 2–9, 0–9 Blackhall Gaels, Pairc Tailteann, 6/5/2007,
- Duleek 2–12, 1–7 Ballinlough, Pairc Tailteann, 6/5/2007,

Round 3:

- Summerhill 1–7, 0–10 Simonstown Gaels, Dunsany, 24 July 2007,
- Blackhall Gaels 4–13, 0–7 Duleek, Ratoath, 24 July 2007,
- Dunshaughlin 1–12, 0–6 Ballinlough, Pairc Tailteann, 26 July 2007,

Round 4:

- Dunshaughlin 1–10, 0–12 Blackhall Gaels, Ratoath, 26 August 2007,
- Summerhill 2–15, 0–6 Duleek, Dunsany, 26 August 2007,
- Simonstown Gaels 0–14, 1–2 Ballinlough, Athboy, 26 August 2007,

Round 5:

- Dunshaughlin 0–12, 0–10 Summerhill, Dunderry, 8/9/2007,
- Simonstown Gaels 1–16, 1–9 Duleek, Skryne, 8/9/2007,
- Blackhall Gaels 3–10, 3–4 Ballinlough, Walterstown, 9 September 2007,

=== Group B ===
Team	Pld	W	L	D	PF	PA	PD	Pts
Skryne	4	3	1	0	46	36	+10	6
St Peter's Dunboyne	4	2	1	1	56	48	+12	5
Navan O'Mahonys	4	2	2	0	48	42	+6	4
Wolfe Tones	4	1	1	2	48	47	+1	4
Kilmainhamwood	4	0	3	1	41	65	−24	1

Round 1:

- Skryne 1–12, 0–7 Kilmainhamwood, Walterstown, 15 April 2007,
- St Peter's Dunboyne 0–12, 1–9 Wolfe Tones, Pairc Tailteann, 15 April 2007,
- Navan O'Mahonys – Bye

Round 2:

- Wolfe Tones 1–10, 3–4 Kilmainhamwood, Nobber,
- Navan O'Mahonys 0–12, 0–11 St Peter's Dunboyne, Dunshaughlin,
- Skryne – Bye,

Round 3:

- St Peter's Dunboyne 2–14, 1–9 Kilmainhamwood, Pairc Tailteann,
- Skryne 0–8, 0–7 Navan O'Mahonys, Seneschalstown, 28 July 2007,
- Wolfe Tones – Bye

Round 4:

- Wolfe Tones 1–11, 0–11 Navan O'Mahonys, Pairc Tailteann, 26 August 2007,
- St Peter's Dunboyne 0–13, 1–9 Skryne, Dunshaughlin,
- Kilmainhamwood – Bye,

Round 5:

- Skryne 1–8, 0–9 Wolfe Tones, Pairc Tailteann,
- Navan O'Mahonys 3–8, 0–9 Kilmainhamwood, Carnaross,
- St Peter's Dunboyne – Bye.

=== Group C ===
Team	Pld	W	L	D	PF	PA	PD	Pts
Rathkenny	4	2	1	1	41	44	−3	5
Seneschalstown	4	2	2	0	46	41	+5	4
St Patrick's	4	1	1	2	46	48	−2	4
Trim	4	2	2	0	47	51	−4	4
Walterstown	4	1	2	1	47	43	+4	3

Round 1:

- Trim 0–15, 1–7 St Patrick's, Dunshaughlin, 16 April 2007,
- Seneschalstown 0–14, 0–8 Walterstown, Pairc Tailteann, 16 April 2007,
- Rathkenny – Bye,

Round 2:

- Rathkenny 0–11, 0–10 Trim, Kilberry,
- St Patrick's 1–8, 1–5 Seneschalstown, Skryne,
- Walterstown – Bye,

Round 3:

- Trim 2–7, 0–9 Seneschalstown, Dunshaughlin,
- Rathkenny 0–8, 0–6 Walterstown, Pairc Tailteann, 24 June 2007,
- St Patrick's – Bye,

Round 4:

- Walterstown 2–15, 1–6 Trim, Kilmessan,
- Rathkenny 1–10, 1–10 St Patrick's, Pairc Tailteann,
- Seneschalstown – Bye,

Round 5:

- St Patrick's 1–9, 0–12 Walterstown, Duleek,
- Seneschalstown 1–12, 0–9 Rathkenny, Pairc Tailteann,
- Trim – Bye,

== Knock-out Stage ==
=== Relegation play-off ===
Team	Pld	W	L	D	PF	PA	PD	Pts
Kilmainhamwood	2	1	1	0	32	26	+6	2
Walterstown	1	1	0	0	21	17	+4	2
Ballinlough	2	0	2	0	5	15	−10	0

Game 1: Walterstown 2–15, 1–14 Kilmainhamwood, Kilberry, /9/2008, (AET)

Relegation Final: Kilmainhamwood 1–12, 0–5 Ballinlough, Kells, 6/10/2008,

=== Finals ===
The winners and runners up of each group qualify for the quarter-finals along with the third-placed finisher of Group A.

Preliminary Quarter-finals
Navan O'Mahonys	0–11
St Patrick's	1–4

Quarter-finals
Dunshaughlin	1–6
Navan O'Mahonys	1–14
St Peter's Dunboyne	3–10
Rathkenny	1–6
Simonstown Gaels	1–10
Skryne	0–10
Seneschalstown	2–11
Summerhill	0–11

Semi-finals
Navan O'Mahonys	4–12
St Peters Dunboyne	2–7
Simonstown Gaels	1–9
Seneschalstown	3–6

Final
Navan O'Mahonys	0–9
Seneschalstown	0–15

Preliminary Quarter-final:

- Navan O'Mahonys 0–11, 1–4 St Patrick's, Pairc Tailteann, 19 September 2007,

Quarter-final:

- St Peter's Dunboyne 3–10, 1–6 Rathkenny, Pairc Tailteann, 23 September 2007,
- Simonstown Gaels 1–10, 0–10 Skryne, Seneschalstown, 23 July 2007,
- Seneschalstown 2–11, 0–11 Summerhill, Pairc Tailteann, 23 September 2007,
- Navan O'Mahonys 1–14, 1–6 Dunshaughlin, Walterstown, 30 September 2007,

Semi-final:

- Navan O'Mahonys 4–12, 2–7 St Peter's Dunboyne, Pairc Tailteann, 7/10/2007,
- Seneschalstown 3–6, 1–9 Simonstown Gaels, Pairc Tailteann, 7/10/2007,

Final:

- Seneschalstown 1–8, 0–11 Navan O'Mahonys, Pairc Tailteann, 21 October 2007,

Final Replay:

- Seneschalstown 0–15, 0–9 Navan O'Mahonys, Pairc Tailteann, 4/11/2007, Referee: David Coldrick
