= 2005 Meath Intermediate Football Championship =

Sports event

Meath I.F.C.
- Season: 2005
- Champions: Duleek; 5th Intermediate Football Championship title
- Relegated: Drumree
- Leinster ICFC: Duleek (Semi-final), Crettyard 0-14, 1-10 Duleek
- All Ireland ICFC: N/A

The 2005 Meath Intermediate Football Championship is the 79th edition of the Meath GAA's premier club Gaelic football tournament for intermediate graded teams in County Meath, Ireland. The tournament consists of 16 teams, with the winner going on to represent Meath in the Leinster Intermediate Club Football Championship. The championship starts with a group stage and then progresses to a knock out stage.

This was Gaeil Colmcille's first year in this grade since 1986, after 18 years in the Senior grade since being relegated in 2004. .

Ratoath were promoted after claiming the 2004 Meath Junior Football Championship title, their first year in the Intermediate grade since being relegated in 1972 and only their 2nd ever period as an intermediate club.

On 2 October 2005, Duleek claimed their 5th intermediate championship title when they defeated Syddan 2–7 to 2–6 after a replay, succeeding Wolfe Tones as Intermediate champions.

Drumree were relegated after 7 years as an intermediate club.

== Team changes ==
The following teams have changed division since the 2004 championship season.

=== From I.F.C. ===
Promoted to S.F.C.

- Wolfe Tones - (Intermediate Champions)

Relegated to J.A.F.C.

- Curraha

=== To I.F.C. ===
Relegted from S.F.C.

- Gaeil Colmcille

Promoted from J.A.F.C.

- Ratoath - (Junior 'A' Champions)

== Group stage ==
There are 2 groups called Group A and B. The 4 top finishers in Group A and B will qualify for the quarter-finals. The 2 teams that finish last in their groups will play in a relegation play off.

=== Group A ===
Team	Pld	W	L	D	PF	PA	PD	Pts
Syddan	7	5	1	1	100	73	+27	11
Gaeil Colmcille	7	4	1	2	82	63	+19	10
Duleek	7	4	1	2	86	70	+16	10
St. Colmcille's	7	4	2	1	92	74	+18	9
Rathkenny	7	3	3	1	83	96	-13	7
Ratoath	7	2	4	1	59	67	-8	5
Na Fianna	7	2	5	0	84	100	-16	4
Slane	7	0	7	0	49	92	-43	0

Round 1:

- Ratoath 1-14, 0-14 Na Fianna, Dunsany,
- Duleek 1–10, 1-10 Rathkenny, Slane,
- Gaeil Colmcille 1–12, 3-6 St. Colmcille's, Skryne,
- Syddan 0-18, 1-3 Slane, Rathkenny,

Round 2:

- Duleek 1–5, 0-8 Gaeil Colmcille, Walterstown,
- Na Fianna 0-8, 0-7 Slane, Dunsany,
- St. Colmcille's 2-11, 2-9 Syddan,
- Rathkenny 2-8, 0-13 Ratoath,

Round 3:

- Duleek 0-11, 0-7 Ratoath, Dunsany,
- Syddan 0-11, 0-10 Gaeil Colmcille, Ratoath,
- Na Fianna 1-14, 1-9 St. Colmcille's,
- Rathkenny 1-9, 0-10 Slane, Kilberry,

Round 4:

- Syddan 1-12, 0-9 Duleek, Rathkenny,
- Gaeil Colmcille 0-14, 0-6 Na Fianna, Athboy,
- St. Colmcille's 2-13, 0-7 Rathkenny, Simonstown,
- Ratoath 1-8, 0-8 Slane, Duleek,

Round 5:

- Duleek 1-13, 0-6 Slane, Donore,
- Gaeil Colmcille 0-10, 0-9 Rathkenny,
- Syddan 1-11, 1-9 Na Fianna,
- St. Colmcille's 0-11, 0-3 Ratoath, Duleek,

Round 6:

- Syddan 1-15, 1-7 Rathkenny,
- Duleek 2-12, 3-5 Na Fianna, Dunsany,
- Gaeil Colmcille 0-9, 0-8 Ratoath,
- St. Coomcille's 0-11, 1-3 Slane, Donore,

Round 7:

- Syddan 0–9, 0-9 Ratoath, Dunshaughlin,
- Duleek 2-5, 0-7 St. Colmcille's, Seneschalstown,
- Rathkenny 1-15, 3-4 Na Fianna,
- Gaeil Colmcille 1-13, 1-3 Slane, Rathkenny,

=== Group B ===
Team	Pld	W	L	D	PF	PA	PD	Pts
Carnaross	7	5	1	1	104	83	+21	11
Castletown	7	4	1	2	82	73	+9	10
Nobber	7	4	2	1	97	77	+20	9
Ballivor	7	3	3	1	100	90	+10	7
Donaghmore/Ashbourne	7	2	2	3	96	88	+8	7
Drumconrath	7	2	3	2	90	68	+22	6
Oldcastle	7	2	3	2	75	80	-5	6
Drumree	7	0	7	0	38	124	-86	0

Round 1:

- Nobber 1-10, 1-5 Oldcastle, Kells,
- Castletown 1-8, 0-8 Ballivor, Athboy,
- Carnaross 1–9, 1-9 Donaghmore/Ashbourne, Walterstown,
- Drumconrath 3-16, 0-1 Drumree, Simonstown,

Round 2:

- Donaghmore/Ashbourne 0-13, 1-8 Nobber, Seneschalstown,
- Castletown 0–7, 0-7 Drumconrath, Kilmainhamwood,
- Carnaross 1-14, 0-15 Ballivor, Athboy,
- Oldcastle 0-12, 0-7 Drumree, Kilberry,

Round 3:

- Nobber 2-7, 0-11 Ballivor, Martry,
- Carnaross 3-8, 1-4 Castletown, Moynalty,
- Drumconrath 1-8, 0-7 Oldcastle,
- Donaghmore/Ashbourne 1-13, 1-2 Drumree, Ratoath,

Round 4:

- Carnaross 4-11, 3-13 Nobber, Kells,
- Castletown 1-10, 1-8 Oldcastle, Kells,
- Ballivor 0-18, 0-5 Drumree, Trim,
- Donaghmore/Ashbourne 1–12, 1-12 Drumconrath, Seneschalstown,

Round 5:

- Castletown 0–8, 0-8 Nobber, Syddan,
- Carnaross 3-5, 0-8 Drumree, Simonstown,
- Ballivor 2-9, 1-11 Drumconrath, Martry,
- Donaghmore/Ashbourne 1–8, 0-11 Oldcastle, Simonstown,

Round 6:

- Nobber 1-15, 0-3 Drumree, Bective,
- Castletown 3-6, 1-10 Donaghmore/Ashbourne, Seneschalstown,
- Carnaross 0-11, 0-7 Drumconrath, Nobber,
- Ballivor 0–14, 1-11 Oldcastle, Athboy,

Round 7:

- Nobber 1-9, 1-8 Drumconrath, Meath Hill,
- Castletown 1-18, 2-3 Drumree, Simonstown,
- Oldcastle 1-9, 1-8 Carnaross, Kells,
- Ballivor 2-13, 1-13 Donaghmore/Ashbourne, Dunsany,

== Knock-out Stage ==
=== Relegation Play Off ===
The two bottom finishers from the group stage qualify for the relegation final.

Relegation Final:

- Slane 1-10, 2-1 Drumree, Bective, 14/8/2005,

=== Finals ===
The teams in the quarter-finals are the second placed teams from each group and one group winner. The teams in the semi-finals are two group winners and the quarter-final winners.

Quarter-finals
1	Syddan	0-11
8	Ballivor	1-4
4	Gaeil Colmcille	0-6
5	Nobber	1-8
2	Castletown	0-10
7	Duleek	0-12
3	Carnaross	0-14 (AET)
6	St. Colmcille's	2-13 (AET)

Semi-finals
Syddan	1-14
Nobber	3-6
Duleek	1-7
St. Colmcille's	0-5

Final
Syddan	2-6 (AET)
Duleek	2-7 (AET)

Quarter-finals:

- Nobber 0-11, 0-6 Gaeil Colmcille, Pairc Tailteann, 14/8/2005,
- Syddan 0-11, 1-4 Ballivor, Pairc Tailteann, 14/8/2006,
- Duleek 0-12, 0-10 Castletown, Rathkenny, 23/8/2005,
- St. Colmcille's 2-13, 0-14 Carnaross, Seneschalstown, (AET) 23/8/2005,

Semi-finals:

- Duleek 1-7, 0-5 St. Colmcille's, Pairc Tailteann,
- Syddan 1-14, 3-6 Nobber, Pairc Tailteann, 28/8/2005,

Final:

- Duleek 1–9, 1-9 Syddan, Pairc Tailteann, 18/9/2005,

Final Replay:

- Duleek 2-7, 2-6 Syddan, Pairc Tailteann, 2/10/2005,

== Leinster Intermediate Club Football Championship ==
Preliminary round:

- Tinahely scr, w/o Duleek, Aughrim Park, 31/10/2005,

Quarter-final:

- Duleek 0-7, 0-6 Fingal Ravens, Duleek, 6/11/2005,

Semi-final:

- Duleek 0–13, 1-11 Crettyard Gaels, Duleek, 12/11/2005,
