= Baile an Bhóthair =

Baile an Bhóthair (Irish for 'Town of the Road') may refer to several places in Ireland:

- Batterstown, a village in County Meath
- Booterstown, a suburb of Dublin
