= 2008 Meath Intermediate Football Championship =

Meath I.F.C.
- Season: 2008
- Champions: St. Ultan's; 1st Intermediate Football Championship title
- Relegated: Ballivor
- Leinster ICFC: St. Ultan's (Final), Ballyroan Abbey 2-8, 0-8 St. Ultan's
- All Ireland ICFC: N/A

The 2008 Meath Intermediate Football Championship is the 82nd edition of the Meath GAA's premier club Gaelic football tournament for intermediate graded teams in County Meath, Ireland. The tournament consists of 16 teams, with the winner going on to represent Meath in the Leinster Intermediate Club Football Championship. The championship starts with a group stage and then progresses to a knock out stage.

This was Ballinlough's first year in this grade since 1991, after 16 years in the Senior grade since being relegated in 2007.

On 5 October 2008, St. Ultan's claimed their 1st Intermediate championship title when they defeated fellow parishioners Cortown 1-12 to 1-9, succeeding Donaghmore/Ashbourne as Intermediate champions.

Ballivor were relegated from this grade, after 5 years as an Intermediate club.

== Team changes ==
The following teams have changed division since the 2007 championship season.

=== From I.F.C. ===
Promoted to S.F.C.

- Donaghmore/Ashbourne - (Intermediate Champions)

Relegated to J.A.F.C.

- Ratoath

=== To I.F.C. ===
Relegted from S.F.C.

- Ballinlough

Promoted from J.A.F.C.

- Clann na nGael - (Junior 'A' Champions)

== Group stage ==
There are 3 groups called Group A, B and C. The 3 top finishers in Group A and the top 2 finishers in Group B and C will qualify for the quarter-finals. Third place in Group B will play third place in Group C for a quarter finals place. The 3 teams that finish last in their groups will play in a round-robin relegation play off.

=== Group A ===
Team	Pld	W	L	D	PF	PA	PD	Pts
Cortown	5	3	1	1	68	61	+7	7
Na Fianna	5	3	2	0	79	66	+13	6
St. Michael's	5	3	2	0	70	61	+9	6
Nobber	5	3	2	0	59	60	-1	6
St. Colmcille's	5	2	3	0	59	70	-11	4
Oldcastle	5	0	4	1	59	76	-17	1

Round 1:

- Nobber 1-10, 0-10 Na Fianna, Bohermeen, 24/4/2008,
- St. Colmcille's 1-11, 1-10 Oldcastle, Rathkenny, 27/4/2008,
- Cortown 0-16, 1-11 St. Michael's, Kilberry, 27/4/2008,

Round 2:

- Nobber 0-12, 2-5 St. Colmcilles, Slane, 1/5/2008,
- Cortown 2-8, 1-11 Oldcastle, Ballinlough, 4/5/2008,
- Na Fianna 2-10, 0-10 St. Michael's, Athboy, 4/5/2008,

Round 3:

- St. Michael's 2-8, 0-12 Nobber, Kilmainhamwood, 5/6/2008,
- St. Colmcille's 0-10, 1-6 Cortown, Seneschalstown, 8/6/2008,
- Na Fianna 4-13, 2-8 Oldcastle, Athboy, 8/6/2008,

Round 4:

- Nobber 0-10, 0-9 Oldcastle, Moynalty, 19/6/2008,
- Cortown 3-4, 1-8 Na Fianna, Dunderry, 22/6/2008,
- St. Michael's 2-13, 0-8 St. Colmcille's, Slane, 22/6/2008,

Round 5:

- Cortown 1-13, 0-12 Nobber, Meath Hill, 20/8/2008,
- Na Fianna 2-11, 1-13 St. Colmcille's, Bective, 20/8/2008,
- St. Michael's 1-10, 2-3 Oldcastle, Martry 20/8/2008,

=== Group B ===
Team	Pld	W	L	D	PF	PA	PD	Pts
St. Ultan's	4	3	0	1	54	39	+15	7
Ballinlough	4	3	1	0	44	38	+6	6
Syddan	4	2	1	1	39	39	+0	5
Castletown	4	1	3	0	47	46	+1	2
Drumconrath	4	0	4	1	30	52	-22	0

Round 1:

- St. Ultan's 1-9, 0-9 Castletown, Meath Hill, 27/4/2008,
- Ballinlough 1-8, 0-5 Syddan, Carlanstown, 27/4/2008,
- Drumconrath - Bye

Round 2:

- Syddan 0-13, 0-10 Castletown, Meath Hill, 3/5/2008,
- Ballinlough 1-8, 0-9 Drumconrath, Moynalty, 3/5/2008,
- St. Ultan's

Round 3:

- St. Ultan's 2-10, 0-7 Drumconrath, Kilberry, 8/6/2008,
- Ballinlough 1-9, 0-11 Castletown, Carlanstown, 8/6/2008,
- Syddan - Bye

Round 4:

- St. Ultan's 2-7, 2-4 Ballinlough, Kells, 22/6/2008,
- Syddan 0-8, 0-5 Drumconrath, Meath Hill, 22/6/2008,
- Castletown - Bye

Round 5:

- St. Ultan's 1-10, 2-7 Syddan, Pairc Tailteann, 20/8/2008,
- Castletown 2-11, 1-6 Drumconrath, Syddan, 20/8/2008,
- Ballinlough - Bye

=== Group C ===
Team	Pld	W	L	D	PF	PA	PD	Pts
Dunderry	4	3	1	0	51	35	+16	6
Gaeil Colmcille	4	2	1	1	51	36	+15	5
Carnaross	4	2	1	1	54	53	+1	5
Clann na nGael	4	2	2	0	48	46	+2	4
Ballivor	4	0	4	0	27	61	-34	0

Round 1:

- Carnaross 2-7, 1-7 Dunderry, Carlanstown, 20/4/2008,
- Gaeil Colmcille 1-8, 0-2 Ballivor, Athboy, 20/4/2008,
- Clann na nGael - Bye,

Round 2:

- Clann na nGael 1-14, 0-11 Carnaross, Bohermeen, 3/5/2008,
- Dunderry 0-11, 0-7 Gaeil Colmcille, Martry, 3/5/2008,
- Ballivor - Bye

Round 3:

- Carnaross 2-10, 1-13 Gaeil Colmcille, Moynalty, 8/6/2008,
- Clann na nGael 0-17, 1-4 Ballivor, Kildalkey, 8/6/2008,
- Dunderry - Bye

Round 4:

- Carnaross 1-11, 1-7 Ballivor, Kells, 22/6/2008,
- Dunderry 0-11, 0-7 Clann na nGael, Bohermeen, 1/7/2008,
- Gaeil Colmcille - Bye

Round 5:

- Gaeil Colmcille 2-11, 0-7 Clann na nGael, Bohermeen, 20/8/2008,
- Dunderry 2-13, 0-8 Ballivor, Athboy, 20/8/2008,
- Carnaross - Bye

== Knock Out Stage ==
=== Relegation Play Off ===
The teams that finished bottom of each group play in the relegation play off.

Team	Pld	W	L	D	PF	PA	PD	Pts
Oldcastle	1	1	0	0	8	2	+6	2
Drumconrath	1	1	0	0	14	9	+5	2
Ballivor	2	0	2	0	11	22	-11	0

Game 1: Drumconrath 2-8, 0-9 Ballivor, Pairc Tailteann, 12/8/2008,

Relegation Final: Oldcastle 0-8, 0-2 Ballivor, Martry, 23/11/2008,

=== Finals ===
The teams in the quarter-finals are the second placed teams from each group and one group winner. The teams in the semi-finals are two group winners and the quarter-final winners.

Preliminary Round
Syddan	1-13
Carnaross	2-5

Quarter-finals
Cortown	2-11
Syddan	0-15
Ballinlough	1-8
Dunderry	0-9
Gaeil Colmcille	1-12 AET
Na Fianna	1-10 AET
St. Ultan's	1-11
St. Michael's	0-12

Semi-finals
Cortown	3-14 AET
Ballinlough	1-12 AET
Gaeil Colmcille	1-7
St. Ultan's	0-12

Final
Cortown	1-9
St. Ultan's	1-12

Preliminary Quarter-Final:

- Syddan 1-13, 2-5 Carnaross, Meath Hill, 2/9/2008,

Quarter-final:

- St. Ultan's 1-11, 0-12 St. Michael's, Pairc Tailteann, 6/9/2008,
- Cortown 2-11, 0-15 Syddan, Moynalty, 7/9/2008,
- Ballinlough 1-8, 0-9 Dunderry, Bohermeen, 6/9/2008,
- Gaeil Colmcille 1-12, 1-10 Na Fianna, Athboy, (AET) 7/9/2008,

Semi-final:

- St. Ultan's 0-12, 1-7 Gaeil Colmcille, Pairc Tailteann, 14/9/2008,
- Cortown 3-14, 1-12 Ballinlough, Moynlaty, (AET) 20/9/2008,

Final:

- St. Ultan's 1-12, 1-9 Cortown, Pairc Tailteann, 5/10/2008,

== 2008 Leinster Intermediate Club Football Championship ==
Preliminary round:

- St. Ultan's 2-11, 1-10 Templeogue Synge Street Pairc Tailteann, 2/11/2008,

Quarter-final:

- St. Ultan's 0-7, 0-6 Dreadnots, Pairc Tailteann, 9/11/2008,

Semi-final:

- James Stephen's 0-3, 2-10 St. Ultan's, Larchfield, 23/11/2008,

Final:

- Ballyroan Abbey 2-8, 0-8 St. Ultan's, Abbeyleix, 7/12/2008,
