= Mulhussey =

Village in County Meath, Ireland

Mulhussey Maol Hosae
- Village
- Location in Ireland
- Coordinates: 53°26′14″N 6°37′21″W
- Country: Ireland
- Province: Leinster
- County: County Meath
- Elevation: 80 m (260 ft)
- Time zone: UTC+0 (WET)
  - Summer (DST): UTC-1 (IST (WEST))
- Irish Grid Reference: N915439

Mulhussey (Irish: Maol Hosae, meaning 'Hussey's summit') is a townland and village in County Meath, Ireland. It has a school, a castle with accompanying cemetery, a nearby church (or the 'Little Chapel', as it is commonly known) at the edge of the Kilcloon parish in Kilcock, and a religious antiquity, St Bridgid's Well, located in Calgath near Mulhussey.

== History ==
Mulhussey's first inhabitants were the Husseys, a noble Norman family in the 13th century AD. The Lord of Trim at the time sent the Husseys to an area outside Maynooth, which at the time was very important because of the large Norman castle owned by the Fitzgeralds of County Kildare.

A tower house and manor was to be built and lived in by the Husseys to look after the land and protect it for the DeLacy family of Trim. Legend has it that toward the end of the 16th century AD, the last inhabitant of the tower house and manor or Mulhussey Castle as it is known today, was a bald lady. The literal translation for Maol Hosae is 'Hussey's Summit', but folklore provides a second translation. Combining the Irish word for bald and the Irish name for Hussey (Maol and Hosae), the land protected by the Hussey family was named Maol Hosae, which was anglicised to Mulhussey.

== Geography ==
Mulhussey is located at the very south of County Meath in the parish of Kilcloon, along with neighbouring townlands Jenkinstown, Longtown, Kimmins Mill, Pagestown, Kilclone, Collistown and Rodanstown. An Post delivers mail to people in Mulhussey from Kilcock post office in County Kildare, which leads some people to believe Mulhussey is in County Kildare, but this is for postage convenience only. Mulhussey's closest towns and villages are Kilcock and Maynooth, 6 and 8 kilometres to the south respectively, Dunboyne 16 kilometres to the east, Sumerhill 8 kilometres to the north, along with Dunshaughlin 18 kilometres to the north. A tributary of the River Tolka flows through Muhussey and Kilclone townlands.

== Sport ==
Mulhussey's inhabitants are eligible to join the local Gaelic Athletic Association club, Blackhall Gaels GAA. Training grounds are located in Pagestown and Batterstown - both with modern club houses and gym facilities. The club has men's Gaelic football and ladies Gaelic football teams, with smaller teams for hurling and camogie also.

== Developments ==
The area around Mulhussey has experienced a decline in population since 1991. The Central Statistics Office census records indicate that, in 1991, the Kilcloon census town had a population of 351, which by 2002 had fallen to 309, and by the time of the 2016 census, the population stood at 280 inhabitants.

St Joseph's National School in Mulhussey, (located on the Summerhill road) which was established in 1964, had an enrollment of 74 pupils as of 2013, increasing to 81 as of early 2020.

Mulhussey Castle, or tower house, still stands today on the road from Kilcock. The Mulhussey Graveyard Restoration Society have undertaken restoration work on the Mulhussey cemetery beside the castle.

== See also ==
- List of towns and villages in Ireland
