= 2004 Meath Intermediate Football Championship =

Meath I.F.C.
- Season: 2004
- Champions: Wolfe Tones; 1st Intermediate Football Championship title
- Relegated: Curraha
- Leinster ICFC: Wolfe Tones (Final), Naas 0-8, 1-10 Wolfe Tones
- All Ireland ICFC: Wolfe Tones (Semi-final), Pomeroy Plunketts 1-7 0-7 Wolfe Tones

The 2004 Meath Intermediate Football Championship is the 78th edition of the Meath GAA's premier club Gaelic football tournament for intermediate graded teams in County Meath, Ireland. The tournament consists of 16 teams, with the winner going on to represent Meath in the Leinster Intermediate Club Football Championship. The championship starts with a group stage and then progresses to a knock out stage.

This was Ballivor's first year in this grade since 2002, after just 1 years in the Senior grade since being relegated in 2003. .

Wolfe Tones were promoted after claiming the 2003 Meath Junior Football Championship title, their first year in the intermediate grade since being relegated in the 1980s and only their 2nd ever period as an intermediate club, and in 2004, Wolfe Tones claimed their first Intermediate championship title when they defeated Duleek 2-10 to 1-12 .

Curraha were relegated after 3 years as an Intermediate club.

== Team changes ==
The following teams have changed division since the 2003 championship season.

=== From I.F.C. ===
Promoted to S.F.C.

- Navan O'Mahonys - (Intermediate Champions)

Relegated to J.A.F.C.

=== To I.F.C. ===
Relegted from S.F.C.

- Ballivor

Promoted from J.A.F.C.

- Wolfe Tones - (Junior 'A' Champions)

== Group stage ==
There are 2 groups called Group A and B. The 4 top finishers in Group A and B will qualify for the quarter-finals. The 2 teams that finish last in their groups will play in a relegation play off.

=== Group A ===
Team	Pld	W	L	D	PF	PA	PD	Pts
Wolfe Tones	7	7	0	0	119	69	+50	14
Nobber	7	5	2	0	111	74	+37	10
Carnaross	7	4	3	0	99	83	+16	8
Ballivor	7	4	3	0	90	76	+14	8
Drumconrath	7	4	3	0	79	84	-5	8
Na Fianna	7	3	4	0	95	89	+6	6
Drumree	7	1	6	0	63	111	-48	2
Curraha	7	0	7	0	49	118	-69	0

Round 1:

- Wolfe Tones 1-5, 0-4 Curraha, Duleek,
- Nobber 2-13, 0-5 Drumconrath, Meath Hill,
- Na Fianna 1-14, 0-6 Carnaross, Dunsany,
- Ballivor 2-9, 0-9 Drumree, Summerhill,

Round 2:

- Wolfe Tones 1-7, 0-9 Ballivor, Dunderry,
- Nobber 3-19, 0-8 Curraha, Slane
- Drumconrath 0-11, 0-8 Carnaross, Kilmainhamwood,
- Na Fianna 2-12, 2-6 Drumree, Summerhill,

Round 3:

- Wolfe Tones 5-10, 0-10 Na Fianna, Dunderry,
- Nobber 0-13, 1-8 Ballivor, Pairc Tailteann,
- Carnaross 2-13, 2-3 Drumree, Bective,
- Drumconrath 2-12, 0-8 Curraha, Rathkenny,

Round 4:

- Wolfe Tones 2-11, 2-6 Carnaross, Kells,
- Nobber 1-8, 1-7 Na Fianna, Dunsany,
- Drumconrath 1-10, 1-6 Drumree, Walterstown,
- Ballivor 1-10, 0-8 Curraha, Dunsany,

Round 5:

- Wolfe Tones 3-16, 0-7 Drumree, Skryne,
- Carnaross 1-12, 1-8 Nobber, Carlanstown,
- Ballivor 1-12, 0-7 Drumconrath, Simonstown,
- Na Fianna 2-13, 0-6 Curraha, Dunsany,

Round 6:

- Wolfe Tones 1-12, 2-6 Drumconrath, Castletown,
- Nobber 2-8, 0-6 Drumree, Bective,
- Carnaross 2-15, 0-8 Curraha, Kilberry,
- Ballivor 2-11, 1-8 Na Fianna,

Round 7:

- Wolfe Tones 2-13, 2-9 Nobber, Castletown,
- Carnaross 2-12, 0-10 Ballivor, Kells,
- Drumconrath 0-12, 1-7 Na Fianna, Bective,
- Drumree 1-8, 0-7 Curraha, Dunshaughlin,

=== Group B ===
Team	Pld	W	L	D	PF	PA	PD	Pts
Duleek	7	5	1	1	86	61	+25	11
Syddan	7	5	2	0	82	75	+7	10
Oldcastle	7	5	2	0	84	57	+27	10
Castletown	7	4	2	1	80	68	+12	9
St. Colmcille's	7	2	4	1	62	66	-4	5
Rathkenny	7	2	4	1	65	91	-26	5
Slane	7	1	4	2	71	88	-17	4
Donaghmore/Ashbourne	7	0	5	2	58	82	-24	2

Round 1:

- Duleek 0-12,0-6 Rathkenny, Donore,
- Oldcastle 0-9, 0-7 St. Colmcille's,
- Syddan 0-11, 0-6 Donaghmore/Ashbourne, Duleek,
- Castletown 1-12, 0-6 Slane, Rathkenny,

Round 2:

- Duleek 1-8, 0-8 St. Colmcille's, Stamullen,
- Oldcastle 0-11, 0-6 Slane, Simonstown,
- Syddan 1-9, 1-8 Castletown, Drumconrath,
- Rathkenny 0-12, 1-6 Donaghmore/Ashbourne,

Round 3:

- Duleek 0-11, 0-11 Slane, Donore,
- Oldcastle 1-13, 0-8 Castletown,
- Rathkenny 1-6, 0-8 Syddan, Slane,
- Donaghmore/Ashbourne 2-5, 0-11 St. Colmcille's, Duleek,

Round 4:

- Duleek 1-9, 0-10 Oldcastle, Kilberry,
- Syddan 0-11, 1-6 St. Colmcille's, Duleek,
- Slane 1-11, 0-11 Donaghmore/Ashbourne, Duleek,
- Castletown 2-11, 0-9 Rathkenny, Syddan,

Round 5:

- Castletown 2-5, 0-9 Duleek, Rathkenny,
- Oldcastle 0-12, 1-5 Donaghmore/Ashbourne,
- Syddan 2-11, 2-8 Slane, Rathkenny,
- St. Colmcille's 1-9, 0-10 Rathkenny, Duleek,

Round 6:

- Duleek 0-13, 0-4 Donaghmore/Ashbourne, Ratoath,
- Syddan 0-12, 1-5 Oldcastle, Kells,
- Slane 1-12, 1-12 Rathkenny, Kilberry,
- Castletown 1-6, 0-7 St. Colmcille's,

Round 7:

- Duleek 1-15, 1-8 Syddan, Donore,
- Oldcastle 2-12, 0-4 Rathkenny,
- St. Colmcille's 0-8, 0-5 Slane, Duleek,
- Castletown 1-6, 1-6 Donaghmore/Ashbourne,

== Knock-out stage ==
=== Relegation play off ===
The two bottom finishers from the group stage qualify for the relegation final.

Relegation final:

- Donaghmore/Ashbourne 0-10, 1-4 Curraha, Ratoath,

=== Finals ===
The teams in the quarter-finals are the second placed teams from each group and one group winner. The teams in the semi-finals are two group winners and the quarter-final winners.

Quarter-finals
1	Wolfe Tones	1-13 (AET)
8	Castletown	1-11 (AET)
4	Nobber	2-11
5	Oldcastle	1-9
2	Carnaross	2-9
7	Syddan	0-13
3	Duleek	1-12
6	Ballivor	0-7

Semi-finals
Wolfe Tones	3-11
Nobber	1-6
Carnaross	0-9
Duleek	0-16

Final
Wolfe Tones	2-10
Duleek	1-12

Quarter-finals:

- Duleek 1-12, 0-7 Ballivor, Dunsany, 5/9/2004,
- Nobber 2-11, 1-9 Oldcastle, Kells, 5/9/2004,
- Wolfe Tones 1-13, 1-11 Castletown, Nobber, 5/9/2004, (AET)
- Carnaross 2-9, 0-13 Syddan, Moynalty, 5/9/2004,

Semi-finals:

- Duleek 0-16, 0-9 Carnaross, Pairc Tailteann, 19/9/2004,
- Wolfe Tones 3-11, 1-6 Nobber, Pairc Tailteann, 19/9/2004,

Final:

- Wolfe Tones 2-10, 1-12 Duleek, Pairc Tailteann, 3/10/2004,

== Leinster Intermediate Club Football Championship ==
Preliminary round:

- Wolfe Tones 1-10, 2-5 Ballymore, Kilberry, 13/11/2004,

Quarter-final:

- Wolfe Tones 2-6, 0-6 Parnells, Kilberry, 20/11/2004,

Semi-final:

- Wolfe Tones 2-13, 1-7 Avondale, Kilberry, 28/11/2004,

Final:

- Wolfe Tones 1-10, 0-8 Naas, Kilberry, 4/12/2004,

== All-Ireland Intermediate Club Football Championship ==
Semi-final:

- Pomeroy Plunketts 1-7, 0-7 Wolfe Tones, Breffni Park, 20/2/2005,
