= 2007 Meath Intermediate Football Championship =

Meath I.F.C.
- Season: 2007
- Champions: Donaghmore/Ashbourne; 4th Intermediate Football Championship title
- Relegated: Ratoath
- Leinster ICFC: Donaghmore/Ashboourne (Final), Fingal Ravens 1-9, 0-9 Donaghmore/Ashboourne
- All Ireland ICFC: N/A

The 2007 Meath Intermediate Football Championship is the 81st edition of the Meath GAA's premier club Gaelic football tournament for intermediate graded teams in County Meath, Ireland. The tournament consists of 16 teams, with the winner going on to represent Meath in the Leinster Intermediate Club Football Championship. The championship starts with a group stage and then progresses to a knock out stage.

This was Cortown's first year in this grade since 1996, after 10 years in the Senior grade since being relegated in 2006.

On 21 October 2007, Donaghmore/Ashbourne claimed their 4th Intermediate championship title when they defeated Castletown 1-15 to 1-11, succeeding Rathkenny as Intermediate champions.

Ratoath were relegated from this grade, after 2 years as an Intermediate club.

== Team changes ==
The following teams have changed division since the 2006 championship season.

=== From I.F.C. ===
Promoted to S.F.C.

- Rathkenny - (Intermediate Champions)

Relegated to J.A.F.C.

- Slane

=== To I.F.C. ===
Relegted from S.F.C.

- Cortown

Promoted from J.A.F.C.

- St. Ultan's - (Junior 'A' Champions)

== Group stage ==
There are 3 groups called Group A, B and C. The 3 top finishers in Group A and the top 2 finishers in Group B and C will qualify for the quarter-finals. Third place in Group B will play third place in Group C for a quarter finals place. The 3 teams that finish last in their groups will play in a round-robin relegation play off.

=== Group A ===
| Team | Pld | W | L | D | PF | PA | PD | Pts |
|---|---|---|---|---|---|---|---|---|
| Nobber | 5 | 4 | 0 | 1 | 67 | 50 | +17 | 9 |
| Gaeil Colmcille | 5 | 3 | 0 | 2 | 59 | 39 | +20 | 8 |
| Castletown | 5 | 2 | 2 | 1 | 56 | 43 | +13 | 5 |
| Na Fianna | 5 | 2 | 3 | 0 | 50 | 57 | -7 | 4 |
| Oldcastle | 5 | 1 | 4 | 0 | 40 | 50 | -10 | 2 |
| Ballivor | 5 | 1 | 4 | 0 | 35 | 71 | -36 | 2 |

Round 1:

- Nobber 1-13, 1-9 Oldcastle, Carlanstown,
- Gaeil Colmcille 3-11, 0-7 Ballivor, Bohermeen,
- Castletown 0-9, 1-4 Na Fianna, Dunsany,

Round 2:

- Nobber 0-8, 1-5 Gaeil Colmcille, Carlanstown,
- Oldcastle 1-7, 0-9 Castletown, Kells,
- Na Fianna 2-9, 2-8 Ballivor, Summerhill,

Round 3:

- Nobber 1-14, 2-2 Ballivor, Cortown,
- Gaeil Colmcille 1-4, 0-7 Castletown, Carlanstown,
- Na Fianna 1-9, 1-7 Oldcastle, Athboy, 10/6/2007,

Round 4:

- Nobber 0-13, 1-7 Na Fianna, Dunderry, 25/8/2007,
- Gaeil Colmcille 1-10, 0-8 Oldcastle, Ballinlough,
- Castletown 2-13, 1-3 Ballivor, Cortown,

Round 5:

- Nobber 1-10, 1-9 Castletown, Meath Hill, 9/9/2007,
- Gaeil Colmcille 1-8, 0-9 Na Fianna, Ballivor,
- Ballivor -, - Oldcastle, Longwood, 6/9/2007,

=== Group B ===
| Team | Pld | W | L | D | PF | PA | PD | Pts |
|---|---|---|---|---|---|---|---|---|
| Dunderry | 4 | 3 | 1 | 0 | 45 | 41 | +4 | 6 |
| Drumconrath | 4 | 2 | 2 | 0 | 44 | 42 | +2 | 4 |
| St. Colmcille's | 4 | 2 | 2 | 0 | 54 | 53 | +1 | 4 |
| Syddan | 4 | 2 | 2 | 0 | 44 | 43 | +1 | 4 |
| Ratoath | 4 | 1 | 3 | 0 | 36 | 44 | -8 | 2 |

Round 1:

- St. Colmcille's 1-9, 0-10 Drumconrath, Slane,
- Syddan 0-9, 0-2 Ratoath, Dunsany,
- Dunderry - Bye

Round 2:

- Dunderry 0-13, 0-12 St. Colmcille's, Pairc Tailteann,
- Drumconrath 2-8, 1-8 Syddan, Nobber,
- Ratoath - Bye,

Round 3:

- Dunderry 1-7, 1-5 Raoath, Bective,
- Syddan 1-12, 1-10 St. Colmcille's, Slane,
- Drumconrath - Bye,

Round 4:

- Drumconrath 0-12, 0-8 Dunderry, Kilberry,
- St. Colmcille's 3-8, 1-12 Ratoath, Skryne,
- Syddan - Bye,

Round 5:

- Dunderry 2-8, 0-9 Syddan, Simonstown,
- Ratoath 0-11, 0-8 Drumconrath, Walterstown, 8/9/2007,
- St. Colmcille's - Bye,

=== Group C ===
| Team | Pld | W | L | D | PF | PA | PD | Pts |
|---|---|---|---|---|---|---|---|---|
| Donaghmore/Ashbourne | 4 | 3 | 1 | 0 | 60 | 38 | +22 | 6 |
| Carnaross | 4 | 2 | 1 | 1 | 54 | 49 | +6 | 5 |
| St. Ultan's | 4 | 2 | 2 | 0 | 47 | 38 | +9 | 4 |
| St. Michael's | 4 | 1 | 2 | 1 | 42 | 53 | -11 | 3 |
| Cortown | 4 | 1 | 3 | 0 | 32 | 57 | -25 | 2 |

Round 1:

- Carnaross 1-10, 1-10 St. Michael's, Rathkenny, 15/4/2007,
- Cortown 1-7, 0-8 St. Ultan's, Athboy,
- Donaghmore/Ashbourne - Bye,

Round 2:

- Carnaross 1-11, 0-10 Donaghmore/Ashbourne, Pairc Tailteann,
- St. Michael's 2-8, 1-10 Cortown, Kells,
- St. Ultan's - Bye,

Round 3:

- Donaghmore/Ashbourne 1-7, 1-6 St. Ultan's, Walterstown,
- Carnaross 2-7, 0-5 Cortown, Kells,
- St. Michael's - Bye,

Round 4:

- Donaghmore/Ashbourne 2-12, 1-8 St. Michael's, Walterstown,
- St. Ultan's 3-12, 2-8 Carnaross, Kilmainhamwood,
- Cortown - Bye,

Round 5:

- Donaghmore/Ashbourne 4-10, 0-4 Cortown, Simonstown,
- St. Ultan's 1-6, 0-4 St. Michael's, Kells, 8/9/2007,
- Carnaross - Bye,

== Knock-out Stage ==
=== Relegation Play Off ===
| Team | Pld | W | L | D | PF | PA | PD | Pts |
|---|---|---|---|---|---|---|---|---|
| Cortown | 1 | 1 | 0 | 0 | 16 | 7 | +9 | 2 |
| Ballivor | 1 | 1 | 0 | 0 | 10 | 8 | +2 | 2 |
| Ratoath | 2 | 0 | 2 | 0 | 15 | 26 | -11 | 0 |

Game 1: Ballivor 0-10, 1-5 Ratoath, Dunsany,

Relegation Final: Cortown 2-10, 0-7 Ratoath, Bective, 7/10/2007,

=== Finals ===
The teams in the quarter-finals are the second placed teams from each group and one group winner. The teams in the semi-finals are two group winners and the quarter-final winners.

Preliminary Round
St. Ultan's | 3-8
St. Colmcilles | 0-6

Quarter-finals
Nobber | 1-15
St. Ultan's | 0-13
Donaghmore/Ashbourne | 1-12
Drumconrath | 1-6
Gaeil Colmcille | 1-9
Carnaross | 0-7
Dunderry | 0-12
Castletown | 2-7

Semi-finals
Nobber | 1-8
Donaghmore/Ashbourne | 2-10
Gaeil Colmcille | 0-6
Castletown | 0-10

Final
Donaghmore/Ashbourne | 1-15
Castletown | 1-11

Preliminary Quarter-Final:

- St. Ultan's 3-8, 0-6 St. Colmcille's, Pairc Tailteann,

Quarter-final:

- Nobber 1-15, 0-13 St. Ultan's, Pairc Tailteann,
- Donaghmore/Ashbourne 1-12, 1-6 Drumconrath, Pairc Tailteann, 23/9/2007,
- Gaeil Colmcille 1-9, 0-7 Carnaross, Carlanstown,
- Castletown 2-7, 0-12 Dunderry, Pairc Tailteann,

Semi-final:

- Donaghmore/Ashbourne 2-10, 1-8 Nobber, Pairc Tailteann, 7/10/2007,
- Castletown 0-10, 0-6 Gaeil Colmcille, Pairc Tailteann, 7/10/2007,

Final:

- Donaghmore/Ashbourne 1-15, 1-11 Castletown Pairc Tailteann, 21/10/2007,

== Leinster Intermediate Club Football Championship ==
Preliminary round:

- Dundalk Gaels 2-10, 1-21 Donaghmore/Ashbourne, Dundalk, 4/11/2007, (A.E.T.)

Quarter-final:

- Donaghmore/Ashbourne 6-9, 1-5 Stratford, Pairc Tailteann, 11/11/2007,

Semi-final:

- Edenderry 1-10, 1-16 Donaghmore/Ashbourne, Edenderry, 25/11/2007, (A.E.T.),

Final:

- Fingal Ravens 1-9, 0-9 Donaghmore/Ashbourne, Parnell Park, 9/12/2007,
