= Kilcloon =

Parish in County Meath, Ireland

Kilcloon Coill Chluana
- Parish
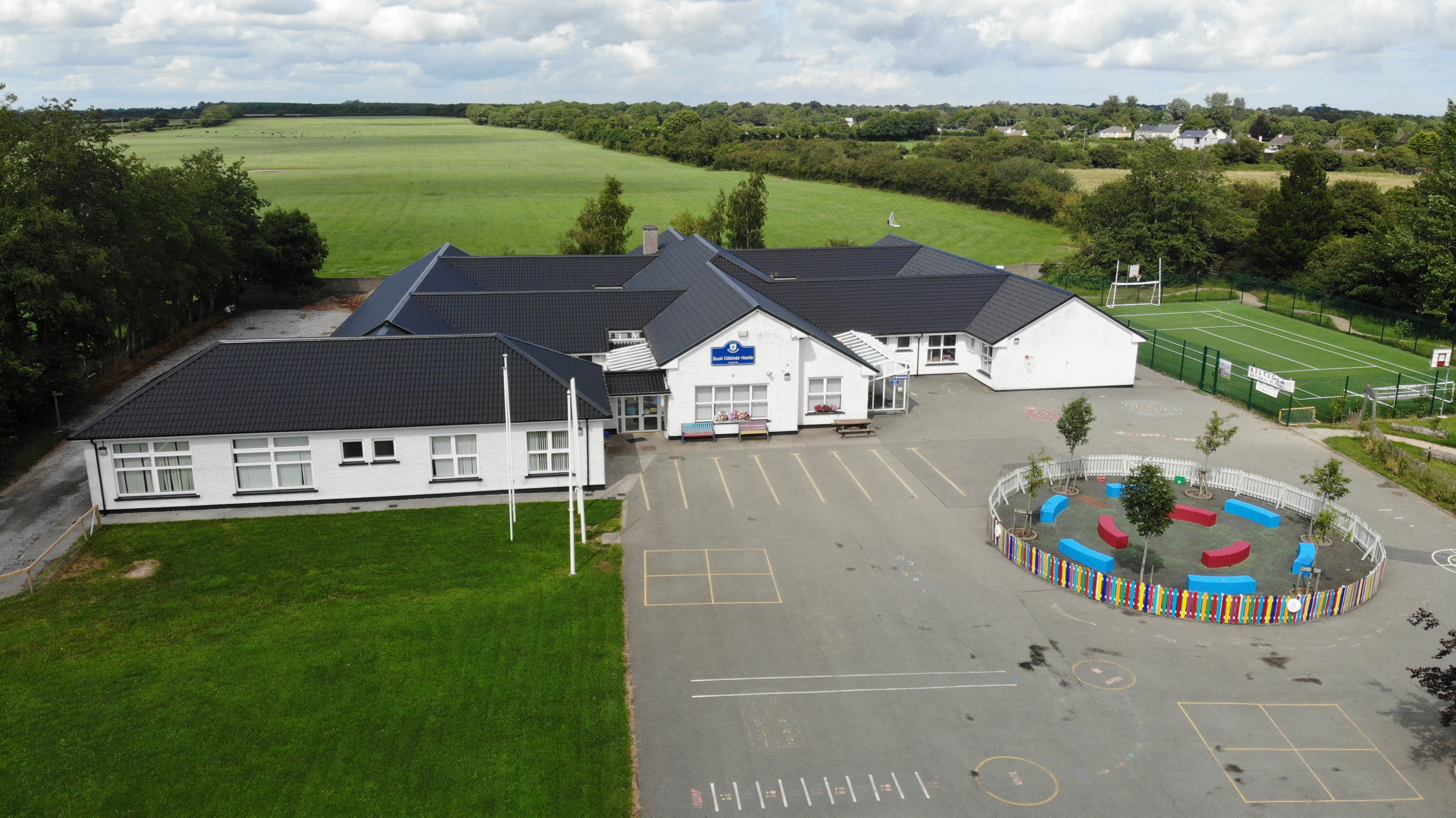
- Kilcloon's Scoil Oilibheir Naofa national school

- Location in Ireland
- Coordinates: 53°25′25″N 6°34′28″W
- Country: Ireland
- Province: Leinster
- County: County Meath

Population (2016)
  - Total: 280
- (census town; not fully coterminous with village or parish)
- Time zone: UTC+0 (WET)
  - Summer (DST): UTC-1 (IST (WEST))
- Irish Grid Reference: N944425

Kilcloon or Kilclone (Irish: Coill Chluana, meaning 'woodland of the meadow') is a parish situated in the south-east of County Meath in Ireland. Kilcloon parish is largely rural and contains the village of Kilcloon itself and the neighbouring villages of Batterstown and Mulhussey. The parish church is located at Ballynare Cross Roads in the village of Kilcloon with chapels in Kilcock and Batterstown.

== Village ==
Kilcloon village is centered at Ballynare Cross Roads where the parish church is located. Kilcloon National School is also located in the village.

The Central Statistics Office also defines Kilcloon as a built up area (or "urban area") with a population of 280 at the 2016 census. The census town encompasses a much larger area than the village (See Maps below).

== Parish ==
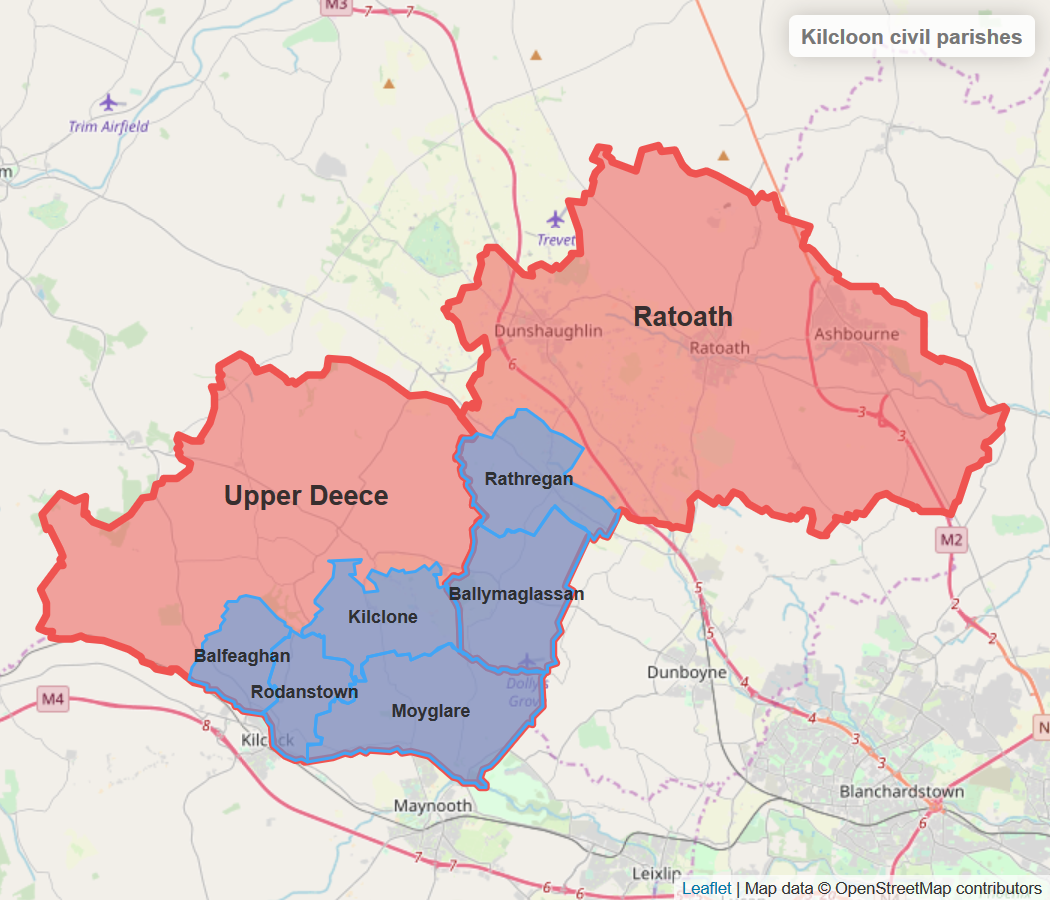
Civil parishes in Kilcloon

Kilcloon parish is composed of the six medieval parishes of Moyglare, Kilclone, Balfeighan, Rodanstown, Ballymaglassan and Rathregan. The medieval parish of Kilclone was in turn made up of the townlands of Kilclone, Pagestown, Mulhussey, Milltown, Longtown, Jenkinstown, Collistown, Barstown, and Kimmin's Mill. The medieval parish of Kilclone was also known as Kilcloon and this was the name given to the union of the six medieval parishes in the 18th century.

The modern parish of Kilcloon approximates to the civil parishes that had by the 19th century replaced the medieval parishes for census and taxation purposes. For instance, Kilclone civil parish does not include Jenkinstown or Barstown townlands.

Kilcloon is also defined as a postal town by An Post, though with the introduction of Eircodes in 2015, this has been subsumed into the A85 (Dunshaughlin) routing key. Kilcloon postal town only covers a portion of Kilcloon parish (See Maps below).

== Maps ==
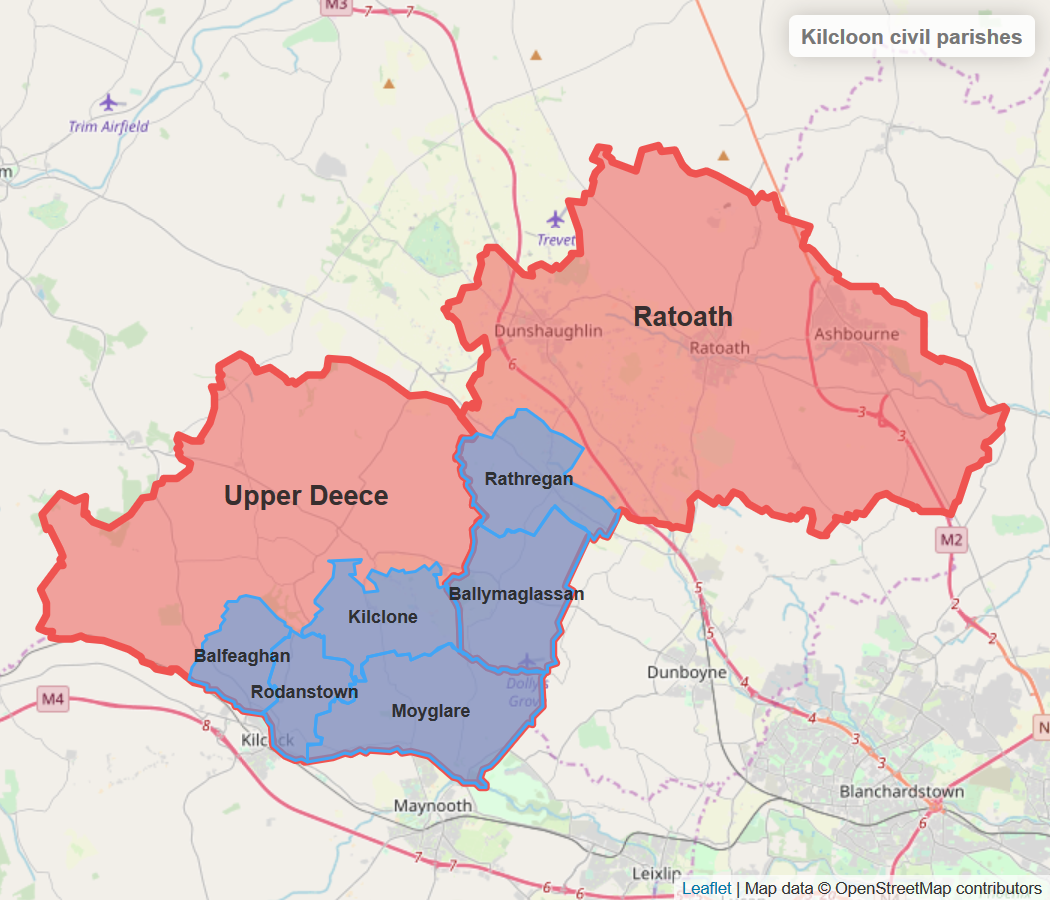
Civil parishes in Kilcloon

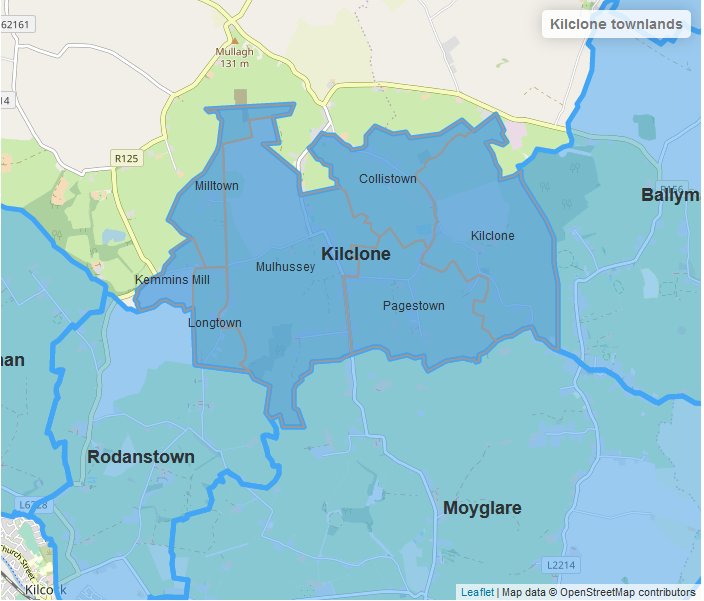
Kilclone civil parish and its townlands

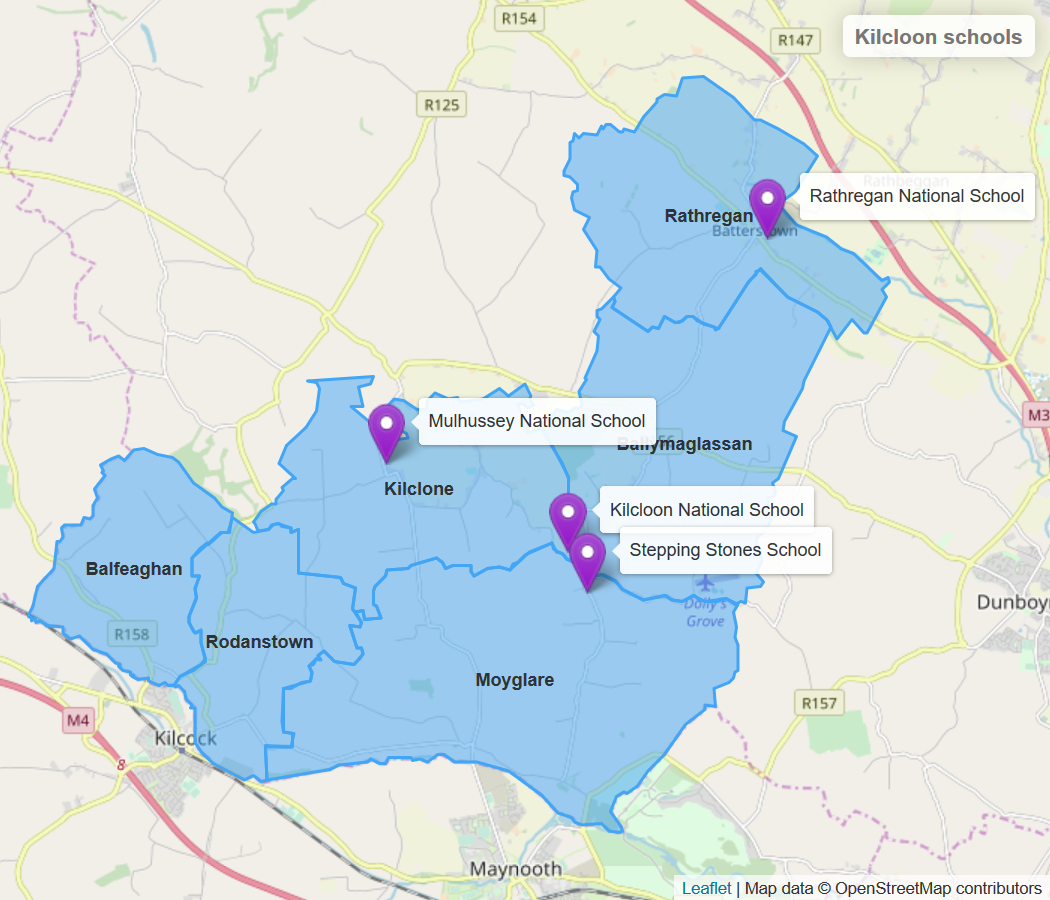
Schools in Kilcloon

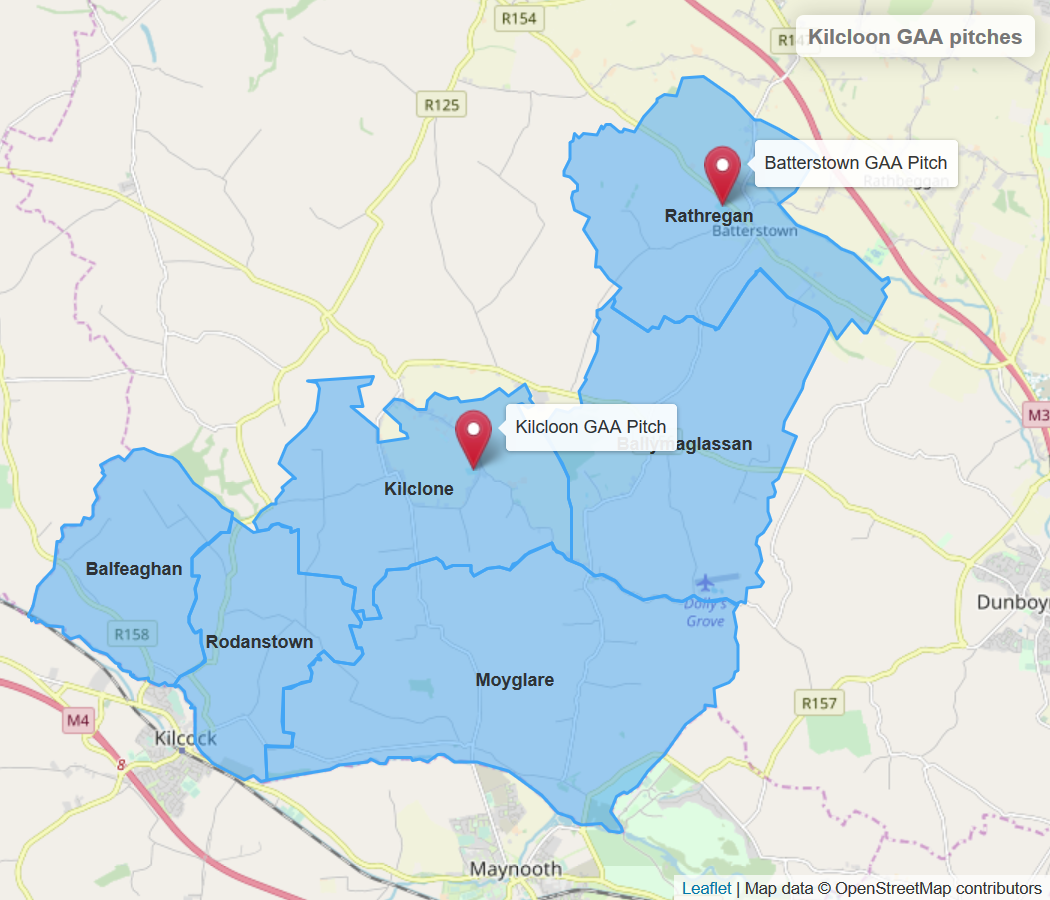
Kilcloon GAA pitches

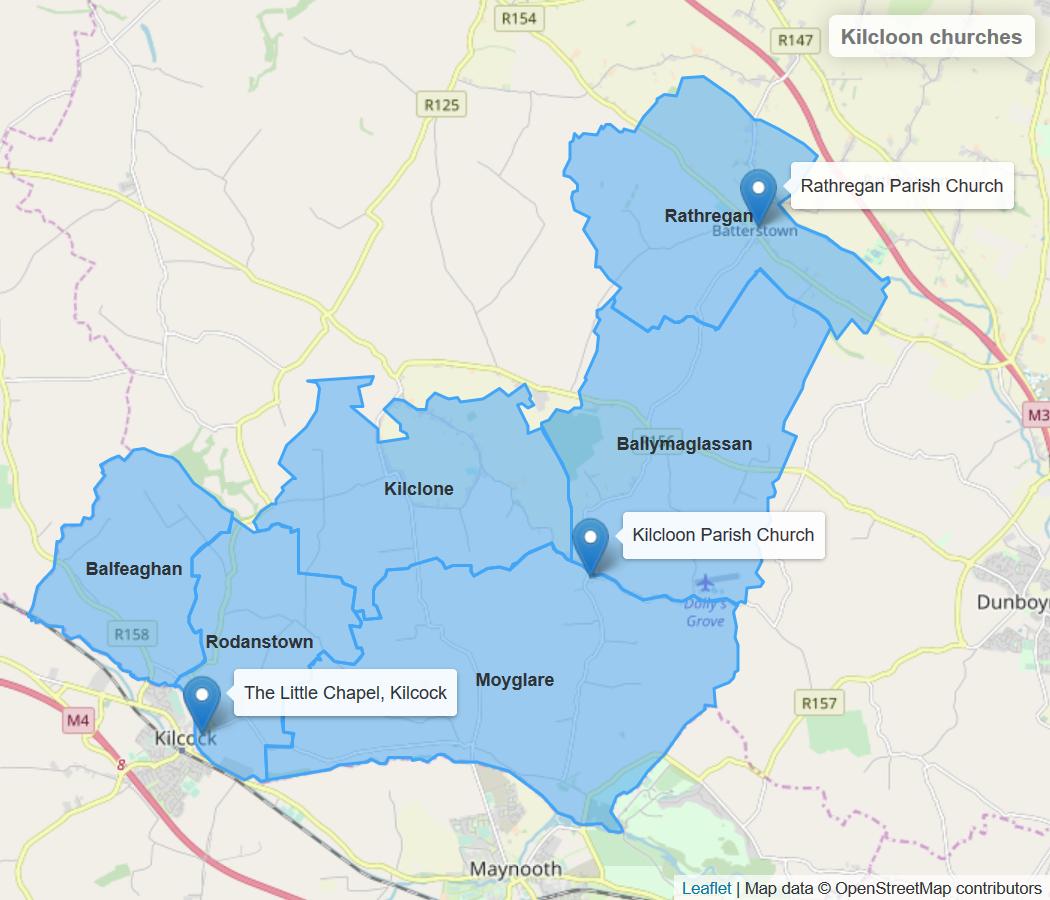
Churches in Kilcloon

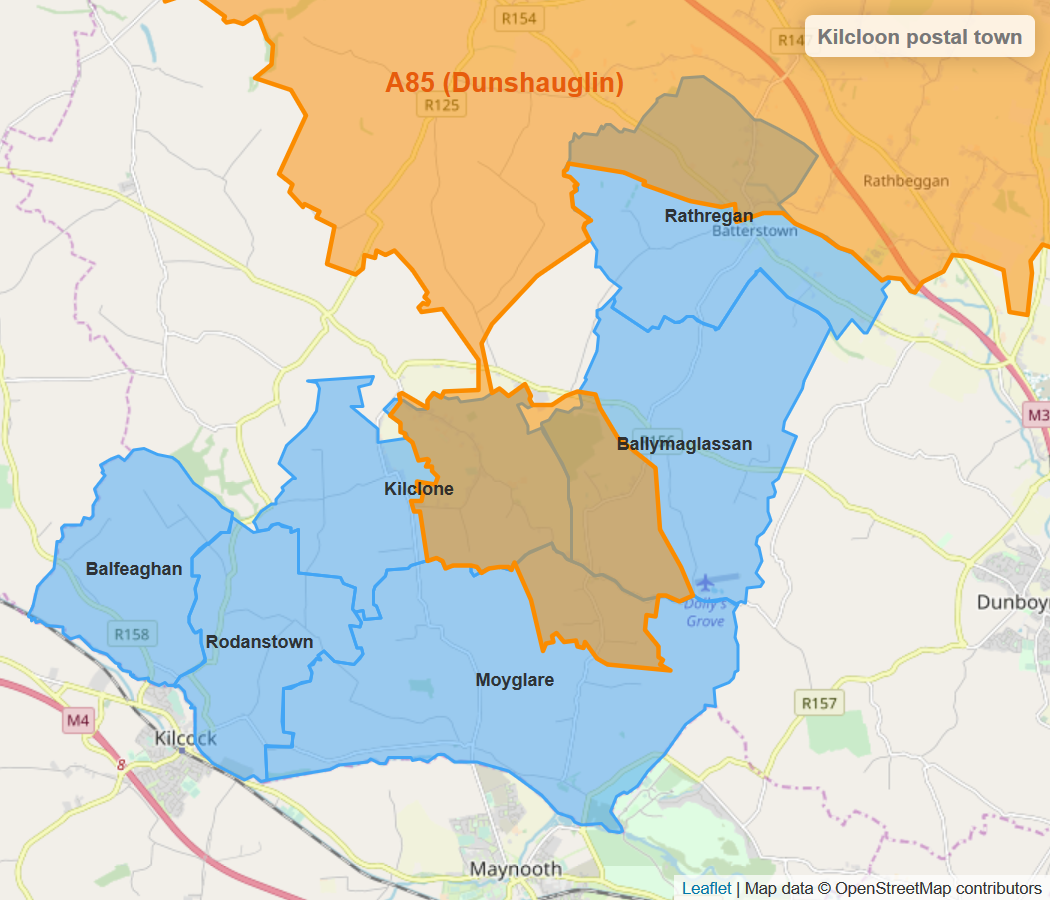
Kilcloon postal town (part of A85 Eircode routing key)

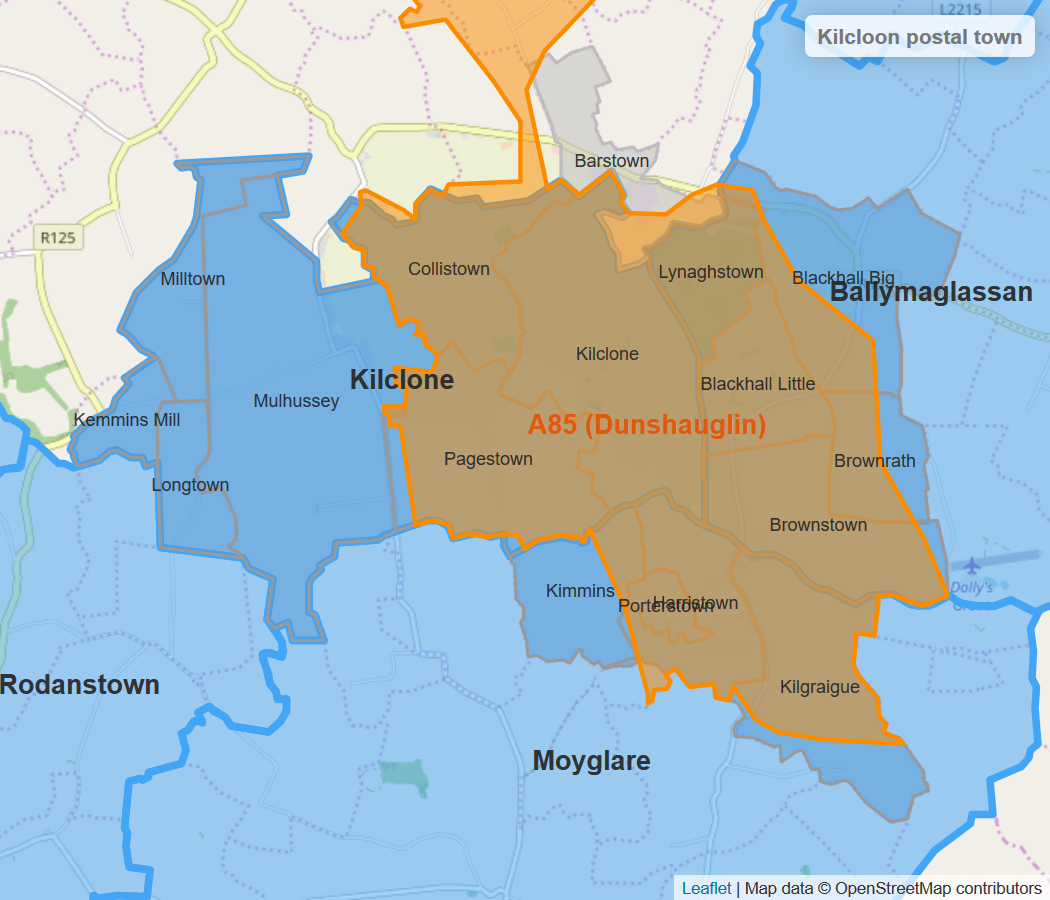
Kilcloon townlands that use the Kilcloon postal town

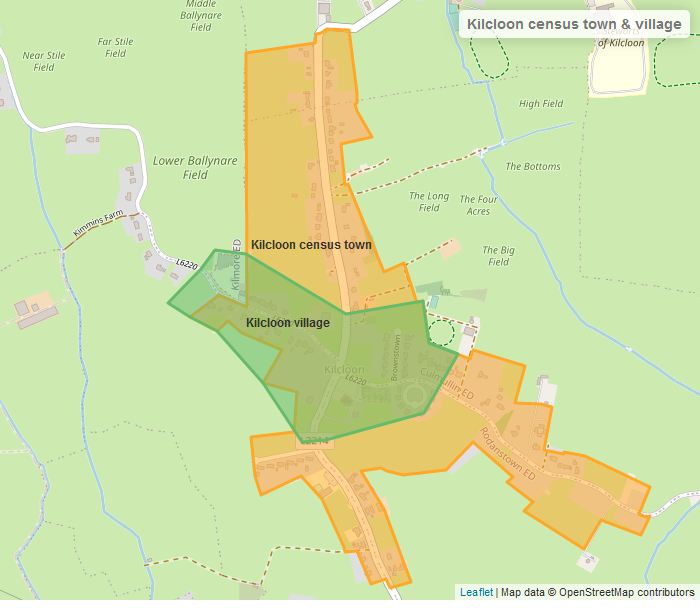
Kilcloon census town and village

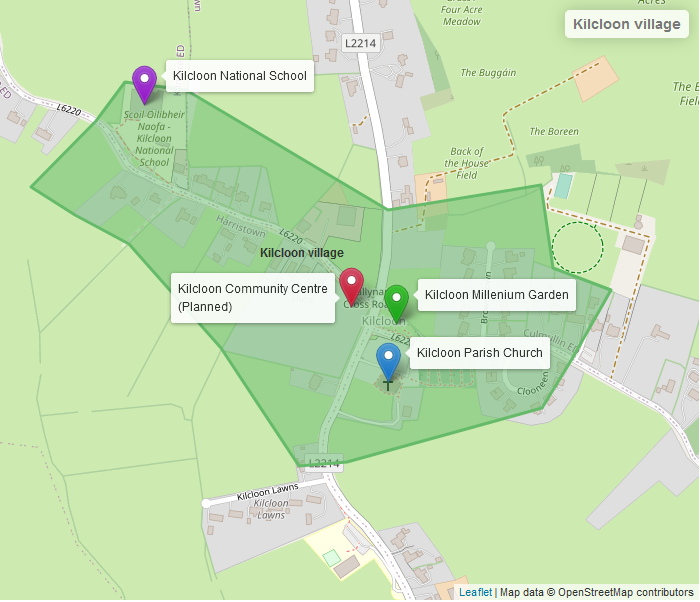
Kilcloon village in detail

== History ==
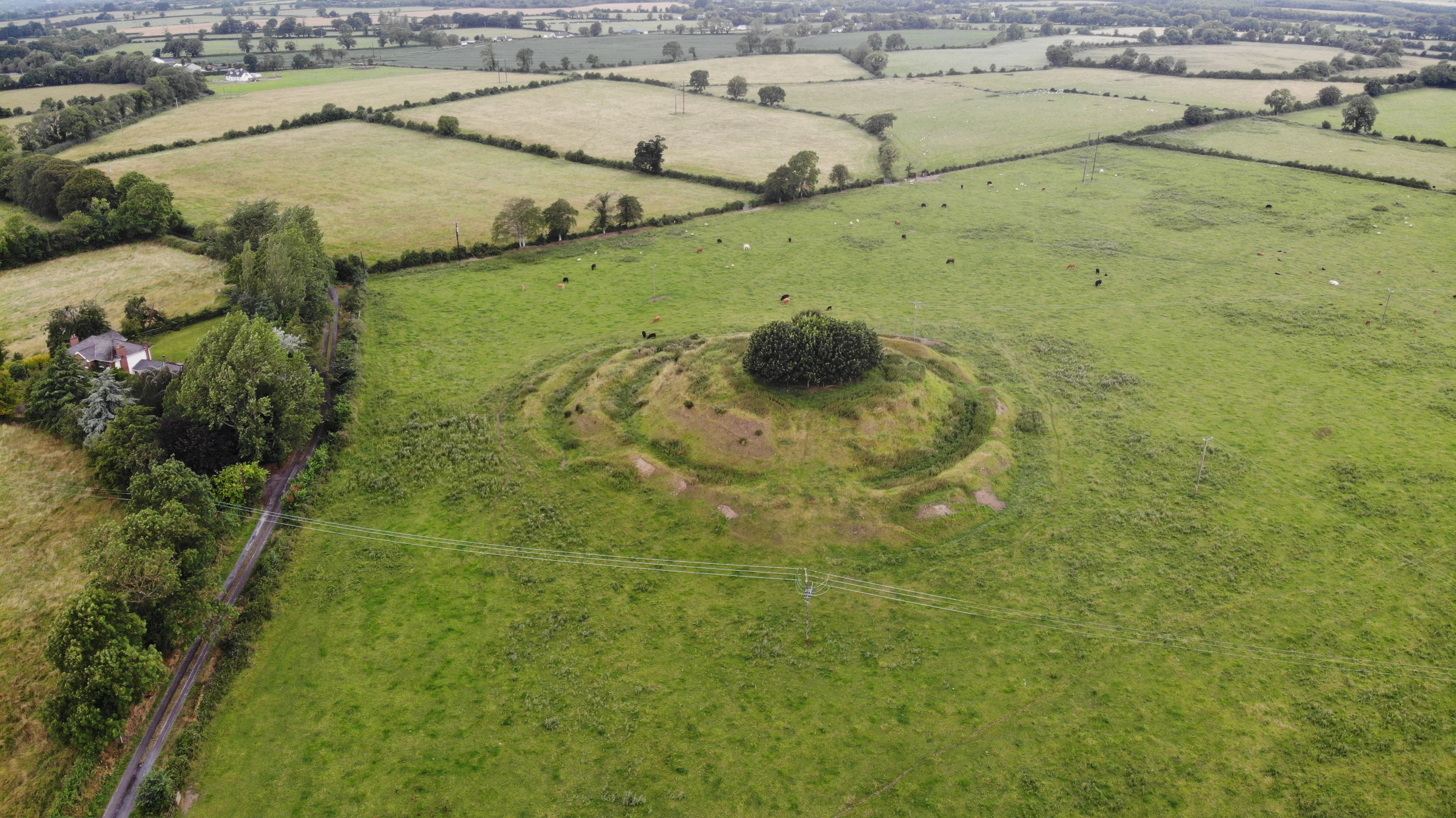
Ringfort in Rodanstown townland

For nearly 700 years before the arrival of the Normans in the 12th century the area was occupied by Christian farmers. Very little trace of their lives remains but it was an agricultural society and the remains of ring forts of strong farmers can still be seen dotted around the countryside.

The Normans under Hugh de Lacy brought about revolutionary changes in the old Gaelic way of life. de Lacy created several baronies in the Kingdom of Meath. The barons in turn established manors and their associated parishes over the course of the following 400 years. Each manor was in turn divided into a number of townlands. The manors of Kilclone (Mulhussey), Balfeighan and Rodanstown were part of the Barony of Deece ruled by the Husseys of Galtrim, whereas the manors of Ballymaglassan and Rathregan were part of the Barony of Ratoath, the personal fiefdom of de Lacy himself. Moyglare was also part of the Barony of Deece but took on a separate identity when Hugh de Hussey handed it back to de Lacy who then gave it to Hugh Tyrell.

The parishes were usually of the same size and boundaries as the manors. Priests and churches were financed by tithes. Control of the parish churches and the income from tithes was given over to the monasteries.

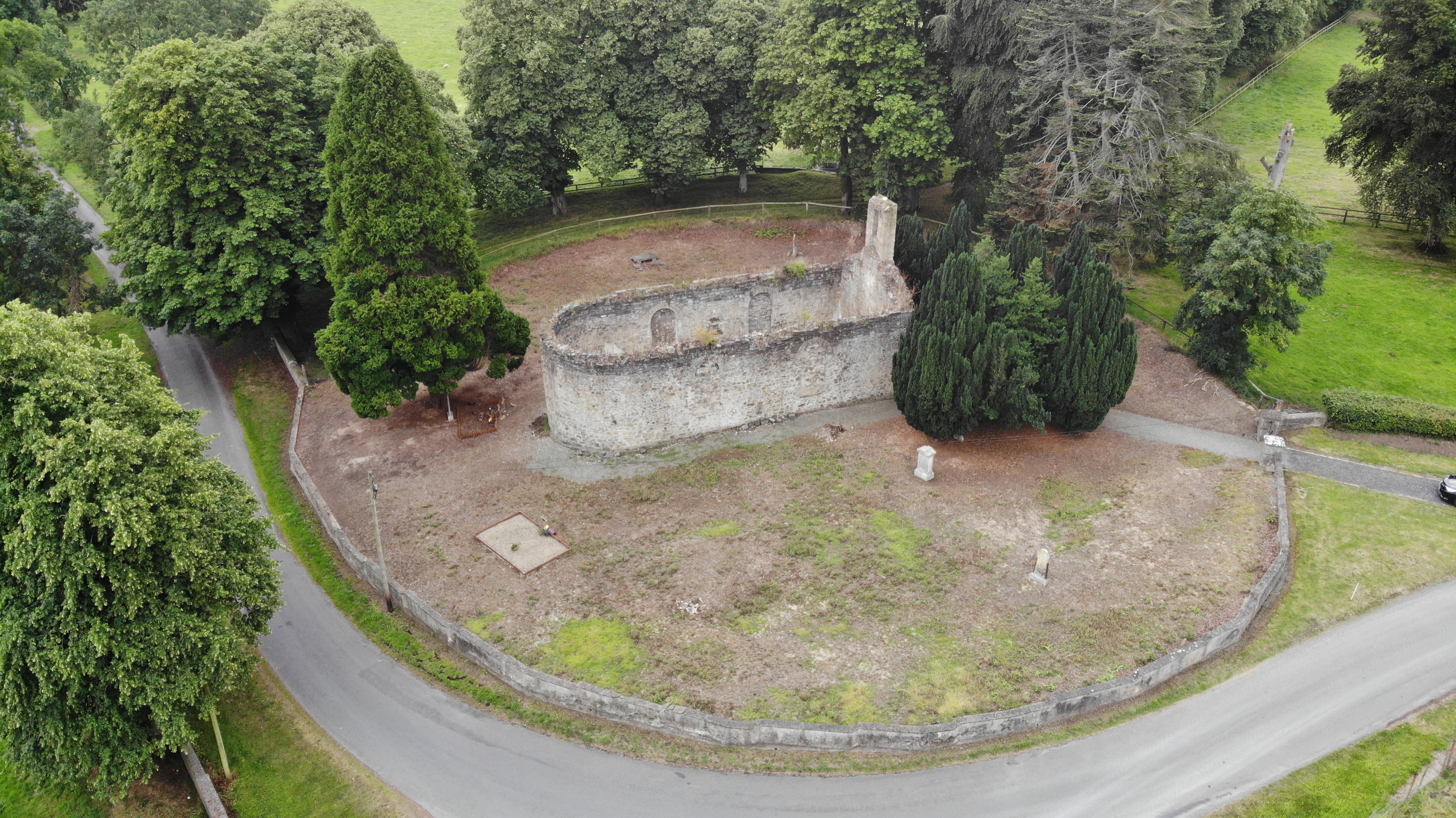
Ruins of Rodanstown chapel

The system of baronies, manors and parishes persisted until the political and religious turmoil in England caused by the Reformation, civil wars and the introduction of the Penal Laws in the 16th and 17th centuries. These events resulted in the confiscation of lands from the barons and the suppression of the Catholic Church. By the 18th century the Husseys had mostly disappeared from the parish and only two manors survived intact: Moyglare and Rathregan. Ballymaglassan never became a manorial centre, but was owned by various lords whose manorial centres were elsewhere. The churches had fallen into ruins.

After the failure of the Reformation in Ireland, the new parish of Kilcloon was created in 1704 as a union of the six medieval parishes and a new "popish priest" was registered.

The remains of many of the medieval parish churches and tower houses from the Middle Ages can be found in the parish.

== Amenities ==
The parish contains the parish church (Church of St. Oliver Plunkett, Kilcloon) and chapels (Church of the Assumption, Batterstown and Church of the Assumption, Kilcock). The patron of the parish church is Oliver Plunkett, bishop and martyr, and was the first church dedicated to his memory. A sculpture of Oliver Plunkett is featured in the Kilcloon Millennium Garden.

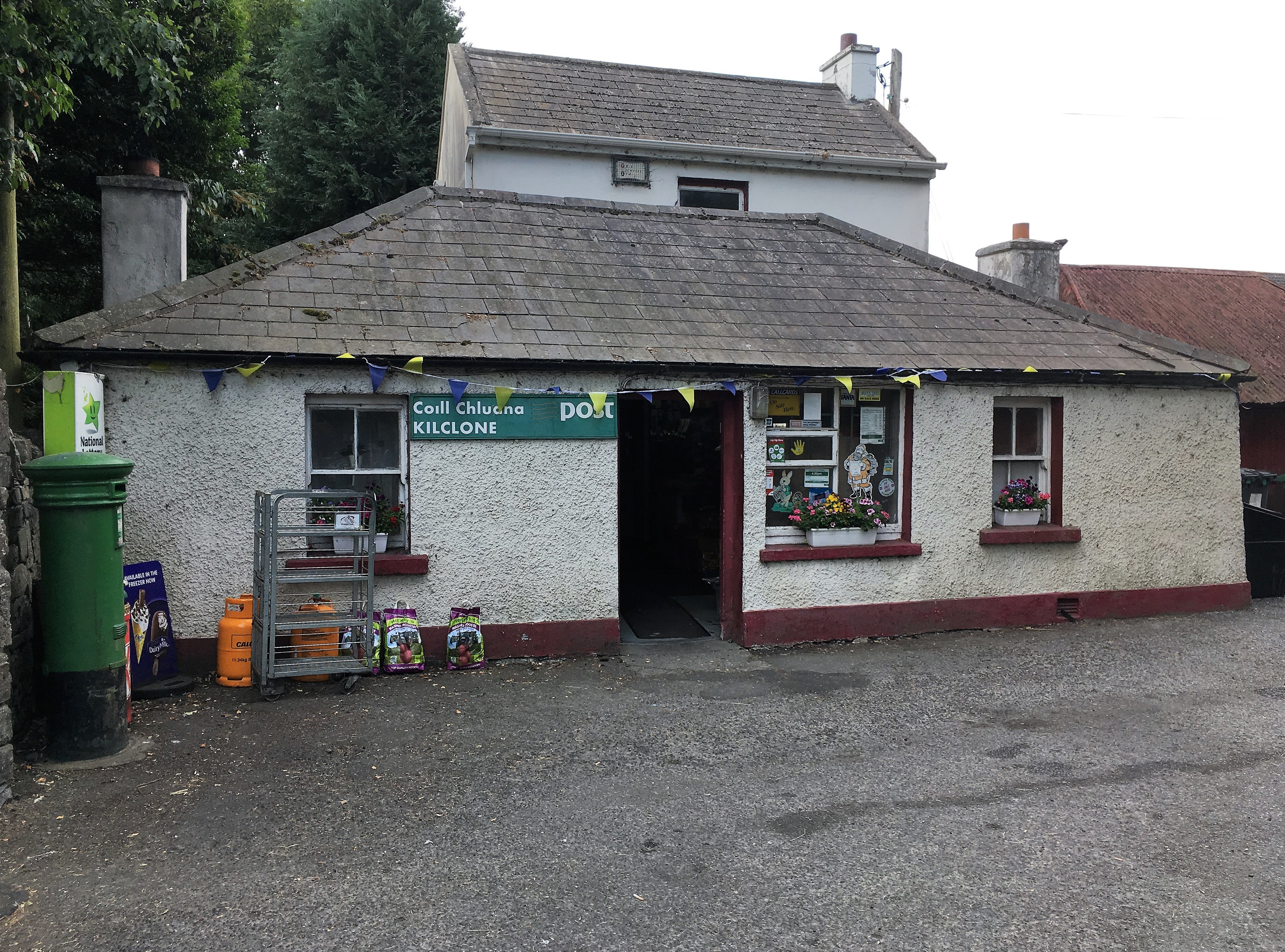
Kilclone Post Office

There are three national schools in the parish: Kilcloon, Mulhussey and Rathregan (Batterstown).

A post office is located near Kilcloon village (Kilclone Post Office).

A credit union was established in Kilcloon Parish in 1972. The head office is located in Kilcock with a sub-office in Batterstown.

In 2018, Meath County Council granted permission for a 426 square metre community centre, on a site in the centre of the village of Kilcloon along with permission for the development of 13 sites for people who meet local needs criteria.

The parish is home to the Blackhall Gaels football, hurling and camogie club. The club's main grounds are in Batterstown with a second GAA pitch at Collistown. The Collistown grounds are named after Cyril O'Brien, Jack Fitzgerald and John Kelly.

The 11th Meath Kilcloon Scouts meet at Kilcloon National School.

== People ==
- Lisa Hannigan, singer/songwriter, grew up in Kilcloon.
- Gavin Jennings, broadcaster, grew up in Kilcloon.
- William Conolly (1662-1729), politician, Commissioner of Revenue, lawyer and landowner, had his country residence at Rodanstown until he purchased Castletown in 1709.

== Gallery ==
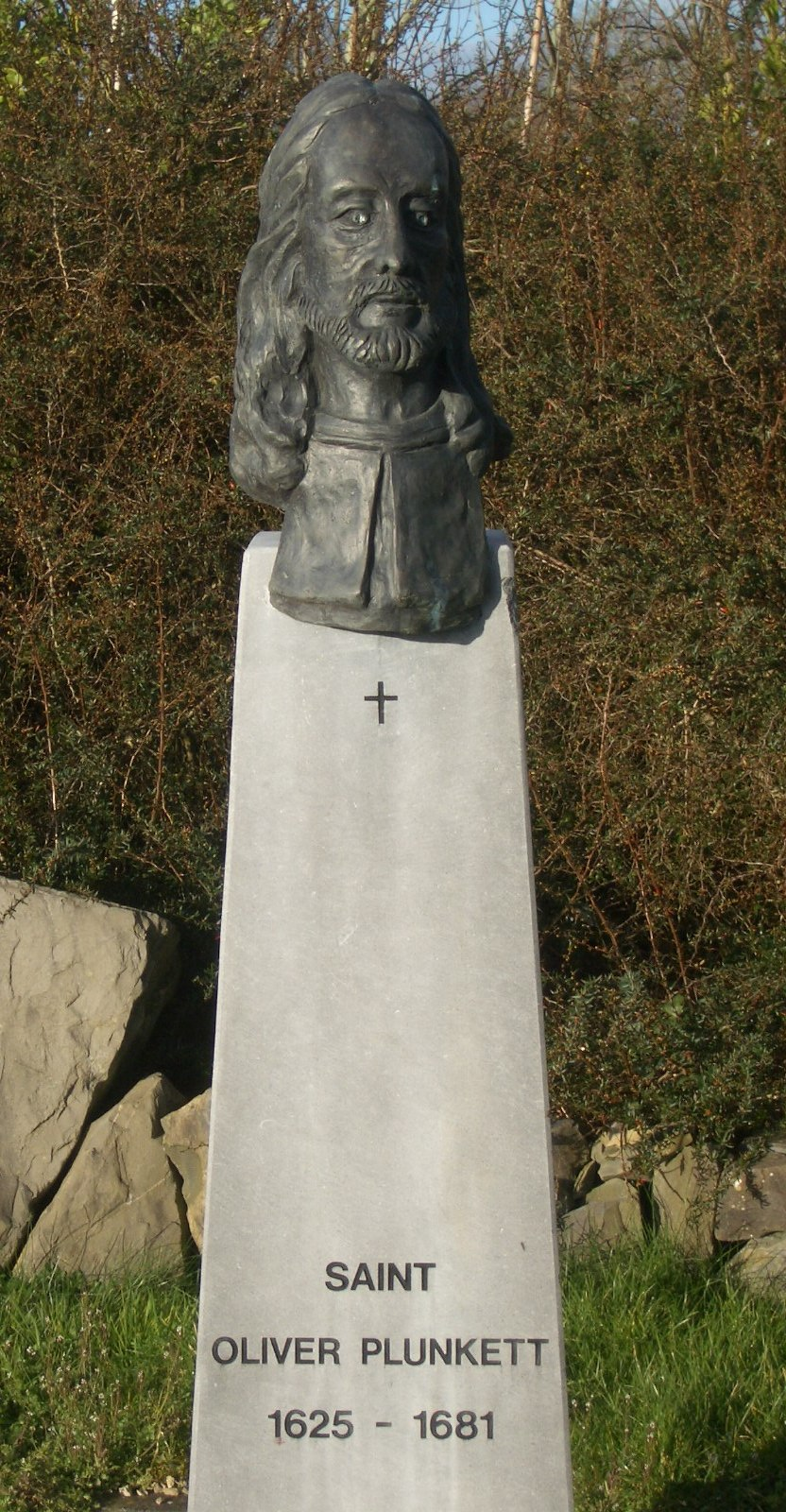
Bust of Oliver Plunkett in the Kilcloon Millennium Garden

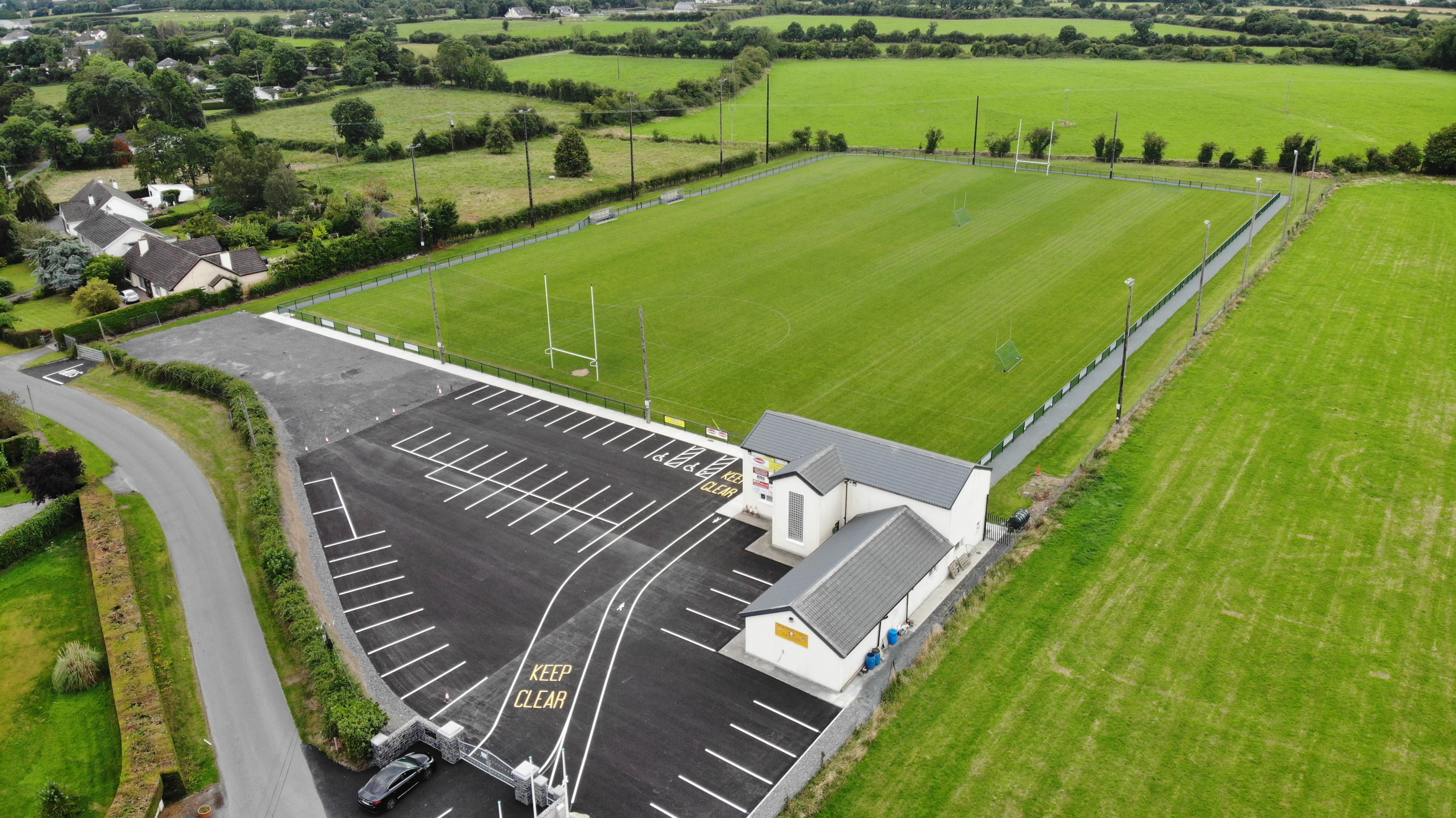
Fitzgerald Kelly O'Brien Park

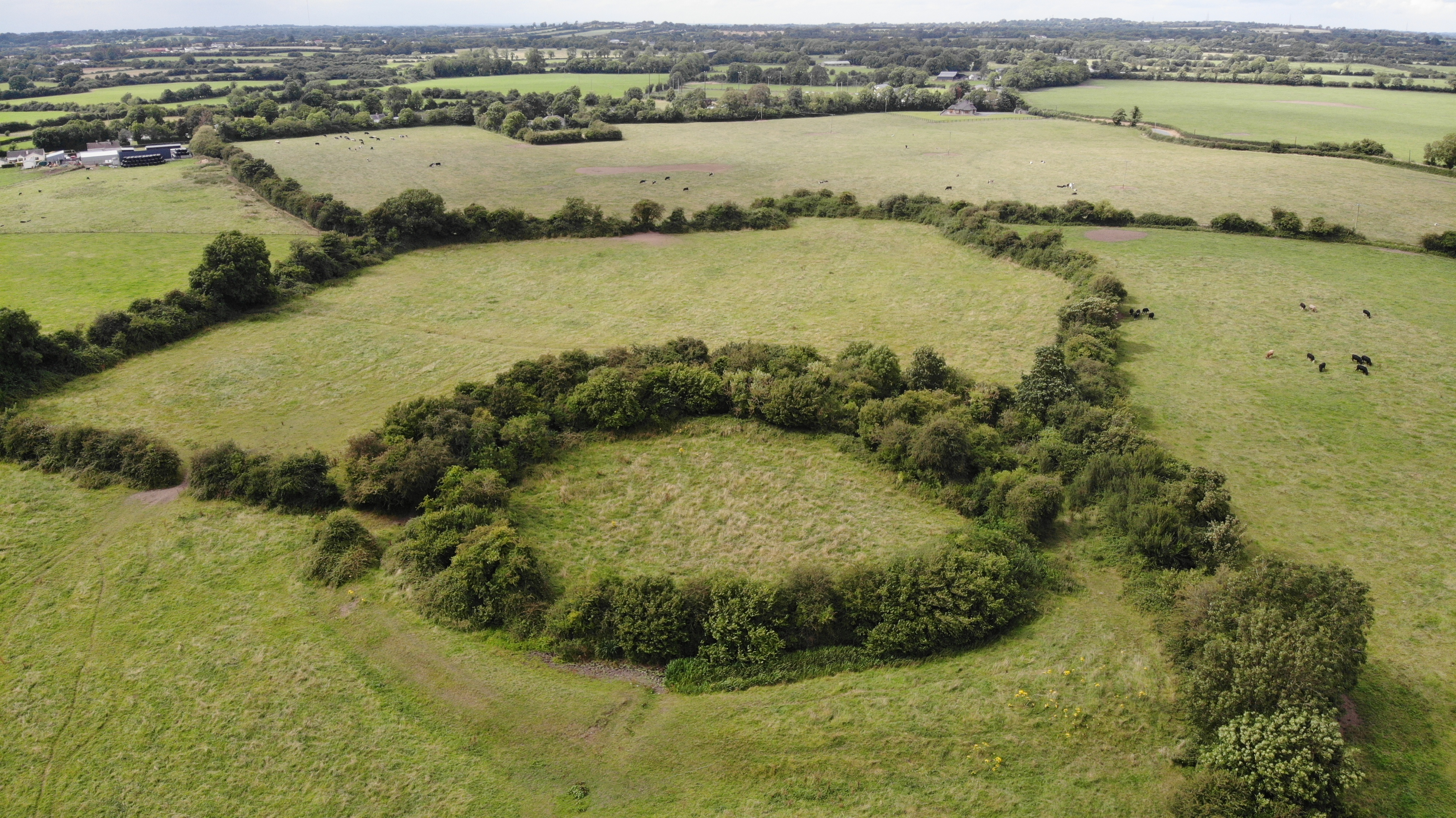
A ringfort in Kilclone townland

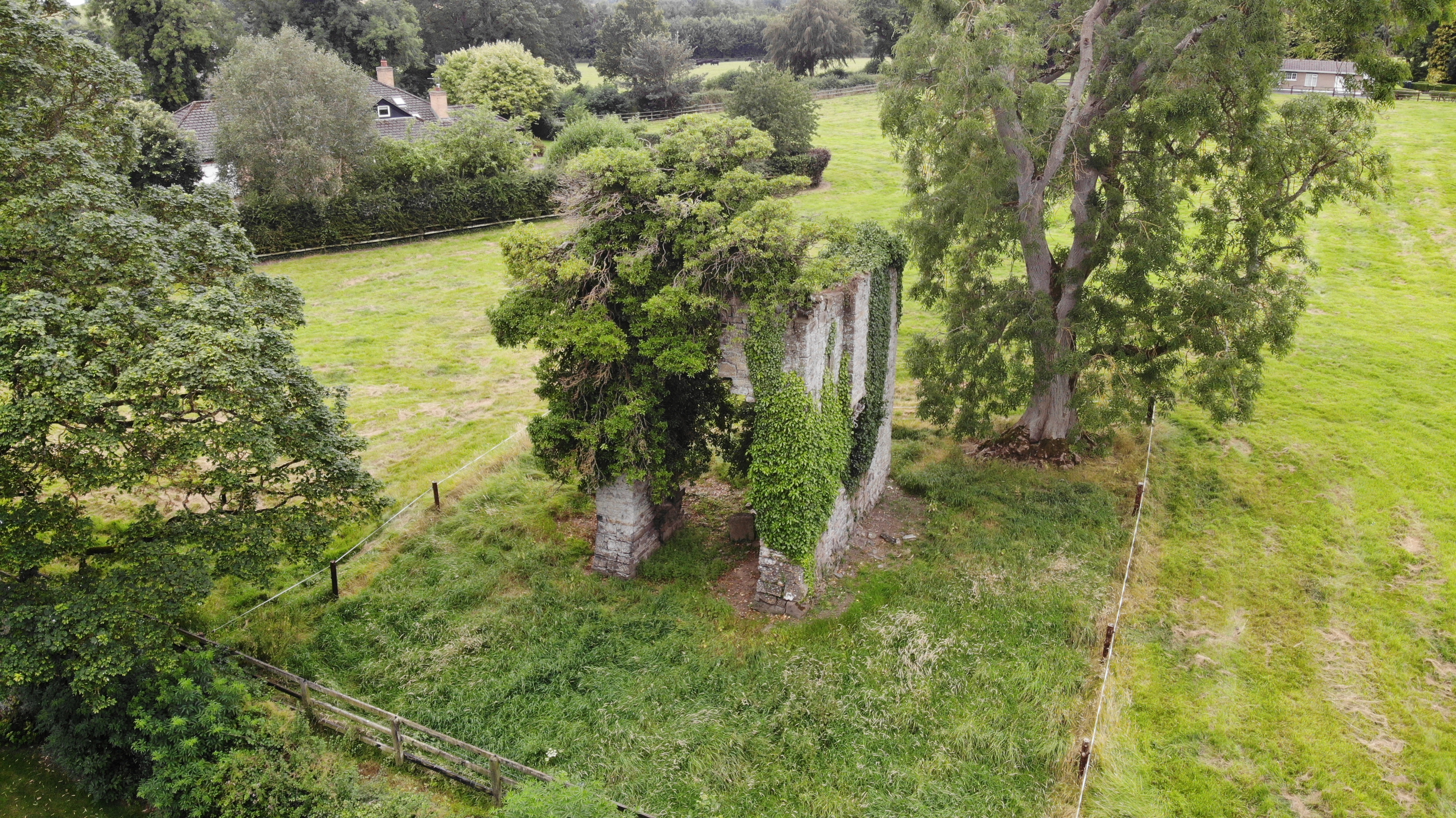
Ruins of Moyglare gateway
