= Cortown GAA =

Gaelic sports club in County Meath, Ireland

Cortown
- Baile Corr
- Founded: 1969
- County: Meath
- Colours
- Grounds: Páirc Naomh Baoithin

Playing kits
Standard colours

Senior Club Championships
	All Ireland	Leinster champions	Meath champions
Football:	0	0	0

Cortown GAA is a Gaelic Athletic Association club in Cortown, County Meath, Ireland. The club is affiliated to the Meath County Board and fields teams primarily in Gaelic football.

== History ==
Located in the village of Cortown, approximately 7km from Bohermeen, Cortown GAA was founded in 1969. Their pitch, Páirc Naomh Baoithin, opened in 1981.

Cortown won the Meath IFC in 1996, defeating Duleek by a scoreline of 2-05 to 0-08. Cortown also played St Ultan's in the Meath IFC final in 2008, though were defeated by 3 points. After winning the Meath IFC in 1996, they spent 9 years at the senior level, getting relegated in the 2006 championship.

Cortown have won 2 Meath JFC titles, each in 1993 and 2014. They defeated St Peter's Dunboyne B in both of those finals. They also played in 2 finals in 1987 and 1990, losing to Moynalty and Simonstown Gaels respectively.

As of 2026, Cortown compete in the Meath JBFC.

== Honours ==
- Meath Intermediate Football Championship (1): 1996 (runners-up in 2008)
- Meath Junior 'A' Football Championship (2): 1993, 2014 (runners-up in 1987, 1990)

Preceded by Simonstown Gaels	Meath Intermediate Football Champions; 1996	Succeeded by Dunshaughlin
