= Batterstown =

Small rural village in the townland of Rathregan, County Meath, Ireland

Batterstown Baile an Bhóthair
- Village
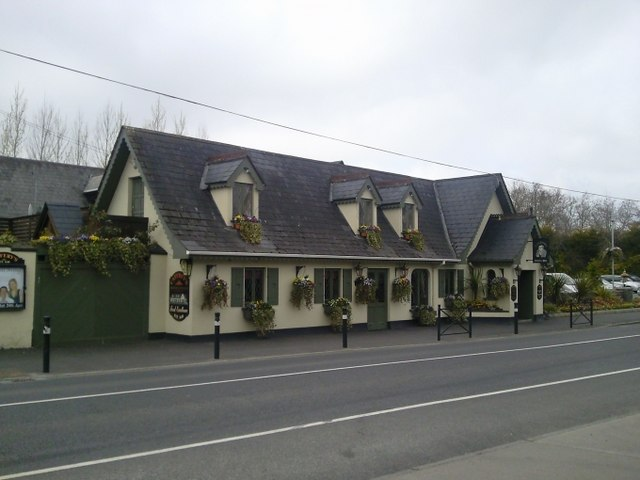
- Pub in Batterstown

- Location in Ireland
- Coordinates: 53°28′11″N 6°32′11″W
- Country: Ireland
- Province: Leinster
- County: County Meath
- Time zone: UTC+0 (WET)
  - Summer (DST): UTC-1 (IST (WEST))

Batterstown (Irish: Baile an Bhóthair, meaning 'town of the road') is a small rural village in the townland of Rathregan (Ráth Riagáin), County Meath, Ireland. It is about 23 km (14 mi) northwest of Dublin, on the R154 regional road. It hosts a yearly cycling race.

== Facilities ==
A primary school (Rathregan National School) is in Batterstown. The post office was closed in 2018.

== Sport ==
The local Batterstown Gaelic Athletic Association club is Blackhall Gaels GAA. Batterstown holds the club's main training ground. The club fields Gaelic football, Ladies' Gaelic football, hurling and camogie teams.

== Transport ==
Batterstown railway station on the Dublin–Navan railway line opened on 1 July 1863, was closed for passenger traffic on 27 January 1947, closed for goods traffic on 12 June 1961, and finally closed altogether on 1 April 1963. The village is served by the Bus Éireann 111 Athboy to Dublin service. Under the Bus Éireann M3 Corridor - Bus Services to Dublin & Local Centres Proposals announced in 2015, this route has enhanced services with hourly service off peak and more frequent during the morning rush hours.

== See also ==
- List of towns and villages in Ireland
- Kilcloon
- Mulhussey
