= 2003 Meath Senior Football Championship =

Meath S.F.C.
- Season: 2003
- Champions: Blackhall Gaels; 1st Senior Football Championship title
- Relegated: Ballivor
- Leinster SCFC: Blackhall Gaels (Quarter-final) Clonguish 1-9, Blackhall Gaels 1-5
- All Ireland SCFC: N/A
- Winning Captain: Steven Nally (Blackhall Gaels)
- Man of the Match: Anthony Moyles (Blackhall Gaels)

The 2003 Meath Senior Football Championship was the 111th edition of the Meath GAA's premier club Gaelic football tournament for senior graded teams in County Meath, Ireland, and also the 50th anniversary of the first use of the Keegan Cup, won by Navan O'Mahonys first in 1954. The tournament consists of 16 teams, with the winner going on to represent Meath in the Leinster Senior Club Football Championship. The championship starts with a group stage and then progresses to a knock out stage.

Dunshaughlin were the defending champions after they defeated Trim in the previous years final, but their quest to claim 4 S.F.C. titles in succession was thwarted by Blackhall Gaels in the semi-final.

This was Ballivor's first season in the top grade since 1986 after claiming the 2002 Meath Intermediate Football Championship title, their second Intermediate win, but were relegated later on in the year, spending only 1 year as a senior club.

On 21 September 2003, Blackhall Gaels claimed their 12th Senior Championship title when they defeated Simonstown Gaels 2-9 to 1-9. Steven Nally lifted the Keegan Cup for the Batterstown/Kilcloon combination while Anthony Moyles claimed the 'Man of the Match' award.

== Team changes ==
The following teams have changed division since the 2002 championship season.

=== To S.F.C. ===
Promoted from I.F.C.

- Ballivor - (Intermediate Champions)

=== From S.F.C. ===
Relegated to I.F.C.

- Oldcastle

== Participating teams ==
The teams competing in the 2003 Meath Senior Championship are:

Club	Location	2002 Championship Position	2003 Championship Position
Ballinlough	Ballinlough & Kilskyre	Non Qualifier	Non Qualifier
Ballivor	Ballivor	I.F.C Champions	Relegated to I.F.C
Blackhall Gaels	Batterstown & Kilcloon	Quarter-Finalist	Champions
Cortown	Cortown	Relegation Semi-Finalist	Non Qualifier
Dunderry	Dunderry & Robinstown	Relegation Semi-Finalist	Quarter-Finalist
Dunshaughlin	Dunshaughlin & Drumree	Champions	Semi-Finalist
Gaeil Colmcille	Kells	Non Qualifier	Non Qualifier
Kilmainhamwood	Kilmainhamwood	Preliminary Relegation Play Off	Relegation Play Off
Seneschalstown	Kentstown & Yellow Furze	Semi-Finalist	Non Qualifier
Simonstown Gaels	Navan	Quarter-Finalist	Finalist
Skryne	Skryne & Tara	Quarter-Finalist	Quarter-Finalist
St. Patrick's	Stamullen & Julianstown	Non Qualifier	Quarter-Finalist
St. Peter's Dunboyne	Dunboyne	Semi-Finalist	Non Qualifier
Summerhill	Summerhill	Relegation Finalist	Non Qualifier
Trim	Trim	Finalist	Semi-Finalist
Walterstown	Navan	Quarter-Finalist	Quarter-Finalist

== Group stage ==
There are 2 groups called Group A and B. The 4 top finishers in Group A and B will qualify for the quarter finals. The 2 teams that finish last in their groups will play in a relegation play off.

=== Group A ===
Team	Pld	W	L	D	PF	PA	PD	Pts
Trim	7	6	1	0	97	79	+18	12
Walterstown	7	5	2	0	89	78	+11	10
St. Patrick's	7	4	2	1	103	89	+14	9
Dunshaughlin	7	3	2	2	98	79	+19	8
St Peters Dunboyne	7	4	3	0	94	90	+4	8
Summerhill	7	2	5	0	83	98	-15	6
Cortown	7	1	5	1	71	100	-29	3
Kilmainhamwood	7	1	6	0	80	97	-17	2

Round 1:

- St. Patrick's 1-12, 2-6 Trim, Skryne,
- Dunshaughlin 2-12, 0-11 Summerhill, Dunsany,
- Walterstown 1-12, 0-9 Cortown, Pairc Tailteann,
- St. Peter's Dunboyne 1-12, 1-11 Kilmainhamwood, Pairc Tailteann,

Round 2:

- Trim 1-15, 1-10 Summerhill, Pairc Tailteann,
- Kilmainhamwood 2-6, 0-6 St. Patrick's, Rathkenny,
- Walterstown 0-10, 1-5 Dunshaughlin,
- St. Peter's Dunboyne 2-10, 0-7 Cortown, Pairc Tailteann,

Round 3:

- Trim 1-11, 0-12 Kilmainhamwood,
- St. Patrick's 4-13, 1-10 Cortown, Walterstown,
- Dunshaughlin 1-12, 1-8 St. Peter's Dunboyne,
- Walterstown 0-11, 0-9 Summerhill, Trim,

Round 4:

- Trim 0-11, 0-6 Cortown, Kildalkey,
- Dunshaughlin 1-8, 3-2 St. Patrick's Duleek,
- Summerhill 2-7, 0-11 Kilmainhamwood, Moynalty,
- St. Peter's Dunboyne 0-14, 0-11 Walterstown,

Round 5:

- Walterstown 2-15, 2-8 St. Patrick's, Skryne,
- Trim 1-12, 1-8 Dunshaughlin,
- Cortown 1-10, 0-10 Kilmainhamwood, Moynalty,
- St. Peter's Dunboyne 2-10, 2-3 Summerhill, Dunsany,

Round 6:

- Trim 1-11, 1-7 Walterstown,
- St. Patrick's 3-12, 1-7 St. Peter's Dunboyne, Donaghmore,
- Dunshaughlin 4-13, 1-8 Kilmainhamwood, Simonstown,
- Summerhill 2-12, 1-10 Cortown,

Round 7:

- Trim 1-10, 0-12 St. Peter's Dunboyne,
- St. Patrick's 0-11, 0-10 Summerhill, Dunsany,
- Dunshaughlin 1-7, 0-10 Cortown, Pairc Tailteann,
- Walterstown 1-8, 1-7 Kilmainhamwood, Kells,

=== Group B ===
Team	Pld	W	L	D	PF	PA	PD	Pts
Skryne	7	7	0	0	109	75	+34	14
Blackhall Gaels	7	6	1	0	113	55	+58	12
Simonstown Gaels	7	4	3	0	94	74	+20	8
Dunderry	7	4	3	0	88	85	+3	8
Seneschalstown	7	3	4	0	91	95	-4	6
Ballinlough	7	1	5	1	64	90	-26	3
Gaeil Colmcille	7	1	5	1	60	110	-50	3
Ballivor	7	1	6	0	68	103	-35	2

Round 1:

- Blackhall Gaels 1-9, 1-8 Simonstown Gaels, Skryne,
- Skryne 1-13, 0-13 Ballinlough,
- Dunderry 1-14, 2-3 Ballivor, Athboy,
- Seneschalstown 2-10, 0-12 Gaeil Colmcille, Walterstown,

Round 2:

- Blackhall Gaels 2-11, 2-2 Seneschalstown, Dunsany,
- Simonstown Gaels 3-10, 1-4 Ballivor, Trim,
- Skryne 1-13, 0-6 Gaeil Colmcille,
- Dunderry 1-12, 0-4 Ballinlough, Athboy,

Round 3:

- Skryne 1-14, 1-8 Blackhall Gaels, Pairc Tailteann,
- Seneschalstown 1-14, 0-7 Simonstown Gaels, Pairc Tailteann,
- Dunderry 1-10, 0-10 Gaeil Colmcille, Athboy,
- Ballinlough 1-12, 1-6 Ballivor,

Round 4:

- Blackhall Gaels 2-10, 0-4 Dunderry,
- Simonstown Gaels 0-11, 1-5 Ballinlough,
- Gaeil Colmcille 1-9, 0-6 Ballivor,
- Skryne 0-13, 0-11 Seneschalstown, Pairc Tailteann,

Round 5:

- Blackhall Gaels 0-8, 0-7 Ballivor,
- Skryne 0-16, 0-11 Simonstown Gaels,
- Gaeil Colmcille 0-11, 1-8 Ballinlough,
- Dunderry 3-11, 1-9 Seneschalstown, Pairc Tailteann,

Round 6:

- Blackhall Gaels 1-15, 0-6 Ballinlough, Trim,
- Simonstown Gaels 2-11, 0-7 Gaeil Colmcille, Martry,
- Skryne 2-10, 1-9 Dunderry, Pairc Tailteann,
- Ballivor 4-7 2-11 Seneschalstown, Dunsany,

Round 7:

- Blackhall Gaels 3-22, 0-2 Gaeil Colmcille, Pairc Tailteann,
- Simonstown Gaels 2-12, 0-7 Dunderry, Pairc Tailteann,
- Skryne 1-12, 1-8 Ballivor,
- Seneschalstown 0-10, 0-7 Ballinlough, Martry,

== Knock-out Stage ==
=== Relegation final ===
- Kilmainhamwood 1-8, 0-8 Ballivor, Kells, 6/9/2003,

=== Finals ===
Quarter-finals
Trim	0-14
Dunderry	0-8
Walterstown	0-11
Simonstown Gaels	1-11
Blackhall Gaels	4-7
St. Patrick's	1-8
Skryne	1-12
Dunshaughlin	3-8

Semi-finals
Trim	0-8
Simonstown Gaels	1-9
Blackhall Gaels	3-9
Dunshaughlin	1-14

Final
Blackhall Gaels	2-9
Simonstown Gaels	1-9

Quarter-final:

- Blackhall Gaels 0-9, 0-9 St. Patrick's, Skryne, 22/8/2003,
- Dunshaughlin 3-8, 1-12 Skryne, Pairc Tailteann, 22/8/2003,
- Trim 0-14, 0-8 Dunderry, Pairc Tailteann, 24/8/2003,
- Simonstown Gaels 1-11, 0-11 Walterstown, Pairc Tailteann, 24/8/2003,

Quarter-final Replay:

- Blackhall Gaels 4-7, 1-8 St. Patrick's, Skryne, 31/8/2003,

Semi-final:

- Blackhall Gaels 3-9, 1-12 Dunshaughlin, Pairc Tailteann, 7/9/2003,
- Simonstown Gaels 1-9, 0-8 Trim, Pairc Tailteann, 7/9/2003,

Final:

- Blackhall Gaels 1-9, 0-7 Simonstown Gaels, Pairc Tailteann, 21/9/2003,
