= 2002 Meath Senior Football Championship =

Meath S.F.C.
- Season: 2002
- Champions: Dunshaughlin; 3rd Senior Football Championship title
- Relegated: Oldcastle
- Leinster SCFC: Dunshaughlin (champions) Portlaoise 0-13, Mattock Rangers 0-7
- All Ireland SCFC: Dunshaughlin (semi-final) Crossmolina Deel Rovers 3-10, Dunshaughlin 1-12
- Winning Captain: Kenny McTigue (Dunshaughlin)
- Man of the Match: David Crimmins (Dunshaughlin)

The 2002 Meath Senior Football Championship was the 110th edition of the Meath GAA's premier club Gaelic football tournament for senior graded teams in County Meath, Ireland. The tournament consists of 16 teams, with the winner going on to represent Meath in the Leinster Senior Club Football Championship. The championship starts with a group stage and then progresses to a knock out stage.

Dunshaughlin were the defending champions after they defeated Skryne in the previous years final, and in October 2002, they successfully defended their title with a 1–11 to 2–6 win over Trim to claim their 3rd Senior Championship title in a row and 3rd in all. Kenny McTigue raised the Keegan Cup while David Crimmins scooped the 'Man of the Match' award.

Blackhall Gaels were promoted after claiming the 2001 Meath Intermediate Football Championship title, their second Intermediate win.

Oldcastle were relegated after 15 years in the senior grade.

On 22 December 2002, Dunshaughlin claimed their first Leinster SCFC title by defeating Mattock Rangers of Louth 0–13 to 0–7.

== Team changes ==
The following teams have changed division since the 2001 championship season.

=== To S.F.C. ===
Promoted from I.F.C.

- Blackhall Gaels - (Intermediate Champions)

=== From S.F.C. ===
Relegated to I.F.C.

- Navan O'Mahonys
- Syddan

== Participating teams ==
The teams competing in the 2002 Meath Senior Championship are:

Club	Location	2001 Championship Position	2002 Championship Position
Ballinlough	Ballinlough & Kilskyre	Relegation Finalist	Non Qualifier
Blackhall Gaels	Batterstown & Kilcloon	I.F.C Champions	Quarter-Finalist
Cortown	Cortown	Quarter-Finalist	Relegation Semi-Finalist
Dunderry	Dunderry & Robinstown	Semi-Finalist	Relegation Semi-Finalist
Dunshaughlin	Dunshaughlin & Drumree	Champions	Champions
Gaeil Colmcille	Kells	Non Qualifier	Non Qualifier
Kilmainhamwood	Kilmainhamwood	Quarter-Finalist	Preliminary Relegation Play Off
Oldcastle	Oldcastle	Quarter-Finalist	Relegated to I.F.C
Seneschalstown	Kentstown & Yellow Furze	Non Qualifier	Semi-Finalist
Simonstown Gaels	Navan	Non Qualifier	Quarter-Finalist
Skryne	Skryne & Tara	Finalist	Quarter-Finalist
St. Patrick's	Stamullen & Julianstown	Non Qualifier	Non Qualifier
St. Peter's Dunboyne	Dunboyne	Non Qualifier	Semi-Finalist
Summerhill	Summerhill	Relegation Finalist	Relegation Finalist
Trim	Trim	Quarter-Finalist	Finalist
Walterstown	Navan	Semi-Finalist	Quarter-Finalist

== Group stage ==
There are 4 groups called Group A, B, C and D. The 2 top finishers in each Group will qualify for the quarter finals. The team that finish last in their groups will play in a relegation play off. In the event of two teams being level on points and only one qualification spot available, a playoff will be played to determine final placings.

=== Group A ===
Team	Pld	W	L	D	PF	PA	PD	Pts
Simonstown Gaels	3	1	0	2	36	31	+5	4
Ballinlough	3	1	1	1	34	33	+1	3
Blackhall Gaels	3	1	1	1	29	33	-4	3
Dunderry	3	0	2	1	98	79	+19	1

Round 1:

- Blackhall Gaels 0-11, 1-7 Ballinlough, Simonstown,
- Simonstown Gaels 0–12, 1-9 Dunderry,

Round 2:

- Blackhall Gaels 0–11, 1-8 Dunderry, Dunsany,
- Simonstown Gaels 2–6, 1-9 Ballinlough,

Round 3:

- Simonstown Gaels 1-9, 0-7 Blackhall Gaels, Dunshaughlin,
- Ballinlough 0-12, 1-7 Dunderry,

Quarter-final playoff:

- Blackhall Gaels 1-10, 0-6 Ballinlough, Simonstown, 28/8/2002,

=== Group B ===
Team	Pld	W	L	D	PF	PA	PD	Pts
Trim	3	2	1	0	51	44	+7	4
Skryne	3	2	1	0	41	37	+4	4
Cortown	3	1	2	0	37	47	-10	2
Kilmainhamwood	3	1	2	0	36	47	-11	2

Round 1:

- Skryne 1-15, 0-7 Kilmainhamwood,
- Trim 1-13, 0-13 Cortown,

Round 2:

- Skryne 2-13, 2-5 Cortown,
- Kilmainhamwood 1-14, 2-10 Trim,

Round 3:

- Trim 2-13, 1-11 Skryne,
- Cortown 1-10, 1-9 Kilmainhamwood,

Preliminary Relegation Playoff:

- Kilmainhamwood 3-9, 0-6 Cortown,

=== Group C ===
Team	Pld	W	L	D	PF	PA	PD	Pts
Seneschalstown	3	2	0	1	46	25	+21	5
Walterstown	3	2	0	1	37	34	+3	5
St. Patrick's	3	1	2	0	38	45	-7	2
Oldcastle	3	0	3	0	24	41	-17	0

Round 1:

- Seneschalstown 3-3, 1-3 Oldcastle, Martry,
- Walterstown 2-8, 1-10 St. Patrick's,

Round 2:

- Seneschalstown 5-10, 0-10 St. Patrick's, Duleek,
- Walterstown 2-8, 0-12 Oldcastle,

Round 3:

- Seneschalstown 0–9, 0-9 Walterstown, Skryne,
- St. Patrick's 1-12, 0-6 Oldcastle,

=== Group D ===
Team	Pld	W	L	D	PF	PA	PD	Pts
Dunshaughlin	3	1	0	2	35	22	+13	4
St Peters Dunboyne	3	1	1	1	30	34	-4	3
Gaeil Colmcille	3	1	1	1	26	32	-6	3
Summerhill	3	1	2	0	39	42	-3	2

Round 1:

- Dunshaughlin 3-12, 0-8 Summerhill, Dunsany,
- Gaeil Colmcille 1-10, 0-8 St. Peter's Dunboyne, Pairc Tailteann,

Round 2:

- Dunshaughlin 0–8, 0-8 St. Peter's Dunboyne, Skryne,
- Summerhill 2-12, 1-4 Gaeil Colmcille,

Round 3:

- St. Peter's Dunboyne 2-8, 0-13 Summerhill,
- Dunshaughlin 0–6, 0-6 Gaeil Colmcille, Simonstown,

Quarter-final playoff:

- St. Peter's Dunboyne 1-17, 3-7 Gaeil Colmcille,

== Knock-out Stage ==
=== Relegation playoff ===
Relegation Semi-finals:

- Dunderry 2-9, 0-10 Oldcastle, Kells, 31/8/2002,
- Cortown 1-7, 0-9 Summerhill,

Relegation Final:

- Summerhill 1-6, 0-6 Oldcastle, Kells

=== Finals ===
Quarter-finals
Simonstown Gaels	0-10
St. Peter's Dunboyne	1-10
Walterstown	1-13
Trim	3-9
Dunshaughlin	3-7
Blackhall Gaels	1-10
Seneschalstown	1-10
Skryne	1-7

Semi-finals
St. Peter's Dunboyne	1-9
Trim	2-8
Dunshaughlin	0-10
Seneschalstown	1-4

Final
Trim	2-6
Dunshaughlin	1-11

Quarter-final:

- Seneschalstown 1-10, 0-17 Skryne, Pairc Tailteann, 30/8/2002,
- Trim 3-9, 1-13 Walterstown, Dunsany, 31/8/2002,
- Blackhall Gaels 2–10, 2-8 Dunshaughlin, Dunboyne, 1/9/2002,
- St. Peter's Dunboyne 1-10, 0-10 Simonstown Gaels, Skryne, 1/9/2002,

Quarter-final Replay:

- Dunshaughlin 3-7, 1-10 Blackhall Gaels, Pairc Tailteann, 13/10/2002, *

Semi-final:

- Trim 2-8, 1-9 St. Peter's Dunboyne, Pairc Tailteann, 27/10/2002,
- Dunshaughlin 0-10, 1-4 Seneschalstown, Pairc Tailteann, 27/10/2002,

Final:

- Dunshaughlin 1-11, 2-6 Trim, Pairc Tailteann, 10/11/2002,

In their quarter-final playoff tie with Ballinlough, Blackhall Gaels had Anthony Moyles sent off controversially with a straight red card. Just five days later, Moyles lined out in the Quarter-final against Dunshaughlin. He played despite being given a directive that he was ineligible to line out despite referee Dudley Farrell admitting that he sent the player off in the wrong.

After losing the tie, Dunshaughlin lodged a successful appeal and progressed to the Semi-finals at the expense of Blackhall. An objection to Leinster Council by the Kilcloon/Batterstown club was lost although the 24 weeks suspension, which was given to Meath county star Moyles, was lifted. When Blackhall Gaels club threatened to take their case to a higher court, the Meath County Board put a proposal to the two sides that the game be ’replayed.’ Both clubs sportingly agreed and the replay finally took place 42 days after the original fixture.

== Leinster Senior Club Football Championship ==
Quarter-final:

- Dunshaughlin 1-11, 0-2 Rathvilly,

Semi-final:

- Dunshaughlin 0–12, 1-9 Rathnew,

Semi-final Replay:

- Dunshaughlin 1-7, 0-4 Rathnew,

Final:

- Dunshaughlin 0-13, 1-7 Mattock Rangers,

== All-Ireland Senior Club Football Championship ==
Semi-final:

- Crossmolina Deel Rovers 3-10, 1-12 Dunshaughlin, Dr. Hyde Park, 23/2/2003,
