= 2001 Meath Senior Football Championship =

Meath S.F.C.
- Season: 2001
- Champions: Dunshaughlin; 2nd Senior Football Championship title
- Relegated: Navan O'Mahonys; Syddan
- Leinster SCFC: Dunshaughlin (Quarter-final 2nd Replay) Rathnew 2-9 Portlaoise 1-6,
- All Ireland SCFC: n/a
- Winning Captain: Ciaran Byrne (Dunshaughlin)
- Man of the Match: Martin Reilly (Dunshaughlin)

The 2001 Meath Senior Football Championship was the 109th edition of the Meath GAA's premier club Gaelic football tournament for senior graded teams in County Meath, Ireland. The tournament consists of 16 teams, with the winner going on to represent Meath in the Leinster Senior Club Football Championship. The championship starts with a group stage and then progresses to a knock out stage.

Dunshaughlin were the defending champions after they defeated Kilmainhamwood in the previous years final, and on 4 November 2001, they successfully defended their title with a 0–11 to 1–5 win over Skryne to claim their 2nd Senior Championship title in a row and 2nd in all. Ciaran Byrne lifted the Keegan Cup for Dunshaughlin while Martin Reilly claimed the 'Man of the Match' award.

St. Patrick's were promoted after claiming the 2000 Meath Intermediate Football Championship title, their third Intermediate win.

Navan O'Mahonys were relegated after 45 years in the senior grade. Only Skryne and Trim have operated at senior level for longer. Syddan were also relegated after 2 years as a senior club.

== Team changes ==
The following teams have changed division since the 2000 championship season.

=== To S.F.C. ===
Promoted from I.F.C.

- St. Patrick's - (Intermediate Champions)

=== From S.F.C. ===
Relegated to I.F.C.

- Moynalvey
- Blackhall Gaels

== Participating teams ==
The teams competing in the 2001 Meath Senior Championship are:

Club	Location	2000 Championship Position	2001 Championship Position
Ballinlough	Ballinlough & Kilskyre	Non-Qualifier	Relegation Finalist
Cortown	Cortown	Non-Qualifier	Quarter-Finalist
Dunderry	Dunderry & Robinstown	Quarter-Finalist	Semi-Finalist
Dunshaughlin	Dunshaughlin & Drumree	Champions	Champions
Gaeil Colmcille	Kells	Relegation Play Off	Non Qualifier
Kilmainhamwood	Kilmainhamwood	Finalist	Quarter-Finalist
Navan O'Mahonys	Navan	Relegation Play Off	Relegated to I.F.C
Oldcastle	Oldcastle	Non-Qualifier	Quarter-Finalist
Seneschalstown	Kentstown & Yellow Furze	Non-Qualifier	Non Qualifier
Simonstown Gaels	Navan	Quarter-Finalist	Non Qualifier
Skryne	Skryne & Tara	Semi-Finalist	Finalist
St. Peter's Dunboyne	Dunboyne	Non-Qualifier	Non Qualifier
St. Patrick's	Stamullen & Julianstown	I.F.C Champions	Non Qualifier
Summerhill	Summerhill	Quarter-Finalist	Relegation Finalist
Syddan	Lobinstown & Newtown	Quarter-Finalist	Relegated to I.F.C
Trim	Trim	Semi-Finalist	Quarter-Finalist
Walterstown	Navan	Non-Qualifier	Semi-Finalist

== Group stage ==
=== Group A ===
Team	Pld	W	L	D	PF	PA	PD	Pts
Walterstown	4	3	0	1	59	41	+18	7
Trim	4	2	3	0	47	60	-13	4
St. Patrick's	4	2	3	0	41	51	-10	4
Seneschalstown	4	2	3	0	54	48	+6	4
Summerhill	4	0	3	1	45	51	-6	1

Round 1:

- Seneschalstown 2-6, 0-9 Summerhill, Trim, 25/4/2001,
- Walterstown 2-11, 0-6 St. Patrick's, Duleek, 25/4/2001,
- Trim - Bye,

Round 2:

- Walterstown 3-5, 1-8 Trim, Dunsany, 9/5/2001,
- St. Patrick's 1-7, 0-9 Summerhill, Walterstown, 13/5/2001,
- Seneschalstown - Bye,

Round 3:

- Walterstown 0–15, 2-9 Summerhill, Dunsany, 10/6/2001,
- Trim 2-11, 1-13 Seneschalstown, Kilmessan, 10/6/2001,
- St. Patrick's - Bye,

Round 4:

- Walterstown 0-13, 1-6 Seneschalstown, Pairc Tailteann, 29/6/2001,
- St. Patrick's 0-16, 0-5 Trim, Dunsany, 30/6/2001,
- Summerhill - Bye,

Round 5:

- Seneschalstown 1-14, 0-9 St. Patrick's, Donore, 21/7/2001,
- Trim 0-14, 1-9 Summerhill, Longwood, 21/7/2001,
- Walterstown - Bye,

Quarter-final Playoff:

- Game 1: St. Patrick's 3-8, 2-10 Seneschalstown, Donore, 14/8/2011,
- Game 2: Trim 1-15, 2-9 St. Patrick's, Dunsany, 30/9/2001,

=== Group B ===
Team	Pld	W	L	D	PF	PA	PD	Pts
Dunshaughlin	3	2	1	0	40	35	+5	4
Kilmainhamwood	3	2	1	0	36	40	-4	4
Simonstown Gaels	3	1	2	0	34	34	+0	2
Ballinlough	3	1	2	0	39	40	-1	2

Round 1:

- Kilmainhamwood 1-5, 0-6 Simonstown Gaels, Kells, 22/4/2001,
- Dunshaughlin 0-12, 0-7 Ballinlough, Pairc Tailteann, 27/4/2001,

Round 2:

- Simonstown Gaels 1-13, 1-6 Dunshaughlin, Dunsany, 11/5/2001,
- Kilmainhamwood 3-7, 1-12 Ballinlough, Kells, 13/5/2001,

Round 3:

- Dunshaughlin 2-13, 1-9 Kilmainhamwood, Pairc Tailteann, 9/6/2001,
- Ballinlough 1-14, 0-12 Simonstown Gaels, Kells, 9/6/2001,

Preliminary Relegation Playoff:

- Simonstown Gaels 0-10, 0-7 Ballinlough, Kells, 7/10/2001,

=== Group C ===
Team	Pld	W	L	D	PF	PA	PD	Pts
Skryne	3	2	0	1	50	11	+39	5
Oldcastle	3	2	1	0	25	29	-4	4
Gaeil Colmcille	3	1	2	0	27	43	-16	2
Syddan	3	0	2	1	30	35	-5	1

Round 1:

- Gaeil Colmcille 0-11, 1-6 Syddan, Carlanstown, 22/4/2001,
- Skryne 1-10, 0-4 Oldcastle, Pairc Tailteann, 22/4/2001,

Round 2:

- Skryne 0–10, 1-7 Syddan, Kilberry, 13/5/2001,
- Oldcastle 0-7, 0-5 Gaeil Colmcille, Kilskyre, 13/5/2001,

Round 3:

- Oldcastle 1-11, 0-11 Syddan, Carlanstown, 10/6/2001,
- Skryne 4-15, 1-1 Gaeil Colmcille, Pairc Tailteann, 10/6/2001,

=== Group D ===
Team	Pld	W	L	D	PF	PA	PD	Pts
Cortown	3	2	0	1	37	35	+2	5
Dunderry	3	2	1	0	39	38	+1	4
St. Peter's Dunboyne	3	1	1	1	30	20	+10	3
Navan O'Mahonys	3	0	2	1	26	39	-13	1

Round 1:

- St. Peter's Dunboyne 2-7, 0-2 Navan O'Mahonys, Dunsany, 24/4/2001,
- Cortown 3-8, 1-12 Dunderry, Pairc Tailteann, 24/4/2001,

Round 2:

- Dunderry 2-7, 1-8 Navan O'Mahonys, Athboy, 13/5/2001,
- Cortown 0–7, 1-4 St. Peter's Dunboyne, Trim, 22/5/2001

Round 3:

- Dunderry 0-11, 0-10 St. Peter's Dunboyne, Dunshaughlin, 10/6/2001,
- Cortown 3–4, 1-10 Navan O'Mahonys, Kells, 10/6/2001,

== Knock-out Stage ==
=== Relegation Finals ===
- Summerhill 0-6, 1-2 Navan O'Mahonys, Dunsany, 14/10/2001,
- Ballinlough 3-8, 1-10 Syddan, Kells, 28/10/2001,

=== Finals ===
Quarter-finals
Walterstown	0-9
Cortown	0-8
Dunshaughlin	3-7
Oldcastle	2-8
Skryne	1-10
Kilmainhamwood	1-8
Dunderry	1-10
Trim	1-3

Semi-finals
Walterstown	2-7
Dunshaughlin	1-11
Skryne	1-11
Dunderry	1-8

Final
Dunshaughlin	0-11
Skryne	1-5

Quarter-final:

- Dunderry 1-10, 1-3 Trim, Pairc Tailteann, 6/10/2001,
- Dunshaughlin 3-7, 2-8 Oldcastle, Kells, 7/10/2001,
- Skryne 1-10, 1-8 Kilmainhamwood, Pairc Tailteann, 7/10/2001,
- Walterstown 0-9, 0-8 Cortown, Pairc Tailteann, 7/10/2001,

Semi-final:

- Dunshaughlin 1-11, 2-7 Walterstown, Pairc Tailteann, 21/10/2001,
- Skryne 1-11, 1-8 Dunderry, Pairc Tailteann, 21/10/2001,

Final:

- Dunshaughlin 0-11, 1-5 Skryne, Pairc Tailteann, 4/11/2001,
