= 2000 Meath Senior Football Championship =

Meath S.F.C.
- Season: 2000
- Champions: Dunshaughlin; 1st Senior Football Championship title
- Relegated: Blackhall Gaels; Moynalvey
- Leinster SCFC: Dunshaughlin (Quarter-final) Moorefield 4-7 Dunshaughlin 0-6,
- All Ireland SCFC: n/a
- Winning Captain: Dermot Kealy (Dunshaughlin)
- Man of the Match: Richie Kealy (Dunshaughlin)

The 2000 Meath Senior Football Championship was the 108th edition of the Meath GAA's premier club Gaelic football tournament for senior graded teams in County Meath, Ireland. The tournament consisted of 16 teams, with the winner going on to represent Meath in the Leinster Senior Club Football Championship. The championship started with a group stage and then progressed to a knock out stage.

Skryne were the defending champions after they defeated Dunshaughlin in the previous year's final.

Syddan were promoted after claiming the 1999 Meath Intermediate Football Championship title, their second Intermediate win.

On 17 September 2000, Dunshaughlin claimed their first ever and also the first of three successive Senior Championship titles with a 1-19 to 2-6 win over Kilmainhamwood. The game was broadcast live across Ireland on TG4. Dermot Kealy raised the Keegan Cup for Dunshaughlin while his brother Richie claimed the 'Man of the Match' award.

Moynalvey were relegated after 17 years in the senior grade. Blackhall Gaels were also relegated after 2 years as a senior club.

== Team changes ==
The following teams changed division since the 1999 championship season:

=== To S.F.C. ===
Promoted from I.F.C.

- Syddan - (Intermediate Champions)

=== From S.F.C. ===
Relegated to I.F.C.

- Carnaross
- Slane

== Participating teams ==
The teams competing in the 2000 Meath Senior Championship were:

Club	Location	1999 Championship Position	2000 Championship Position
Ballinlough	Ballinlough & Kilskyre	Quarter-Finalist	Non-Qualifier
Blackhall Gaels	Batterstown & Kilcloon	Non Qualifier	Relegated to I.F.C
Cortown	Cortown	Quarter-Finalist	Non-Qualifier
Dunderry	Dunderry & Robinstown	Semi-Finalist	Quarter-Finalist
Dunshaughlin	Dunshaughlin & Drumree	Finalist	Champions
Gaeil Colmcille	Kells	Non Qualifier	Relegation Play Off
Kilmainhamwood	Kilmainhamwood	Non Qualifier	Finalist
Moynalvey	Moynalvey & Kiltale	Relegation Play Off	Relegated to I.F.C
Navan O'Mahonys	Navan	Non Qualifier	Relegation Play Off
Oldcastle	Oldcastle	Non Qualifier	Non-Qualifier
Seneschalstown	Kentstown & Yellow Furze	Non Qualifier	Non-Qualifier
Simonstown Gaels	Navan	Quarter-Finalist	Quarter-Finalist
Skryne	Skryne & Tara	Champions	Semi-Finalist
St. Peter's Dunboyne	Dunboyne	Non Qualifier	Non-Qualifier
Summerhill	Summerhill	Quarter-Finalist	Quarter-Finalist
Syddan	Lobinstown & Newtown	I.F.C Champions	Quarter-Finalist
Trim	Trim	Relegation Play Off	Semi-Finalist
Walterstown	Navan	Semi-Finalist	Non-Qualifier

== Group stage ==
=== Group A ===
Team	Pld	W	L	D	Pts
Summerhill	4	3	0	1	7
Kilmainhamwood	4	3	1	0	6
Walterstown	4	1	2	1	3
Seneschalstown	4	1	3	0	2
Moynalvey	4	1	3	0	2

Round 1:

- Seneschalstown +1, -1 Walterstown, Pairc Tailteann, 30/4/2000,
- Summerhill 2-5, 0-9 Kilmainhamwood, Dunderry, 30/4/2000,
- Moynalvey - Bye,

Round 2:

- Moynalvey 0-11, 0-5 Seneschalstown, 13/5/2000,
- Summerhill 1-8, 0-11 Walterstown, Trim, 13/5/2000,
- Kilmainhamwood - Bye,

Round 3:

- Kilmainhamwood 0-11, 0-9 Moynalvey, Walterstown, 18/6/2000,
- Summerhill 0-14, 1-9 Seneschalstown, Dunsany, 16/6/2000,
- Walterstown - Bye,

Round 4:

- Walterstown 0-15, 1-4 Moynalvey, Summerhill, 9/7/2000,
- Kilmainhamwood 1-13, 1-10 Seneschalstown, Pairc Tailteann, 9/7/2000,
- Summerhill - Bye,

Round 5:

- Summerhill 1-13, 1-8 Moynalvey, Dunsany, 22/7/2000,
- Kilmainhamwood 2-5, 0-6 Walterstown, Pairc Tailteann, 22/7/2000,
- Seneschalstown - Bye,

Relegation Play Off:

- Seneschalstown 2-11, 0-11 Moynalvey, Dunsany, 3/10/2000,

=== Group B ===
Team	Pld	W	L	D	Pts
Dunderry	4	3	0	1	7
Trim	4	3	1	0	6
Oldcastle	4	1	3	0	2
Ballinlough	4	1	2	1	3
Navan O'Mahonys	4	1	3	0	2

Round 1:

- Trim 2-9, 0-13 Ballinlough, Athboy, 13/5/2000,
- Navan O'Mahonys 0-12, 0-9 Oldcastle, Kells, 22/4/2000,
- Dunderry - Bye,

Round 2:

- Trim 2-11, 0-9 Navan O'Mahonys, Dunsany, 9/6/2000,
- Dunderry 2-7, 1-10 Ballinlough, Kells, 9/6/2000,
- Oldcastle - Bye,

Round 3:

- Ballinlough 2-13, 2-8 Navan O'Mahonys, Kells, 17/6/2000,
- Dunderry 0-10, 0-7 Oldcastle, Kells, 23/6/2000,
- Trim - Bye,

Round 4:

- Oldcastle 2-11, 2-9 Ballinlough, Kells, 9/7/2000,
- Dunderry 1-16, 1-11 Trim, Dunsany, 9/7/2000,
- Navan O'Mahonys - Bye,

Round 5:

- Trim 1-11, 1-6 Oldcastle, Athboy, 20/7/2000,
- Dunderry 0-10, 1-5 Navan O'Mahonys, Pairc Tailteann, 20/7/2000,
- Ballinlough - Bye,

Preliminary Relegation Playoff:

- Oldcastle 2-7, 0-8 Navan O'Mahonys, Kells, 3/10/2000,

=== Group C ===
Team	Pld	W	L	D	Pts
Syddan	3	1	0	2	4
Simonstown Gaels	3	2	1	0	4
St. Peter's Dunboyne	3	1	1	1	3
Gaeil Colmcille	3	0	2	1	1

Round 1:

- Syddan 0-8, 0-8 St. Peter's Dunboyne, Walterstown, 29/4/2000,
- Simonstown Gaels +2, -2 Gaeil Colmcille, Pairc Tailteann, 30/4/2000,

Round 2:

- Syddan 1-9, 1-9 Gaeil Colmcille, Carlanstown, 16/6/2000,
- Simonstown Gaels 0-12, 0-10 St. Peter's Dunboyne, Pairc Tailteann, 18/6/2000,

Round 3:

- Syddan 5-12, 0-9 Simonstown Gaels, Pairc Tailteann, 9/7/2000,
- St. Peter's Dunboyne 1-13, 1-4 Gaeil Colmcille, Walterstown, 9/7/2000,

=== Group D ===
Team	Pld	W	L	D	Pts
Skryne	3	3	0	0	6
Dunshaughlin	3	2	1	0	4
Cortown	3	1	2	0	2
Blackhall Gaels	3	0	3	0	0

Round 1:

- Dunshaughlin 0-21, 0-7 Blackhall Gaels, Skryne, 30/4/2000,
- Skryne 3-15, 1-7 Cortown, Pairc Tailteann, 29/4/2000,

Round 2:

- Skryne 2-12, 2-9 Dunshaughlin, Pairc Tailteann, 18/6/2000,
- Cortown 0-14, 0-13 Blackhall Gaels, Bective, 16/6/2000,

Round 3:

- Dunshaughlin 6-11, 0-8 Cortown, Trim, 7/7/2000,
- Skryne 3-11, 0-11 Blackhall Gaels, Dunboyne, 8/7/2000,

== Knock-out stage ==
=== Relegation play off ===
- Gaeil Colmcille 2-14, 1-4 Moynalvey, Walterstown, 1/10/2000,
- Navan O'Mahonys 1-6, 0-9 Blackhall Gaels, Dunsany, 1/10/2000,
- Navan O'Mahonys 1-17, 2-13 Blackhall Gaels, Dunsany, 15/10/2000, (AET)

=== Finals ===
Quarter-finals
Summerhill	1-4
Trim	1-9
Syddan	1-6
Dunshaughlin	0-17
Dunderry	1-9
Kilmainhamwood	3-8
Skryne	2-9
Simonstown Gaels	0-10

Semi-finals
Trim	0-12
Dunshaughlin	2-11
Kilmainhamwood	3-12
Skryne	1-13

Final
Dunshaughlin	1-19
Kilmainhamwood	2-6

Quarter-final:

- Dunshaughlin 0-17, 1-6 Syddan, Pairc Tailteann, 28/7/2000,
- Trim 1-9, 1-4 Summerhill, Pairc Tailteann, 13/8/2000,
- Kilmainhamwood 1-9, 0-12 Dunderry, Pairc Tailteann, 4/9/2000,
- Skryne 2-9, 0-10 Simonstown Gaels, Pairc Tailteann, 1/8/2000,

Quarter-final Replay:

- Kilmainhamwood 3-8, 1-9 Dunderry, 20/8/2000,

Semi-final:

- Dunshaughlin 2-11, 0-12 Trim, Pairc Tailteann, 2/9/2000,
- Kilmainhamwood 3-12, 1-13 Skryne, Pairc Tailteann, 3/9/2000,

Final:

- Dunshaughlin 1-19, 2-6 Kilmainhamwood, Pairc Tailteann, 17/9/2000,
