= 1999 Meath Senior Football Championship =

Meath S.F.C.
- Season: 1999
- Champions: Skryne; 11th Senior Football Championship title
- Relegated: Carnaross; Slane
- Leinster SCFC: St. Peter's Dunboyne (Semi-final) Sarsfields 1-16 St Peters Dunboyne 0-6,
- All Ireland SCFC: n/a
- Winning Captain: Mick O'Dowd (Skryne)
- Man of the Match: Trevor Giles (Skryne)

The 1999 Meath Senior Football Championship was the 107th edition of the Meath GAA's premier club Gaelic football tournament for senior graded teams in County Meath, Ireland. The tournament consists of 16 teams, with the winner going on to represent Meath in the Leinster Senior Club Football Championship. The championship starts with a group stage and then progresses to a knock out stage.

St. Peter's Dunboyne were the defending champions after they defeated Oldcastle in the previous years final, however in this year's campaign they failed to progress past the group phase. They were chosen to represent Meath in the 1999 Leinster Senior Club Football Championship as the Meath SFC was still ongoing by the first round of the Leinster Club SFC at the beginning of November.

Blackhall Gaels were promoted after claiming the 1998 Meath Intermediate Football Championship title, their first Intermediate win and hence their first period as a Senior club.

On 21 November 2000, Skryne claimed their 11th Senior Championship title with a 1–12 to 0–8 win over Dunshaughlin in the final. Mick O'Dowd raised the Keegan Cup for Skryne while All-Star Trevor Giles claimed the 'Man of the Match' award.

This year, automatic promotion and relegation were introduced to the Meath SFC and IFC. This means that clubs in the top two grades can no longer afford to lose a few championship games without putting their status in serious peril. In bygone times, when clubs had to apply for demotion, the championship had stagnated, leading to the non-fulfillment of fixtures as the competitions meandered towards their conclusions. Carnaross and Slane were the first clubs to feel the wrath of relegation. Carnaross were relegated after 6 years in the senior grade while Slane were relegated after 15 years as a senior club.

== Team changes ==
The following teams have changed division since the 1998 championship season.

=== To S.F.C. ===
Promoted from I.F.C.

- Blackhall Gaels - (Intermediate Champions)

=== From S.F.C. ===
Regraded to I.F.C.

- St. Michael's

== Participating teams ==
The teams competing in the 1999 Meath Senior Championship are:

Club	Location	1998 Championship Position	1999 Championship Position
Ballinlough	Ballinlough & Kilskyre	Non Qualifier	Quarter-Finalist
Blackhall Gaels	Batterstown & Kilcloon	I.F.C Champions	Non Qualifier
Carnaross	Carnaross	Non Qualifier	Relegated to I.F.C
Cortown	Cortown	Non Qualifier	Quarter-Finalist
Dunderry	Dunderry & Robinstown	Quarter-Finalist	Semi-Finalist
Dunshaughlin	Dunshaughlin & Drumree	Non Qualifier	Finalist
Gaeil Colmcille	Kells	Non Qualifier	Non Qualifier
Kilmainhamwood	Kilmainhamwood	Non Qualifier	Non Qualifier
Moynalvey	Moynalvey & Kiltale	Non Qualifier	Relegation Play Off
Navan O'Mahonys	Navan	Quarter-Finalist	Non Qualifier
Oldcastle	Oldcastle	Finalist	Non Qualifier
Seneschalstown	Kentstown & Yellow Furze	Non Qualifier	Non Qualifier
Simonstown Gaels	Navan	Semi-Finalist	Quarter-Finalist
Skryne	Skryne & Tara	Semi-Finalist	Champions
Slane	Slane & Monknewtown	Non Qualifier	Relegated to I.F.C
St. Peter's Dunboyne	Dunboyne	Champions	Non Qualifier
Summerhill	Summerhill	Non Qualifier	Quarter-Finalist
Trim	Trim	Non Qualifier	Relegation Play Off
Walterstown	Navan	Non Qualifier	Semi-Finalist

== Group stage ==
=== Group A ===
Team	Pld	W	L	D	Pts
Skryne	4	2	0	2	6
Dunderry	4	3	1	0	6
Blackhall Gaels	4	2	2	0	4
Oldcastle	4	1	2	1	3
Moynalvey	4	0	3	1	1

Round 1:

- Skryne 0–14, 2-8 Moynalvey, Summerhill, 4/4/1999,
- Dunderry 1-12, 1-10 Blackhall Gaels, 18/4/1999,
- Oldcastle - Bye,

Round 2:

- Dunderry w, l Oldcastle,
- Blackhall Gaels 0-11, 0-6 Moynalvey,
- Skryne - Bye,

Round 3:

- Skryne 0–12, 0-12 Oldcastle, 13/6/1999,
- Dunderry 2-11, 1-10 Moynalvey, 13/6/1999,
- Blackhall Gaels - Bye,

Round 4:

- Skryne 2-13, 1-8 Dunderry, 11/7/1999,
- Blackhall Gaels 1-9, 0-10 Oldcastle, 11/7/1999,
- Moynalvey - Bye,

Round 5:

- Skryne 0-18, 1-9 Blackhall Gaels, 5/9/1999,
- Oldcastle 3-13, 1-9 Moynalvey, 5/9/1999,
- Dunderry - Bye,

=== Group B ===
Team	Pld	W	L	D	Pts
Summerhill	4	3	1	0	6
Ballinlough	4	2	1	1	5
Seneschalstown	4	2	1	1	5
Gaeil Colmcille	4	1	3	0	2
Carnaross	4	1	3	0	2

Round 1:

- Ballinlough 0-14, 0-10 Gaeil Colmcille, Drumbaragh, 4/4/1999,
- Seneschalstown 1-12, 1-7 Carnaross, Kells, 4/4/1999,
- Summerhill - Bye,

Round 2:

- Summerhill 2-15, 2-7 Carnaross, 2/5/1999,
- Ballinlough 0–12, 0–12, Seneschalstown, 2/5/1999,
- Gaeil Colmcille - Bye,

Round 3:

- Summerhill 0-12, 1-5 Gaeil Colmcille, 13/6/1999,
- Carnaross 2-12, 2-9 Ballinlough, 13/6/1999,
- Seneschalstown - Bye,

Round 4:

- Ballinlough 0-16, 1-10 Summerhill, 5/9/1999,
- Seneschalstown 2-9, 0-13 Gaeil Colmcille, 5/9/1999,
- Carnarosss - Bye,

Round 5:

- Summerhill 1-14, 2-6 Seneschalstown, 11/7/1999,
- Gaeil Colmcille 0-13, 1-7 Carnaross, 11/7/1999,
- Ballinlough - Bye,

Quarter-final Play Off:

- Ballinlough 1-5, 1-4 Seneschalstown, 3/10/1999,

Relegation Play Off:

- Gaeil Colmcille 0-15, 1-6 Carnaross, Carlanstown, 10/10/1999,

=== Group C ===
Team	Pld	W	L	D	Pts
Cortown	4	3	1	0	6
Simonstown Gaels	4	3	1	0	6
Navan O'Mahonys	4	2	2	0	4
Kilmainhamwood	4	1	3	0	2
Slane	4	1	3	0	2

Round 1:

- Slane 1-12, 2-8 Cortown, Walterstown, 4/4/1999,
- Simonstown Gaels 1-10, 0-12 Kilmainhamwood, Pairc Tailteann, 4/4/1999,
- Navan O'Mahonys - Bye,

Round 2:

- Kilmainhamwood 0-13, 0-8 Slane, 2/5/1999,
- Cortown 1-10, 0-12 Navan O'Mahonys, 2/5/1999,
- Simonstown Gaels - Bye,

Round 3:

- Simonstown Gaels 1-8, 0-9 Navan O'Mahonys, 13/6/1999,
- Cortown +1, -1 Kilmainhamwood,
- Slane - Bye,

Round 4:

- Navan O'Mahonys 2-6, 1-8 Slane, 11/7/1999,
- Cortown 1-15, 2-7 Simonstown Gaels, 11/7/1999,
- Kilmainhamwood - Bye,

Round 5:

- Simonstown Gaels 5-11, 0-8 Slane, 5/9/1999,
- Navan O'Mahonys 1-18, 1-7 Kilmainhamwood, 5/9/1999,
- Cortown - Bye,

Relegation Play Off:

- Kilmainhamwood 1-13, 1-10 Slane, 10/10/1999,

=== Group D ===
Team	Pld	W	L	D	Pts
Dunshaughlin	3	2	1	0	4
Walterstown	3	2	1	0	4
St. Peter's Dunboyne	3	1	2	0	2
Trim	3	1	2	0	2

Round 1:

- Walterstown 2-9, 0-8 Dunshaughlin, Pairc Tailteann, 4/4/1999,
- Trim 0-8, 0-6 St. Peter's Dunboyne, 18/4/1999,

Round 2:

- Dunshaughlin 1-8, 1-7 St. Peter's Dunboyne, 20/6/1999,
- Walterstown w, l Trim,

Round 3:

- Dunshaughlin 0-18, 0-12 Trim, 10/7/1999,
- St. Peter's Dunboyne 1-11, 2-7 Walterstown, 11/7/1999,

Relegation Play Off:

- St. Peter's Dunboyne 0-12, 1-8 Trim, 3/10/1999,

== Knock-out Stage ==
=== Relegation Play Off ===
- Moynalvey 1-8, 1-7 Slane, Walterstown, 24/10/1999,
- Trim 0–11, 1-8 Carnaross, Kilberry, 24/10/1999,
- Trim 3-9, 3-4 Carnaross, Kilberry, 7/11/1999,

=== Finals ===
Quarter-finals
Skryne	1-10
Ballinlough	1-9
Cortown	1-8
Walterstown	0-16
Summerhill	0-15
Dunderry	1-15
Dunshaughlin	1-10
Simonstown Gaels	1-7

Semi-finals
Skryne	0-14
Walterstown	0-8
Dunderry	2-2
Dunshaughlin	1-8

Final
Skryne	1-12
Dunshaughlin	0-8

Quarter-final:

- Dunshaughlin 1-10, 1-7 Simonstown Gaels, Pairc Tailteann, 3/10/1999,
- Walterstown 1–11, 1-11 Cortown, Pairc Tailteann, 10/10/1999,
- Skryne 1-10, 1-9 Ballinlough, Pairc Tailteann, 17/10/1999,
- Dunderry 0–11, 0-11 Summerhill, Pairc Tailteann, 17/10/1999,

Quarter-final Replay:

- Dunderry 1-15, 0-15 Summerhill, Pairc Tailteann, 24/10/1999,
- Walterstown 0-16, 1-8 Cortown, Pairc Tailteann, 24/10/1999,

Semi-final:

- Skryne 0-14, 0-8 Walterstown, Pairc Tailteann, 6/11/1999,
- Dunshaughlin 1-8, 2-2 Dunderry, Pairc Tailteann, 7/11/1999,

Final:

- Skryne 1-12, 0-8 Dunshaughlin, Pairc Tailteann, 21/11/1999,

== Leinster Senior Club Football Championship ==
Quarter-final:

- Sarsfields 1-15, 0-6 St. Peter's Dunboyne, St. Conleth's Park, 7/11/1999,
