= 1998 Meath Senior Football Championship =

Meath S.F.C.
- Season: 1998
- Champions: St. Peter's Dunboyne; 1st Senior Football Championship title
- Relegated: St. Michael's
- Leinster SCFC: St. Peter's Dunboyne (Quarter-final) Kilmacud Crokes 2-7 St Peters Dunboyne 1-9,
- All Ireland SCFC: n/a
- Winning Captain: Enda McManus (St. Peter's Dunboyne)
- Man of the Match: Enda McManus (St. Peter's Dunboyne)

The 1998 Meath Senior Football Championship was the 106th edition of the Meath GAA's premier club Gaelic football tournament for senior graded teams in County Meath, Ireland. The tournament consists of 19 teams, with the winner going on to represent Meath in the Leinster Senior Club Football Championship. The championship starts with a group stage and then progresses to a knock out stage.

Navan O'Mahonys were the defending champions after they defeated Trim in the previous years final, but they exited to eventual champions St. Peter's Dunboyne this year at the quarter-final stage.

Dunshaughlin were promoted after claiming the 1997 Meath Intermediate Football Championship title, their second Intermediate win and hence their second period as a Senior club.

On 11 October 1998, St. Peter's Dunboyne claimed their first Senior Championship title with a 0-9 to 0-5 win over Oldcastle in the final. Enda McManus raised the Keegan Cup for Dunboyne and also claimed the 'Man of the Match' award

At the end of the championship season, St. Michael's applied to the Meath County Board to be regraded to the 1999 Meath Intermediate Football Championship after a series of poor results. This ended their nine-year stay in the senior grade since being promoted in 1989.

== Team changes ==
The following teams have changed division since the 1998 championship season.

=== To S.F.C. ===
Promoted from I.F.C.

- Dunshaughlin - (Intermediate Champions)

=== From S.F.C. ===
Regraded to I.F.C.

- None

== Participating teams ==
The teams competing in the 1998 Meath Senior Championship are:

Club	Location	1997 Championship Position	1998 Championship Position
Ballinlough	Ballinlough & Kilskyre	Non Qualifier	Non Qualifier
Carnaross	Carnaross	Non Qualifier	Non Qualifier
Cortown	Cortown	Semi-Finalist	Non Qualifier
Dunderry	Dunderry & Robinstown	Non Qualifier	Quarter-Finalist
Dunshaughlin	Dunshaughlin & Drumree	I.F.C Champions	Non Qualifier
Gaeil Colmcille	Kells	Quarter-Finalist	Non Qualifier
Kilmainhamwood	Kilmainhamwood	Non Qualifier	Non Qualifier
Moynalvey	Moynalvey & Kiltale	Non Qualifier	Non Qualifier
Navan O'Mahonys	Navan	Champions	Quarter-Finalist
Oldcastle	Oldcastle	Non Qualifier	Finalist
Seneschalstown	Kentstown & Yellow Furze	Quarter-Finalist	Non Qualifier
Simonstown Gaels	Navan	Semi-Finalist	Semi-Finalist
Skryne	Skryne & Tara	Non Qualifier	Semi-Finalist
Slane	Slane & Monknewtown	Non Qualifier	Non Qualifier
St. Michael's	Carlanstown & Kilbeg	Non Qualifier	Relegated to I.F.C
St. Peter's Dunboyne	Dunboyne	Non Qualifier	Champions
Summerhill	Summerhill	Non Qualifier	Non Qualifier
Trim	Trim	Finalist	Non Qualifier
Walterstown	Navan	Non Qualifier	Non Qualifier

== Group stage ==
=== Group A ===
Team	Pld	W	L	D	PF	PA	PD	Pts
Oldcastle	6	5	0	1	74	47	+27	11
St. Peter's Dunboyne	6	5	1	0	91	65	+26	10
Kilmainhamwood	6	4	2	0	80	63	+27	8
Summerhill	6	3	3	0	80	70	+10	6
Carnaross	6	2	3	1	75	87	-12	5
St. Michael's	6	1	5	0	44	80	-36	2
Slane	6	0	6	0	31	67	-36	0

Round 1:

- Oldcastle 0-16, 1-13 Carnaross, Ballinlough, 5/4/1998,
- St. Peter's Dunboyne 2-10, 1-9 Slane, Pairc Tailteann, 11/4/1998,
- Kilmainhamwood 0-10, 1-6 St. Michael's, Kells, 12/4/1998,
- Summerhill - Bye,

Round 2:

- Kilmainhamwood 2-10, 0-8 Summerhill, Martry, 18/4/1998,
- Oldcastle 1-10, 0-9 St. Peter's Dunboyne, Pairc Tailteann, 18/4/1998,
- Carnaross 2-13, 1-11 St. Michael's, Kells, 19/4/1998,
- Slane - Bye,

Round 3:

- Kilmainhamwood 2-14, 3-5 Carnaross, Kells, 3/6/1998,
- Summerhill 1-12, 0-6 Slane, Skryne, 5/6/1998,
- St. Peter's Dunboyne 5-16, 1-3 St. Michael's, Bective, 6/6/1998,
- Oldcastle - Bye,

Round 4:

- Kilmainhamwood 0-14, 1-5 Slane, Kilberry, 4/7/1998,
- St. Peter's Dunboyne 0-16, 1-12 Carnaross, Pairc Tailteann, 4/7/1998,
- Oldcastle 0-11, 0-7 Summerhill, Athboy, 4/7/1998,
- St. Michael's - Bye,

Round 5:

- Oldcastle 4-10, 0-5 Slane, Martry, 18/7/1998,
- St. Peter's Dunboyne 1-9, 1-7 Kilmainhamwood, Pairc Tailteann, 16/8/1998,
- Summerhill 1-17, 1-12 St. Michael's,
- Carnaross - Bye,

Round 6:

- Summerhill 2-15, 2-5 Carnaross, Pairc Tailteann, 22/8/1998,
- Oldcastle 0-12, 1-7 Kilmainhamwood, Kells, 23/8/1998,
- St. Michael's w/o, scr Slane,
- St. Peter's Dunboyne - Bye,

Round 7:

- St. Peter's Dunboyne 0-11, 0-9 Summerhill, Dunshaughlin, 30/8/1998,
- Oldcastle w/o, scr St. Michael's, Carnaross, 30/8/1998,
- Carnaross w/o, scr Slane,
- Kilmainhamwood - Bye,

=== Group B ===
Team	Pld	W	L	D	PF	PA	PD	Pts
Skryne	5	3	2	0	93	68	+25	6
Simonstown Gaels	5	3	2	0	59	50	+9	6
Gaeil Colmcille	5	3	2	0	64	50	+14	6
Ballinlough	5	3	2	0	54	58	-4	6
Dunshaughlin	5	2	3	0	50	51	-1	4
Moynalvey	5	1	4	0	43	86	-43	2

Round 1:

- Skryne 0-17, 1-13 Gaeil Colmcille, Pairc Tailteann, 5/4/1998,
- Simonstown Gaels 1-7, 0-6 Dunshaughlin, Pairc Tailteann, 11/4/1998,
- Ballinlough 0-13, 2-5 Moynalvey, Kildalkey, 11/4/1998,

Round 2:

- Gaeil Colmcille 0-12, 0-9 Dunshaughlin, Kilberry, 18/4/1998,
- Ballinlough 1-13, 1-10 Skryne, Walterstown, 18/4/1998,
- Moynalvey 1-9, 1-8 Simonstown Gaels, Summerhill, 19/4/1998,

Round 3:

- Dunshaughlin 1-12, 0-9 Ballinlough, Pairc Tailteann, 5/6/1998,
- Skryne 6-19, 1-3 Moynalvey, Dunshaughlin, 5/6/1998,
- Gaeil Colmcille 0-12, 0-8 Simonstown Gaels, Martry, 6/6/1998,

Round 4:

- Dunshaughlin 0-10, 1-5 Moynalvey, Dunboyne, 4/7/1998,
- Simonstown Gaels 3-11, 1-11 Skryne, Pairc Tailteann, 5/7/1998,
- Ballinlough 1-7, 1-6 Gaeil Colmcille, Drumbaragh, 5/7/1998,

Round 5:

- Gaeil Colmcille 0-15, 0-6 Moynalvey, Dunderry, 18/7/1998,
- Simonstown Gaels 0-10, 0-6 Ballinlough, Kells, 18/7/1998,
- Skryne 0-12, 0-10 Dunshaughlin, Pairc Tailteann, 16/8/1998,

Quarter-final Playoff:

- Skryne 4-14, 1-9 Ballinlough, Pairc Tailteann, 21/8/1998,
- Simonstown Gaels 0-16, 0-11 Gaeil Colmcille, Pairc Tailteann, 22/8/1998,

=== Group B ===
Team	Pld	W	L	D	PF	PA	PD	Pts
Dunderry	5	4	1	0	65	53	+12	8
Navan O'Mahonys	5	3	2	0	57	49	+8	6
Seneschalstown	5	3	2	0	65	55	+10	6
Walterstown	5	3	2	0	54	54	+0	6
Cortown	5	2	3	0	68	79	-11	4
Trim	5	0	5	0	53	72	-19	70

Round 1:

- Seneschalstown 2-10, 2-7 Trim, Pairc Tailteann, 4/4/1998,
- Dunderry 1-10, 0-7 Navan O'Mahonys, Kells, 4/4/1998,
- Walterstown 0-20, 1-9 Cortown, Pairc Tailteann, 5/4/1998,

Round 2:

- Dunderry 0-12, 1-6 Trim, Kildalkey, 18/4/1998,
- Seneschalstown 1-5, 0-7 Cortown, Pairc Tailteann, 19/4/1998,
- Walterstown 1-6, 0-7 Navan O'Mahonys, Pairc Tailteann, 19/4/1998,

Round 3:

- Dunderry 3-7, 1-10 Seneschalstown, Pairc Tailteann, 6/6/1998,
- Walterstown 1-9, 0-7 Trim, Pairc Tailteann, 6/6/1998,
- Navan O'Mahonys 2-15, 0-9 Cortown, Dunderry, 7/6/1998,

Round 4:

- Cortown 1-19, 2-10 Trim, Kildalkey, 4/7/1998,
- Navan O'Mahonys 0-12, 0-10 Seneschalstown, Pairc Tailteann, 5/7/1998,
- Dunderry 0-10, 0-6 Walterstown, Pairc Tailteann, 5/7/1998,

Round 5:

- Seneschalstown 1-15, 1-4 Walterstown, Pairc Tailteann, 15/8/1998,
- Navan O'Mahonys 0-10, 0-8 Trim, Kilmessan, 16/8/1998,
- Cortown 3-9, 2-8 Dunderry, Trim, 16/8/1998,

Quarter-final Playoff Semi-final:

- Seneschalstown 1-12, 1-9 Walterstown, Pairc Tailteann, 28/8/1998,

Quarter-final Playoff Final:

- Navan O'Mahonys 0-5, 1-2 Seneschalstown, Pairc Tailteann, 6/9/1998,

Quarter-final Playoff Final Replay:

- Navan O'Mahonys 2-8, 0-9 Seneschalstown, Pairc Tailteann, 13/9/1998,

== Knock-out Stage ==
=== Finals ===
Quarter-finals
Dunderry	1-7
Simonstown Gaels	1-8
Oldcastle
Bye
Skryne
Bye
St. Peter's Dunboyne	0-13
Navan O'Mahonys	0-6

Semi-finals
Oldcastle	0-11
Simonstown Gaels	1-7
Skryne	0-10
St. Peter's Dunboyne	1-10

Final
Oldcastle	0-5
St. Peter's Dunboyne	0-9

Quarter-final:

- Simonstown Gaels 1-8, 1-7 Dunderry, Pairc Tailteann, 30/8/1998,
- St. Peter's Dunboyne 0-13, 0-6 Navan O'Mahonys, Pairc Tailteann, 20/9/1998,

Semi-final:

- Oldcastle 0-11, 1-7 Simonstown Gaels, Pairc Tailteann, 20/9/1998,
- St. Peter's Dunboyne 1-10, 0-10 Skryne, Pairc Tailteann, 27/9/1998,

Final:

- St. Peter's Dunboyne 0-9, 0-5 Oldcastle, Pairc Tailteann, 11/10/1998,

== Leinster Senior Club Football Championship ==
Preliminary round:

- Kilmacud Crokes 2-7, 1-9 St. Peter's Dunboyne, Pairc Tailteann, 8/10/1998,
