= Clonard GAA =

Gaelic sports club in County Meath, Ireland

Clonard
- Cluain Ioraird
- Founded: 1895
- County: Meath
- Colours
- Grounds: St Finian's Park

Playing kits
Standard colours

Senior Club Championships
	All Ireland	Leinster champions	Meath champions
Football:	0	0	0

Clonard GAA is a Gaelic Athletic Association club in Clonard, County Meath, Ireland. The club is affiliated to the Meath County Board and fields teams primarily in Gaelic football.

== History ==
Located in the village of Clonard, located 6km from Kinnegad, Clonard GAA was founded in 1895.

Clonard have only ever stayed within the junior ranks, and have contested two Meath JFC finals, each in 1958 and 1971. In 1958 they lost to Dunshaughlin, and in 1971 they lost to Donaghmore by 4 points.

Clonard have won two Meath JBFC titles, each in 1971 and 2011. In 1971 they played St Peter's Dunboyne B, defeating them by 6 points to win their first championship title. In 2011 they played Ratoath B, and won that game by 9 points. Clonard have also contested 3 more JBFC finals, losing to Seneschalstown B in 1996, Trim B in 1998, and St Brigid's in 2006.

As of 2026, Clonard compete in the Meath JBFC.

== Honours ==
- Meath Junior 'A' Football Championship (0): (runners-up in 1958, 1971)
- Meath Junior 'B' Football Championship (2): 1971, 2011 (runners-up in 1996, 1998, 2006)
