= 1999 Meath Intermediate Football Championship =

Meath I.F.C.
- Season: 1999
- Champions: Syddan; 2nd Intermediate Football Championship title
- Relegated: St. Ultan's; St. Brigid's Ballinacree

The 1999 Meath Intermediate Football Championship is the 73rd edition of the Meath GAA's premier club Gaelic football tournament for intermediate graded teams in County Meath, Ireland. The tournament consists of 15 teams, with the winner going on to represent Meath in the Leinster Intermediate Club Football Championship. The championship starts with a group stage and then progresses to a knock out stage.

This was St. Michael's first year in the Intermediate grade since 1989, after 9 years in the Senior grade since being regraded in 1998.

Drumree were promoted after claiming the 1998 Meath Junior Football Championship title.

On 7 November 1999, Syddan claimed their 2nd Intermediate championship title when they defeated St. Patrick's 2–11 to 1–10 in the final.

This year, automatic promotion and relegation were introduced to the Meath SFC and IFC. This means that clubs in the top two grades can no longer afford to lose a few championship games without putting their status in serious peril. In bygone times, when clubs had to apply for demotion, the championship had stagnated, leading to the non-fulfillment of fixtures as the competitions meandered towards their conclusions. St. Brigid's Ballinacree and St. Ultan's were the first clubs to feel the wrath of relegation. St. Brigid's Ballinacree were relegated after 5 years in the Intermediate grade while St. Ultan's were relegated after 9 years as an Intermediate club.

== Team changes ==
The following teams have changed division since the 1998 championship season.

=== From I.F.C. ===
Promoted to S.F.C.

- Blackhall Gaels - (Intermediate Champions)

Regraded to 1999 J.A.F.C.

- Ballinabrackey

=== To I.F.C. ===
Regraded from S.F.C.

- St. Michael's

Promoted from J.A.F.C.

- Drumree - (Junior 'A' Champions)

== Group stage ==
There are 2 groups called Group A and B. The 2 top finishers in each Group will qualify for the semi-finals. The teams that finish last in their groups will be relegated. In the event of two teams being level on points and only one qualification spot available, a playoff will be conducted to determine final placings.

=== Group A ===
| Team | Pld | W | L | D | Pts |
|---|---|---|---|---|---|
| Syddan | 7 | 6 | 0 | 1 | 13 |
| Ballivor | 7 | 5 | 1 | 1 | 11 |
| Castletown | 7 | 4 | 2 | 1 | 9 |
| St. Michael's | 7 | 3 | 4 | 0 | 6 |
| St. Colmcille's | 7 | 2 | 4 | 1 | 5 |
| Drumree | 7 | 2 | 2 | 3 | 7 |
| Drumconrath | 7 | 1 | 6 | 0 | 2 |
| St. Ultan's | 7 | 1 | 5 | 1 | 3 |

Round 1:

- Syddan 0–10, 0-10 Drumree, Walterstown, 4/4/1999,
- Drumconrath 2-12, 2-11 St. Ultan's, Kells, 4/4/1999,
- St. Michael's 1-12, 1-8 St. Colmcille's, Castletown, 4/4/1999,
- Castletown 0–8, 1-5 Ballivor, 18/4/1999,

Round 2:

- Syddan 0-12, 0-9 St. Ultan's,
- Castletown w, l Drumconrath,
- St. Michael's 1-12, 1-8 Drumree, 2/5/1999,
- Ballivor w, l St. Colmcille's,

Round 3:

- Drumree 1–10, 2-7 St. Ultan's, 13/6/1999,
- Syddan 1-11, 1-6 Castletown, 16/5/1999,
- Drumconrath 0-19, 1-7 St. Colmcille's, 16/5/1999,
- Ballivor 1-16, 1-10 St. Michael's, 16/5/1999,

Round 4:

- Syddan 3-6, 0-7 St. Colmcille's, 13/6/1999,
- Ballivor 1-8, 0-7 Drumconrath, 13/6/1999,
- Castletown 2-4, 0-6 Drumree, 19/6/1999,
- St. Ultan's 0-10, 0-5 St. Michael's, 26/6/1999,

Round 5:

- Syddan 3-8, 2-8 Ballivor, 11/7/1999,
- St. Michael's 2-9, 0-13 Drumconrath, 11/7/1999,
- St. Colmcille's 1–8, 0-11 Drumree, 11/7/1999,
- Castletown 2-12, 1-8 St. Ultan's, 11/7/1999,

Round 6:

- Syddan 2-13, 1-5 Drumconrath, 1/8/1999,
- Castletown 1-9, 0-9 St. Michael's, 1/8/1999,
- St. Colmcille's 0-18, 1-7 St. Ultan's, 1/8/1999,
- Ballivor 2-15, 2-8 Drumree, 15/8/1999,

Round 7:

- Syddan 4-12, 0-6 St. Michael's,
- Ballivor 1-13, 1-8 St. Ultan's, 12/9/1999,
- Drumree 2-16, 1-8 Drumconrath, 5/9/1999,
- St. Colmcille's w, l Castletown,

=== Group B ===
| Team | Pld | W | L | D | Pts |
|---|---|---|---|---|---|
| St. Patrick's | 6 | 5 | 1 | 0 | 10 |
| Bective | 6 | 5 | 1 | 0 | 10 |
| Rathkenny | 6 | 4 | 2 | 0 | 8 |
| Donaghmore/Ashbourne | 6 | 1 | 3 | 2 | 4 |
| Duleek | 6 | 2 | 4 | 0 | 4 |
| Moynalty | 6 | 1 | 4 | 1 | 3 |
| St. Brigid's Ballinacree | 6 | 1 | 4 | 1 | 3 |

Round 1:

- Bective 2-8, 1-4 Moynalty, Athboy, 4/4/1999,
- St. Patrick's 3-11, 1-4 St. Brigid's Ballinacree, Castletown, 4/4/1999,
- Rathkenny 0-8, 0-6 Duleek, Seneschalstown, 4/4/1999,
- Donaghmore/Ashbourne - Bye,

Round 2:

- Duleek w, l Moynalty,
- Rathkenny 2-6, 0-10 Donaghmore/Ashbourne, 13/6/1999,
- Bective 2-16, 0-9 St. Brigid's Ballinacree, 11/7/1999,
- St. Patrick's - Bye,

Round 3:

- Donaghmore/Ashbourne 0–13, 1-10 Moynalty, 16/5/1999,
- Duleek w, l St. Brigid's Ballinacree,
- Bective 3-5, 0-12 St. Patrick's, 13/6/1999,
- Rathkenny - Bye,

Round 4:

- Bective 0-12, 1-8 Duleek, 26/6/1999,
- St. Patrick's 1-13, 1-7 Rathkenny, 3/10/1999,
- Donaghmore/Ashbourne 0–9, 1-6 St. Brigid's Ballinacree, 18/4/1999,
- Moynalty - Bye,

Round 5:

- Bective 1-10, 1-2 Donaghmore/Ashbourne, 3/10/1999,
- St. Patrick's 0-15, 0-5 Duleek, 2/5/1999,
- Rathkenny 0-10, 0-7 Moynalty, 10/7/1999,
- St. Brigid's Ballinacree - Bye,

Round 6:

- St. Brigid's Ballinacree 1-9, 0-8 Rathkenny, 5/9/1999,
- Donaghmore/Ashbourne 1–13, 0-15 Duleek, 1/8/1999,
- St. Patrick's 2-19, 1-2 Moynalty, 5/9/1999,
- Bective - Bye,

Round 7:

- Moynalty 2-9, 0-10 St. Brigid's Ballinacree, 13/6/1999,
- St. Patrick's 2-11, 1-10 Donaghmore/Ashbourne, 11/7/1999,
- Rathkenny 0-10, 1-5 Bective, 2/5/1999,
- Duleek - Bye,

Relegation Play Off:

- Moynalty 1-8, 0-9 St. Brigid's Ballinacree, 3/10/1999,

== Knock-out Stages ==
=== Finals ===
The teams in the quarter-finals are the second placed teams from each group and one group winner. The teams in the semi-finals are two group winners and the quarter-final winners.

Semi-finals
1 | Syddan | 2-11
4 | Bective | 0-8
3 | St. Patrick's | 0-12
2 | Ballivor | 0-8

Final
Syddan | 2-11
St. Patrick's | 1-10

Semi-final:

- Syddan 2-11, 0-8 Bective, Kells, 24/10/1999,
- St. Patrick's 0-12, 0-8 Ballivor, Walterstown, 24/10/1999,

Final:

- Syddan 2-11, 1-10 St. Patrick's, Pairc Tailteann, 7/11/1999,
