= 2000 Meath Intermediate Football Championship =

Meath I.F.C.
- Season: 2000
- Champions: St. Patrick's; 3rd Intermediate Football Championship title
- Relegated: Bective; St. Michael's

The 2000 Meath Intermediate Football Championship is the 74th edition of the Meath GAA's premier club Gaelic football tournament for intermediate graded teams in County Meath, Ireland. The tournament consists of 16 teams, with the winner going on to represent Meath in the Leinster Intermediate Club Football Championship. The championship starts with a group stage and then progresses to a knock out stage.

This was Carnaross' first year in the Intermediate grade since 1993, after 6 years in the Senior grade since being relegated in 1999. It was also Slane's first year back in the middle grade since 1984 after 15 years in the Senior grade since being relegated in 1999. Both Carnaross and Slane were the first clubs to feel the wrath of relegation since the format was introduced in 1999.

This was Na Fianna's first year in existence as club, formed from the amalgamation of former Junior clubs Baconstown and Enfield and Rathmolyon football teams (Rathmolyon stayed separate for hurling). Na Fianna were given the choice of playing in Intermediate or staying in the Junior grade, and they decided to go for the challenge of the Intermediate grade.

St. Paul's were promoted after claiming the 1999 Meath Junior Football Championship title. This was their first period as an Intermediate club since being formed in 1974.

On 3 September 2000, St. Patrick's claimed their 2nd Intermediate championship title when they defeated Ballivor 0-9 to 0-7 in the final.

Bective were relegated after 3 years as an Intermediate club. St. Michael's were relegated after 2 years as an Intermediate club since being relegated from the senior grade in 1998.

== Team changes ==
The following teams have changed division since the 1999 championship season.

=== From I.F.C. ===
Promoted to S.F.C.

- Syddan - (Intermediate Champions)

Relegated to J.A.F.C.

- St. Ultan's
- St. Brigid's

=== To I.F.C. ===
Relegted from S.F.C.

- Carnaross
- Slane

Promoted from J.A.F.C.

- St. Paul's - (Junior 'A' Champions)
- Na Fianna - (New club formed in 2000 from Junior clubs Baconstown and Enfield. Chose to play in the Intermediate grade this year.)

== Group stage ==
There are 2 groups called Group A and B. The 2 top finishers in each Group will qualify for the semi-finals. The teams that finish last in their groups will be relegated. In the event of two teams being level on points and only one qualification spot available, a playoff will be conducted to determine final placings.

=== Group A ===
Team	Pld	W	L	D	Pts
St. Colmcille's	7	5	1	1	11
St. Patrick's	7	5	2	0	10
Na Fianna	7	4	3	0	8
Donaghmore/Ashbourne	7	3	3	1	7
St. Paul's	7	3	4	0	6
Slane	7	3	4	0	6
Rathkenny	7	3	4	0	6
Bective	7	1	6	0	2

Round 1:

- St. Patrick's 0-12, 0-10 Slane, Donore, 30/4/2000,
- St. Paul's 0-4, 0-2 Donaghmore/Ashbourne, Dunshaughlin, 2/4/2000,
- Na Fianna 5-12, 0-10 Rathkenny, Dunderry, 2/4/2000,
- St. Colmcille's w, l Bective, Skryne, 8/4/2000,

Round 2:

- St. Colmcille's 1-13, 0-4 St. Patrick's, Bellewstown, 13/5/2000,
- Na Fianna 2-11, 1-9 St. Paul's, Dunshaughlin, 13/5/2000,
- Donaghmore/Ashbourne w, l Bective, Dunshaughlin, 29/4/2000,
- Slane 0-13, 1-8 Rathkenny, Seneschalstown, 13/5/2000,

Round 3:

- St. Patrick's 0-12, 1-7 Donaghmore/Ashbourne, Seneschalstown, 17/6/2000,
- St. Paul's 0-12, 1-4 Bective, Dunsany, 18/6/2000,
- St. Colmcille's 2-13, 0-8 Rathkenny, Seneschalstown, 18/6/2000,
- Slane 2-10, 2-8 Na Fianna, Dunsany, 18/6/2000,

Round 4:

- St. Colmcille's 1-10, 0-13 Slane, Duleek, 25/6/2000,
- St. Patrick's 1-11, 2-6 St. Paul's, Skryne, 25/6/2000,
- Na Fianna 2-15, 1-9 Bective, Moynalvey, 7/7/2000,
- Rathkenny 1-11, 1-8 Donaghmore/Ashbourne, Skryne, 25/6/2000,

Round 5:

- St. Patrick's 0-19, 0-5 Bective, Duleek, 15/7/2000,
- St. Colmcille's 0-9, 0-7 Na Fianna, Dunsany, 15/7/2000,
- Donaghmore/Ashbourne 4-3, 1-8 Slane, Duleek, 9/7/2000,
- Rathkenny 4-9, 0-16 St. Paul's, Walterstown, 9/7/2000,

Round 6:

- St. Patrick's 3-17, 1-5 Na Fianna, Dunsany, 20/7/2000,
- Donaghmore/Ashbourne 1-14, 0-10 St. Colmcille's, Duleek, 20/7/2000,
- St. Paul's 2-9, 0-10 Slane, Walterstown, 23/7/2000,
- Bective 2-13, 1-8 Rathkenny, Walterstown, 20/7/2000,

Round 7:

- Rathkenny 2-8, 0-12 St. Patrick's, Duleek, 29/7/2000,
- Na Fianna w, l Donaghmore/Ashbourne,
- Slane w, l Bective,
- St. Colmcille's 1-12, 1-6 St. Paul's, Skryne, 2/8/2000,

=== Group B ===
Team	Pld	W	L	D	Pts
Drumree	7	5	0	2	12
Ballivor	7	3	0	4	10
Castletown	7	4	2	1	9
Duleek	7	4	2	1	9
Carnaross	7	3	2	2	8
Drumconrath	7	2	4	1	5
Moynalty	7	1	6	0	2
St. Michael's	7	0	7	0	0

Round 1:

- Drumree 0-13, 0-6 St. Michael's, Kilberry, 2/4/2000,
- Ballivor 2-10, 2-7 Drumconrath, Walterstown, 22/4/2000,
- Carnaross 2-12, 0-11 Castletown, Kilmainhamwood, 2/4/2000,
- Duleek w, l Moynalty, Kilberry, 8/4/2000,

Round 2:

- Drumree 0-14, 1-9 Duleek, Skryne, 29/4/2000,
- Ballivor 1-9, 1-9 St. Michael's, Martry, 13/5/2000,
- Castletown w, l Moynalty, Carlanstown, 30/4/2000,
- Carnaross 1-7, 2-4 Drumconrath, Nobber, 29/4/2000,

Round 3:

- Drumree d, d Castletown,
- Ballivor 0-11, 0-11 Duleek, Walterstown,
- Carnaross w, l Moynalty,
- Drumconrath w, l St. Michael's,

Round 4:

- Drumree 1-13, 1-7 Carnaross, Kilberry, 18/6/2000,
- Ballivor 0-12, 0-10 Castletown, Kells, 18/6/2000,
- Drumconrath 1-16, 0-5 Moynalty, Castletown, 17/6/2000,
- Duleek 1-14, 0-5 St. Michael's, Rathkenny, 17/6/2000,

Round 5:

- Drumree 1-15, 1-8 Moynalty, Kilberry, 23/6/2000,
- Ballivor 1-10, 2-7 Carnaross, Kells, 25/6/2000,
- Duleek 0-13, 0-8 Drumconrath, Seneschalstown, 25/6/2000,
- Castletown 0-14, 0-6 St. Michael's, Kilmainhamwood, 25/6/2000,

Round 6:

- Drumree 1-8, 0-8 Drumconrath, Seneschalstown, 7/7/2000,
- Ballivor 2-18, 1-6 Moynalty, Athboy, 9/7/2000,
- Carnaross 2-5, 0-4 St. Michael's, Kells, 9/7/2000,
- Castletown 0-15, 2-6 Duleek, Rathkenny, 7/7/2000,

Round 7:

- Drumree 2-5, 2-5 Ballivor, Summerhill, 30/7/2000,
- Duleek 1-6, 0-8 Carnaross, Walterstown, 23/7/2000,
- Castletown 2-10, 2-6 Drumconrath, Nobber, 22/7/2000,
- Moynalty w, l St. Michael's, Carnaross, 14/7/2000,

== Knock-out Stages ==
=== Finals ===
The teams in the quarter-finals are the second placed teams from each group and one group winner. The teams in the semi-finals are two group winners and the quarter-final winners.

Semi-finals
1	Ballivor	0-18
4	St. Colmcille's	0-14
3	Drumree	1-8
2	St. Patrick's	0-15

Final
Ballivor	0-7
St. Patrick's	0-9

Semi-final:

- Ballivor 0-18, 0-14 St. Colmcille's, Pairc Tailteann, 20/8/2000,
- St. Patrick's 0-15, 1-8 Drumree, Pairc Tailteann, 20/8/2000,

Final:

- St. Patrick's 0-9, 0-7 Ballivor, Pairc Tailteann, 3/9/2000,
