= 2001 Meath Intermediate Football Championship =

Meath I.F.C.
- Season: 2001
- Champions: Blackhall Gaels; 2nd Intermediate Football Championship title
- Relegated: St. Paul's; Moynalty

The 2001 Meath Intermediate Football Championship is the 75th edition of the Meath GAA's premier club Gaelic football tournament for intermediate graded teams in County Meath, Ireland. The tournament consists of 16 teams, with the winner going on to represent Meath in the Leinster Intermediate Club Football Championship. The championship starts with a group stage and then progresses to a knock out stage.

This was Moynalvey's first year in this grade since 1983, after 17 years in the Senior grade since being relegated in 2000. It was also Blackhall Gaels first year back in the middle grade since 1998 and on 4 November 2001, they claimed their 2nd Intermediate championship title when they defeated Ballivor 1-10 to 0-12, and in doing so made an immediate return to the Senior ranks since being relegated in 2000.

St. Ultan's were promoted after claiming the 2000 Meath Junior Football Championship title, making an immediate return to the grade since being relegated in 1999. This was their second period as an Intermediate club since being formed in 1991.

Moynalty were relegated after 14 years as an Intermediate club. St. Paul's were also relegated after just two years as an Intermediate outfit.

== Team changes ==
The following teams have changed division since the 2000 championship season.

=== From I.F.C. ===
Promoted to S.F.C.

- St. Patrick's - (Intermediate Champions)

Relegated to J.A.F.C.

- Bective/Cannistown
- St. Michael's

=== To I.F.C. ===
Relegted from S.F.C.

- Blackhall Gaels
- Moynalvey

Promoted from J.A.F.C.

- St. Ultan's - (Junior 'A' Champions)

== Group stage ==
There are 2 groups called Group A and B. The 2 top finishers in each Group will qualify for the semi-finals. The teams that finish last in their groups will be relegated. In the event of two teams being level on points and only one qualification spot available, a playoff will be conducted to determine final placings.

=== Group A ===
Team	Pld	W	L	D	PF	PA	PD	Pts
Duleek	7	6	1	0	103	68	+35	12
Blackhall Gaels	7	5	2	0	104	85	+19	10
Slane	7	4	2	1	80	76	+4	9
Carnaross	7	4	3	0	83	71	+12	8
Drumree	7	3	2	1	55*	63*	-8*	7
St. Colmcille's	7	2	3	2	77	66	+11	7
Donaghmore/Ashbourne	7	1	5	1	46*	60*	-14*	3
St. Paul's	7	0	7	0	49	94	-45	0

Round 1:

- Duleek 2-7, 1-4 Drumree, Seneschalstown, 20/4/2001,
- St. Colmcille's 1-12, 1-11 Blackhall Gaels, Walterstown, 22/4/2014,
- Carnaross 2-6, 0-8 Donaghmore/Ashbourne, Kilberry, 22/4/2001,
- Slane 2-6, 0-9 St. Paul's, Walterstown, 22/4/2001,

Round 2:

- Blackhall Gaels 4-5, 1-5 Donaghmore/Ashbourne, Dunshaughlin, 4/5/2001,
- St. Colmcille's 2-16, 0-3 St. Paul's, Stamullen, 4/5/2001,
- Drumree 2-10, 1-11 Slane, Bective, 13/5/2001
- Duleek 0-13, 2-6 Carnaross,

Round 3:

- Slane 2-4, 1-7 St. Colmcille's, Donore, 26/5/2001,
- Carnaross 1-10, 1-8 Drumree, Simonstown, 8/6/2001,
- Duleek 3-11, 0-8 Blackhall Gaels, Dunsany, 9/6/2001,
- Donaghmore/Ashbourne 0-11, 0-9 St. Paul's, Dunshaughlin, 10/6/2001,

Round 4:

- Blackhall Gaels 4-9, 0-14 Carnaross, Simonstown, 28/6/2001,
- St. Colmcille's 0-13, 2-7 Drumree, Skryne, 29/6/2001,
- Duleek 2-13, 1-10 St. Paul's, Skryne, 1/7/2001,
- Slane 1-10, 0-10 Donaghmore/Ashbourne, Dunshaughlin, 1/7/2001,

Round 5:

- Slane 0-8, 0-7 Duleek, Seneschalstown, 14/7/2001,
- St. Colmcille's 0-9, 1-6 Donaghmore/Ashbourne, Donore, 22/7/2001,
- Carnaross 2-15, 0-6 St. Paul's, Kilberry, 22/7/2001,
- Blackhall Gaels 0-10, 1-5 Drumree, Dunshaughlin, 14/8/2001,

Round 6:

- Duleek 0-17, 1-5 St. Colmcille's, Skryne, 19/8/2001,
- Slane 0-12, 1-8 Carnaross, Pairc Tailteann, 30/9/2001,
- Blackhall Gaels 2-15, 2-3 St. Paul's, Skryne, 30/9/2001,
- Drumree w, l Donaghmore/Ashbourne, Dunshaughlin, 30/9/2001,

Round 7:

- Blackhall Gaels 0-13, 1-8 Slane, Skryne, 7/10/2001,
- Duleek 1-11, 0-12 Donaghmore/Ashbourne, Walterstown, 7/10/2001,
- Drumree w/o, scr St. Paul's,
- Carnaross w/o, scr St. Colmcille's,

=== Group B ===
Team	Pld	W	L	D	PF	PA	PD	Pts
Castletown	7	6	1	0	91	74	+17	12
Ballivor	7	5	2	0	120	57	+63	10
St. Ultan's	7	4	2	1	96	73	+23	9
Na Fianna	7	4	2	1	75	78	-3	9
Drumconrath	7	3	4	0	49*	61*	-4	6
Rathkenny	7	3	4	0	82	87	-5	6
Moynalvey	7	2	5	0	56**	68**	-20*	4
Moynalty	7	0	7	0	39*	103*	-64*	0

Round 1:

- Drumconrath 2-8, 0-8 Rathkenny, Castletown, 20/4/2001,
- Na Fianna 1-10, 2-4 Castletown, Athboy, 22/4/2001,
- St. Ultan's 4-16, 1-9 Moynalty, Kilberry, 22/4/2001,
- Ballivor 4-15, 1-10 Moynalvey, Summerhill, 24/4/2001,

Round 2:

- Castletown 3-8, 1-13 Moynalvey, Dunderry, 13/5/2001,
- Ballivor 0-14, 3-2 Drumconrath, Martry, 13/5/2001,
- St. Ultan's 1-10, 0-5 Rathkenny, Kilberry, 4/5/2001,
- Na Fianna 1-15, 1-5 Moynalty, Athboy, 5/5/2001,

Round 3:

- Rathkenny 2-8, 2-6 Na Fianna, Kilmessan, 13/5/2001,
- Castletown 0-12, 1-6 Moynalty, Carlanstown, 27/5/2001,
- St. Ultan's 0-6, 0-5 Ballivor, Athboy, 1/6/2001,
- Drumconrath +8, -8 Moynalvey, Walterstown, 1/6/2001,

Round 4:

- Castletown 1-8, 0-8 Rathkenny, Syddan 7/6/2001,
- Ballivor 4-9, 0-3 Na Fianna, Longwood, 10/6/2001,
- St. Ultan's 0-9, 0-8 Drumconrath, Kells, 10/6/2001,
- Moynalvey w, l Moynalty, Pairc Tailteann, 10/6/2001,

Round 5:

- Rathkenny 1-22, 0-5 Moynalty, Nobber, 29/6/2001,
- Na Fianna 3-6, 0-11 Drumconrath, Athboy, 1/7/2001,
- Castletown 1-10, 1-9 Ballivor, Kilmessan, 1/7/2001,
- Moynalvey 2-10, 1-12 St. Ultan's, Kilmessan, 1/7/2001,

Round 6:

- Castletown 3-6, 0-5 Drumconrath, Nobber, 14/7/2001,
- St. Ultan's 1-11, 0-14 Na Fianna, Trim, 21/7/2001,
- Ballivor 0-20, 0-5 Moynalty, Kells, 21/7/2001,
- Rathkenny 2-9, 1-8 Moynalvey, Dunsany, 22/7/2001,

Round 7:

- Drumconrath w/o, scr Moynalty, Nobber, 14/8/2011,
- Castletown 0-13, 0-11 St. Ultan's, Carlanstown, 19/8/2001,
- Na Fianna w/o, scr Moynalvey, Summerhill, 19/8/2001,
- Ballivor 2-15, 1-4 Rathkenny, Bective, 19/8/2001,

== Knock-out Stages ==
=== Finals ===
The teams in the quarter-finals are the second placed teams from each group and one group winner. The teams in the semi-finals are two group winners and the quarter-final winners.

Semi-finals
1	Duleek	0-14
4	Ballivor	2-11
3	Castletown	0-5
2	Blackhall Gaels	3-12

Final
Ballivor	0-12
Blackhall Gaels	1-10

Semi-final:

- Blackhall Gaels 1-10, 0-13 Castletown, Pairc Tailteann, 20/10/2001,
- Ballivor 2-11, 0-14 Duleek, Dunsany, 21/10/2001,

Semi-final Replay:

- Blackhall Gaels 3-12, 0-5 Castletown, Pairc Tailteann, 28/10/2001,

Final:

- Blackhall Gaels 1-10, 0-12 Ballivor, Pairc Tailteann, 4/11/2001,
