= 1998 Meath Intermediate Football Championship =

Meath I.F.C.
- Season: 1998
- Champions: Blackhall Gaels; 1st Intermediate Football Championship title
- Relegated: ???

The 1998 Meath Intermediate Football Championship is the 72nd edition of the Meath GAA's premier club Gaelic football tournament for intermediate graded teams in County Meath, Ireland. The tournament consists of 16 teams, with the winner going on to represent Meath in the Leinster Intermediate Club Football Championship. The championship starts with a group stage and then progresses to a knock out stage.

Bective were promoted after claiming the 1997 Meath Junior Football Championship title. This was their first ever period as an Intermediate club since being founded in

On 5 October 1998, Blackhall Gaels claimed their 1st Intermediate championship title after just 4 years of existence as a club when they defeated ??? 3-14 to 1-6 in the final at Pairc Tailteann.

== Team changes ==
The following teams have changed division since the 1997 championship season.

=== From I.F.C. ===
Promoted to S.F.C.

- Dunshaughlin - (Intermediate Champions)

Regraded to 1998 J.A.F.C.

- None

=== To I.F.C. ===
Regraded from S.F.C.

- None

Promoted from J.A.F.C.

- Drumconrath - (Junior 'A' Champions)

== Group stage ==
There are 3 groups called Group A, B and C. The 2 top finishers in Group A and B will qualify for the semi-finals. First place in Group C and runners up in each group qualify for the quarter-finals. In the event of two teams being level on points and only one qualification spot available, a playoff will be conducted to determine final placings.

=== Group A ===
| Team | Pld | W | L | D | PF | PA | PD | Pts |
|---|---|---|---|---|---|---|---|---|
| Drumconrath | 7 | 4 | 0 | 3 | 0 | 0 | +0 | 11 |
| St. Patrick's | 7 | 5 | 1 | 1 | 0 | 0 | +0 | 11 |
| Syddan | 7 | 0 | 0 | 0 | 0 | 0 | +0 | 0 |
| St. Brigid's Ballinacree | 7 | 0 | 0 | 0 | 0 | 0 | +0 | 0 |
| Rathkenny | 7 | 0 | 0 | 0 | 0 | 0 | +0 | 0 |
| Duleek | 7 | 2 | 4 | 1 | 0 | 0 | +0 | 5 |
| St. Colmcille's | 7 | 4 | 2 | 1 | 0 | 0 | +0 | 9 |
| Moynalty | 7 | 0 | 0 | 0 | 0 | 0 | +0 | 0 |

Round 1:

- St. Patrick's 0-10, 0-5 St. Colmcille's, Bellewstown, 5/4/1998,
- Syddan 1-17, 2-8 St. Brigid's, Carlanstown, 5/4/1998,
- Drumconrath 1-9, 2-6 Moynalty, Carlanstown, 11/4/1998,
- Rathkenny 2-6, 0-10 Duleek, Seneschalstown, 11/4/1998,

Round 2:

- St. Colmcille's 2-6, 0-7 St. Brigid's, Kilberry, 19/4/1998,
- St. Patrick's 1-10, 1-10 Duleek, Bellewstown, 19/4/1998,
- Rathkenny 3-16, 0-8 Moynalty, Carlanstown, 18/4/1998,
- Drumconrath 1-7, 0-9 Syddan, Meath Hill, 25/4/1998,

Round 3:

- St. Colmcille's 1-9, 0-12 Drumconrath, Rathkenny, 17/5/1998,
- Duleek 1-9, 0-8 Moynalty, Kilberry, 17/5/1998,
- St. Patrick's 3-17, 0-6 St. Brigid's, Kilberry, 6/6/1998,
- Rathkenny 3-9, 2-9 Syddan, Castletown, 6/6/1998,

Round 4:

- Rathkenny 3-7, 0-9 St. Colmcille's, Seneschalstown, 4/7/1998,
- Drumconrath 0-16, 0-13 St. Patrick's, Walterstown, 4/7/1998,
- Duleek 3-18, 0-10 St. Brigid's, Martry, 5/7/1998,
- Syddan 1-12, 0-6 Moynalty, Carlanstown, 12/7/1998,

Round 5:

- St. Colmcille's 4-12, 2-6 Moynalty, Rathkenny, 19/7/1998,
- Drumconrath w/o, scr St. Brigid's, Carnaross, 19/7/1998,
- Syddan 2-13, 2-10 Duleek, Seneschalstown, 16/8/1998,
- St. Patrick's 1-17, 0-8 Rathkenny, Seneschalstown, 16/8/1998,

Round 6:

- St. Colmcille's 1-11, 0-12 Syddan, Slane, 23/8/1998,
- Drumconrath 0-15, 0-4 Duleek, Slane, 23/8/1998,
- St. Patrick's 3-25, 1-5 Moynalty, Seneschalstown, 23/8/1998,
- Rathkenny w/o, scr St. Brigid's,

Round 7:

- St. Patrick's 4-11, 0-7 Syddan, Donore, 30/8/1998,
- Drumconrath 0-9, 1-6 Rathkenny, Castletown, 30/8/1998,
- St. Colmcille's w/o, scr Duleek,
- Moynalty w/o, scr St. Brigid's,

Quarter-final Playoffs:

- Drumconrath 0-9, 0-7 Rathkenny, Castletown, 6/9/1998,
- St. Patrick's 0-14, 1-8 Rathkenny, Walterstown, 13/9/1998,

=== Group B ===
| Team | Pld | W | L | D | PF | PA | PD | Pts |
|---|---|---|---|---|---|---|---|---|
| Blackhall Gaels | 6 | 0 | 0 | 0 | 0 | 0 | +0 | 0 |
| Castletown | 6 | 0 | 0 | 0 | 0 | 0 | +0 | 0 |
| Ballivor | 6 | 0 | 0 | 0 | 0 | 0 | +0 | 0 |
| Donaghmore/Ashbourne | 6 | 0 | 0 | 0 | 0 | 0 | +0 | 0 |
| Ballinabrackey | 6 | 0 | 0 | 0 | 0 | 0 | +0 | 0 |
| Bective | 6 | 0 | 0 | 0 | 0 | 0 | +0 | 0 |
| St. Ultan's | 6 | 0 | 0 | 0 | 0 | 0 | +0 | 0 |

Round 1:

- Ballivor 3-12, 1-9 Bective, Martry, 4/4/1998,
- St. Ultan's 3-9, 1-4 Ballinabrackey, Longwood, 12/4/1998,
- Castletown 1-12, 0-10 Blackhall Gaels, Dunderry, 12/4/1998,
- Donaghmore/Ashbourne - Bye,

Round 2:

- Castletown 0-11, 0-9 Donaghmore/Ashbourne, Skryne, 19/4/1998,
- Blackhall Gaels 2-14, 1-4 St. Ultan's, Kilmessan, 19/4/1998,
- Ballinabrackey 2-10, 0-15 Bective, Summerhill, 3/5/1998,
- Ballivor - Bye,

Round 3:

- Castletown w, l St. Ultan's, Kells, 17/5/1998,
- Blackhall Gaels 2-13, 2-9 Bective, Kilmessan, 5/6/1998,
- Ballivor 0-12, 0-8 Donaghmore/Ashbourne, Kilmessan, 6/6/1998,
- Ballinabrackey - Bye,

Round 4:

- Castletown 1-7, 0-10 Ballivor, Pairc Tailteann, 4/7/1998,
- Bective 1-10, 0-10 St. Ultan's, Dunderry, 4/7/1998,
- Donaghmore/Ashbourne 1-17, 1-9 Ballinabrackey, Trim, 5/7/1998,
- Blackhall Gaels - Bye,

Round 5:

- Castletown 3-15, 0-4 Bective, Kilberry, 17/7/1998,
- Blackhall Gaels 1-12, 1-4 Donaghmore/Ashbourne, Walterstown, 16/8/1998,
- Ballivor 0-12, 0-2 Ballinabrackey, Longwood, 16/8/1998,
- St. Ultan's - Bye,

Round 6:

- Donaghmore/Ashbourne 1-11, 1-8 St. Ultan's, Seneschalstown, 23/8/1998,
- Castletown 2-22, 1-5 Ballinabrackey, Dunderry, 23/8/1998,
- Blackhall Gaels 3-9, 0-9 Ballivor, Trim, 30/8/1998,
- Bective - Bye,

Round 7:

- Blackhall Gaels w/o, scr Ballinabrackey, Summerhill, 5/9/1998,
- Ballivor w, l St. Ultan's,
- Donaghmore/Ashbourne w, l Bective,
- Castletown - Bye,

== Knock-out Stages ==
=== Finals ===
The teams in the semi-finals are Group A and B winners along with the runners-up.

Semi-finals
St. Patrick's | 0-14
Castletown | 0-12
Drumconrath | 0-11 (R)
Blackhall Gaels | 1-12 (R)

Final
St. Patrick's | 1-8
Blackhall Gaels | 0-12

Semi-final:

- Blackhall Gaels 0-13, 1-10 Drumconrath, Walterstown, 20/9/1998,
- St. Patrick's 0-14, 0-12 Castletown, Walterstown, 20/9/1998,

Semi-final Replay:

- Blackhall Gaels 1-12, 0-11 Drumconrath, Walterstown, 27/9/1998,

Final:

- Blackhall Gaels 0-12, 1-8 St. Patrick's, Pairc Tailteann, 20/9/1998,
