= 2002 Meath Intermediate Football Championship =

Meath I.F.C.
- Season: 2002
- Champions: Ballivor; 4th Intermediate Football Championship title
- Relegated: Moynalvey

The 2002 Meath Intermediate Football Championship is the 76th edition of the Meath GAA's premier club Gaelic football tournament for intermediate graded teams in County Meath, Ireland. The tournament consists of 16 teams, with the winner going on to represent Meath in the Leinster Intermediate Club Football Championship. The championship starts with a group stage and then progresses to a knock out stage.

This was Navan O'Mahonys first year in this grade since 1956, after 45 years in the Senior grade since being relegated in 2001. Skryne and Trim were the only clubs to have operated at senior level for longer. This was also Syddan's first year in this grade since 1999, after 2 years in the Senior grade since being relegated in 2001.

Curraha were promoted after claiming the 2001 Meath Junior Football Championship title, their first year in the intermediate grade since being relegated in the late 1970s and their 3rd ever period at this level.

On 27 October 2002, Ballivor claimed their 4th Intermediate championship title when they defeated Navan O'Mahonys 2-5 to 0-10.

Moynalvey were relegated after 3 years as an Intermediate club, since being relegated from the senior grade.

== Team changes ==
The following teams have changed division since the 2001 championship season.

=== From I.F.C. ===
Promoted to S.F.C.

- Blackhall Gaels - (Intermediate Champions)

Relegated to J.A.F.C.

- Moynalty

=== To I.F.C. ===
Relegted from S.F.C.

- Navan O'Mahonys
- Syddan

Promoted from J.A.F.C.

- Curraha - (Junior 'A' Champions)

== Group stage ==
There are 2 groups called Group A and B. The 2 top finishers in each Group will qualify for the semi-finals. The teams that finish last in their groups will be relegated. In the event of two teams being level on points and only one qualification spot available, a playoff will be conducted to determine final placings.

=== Group A ===
Team	Pld	W	L	D	PF	PA	PD	Pts
Duleek	7	6	1	0	100	75	+25	12
Slane	7	5	2	0	90	68	+22	10
Carnaross	7	5	2	0	98	81	+17	10
St. Colmcille's	7	4	3	0	87	72	+15	8
Castletown	7	3	4	0	59	64	-5	6
Rathkenny	7	3	4	0	68	81	-13	6
Curraha	7	2	5	0	56	80	-24	4
Drumconrath	7	1	6	0	52	88	-36	2

Round 1:

- Castletown 0-6, 0-2 Rathkenny,
- Slane 2-6, 1-8 St. Colmcille's,
- Duleek 0-12, 1-5 Curraha,
- Carnaross 0-11, 0-9 Drumconrath,

Round 2:

- Rathkenny 0-10, 1-6 Slane,
- Carnaross 1-7, 1-5 St. Colmcille's,
- Duleek 0-17, 0-4 Drumconrath,
- Castletown 0-4, 0-3 Curraha,

Round 3:

- Slane 2-8, 1-6 Castletown,
- Carnaross 2-17, 1-7 Rathkenny,
- Duleek 1-11, 1-9 St. Colmcille's,
- Curraha 1-8, 0-5 Drumconrath,

Round 4:

- Drumconrath 0-9, 0-8 Castletown,
- St. Colmcille's 2-13, 1-9 Curraha,
- Rathkenny 3-9, 0-10 Duleek,
- Slane 0-14, 2-6 Carnaross,

Round 5:

- St. Colmcille's 0-15, 0-8 Drumconrath,
- Carnaross 2-8, 1-10 Castletown,
- Curraha 0-11, 0-10 Rathkenny,
- Duleek 1-10, 1-7 Slane,

Round 6:

- Duleek 2-15, 2-8 Carnaross,
- Rathkenny 2-5, 0-9 Drumconrath,
- Castletown 1-7, 0-9 St. Colmcille's,
- Slane 1-13, 0-5 Curraha,

Round 7:

- Carnaross 1-11, 0-6 Curraha,
- Duleek 0-13, 1-6 Castletown,
- Slane 1-12, 1-5 Drumconrath,
- St. Colmcille's 1-10, 0-7 Rathkenny,

Quarter-final Playoff:

- Slane 1-11, 1-9 Carnaross,

=== Group B ===
Team	Pld	W	L	D	PF	PA	PD	Pts
Ballivor	7	6	0	1	127	71	+56	13
Navan O'Mahonys	7	5	1	1	92	75	+17	11
Syddan	7	4	3	0	99	98	+1	8
Drumree	7	3	3	1	96	99	-3	7
Donaghmore/Ashbourne	7	3	3	1	72	91	-19	7
Na Fianna	7	3	4	0	92	94	-2	6
St. Ultan's	7	2	5	0	91	100	-9	4
Moynalvey	7	1	6	0	82	121	-39	2

Round 1:

- Ballivor 1-12, 2-4 Drumree,
- Na Fianna 2-6, 2-5 Navan O'Mahonys,
- Donaghmore/Ashbourne 1-8, 0-10 Moynalvey,
- Syddan 2-12, 1-12 St. Ultan's,

Round 2:

- Syddan 0-11, 0-5 Navan O'Mahonys,
- Ballivor 1-13, 2-7 Na Fianna,
- St. Ultan's 0-16, 3-5 Moynalvey,
- Drumree 1-9, 0-12 Donaghmore/Ashbourne,

Round 3:

- Drumree 3-12, 1-8 Moynalvey,
- Ballivor 3-15, 0-9 Syddan,
- Na Fianna 1-8, 0-10 Donaghmore/Ashbourne,
- Navan O'Mahony's 0-13, 0-8 St. Ultan's,

Round 4:

- Donaghmore/Ashbourne 0-11, 0-9 Syddan,
- Ballivor 2-8, 2-6 St. Ultan's,
- Navan O'Mahony's 3-11, 0-7 Moynalvey,
- Na Fianna 2-11, 2-9 Drumree,

Round 5:

- Na Fianna 0-12, 2-9 Moynalvey,
- Drumree 1-8, 0-10 Syddan,
- Ballivor 0-12, 2-6 Navan O'Mahonys,
- Donaghmore/Ashbourne 1-11, 1-8 St. Ultan's,

Round 6:

- Navan O'Mahonys 1-9, 0-7 Donaghmore/Ashbourne,
- Syddan 2-15, 3-7 Na Fianna,
- Drumree 2-13, 1-12 St. Ultan's,
- Ballivor 2-14, 1-5 Moynalvey,

Round 7:

- Syddan 2-15, 2-10 Moynalvey,
- St Ultans 1-11, 2-5 Na Fianna,
- Ballivor 3-17, 1-4 Donaghmore/Ashbourne,
- Navan O'Mahonys 2-13, 0-8 Drumree,

== Knock-out Stage ==
=== Relegation Play Off ===
The two bottom finishers from the group stage qualify for the relegation final.

Relegation Final:

- Drumconrath 1-12, 1-9 Moynalvey, Simonstown, 13/10/2002,

=== Finals ===
The teams in the quarter-finals are the second placed teams from each group and one group winner. The teams in the semi-finals are two group winners and the quarter-final winners.

Semi-finals
1	Duleek	1-9
4	Navan O'Mahonys	1-13
3	Ballivor	1-11
2	Slane	0-12

Final
Navan O'Mahonys	0-5
Ballivor	2-5

Semi-finals:

- Navan O'Mahonys 1-13, 1-9 Duleek, Pairc Tailteann, 13/10/2002,
- Ballivor 1-11, 0-12 Slane, Pairc Tailteann, 13/10/2002,

Final:

- Ballivor 2-5, 0-5 Navan O'Mahonys, Pairc Tailteann, 27/10/2002,
