= Anthony Moyles =

Irish Gaelic footballer and manager

Personal information
- Native name: Antóin Maolmhuire (Irish)
- Born: 16 November 1976 (age 49) Dunboyne, County Meath
- Height: 6 ft 3 in (191 cm)

Sport
- Sport: Gaelic football
- Position: Midfield
Clubs
- Years: Club
- 1998–2002 2002–2009 2009–2012 2013-: St Pauls; Blackhall Gaels; St Oliver Plunketts/Eoghan Ruadh; St Pauls
Club titles
- Meath titles: 1
- Leinster titles: 1
- All-Ireland Titles: 0
Inter-county
Years	County	Apps (scores)
2000-2011	Meath	83 (3-11)
Inter-county titles
- Leinster titles: 1
Club management
- Years: Club
- 2015-: Dunsaughlin
		–	–

Anthony Moyles (born 16 November 1976) is an Irish Gaelic football coach and former player who currently manages Kilbride G.F.Cin the Meath Senior Football Championship. Moyles originally played for local club St Pauls in the Junior Championship and was on a team that earned promotion to the Intermediate division. In 2002 he transferred to Blackhall Gaels with whom he won his first Meath |Senior Championship title in 2003. Between late 2008 and early 2009 Moyles moved to St Oliver Plunketts/Eoghan Ruadh, a top level team in Dublin.

== Meath ==
Moyles has been a member of the Meath panel since 2000. He was named as the captain for 2007 which turned to a successful year for him and his panel. He played as a back for Meath in the controversial 2010 Leinster Senior Football Championship Final against Louth, which Meath won by two points giving Moyles his first Leinster title.

== Managerial career ==
In December 2015 Moyles was appointed the Dunshaughlin manager, taking over from Kit Henry.

== Honours ==
- 1 Meath Senior Football Championship 2003
- 1 Leinster Senior Football Championship 2010
- 1 National Football League Division 2 2007 (C)

Preceded by	Meath Senior Football Captain; 2007	Succeeded by Brendan Murphy
