= St Brigid's GFC (Meath) =

Gaelic sports club in County Meath, Ireland

St Brigid's
- Naomh Bride
- Founded: 1962
- County: Meath
- Colours
- Grounds: St Brigid's GAA Club

Playing kits
Standard colours

Senior Club Championships
	All Ireland	Leinster champions	Meath champions
Football:	0	0	0

St Brigid's GFC is a Gaelic Athletic Association club in Ballinacree, County Meath, Ireland. The club is affiliated to the Meath County Board and fields teams primarily in Gaelic football.

== History ==
Located in Ballinacree, approximately 5 km from Oldcastle, St Brigid's GFC was founded in 1962. St Brigid's won the Meath JFC once in 1994, defeating Baconstown 2–12 to 2-08. St Brigid's have also won the Meath JBFC twice, while also competing in another final. They first played Boardsmill in the 2005 JBFC final, losing by 1 point. They went on to win the Meath JBFC the following year, beating Clonard 1–07 to 0-06. They also won the JBFC in 2022, defeating Slane by 15 points.

As of 2026, St Brigid's compete in the Meath JFC.

== Honours ==
- Meath Junior 'A' Football Championship (1): 1994
- Meath Junior 'B' Football Championship (1): 2006, 2022 (runners-up in 2005)

Preceded by Cortown	Meath Junior Football Champions; 1994	Succeeded by Duleek
