= Dunshaughlin GAA =

Gaelic games club in County Meath, Ireland

Dunshaughlin & Royal Gaels
- Domhnach Seachnaill agus Gaeil Ríoga
- Founded: 1886
- County: Meath
- Colours: Black and Yellow
- Grounds: Drumree Road
- Coordinates: 53°30′54″N 6°33′00″W

Playing kits
Standard colours

Senior Club Championships
	All Ireland	Leinster champions	Meath champions
Football:	0	1	4
Hurling:	0	0	3

Dunshaughlin & Royal Gaels GAA is a Gaelic Athletic Association club based in the town of Dunshaughlin, in County Meath, Ireland. The club competes at intermediate level in the Football championship. Formed in 1886, it is one of the oldest still-active clubs in Meath.

== History ==
The first reported game was against Ross on 30 January 1987 which St. Seachnall’s won by 1-2 to 0-0. The club has since won many championships at Junior and Intermediate level.

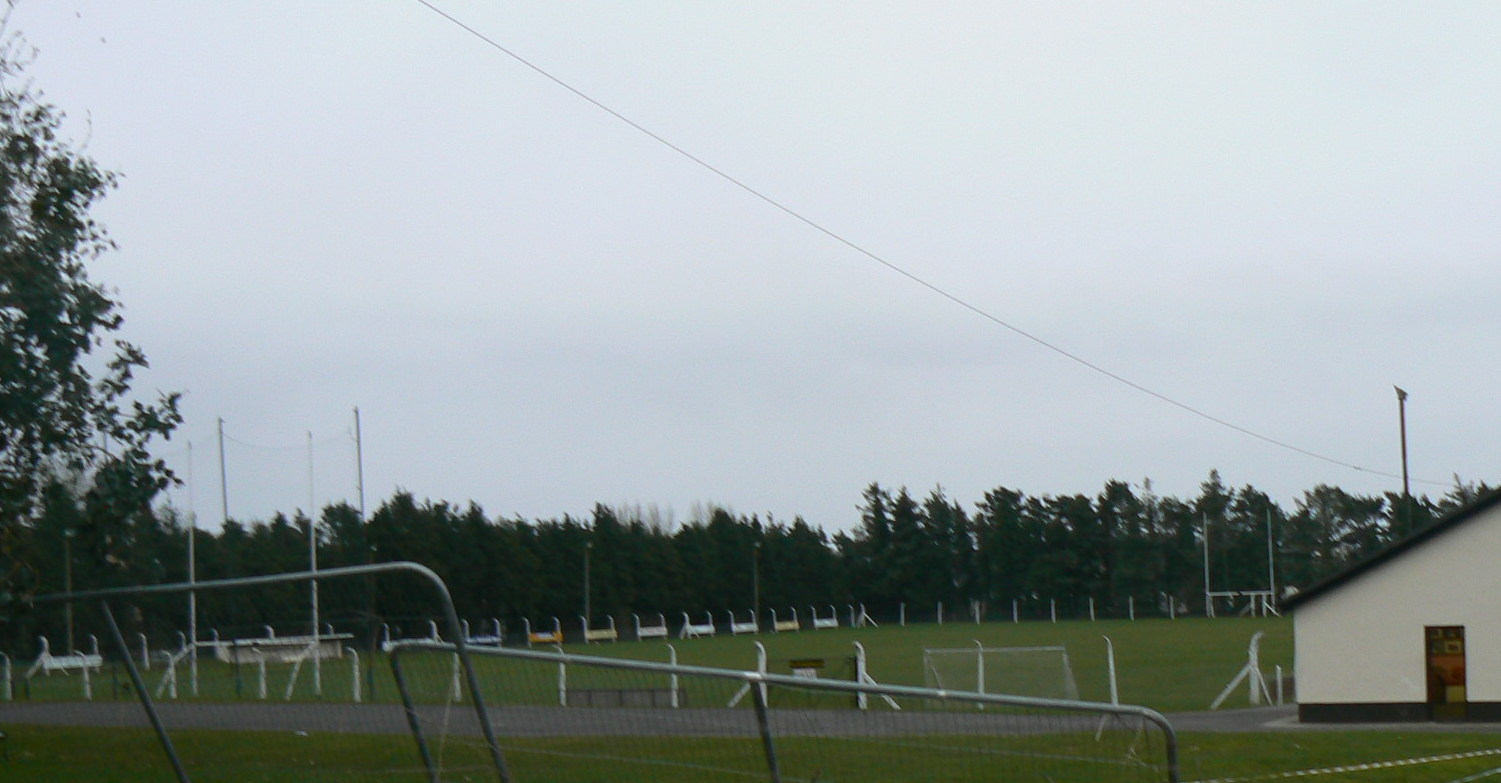
Dunshaughlin grounds in 2010

The club was initially a hurling club and maintained its roots in the game until the 1980s.

In 2010, Dunshaughlin's senior team lost by a point against Summerhill in the Meath Senior Football Championship final.

== Honours ==
- Meath Senior Football Championship (4): 2000, 2001, 2002, 2024
- Meath Senior Hurling Championship (3): 1909, 1910, 1923
- Leinster Senior Club Football Championship (1): 2002
- Meath Intermediate Football Championship (3): 1977, 1997, 2022
- Meath Junior Football Championship (3): 1928, 1950, 1958
- Meath Junior B Football Championship (3): 1958, 1994, 2012

Preceded by Dunshaughlin	Meath Senior Football Champions; 2002	Succeeded by Blackhall Gaels

Preceded by Kilmessan	Meath Senior Hurling Champions; 1923	Succeeded by Athboy
