= Oldcastle GAA =

Gaelic games club in County Meath, Ireland

Oldcastle
- Sean Chaisleán
- Founded: 1884
- County: Meath
- Colours: Blue & White
- Grounds: Millbrook

Playing kits
Standard colours

Senior Club Championships
	All Ireland	Leinster champions	Meath champions
Football:	-	-	0
Hurling:	-	-	0

Oldcastle GAA is a Gaelic Athletic Association club based in the town of Oldcastle, in County Meath, Ireland. The club plays Gaelic Football and competes in Meath GAA competitions. In 1945 and 1998 the team reached the Meath Senior Football Championship final.

== Honours ==
- Meath Senior Football Championship Winners: 0
  - 1945, 1998 1980 1992 1983
- Meath Intermediate Football Championship Winners: 2
  - 1987, 2009
- Meath Junior Football Championship Winners: 3
  - 1937, 1944, 1956
