= Yellow Furze =

Village in County Meath, Ireland

Yellow Furze An Aitinn Bhuí
- Village
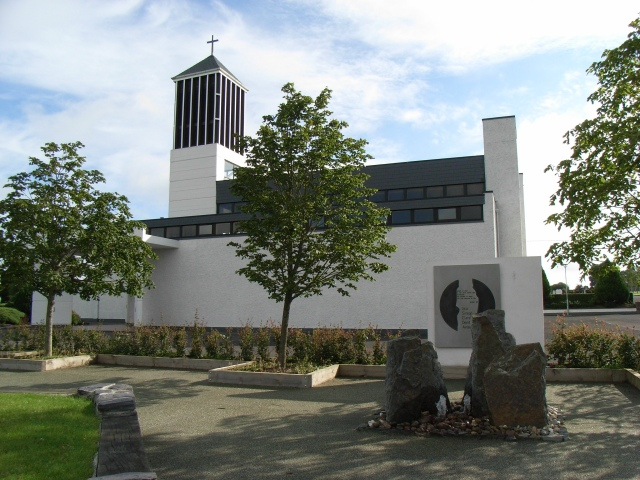
- Church of the Assumption, Yellow Furze

- Location in Ireland
- Coordinates: 53°40′N 6°34′W
- Country: Ireland
- Province: Leinster
- County: County Meath
- Time zone: UTC+0 (WET)
  - Summer (DST): UTC-1 (IST (WEST))

Yellow Furze (Irish: an Aitinn Bhuí, meaning 'small yellow place') is a small village in County Meath, Ireland. It is located 5 km southwest of Slane, on the boundary between the townlands of Dollardstown (Baile an Dolardaigh) and Seneschalstown (Baile an tSeanascail).

Yellow Furze is in the Catholic parish of Beauparc, which extends over an area on the south side of the River Boyne between Navan and Slane. The village church is the Church of the Assumption and there is a cemetery next to it.

== Popular culture ==
The song "Yellow Furze Woman" appeared on Christy Moore's 1993 album King Puck.

== See also ==
- List of towns and villages in Ireland
