= Dunderry =

Village in County Meath, Ireland

Dunderry Dún Doire
- Village
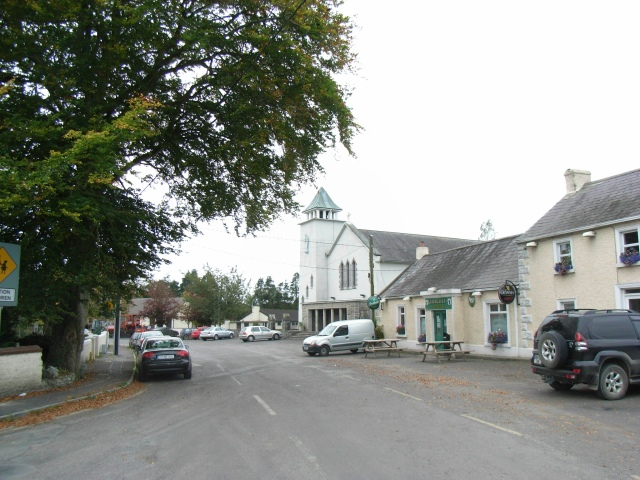

- Location in Ireland
- Coordinates: 53°36′28″N 6°46′24″W
- Country: Ireland
- Province: Leinster
- County: County Meath

Population (2016)
  - Total: 170

Dunderry (Irish: Dún Doire) is a village and townland in County Meath, Ireland, about 8 kilometres (5 mi) south-west of Navan. The village population was 170 at the 2016 census. The local Gaelic games club, Dunderry GAA Club, was formed in 1890 and competes in football, hurling, camogie and rounders. The 18th-century Dunderry Park estate (formerly Philpotstown House) is 2 km (1.2 mi) north-east of the village.
