= St Peter's GAA (Meath) =

Gaelic games club in County Meath, Ireland

St Peters GAA Dunboyne
- Toghroinn Pheadair
- Founded: 1902
- County: Meath
- Colours: Yellow and Black
- Grounds: Rooske Road

Playing kits
Standard colours

Senior Club Championships
	All Ireland	Leinster champions	Meath champions
Football:	0	0	3
Hurling:	0	0	5
Ladies' football:	0	1	?

St Peters, Dunboyne is a Gaelic Athletic Association club based in the town of Dunboyne, in County Meath, Ireland. The club competes at senior level in Gaelic football, hurling, camogie and Ladies football in Meath GAA competitions. Founded in 1902, the club originally only played hurling but started to play organised games of Gaelic football in the late 1940s.

== Honours ==
- Meath Senior Football Championship (3): 1998, 2005, 2018
- Meath Senior Hurling Championship (5): 1908, 1911, 1912, 1913, 1914
- Meath Intermediate Football Championship (2): 1952, 1992
- Meath Intermediate Hurling Championship (5): 1962, 1980, 1986, 1989, 1999
- Meath Junior Football Championship (3): 1962, 1989, 2018
- Meath Junior Hurling Championship (4): 1935, 1963, 2004, 2006

== Notable players ==
- Andy McEntee, All-Ireland winner with Meath senior football team and later Meath senior football manager
- Shane McEntee
- David Gallagher, All-Ireland winner with Meath senior football team
- David Geaney, Munster football medal with Kerry senior football team
- Brendan Reilly, All-Ireland winner with Meath senior football team
- Seán Boylan, manager of Meath senior football team, four-time All-Ireland winner
