= Robinstown, County Meath =

Village in County Meath, Ireland

Robinstown Baile Roibín
- Village
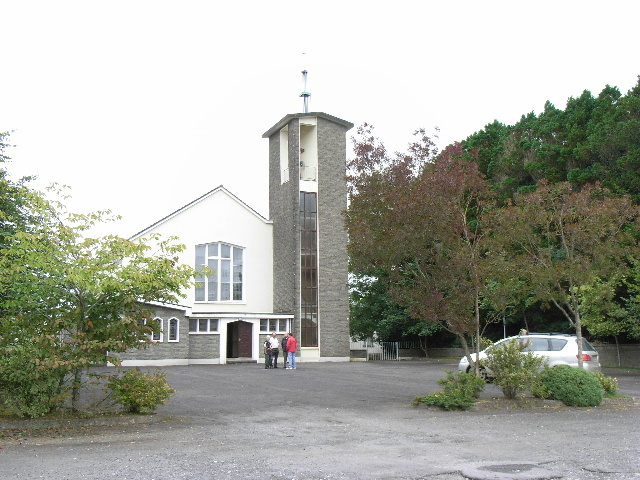
- Robinstown's Catholic church

- Location in Ireland
- Coordinates: 53°35′40″N 6°43′39″W
- Country: Ireland
- Province: Leinster
- County: County Meath

Population (2016)
  - Total: 374
- Time zone: UTC+0 (WET)
  - Summer (DST): UTC-1 (IST (WEST))
- Irish Grid Reference: N842612

Robinstown (Irish: Baile Roibín), in the townland of Balbradagh (Irish: An Baile Bradach), is a village in County Meath, Ireland.

As of the 2016 census, the village (known for census purposes as Balbradagh) had a population of 374 people. The local national (primary) school, Robinstown National School, had an enrollment of over 180 pupils as of 2014.

Robinstown Roman Catholic church (built c. 1970) is in the parish of Dunderry, and is listed on the Record of Protected Structures for County Meath. Archaeological sites in the area include a ringfort site to the west of the village in Balbradagh townland.
