= Meath Junior Football Championship =

Annual Gaelic football competition

- Founded: 1897 –
- Trophy: Peter McDermott Cup
- Title holders: Curraha (5th title)
- Most titles: Martry (6 titles)
- Sponsors: Balreask Bar and Restaurant

The Meath Junior Football Championship is an annual Gaelic football competition contested by lower-tier Meath GAA clubs. The winner of this championship will be promoted to the Intermediate division. The winner also represents Meath in the Leinster Junior Club Football Championship. The 2026 Meath Junior Football Championship was won by Curraha, who defeated Ballinlough in the final 3–15 to 1–12.

== Competition format ==
Up until 1971, the Junior 'A' winners played against the Junior 'B' winners in the Junior Championship final, even though the teams involved in the final had played in different grades of football throughout the season.

From 2020 onwards, club reserve teams were not permitted to take part in the Junior Football Championship. The Junior 'B' Championship was abolished (with all first teams automatically promoted from it) and a separate Premier Football Championship for reserve teams was established. The Junior 'B' championship was reinstated in 2022.

== History ==
Wolfe Tones went from this competition to Meath Senior Football Championship winners in the space of four seasons in the early 21st-century, featuring Meath player Cian Ward, whose emergence as one of Meath's "most exciting talents" coincided with this run, while 1996 All-Ireland Senior Football Championship-winning captain Tommy Dowd also joined the club around this time.

== Qualification for subsequent competitions ==
=== Meath Junior Club Football Championship ===
The Meath JFC winners qualify for the Leinster Junior Club Football Championship. It is the only team from County Meath to qualify for this competition. The Meath JFC winners enter the Leinster Junior Club Football Championship at the __ stage. For example, 2019 winner Clann na nGael played in the Leinster JFC final, losing the game by a single point.

While 2015 winner Curraha won the Leinster JFC final.

Meath JFC winning clubs also put together a five-year continuous sequence of Leinster titles in the 21st-century, as follows: Clann na nGael (2007), Moynalvey (2008), Longwood (2009), Ballinabrackey (2010) and Ballivor (2011).

This followed a similar, earlier, three-in-a-row sequence of Meath JFC winners of corresponding Leinster titles, as follows: Nobber (2002), Wolfe Tones (2003) and Ratoath (2004).

=== All-Ireland Junior Club Football Championship ===
The Meath JFC winners — by winning the Leinster Junior Club Football Championship — may qualify for the All-Ireland Junior Club Football Championship, at which they would enter at the __ stage, providing they haven't been drawn to face the British champions in the quarter-finals.

The Meath JFC winning club representative won consecutive All-Ireland titles in the early 21st-century as follows: Nobber in 2003 and Wolfe Tones in 2004.

== Meath Junior 'A' Football Championship ==
=== Meath Junior 'A' Football Championship top winners ===
Teams in bold are still currently in existence as football clubs.

Club	Titles	Years won
Martry	6	1907, 1915, 1920, 1930, 1943, 1964
**Curraha**	5	1941, 1976, 2001, 2015, 2026
**Ballinabrackey**	5	1926, 1972, 1977, 1985, 2010
**Carnaross**	4	1921, 1945, 1951, 1991
**Clann na nGael**	3	2007, 2019, 2025
**St Peter's Dunboyne**	3	1962, 1989, 2018
**Meath Hill**	3	1942, 1980, 2017
**Ratoath**	3	1970, 2004, 2012
**Drumconrath**	3	1928, 1963, 1996
Duleek	3	1921, 1935, 1995
**Summerhill**	3	1931, 1953, 1975
**Dunshaughlin**	3	1928, 1950, 1958
**Oldcastle**	3	1937, 1944, 1956
Kells	3	1917, 1922, 1951.
De la Salle (Navan)	3	1932, 1933, 1938
**Kilbride**	2	1960, 2023
**Bective**	2	1997, 2016
**Cortown**	2	1993, 2014
Donaghmore	2	1924, 1971
Drumree	2	1959, 1998
Kilcoon	2	1925, 1973
**Longwood**	2	1939, 2009
**Moynalvey**	2	1981, 2008
Navan Gaels	2	1905, 1906
**Navan O'Mahony's**	2	1949, 1974
**Nobber**	2	1946, 2002
**Rathkenny**	2	1916, 1984
**Slane**	2	1918, 1952
**St Michael's**	2	1982, 2005
**Gaeil Colmcille**	2	1966, 1992
**St Ultan's**	2	2000, 2006
**Trim**	2	1934, 1940
**Walterstown**	2	1961, 1978
**St Vincent's**	2	1948, 2021
Dunsany	1	2024
Castletown	1	2022
Athboy	1	1957
**Ballinlough**	1	1988
**Ballivor**	1	2011
Bellewstown	1	1986
Bettystown	1	1908
Bohermeen	1	1965
Dulane	1	1923
Donore	1	1913
**Drumbaragh Emmets**	1	2013
Flathouse	1	1968
Fordstown	1	1965
Gormanstown	1	1945
Kells Stars	1	1911
Martinstown	1	1969
**Moynalty**	1	1987
Navan Harps	1	1909
Newtown Round Towers	1	1897
O'Growney's	1	1910
**Seneschelstown**	1	1936
**Syddan**	1	1927
**Simonstown Gaels**	1	1990
**St Brigid's**	1	1994
**St Colmcille's**	1	1983
**St Mary's**	1	1979
**St Paul's**	1	1999
**Wolfe Tones**	1	2003
Young Irelands	1	1947

=== Meath Junior Football Championship Roll of Honour ===
From the inaugural Junior B championship in 1958 until 1971, the winners of the Junior A Championship and the winners of the Junior B Championship would play in the Junior Championship final to determine promotion to the I.F.C. On many occasions, both teams were promoted.

Year	Winner	Score	Runner-up	Score
2026	Curraha	3–15	Ballinlough	1–12
2025	Clann na nGael	0–17	St. Vincent's	1–12
2024	Dunsany	1–05	St. Vincent's	0–07
2023	Kilbride	2–17	Clann na nGael	1–10
2022	Castletown	1–12	Dunsany	0–11
2021	St Vincent's	1–04	Dunsany	0–06
2020	Ballivor	0–10	St Vincent's	0–05
2019	Clann na nGael	1–08, 3–08 R	Moylagh	1–08, 1–09 R
2018	St Peter's Dunboyne 'B'	2–11	St Vincent's	1–12
2017	Meath Hill	1–12	Moylagh	0–09
2016	Bective	0–15	Dunsany	0–12
2015	Curraha	2–12	Dunsany	2–11
2014	Cortown	1–10 1–11 R	St Peter's Dunboyne 'B'	1–10 1–10 R
2013	Drumbaragh Emmets	0–12 1–13 R	Kilmainham	1–09 0–10 R
2012	Ratoath	1–11	Donaghmore/Ashbourne 'B'	1–10
2011	Ballivor	2–14	Navan O'Mahony's B	1–08
2010	Ballinabrackey	3–04	Ballivor	0–11
2009	Longwood	1–10	Dunsany	0–07
2008	Moynalvey	0–16	Ratoath	0–07
2007	Clann na nGael	1–07	Moynalvey	1–06
2006	St Ultan's	1–10	Kilmainham	1–06
2005	St Michael's	2–11	Navan O'Mahony's B	1–11
2004	Ratoath	1–08	Dunsany	0–06
2003	Wolfe Tones	2–09	Ratoath	0-05
2002	Nobber	1–15	Dunsany	2-07
2001	Curraha	1–13	Wolfe Tones	1–06
2000	St Ultan's	1–11	St Peter's Dunboyne B	0–06
1999	St Paul's	0–11	Moylagh	0–09
1998	Drumree	1–11	St Mary's	2–05
1997	Bective	0–11	Skryne B	0–09
1996	Drumconrath	1–10	Meath Hill	0–10
1995	Duleek	1–10	Drumconrath	0–10
1994	St Brigid's	2–12	Baconstown	2–08
1993	Cortown	3–15	St Peter's Dunboyne 'B'	1-09
1992	Gaeil Colmcille 'B'	2–09	Ratoath	2-06
1991	Carnaross	1–14	Drumree	0-05
1990	Simonstown Gaels	2–10	Cortown	1–10
1989	St Peter's Dunboyne	0–10, 0–10 (R)	Carnaross	1-07 1-05 (R)
1988	Ballinlough	0–12	Carnaross	2–05
1987	Moynalty	2–11	Cortown	1–05
1986	Bellewstown	0–05	Simonstown Gaels	0–04
1985	Ballinabrackey	1–03	Moynalty	0–05
1984	Rathkenny	1–09	Moynalty	0–02
1983	St Colmcille's		Moynalty	
1982	St Michael's	2-06	Seneschalstown 'B'	1-07
1981	Moynalvey	1-07	St Michael's	0-04
1980	Meath Hill	2-06	Moynalty	0-03
1979	St Mary's	2-06	Meath Hill	2-06
1978	Walterstown	1-08, 3-08 (R)	St Mary's	1-08, 0-06 (R)
1977	Ballinabrackey	3-04	Skryne 'B'	1-07
1976	Curraha	1–10	Nobber	3-01
1975	Summerhill 'B'	1-09	Drumbaragh Emmets	1-05
1974	Navan O'Mahony's 'B'	4-05	St Colmcille's	0-08
1973	Kilcoon	1-07	Gibbstown	1-04
1972	Ballinabrackey	0–11	Dunsany	2-02
1971	Donaghmore	4-04	Clonard	1-09
1970	Ratoath		Navan O'Mahony's	
1969	Martinstown	1–10	Kilcloon	1-04
1968	Flathouse	3-06	Gibbstown	0-01
1967	Dunshaughlin	5-03	Skryne	0-04
1966	Gaeil Colmcille 'B'	2-06	Summerhill	2-03
1965	Bohermeen	1-06	Oldcastle	0-04
1964	Martry	2-07	Enfield	0-05
1963	Drumconrath	1-04	Kilberry	0-06
1962	St Peter's Dunboyne 'B'	2–13	Donore 'B'	0-04
1961	Walterstown	0–10	Ratoath	0-01
1960	Kilbride	1-09	Batterstown	0-01
1959	Drumree	1–10	Longwood	0-05
1958	Dunshaughlin		Clonard	
1957	Athboy	2-03	Castletown	0-08
1956	Oldcastle	2-04	Nobber	0-04
1955	Carnaross	3-05	Curraha	0-02
1954	Fordstown	1-06, 2–03 R	Donore	2-03, 1–03 R
1953	Summerhill	1-05, 1–06 R	Drumbaragh	0-08, 1–05 R
1952	Slane	4-04	Carnaross	1-01
1951	Kells Harps	3-01	Kilberry	2-01
1950	Dunshaughlin	2-07	Carnaross	1-01
1949	Navan O'Mahony's	2-03	Drumree	1-04
1948	Ardcath		Ballinabrackey	
1947	Young Irelands Cushenstown	2-02, 2–04 R	Moynalty	1-05, 0–04 R
1946	Nobber	2-06	St Mary's	1-06
1945	Gormanstown	3-04	Ballivor	1-03
1944*	Oldcastle	0-06	Walterstown	2-06
1943	Martry	5-04	Castletown	0-06
1942	Meath Hill	3-06	Kilcloon	1-06
1941	Carnaross	3-04	Wilkinstown	0-05
1940	Trim	3-08	St Vincent's Ardcath	1-06
1939	Longwood	4-05	Ballinlough	1-01
1938	De la Salle	3-02	Ballinabrackey	1-03
1937	Oldcastle	3-04	Ballinabrackey	1-01
1936	Seneschalstown	0-04	Dunshaughlin	0-02
1935	Duleek	2-04	Tullaghanstown	0-05
1934	Trim	0-05	Oldcastle	0-02
1933*	Navan Harps	0-04, 1-05 (R)	Pluxtown	1-01 1-05 (R)
1932	De la Salle (Navan)	2-03	Rathkenny	0-02
1931	Summerhill		St Colmcille's (Kells)	
1930	Martry	1-04	Moynalty	1-03
1929	Carnaross	3-03	Curraha	0-02
1928	Drumconrath	4-06	Rathmolyon	0-02
1927	Syddan	1-05	Ardcath	0-04
1926	Ballinabrackey	3-05	Boyerstown	0-00
1925	Kilcoon	0-03	Kells	0-01
1924	Donaghmore	0-05, 3-00 (R)	Navan Harps 1-02, 0-08 (R)	
1923	Dulane	0-01, 1-00 (R), 2-04 (2R)	Walterstown	0-01, 0-03 (R), 1-02 (2R)
1922	Kells	3-03	Navan Harps 'B'	1-02
1921	Duleek	0-01	Ballinabrackey	0-00
1920	Martry	3-00	Trim Abbey Harps	0-02
1919	Enfield	0-05	Kilbeg Volunteers	0-04
1918	Slane	3-06	Athboy	1-01
1917	Kells	1-06	Ashbourne	1-03
1916	Rathkenny	0-02	Ballinlough	0-01
1915	Martry			
1914	Curraha			
1913	Donore			
1912	Carnaross		Skryne	
1911	Kells Stars	3-02	Trim Abbey Harps	1-01
1910	O'Growney's			
1909	Navan Harps			
1908	Bettystown			
1907	Martry			
1906	Navan Gaels			
1905	Navan Gaels			
1904				
1903				
1902	Julianstown			
1901				
1900				
1899				
1898				
1897	Newtown Round Towers	1-07	Carnaross St Kieran's	0-02

- In the 1944 final, Walterstown were found to have fielded players from Dublin clubs. The title was awarded to Oldcastle.
- In the 1933 final, Pluxtown were found to have fielded unregistered players from Dalystown, Westmeath. The title was awarded to Navan Harps.

=== Meath Junior 'A' F.C. Divisional Roll of Honour ===
Year	Winner	Score	Runner-up	Score
1971	Donaghmore	3-09	Boardsmill	0–11
1970	Ratoath	2-08	Cortown	0-06
1969	Martinstown	2-09	Stars of the Sea	1–11
1968	Flathouse	1-08, 3–06 R	Moylagh	1-08, 1–07 R
1967	Dunshaughlin	0-08	Athboy	0-05
1966	Summerhill	0–10	Kilallon	0-02
1965	Oldcastle	0-09, 1–09 R	Donaghmore	1-06, 0–04 R
1964	Enfield	1–13	Seneschalstown	0-04
1963	Drumconrath	3-04	Ballinabrackey	0–12
1962	St Peter's Dunboyne 'B'	1-09	Clonard	0-01
1961	Ratoath	2-07	Rathmolyon	2-04
1960	Kilbride	2-07	Clonard	0-04
1959	Drumree	1-08, 1–08 R, 1-04 2R	St Patrick's	1-08, 2–05 R, 0-05 2R
1958*	Clonard	2-06	Curraha	3-04

- 1958 – The name of a Curraha substitute wasn't supplied to the referee. Match was later awarded to Clonard.

== Meath Junior 'B' Football Championship ==
The Junior B Football Championship was abolished after 2019. All 'B' teams and St Paul's were incorporated into a new Premier Championship, while all other first teams competing in the Junior B Football Championship were regraded to the Junior Football Championship. The Junior B Championship was reintroduced in 2022.

Year	Winner	Score	Runner-up	Score
2026	Kilmainhamwood	1–26	Kilmainham	1–12
2025	St. Marys	2–09	Moynalty	0–13
2024	Carnaross	1–10	Moynalty	1–06
2023	Slane	2–10	Moynalty	0–10
2022	St. Brigid's	3–15	Slane	1-06
2021	No Championship			
2020	No Championship			
2019	Ratoath 'B'	2–15	Kilbride	1-09
2018	Na Fianna 'B'	3–10	Slane	2-05
2017	Gaeil Colmcille 'B'	4–16	Kilbride	1–14
2016	St Vincent's	0–16	Moynalty	1-08
2015	Seneschalstown 'B'	0–14	St Vincent's	1-07
2014	Wolfe Tones 'B'	1–11	Seneschalstown 'B'	1–10
2013	Boardsmill	1–13	Moynalty	2-09
2012	Dunshaughlin 'B'	0–12	St Mary's Donore	0-09
2011	Clonard	1–13	Ratoath 'B'	0-07
2010	Trim 'B'	2-04	Moynalty	0-09
2009	Duleek/Bellewstown 'B'	0–12	Moynalty	1-07
2008	Donaghmore/Ashbourne 'B'	1-08	St Vincent's	0-08
2007	Wolfe Tones 'B'	1–10	Trim 'B'	1-06
2006	St Brigid's Ballinacree	1-07	Clonard	0-06
2005	Boardsmill	1–10	St Brigid's Ballinacree	1-09
2004	Longwood	2–12	Walterstown 'B'	0-06
2003	St Vincent's	1–10	Boardsmill	2-06
2002	Summerhill 'B'	1-09	Walterstown 'B'	1-06
2001	Kilmainham	3–12	Longwood	0-09
2000	Dunderry 'B'	1–10	Kilmainham	2-06
1999	Drumbaragh Emmets	1-07	Walterstown 'B'	0-07
1998	Trim 'B'	0-09	Clonard	0-06
1997	Curraha	1-08	Castletown 'B'	0-09
1996	Seneschalstown 'B'	3–13	Clonard	0–12
1995	Simonstown Gaels 'B'	0–13	Curraha	0–11
1994	Dunshaughlin 'B'			
1993	Slane 'B'	1–09	Seneschalstown 'B'	0–10
1992	Batterstown	2–08	Dunshaughlin	0–10
1991	Trim 'B'	2–10	St Ultan's	0-05
1990	St. Peter's Dunboyne 'B'	0–11	Robinstown	0-08
1989	Skryne 'B'			
1988	Nobber 'B'	2-03	Skryne 'B'	1-03
1987	Simonstown Gaels 'B'	1-07	Duleek 'B'	1-06
1986	St Peter's Dunboyne 'B'	1-08	Ratoath 'B'	1-04
1985	Navan O'Mahonys 'C'	1–11	Castletown 'B'	1-05
1984	Ballivor 'B'			
1983	Slane 'B'	2-04	Walterstown 'C'	1-05
1982	Syddan 'B'	0-07	Duleek 'B'	2-00
1981	Martinstown/Athboy 'B'	1–10	Ballivor 'B'	0-05
1980	Walterstown 'C'	0–10	Martinstown/Athboy 'B'	1-05
1979	Gaeil Colmcille 'B'	4-06	Martinstown/Athboy 'B'	2-05
1978	Trim 'B'	1-05	Rathkenny 'B'	0-04
1977	Walterstown 'B'	2-09	Longwood	1-05
1976	Skryne 'C'	5-07	Baconstown	0-04
1975	St Patrick's 'B'	2-07	Curraha	0–11
1974	Gaeil Colmcille 'B'	0-05, 2–05 R	Nobber	1-02, 1–02 R
1973	Seneschalstown 'B'	2-04	Summerhill 'B'	0-02
1972	Batterstown	3-07	Summerhill 'B'	0-03
1971	Clonard	1-08	St Peter's Dunboyne 'B'	0-05
1970	Navan O'Mahonys 'B'	0-07	Simonstown Gaels	0-04
1969	Kilcloon	0-09	Shallon	0-06
1968	Gibbstown	0-08	Walterstown 'C'	0-04
1967	Skryne 'B'	3-07	Bective	0-05
1966	Gaeil Colmcille 'B'	1-04	Flathouse	0-03
1965	Bohermeen	4-06	Commons	1-02
1964	Martry	4-09	Boardsmill	2-01
1963	Kilberry	2-07	Lougher	2-05
1962	Donore 'B'	2–10	Athboy 'B'	2-04
1961	Walterstown	0–10	St Peter's Dunboyne 'B'	1-04
1960	Batterstown	1-09	Commons	2-04
1959	Longwood	5-06	Skryne 'B'	0-05
1958	Dunshaughlin	1-06	Rathmolyon	1-02
