= Blackhall Gaels GAA =

Gaelic sports club in County Meath, Ireland

Blackhall Gaels
- Gaeil Bhláth Gall
- Founded: 1995
- County: Meath
- Colours: Yellow and Blue
- Grounds: Batterstown and Kilcloon

Playing kits
Standard colours

Senior Club Championships
	All Ireland	Leinster champions	Meath champions
Football:	0	0	1

Blackhall Gaels is a Gaelic Athletic Association club based in the Parish of Kilcloon. The parish consists of the main townlands of Batterstown, Mulhussey and Kilcloon near the town of Dunboyne, in County Meath. The club plays hurling and football in Meath GAA competitions. The club grounds are located in Batterstown and Kilcloon, and training and matches take place in both these locations on a daily basis. Blackhall Gaels are a young team and currently compete at senior level. Players are usually graduates of the local primary schools: Scoil Naisiúnta Naomh Iosaif, Mulhussey; Scoil Oilibhéar Naofa, Kilcloon, and Rathregan NS in Batterstown. The club won the Meath Senior Football Championship in 2003 after beating Simonstown Gaels in the final.

== Honours ==
- Meath Senior Football Championship: 1
  - 2003
- Meath Intermediate Football Championship: 2
  - 1998, 2001
- Meath Intermediate Hurling Championship: 2
  - 2005, 2013
- Meath Junior Hurling Championship: 1
  - 2002

Preceded by Dunshaughlin	Meath Senior Football Champions; 2003	Succeeded by Skryne
