= Skryne GFC =

Irish football club

Skryne
- Scrín
- Founded: 1887
- County: Meath
- Colours: Blue and White
- Grounds: Skryne

Playing kits
Standard colours

Senior Club Championships
	All Ireland	Leinster champions	Meath champions
Football:	-	-	13

Skryne GFC is a Gaelic Athletic Association club based in the village of Skryne, in County Meath, Ireland. The club mainly plays Gaelic football and competes in Meath GAA competitions. Skryne has the second most Meath Senior Football Championship titles after Navan O Mahony's. Every All-Ireland winning Meath team has had at least one Skryne player as a panel member. Skryne have never been relegated from senior level in the football championship.

== History ==
In the 2010 Meath Senior Football Championship, Skryne finished second in Group B. The club went on to win against Seneschalstown in Páirc Tailteann on 26 September 2010. The final score was Seneschalstown 4-8 - 0-21 Skryne, giving Skryne their 13th Meath Football Championship title.

== Honors ==
- Meath Senior Football Championship (13): 1940, 1941, 1944, 1945, 1947, 1948, 1954, 1965, 1992, 1993, 1999, 2004, 2010
- Meath Intermediate Football Championship (1): 1933

== Notable players ==
- Trevor Giles
- Ciarán Lenehan
- John McDermott
- Paddy O'Brien
- Colm O'Rourke
- Mick O'Dowd
- Liam Hayes

Preceded by Seneschalstown	Meath Senior Football Champions; 2010	Succeeded by Summerhill
