= St Patrick's GAA (Meath) =

Gaelic games club in County Meath, Ireland

St Patrick's
- Naomh Phádraig
- Founded: 1950
- County: Meath
- Colours: White and green
- Grounds: Whyte Park
- Coordinates: 53.632912, -6.266399

Playing kits
Standard colours

Senior Club Championships
| | All Ireland | Leinster champions | Meath champions |
|---|---|---|---|
| Football: | 0 | 0 | 0 |
| Hurling: | 0 | 0 | 2 |

St Patrick's is a Gaelic Athletic Association club based in the village of Stamullen, in County Meath, Ireland. The club competes at Intermediate level in football and Junior level in hurling in Meath GAA competitions. The club was founded in January 1950 by the amalgamation of Stamullen and Julianstown GAA clubs. The original clubs were mildly successful in senior football with Stamullen and Julianstown both winning a Senior Football Championship.

== History ==
St Patrick's GAA was formed in 1950 by the amalgamation of local clubs Stamullen and Julianstown. The Julianstown colors were green and the Stamullen colors were black and white. The new club called St. Patrick’s GAA Club chose green and white as its colors. The merge between the sides took place because of the minor success the clubs were getting in the championship. Success came instantly to St. Patricks and the team won the Meath Intermediate Championship in 1951. The club spent many years moving from Intermediate level to Senior level before they reached senior level and stayed in 1975.

The new Club moved to the old grounds at Whyte Park. The land commission had acquired some of the lands of the Preston Estate at Gormanston (Lord Gormanston's Estate) and when dividing it into small farms provided a portion for the local football club. A site was also provided for Muintir na Tira at the same time.

St Patrick's GAA Club found senior status difficult and soon returned to the Intermediate ranks which was followed by a drop to junior. By 1963 the club had returned to Intermediate status and were Intermediate Champions again in that same year. St Patrick’s also won the Feis Cup in 1968 and the Junior Championship in 1975. St Patrick’ returned to senior status winning the Intermediate Championship on the 3rd attempt in as many years and the A League Division 1 in 2000. We continue in the senior ranks and have reached three quarter finals only to be beaten by the eventual winners each time.

The club has won 3 Junior Hurling Championships in the last 4 years with JP Ryan, Paul Tobin and Mark Scanlon winning All-Ireland medals with Meath in the same period. The Club has won 5 Junior Hurling Championships in 2004, 2005, 2007, 2013 and most recently 2014 along with the Div 3 league winners for 2014. 2015 will see the hurling team compete at Intermediate Level.

For the 2020 season, the club compete for football in ACFL "A" Div 2, Intermediate Football Championship & Corn na Boinne cup.

== Honours ==
=== Julianstown ===
- Meath Senior Football Championship: 1
  - 1889

=== Stamullen ===
- Meath Senior Football Championship: 1
  - 1900
