= 1996 Meath Senior Football Championship =

Meath S.F.C.
- Season: 1996
- Champions: Kilmainhamwood; 1st Senior Football Championship title
- Relegated: St. Colmcille's
- Leinster SCFC: Kilmainhamwood
- All Ireland SCFC: n/a
- Winning Captain: Brian Stafford (Kilmainhamwood)
- Man of the Match: Martin Crosbie (Kilmainhamwood)

The 1996 Meath Senior Football Championship was the 104th edition of the Meath GAA's premier club Gaelic football tournament for senior graded teams in County Meath, Ireland. The tournament consists of 18 teams, with the winner going on to represent Meath in the Leinster Senior Club Football Championship. The championship starts with a group stage and then progresses to a knock out stage.

Dunderry were the defending champions after they defeated Kilmainhamwood in the previous years final.

After losing all of their matches including a 44-point defeat to champions Kilmainhamwood, St. Colmcille's applied to be regraded to the 1997 I.F.C.

On 21 November 1996, Kilmainhamwood claimed their 1st Senior Championship title with a win over Seneschalstown in the final. Brian Stafford lifted the Keegan Cup for the 'Wood while Martin Crosbie claimed the 'Man of the Match' award.

== Team changes ==
The following teams have changed division since the 1995 championship season.

=== To S.F.C. ===
Promoted from I.F.C.

- Simonstown Gaels - (Intermediate Champions)

=== From S.F.C. ===
Regraded to I.F.C.

- ???

== Participating teams ==
The teams competing in the 1996 Meath Senior Championship are:

Club	Location	1995 Championship Position	1996 Championship Position
Ballinlough	Ballinlough & Kilskyre	Non Qualifier	Quarter-Finalist
Carnaross	Carnaross	Non Qualifier	Non Qualifier
Dunderry	Dunderry & Robinstown	Champions	Quarter-Finalist
Gaeil Colmcille	Kells	Non Qualifier	Non Qualifier
Kilmainhamwood	Kilmainhamwood	Finalist	Champions
Moynalvey	Moynalvey & Kiltale	Non Qualifier	Semi-Finalist
Navan O'Mahonys	Navan	Non Qualifier	Non Qualifier
Oldcastle	Oldcastle	Non Qualifier	Non Qualifier
Seneschalstown	Kentstown & Yellow Furze	Semi-Finalist	Finalist
Simonstown Gaels	Navan	I.F.C Champions	Non Qualifier
Skryne	Skryne & Tara	Non Qualifier	Non Qualifier
Slane	Slane & Monknewtown	Semi-Finalist	Non Qualifier
St. Colmcille's	Bettystown, Donacarney, Laytown & Mornington	Non Qualifier	Relegated to I.F.C
St. Michael's	Carlanstown & Kilbeg	Non Qualifier	Non Qualifier
St. Peter's Dunboyne	Dunboyne	Quarter-Finalist	Semi-Finalist
Summerhill	Summerhill	Quarter-Finalist	Non Qualifier
Trim	Trim	Non Qualifier	Non Qualifier
Walterstown	Navan	Non Qualifier	Non Qualifier

== Group stage ==
=== Group A ===
Team	Pld	W	L	D	PF	PA	PD	Pts
Moynalvey	5	3	0	2	73	46	+0	8
Ballinlough	5	3	1	1	66	55	+11	7
Slane	5	3	2	0	54	53	+1	6
St. Michael's	5	2	3	0	54	65	-11	4
Simonstown Gaels	5	1	3	1	39*	43*	-4*	3
Carnaross	5	1	4	0	40*	64*	-24*	2

Round 1:

- Simonstown Gaels 0-13, 1-8 Ballinlough, Nobber, 7/4/1996,
- Moynalvey 3-8, 2-3 Carnaross, Trim, 7/4/1996,
- Slane 0-11, 1-6 St. Michael's, Rathkenny, 7/4/1996,

Round 2:

- St. Michael's 0-10, 0-8 Simonstown Gaels, Kilberry, 28/4/1996,
- Moynalvey 1-7, 0-5 Slane, Walterstown, 5/5/1996,
- Ballinlough 2-7, 1-6 Carnaross, Oldcastle, 5/5/1996,

Round 3:

- St. Michael's 2-10, 0-11 Carnaross, Kells, 25/5/1996,
- Slane 0-10, 1-3 Simonstown Gaels, Pairc Tailteann, 25/5/1996,
- Moynalvey 2–6, 0-12 Ballinlough, Pairc Tailteann, 23/6/1996,

Round 4:

- Slane 3-9, 0-11 Carnaross, Castletown, 23/6/1996,
- Simonstown Gaels 1–9, 1-9 Moynalvey, Kells, 14/7/1996,
- Ballinlough 2-7, 0-11 St. Michael's, Kells, 6/8/1996,

Round 5:

- St. Michael's 0–8, 4-10 Moynalvey, Walterstown, 6/9/1996,
- Slane 1–7, 3-8 Ballinlough, Pairc Tailteann, 6/10/1996,
- Simonstown Gaels l, w Carnaross,

=== Group B ===
Team	Pld	W	L	D	PF	PA	PD	Pts
Seneschalstown	5	5	0	0	64	39	+25	10
Kilmainhamwood	5	4	1	0	111	66	+45	8
Summerhill	5	3	2	0	66	47	+19	6
Navan O'Mahonys	5	2	3	0	52*	45*	+7*	4
Gaeil Colmcille	5	1	4	0	64*	68*	-4*	2
St. Colmcille's	5	0	5	0	117	25	-92	0

Round 1:

- Navan O'Mahonys 4-13, 1-2 St. Colmcille's, Slane, 7/4/1996,
- Summerhill 0-18, 1-12 Gaeil Colmcille, Walterstown, 7/4/1996,
- Kilmainhamwood 2–7, 3-12 Seneschalstown, Pairc Tailteann, 7/4/1996,

Round 2:

- Summerhill 1-15, 0-3 St. Colmcille's, Skryne, 21/4/1996,
- Kilmainhamwood 3-9, 1-9 Gaeil Colmcille, Castletown, 28/4/1996,
- Seneschalstown 1-11, 1-5 Navan O'Mahonys, Pairc Tailteann, 28/4/1996,

Round 3:

- Seneschalstown 0-9, 0-6 Summerhill, Skryne, 5/5/1996,
- Kilmainhamwood 1-13, 0-14 Navan O'Mahonys, Carlanstown, 5/5/1996,
- Gaeil Colmcille 1-22, 2-6 St. Colmcille's, Kilberry, 10/5/1996,

Round 4:

- Seneschalstown 2-14, 1-9 Gaeil Colmcille, Pairc Tailteann, 25/5/1996,
- Summerhill 0-10, 0-5 Navan O'Mahonys, Pairc Tailteann, 26/5/1996,
- Kilmainhamwood 10-19, 0-5 St. Colmcille's, Syddan, 26/5/1996,

Round 5:

- Summerhill 1–11, 0-15 Kilmainhamwood, Pairc Tailteann, 6/10/1996,
- Navan O'Mahonys w, l Gaeil Colmcille,
- Seneschalstown w/o, scr St. Colmcille's,

=== Group C ===
Team	Pld	W	L	D	PF	PA	PD	Pts
Dunderry	5	4	1	0	66	50	+16	8
St. Peter's Dunboyne	5	4	1	0	66	48	+18	8
Skryne	5	3	2	0	70	61	+9	6
Oldcastle	5	2	2	1	53	63	-10	5
Trim	5	1	3	1	53	59	-6	3
Walterstown	5	0	5	0	37	75	-38	0

Round 1:

- Dunderry 1-10, 1-8 Trim, Kells, 7/4/1996,
- Skryne 1-16, 1-8 Oldcastle, Athboy, 7/4/1996,
- Walterstown 0–6, 4-12 St. Peter's Dunboyne, Kilmessan, 7/4/1996,

Round 2:

- Trim 0-7, 0-6 Walterstown, Pairc Tailteann, 21/4/1996,
- Skryne 1–5, 1-7 St. Peter's Dunboyne, Pairc Tailteann, 21/4/1996,
- Oldcastle 1-9, 0-9 Dunderry, Athboy, 5/5/1996,

Round 3:

- St. Peter's Dunboyne 0-15, 1-9 Trim, Kilmessan, 5/5/1996,
- Walterstown 0–6, 2-5 Oldcastle, Athboy, 25/5/1996,
- Skryne 0–12, 1-11 Dunderry, Pairc Tailteann, 23/6/1996,

Round 4:

- St. Peter's Dunboyne 3-9, 1-5 Oldcastle, Pairc Tailteann, 1/8/1996,
- Dunderry 0-16, 1-2 Walterstown, Pairc Tailteann, 5/10/1996,
- Skryne 1-11, 1-9 Trim, Kells, 6/10/1996,

Round 5:

- Oldcastle 1–8, 0-11 Trim, Kilskyre, 19/10/1996,
- Skryne 1-14, 2-8 Walterstown, 20/10/1996,
- Dunderry 0-14, 0-10 St. Peter's Dunboyne, 20/10/1996,

== Knock-out Stage ==
=== Finals ===
Quarter-Finals
Dunderry	2-7
Kilmainhamwood	2-9
St. Peter's Dunboyne	2-8
Ballinlough	1-10

Semi-Finals
Moynalvey	1-4
Kilmainhamwood	3-15
Seneschalstown	1-10
St. Peter's Dunboyne	0-12

Final
Kilmainhamwood	2-12
Seneschalstown	1-6

Quarter-Final:

- Ballinlough 1–10, 2-8 St. Peter's Dunboyne, Pairc Tailteann, 26/10/1996,
- Kilmainhamwood 2-9', 2-7 Dunderry, Kells, 26/10/1996,

Semi-Final:

- Moynalvey 1–4, 3-15 Kilmainhamwood, Pairc Tailteann, 2/11/1996,
- Seneschalstown 1-10, 0-12 St. Peter's Dunboyne, Pairc Tailteann, 3/11/1996,

Final:

- Kilmainhamwood 2-12, 1-6 Seneschalstown, Pairc Tailteann, 17/11/1996,
