= 1997 Meath Senior Football Championship =

Meath S.F.C.
- Season: 1997
- Champions: Navan O'Mahonys; 16th Senior Football Championship title
- Relegated: None
- Leinster SCFC: Navan O'Mahonys (Quarter-Final) Rathnew 1-8, Navan O'Mahonys 0-9
- All Ireland SCFC: n/a
- Winning Captain: Alan Reilly (Navan O'Mahonys)
- Man of the Match: Donal Smyth (Navan O'Mahonys)

The 1997 Meath Senior Football Championship was the 105th edition of the Meath GAA's premier club Gaelic football tournament for senior graded teams in County Meath, Ireland. The tournament consists of 18 teams, with the winner going on to represent Meath in the Leinster Senior Club Football Championship. The championship starts with a group stage and then progresses to a knock out stage.

Kilmainhamwood were the defending champions after they defeated Seneschalstown in the previous years final.

This was Cortown's first ever year as a senior club after claiming the 1996 IFC title.

The first ever 'Navan El Classico' in the SFC took place this year between Navan O'Mahonys and Simonstown Gaels on 27 September in Páirc Tailteann. O'Mahonys won a dour affair and hence qualified for the final.

On 12 October 1997, Navan O'Mahonys claimed their 16th Senior Championship title with a win over Trim in the final. Alan Reilly raised the Keegan Cup for O'Mahonys while Donal Smyth collected the 'Man of the Match' award.

== Team changes ==
The following teams have changed division since the 1996 championship season.

=== To S.F.C. ===
Promoted from I.F.C.

- Cortown - (Intermediate Champions)

=== From S.F.C. ===
Regraded to I.F.C.

- St. Colmcille's

== Participating teams ==
The teams competing in the 1997 Meath Senior Championship are:

Club	Location	1996 Championship Position	1997 Championship Position
Ballinlough	Ballinlough & Kilskyre	Quarter-Finalist	Non Qualifier
Carnaross	Carnaross	Non Qualifier	Non Qualifier
Cortown	Cortown	I.F.C Champions	Semi-Finalist
Dunderry	Dunderry & Robinstown	Quarter-Finalist	Non Qualifier
Gaeil Colmcille	Kells	Non Qualifier	Quarter-Finalist
Kilmainhamwood	Kilmainhamwood	Champions	Non Qualifier
Moynalvey	Moynalvey & Kiltale	Semi-Finalist	Non Qualifier
Navan O'Mahonys	Navan	Non Qualifier	Champions
Oldcastle	Oldcastle	Non Qualifier	Non Qualifier
Seneschalstown	Kentstown & Yellow Furze	Finalist	Quarter-Finalist
Simonstown Gaels	Navan	Non Qualifier	Semi-Finalist
Skryne	Skryne & Tara	Non Qualifier	Non Qualifier
Slane	Slane & Monknewtown	Non Qualifier	Non Qualifier
St. Michael's	Carlanstown & Kilbeg	Non Qualifier	Non Qualifier
St. Peter's Dunboyne	Dunboyne	Semi-Finalist	Non Qualifier
Summerhill	Summerhill	Non Qualifier	Non Qualifier
Trim	Trim	Non Qualifier	Finalist
Walterstown	Navan	Non Qualifier	Non Qualifier

== Group stage ==
=== Group A ===
Team	Pld	W	L	D	PF	PA	PD	Pts
Navan O'Mahonys	5	5	0	0	42	34	+8	10
Cortown	5	3	1	1	64	50	+14	7
Kilmainhamwood	5	3	2	0	57	53	+4	6
Oldcastle	5	2	3	0	54	49	+5	4
Ballinlough	5	1	4	0	52	61	-9	2
St. Michael's	5	0	5	0	43	65	-22	0

Round 1:

- Navan O'Mahonys 1-9, 1-8 Cortown, Dunderry, 5/4/1997,
- Kilmainhamwood 0-10, 1-6 St. Michael's, Castletown, 5/4/1997,
- Oldcastle 1-7, 0-8 Ballinlough, Kells, 5/4/1997,

Round 2:

- Oldcastle 2-14, 0-9 St. Michael's, Kells, 19/4/1997,
- Navan O'Mahonys 1-11, 0-10 Kilmainhamwood, Carlanstown, 20/4/1997,
- Cortown 0–11, 0-11 Ballinlough, Kells, 20/4/2997,

Round 3:

- Cortown 1-15, 0-10 St. Michael's, Carnaross, 3/5/1997,
- Navan O'Mahonys 0-7, 0-6 Ballinlough, Kells, 4/5/1997,
- Kilmainhamwood 0-10, 0-9 Oldcastle, Kells, 18/5/1997,

Round 4:

- Cortown 0-11, 0-9 Kilmainhamwood, Kells, 14/6/1997,
- Ballinlough 1-14, 2-9 St. Michael's, Carnaross, 18/6/1997,
- Navan O'Mahonys 0-9, 0-7 Oldcastle, Athboy, 20/6/1997,

Round 5:

- Cortown 1-10, 0-8 Oldcastle, Kilskyre, 23/8/1997,
- Kilmainhamwood 1-15, 1-7 Ballinlough, Kells, 23/8/1997,
- Navan O'Mahonys w/o, scr St. Michael's,

=== Group B ===
Team	Pld	W	L	D	PF	PA	PD	Pts
Trim	5	4	1	0	69	56	+13	8
Seneschalstown	5	3	2	0	77	66	+11	6
Walterstown	5	3	2	0	39*	39*	+0*	6
Summerhill	5	2	2	1	60	59	+1	5
Dunderry	5	2	2	1	59	63	-4	5
Carnaross	5	0	5	0	48*	69*	-21*	0

Round 1:

- Summerhill 1-15, 1-9 Seneschalstown, Skryne, 5/4/1997,
- Dunderry 3-11, 1-11 Carnaross, Kells, 6/4/1997,
- Walterstown 0-11, 0-10 Trim, Kilmessan, 6/4/1997,

Round 2:

- Trim 0-13, 0-5 Dunderry, Pairc Tailteann, 20/4/1997,
- Summerhill 0-13, 1-8 Carnaross, Athboy, 20/4/1997,
- Seneschalstown 0-10, 1-3 Walterstown, Pairc Tailteann, 20/4/1997,

Round 3:

- Seneschalstown 4-9, 0-10 Carnaross, Pairc Tailteann, 4/5/1997,
- Dunderry 0-10, 1-6 Walterstown, Pairc Tailteann, 18/5/1997,
- Trim 0-13, 1-7 Summerhill, Longwood, 21/5/1997,

Round 4:

- Walterstown w, l Carnaross, Martry, 23/8/1997,
- Summerhill 0–10, 0-10 Dunderry, Pairc Tailteann, 24/8/1997,
- Trim 0-18, 3-8 Seneschalstown, Pairc Tailteann, 31/8/1997,

Round 5:

- Walterstown 1-10, 0-9 Summerhill, Dunshaughlin, 31/8/1997,
- Seneschalstown 0-17, 2-8 Dunderry, Pairc Tailteann, 7/9/1997,
- Trim 1-12, 1-10 Carnaross, Athboy, 7/9/1997,

Quarter-Final Playoff:

- Seneschalstown1-14, 0-8 Walterstown, Pairc Tailteann, 14/9/1997,

=== Group C ===
Team	Pld	W	L	D	PF	PA	PD	Pts
Gaeil Colmcille	5	4	1	0	69	47	+22	8
Simonstown Gaels	5	4	1	0	68	53	+15	8
Skryne	5	3	1	1	40*	40*	+0*	7
St. Peter's Dunboyne	5	2	3	0	41	50	-9	4
Slane	5	1	4	0	37	46	-9	2
Moynalvey	5	0	5	0	19*	38*	-19*	0

Round 1:

- St. Peter's Dunboyne 0-11, 1-6 Slane, Walterstown, 5/4/1997,
- Simonstown Gaels 1-10, 1-9 Skryne, Seneschalstown, 6/4/1997,
- Gaeil Colmcille 0-11, 0-3 Moynalvey, Trim, 6/4/1997,

Round 2:

- Simonstown Gaels 3-9, 0-8 St. Peter's Dunboyne, Dunshaughlin, 19/4/1997,
- Skryne 2-9, 1-11 Gaeil Colmcille, Pairc Tailteann, 20/4/1997,
- Slane 0-10, 1-6 Moynalvey, Walterstown, 6/4/1997,

Round 3:

- Gaeil Colmcille 1-7, 0-9 St. Peter's Dunboyne, Pairc Tailteann, 4/5/1997,
- Simonstown Gaels 1-7, 0-8 Slane, Rathkenny, 17/5/1997,
- Skryne w, l Moynalvey, Dunboyne, 17/5/1997,

Round 4:

- Simonstown Gaels 0-17, 0-7 Moynalvey, Skryne, 20/6/1997,
- Gaeil Colmcille 2-10, 0-10 Slane, Castletown, 28/6/1997,
- Skryne 1–10, 2-7 St. Peter's Dunboyne, Dunshaughlin, 23/8/1997,

Round 5:

- Gaeil Colmcille 1-15, 0-10 Simonstown Gaels, Athboy, 24/8/1997,
- St. Peter's Dunboyne w/o, scr Moynalvey,
- Skryne w/o, scr Slane,

== Knock-out Stage ==
=== Finals ===
Quarter-Finals
Simonstown Gaels	0-15
Seneschalstown	0-6
Cortown	0-8
Gaeil Colmcille	1-4

Semi-Finals
Navan O'Mahonys	1-8
Simonstown Gaels	0-9
Trim	0-17
Cortown	0-13

Final
Navan O'Mahonys	1-10
Trim	0-7

Quarter-Final:

- Cortown 0-8, 1-4 Gaeil Colmcille, Pairc Tailteann, 31/8/1997,
- Simonstown Gaels 0-15, 0-6 Seneschalstown, Pairc Tailteann, 21/9/1997,

Semi-Final:

- Trim 0-17, 0-13 Cortown, Pairc Tailteann, 21/9/1997,
- Navan O'Mahonys 1-8, 0-9 Simonstown Gaels, Pairc Tailteann, 27/9/1997,

Final:

- Navan O'Mahonys 1-10, 0-7 Trim, Pairc Tailteann, 12/10/1997,

== Leinster Senior Club Football Championship ==
Quarter Final:

- Rathnew 1–6, 0-9 Navan O'Mahonys, Aughrim, 8/11/1997,
- Navan O'Mahonys 0–9, 1-8 Rathnew, Pairc Tailteann, 15/11/2997,
