= 1993 Meath Senior Football Championship =

Meath S.F.C.
- Season: 1993
- Champions: Skryne; 10th Senior Championship Title
- Relegated: ???
- Leinster SCFC: Skryne (Quarter-Final) Mullingar Shamrocks 1-11, 1-7 Skryne
- All Ireland SCFC: n/a
- Winning Captain: Louis Pentony (Skryne)
- Man of the Match: John McDermott (Skryne)

The 1993 Meath Senior Football Championship is the 101st edition of the Meath GAA's premier club Gaelic football tournament for senior graded teams in County Meath, Ireland. The tournament consists of 15 teams, with the winner going on to represent Meath in the Leinster Senior Club Football Championship. The championship starts with a group stage and then progresses to a knock out stage.

This was St. Peter's Dunboyne's return to the grade after claiming the 1992 Meath Intermediate Football Championship title.

Skryne were the defending champions after they defeated Seneschalstown in the previous years final, and they successfully defended their title top claim their 10th Keegan Cup when they defeated Navan O'Mahonys 3–5 to 2–7 in Pairc Tailteann on 31 October 1993. Louis Pentony raised the Keegan Cup for Skryne while John McDermott claimed the 'Man of the Match' award.

== Team changes ==
The following teams have changed division since the 1992 championship season.

=== To S.F.C. ===
Promoted from I.F.C.

- St. Peter's Dunboyne's - (Intermediate Champions)

=== From S.F.C. ===
Regraded to I.F.C.

- None

== Group stage ==
=== Group A ===
Team	Pld	W	L	D	PF	PA	PD	Pts
Ballinlough	4	2	0	2	0	0	+0	6
Walterstown	4	2	0	2	0	0	+0	6
Seneschalstown	4	1	0	3	0	0	+0	5
St. Colmcille's	4	1	3	0	0	0	+0	2
St. Michael's	4	0	3	1	0	0	+0	1

Round 1

- Ballinlough 2-10, 1-4 St. Colmcille's, Rathkenny, 4/4/1993,
- Walterstown 0–10, 2-4 Seneschalstown, Pairc Tailteann, 10/4/1993,
- St. Michael's - Bye,

Round 2

- Ballinlough 1-9, 1-7 St. Michael's, Carnaross, 18/4/1993,
- Walterstown 2-12, 0-10 St. Colmcille's, Pairc Tailteann, 2/5/1993,
- Seneschalstown - Bye,

Round 3

- St. Michael's 1–7, 0-10 Seneschalstown, Pairc Tailteann, 2/5/1993,
- Walterstown 0–8, 0-8 Ballinlough, Kells, 22/5/1993,
- St. Colmcille's - Bye,

Round 4

- St. Colmcille's 1-8, 0-8 St. Michael's, Seneschalstown, 22/5/1993,
- Ballinlough 1–7, 0-10 Seneschalstown,
- Walterstown - Bye,

Round 5

- Walterstown 1-15, 0-6 St. Michael's, Martry, 11/7/1993,
- Seneschalstown w, l St. Colmcille's,
- Ballinlough - Bye,

Quarter-final/Semi-final Playoff:

- Ballinlough 1–11, 2-8 Walterstown, Kells, 26/9/1993,
- Ballinlough 2-11, 2-7 Walterstown, Kells, 3/10/1993,

=== Group B ===
Team	Pld	W	L	D	PF	PA	PD	Pts
Dunderry	4	3	1	0	0	0	+0	6
Navan O'Mahonys	4	3	1	0	0	0	+0	6
Summerhill	4	2	2	0	0	0	+0	4
Trim	4	2	2	0	0	0	+0	4
Slane	4	0	4	0	0	0	+0	0

Round 1

- Summerhill 1-10, 0-7 Slane, Walterstown, 4/4/1993,
- Navan O'Mahonys 3-12, 2-8 Dunderry, Martry, 10/4/1993,
- Trim - Bye,

Round 2

- Navan O'Mahonys 3-8, 0-8 Summerhill, Kilmessan, 24/4/1993,
- Dunderry 1-11, 2-6 Trim, Kells, 25/4/1993,
- Slane - Bye,

Round 3

- Trim 2-6, 1-8 Slane, Skryne, 16/5/1993,
- Dunderry 0-13, 1-8 Summerhill, Boardsmill, 23/5/1993,
- Navan O'Mahonys - Bye,

Round 4

- Trim 0-11, 0-9 Navan O'Mahonys, Dunderry, 13/7/1993,
- Dunderry 2-8, 0-5 Slane, Pairc Tailteann, 29/8/1993,
- Summerhill - Bye,

Round 5

- Summerhill 2-10, 0-15 Trim, 29/8/1993,
- Navan O'Mahonys w/o, scr Slane,
- Dunderry - Bye,

Quarter-final/Semi-final Playoff:

- Dunderry 3-10, 0-13 Navan O'Mahonys, 26/9/1993,

=== Group C ===
Team	Pld	W	L	D	PF	PA	PD	Pts
Skryne	4	3	0	1	0	0	+0	6
Gaeil Colmcille	4	3	0	1	0	0	+0	6
St. Peter's Dunboyne's	4	1	2	1	0	0	+0	3
Oldcastle	4	1	2	1	0	0	+0	3
Moynalvey	4	0	4	0	0	0	+0	0

Round 1

- Skryne 0–9, 0-9 Gaeil Colmcille, Pairc Tailteann, 4/4/1993,
- St. Peter's Dunboyne 0-16, 0-7 Moynalvey, Summerhill, 10/4/1993,
- Oldcastle - Bye,

Round 2

- Skryne 1-11, 0-6 Oldcastle, Pairc Tailteann, 18/4/1993,
- Gaeil Colmcille 1-13, 3-3 Moynalvey, Pairc Tailteann, 21/5/1993,
- St. Peter's Dunboyne - Bye,

Round 3

- St. Peter's Dunboyne 2–6, 2-6 Oldcastle, Pairc Tailteann, 15/5/1993,
- Skryne 0-15, 2-6 Moynalvey, Dunshaughlin, 13/7/1993,
- Gaeil Colmcille - Bye,

Round 4

- Gaeil Colmcille 2-8, 1-6 Oldcastle, Pairc Tailteann, 11/7/1993,
- Skryne 3-6, 0-9 St. Peter's Dunboyne, 5/9/1993,
- Moynalvey - Bye,

Round 5

- Gaeil Colmcille w, l St. Peter's Dunboyne,
- Oldcastle w, l Moynalvey,
- Skryne - Bye,

== Knock-out Stages ==
The teams in the quarter-finals are the second placed teams from each group and the Group C winner. The teams in the semi-finals are Group A and B winners along with the quarter-final winners.

Quarter-Finals
Navan O'Mahonys	2-13
Gaeil Colmcille	1-13
Skryne	2-9 (R)
Walterstown	0-8 (R)

Semi-Finals
Ballinlough	1-4
Navan O'Mahonys	2-11
Dunderry	1-8
Skryne	2-9

Final
Navan O'Mahonys	2-7
Skryne	3-5

Quarter-finals:

- Navan O'Mahonys 2-13, 1-13 Gaeil Colmcille, Pairc Tailteann, 3/10/1993,
- Skryne 1–10, 1-10 Walterstown, Pairc Tailteann, 9/10/1993,

Quarter-final Replay:

- Skryne 2-9, 0-8 Walterstown, Pairc Tailteann, 16/10/1993,

Semi-finals:

- Navan O'Mahonys 2-11, 1-4 Ballinlough, Kells, 17/10/1993,
- Skryne 2-9, 1-8 Dunderry, Pairc Tailteann, 23/10/1993,

Final:

- Skryne 3-5, 2-7 Navan O'Mahonys, Pairc Tailteann, 31/10/1993,

== Leinster Senior Club Football Championship ==
Quarter-final:

- ???
