= 1996 Meath Intermediate Football Championship =

Meath I.F.C.
- Season: 1996
- Champions: Cortown; 1st Intermediate Football Championship title
- Relegated: Gaeil Colmcille 'B'; St. Mary's Donore
- Matches: 64

The 1996 Meath Intermediate Football Championship is the 70th edition of the Meath GAA's premier club Gaelic football tournament for intermediate graded teams in County Meath, Ireland. The tournament consists of 17 teams. The championship starts with a group stage and then progresses to a knock out stage.

From the 1996 season onwards, Donaghmore changed their name to Donaghmore/Ashbourne to reflect the increased number of players and supporters from Ashbourne.

Duleek were promoted after claiming the 1995 Meath Junior Football Championship title.

On 6 October 1996, Cortown claimed their 1st Intermediate championship title when they defeated Duleek 2–5 to 0–8 in the final.

Gaeil Colmcille B's and St. Mary's Donore were regraded to the J.F.C. for 1997 season.

== Team changes ==
The following teams have changed division since the 1995 championship season.

=== From I.F.C. ===
Promoted to S.F.C.

- Simonstown Gaels - (Intermediate Champions)

Relegated to J.A.F.C.

- ???

=== To I.F.C. ===
Regraded from S.F.C.

- ???

Promoted from J.A.F.C.

- Duleek - (Junior 'A' Champions)

== Group stage ==
There are 3 groups called Group A, B and C. The top finishers in Group A and C will qualify for the semi-finals. First place in Group B along with the runners-up in all the groups qualify for the quarter-finals.

=== Group A ===
Team	Pld	W	L	D	PF	PA	PD	Pts
Dunshaughlin	5	4	0	1	77*	40*	+37*	9
St. Patrick's	5	4	1	0	56	47	+9	8
Rathkenny	5	3	1	1	55*	45*	+10*	7
Moynalty	5	2	3	0	61*	55*	+6*	4
Ballinabrackey	5	1	4	0	42**	52**	-10**	2
Athboy	5	0	5	0	25*	77*	-52*	0

Round 1:

- Dunshaughlin 2-13, 2-9 St. Patrick's, Donaghmore, 7/4/1996,
- Rathkenny 2-11, 3-4 Ballinabrackey, Longwood, 7/4/1996,
- Moynalty 4-11, 0-9 Athboy, Carlanstown, 7/4/1996,

Round 2:

- Dunshaughlin 0-12, 1-6 Moynalty, Rathkenny, 28/4/1996,
- St. Patrick's 1-12, 1-8 Ballinabrackey, Walterstown, 28/4/1996,
- Rathkenny 3-10, 1-8 Athboy, Kells, 5/5/1996,

Round 3:

- St. Patrick's 1-13, 0-9 Moynalty, Seneschalstown, 5/5/1996,
- Dunshaughlin 0–11, 2-5 Rathkenny, Seneschalstown, 26/5/1996,
- Ballinabrackey w, l Athboy, Ballivor, 8/6/1996,

Round 4:

- Moynalty 2-14, 4-6 Ballinabrackey, Athboy, 15/6/1996,
- Dunshaughlin 6-17, 0-5 Athboy, Walterstown, 23/6/1996,
- St. Patrick's 1-7, 1-5 Rathkenny, Skryne, 14/7/1996,

Round 5:

- Dunshaughlin w, l Ballinabrackey, Summerhill, 21/7/1996,
- St. Patrick's w/o, scr Athboy,
- Rathkenny w, l Moynalty,

=== Group B ===
Team	Pld	W	L	D	PF	PA	PD	Pts
Cortown	5	4	0	1	83	41	+42	9
Castletown	5	4	0	1	57*	32*	+25*	9
Gaeil Colmcille 'B'	5	2	3	0	60	62	-2	4
St. Brigid's Ballinacree	5	2	3	0	59	66	-7	4
Blackhall Gaels	5	2	3	0	29*	44*	-15*	4
St. Mary's Donore	5	0	5	0	41	84	-43	0

Round 1:

- Gaeil Colmcille 'B' 1-13, 0-9 Blackhall Gaels, Walterstown, 7/4/1996,
- Cortown 4-13, 0-7 St. Mary's, Seneschalstown, 7/4/1996,
- Castletown 2-8, 0-10 St. Brigid's, Ballinlough, 7/4/1996,

Round 2:

- Cortown 1–5, 0-8 Castletown, Seneschalstown, 21/4/1996,
- Blackhall Gaels 1-10, 0-9 St. Brigid's, Kilberry, 21/4/1996,
- Gaeil Colmcille 'B' 3-6, 0-10 St. Mary's, Castletown, 28/4/1996,

Round 3:

- Cortown 3-11, 1-8 Gaeil Colmcille 'B', Martry, 4/5/1996,
- Castletown w, l Blackhall Gaels, Seneschalstown, 5/5/1996,
- St. Brigid's 2-14, 2-13 St. Mary's, Kells, 5/5/1996,

Round 4:

- St. Brigid's 1-9, 0-9 Gaeil Colmcille 'B', Ballinlough, 19/5/1996,
- Cortown 3-10, 1-4 Blackhall Gaels, Dunderry, 25/5/1996,
- Castletown 1-21, 0-5 St. Mary's, Syddan, 26/5/1996,

Round 5:

- Blackhall Gaels w/o, scr St. Mary's, Skryne, 7/6/1996,
- Cortown 0-11, 1-5 St. Brigid's, Ballinlough, 8/6/1996,
- Castletown 1-8, 1-6 Gaeil Colmcille 'B', Carlanstown, 8/6/1996,

1st Place Playoff:

- Cortown 3-10, 1-8 Castletown, Kells, 8/6/1996,

=== Group C ===
Team	Pld	W	L	D	PF	PA	PD	Pts
Duleek	4	3	0	1	58	46	+12	7
Syddan	4	2	1	1	52	47	+5	5
St. Ultan's	4	1	1	2	22**	27**	-5*	4
Donaghmore/Ashbourne	4	1	1	2	36*	44*	-8	4
Ballivor	4	0	4	0	38*	42*	-4*	0

Round 1:

- Syddan 1-10, 1-9 Ballivor, Gibbstown. 7/4/1996,
- St. Ultan's 1–8, 0-11 Duleek, Skryne, 7/4/1996,
- Donaghmore/Ashbourne - Bye,

Round 2:

- Syddan 2–4, 1-7 Donaghmore/Ashbourne, Seneschalstown, 21/4/1996,
- Duleek 1-10, 1-9 Ballivor, Kilmessan, 5/5/1996,
- St. Ultan's - Bye,

Round 3:

- Donaghmore/Ashbourne d, d St. Ultan's, Dunshaughlin, 5/5/1996,
- Duleek 2-8, 1-10 Syddan, Pairc Tailteann, 19/5/1996,
- Ballivor - Bye,

Round 4:

- Donaghmore/Ashbourne 2-10, 1-11 Ballivor, Walterstown, 25/5/1996,
- Syddan 3-7, 2-5 St. Ultan's, Kilberry, 26/5/1996,
- Duleek - Bye,

Round 5:

- Duleek 2-14, 0-10 Donaghmore/Ashbourne, Walterstown, 23/6/1996,
- St. Ultan's w, l Ballivor,
- Syddan - Bye,

== Knock-out Stages ==
=== Finals ===
The teams in the quarter-finals are the second placed teams from each group and the Group B winner. The teams in the semi-finals are Group A and C winners along with the quarter-final winners.

Quarter-Finals
Duleek	1-9
Castletown	0-10
Syddan	4-16 R
St. Patrick's	2-18 R

Semi-Finals
Duleek	2-5
Dunshaughlin	0-9
Cortown	2-14
Syddan	1-6

Final
Duleek	0-8
Cortown	2-5

Quarter-final:

- Duleek 1-9, 0-10 Castletown, Pairc Tailteann, 8/9/1996,
- Syddan 1–12, 3-6 St. Patrick's, Pairc Tailteann, 8/9/1996,

Quarter-final Replay:

- Syddan 4-16, 2-18 St. Patrick's, Pairc Tailteann, 14/9/1996, (A.E.T.)

Semi-final:

- Duleek 2-5, 0-9 Dunshaughlin, Pairc Tailteann, 22/9/1996,
- Cortown 2-14, 1-6 Syddan, Pairc Tailteann, 22/9/1996,

Final:

- Cortown 2-5, 0-8 Duleek, Pairc Tailteann, 6/10/1996,
