= 1993 Meath Intermediate Football Championship =

Meath I.F.C.
- Season: 1993
- Champions: Carnaross; 2nd Intermediate Football Championship title
- Relegated: None
- Matches: ??

The 1993 Meath Intermediate Football Championship is the 67th edition of the Meath GAA's premier club Gaelic football tournament for intermediate graded teams in County Meath, Ireland. The tournament consists of 20 teams. The championship starts with a group stage and then progresses to a knock out stage.

This was the first time a Gaeil Colmcille reserve side took part in the middle grade as they were promoted from the J.F.C. after claiming the 1992 Meath Junior Football Championship title.

On 14 November 1993, Carnaross claimed their 2nd Intermediate championship title (36 years after their first) when they defeated Kilmainhamwood 1–8 to 0–10 in the final at Pairc Tailteann.

== Team changes ==
The following teams have changed division since the 1992 championship season.

=== From I.F.C. ===
Promoted to S.F.C.

- St. Peter's Dunboyne - (Intermediate Champions)

Relegated to 1992 J.A.F.C.

- None

=== To I.F.C. ===
Regraded from S.F.C.

- None

Promoted from 1992 J.A.F.C.

- Gaeil Colmcille 'B' - (Junior 'A' Champions)

== Group stage ==
There are 4 groups called Group A, B, C and D. The top two finishers in all groups will qualify for the quarter-finals.

=== Group A ===
Team	Pld	W	L	D	PF	PA	PD	Pts
St. Mary's Donore	4	4	0	0	0	0	+0	8
Rathkenny	4	3	1	0	0	0	+0	6
Dunsany	4	2	2	0	0	0	+0	4
Ballivor	4	1	3	0	0	0	+0	2
Navan O'Mahonys 'B'	4	0	4	0	0	0	+0	0

Round 1:

- St. Mary's 2-12, 1-8 Rathkenny, Slane, 10/4/1993,
- Ballivor 5-10, 1-2 Navan O'Mahonys 'B', 11/4/1993,
- Dunsany - Bye,

Round 2:

- Rathkenny w, l Ballivor, Kells, 16/5/1993,
- Dunsany w, l Navan O'Mahonys 'B', Dunshaughlin, 16/5/1993,
- St. Mary's - Bye,

Round 3:

- Rathkenny 3-16, 1-1 Navan O'Mahonys 'B', Kilberry, 22/5/1993,
- St. Mary's w, l Dunsany, Duleek, 22/5/1993,
- Ballivor - Bye,

Round 4:

- Dunsany w, l Ballivor, Summerhill, 15/7/1993,
- St. Mary's w, l Navan O'Mahonys 'B',
- Rathkenny - Bye,

Round 5:

- Rathkenny 1-11, 0-11 Dunsany, 5/9/1993,
- St. Mary's 3-12, 0-8 Ballivor, 5/9/1993,
- Navan O'Mahonys 'B' - Bye,

First Place Playoff:

- Rathkenny 1-13, 1-7 St. Mary's 26/9/1993,

=== Group B ===
Team	Pld	W	L	D	PF	PA	PD	Pts
Simonstown Gaels	4	3	0	1	0	0	+0	7
Syddan	4	2	1	1	0	0	+0	5
Ballinabrackey	4	2	1	1	0	0	+0	5
Nobber	4	1	3	0	0	0	+0	2
Gaeil Colmcille 'B'	4	0	3	1	0	0	+0	1

Round 1:

- Syddan 2-11, 2-4 Nobber, Castletown, 4/4/1993,
- Ballinabrackey 3-10, 2-7 Gaeil Colmcille 'B', Pairc Tailteann, 4/4/1993,
- Simonstown Gaels - Bye,

Round 2:

- Simonstown Gaels 1-12, 2-1 Gaeil Colmcille 'B', Martry, 18/4/1993,
- Syddan 2-6, 0-9 Ballinabrackey, Athboy, 18/4/1993,
- Nobber - Bye,

Round 3:

- Syddan 3–8, 2-11 Gaeil Colmcille 'B', Walterstown, 16/5/1993,
- Simonstown Gaels 1-10, 1-8 Nobber, Kilberry, 16/5/1993,
- Ballinabrackey - Bye,

Round 4:

- Simonstown Gaels 1–13, 3-7 Ballinabrackey, Ballivor, 11/7/1993,
- Nobber w, l Gaeil Colmcille 'B',
- Syddan - Bye,

Round 5:

- Ballinabrackey w l Nobber, Athboy, 31/7/1993,
- Simonstown Gaels 2-14, 1-7 Syddan, 26/9/1993,
- Gaeil Colmcille 'B' - Bye,

Quarter-final Playoff:

- Syddan 2-7, 0-4 Ballinabrackey, 3/10/1993,

=== Group C ===
Team	Pld	W	L	D	PF	PA	PD	Pts
Kilmainhamwood	4	4	0	0	0	0	+0	8
Carnaross	4	3	1	0	0	0	+0	6
St. Patrick's	4	2	2	0	0	0	+0	4
Athboy	4	2	2	0	0	0	+0	4
Meath Hill	4	0	4	0	0	0	+0	0

Round 1:

- Carnaross 1-13, 0-7 Meath Hill, Carlanstown, 4/4/1993,
- Kilmainhamwood 2-8, 1-4 St. Patrick's, Rathkenny, 4/4/1993,
- Athboy - Bye,

Round 2:

- Athboy 2-6, 0-8 Meath Hill, Carnaross, 18/4/1993,
- Carnaross 0-11, 1-5 Kilmainhamwood, Castletown, 18/4/1993,
- St. Patrick's - Bye,

Round 3:

- Kilmainhamwood 5-15, 0-4 Meath Hill, Nobber, 8/5/1993,
- Athboy w, l St. Patrick's, Seneschalstown, 14/5/1993,
- Carnaross - Bye,

Round 4:

- Carnaross w, l Athboy, Cortown, 13/7/1993,
- St. Patrick's w, l Meath Hill,
- Kilmainhamwood - Bye,

Round 5:

- Kilmainhamwood 9-17, 1-7 Athboy, 5/9/1993,
- St. Patrick's 1-8, 0-9 Carnaross, 26/9/1993,
- Meath Hill - Bye,

=== Group D ===
Team	Pld	W	L	D	PF	PA	PD	Pts
Dunshaughlin	4	4	0	0	0	0	+0	8
Donaghmore	4	2	1	1	0	0	+0	5
Castletown	4	2	2	0	0	0	+0	4
St. Ultan's	4	1	2	1	0	0	+0	3
Moynalty	4	0	4	0	0	0	+0	0

Round 1:

- St. Ultan's 2-9, 0-8 Moynalty, Carlanstown, 4/4/1993,
- Donaghmore 1-9, 1-8 Castletown, Donore, 4/4/1993,
- Dunshaughlin - Bye,

Round 2:

- Dunshaughlin 0-19, 1-7 Donaghmore, Walterstown, 18/4/1993,
- Castletown 1-11, 2-6 St. Ultan's, Kilberry, 18/4/1993,
- Moynalty - Bye,

Round 3:

- Dunshaughlin 1-20, 0-3 Moynalty, Kilberry, 2/5/1993,
- Donaghmore 2–12, 3-9 St. Ultan's, Dunshaughlin, 16/5/1993,
- Castletown - Bye,

Round 4:

- Dunshaughlin 2-10, 0-10 Castletown, Walterstown, 16/5/1993,
- Donaghmore w, l Moynalty,
- St. Ultan's - Bye,

Round 5:

- Dunshaughlin 0-17, 0-4 St. Ultan's, Skryne, 11/7/1993,
- Castletown w, l Moynalty,
- Donaghmore - Bye,

== Knock-out Stages ==
=== Finals ===
The teams in the quarter-finals are the top two finishers from each group.

Quarter-Finals
Kilmainhamwood	1-11
Simonstown Gaels	1-6
Rathkenny	3-10'
Donaghmore	1-8
Dunshaughlin	0-10
St. Mary's	0-8
Carnaross	1-11
Syddan	2-6

Semi-Finals
Kilmainhamwood	3-14
Rathkenny	1-6
Dunshaughlin	1-17 (R)
Carnaross	3-15 (R)

Final
Kilmainhamwood	0-10
Carnaross	1-8

Quarter-final:

- Kilmainhamwood 1-11, 1-6 Simonstown Gaels, Kells, 3/10/1993,
- Dunshaughlin 0-10, 0-8 St. Mary's, Skryne, 3/10/1993,
- Carnaross 1-11, 2-6 Syddan, Kells, 9/10/1993,
- Rathkenny 3-10, 1-8 Donaghmore, Seneschalstown, 9/10/1993,

Semi-final:

- Carnaross 1–4, 0-7 Dunshaughlin, Pairc Tailteann, 16/10/1993,
- Kilmainhamwood 3-14, 1-6 Rathkenny, Pairc Tailteann, 31/10/1993,

Semi-final Replay:

- Carnaross 3-15, 1-17 Dunshaughlin, Pairc Tailteann, 24/10/1993, (A.E.T.)

Final:

- Carnaross 1-8, 0-10 Kilmainhamwood, Pairc Tailteann, 14/11/1993,
