= Mattock River =

River in Ireland

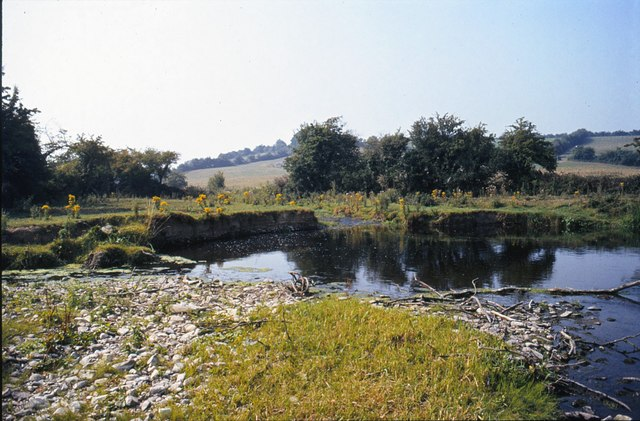
Ford crossing the Mattock River between Monknewtown, Co. Meath, and Keerhan, Co. Louth

The Mattock River is a river in Ireland. It is a tributary of the River Boyne.

Its source is near Collon (53.775°N 6.495°W), from where it flows through County Louth towards the southeast until a place west of Drummond Tower in Coolfore where it begins to form the boundary between Counties Meath and Louth. Here it turns towards the southwest until Monknewtown where it takes a southeastern direction again before turning roughly east at Dowth. It joins the River Boyne at Oldbridge in the parish of Drogheda (53.7207°N 6.4276°W). The estimated terrain elevation above sea level is 10 metres.
