= 1994 Meath Senior Football Championship =

Meath S.F.C.
- Season: 1994
- Champions: Seneschalstown; 2nd Senior Championship Title
- Relegated: None
- Leinster SCFC: Seneschalstown (Final) Kilmacud Crokes 0-12, 1-8 Seneschalstown
- All Ireland SCFC: n/a
- Winning Captain: Padraig Coyle (Seneschalstown)
- Man of the Match: Padraig Coyle (Seneschalstown)

The 1994 Meath Senior Football Championship is the 102nd edition of the Meath GAA's premier club Gaelic football tournament for senior graded teams in County Meath, Ireland. The tournament consists of 16 teams, with the winner going on to represent Meath in the Leinster Senior Club Football Championship. The championship starts with a group stage and then progresses to a knock out stage.

This was Carnaross' return to the grade after claiming the 1993 Meath Intermediate Football Championship title.

Skryne were the defending champions after they defeated Navan O'Mahonys in the previous years final, however they were denied a "3-in-a-row" of titles when they were defeated by Seneschalstown in the final 1–11 to 0–12 in Pairc Tailteann on 2 October 1994. This was their 2nd time to claim the Keegan Cup (22 years after their first). Padraig Coyle raised the Keegan Cup and was also named as 'Man of the Match' for the Yellow Furze outfit. Seneschalstown went on to reach the Leinster S.C.F.C. final however they were narrowly beaten by Dublin champions Kilmacud Crokes.

== Team changes ==
The following teams have changed division since the 1993 championship season.

=== To S.F.C. ===
Promoted from I.F.C.

- Carnaross - (Intermediate Champions)

=== From S.F.C. ===
Regraded to I.F.C.

- None

== Group stage ==
=== Group A ===
Team	Pld	W	L	D	PF	PA	PD	Pts
Dunderry	5	5	0	0	0	0	+0	10
St. Peter's Dunboyne's	5	4	1	0	0	0	+0	8
Carnaross	5	3	2	0	0	0	+0	6
St. Colmcille's	5	2	3	0	0	0	+0	4
Slane	5	1	4	0	0	0	+0	2
St. Colmcille's	5	0	5	0	0	0	+0	0

Round 1

- Carnaross 0-12, 1-7 Gaeil Colmcille, Kells, 8/4/1994,
- Dunderry 0-10, 0-6 Slane, Castletown, 10/4/1994,
- St. Peter's Dunboyne 2-14, 1-9 St. Colmcille's, Rathkenny, 10/4/1994,

Round 2

- Dunderry 1-15, 2-8 St. Peter's Dunboyne, Dunshaughlin, 8/5/1994,
- Gaeil Colmcille w, l St. Colmcille's, Walterstown, 8/5/1994,
- Carnaross 1-7, 0-5 Slane, Castletown, 8/5/1994,

Round 3

- Slane w, l St. Colmcille's, Donore, 27/5/1994,
- St. Peter's Dunboyne 0-11, 0-9 Gaeil Colmcille, Walterstown, 28/5/1994,
- Dunderry 2-11, 2-6 Carnaross, Kells, 28/5/1994,

Round 4

- St. Peter's Dunbooyne 0-16, 1-8 Slane, Pairc Tailteann, 10/7/1994,
- Carnaross 1-15, 2-7 St. Colmcille's, Rathkenny, 13/7/1994,
- Dunderry 2-8, 0-11 Gaeil Colmcille, Martry, 13/7/1994,

Round 5

- St. Peter's Dunboyne 0-17, 1-2 Carnaross, 20/8/1994,
- Dunderry w/o, scr St. Colmcille's,
- Slane w, l Gaeil Colmcille,

=== Group B ===
Team	Pld	W	L	D	PF	PA	PD	Pts
Trim	4	3	0	1	0	0	+0	7
Summerhill	4	2	1	1	0	0	+0	5
Navan O'Mahonys	4	2	1	1	0	0	+0	5
St. Michael's	4	1	3	0	0	0	+0	2
Oldcastle	4	0	3	1	0	0	+0	1

Round 1

- Trim 0–6, 0-6 Summerhill, Kilmessan, 10/4/1994,
- Navan O'Mahonys 1–12, 2-9 Oldcastle, Ballinlough, 10/4/1994,
- St. Michael's - Bye,

Round 2

- Navan O'Mahonys 1-11, 0-7 St. Michael's, Kells, 8/5/1994,
- Summerhill w, l Oldcastle, 8/5/1994,
- Trim - Bye,

Round 3

- Trim 1-8, 0-10 St. Michael's, Martry, 27/5/1994,
- Navan O'Mahonys 1-10, 1-8 Summerhill, Kilmessan, 27/5/1994,
- Oldcastle - Bye,

Round 4

- St. Michael's w, l Oldcastle, Ballinlough, 9/7/1994,
- Trim 1-7, 0-9 Navan O'Mahonys, Athboy, 10/7/1994,
- Summerhill - Bye,

Round 5

- Summerhill w, l St. Michael's,
- Trim w, l Oldcastle, Athboy, 20/8/1994,
- Navan O'Mahonys - Bye,

Quarter-final Playoff:

- Summerhill 1-7, 1-4 Navan O'Mahonys, Dunshaughlin, 28/8/1994,

=== Group C ===
Team	Pld	W	L	D	PF	PA	PD	Pts
Seneschalstown	4	4	0	0	0	0	+0	8
Skryne	4	2	1	1	0	0	+0	5
Walterstown	4	2	1	1	0	0	+0	5
Moynalvey	4	1	3	0	0	0	+0	2
Ballinlough	4	0	4	0	0	0	+0	0

Round 1

- Skryne 2-11, 0-13 Moynalvey, Trim, 10/4/1994,
- Seneschalstown 1-13, 2-5 Walterstown, Stamullen, 10/4/1994,
- Ballinlough - Bye,

Round 2

- Seneschalstown 1-9, 0-3 Ballinlough, Kells, 8/5/1994,
- Walterstown w, l Moynalvey,
- Skryne - Bye,

Round 3

- Skryne 0–5, 0-5 Walterstown, Slane, 28/5/1994,
- Moynalvey 1-15, 1-14 Ballinlough, Walterstown, 29/5/1994,
- Seneschalstown - Bye,

Round 4

- Walterstown 1-11, 1-8 Ballinlough, Pairc Tailteann, 10/7/1994,
- Seneschalstown 1-11, 0-13 Skryne, Pairc Tailteann, 10/7/1994,
- Moynalvey - Bye,

Round 5

- Skryne 0-11, 1-1 Ballinlough, Kilberry, 18/8/1994,
- Seneschalstown 1-13, 0-9 Moynalvey, Pairc Tailteann, 21/8/1994,
- Walterstown - Bye,

Quarter-final Playoff:

- Skryne 2-12, 0-6 Walterstown, Pairc Tailteann, 28/8/1994,

== Knock-out Stages ==
The teams in the quarter-finals are the second placed teams from each group and the Group C winner. The teams in the semi-finals are Group A and B winners along with the quarter-final winners.

Quarter-Finals
Skryne	1-11
St. Peter's Dunboyne's	2-5
Seneschalstown	1-12
Summerhill	0-10

Semi-Finals
Trim	0-9
Skryne	1-12
Dunderry	1-12
Seneschalstown	1-14

Final
Skryne	0-12
Seneschalstown	1-11

Quarter-finals:

- Seneschalstown 1-12, 0-10 Summerhill, Pairc Tailteann, 4/9/1994,
- Skryne 1-11, 2-5 St. Peter's Dunboyne, Pairc Tailteann, 4/9/1994,

Semi-finals:

- Seneschalstown 1-14, 1-12 Dunderry, Pairc Tailteann, 11/9/1994,
- Skryne 1-12, 0-9 Trim, Pairc Tailteann, 11/9/1994,

Final:

- Seneschalstown 1-11, 0-12 Skryne, Pairc Tailteann, 2/10/1994,

== Leinster Senior Club Football Championship ==
Quarter-final:

- Sarsfields 0–8, 0-13 Seneschalstown, St. Conleth's Park, 6/11/1994,

Semi-final:

- Seneschalstown 1–11, 1-11 St Joseph's, St. Conleth's Park, 20/11/1994,
- Seneschalstown 1-11, 1-3 St Joseph's, St. Conleth's Park, 27/11/1994,

Final:

- * Seneschalstown 1–8, 0-12 Kilmacud Crokes, St. Conleth's Park, 4/12/1994,
