= 1997 Meath Intermediate Football Championship =

Meath I.F.C.
- Season: 1997
- Champions: Dunshaughlin; 2nd Intermediate Football Championship title

The 1997 Meath Intermediate Football Championship was the 71st edition of the Meath GAA's premier club Gaelic football tournament for intermediate graded teams in County Meath, Ireland. The tournament consisted of 16 teams, with the winner going on to represent Meath in the Leinster Intermediate Club Football Championship. The championship started with a group stage and then progressed to a knock out stage.

1997 was St. Colmcille's first year in the Intermediate grade since 1988, after 8 years in the Senior grade since being regraded in 1996.

Drumconrath were promoted after claiming the 1996 Meath Junior Football Championship title.

On 5 October 1997, Dunshaughlin claimed their 2nd Intermediate championship title when they defeated Duleek 3–14 to 1–6 in the final and hence ended their 15-year exodus from the top flight.

== Team changes ==
The following teams changed division since the 1996 championship season.

=== From I.F.C. ===
Promoted to S.F.C.

- Cortown - (Intermediate Champions)

Regraded to 1997 J.A.F.C.

- Gaeil Colmcille 'B'
- St. Mary's Donore

=== To I.F.C. ===
Regraded from S.F.C.

- St. Colmcille's

Promoted from J.A.F.C.

- Drumconrath - (Junior 'A' Champions)

== Group stage ==
There were 3 groups called Group A, B and C. The 2 top finishers in Group A and B qualified for the semi-finals. First place in Group C and runners up in each group qualified for the quarter-finals. In the event of two teams being level on points and only one qualification spot available, a playoff was to be conducted to determine final placings.

=== Group A ===
Team	Pld	W	L	D	PF	PA	PD	Pts
Dunshaughlin	5	4	0	1	74	53	+21	9
Drumconrath	5	3	1	1	56	43	+13	7
Donaghmore/Ashbourne	5	3	1	1	48	46	+2	7
Ballivor	5	2	3	0	39	43	-4	4
Syddan	5	1	4	0	57	64	-7	2
Moynalty	5	0	5	0	42	67	-25	0

Round 1:

- Dunshaughlin 1-10, 1-7 Drumconrath, Rathkenny, 5/4/1997,
- Donaghmore/Ashbourne 0-10, 0-8 Moynalty, Kilberry, 6/4/1997,
- Ballivor 2-9, 1-7 Syddan, Martry, 6/4/1997,

Round 2:

- Drumconrath 0–13, 1-10 Moynalty, Nobber, 19/4/1997,
- Donaghmore/Ashbourne 2-8, 1-10 Syddan, Seneschalstown, 20/4/1997,
- Dunshaughlin 0-10, 0-9 Ballivor, Trim, 20/4/1997,

Round 3:

- Drumconrath 0-12, 1-4 Ballivor, ???, 4/5/1997,
- Dunshaughlin 0–9, 0-9 Donaghmore/Ashbourne, Skryne, 4/5/1997,
- Syddan 1-13, 0-8 Moynalty, Kells, 18/5/1997,

Round 4:

- Donaghmore/Ashbourne 1-8, 0-8 Ballivor, Walterstown, 20/6/1997,
- Drumconrath 0-13, 0-6 Syddan, Meath Hill, 21/6/1997,
- Dunshaughlin 6-10, 1-10 Moynalty, Kilberry, 22/6/1997,

Round 5:

- Drumconrath 0-8, 0-4 Donaghmore/Ashbourne, Slane, 12/7/1997,
- Dunshaughlin 0-14, 1-9 Syddan, Kilberry, 12/7/1997,
- Ballivor w/o, scr Moynalty,

Quarter-final Playoff:

- Drumconrath 0-11, 2-4 Donaghmore/Ashbourne, Slane, 24/8/1997,

=== Group B ===
Team	Pld	W	L	D	PF	PA	PD	Pts
Duleek	4	4	0	0	53	40	+13	8
Blackhall Gaels	4	3	1	0	50	40	+10	6
St. Patrick's	4	2	2	0	61	51	+10	4
Rathkenny	4	1	3	0	20	34	-14	2
St. Colmcille's	4	0	4	0	25	44	-19	0

Round 1:

- Duleek 1-10, 0-7 St. Colmcille's, Bellewstown, 6/4/1997,
- Blackhall Gaels 2-10, 2-9 St. Patrick's, Skryne, 6/4/1997,
- Rathkenny - Bye

Round 2:

- Blackhall Gaels 1-7, 0-5 Rathkenny, Walterstown, 14/4/1997,
- St. Patrick's 2-11, 1-6 St. Colmcille's, Duleek, 20/4/1997,
- Duleek - Bye,

Round 3:

- Duleek 1-8, 0-7 Rathkenny, Seneschalstown, 4/5/1997,
- Blackhall Gaels 0-14, 0-9 St. Colmcille's, Walterstown, 4/5/1997,
- St. Patrick's - Bye,

Round 4:

- St. Patrick's 1-10, 1-5 Rathkenny, Donore, 18/5/1997,
- Duleek 1-8, 0-10 Blackhall Gaels, Skryne, 18/5/1997,
- St. Colmcille's - Bye,

Round 5:

- Duleek 2-12, 2-10 St. Patrick's, Pairc Tailteann, 24/8/1997,
- Ratheknny w/o, scr St. Colmcille's,
- Blackhall Gaels - Bye,

=== Group C ===
Team	Pld	W	L	D	PF	PA	PD	Pts
St. Ultan's	4	4	0	0	72	53	+19	8
Castletown	4	3	1	0	70	38	+32	6
St. Brigid's Ballinacree	4	1	2	1	55	58	-3	3
Athboy	4	1	2	1	30	58	-28	3
Ballinabrackey	4	0	4	0	38	59	-21	0

Round 1:

- St. Ultan's 2-13, 3-7 Ballinabrackey, Longwood, 6/4/1997,
- Castletown 2-19, 0-9 Athboy, Carlanstown, 6/4/1997,
- St. Brigid's - Bye,

Round 2:

- St. Ultan's 2-13, 1-14 St. Brigid's, Ballinlough, 19/4/1997,
- Castletown 1-16, 0-11 Ballinabrackey, Athboy, 20/4/1997,
- Athboy - Bye,

Round 3:

- St. Brigid's 0–11, 2-5 Athboy, Kilskyre, 3/5/1997,
- St. Ultan's 1-9, 1-7 Castletown, Kilberry, 4/5/1997,
- Ballinabrackey - Bye,

Round 4:

- St. Ultan's 4-10, 1-7 Athboy, Cortown, 17/5/1997,
- St. Brigid's 1-18, 1-8 Ballinabrackey, Ballivor, 17/5/1997,
- Castletown - Bye,

Round 5:

- Castletown 1-13, 0-6 St. Brigid's, Kells, 8/6/1997,
- Athboy w/o, scr Ballinabrackey,
- St. Ultan's - Bye,

== Knock-out Stages ==
=== Finals ===
The teams in the quarter-finals are the second placed teams from each group and the Group C winner. The teams in the semi-finals are Group A and B winners along with the quarter-final winners.

Quarter-Finals
St. Ultan's	0-7
Blackhall Gaels	1-13
Castletown	1-8
Drumconrath	1-11 R

Semi-Finals
Dunshaughlin	2-13
Blackhall Gaels	1-12
Duleek	2-9
Drumconrath	0-14

Final
Dunshaughlin	3-14
Duleek	1-6

Quarter-final:

- Drumconrath 0–9, 0-9 Castletown, Syddan, 30/8/1997,
- Blackhall Gaels 1-13, 0-7 St. Ultan's, Skryne, 31/8/1997,

Quarter-final Replay:

- Drumconrath 1-11, 1-8 Castletown, Syddan, 7/9/1997,

Semi-final:

- Dunshaughlin 2-13, 1-12 Blackhall Gaels, Pairc Tailteann, 7/9/1997,
- Duleek 2-9, 0-14 Drumconrath, Pairc Tailteann, 21/9/1997,

Final:

- Dunshaughlin 3-14, 1-6 Duleek, Pairc Tailteann, 5/10/1997.
