= 1995 Meath Intermediate Football Championship =

Meath I.F.C.
- Season: 1995
- Champions: Simonstown Gaels; 1st Intermediate Football Championship title
- Relegated: None
- Matches: ??

The 1995 Meath Intermediate Football Championship is the 69th edition of the Meath GAA's premier club Gaelic football tournament for intermediate graded teams in County Meath, Ireland. The tournament consists of 17 teams. The championship starts with a group stage and then progresses to a knock out stage.

This was St. Brigid's Ballinacree's debut in the middle grade as they were promoted from the J.F.C. after claiming the 1994 Meath Junior Football Championship title.

On 24 September 1995, Simonstown Gaels claimed their 1st Intermediate championship title when they defeated Castletown 0–16 to 2–9 in the final at Pairc Tailteann.

== Team changes ==
The following teams have changed division since the 1994 championship season.

=== From I.F.C. ===
Promoted to S.F.C.

- Kilmainhamwood - (Intermediate Champions)

Relegated to 1995 J.A.F.C.

- Dunsany
- Meath Hill
- Navan O'Mahonys 'B'
- Nobber

=== To I.F.C. ===
Regraded from S.F.C.

- None

Promoted from 1994 J.A.F.C.

- St. Brigid's Ballinacree - (Junior 'A' Champions)
- Blackhall Gaels - (New club formed in 1995 from Junior clubs Batterstown and Kilcloon. Chose to play in the Intermediate grade this year.)

== Group stage ==
There are 4 groups called Group A, B, C and D. The top two finishers in all groups will qualify for the quarter-finals.

=== Group A ===
Team	Pld	W	L	D	PF	PA	PD	Pts
Simonstown Gaels	5	4	0	1	0	0	+0	9
Ballinabrackey	5	3	2	0	0	0	+0	6
Blackhall Gaels	5	2	2	1	0	0	+0	5
Cortown	5	1	2	2	0	0	+0	4
Gaeil Colmcille 'B'	5	2	3	0	0	0	+0	4
Ballivor	5	0	5	0	0	0	+0	0

Round 1:

- Blackhall Gaels 1-11, 2-3 Gaeil Colmcille 'B', 16/4/1995,
- Simonstown Gaels 0–10, 1-7 Cortown, 16/4/1995,
- Ballinabrackey 4-11, 1-6 Ballivor, 16/4/1995,

Round 2:

- Gaeil Colmcille 'B' 0-13, 0-12 Cortown, 30/4/1995,
- Simonstown 1-15, 0-7 Ballivor, 30/4/1995,
- Ballinabrackey 2-10, 2-8 Blackhall Gaels, 30/4/1995,

Round 3:

- Gaeil Colmcille 'B' 2-8, 2-6 Ballivor, 14/5/1995,
- Simonstown Gaels 1-15, 0-5 Ballinabrackey, 14/5/1995,
- Blackhall Gaels 0–9, 0-9 Cortown, 14/5/1995,

Round 4:

- Ballinabrackey 2-4, 1-5 Cortown, 4/6/1995,
- Blackhall Gaels w/o, scr Ballivor, 11/6/1995,
- Simonstown Gaels 2-11, 0-6 Gaeil Colmcille 'B', 25/6/1995,

Round 5:

- Simonstown Gaels 4-9, 1-11 Blackhall Gaels, 2/7/1995,
- Cortown w/o, scr Ballivor,
- Ballinabrackey w, l Gaeil Colmcille 'B',

=== Group B ===
Team	Pld	W	L	D	PF	PA	PD	Pts
Castletown	5	4	1	0	0	0	+0	8
St. Patrick's	5	4	1	0	0	0	+0	8
Dunshaughlin	5	4	1	0	0	0	+0	8
St. Brigid's Ballinacree	5	1	3	1	0	0	+0	3
St. Ultan's	5	1	3	1	0	0	+0	3
Moynalty	5	0	5	0	0	0	+0	2

Round 1:

- St. Patrick's 0-11, 1-6 Castletown, 16/4/1995,
- Dunshaughlin 0-9, 0-5 Moynalty, 16/4/1995,
- St. Ultan's 0–9, 1-6 St. Brigid's, 16/4/1995,

Round 2:

- Castletown 3-9, 3-6 St. Ultan's, 30/4/1995,
- St. Brigid's 2-6, 0-7 Moynalty, 30/4/1995,
- Dunshaughlin 0-11, 1-7 St. Patrick's, 30/4/1995,

Round 3:

- St. Patrick's 0-10, 1-1 Moynalty, 14/5/1995,
- Dunshaughlin 2-16, 0-12 St. Ultan's, 14/5/1995,
- Castletown 2-12, 1-5 St. Brigid's, 28/5/1995,

Round 4:

- Dunshaughlin 1-15, 0-4 St. Brigid's, 11/6/1995,
- St. Patrick's 5-9, 1-7 St. Ultan's, 18/6/1995,
- Castletown 1-13, 0-5 Moynalty, 18/6/1995,

Round 5:

- Castletown 0-10, 1-4 Moynalty, 2/7/1995,
- St. Patrick's w, l St. Brigid's,
- St. Ultan's w, l Moynalty,

Quarter-final Playoff:

- Castletown w, l St. Patrick's,
- St. Patrick's w, l Dunshaughlin,

=== Group C ===
Team	Pld	W	L	D	PF	PA	PD	Pts
Rathkenny	4	4	0	0	0	0	+0	8
Syddan	4	3	1	0	0	0	+0	6
St. Mary's Donore	4	2	2	0	0	0	+0	4
Donaghmore	4	1	3	0	0	0	+0	2
Athboy	4	0	4	0	0	0	+0	0

Round 1:

- Syddan 1-7, 0-8 Donaghmore,
- St. Mary's 1-14, 1-8 Athboy, 16/4/1995,
- Rathkenny - Bye,

Round 2:

- Rathkenny 1-11, 2-4 St. Mary's, 30/4/1995,
- Donaghmore w, l Athboy,
- Syddan - Bye,

Round 3:

- Rathkenny 1-12, 0-6 Syddan, 14/5/1995,
- St. Mary's w, l Donaghmore,
- Athboy - Bye,

Round 4:

- Syddan 1-6, 0-6 St. Mary's, 11/6/1995,
- Rathkenny 4-13, 1-8 Athboy, 18/6/1995,
- Donaghmore - Bye,

Round 5:

- Rathkenny 1-9, 0-4 Donaghmore, 16/7/1995,
- Syddan 0-16, 0-4 Athboy, 16/7/1995,
- St. Mary's - Bye,

== Knock-out Stages ==
=== Finals ===
The teams in the quarter-finals are the second placed teams from each group and the Group A winner. The teams in the semi-finals are Group B and C winners along with the quarter-final winners.

Quarter-Finals
Rathkenny	1-10
St. Patrick's	0-6
Ballinabrackey	0-6
Syddan	1-9

Semi-Finals
Simonstown Gaels	2-9
Rathkenny	0-2
Syddan	1-8
Castletown	1-9

Final
Simonstown Gaels	0-16
Castletown	2-9

Quarter-final:

- Syddan 1-9, 0-6 Ballinabrackey, 27/8/1995,
- Rathkenny 1-10, 0-6 St. Patrick's, 27/8/1995,

Semi-final:

- Simonstown Gaels 2-9, 0-2 Rathkenny, 10/9/1995,
- Castletown 1-9, 1-8 Syddan, 10/9/1995,

Final:

- Simonstown Gaels 0-16, 2-9 Castletown, Pairc Tailteann, 24/10/1995,
