= 1995 Meath Senior Football Championship =

Meath S.F.C.
- Season: 1995
- Champions: Dunderry; 1st Senior Championship Title
- Relegated: None
- Leinster SCFC: Dunderry (Semi-Final) An Tóchar 1-13, 1-12 Dunderry'
- All Ireland SCFC: n/a
- Winning Captain: John Brady (Dunderry)
- Man of the Match: Tommy Dowd (Dunderry)

The 1995 Meath Senior Football Championship is the 103rd edition of the Meath GAA's premier club Gaelic football tournament for senior graded teams in County Meath, Ireland. The tournament consists of 17 teams, with the winner going on to represent Meath in the Leinster Senior Club Football Championship. The championship starts with a group stage and then progresses to a knock out stage.

This was Kilmainhamwood's return to the grade after a 9-year exodus claiming the 1994 Meath Intermediate Football Championship title.

Seneschalstown were the defending champions after they defeated Skryne in the previous years final, however they bowed out at the semi-final stage to the eventual champions.

Dunderry claimed their 1st S.F.C. title when beating Kilmainhamwood 1–11 to 0–10 in the final at Pairc Tailteann on 1 October 1995. John Brady raised the Keegan Cup for Dunderry while Tommy Dowd claimed the 'Man of the Match' award.

== Team changes ==
The following teams have changed division since the 1994 championship season.

=== To S.F.C. ===
Promoted from I.F.C.

- Kilmainhamwood - (Intermediate Champions)

=== From S.F.C. ===
Regraded to I.F.C.

- None

== Participating teams ==
The teams participating in the 1995 Meath Senior Football Championship are:

Club	Location	1994 Championship Position	1995 Championship Position
Ballinlough	Ballinlough & Kilskyre	Non Qualifier	Non Qualifier
Carnaross	Carnaross	Non Qualifier	Non Qualifier
Dunderry	Dunderry & Robinstown	Semi-Finalist	Champions
Gaeil Colmcille	Kells	Non Qualifier	Non Qualifier
Kilmainhamwood	Kilmainhamwood	I.F.C Champions	Finalist
Moynalvey	Moynalvey & Kiltale	Non Qualifier	Non Qualifier
Navan O'Mahonys	Navan	Non Qualifier	Non Qualifier
Oldcastle	Oldcastle	Non Qualifier	Non Qualifier
Seneschalstown	Kentstown & Yellow Furze	Champions	Semi-Finalist
Skryne	Skryne & Tara	Finalist	Non Qualifier
Slane	Slane & Monknewtown	Non Qualifier	Semi-Finalist
St. Colmcille's	Bettystown, Donacarney, Laytown & Mornington	Non Qualifier	Non Qualifier
St. Michael's	Carlanstown & Kilbeg	Non Qualifier	Non Qualifier
St. Peter's Dunboyne	Dunboyne	Quarter-Finalist	Quarter-Finalist
Summerhill	Summerhill	Quarter-Finalist	Quarter-Finalist
Trim	Trim	Semi-Finalist	Non Qualifier
Walterstown	Navan	Non Qualifier	Non Qualifier

== Group stage ==
=== Group A ===
Team	Pld	W	L	D	PF	PA	PD	Pts
Seneschalstown	5	4	0	1	0	0	+0	9
St. Peter's Dunboyne	5	3	1	1	0	0	+0	7
Navan O'Mahonys	5	3	2	0	0	0	+0	6
St. Michael's	5	1	3	1	0	0	+0	3
Ballinlough	5	1	3	1	0	0	+0	3
Gaeil Colmcille	5	0	3	2	0	0	+0	2

Round 1

- St. Peter's Dunboyne 2-13, 0-6 Gaeil Colmcille, 16/4/1995,
- St. Michael's 1-6, 1-4 Ballinlough, 16/4/1995,
- Seneschalstown 2-15, 1-8 Navan O'Mahonys, 16/4/1995,

Round 2

- Navan O'Mahonys 0-9, 0-7 St. Michael's, 30/4/1995,
- St. Peter's Dunboyne 0–11, 1-8 Ballinlough, 30/4/1995,
- Seneschalstown 3–5, 1-11 Gaeil Colmcille, 30/4/1995,

Round 3

- St. Peter's Dunboyne 1-11, 0-5 Navan O'Mahonys, 14/5/1995,
- Seneschalstown 3-13, 1-5 St. Michael's, 14/5/1995,
- Ballinlough 1-8, 2-4 Gaeil Colmcille, 14/5/1995,

Round 4

- St. Michael's 0–8, 1-5 Gaeil Colmcille, 18/6/1995,
- Seneschalstown 0-13, 1-5 St. Peter's Dunboyne, 18/6/1995,
- Navan O'Mahonys 1-14, 1-9 Ballinlough, 18/6/1995,

Round 5

- Seneschalstown 2-13, 3-4 Ballinlough, 9/7/1995,
- St. Peter's Dunboyne 0-11, 0-6 St. Michael's, 9/7/1995,
- Navan O'Mahonys 1-9, 0-9 Gaeil Colmcille, 9/7/1995,

=== Group B ===
Team	Pld	W	L	D	PF	PA	PD	Pts
Slane	5	5	0	0	0	0	+0	10
Summerhill	5	4	1	0	0	0	+0	8
Walterstown	5	3	2	0	0	0	+0	6
Oldcastle	5	1	4	0	0	0	+0	2
St. Colmcille's	5	1	4	0	0	0	+0	2
Trim	5	1	4	0	0	0	+0	2

Round 1

- Slane 0-10, 0-9 Summerhill, 16/4/1995,
- Trim 0-12, 1-5 St. Colmcille's, 16/4/1995,
- Walterstown 1-7, 0-8 Oldcastle, 16/4/1995,

Round 2

- Slane 1-8, 0-6 Oldcastle, 30/4/1995,
- Walterstown 0-12, 0-10 Trim, 7/5/1995,
- Summerhill 0-18, 0-6 St. Colmcille's, 7/5/1995,

Round 3

- Slane 0-8, 0-4 Trim, 14/5/1995,
- Summerhill 2-18, 0-8 Oldcastle, 14/5/1995,
- Walterstown 0-12, 0-5 St. Colmcille's, 4/6/1995,

Round 4

- Slane 1-11, 2-6 St. Colmcille's, 18/6/1995,
- Oldcastle 2-10, 1-8 Trim, 18/6/1995,
- Summerhill 1-8, 0-8 Walterstown, 18/6/1995,

Round 5

- Slane 0-10, 0-6 Walterstown, 2/7/1995,
- St. Colmcille's 0-14, 0-6 Oldcastle, 9/7/1995,
- Summerhill 0-17, 0-11 Trim, 9/7/1995,

=== Group C ===
Team	Pld	W	L	D	PF	PA	PD	Pts
Kilmainhamwood	4	4	0	0	0	0	+0	8
Dunderry	4	3	1	0	0	0	+0	6
Skryne	4	2	2	0	0	0	+0	4
Moynalvey	4	1	2	1	0	0	+0	3
Carnaross	4	0	4	0	0	0	+0	0

Round 1:

- Skryne 0-13, 0-8 Moynalvey, 16/4/1995,
- Kilmainhamwood 1-15, 1-11 Dunderry, 16/4/1995,
- Carnaross - Bye,

Round 2:

- Skryne 0-14, 1-10 Carnaross, 7/5/1995,
- Kilmainhamwood 1-11, 1-4 Moynalvey, 7/5/1995,
- Dunderry - Bye,

Round 3:

- Kilmainhamwood 1-13, 1-12 Skryne, 18/6/1995,
- Dunderry 2-9, 2-8 Carnaross, 18/6/1995,
- Moynalvey - Bye,

Round 4:

- Moynalvey 3-7, 0-10 Carnaross, 9/7/1995,
- Dunderry 0-10, 1-5 Skryne, 9/7/1995,
- Kilmainhamwood - Bye,

Round 5:

- Kilmainhamwood w, l Carnaross, 27/8/1995,
- Dunderry 1–12, 2-9 Moynalvey, 27/8/1995,
- Skryne - Bye,

== Knock-out Stages ==
The teams in the quarter-finals are the second placed teams from each group and the Group C winner. The teams in the semi-finals are Group A and B winners along with the quarter-final winners.

Quarter-Finals
Dunderry	2-12
Summerhill	2-7
Kilmainhamwood	2-8
St. Peter's Dunboyne	0-9

Semi-Finals
Seneschalstown	2-7
Dunderry	1-12
Slane	1-3
Kilmainhamwood	1-8

Final
Dunderry	1-11
Kilmainhamwood	0-10

Quarter-finals:

- Kilmainhamwood 2-8, 0-9 St. Peter's Dunboyne, 27/8/1995,
- Dunderry 2-12, 2-7 Summerhill, 3/9/1995,

Semi-finals:

- Kilmainhamwood 1-8, 1-3 Slane, 10/9/1995,
- Dunderry 1-12, 2-7 Seneschalstown, 10/9/1995,

Final:

- Dunderry 1-11, 0-10 Kilmainhamwood, Pairc Tailteann, 1/10/1995,

== Leinster Senior Club Football Championship ==
Quarter-final:

- Dunderry 1-10, 0-8 Mullingar Shamrocks, Pairc Tailteann, 28/10/1995,

Semi-final:

- An Tóchar 1-13, 1-12 Dunderry, St. Conleth's Park, 19/11/1995,
