= 1992 Meath Intermediate Football Championship =

Meath I.F.C.
- Season: 1992
- Champions: St. Peter's Dunboyne; 2nd Intermediate Football Championship title
- Relegated: None
- Matches: ??

The 1992 Meath Intermediate Football Championship is the 66th edition of the Meath GAA's premier club Gaelic football tournament for intermediate graded teams in County Meath, Ireland. The tournament consists of 20 teams. The championship starts with a group stage and then progresses to a knock out stage.

This was Carnaross' return to the grade as they were promoted from the J.F.C. after claiming the 1991 Meath Junior Football Championship title.

On 27 September 1992, St. Peter's Dunboyne claimed their 2nd Intermediate championship title (40 years after their first) when they defeated St. Patrick's 0–8 to 0–4 in the final at Pairc Tailteann.

== Team changes ==
The following teams have changed division since the 1991 championship season.

=== From I.F.C. ===
Promoted to S.F.C.

- Ballinlough - (Intermediate Champions)

Relegated to 1992 J.A.F.C.

- Bellewstown

=== To I.F.C. ===
Regraded from S.F.C.

- Castletown
- Nobber

Promoted from 1990 J.A.F.C.

- Carnaross - (Junior 'A' Champions)

== Group stage ==
There are 4 groups called Group A, B, C and D. The top two finishers in all groups will qualify for the quarter-finals.

=== Group A ===
Team	Pld	W	L	D	PF	PA	PD	Pts
St. Peter's Dunboyne	4	4	0	0	0	0	+0	8
Simonstown Gaels	4	3	1	0	0	0	+0	6
Rathkenny	4	2	2	0	0	0	+0	4
Donaghmore	4	1	3	0	0	0	+0	2
Meath Hill	4	0	4	0	0	0	+0	0

Round 1:

- Donaghmore 1-9, 1-6 Meath Hill, Seneschalstown, 5/4/1992,
- Simonstown Gaels 2-4, 0-7 Rathkenny, Dunderry, 5/4/1992,
- St. Peter's Dunboyne - Bye,

Round 2:

- Rathkenny 1-9, 0-6 Donaghmore, 3/5/1992,
- St. Peter's Dunboyne 1-17, 0-6 Simonstown Gaels, 3/5/1992,
- Meath Hill - Bye,

Round 3:

- Simonstown Gaels 0-9, 0-7 Donaghmore, 24/5/1992,
- St. Peter's Dunboyne 1-8, 1-4 Meath Hill, 14/6/1992,
- Rathkenny - Bye,

Round 4:

- St. Peter's Dunboyne w, l Rathkenny,
- Simonstown Gaels w, l Meath Hill,
- Donaghmore - Bye,

Round 5:

- St. Peter's Dunboyne w, l Donaghmore,
- Rathkenny w, l Meath Hill,
- Simonstown Gaels - Bye,

=== Group B ===
Team	Pld	W	L	D	PF	PA	PD	Pts
Ballinabrackey	4	3	0	1	0	0	+0	7
Ballivor	4	1	1	2	0	0	+0	4
Syddan	4	2	2	0	0	0	+0	4
Moynalty	4	1	1	2	0	0	+0	4
Athboy	4	0	3	1	0	0	+0	1

Round 1:

- Ballinabrackey 2-10, 0-10 Athboy, Summerhill, 5/4/1992,
- Ballivor 1–10, 1-10 Moynalty, Athboy, 5/4/1992,
- Syddan - Bye,

Round 2:

- Syddan 1-9, 0-7 Moynalty, Carlanstown, 3/5/1992,
- Ballivor 2–4, 0-10 Athboy, 3/5/1992,
- Ballinabrackey - Bye,

Round 3:

- Ballinabrackey 3-11, 1-8 Syddan, 17/5/1992,
- Moynalty 1-16, 0-5 Athboy, 21/6/1992,
- Ballivor - Bye,

Round 4:

- Ballivor 0-9, 0-6 Syddan, 31/5/1992,
- Ballinabrackey 2–9, 1-12 Moynalty, 5/7/1992,
- Athboy - Bye,

Round 5:

- Ballinabrackey 4-6, 0-11 Ballivor, 12/7/1992,
- Syddan w, l Athboy,
- Moynalty - Bye,

Quarter-final Playoff:

- Syddan w', l Moynalty,
- Ballivor 2-14, 1-6 Syddan, 18/7/1992,

=== Group C ===
Team	Pld	W	L	D	PF	PA	PD	Pts
St. Patrick's	4	4	0	0	0	0	+0	8
Dunshaughlin	4	3	1	0	0	0	+0	6
Carnaross	4	2	2	0	0	0	+0	4
Dunsany	4	1	3	0	0	0	+0	2
St. Mary's Donore	4	0	4	0	0	0	+0	0

Round 1:

- Dunshaughlin 1-13, 2-7 St. Mary's, Seneschalstown, 12/4/1992,
- St. Patrick's w, l Dunsany, Dunshaughlin, 14/4/1992,
- Carnaross - Bye,

Round 2:

- Dunshaughlin w, l Carnaross, Kilberry, 26/4/1992,
- Dunsany 2-7, 0-8 St. Mary's, 3/5/1992,
- St. Patrick's - Bye,

Round 3:

- St. Patrick's 1-6, 0-8 Carnaross, 3/5/1992,
- Dunshaughlin 1-11, 2-6 Dunsany, 14/6/1992,
- St. Mary's - Bye,

Round 4:

- Carnaross 0-9, 0-8 St. Mary's, 21/6/1992,
- St. Patrick's w, l Dunshaughlin,
- Dunsany - Bye,

Round 5:

- Carnaross w, l Dunsany,
- St. Patrick's w, l St. Mary's,
- Dunshaughlin - Bye,

=== Group D ===
Team	Pld	W	L	D	PF	PA	PD	Pts
Kilmainhamwood	4	4	0	0	0	0	+0	8
Castletown	4	3	1	0	0	0	+0	6
Nobber	4	2	2	0	0	0	+0	4
St. Ultan's	4	1	3	0	0	0	+0	2
Navan O'Mahonys 'B'	4	0	4	0	0	0	+0	0

Round 1:

- Nobber 1-7, 0-3 St. Ultan's, Kells, 5/4/1992,
- Kilmainhamwood 0-13, 1-5 Navan O'Mahonys 'B', Nobber, 12/4/1992,
- Castletown - Bye,

Round 2:

- Kilmainhamwood 1-12, 0-5 St. Ultan's, Kells, 3/5/1992,
- Castletown 2-9, 0-4 Navan O'Mahonys 'B', 3/5/1992,
- Nobber - Bye,

Round 3:

- Castletown 1-11, 0-8 Nobber, 31/5/1992,
- St. Ultan's 1-12, 1-6 Navan O'Mahonys 'B', 14/6/1992,
- Kilmainhamwood - Bye,

Round 4:

- Kilmainhamwood 1-10, 0-10 Castletown, 14/6/1992,
- Nobber w, l Navan O'Mahonys 'B',
- St. Ultan's - Bye,

Round 5:

- Kilmainhamwood 2-10, 1-10 Nobber, 5/7/1992,
- Castletown 3-10, 2-7 St. Ultan's, 5/7/1992,
- Navan O'Mahonys 'B' - Bye,

== Knock-out Stages ==
=== Finals ===
The teams in the quarter-finals are the top two finishers from each group.

Quarter-Finals
St. Peter's Dunboyne	1-9
Castletown	0-6
Ballinabrackey	2-5
Dunshaughlin	2-16
St. Patrick's	2-6
Ballivor	0-8
Kilmainhamwood	3-4
Simonstown Gaels	2-9

Semi-Finals
St. Peter's Dunboyne	1-13
Dunshaughlin	0-5
St. Patrick's	2-9
Simonstown Gaels	0-8

Final
St. Peter's Dunboyne	0-8
St. Patrick's	0-4

Quarter-final:

- Dunshaughlin 2-16, 2-5 Ballinabrackey, 19/7/1992,
- St. Peter's Dunboyne 1-9, 0-6 Castletown, 19/7/1992,
- Simonstown Gaels 2-9, 3-4 Kilmainhamwood, 19/7/1992,
- St. Patrick's 2-6, 0-8 Ballivor, 16/8/1992,

Semi-final:

- St. Peter's Dunboyne 1-13, 0-5 Dunshaughlin, 16/8/1992,
- St. Patrick's 2-9, 0-8 Simonstown Gaels, 30/8/1992,

Final:

- St. Peter's Dunboyne 0-8, 0-4 St. Patrick's, Pairc Tailteann, 27/9/1992,
