= 1992 Meath Senior Football Championship =

Meath S.F.C.
- Season: 1992
- Champions: Skryne; 9th Senior Championship Title
- Relegated: None
- Leinster SCFC: Skryne (???)
- All Ireland SCFC: n/a
- Winning Captain: Declan Browne (Skryne)
- Man of the Match: Padraig Finnerty (Skryne)

The 1992 Meath Senior Football Championship is the 100th edition of the Meath GAA's premier club Gaelic football tournament for senior graded teams in County Meath, Ireland. The tournament consists of 14 teams, with the winner going on to represent Meath in the Leinster Senior Club Football Championship. The championship starts with a group stage and then progresses to a knock out stage.

This was Ballinlough's return to the grade after claiming the 1991 Meath Intermediate Football Championship title.

Gaeil Colmcille were the defending champions after they defeated Walterstown in the previous years final, however they bowed out in the group stage with just only a draw to their name.

Skryne claimed their 9th S.F.C. title when beating Seneschalstown 1–7 to 0–7 in the final at Pairc Tailteann on 27 September 1992. Declan Browne raised the Keegan Cup for Skryne while Padraig Finnerty claimed the 'Man of the Match' award.

== Team changes ==
The following teams have changed division since the 1991 championship season.

=== To S.F.C. ===
Promoted from I.F.C.

- Ballinlough - (Intermediate Champions)

=== From S.F.C. ===
Regraded to I.F.C.

- Castletown
- Nobber

== Group stage ==
=== Group A ===
Team	Pld	W	L	D	PF	PA	PD	Pts
Skryne	4	3	1	0	38	48	-10	6
Dunderry	4	3	1	0	47	31	+16	6
Trim	4	1	2	1	39*	35*	+4*	3
Oldcastle	4	2	2	0	27*	30*	-3*	4
St. Colmcille's	4	0	3	1	28	35	-7	1

Round 1

- Trim 1-10, 0-7 Dunderry, Athboy, 4/4/1992,
- Skryne 2-8, 2-7 Oldcastle, Kilberry, 10/4/1992,
- St. Colmcille's - Bye,

Round 2

- St. Colmcille's 1–9, 1-9 Trim, 3/5/1992,
- Dunderry 4-9, 0-8 Skryne, 3/5/1992,
- Oldcastle - Bye,

Round 3

- Oldcastle 1-8, 1-6 St. Colmcille's, 31/5/1992,
- Skryne 2-10, 2-8 Trim, 14/6/1992,
- Dunderry - Bye,

Round 4

- Dunderry 0-12, 0-7 St. Colmcille's,
- Oldcastle w, l Trim,
- Skryne - Bye,

Round 5

- Dunderry 0-7, 0-3 Oldcastle, 5/7/1992,
- Skryne w/o, scr St. Colmcille's,
- Trim - Bye,

Quarter-final/Semi-final Playoff:

- Skryne 2-11, 1-6 Skryne, 19/7/1992,

=== Group B ===
Team	Pld	W	L	D	PF	PA	PD	Pts
Seneschalstown	4	3	0	1	37*	27*	+10*	7
Summerhill	4	2	1	1	29*	23*	+6*	5
Walterstown	4	2	1	1	34*	30*	+4*	5
Ballinlough	4	1	3	0	28*	46*	-18*	2
Gaeil Colmcille	4	0	3	1	18**	20**	-2**	1

Round 1

- Seneschalstown 1-10, 0-7 Ballinlough, Kells, 12/4/1992,
- Walterstown 0–6, 0-6 Summerhill, Dunshaughlin, 12/4/1992,
- Gaeil Colmcille - Bye,

Round 2

- Summerhill 1-6, 0-7 Gaeil Colmcille, Walterstown, 26/4/1992,
- Walterstown 2-13, 1-8 Ballinlough, 3/5/1992,
- Seneschalstown - Bye,

Round 3

- Seneschalstown 0–11, 1-8 Gaeil Colmcille, 3/5/1992,
- Summerhill 2-8, 0-10 Ballinlough, 14/6/1992,
- Walterstown - Bye,

Round 4

- Seneschalstown w, l Summerhill,
- Walterstown w, l Gaeil Colmcille,
- Ballinlough - Bye,

Round 5

- Seneschalstown 0-13, 1-6 Walterstown, 5/7/1992,
- Ballinlough w, l Gaeil Colmcille,
- Summerhill - Bye,

Quarter-final Playoff:

- Summerhill 0-12, 0-8 Walterstown, 19/7/1992,

=== Group C ===
Team	Pld	W	L	D	PF	PA	PD	Pts
Navan O'Mahonys	3	2	1	0	40	33	+7	4
Slane	3	2	1	0	32	38	-6	4
St. Michael's	3	2	1	0	38	25	+13	4
Moynalvey	3	0	3	0	35	49	-14	0

Round 1:

- Slane 3-7, 1-9 Moynalvey, Pairc Tailteann, 5/4/1992,
- St. Michael's 1-9, 0-7 Navan O'Mahonys, Nobber, 12/4/1992,

Round 2:

- Slane 1-8, 1-7 St. Michael's, 3/5/1992,
- Navan O'Mahonys 1-14, 2-10 Moynalvey, 3/5/1992,

Round 3:

- St. Michael's 2-10, 0-7 Moynalvey, 14/6/1992,
- Navan O'Mahonys 1-13, 0-5 Slane, 14/6/1992,

Semi-final Playoff:

- Navan O'Mahonys 3-9, 1-6 St. Michael's, 21/6/1992,

Quarter-final Playoff:

- Slane 1-10, 0-6 St. Michael's, 5/7/1992,

== Knock-out Stages ==
The teams in the quarter-finals are the second placed teams from each group and the Group C winner. The teams in the semi-finals are Group A and B winners along with the quarter-final winners.

Quarter-Finals
Navan O'Mahonys	w
Summerhill	l
Dunderry	2-10
Slane	0-11

Semi-Finals
Skryne	0-9 R
Navan O'Mahonys	0-4 R
Seneschalstown	0-16
Dunderry	1-8

Final
Skryne	1-7
Seneschalstown	0-7

Quarter-finals:

- Dunderry 2-10, 0-11 Slane, 16/8/1992,
- Navan O'Mahonys w, l Summerhill,

Semi-finals:

- Skryne 0–8, 1-5 Navan O'Mahonys, 30/8/1992,
- Seneschalstown 0-16, 1-8 Dunderry, 6/9/1992,

Semi-final Replay:

- Skryne 0-9, 0-4 Navan O'Mahonys, 6/9/1992,

Final:

- Skryne 1-7, 0-7 Seneschalstown, Pairc Tailteann, 27/9/1992,

== Leinster Senior Club Football Championship ==
Quarter-final:

- ???
