= Monknewtown =

Townland in County Meath, Ireland

- Baile Nua na Manach (Irish)
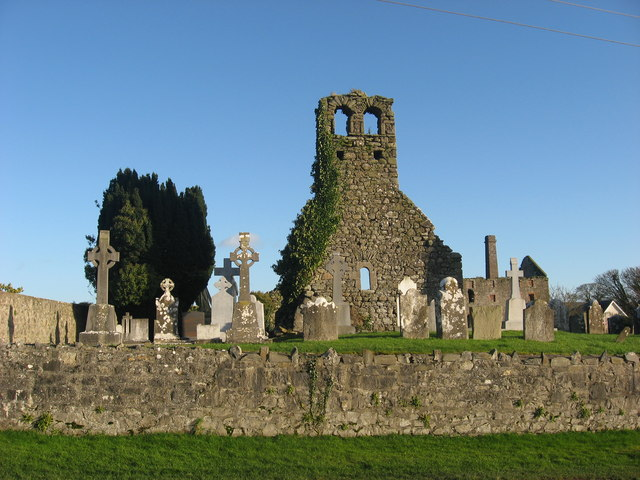
- Ruined medieval church at Monknewtown and graveyard

- Location within Ireland
- 53.721°N 6.488°W
- Type: henge, ritual pond
- Periods: Neolithic
- Location: valley of the River Boyne
- Region: County Meath, Ireland
- Part of: Brú na Bóinne

UNESCO World Heritage Site
- Type: Cultural
- Criteria: i, iii, iv
- Designated: 1993 (17th session)
- Part of: Brú na Bóinne - Archaeological Ensemble of the Bend of the Boyne
- Reference no.: 659
- Ireland
- Region: Europe and North America

Monknewtown (Irish: Baile Nua na Manach), historically called Rathenskin, is a townland 3 km east of Slane in County Meath, Ireland. It stands on the right bank of the Mattock River, which feeds several historic watermills nearby and which forms approximately the townland's eastern boundary with Keerhan and Sheepgrange townlands in County Louth. Neighbouring townlands to the south are Balfeddock, Knowth, and Crewbane, to the west Cashel, Mooretown, and Knockmooney. The northern boundary of Monknewtown with Kellystown is formed by a tributary of the Mattock River, while the southern boundary is formed by the N51 road. Other than the latter, only minor roads traverse the townland, among them L5606 from west to east. The townland is in a civil parish of the same name.

A ford crosses the Mattock River in the northeastern part of the townland, connecting Monknewtown with Keerhan.

Monknewtown also stands on the northern edge of the Neolithic monument complex and World Heritage Site of Brú na Bóinne which includes the famous site of Newgrange.

Two Neolithic sites connected with Monknewtown are the nearby "ritual pond" and a henge.

The pond probably dates to the later Neolithic, being a later addition to the complex, and consists of a 2 meter high earth bank that creates a 30-meter diameter enclosure that is filled with water.

The site may have played a preliminary or final role in prehistoric activities connected with the tombs and other ritual sites to the south.

== Sources ==
- Lewis-Williams, D. and Pearce, D., Inside the Neolithic Mind, Thames and Hudson, London, 2005, ISBN 0-500-05138-0
