= McEntee =

McEntee is an Irish surname. Notable people with the surname include:

- Andy McEntee, Irish Gaelic football manager
- Edward McEntee (1906–1981), American judge and politician
- Eugene McEntee (born 1978), Irish hurler
- Gerald McEntee, American labor leader
- Gerry McEntee, Irish Gaelic footballer
- Helen McEntee (born 1986), Irish politician
- James McEntee (Gaelic footballer), Irish Gaelic footballer
- James McEntee (labor leader) (1884–1957), American machinist and labor leader
- Jervis McEntee (1828–1891), American painter
- John McEntee (political aide), American political aide
- John McEntee Bowman (1875–1931), Canadian-born American businessman
- John McEntee (Gaelic footballer) (born 1977), Irish Gaelic footballer
- John McEntee (political aide) (born 1990), American staff member in the Trump administration
- Mark McEntee (born 1961), Australian musician
- Shane McEntee (Gaelic footballer), Irish Gaelic footballer
- Shane McEntee (politician) (1956–2012), Irish politician
- Valentine McEntee, 1st Baron McEntee (1871–1953), Irish-born British politician
- Seán MacEntee (1889–1984), Irish politician
