= 1991 Meath County Council election =

Part of the 1991 Irish local elections

← 1985	27 June 1991	1999 →

All 29 seats on Meath County Council
	First party	Second party	Third party
Party	Fianna Fáil	Fine Gael	Labour
Seats won	12	9	4
Seat change	-5	+2	+1
	Fourth party	Fifth party
Party	Workers' Party	Independent
Seats won	1	3
Seat change	+1	+1
- Map showing the area of Meath County Council
Council control after election
TBD

An election to Meath County Council took place on 27 June 1991 as part of that year's Irish local elections. 29 councillors were elected from five local electoral areas (LEAs) for a five-year term of office on the electoral system of proportional representation by means of the single transferable vote (PR-STV). This term was extended twice, first to 1998, then to 1999.

== Results by party ==
Party	Seats	±	First Pref. votes	FPv%	±%
Fianna Fáil	12	-5	17,408	44.81	
Fine Gael	9	+2	10,290	26.49	
Labour	4	+1	4,587	11.81	
Workers' Party	1	+1	1,080	2.78	
Independent	3	+1	3,101	7.98	
Totals	29	-	38,850	100.00	—

== Results by local electoral area ==
=== Dunshaughlin ===
Dunshaughlin - 5 seats
Party	Candidate	FPv%	Count							
Party	Candidate	FPv%	1	2	3	4	5	6	7	8
Fianna Fáil	Mary Wallace TD*	19.4%	1,469							
Labour	Brian Fitzgerald*	15.8%	1,196	1,214	1,262	1,326				
Fine Gael	Mary Sylver*	13.1%	994	1,009	1,014	1,030	1,039	1,157	1,198	1,230
Fianna Fáil	Conor Tormey	11.7%	885	949	953	969	971	994	1,109	1,192
Fine Gael	John Fanning	11.3%	855	862	876	882	883	984	1,151	1,184
Fianna Fáil	Tadhg Delaney*	8.1%	613	662	665	679	683	719	733	1,053
Fianna Fáil	Donal Clynch	6.1%	461	496	497	516	521	548	559	
Workers' Party	John King	5.5%	417	419	430	452	459	496		
Progressive Democrats	Joe Fernandez	5.0%	376	384	387	404	406			
Sinn Féin	Thomas McDonnell	2.9%	219	223	224					
Labour	Eamon Tuttle	1.3%	97	100						
Electorate: 15,984 Valid: 7,582 (47.43%) Spoilt: 88 Quota: 1,264 Turnout: 7,648 (47.85%)

=== Kells ===
Kells - 7 seats
Party	Candidate	FPv%	Count									
Party	Candidate	FPv%	1	2	3	4	5	6	7	8	9	10
Fianna Fáil	Michael Lynch*	16.6%	1,630	1,705								
Fine Gael	John V. Farrelly TD*	13.1%	1,293									
Fine Gael	Gerry Gibney	10.0%	980	1,069	1,078	1,097	1,101	1,119	1,122	1,130	1,130	1,180
Fianna Fáil	Johnny Brady*	9.5%	932	1,052	1,054	1,067	1,085	1,098	1,217	1,273		
Fianna Fáil	Sebastian Rooney*	7.9%	780	834	836	846	864	895	990	1,127	1,149	1,285
Fianna Fáil	James Weldon*	7.3%	717	750	755	762	772	789	815	1,162	1,176	1,212
Fianna Fáil	Fergus Muldoon*	7.0%	693	719	725	732	742	749	766			
Fine Gael	Tom Bradley*	6.8%	672	683	709	711	716	787	792	826	829	916
Independent	Jack Fitzsimons	6.6%	648	664	668	700	731	794	820	879	881	1,127
Labour	Tommy Grimes	6.2%	608	617	621	653	714	735	798	810	810	
Fianna Fáil	James O'Rourke	3.0%	300	324	325	330	360	367				
Progressive Democrats	Caroline Mhic Daeid	2.6%	254	258	259	262	265					
Independent	John Maguire	1.9%	187	194	195	202						
Sinn Féin	Patrick McCabe	1.6%	154	159	159							
Electorate: 16,291 Valid: 9,848 (60.45%) Spoilt: 104 Quota: 1,232 Turnout: 9,952 (61.09%)

=== Navan ===
Navan - 7 seats
Party	Candidate	FPv%	Count										
Party	Candidate	FPv%	1	2	3	4	5	6	7	8	9	10	11
Fianna Fáil	Paddy Fitzsimons*	11.8%	973	976	1,035								
Fine Gael	Patsy O'Neill*	8.9%	731	738	740	741	753	769	778	881	933	933	981
Fianna Fáil	Jimmy Mangan*	8.4%	689	692	713	715	730	743	816	832	889	891	897
Workers' Party	Christy Gorman	8.1%	663	685	694	709	735	852	887	917	969	969	970
Progressive Democrats	Patrick Andrews	7.3%	599	606	614	619	654	671	696	752			
Fine Gael	Noel Foley	7.1%	584	587	596	600	619	632	658	945	1,117		
Fianna Fáil	Owen Heaney*	6.8%	563	563	588	589	596	611	780	804	892	895	903
Fine Gael	Jim D'Arcy*	6.8%	561	566	566	571	579	601	610				
Independent	Patricia Hegarty	6.8%	556	572	576	796	825	866	904	934	1,024	1,025	1,033
Labour	Brendan Clusker*	6.5%	533	566	586	597	721	766	831	869	989	989	1,006
Sinn Féin	Joe Reilly	5.3%	435	440	443	449	459						
Fianna Fáil	Frank Carberry	5.2%	424	426	478	484	494	510					
Independent	Anthony McDonnell	3.3%	275	279	285								
Labour	Sean O'Brien	3.0%	245	305	307	310							
Fianna Fáil	Michael McGoona	2.7%	220	222									
Labour	Jim O'Brien	2.1%	176										
Electorate: 17,840 Valid: 8,227 (46.12%) Spoilt: 146 Quota: 1,029 Turnout: 8,288 (46.46%)

=== Slane ===
Slane - 5 seats
Party	Candidate	FPv%	Count							
Party	Candidate	FPv%	1	2	3	4	5	6	7	8
Independent	Gerald Marry*	20.5%	1,412							
Fine Gael	Tom Kelly*	12.6%	865	887	891	1,004	1,203			
Fianna Fáil	Hugh Gough	10.4%	718	752	919	926	999	1,008	1,099	1,127
Fine Gael	Shaun Lynch	10.0%	691	735	746	767	786	797	1,248	
Labour	Jimmy Cudden*	9.6%	659	719	730	921	946	960	1,014	1,071
Fine Gael	Michael Meade	9.5%	651	665	751	760	767	769		
Fianna Fáil	Sean Murray	8.7%	596	638	681	686	931	951	977	993
Fianna Fáil	Patrick Traynor*	8.0%	551	576	595	627				
Labour	Ken Lougheed	5.6%	382	397	402					
Fianna Fáil	Joe Halpin	5.1%	353	362						
Electorate: 13,953 Valid: 6,878 (49.29%) Spoilt: 77 Quota: 1,147 Turnout: 6,955 (49.85%)

=== Trim ===
Trim - 5 seats
Party	Candidate	FPv%	Count								
Party	Candidate	FPv%	1	2	3	4	5	6	7	8	9
Fianna Fáil	Noel Dempsey TD*	33.5%	2,113								
Fianna Fáil	Colm Hilliard TD*	20.2%	1,277								
Fine Gael	Willie Carey*	13.6%	858	913	930	933	935	977	1,037	1,066	
Fine Gael	Bernard Eivers	8.8%	555	636	658	661	668	712	719	729	791
Labour	Patrick Lowe	6.5%	409	491	514	521	539	607	631	640	891
Labour	Larry Murray	4.5%	282	371	384	388	400	442	457	467	
Fianna Fáil	Gabriel Cribbin*	4.4%	278	768	855	860	873	904	1,118		
Green	Patrick Cummins	3.9%	246	288	298	302	332				
Fianna Fáil	Sylvester Murphy	2.7%	173	360	403	406	413	433			
Sinn Féin	Lydia Comiskey	1.6%	101	123	129	130					
Independent	John Gormley	0.4%	23	35	38						
Electorate: 12,858 Valid: 6,315 (49.11%) Spoilt: 75 Quota: 1,053 Turnout: 6,390 (49.7%)
