= 2009 Meath County Council election =

Part of the 2009 Irish local elections

← 2004	5 June 2009	2014 →

29 seats on Meath County Council
	First party	Second party	Third party
Party	Fine Gael	Fianna Fáil	Labour
Seats won	11	8	4
Seat change	+2	-4	+4
	Fourth party	Fifth party	Sixth party
Party	Sinn Féin	Independent	Green
Seats won	1	5	0
Seat change	-1	-	-1
- Map showing the area of Meath County Council
Council control after election
TBD

An election to Meath County Council took place on 5 June 2009 as part of that year's Irish local elections. 29 councillors were elected from five local electoral areas (LEAs) for a five-year term of office on the electoral system of proportional representation by means of the single transferable vote (PR-STV).

== Results by party ==
Party	Seats	±	First Pref. votes	FPv%	±%
Fine Gael	11	+2	20,583	29.91	
Fianna Fáil	8	-4	20,337	29.55	
Labour	4	+4	8,061	11.72	
Sinn Féin	1	-1	5,456	7.93	
Independent	5	-	13,374	19.44	
Green	0	-1	1,001	1.45	
Totals	29	-	68,813	100.00	—

== Results by local electoral area ==
=== Dunshaughlin ===
Dunshaughlin - 7 seats
Party	Candidate	FPv%	Count													
Party	Candidate	FPv%	1	2	3	4	5	6	7	8	9	10	11	12	13	14
Independent	Brian Fitzgerald*	14.27	2,410													
Fianna Fáil	Nick Killian*	12.33	2,066	2,090	2,102	2,121										
Fine Gael	Regina Doherty	9.69	1,636	1,671	1,706	1,724	1,738	1,770	1,912	1,972	2,346					
Independent	Joe Bonner*	9.32	1,574	1,587	1,619	1,667	1,755	1,783	2,095	2,132						
Fianna Fáil	Noel Leonard*	6.33	1,070	1,106	1,121	1,137	1,140	1,167	1,189	1,541	1,563	1,575	1,580	1,583	1,639	1,666
Fine Gael	Maria Murphy	6.22	1,050	1,078	1,093	1,101	1,102	1,184	1,213	1,233	1,285	1,382	1,383	1,383	1,881	1,999
Fine Gael	Gerry O'Connor	6.22	1,050	1,070	1,092	1,107	1,108	1,142	1,173	1,286	1,336	1,371	1,374	1,377		
Labour	Niamh McGowan	5.61	947	961	980	1,021	1,244	1,580	1,684	1,733	1,949	2,018	2,025	2,026	2,350	
Fianna Fáil	Conor Tormey	5.55	938	943	947	959	982	983	1,031	1,150	1,365	1,386	1,390	1,392	1,424	1,438
Fianna Fáil	Oliver Brooks*	5.27	890	920	956	969	970	989	1,014							
Fine Gael	John Fanning	5.19	876	883	889	892	975	983	1,061	1,079						
Independent	Charles Bobbett*	4.42	746	772	810	850	871	887								
Labour	Michael McLoughlin	3.15	532	551	569	607	646									
Labour	John King	2.88	486	493	503	516										
Sinn Féin	Micheal O Gallachoir	1.90	321	328	352											
Independent	Patrick Long	0.93	157	175												
Green	Seán O Buachalla	0.84	142	150												
Electorate: 33,513 Valid: 16,891 (50.40%) Spoilt: 133 Quota: 2,112 Turnout: 17,024 (50.80%)

=== Kells ===
Kells - 5 seats
Party	Candidate	FPv%	Count				
Party	Candidate	FPv%	1	2	3	4	5
Fine Gael	Catherine Yore	12.87	1,751	1,805	2,086	2,357	
Fine Gael	Eugene Cassidy*	12.71	1,730	1,907	2,104	2,119	2,136
Fine Gael	John V. Farrelly*	12.41	1,688	1,761	2,027	2,209	2,246
Fianna Fáil	Oliver Fox	11.67	1,588	1,681	1,717	1,999	2,221
Fianna Fáil	Bryan Reilly*	11.36	1,545	1,965	2,128	2,598	
Sinn Féin	Michael Gallagher*	10.75	1,462	1,591	1,754	1,852	1,874
Fianna Fáil	Liz McCormack*	10.29	1,400	1,555	1,616		
Labour	Brian Collins	8.99	1,223	1,259			
Fianna Fáil	Dominic Moran	8.96	1,219				
Electorate: 23,078 Valid: 13,606 (58.96%) Spoilt: 222 Quota: 2,268 Turnout: 13,828 (59.92%)

=== Navan ===
Navan - 7 seats
Party	Candidate	FPv%	Count													
Party	Candidate	FPv%	1	2	3	4	5	6	7	8	9	10	11	12	13	14
Independent	Francis Deane	11.58	1,813	1,830	1,882	1,968										
Sinn Féin	Joe Reilly*	10.30	1,612	1,654	1,688	1,710	1,753	1,849	1,876	1,925	2,474					
Fine Gael	Jim Holloway*	8.63	1,351	1,361	1,393	1,402	1,428	1,455	1,488	1,866	1,920	1,952	1,954	2,064		
Fianna Fáil	Tommy Reilly*	7.82	1,225	1,249	1,257	1,359	1,388	1,428	1,543	1,562	1,590	1,611	1,611	1,629	1,630	1,711
Fine Gael	Suzanne Jamal	7.58	1,187	1,196	1,278	1,320	1,352	1,379	1,421	1,580	1,623	1,662	1,664	1,783	1,846	2,218
Fianna Fáil	Shane Cassells*	6.76	1,059	1,077	1,094	1,176	1,219	1,269	1,416	1,452	1,492	1,509	1,511	1,544	1,547	1,626
Labour	Jenny McHugh	5.25	822	833	858	862	885	925	957	998	1,051	1,125	1,125	1,653	1,671	1,775
Sinn Féin	Peadar Toibin	5.25	822	830	842	847	867	885	903	929						
Fine Gael	John Duffy	5.01	785	794	805	807	816	877	884							
Fine Gael	Patsy O'Neill*	4.94	773	779	791	798	894	909	944	982	1,002	1,024	1,025	1,051	1,058	
Labour	Eileen Drew	4.72	739	741	783	810	829	887	908	947	978	1,022	1,024			
Fianna Fáil	Paddy Fitzsimons	4.71	738	743	750	785	804	838	980	1,012	1,041	1,061	1,062	1,078	1,079	1,117
Fianna Fáil	Marguerite Fitzpatrick	3.61	565	572	585	636	673	693								
Independent	Adrian O'Donnell	3.27	512	520	527	532										
Fianna Fáil	Jimmy Mangan*	3.25	509	514	525											
Independent	Stephen Ball	3.21	503	547	561	565	634									
Green	Fergal O'Byrne	2.51	393	399												
Independent	Daithi Stephens	1.59	249													
Electorate: 27,418 Valid: 13,816 (50.39%) Spoilt: 310 Quota: 1,728 Turnout: 14,126 (51.52%)

=== Slane ===
Slane - 6 seats
Party	Candidate	FPv%	Count										
Party	Candidate	FPv%	1	2	3	4	5	6	7	8	9	10	11
Labour	Eoin Holmes*	16.24	2,088										
Fine Gael	Sirena Campbell	13.94	1,793	1,852									
Independent	Jimmy Cudden*	8.77	1,128	1,142	1,143	1,177	1,253	1,307	1,397	1,581	1,719	1,923	
Fianna Fáil	Wayne Harding	7.88	1,014	1,018	1,018	1,025	1,104	1,129	1,140	1,155	1,369	1,425	1,432
Independent	Seamus O'Neill	7.05	907	925	926	959	1,012	1,063	1,193	1,282	1,419	1,597	1,648
Fine Gael	Ann Dillon-Gallagher*	6.84	880	892	895	910	979	1,019	1,334	1,392	1,429	1,580	1,602
Fianna Fáil	Sinead Moore	6.55	842	855	855	902	949	981	1,032				
Fianna Fáil	Patrick Boshell*	6.39	822	832	833	870	879	982	996	1,063	1,311	1,416	1,421
Sinn Féin	Sinead Burke	5.91	760	785	786	857	885	924	965	1,067	1,128		
Independent	James Carey	5.71	734	748	749	793	807	839	864				
Fine Gael	Pat O'Brien	4.77	614	639	643	664	693	749					
Green	Tom Kelly*	3.62	466	493	493	540	564						
Independent	Hugh Gough	3.25	418	425	425	456							
Independent	Joanne Finnegan	3.06	394	416	418								
Electorate: 26,608 Valid: 12,860 (48.33%) Spoilt: 138 Quota: 1,838 Turnout: 12,998 (48.85%)

=== Trim ===
Trim - 4 seats
Party	Candidate	FPv%	Count				
Party	Candidate	FPv%	1	2	3	4	5
Fine Gael	Ray Butler	19.73	1,933	2,013			
Fianna Fáil	Jimmy Fegan*	16.51	1,618	1,656	1,738	2,472	
Fine Gael	Willie Carey*	15.16	1,486	1,535	1,635	1,799	1,915
Fianna Fáil	Seamus Murray*	12.54	1,229	1,260	1,288		
Labour	Tracy McElhinney	12.50	1,225	1,360	1,500	1,679	1,801
Independent	Trevor Golden	10.82	1,060	1,179	1,413	1,494	1,563
Independent	Phil Cantwell*	6.46	633	718			
Sinn Féin	Caroli Ni Loinsigh	4.89	479				
Independent	Eoghan Farrell	1.39	136				
Electorate: 20,557 Valid: 9,799 (47.67%) Spoilt: 120 Quota: 1,960 Turnout: 9,919 (48.25%)
