= 2014 Meath County Council election =

Part of the 2014 Irish local elections

- 23 May 2014

All 40 seats on Meath County Council 21 seats needed for a majority
	First party	Second party	Third party
Party	Fine Gael	Fianna Fáil	Sinn Féin
Seats won	13	10	8
Seat change	+2	+2	+7
	Fourth party	Fifth party
Party	Independent	Labour
Seats won	9	0
Seat change	+4	-4
- Map showing the area of Meath County Council
Council control before election
Fine Gael
Labour
Council control after election
Fine Gael
Independents

An election to all 40 seats on Meath County Council took place on 23 May 2014 as part of the 2014 Irish local elections, an increase from 29 seats at the 2009 election. County Meath was divided into six local electoral areas (LEAs) to elect councillors for a five-year term of office on the electoral system of proportional representation by means of the single transferable vote (PR-STV). In addition, the town councils of Kells, Navan and Trim were abolished.

Fine Gael remained the largest party, and gained 2 seats when compared to 2009, despite having a lower first preference vote than Fianna Fáil. The party was somewhat insulated by the additional seats allocated to Meath. While Fianna Fáil was the largest party in terms of vote share running too many candidates and transfer leakage, in LEAs like Kells, Ratoath and Trim in particular, saw the party miss out on potential additional seats. By contrast Sinn Féin were the major winners in the elections as the party returned a team of 8 to the new Council. Independents gained 4 additional seats, including Nick Killian, a former Fianna Fáil councillor. Labour lost all of their 4 Council seats in a testament to the anti-Government sentiment.

== Results by party ==
Party	Seats	±	1st pref	FPv%	±%
Fine Gael	13	+2	14,315	22.82	
Fianna Fáil	10	+2	17,366	27.68	
Sinn Féin	8	+7	11,402	18.17	
Labour	0	-4	3,225	5.14	
People Before Profit	0	0	333	0.53	
Direct Democracy	0	0	253	0.40	
Workers' Party	0	0	231	0.37	
Green	0	0	157	0.25	
Independent	9	+4	15,456	24.6	
Total	40	+11	62,738	100.00	—

== Results by local electoral area ==
*: Outgoing councillor.

=== Ashbourne ===
Ashbourne: 6 seats
Party	Candidate	FPv%	Count									
Party	Candidate	FPv%	1	2	3	4	5	6	7	8	9	10
Independent	Joe Bonner	21.41	1,907									
Sinn Féin	Darren O'Rourke	15.79	1,407									
Fianna Fáil	Dr. Claire O'Driscoll	14.35	1,278									
Fine Gael	Suzanne Jamal	8.28	738	765	771	774	775	778	790	855	1,057	1,183
Fine Gael	Alan Tobin	7.05	628	732	738	747	755	783	805	816	922	1,126
Fine Gael	David Harford	5.95	530	552	556	557	560	562	572	616		
Labour	Niamh McGowan	5.35	477	591	601	608	620	649	689	703	755	
Fianna Fáil	Joe Sheridan	5.34	476	495	506	511	512	515	525			
Independent	Sharon Keogan	5.07	452	497	524	530	538	577	759	820	910	990
Fianna Fáil	Seán Smith	5.06	451	555	563	576	584	599	629	840	881	1,001
Independent	Aisling O'Neill	2.80	249	322	349	367	398	498				
Independent	John King	1.55	138	206	219	229	288					
Independent	Paul Nolan	1.34	101	137	153	168						
Independent	Cathal Loftus	0.85	76	98	104							
Electorate: 19,845 (44.89%) Valid: 8,908 Spoilt: 93 Quota: 1,273 Turnout: 9,001 (45.36%)

=== Kells ===
Kells: 7 seats
Party	Candidate	FPv%	Count										
Party	Candidate	FPv%	1	2	3	4	5	6	7	8	9	10	11
Fianna Fáil	Seán Drew	12.03	1,634	1,638	1,650	1,658	1,727						
Sinn Féin	Michael Gallagher	11.77	1,599	1,607	1,649	1,653	1,686	1,687	1,843				
Sinn Féin	Johnny Guirke	11.50	1,562	1,572	1,607	1,619	1,633	1,633	1,643	1,656	2,068		
Independent	David Gilroy	11.18	1,519	1,551	1,597	1,683	1,706						
Fianna Fáil	Oliver Fox	8.52	1,158	1,161	1,163	1,173	1,178	1,179	1,237	1,246			
Fine Gael	Sarah Reilly	8.27	1,124	1,147	1,167	1,240	1,338	1,347	1,362	1,363	1,490	1,568	1,598
Fine Gael	Eugene Cassidy	8.10	1,100	1,104	1,115	1,188	1,210	1,212	1,301	1,347	1,378	1,394	1,399
Fine Gael	John V. Farrelly	8.06	1,095	1,099	1,102	1,158	1,207	1,211	1,245	1,261	1,334	1,373	1,377
Fianna Fáil	Bryan Reilly	7.42	1,008	1,010	1,019	1,021	1,079	1,090	1,313	1,327	1,698	1,785	
Fianna Fáil	Ronan Murtagh	4.95	673	674	680	681	686	686					
Labour	Brian Collins	2.91	395	420	435	448							
Fine Gael	Aideen Andrews	2.48	337	360	361								
Workers' Party	Seamus McDonagh	1.70	231	234									
Labour	Sandy Gallagher	1.10	150										
Electorate: 25,923 Valid: 13,585 (52.41%) Spoilt: 205 Quota: 1,699 Turnout: 13,790 (53.20%)

=== Laytown-Bettystown ===
Laytown-Bettystown: 7 seats
Party	Candidate	FPv%	Count							
Party	Candidate	FPv%	1	2	3	4	5	6	7	8
Sinn Féin	Eimear Ferguson	18.14	1,785							
Fianna Fáil	Wayne Harding	15.60	1,535							
Independent	Sharon Keogan	11.69	1,150	1,265						
Fine Gael	Sharon Tolan	8.51	837	860	868	874	891	1,068	1,090	1,270
Fine Gael	Paddy Meade	8.01	788	809	888	906	911	1,076	1,099	1,189
Fianna Fáil	Stephen McKee	7.98	785	811	871	875	880	925	1,015	1,086
Fianna Fáil	Patricia Heritage	6.36	626	675	760	775	796	813	841	916
Labour	Eoin Holmes	5.64	555	581	604	622	642	686	722	
Fine Gael	Dermot McCullen	5.16	508	521	529	536	545			
Independent	Tom Kelly	4.81	473	547	553	596	687	710	901	997
Independent	David Keaveney	3.44	339	433	448	497	592	609		
Direct Democracy	William Lacey	2.57	253	328	331	356				
Independent	Mick Martin	1.48	146	170	178					
Independent	Denis Proctor	0.62	61	75	84					
Electorate: 22,959 Valid: 9,841 (42.86%) Spoilt: 114 Quota: 1,231 Turnout: 9,955 (43.36%)

=== Navan ===
Navan: 7 seats
Party	Candidate	FPv%	Count									
Party	Candidate	FPv%	1	2	3	4	5	6	7	8	9	10
Sinn Féin	Joe Reilly	14.02	1,360									
Independent	Francis Deane	12.30	1,193	1,199	1,210	1,225						
Fianna Fáil	Shane Cassells	10.83	1,051	1,056	1,058	1,107	1,136	1,145	1,181	1,183	1,251	
Sinn Féin	Sinead Burke	10.14	984	1,070	1,077	1,122	1,166	1,256				
Fianna Fáil	Tommy Reilly	9.41	913	924	926	950	981	989	1,003	1,005	1,046	1,110
Independent	Wayne Forde	7.70	747	756	773	779	838	909	921	939	1,025	1,265
Fianna Fáil	Padraig Fitzsimons	6.77	657	661	662	685	701	717	732	734	759	810
Fine Gael	Jim Holloway	6.44	625	629	634	650	662	674	914	916	1,017	1,106
Independent	Paddy Pryle	4.62	448	454	470	482	506	573	589	604	667	
Labour	Anton McCabe	4.56	442	446	452	465	476	501	526	528		
Fine Gael	John Duffy	3.77	366	367	370	373	384	390				
People Before Profit	Alan Lawes	3.43	333	336	346	353	364					
Independent	Stephen Ball	2.75	267	271	275	278						
Fianna Fáil	Jenny McHugh	2.31	224	226	229							
Independent	Paul Hagan	0.61	59	60								
Independent	Gerry O'Brien	0.35	34	35								
Electorate: 22,088 Valid: 9,703 (43.93%) Spoilt: 122 Quota: 1,213 Turnout: 9,825 (44.48%)

=== Ratoath ===
Ratoath: 7 seats
Party	Candidate	FPv%	Count						
Party	Candidate	FPv%	1	2	3	4	5	6	7
Independent	Brian Fitzgerald	18.84	2,054						
Independent	Nick Killian	14.88	1,622						
Sinn Féin	Maria O'Kane	9.81	1,070	1,145	1,184	1,221	1,276	1,364	
Fine Gael	Maria Murphy	8.56	933	1,000	1,004	1,077	1,093	1,191	1,191
Fianna Fáil	Damien O'Reilly	8.50	927	1,016	1,024	1,040	1,144	1,375	
Fine Gael	Gerry O'Connor	7.90	861	937	944	989	1,002	1,018	1,018
Fine Gael	Gillian Toole	7.27	793	848	914	928	1,087	1,107	1,107
Independent	Seán Henry	5.77	629	770	809	874	901	982	982
Fianna Fáil	Noel Leonard	5.45	594	669	677	688	728		
Fianna Fáil	P.J. White	5.37	585	625	633	692	764	836	
Fianna Fáil	Deirdre Smith	4.31	470	491	552	578			
Labour	William Lacey	1.90	207	236	245				
Green	Seán O Buachalla	1.44	157	180	190				
Electorate: 24,916 Valid: 10,902 (43.76%) Spoilt: 110 Quota: 1,363 Turnout: 11,012 (44.20%)

=== Trim ===
Trim: 6 seats
Party	Candidate	FPv%	Count									
Party	Candidate	FPv%	1	2	3	4	5	6	7	8	9	10
Sinn Féin	Caroline Lynch	16.69	1,635									
Fine Gael	Joe Fox	12.43	1,218	1,227	1,234	1,239	1,264	1,271	1,367	1,421		
Independent	Trevor Golden	10.74	1,052	1,104	1,190	1,307	1,531					
Fine Gael	Enda Flynn	9.84	964	971	975	992	1,006	1,017	1,060	1,066	1,131	1,134
Fianna Fáil	Vera Flynn	9.46	927	942	946	956	969	982	1,009	1,082	1,125	1,127
Fianna Fáil	Ronan McKenna	9.0	882	897	905	911	918	923	961	1,182	1,336	1,345
Fine Gael	Noel French	8.88	870	878	896	901	915	924	959	1,006	1,313	1,320
Labour	James O'Shea	5.77	565	582	603	609	619	634	786	838		
Fianna Fáil	Vincent McHugh	5.23	512	523	529	531	536	545	558			
Labour	Tracey McElhinney	4.43	434	447	453	457	470	494				
Independent	Keith Ellis	2.96	290	316	346	419						
Independent	Dennis O'Rourke	2.30	225	265	282							
Independent	David Keane	2.30	225	247								
Electorate: 24,531 Valid: 9,799 (39.95%) Spoilt: 162 Quota: 1,400 Turnout: 9,961 (40.61%)

== Changes ==
=== Co-options ===
Party	Outgoing	LEA	Reason	Date	Co-optee
Fianna Fáil	Shane Cassells	Navan	Elected to the 32nd Dáil at the 2016 general election.	26 February 2016	Padraig Fitzsimons
Sinn Féin	Joe Reilly	Navan	Death.	4 September 2018	Edward Fennessy
Fianna Fáil	Seán Smith	Ashbourne	Moved to the US.	29 November 2018	Conor Tormey
