= 1985 Meath County Council election =

Part of the 1985 Irish local elections

← 1979	20 June 1985	1991 →

All 29 seats on Meath County Council
	First party	Second party	Third party
Party	Fianna Fáil	Fine Gael	Labour
Seats won	17	7	3
Seat change	+4	-2	-2
	Fourth party
Party	Independent
Seats won	2
Seat change	-
- Map showing the area of Meath County Council
Council control after election
Fianna Fail

An election to Meath County Council took place on 20 June 1985 as part of the Irish local elections. 29 councillors were elected from five local electoral areas (LEAs) for a five-year term of office on the electoral system of proportional representation by means of the single transferable vote (PR-STV). This term was extended for a further year, to 1991.

== Results by party ==
Party	Seats	±	First Pref. votes	FPv%	±%
Fianna Fáil	17	+4	20,674	50.62	
Fine Gael	7	-2	10,304	25.23	
Labour	3	-2	4,746	11.62	
Independent	2	-	3,994	9.78	
Totals	29	-	40,842	100.00	—

== Results by local electoral area ==
=== Dunshaughlin ===
Dunshaughlin: 5 seats
Party	Candidate	FPv%	Count										
Party	Candidate	FPv%	1	2	3	4	5	6	7	8	9	10	11
Fianna Fáil	Mary Wallace*		1,831										
Fianna Fáil	Sean Conway*		1,151	1,390									
Fine Gael	Mary Sylver*		706	741	744	745	749	768	784	804	816	940	1,290
Fianna Fáil	Tadhg Delaney		695	813	896	906	914	932	982	1,006	1,222	1,261	
Labour	Brian Fitzgerald		647	672	676	683	734	841	871	927	952	988	1,063
Fine Gael	John Fanning		592	603	607	608	612	632	642	726	731	762	943
Fine Gael	Seamus Lawless		504	523	525	531	562	580	609	620	634	742	
Fine Gael	Rosemary Swan		321	329	330	349	356	363	366	372	392		
Workers' Party	John King		243	244	245	250	250	258	299				
Sinn Féin	Tommy Johnson		224	232	235	241	249	258					
Fianna Fáil	Madeline Murphy		172	253	290	300	302	310	339	352			
Labour	Joe Mannering		161	190	194	194	236						
Labour	Sean Moran		153	100									
Independent	Edward McKeever		75	100									
Electorate: 13,001 Valid: 7,475 (57.97%) Spoilt: 68 Quota: 1,246 Turnout: 7,543

=== Kells ===
Kells: 7 seats
Party	Candidate	FPv%	Count												
Party	Candidate	FPv%	1	2	3	4	5	6	7	8	9	10	11	12	13
Fianna Fáil	Sen. Michael Lynch*		2,076												
Fianna Fáil	Johnny Brady*		1,204	1,454											
Fine Gael	John V. Farrelly TD*		1,196	1,215	1,215	1,223	1,232	1,241	1,313	1,323	1,460				
Fianna Fáil	Sebastian Rooney*		932	1,026	1,038	1,043	1,047	1,095	1,107	1,302	1,395				
Fianna Fáil	Fergus Muldoon*		874	911	930	933	942	950	951	1,000	1,021	1,025	1,036	1,057	1,066
Fine Gael	Tom Bradley*		833	845	848	853	859	862	953	965	1,041	1,080	1,087	1,547	
Independent	Patrick Andrews*		752	769	770	812	813	829	837	847	882	886	897	931	1,013
Fianna Fáil	Hugh McEnroe*		598	711	748	749	758	780	785	940	987	998	1,009	1,070	1,107
Fine Gael	Val Finnegan		571	656	661	664	731	737	773	781	833	858	863		
Labour	Tommy Grimes		489	498	498	531	588	641	662	706					
Fianna Fáil	John Caffrey		386	442	483	486	490	519	540						
Fine Gael	Christine Coburn		261	265	265	270	277	285							
Independent	John Maguire		206	216	216	217	218								
Labour	Patsy Clarke		170	202	206	208									
Labour	Joseph Conlon		106	112	112										
Electorate: 15,705 Valid: 10,654 (69.26%) Spoilt: 224 Quota: 1,332 Turnout: 10,878

=== Navan ===
Navan: 7 seats
Party	Candidate	FPv%	Count												
Party	Candidate	FPv%	1	2	3	4	5	6	7	8	9	10	11	12	13
Fianna Fáil	Paddy Fitzsimons*		1,567												
Fianna Fáil	Johnny Murtagh*		866	1,052	1,058	1,087									
Fianna Fáil	Peter Finnegan*		856	962	964	1,012	1,013	1,022	1,036	1,041	1,085				
Fine Gael	James Dorgan*		713	731	734	737	737	763	922	1,105					
Fianna Fáil	Jimmy Mangan		635	660	660	682	685	703	708	743	754	756	832	837	842
Fine Gael	Patsy O'Neill		634	642	662	673	674	689	711	847	870	894	996	1,023	1,023
Fianna Fáil	Owen Heaney		553	631	635	653	655	665	673	676	702	703	806	827	832
Independent	Patrick Andrews*		536	551	552	575	576	591	610	625	670	671			
Labour	Brendan Clusker*		533	554	570	597	599	753	784	801	962	964	1,128		
Workers' Party	Seamus McDonagh		354	362	367	420	421	439	451	460					
Fine Gael	Avril Molloy		335	340	341	345	345	370	439						
Fine Gael	Carmel Burke		328	334	335	342	342	358							
Sinn Féin	Jimmy Lynch		303	309	311										
Labour	Sean O'Brien		293	301	331	338	339								
Labour	Patsy Meehan		93	95											
Electorate: 16,420 Valid: 8,599 (53.11%) Spoilt: 122 Quota: 1,075 Turnout: 8,721

=== Slane ===
Slane: 5 seats
Party	Candidate	FPv%	Count									
Party	Candidate	FPv%	1	2	3	4	5	6	7	8	9	10
Independent	Gerald Marry		1,635									
Fianna Fáil	Patrick Traynor*		784	846	846	849	856	901	940	947	1,335	
Fianna Fáil	Robert Doonan*		737	787	788	867	875	884	1,203	1,267		
Fine Gael	Tom Kelly*		718	755	758	785	826	1,009	1,014	1,128	1,153	1,173
Independent	Jimmy Cudden*		558	654	666	703	732	801	814	841	1,010	1,083
Fianna Fáil	Sean Murray		543	623	630	636	672	679	727	734		
Fianna Fáil	Joe Halpin		482	493	495	498	501	503				
Fine Gael	Patrick Fullam*		455	497	499	514	578	603	622	892	933	948
Fine Gael	Moyna Doherty		395	411	415	442	477	507	545			
Labour	Ken Lougheed		376	387	428	434	445					
Fine Gael	Liam Smith		240	266	269	276						
Independent	Paddy Monaghan		202	223	225							
Labour	Owen Harty		74	82								
Electorate: 12,161 Valid: 7,229 (59.96%) Spoilt: 63 Quota: 1,205 Turnout: 7,292

=== Trim ===
Trim: 5 seats
Party	Candidate	FPv%	Count						
Party	Candidate	FPv%	1	2	3	4	5	6	7
Fianna Fáil	Colm Hilliard TD*		1,592						
Fianna Fáil	Noel Dempsey TD*		1,538						
Labour	Frank McLoughlin TD*		1,411						
Fine Gael	Willie Carey*		676	700	717	739	910	1,010	1,064
Fine Gael	Peter Higgins		417	442	479	507	645	728	747
Fine Gael	Tom O'Connor		409	426	436	449			
Fianna Fáil	Gabriel Cribbin		366	524	673	690	707	730	1,176
Labour	Patrick Lowe*		240	268	290	458	487		
Fianna Fáil	Patrick Cummins		236	428	583	598	631	693	
Electorate: 11,359 Valid: 6,885 (61.58%) Spoilt: 110 Quota: 1,148 Turnout: 6,995
