= 2004 Meath County Council election =

Part of the 2004 Irish local elections

- 11 June 2004

All 29 seats on Meath County Council
	First party	Second party	Third party
Party	Fianna Fáil	Fine Gael	Sinn Féin
Seats won	12	9	2
Seat change	-2	-2	+1
	Fourth party	Fifth party
Party	Green	Independent
Seats won	1	5
Seat change	+1	+2
- Map showing the area of Meath County Council
Council control after election
TBD

An election to Meath County Council took place on 11 June 2004 as part of that year's Irish local elections. 29 councillors were elected from five local electoral areas (LEAs) for a five-year term of office on the electoral system of proportional representation by means of the single transferable vote (PR-STV).

== Results by party ==
Party	Seats	±	First Pref. votes	FPv%	±%
Fianna Fáil	12	-2	24,011	38.36	
Fine Gael	9	-2	16,663	26.62	
Sinn Féin	2	+1	5,914	9.45	
Green	1	+1	2,690	4.30	
Independent	5	+2	8,539	13.64	
Totals	29	-	62,598	100.00	—

== Results by local electoral area ==
=== Dunshaughlin ===
Dunshaughlin - 6 seats
Party	Candidate	FPv%	Count											
Party	Candidate	FPv%	1	2	3	4	5	6	7	8	9	10	11	12
Fianna Fáil	Nick Killian*	14.74	2,195											
Independent	Brian Fitzgerald*	13.44	2,001	2,007	2,023	2,075	2,118	2,183						
Fianna Fáil	Oliver Brooks*	10.60	1,579	1,588	1,597	1,607	1,621	1,652	1,662	1,675	1,683	1,713	1,776	1,839
Fianna Fáil	Noel Leonard	9.84	1,465	1,472	1,480	1,487	1,491	1,515	1,518	1,530	1,754	1,770	2,075	2,136
Fianna Fáil	Conor Tormey*	7.92	1,180	1,190	1,192	1,210	1,230	1,267	1,268	1,318	1,330	1,574	1,610	1,640
Fine Gael	Charles Bobbett	7.68	1,143	1,154	1,171	1,239	1,272	1,309	1,313	1,419	1,452	1,844	2,552	
Fine Gael	John Fanning*	6.82	1,016	1,018	1,024	1,036	1,062	1,076	1,077	1,189	1,203			
Fine Gael	Ellen Cogavin	6.15	916	918	940	946	966	977	979	1,037	1,300	1,490		
Independent	Joe Bonner	6.10	909	911	913	942	980	1,043	1,054	1,205	1,364	1,551	1,632	1,766
Independent	Maria Murphy	4.51	671	672	687	719	741	789	804	871				
Labour	John King	3.02	449	450	584	599	683	756	759					
Sinn Féin	Keith Emmett	2.97	442	444	452	474	511							
Green	Antoin O Lochraigh	2.34	348	350	373	389								
Independent	Joseph Mannering	2.02	301	312	319									
Labour	Peter Ward	1.85	276	277										
Electorate: 27,800 Valid: 14,891 (53.56%) Spoilt: 265 Quota: 2,128 Turnout: 15,156 (54.52%)

=== Kells ===
Kells - 6 seats
Party	Candidate	FPv%	Count			
Party	Candidate	FPv%	1	2	3	4
Sinn Féin	Michael Gallagher	12.45	1,619	1,681	1,766	1,966
Fine Gael	Eugene Cassidy	12.13	1,577	1,601	1,761	1,837
Fianna Fáil	Bryan Reilly*	11.56	1,503	1,539	1,764	1,950
Fine Gael	John V. Farrelly TD*	11.35	1,475	1,516	1,613	1,887
Fianna Fáil	Liz McCormack*	10.89	1,416	1,475	1,652	1,713
Fianna Fáil	Michael Lynch*	10.82	1,407	1,426	1,713	1,828
Fine Gael	Gerry Gibney*	10.21	1,328	1,358	1,372	1,463
Fianna Fáil	Dominic Moran	8.71	1,133	1,143		
Labour	Tommy Grimes	8.38	1,089	1,187	1,215	
Green	Deirdre Reynolds	3.49	454			
Electorate: 21,503 Valid: 13,001 (60.46%) Spoilt: 340 Quota: 1,858 Turnout: 13,341 (62.04%)

=== Navan ===
Navan - 7 seats
Party	Candidate	FPv%	Count											
Party	Candidate	FPv%	1	2	3	4	5	6	7	8	9	10	11	12
Fianna Fáil	Tommy Reilly*	12.90	1,782											
Sinn Féin	Joe Reilly*	11.47	1,585	1,655	1,661	1,755								
Fine Gael	Jim Holloway*	10.81	1,494	1,536	1,540	1,609	1,611	1,637	1,751					
Fianna Fáil	Alison Boyle	9.18	1,268	1,299	1,314	1,341	1,343	1,450	1,521	1,524	1,593	1,625	1,736	
Fine Gael	Jenny D'Arcy	7.18	992	1,018	1,020	1,089	1,091	1,121	1,188	1,192	1,260	1,582	1,800	
Fianna Fáil	Shane Cassells	6.77	935	968	978	1,008	1,010	1,118	1,187	1,191	1,249	1,278	1,340	1,358
Fianna Fáil	Jimmy Mangan*	6.04	834	841	847	856	856	905	915	915	938	1,096	1,193	1,199
Fine Gael	Patsy O'Neill*	5.58	771	780	781	802	802	972	984	986	1,015	1,134	1,224	1,272
Fine Gael	Caroline Hogan	5.28	730	743	744	768	769	775	787	791	817			
Fianna Fáil	Brendan Markey	4.65	642	652	655	667	668							
Sinn Féin	Peadar Toibin	4.53	626	632	633	674	687	717	773	775				
Green	Fergal O'Byrne	4.52	624	643	643	743	745	760	818	822	956	1,003		
Labour	Anton McCabe	4.15	574	616	618									
Independent	Andy Brennan	3.95	546	623	625	680	682	701						
Independent	Christy Gorman	2.99	413											
Electorate: 27,418 Valid: 13,816 (50.39%) Spoilt: 310 Quota: 1,728 Turnout: 14,126 (51.52%)

=== Slane ===
Slane - 5 seats
Party	Candidate	FPv%	Count									
Party	Candidate	FPv%	1	2	3	4	5	6	7	8	9	10
Independent	Jimmy Cudden*	14.73	1,145	1,166	1,312	1,358	1,448	1,498	1,536	1,720	1,934	
Fianna Fáil	Hugh Gough*	8.37	911	925	947	975	991	1,258	1,270	1,338	1,406	1,432
Independent	Dominic Hannigan	8.35	908	929	1,005	1,081	1,173	1,193	1,326	1,417	1,512	1,536
Fianna Fáil	Patrick Boshell	8.20	892	898	915	946	1,062	1,208	1,354	1,450	1,528	1,556
Fine Gael	Ann Dillon-Gallagher*	8.00	870	899	913	978	1,031	1,214	1,350	1,409	1,891	
Fine Gael	Shaun Lynch*	7.92	862	875	937	967	1,013	1,052	1,251	1,304		
Fianna Fáil	Gerard Reid	7.70	838	845	866	870	899					
Sinn Féin	Seamus Lynch	7.34	799	815	868	922	959	1,005	1,034			
Fine Gael	Martina Maguire	7.18	781	797	816	886	985	995				
Progressive Democrats	Sirena Campbell	6.46	703	722	736	827						
Labour	Shane Cassidy	6.13	667	685	711							
Green	Tom Kelly*	5.40	587	741	778	907	1,050	1,078	1,236	1,389	1,527	1,558
Independent	Pat O'Brien	5.09	554	566								
Green	Carol Davis	3.34	363									
Electorate: 22,580 Valid: 10,880 (48.18%) Spoilt: 297 Quota: 1,814 Turnout: 11,177 (49.50%)

=== Trim ===
Trim - 5 seats
Party	Candidate	FPv%	Count					
Party	Candidate	FPv%	1	2	3	4	5	6
Fianna Fáil	Jimmy Fegan*	17.92	1,794					
Fine Gael	Peter Higgins*	15.05	1,507	1,549	1,578	1,682		
Fianna Fáil	Seamus Murray*	12.08	1,209	1,223	1,246	1,340	1,935	
Fine Gael	Willie Carey*	12.00	1,201	1,219	1,222	1,264	1,411	1,482
Independent	Phil Cantwell	10.90	1,091	1,142	1,160	1,382	1,475	1,549
Fianna Fáil	Gabriel Cribbin*	10.27	1,028	1,043	1,079	1,149		
Labour	Pat Holton	10.22	1,023	1,100	1,106	1,278	1,395	1,464
Sinn Féin	Caroli Ni Loinsigh	8.42	843	890	900			
Green	Carole Doherty	3.14	314					
Electorate: 21,185 Valid: 10,010 (47.25%) Spoilt: 281 Quota: 1,669 Turnout: 10,291 (48.58%)
