= Oluwayemi =

Oluwayemi is a surname. Notable people with the surname include:

- Josh Oluwayemi (born 2001), English footballer
- Tobi Oluwayemi (born 2003), English footballer

== See also ==
- Oluwayemisi Oluremi Obilade (born 1958), Nigerian academic
- Oluwayemi Yemi Adenuga, Nigerian-Irish politician
