= Shane McEntee =

Shane McEntee may refer to:

- Shane McEntee (Gaelic footballer), Irish Gaelic footballer who plays for Meath
- Shane McEntee (politician) (1956–2012), Irish Fine Gael politician and uncle of the Gaelic footballer
