= 2024 Meath County Council election =

Part of the 2024 Irish local elections

- 7 June 2024

All 40 seats on Meath County Council 21 seats needed for a majority
	First party	Second party	Third party
Party	Fine Gael	Fianna Fáil	Sinn Féin
Last election	12	12	3
Seats won	11	9	6
Seat change	▼1	▼3	▲3
	Fourth party	Fifth party	Sixth party
Party	Aontú	Social Democrats	Labour
Last election	1	1	1
Seats won	2	1	0
Seat change	▲1	Steady	▼1
	Seventh party
Party	Independent
Last election	10
Seats won	11
Seat change	▲1
- Results by Local Electoral Area

An election to all 40 seats on Meath County Council was held on 7 June 2024 as part of the 2024 Irish local elections. County Meath is divided into 6 local electoral areas (LEAs) to elect councillors for a five-year term of office on the electoral system of proportional representation by means of the single transferable vote (PR-STV).

== Retiring incumbents ==
The following councillors were not seeking re-election:

Constituency	Departing Councillor	Party
Ratoath	Deirdre Geraghty-Smith	Fianna Fáil

== Results by party ==
Party	Candidates	Seats	±	First Pref. votes	FPv%	±%
Fine Gael	17	11	▼1	18,559	24.36	▼5.22
Fianna Fáil	17	9	▼3	15,887	20.86	▼4.42
Sinn Féin	14	6	▲3	10,170	13.35	▲3.50
Aontú	7	2	▲1	4,883	6.41	▲1.57
Social Democrats	2	1	Steady	1,251	1.64	▼0.57
Labour	3	0	▼1	1,389	1.82	▼0.64
Green	4	0	Steady	1,154	1.51	▲0.63
National Party	2	0	New	556	0.73	New
Independent Ireland	2	0	New	464	0.61	New
Irish Freedom	1	0	New	297	0.39	New
Workers' Party	1	0	Steady	178	0.23	▼0.25
Party for Animal Welfare	1	0	New	80	0.11	New
Independent	21	11	▲1	21,304	27.97	▲4.14
Totals	92	40	Steady	76,172	100.00	

== Results by LEA ==
*: Outgoing councillor elected in 2019.
†: Outgoing councillor coopted subsequent to the 2019 election.

=== Ashbourne ===
Ashbourne: 6 seats
Party	Candidate	FPv%	Count										
Party	Candidate	FPv%	1	2	3	4	5	6	7	8	9	10	11
Independent	Joe Bonner	24.66%	2,685										
Independent	Amanda Smith	13.91%	1,514	1,546									
Fine Gael	Suzanne Jamal	11.43%	1,244	1,299	1,303	1,334	1,335	1,357	1,390	1,394	1,432	1,610	
Fine Gael	Alan Tobin	10.28%	1,119	1,391	1,409	1,428	1,479	1,483	1,529	1,531	1,544		
Fianna Fáil	Conor Tormey	7.10%	773	949	955	957	975	979	1,017	1,019	1,036	1,243	1,395
Fianna Fáil	Bryan Mallon	5.21%	567	584	587	603	607	613	629	629	652		
Aontú	Brandon Scott	5.18%	564	621	638	649	658	757	811	813	862	933	1,040
Sinn Féin	Helen Meyer	4.96%	539	635	643	647	654	664	685	686	972	1,001	1,242
Social Democrats	Paul Nolan	4.16%	453	594	603	646	690	710	753	755	779	808	
Sinn Féin	Maria Uí Ruairc	3.99%	434	458	464	470	476	486	502	503			
National Party	Jean Murray	2.27%	247	285	290	295	298						
Independent	Sivakumar Murugadoss	1.58%	172	218	230	247							
Green	Martina Eskdale	1.51%	164	180	181								
Independent	Charles Bobbett	1.41%	154	270	322	324	350	411					
Independent	Cathal Ashbourne-Loftus	0.67%	73	127									
Independent	Marcin Czekalski	0.17%	19	32									
Electorate: 23,012 Valid: 10,721 Spoilt: 166 Quota: 1,532 Turnout: 10,887 (47.31%)

=== Kells ===
Kells: 7 seats
Party	Candidate	FPv%	Count									
Party	Candidate	FPv%	1	2	3	4	5	6	7	8	9	10
Fine Gael	Sarah Reilly	13.88%	2,077									
Fine Gael	Eugene Cassidy	12.25%	1,833	1,874								
Fianna Fáil	Seán Drew	9.86%	1,476	1,506	1,513	1,594	1,639	1,639	1,704	1,939		
Fianna Fáil	Mike Bray	8.88%	1,328	1,347	1,355	1,388	1,480	1,480	1,528	1,730	1,775	2,086
Sinn Féin	Michael Gallagher	8.41%	1,258	1,264	1,279	1,304	1,310	1,311	1,439	1,544	1,550	1,591
Independent	David Gilroy	8.23%	1,231	1,239	1,309	1,427	1,442	1,442	1,688	1,735	1,738	1,876
Sinn Féin	Peter Caffrey	6.60%	987	991	995	1,013	1,269	1,269	1,320	1,332	1,335	1,524
Sinn Féin	Oliver Curran	6.38%	955	960	968	1,047	1,053	1,053	1,119	1,172	1,178	1,234
Fine Gael	Seamus McGee	5.33%	798	845	848	878	1,024	1,026	1,057	1,139	1,144	
Fianna Fáil	Paul McCabe	5.33%	797	814	814	872	899	899	941			
Fianna Fáil	Paddy Rennick	4.76%	712	721	722	728						
Aontú	Peter Devlin	4.74%	709	717	784	872	897	897				
Independent	Cormac Corr	3.66%	547	558	588							
Independent Ireland	Colm Mac an tSionnaigh	1.72%	257	258								
Electorate: 27,565 Valid: 14,963 Spoilt: 208 Quota: 1,871 Turnout: 15,171 (55.04%)

=== Laytown–Bettystown ===
Laytown–Bettystown: 7 seats
Party	Candidate	FPv%	Count										
Party	Candidate	FPv%	1	2	3	4	5	6	7	8	9	10	11
Fine Gael	Sharon Tolan	13.25%	1,782										
Independent	Geraldine Keoghan	11.44%	1,538	1,540	1,557	1,595	1,612	1,666	1,824				
Fianna Fáil	Stephen McKee	11.15%	1,499	1,515	1,521	1,528	1,561	1,625	1,651	1,657	1,824		
Fine Gael	Paddy Meade	10.91%	1,467	1,479	1,483	1,486	1,513	1,681					
Fianna Fáil	Wayne Harding	9.51%	1,278	1,279	1,282	1,284	1,299	1,342	1,468	1,482	1,669	1,726	
Sinn Féin	Maria White	7.88%	1,059	1,069	1,082	1,097	1,132	1,137	1,202	1,207	1,264	1,280	1,921
Independent	Carol Lennon	6.95%	934	944	990	1,035	1,053	1,055	1,136	1,196	1,302	1,319	1,358
Sinn Féin	Seamus Lynch	5.53%	744	745	754	756	766	788	854	863	886	891	
Labour	Elaine McGinty	5.42%	729	737	746	750	882	894	919	923	994	1,013	1,063
Fianna Fáil	Tom Behan	4.76%	640	661	665	680	714	730	746	749			
Aontú	Peter Whelan	4.65%	625	626	634	684	687	705					
Fine Gael	Declan O'Neill	3.20%	430	440	440	446	464						
Green	Cathal Mac Reamoinn	2.66%	357	364	370	378							
Independent Ireland	Raymond Westlake	1.54%	207	208	226								
Independent	Patrick Smith	0.78%	105	105									
Independent	Marjeta Qevani	0.38%	51	52									
Electorate: 28,991 Valid: 13,445 Spoilt: 160 Quota: 1,681 Turnout: 13,605 (46.93%)

=== Navan ===
Navan: 7 seats
Party	Candidate	FPv%	Count												
Party	Candidate	FPv%	1	2	3	4	5	6	7	8	9	10	11	12	13
Sinn Féin	Eddie Fennessy	14.30%	1,711												
Aontú	Emer Tóibín	13.28%	1,588												
Independent	Francis Deane	9.73%	1,164	1,176	1,182	1,198	1,222	1,244	1,261	1,335	1,371	1,419	1,452	1,520	
Fianna Fáil	Padraig Fitzsimons	7.69%	920	939	942	945	949	999	1,006	1,011	1,038	1,049	1,069	1,192	1,239
Fine Gael	Linda Nelson Murray	7.27%	870	880	886	893	899	931	937	943	983	1,000	1,145	1,237	1,293
Independent	Alan Lawes	6.47%	774	794	800	827	838	842	859	954	998	1,039	1,080	1,134	1,317
Fianna Fáil	Tommy Reilly	6.64%	794	804	809	811	820	840	849	854	870	880	905	969	1,025
Fine Gael	Yemi Adenuga	6.31%	755	759	762	767	773	787	791	791	861	904	1,011	1,211	1,272
Fianna Fáil	Kashif Ali	5.80%	694	697	699	699	700	739	743	745	774	812	874		
Sinn Féin	Caoimhe Ní Shluain	4.28%	512	588	591	591	600	610	793	809	849	867	881	913	
Fine Gael	Ross Kelly	3.69%	441	444	446	447	449	461	463	467	498	522			
Green	Seamus McMenamin	2.92%	349	354	355	356	366	374	380	384					
Aontú	Jose Cyriac	2.78%	333	335	342	344	426	431	436	468	482				
Irish Freedom	David O'Shea	2.48%	297	299	301	348	369	370	375						
Sinn Féin	Frances Murphy	2.01%	240	280	283	285	294	296							
Fianna Fáil	Niamh Carroll	1.88%	225	226	228	229	236								
Aontú	Francis O'Toole	1.41%	169	175	215	223									
Independent	Edel Gillick	1.05%	126	128	129										
Electorate: 25,710 Valid: 11,962 Spoilt: 227 Quota: 1,496 Turnout: 12,189 (47.41%)

=== Ratoath ===
Ratoath: 7 seats
Party	Candidate	FPv%	Count												
Party	Candidate	FPv%	1	2	3	4	5	6	7	8	9	10	11	12	13
Independent	Gillian Toole†	23.82%	3,158												
Fine Gael	Maria Murphy	13.53%	1,794												
Independent	Brian Fitzgerald	11.23%	1,488	1,581	1,593	1,604	1,626	1,642	1,651	1,674					
Fianna Fáil	Caroline O'Reilly	10.81%	1,433	1,500	1,564	1,573	1,599	1,609	1,614	1,668					
Independent	Nick Killian	7.73%	1,025	1,468	1,471	1,480	1,497	1,539	1,557	1,582	1,723				
Fianna Fáil	John Donohoe	6.59%	874	964	966	970	974	976	977	1,000	1,007	1,056	1,061	1,064	
Fine Gael	Gerry O'Connor	5.69%	754	936	961	965	966	978	979	1,006	1,017	1,210	1,219	1,222	1,603
Sinn Féin	Fionnan Blake	5.23%	693	769	772	779	793	817	1,006	1,039	1,061	1,085	1,094	1,094	1,215
Labour	Eilish Balfe	3.64%	483	675	679	686	689	737	755	873	895	1,067	1,081	1,092	1,200
Fine Gael	Fergus O'Riordan	2.89%	383	546	555	558	560	571	578	590	611				
National Party	Jean Murray	2.33%	309	358	358	369	378	391	395	398					
Green	Ruadháin Bonham	2.14%	284	316	324	331	337	355	360						
Sinn Féin	Trish Murtagh	1.60%	212	238	239	243	248	267							
Workers' Party	Gerry Rooney	1.34%	178	228	229	233	239								
Independent	Eleanor Carroll	0.81%	107	120	123	130									
Party for Animal Welfare	Carolyn Fahy	0.60%	80	105	107										
Electorate: 28,420 Valid: 13,255 Spoilt: 98 Quota: 1,657 Turnout: 13,353 (46.98%)

=== Trim ===
Trim: 6 seats
Party	Candidate	FPv%	Count							
Party	Candidate	FPv%	1	2	3	4	5	6	7	8
Independent	Noel French	33.52%	3,963							
Fine Gael	Joe Fox	15.91%	1,881							
Fianna Fáil	Aisling Dempsey††	8.33%	1,044	1,365	1,412	1,447	1,461	1,578	1,621	1,810
Aontú	Dave Boyne	7.57%	895	1,159	1,179	1,192	1,217	1,251	1,442	1,502
Fianna Fáil	Pádraig Coffey	7.04%	833	1,036	1,055	1,083	1,105	1,115	1,151	1,439
Social Democrats	Ronan Moore	6.75%	798	1,184	1,217	1,229	1,254	1,354	1,557	1,677
Fine Gael	Niamh Souhan	4.37%	517	688	723	768	774	1,001	1,035	
Independent	Trevor Golden	4.03%	476	952	982	992	1,005	1,069	1,187	1,282
Sinn Féin	Dáithí McEvoy	3.60%	426	538	555	559	889	917		
Fine Gael	Luba Healy	3.50%	414	568	581	622	637			
Sinn Féin	Aoife Drew	3.38%	400	490	498	501				
Labour	Tracey McElhinney	1.50%	177	273						
Electorate: 27,282 Valid: 11,824 Spoilt: 162 Quota: 1,690 Turnout: 11,986 (43.93%)

=== Changes since 2024 ===
- †
- ††
