= James McEntee (Gaelic footballer) =

Gaelic footballer

James McEntee is a Gaelic footballer who plays at the back for the Meath county team. His cousin Shane plays ahead of him in midfield for Meath.

James McEntee's uncle Andy is manager of Meath.

He is also related to former Meath footballer, Gerry. He is also related to Shane, a Fine Gael politician who was a Teachta Dála (TD) from 2005 until his death in 2012. His daughter Helen succeeded him.
