= Sharon Keogan =

Irish politician (born 1967)

Senator Sharon Keogan
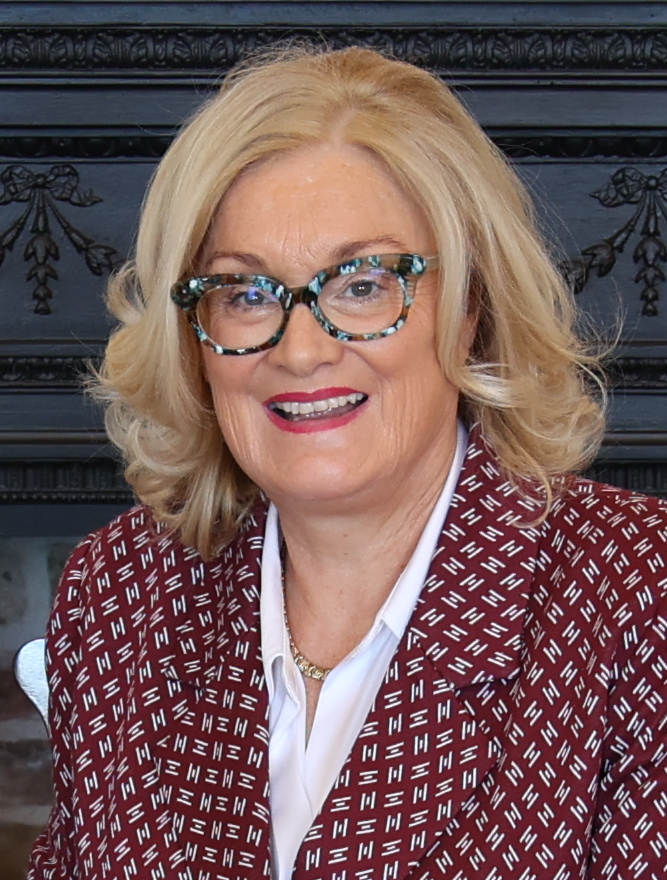
- Keogan in 2025

Senator
- Incumbent
- Assumed office 29 June 2020
- Constituency: Industrial and Commercial Panel

Personal details
- Born: March 1967 (age 59) County Meath, Ireland
- Party: Independent
- Other political affiliations: Fianna Fáil (until 2011)

Sharon Keogan (born March 1967) is an Irish independent right-wing politician who has served as a senator for the Industrial and Commercial Panel since June 2020. Originally involved in the pub and restaurant business, Keogan was first elected as a local councillor in the 2014 Meath County Council election, and held that role until her nomination and election to the Seanad in 2020.

== Political career ==
Keogan started out her political career in the Fianna Fáil party. She became a member of its national executive but, having failed to secure a nomination to run for Fianna Fáil in the 2011 general election, she left the party. She subsequently joined an alliance of independent candidates, known as New Vision, which was formed to contest that election. Keogan, who was not elected in the 2011 election, also unsuccessfully contested the general elections in 2016 and 2020 in the Meath East constituency.

=== Meath County Council ===
Sharon Keogan was a member of Meath County Council from 2014 to 2020.

At the 2009 Meath County Council election, Keogan's then business and life partner Seamus O'Neill was elected as an independent to the local electoral area (LEA) of Slane. He resigned in 2012 citing pressure of work as a publican and undertaker. Keogan was expected to succeed him as being the replacement O'Neill had nominated after his election, but she was found to be ineligible for co-option as an independent in 2012 because she had been a member of Fianna Fáil in 2009. Instead her son Arian Keogan was co-opted.

Arian Keogan did not stand in the 2014 Meath County Council election, and his mother Sharon was elected to the redrawn LEA of Laytown–Bettystown. At the 2019 Meath County Council election, she retained her seat in the Laytown-Bettystown LEA and also won an additional seat in the Ashbourne LEA. While this made Keogan the first woman in Ireland elected to two electoral areas, one of the seats had to be vacated as no councillor may hold two seats simultaneously. After the election, she attempted to claim a state grant for both seats, describing it as "unfair" and "unjust" when the application for the second payment (which is intended to encourage more women to run for office) was denied. Keogan chose to sit for Laytown-Bettystown LEA and nominated Amanda Smith to be co-opted into the Ashbourne seat.

Keogan made national headlines in January 2020, after she posted on her Facebook account asking whether disabled children should be microchipped following the death of Nóra Quoirin in Malaysia. In the same month, after she made public statements about the killing of a taxi driver in the area, Keogan's office was the subject of a suspected arson attack. Keogan speculated that her anti-drug views had also made her a target of local criminals.

Following Keogan's election to the Seanad, her sister Geraldine Keogan was co-opted to fill her seat on Meath County Council.

=== Senator ===
Keogan was elected, by the local councillors and Oireachtas members on the Industrial and Commercial Panel, in the 2020 Seanad election. She was returned in the 2025 Seanad election.

==== "LGBT takeover of society" claim ====
In September 2021, in response to the Katherine Zappone controversy, Keogan was criticised after she stated that there was "an organised takeover at every level in our society" by the LGBT community. Keogan went on to indicate that she believed that "governments around the world" were trying to "catapult" LGBT people into high-level jobs. Former Leas-Chathaoirleach of Seanad Éireann Jerry Buttimer responded that "She is entitled to her own opinions but she can also be asked to explain herself and to be challenged" and criticised her statement as suggesting there was some kind of conspiracy and for echoing far-right sentiments. The Meath branches of the Social Democrats and People Before Profit also issued statements condemning Keogan's assertions, with the Meath-based president of Ógra Fianna Fáil, Bryan Mallon, stating that Keogan had looked at the controversy surrounding Zappone's proposed appointment and had "added 2 + 2 together and got 5, ridiculously using it as an opportunity to dismiss the issues that members of the LGBTQIA+ community suffer daily, not least fair representation in government". In a statement given to The Times, Keogan stated she had "an established record in supporting and participating in LGBT education programmes within my community" but was "opposed to governments, whether the Biden administration or the Irish government, appointing personnel based on their sexual orientation".

==== Surrogacy debate ====
In April 2022, Keogan was criticised by fellow senators such as Lynn Ruane after Keogan expressed the view that surrogacy was "harmful, exploitative and unethical", that she "wholeheartedly objects to the commercialisation of the human child", and told a witness representing the organisation Irish Gay Dads during an Oireachtas Committee exploring surrogacy laws that he was "extremely lucky to be here today". Following more questions by Keogan to witnesses that were ruled to be out of order, interim chairperson Kathleen Funchion told Keogan that she was being disrespectful and Keogan was asked to leave on the grounds of disorderly conduct. Keogan subsequently objected to comments by Ruane that Keogan was being "crude and cold" and that she was expressing "personal bigotry" on the topic. In a later statement, Keogan wrote that she wished to "object to this deeply personal attack on me during a public meeting and contend that the language used by the member was inflammatory, discriminatory and sought to characterise me and my contribution unfairly" and commented that the committee was acting like an "echo chamber". She resigned from the Joint Oireachtas Committee on Children, Equality, Disability, Integration and Youth in April 2022, stating that she no longer felt "safe or protected as a member of the committee".

==== Accusing O'Gorman of exclusively funding LGBT causes ====
Between 2021 and 2022, the Irish government discovered that €1,100,000 it had allocated to be spent through various schemes was never used. That money was then pooled together and reallocated to a number of LGBT groups by the Department of Children, Equality, Disability, Integration and Youth. In the Seanad in April 2023, Keogan asked Minister Roderic O'Gorman "Why were only LGBT organisations in receipt of the funding? Were there no other initiatives that would have benefited from this?" before stating that unnamed parties were accusing O'Gorman of engaging "in a sort of ideology-based parochialism, prioritising pet projects which fall under your Government's remit over others".

A reportedly furious O'Gorman defended the action as a “standard and commonplace feature of department financial procedure" and noted 26 similar transfers had also occurred in a similar time period, but this was the only one that he, a gay man, was being asked about. O'Gorman accused Keogan of "peddling lies" and "in doing so, although always implied, always unspoken, the charge rests that I as a gay politician must be up to no good in an effort to benefit my own community. That I would go as far as to take funding away from other vulnerable groups to do so". O'Gorman reiterated his defence of the spending, denied any bias, and suggested that Keogan was acting entirely in bad faith and that she knew the spending was entirely routine.

==== Allegations of xenophobia ====
In April 2023, Keogan posted a tweet which contained an image of Kevin Bakhurst, Gabriel Makhlouf, Sebastian Barnes of the Irish Fiscal Advisory Council, Drew Harris and Jeremy Godfrey, chairperson of the Irish Media Commission, with the accompanying text "5 key appointments governing us all made in the last 5 years. No jobs for the Irish here. Do they not trust us? What's wrong with the Irish?" No Irish need apply".

The tweet was widely condemned as xenophobic across the Irish political spectrum; the next day numerous members of the Seanad (Michael McDowell, Victor Boyhan, Gerard Craughwell, David Norris, Timmy Dooley, Fiona O'Loughlin and Tom Clonan) all formally denounced Keogan and her tweet. Timmy Dooley stated "I'm absolutely really annoyed by what Senator Keogan posted. It's disgusting. I know three of the individuals and they are three of the finest people that you could find anywhere. And I'd ask Senator Keogan to reflect on this: I saw her in the other house last week running to get a ringside seat to be part of the Joe Biden situation. If she feels so strongly about migration and immigration she shouldn't have been in there. We were celebrating the fact that an Irishman had made it to the highest office in the United States. And yet, we see this kind of vile language being used against some of our nearest neighbours".

It was also noted by several media outlets that the tweet was incorrect, highlighting that, while Drew Harris is originally from Belfast, he is an Irish citizen. In the immediate aftermath of the tweet, Keogan did not attend the Seanad and refused to speak with the media.

==== Leinster House event featuring far-right and anti-vaccine speakers ====
In February 2024, members of the Dáil expressed concerns over an event that was organised by Keogan and held in Leinster House. The event, titled "WHO pandemic treaty, know the facts", featured far-right and anti-vaccination advocates. Critics, including TDs Neasa Hourigan, Louise O'Reilly, and Paul Murphy argued that the panel promoted disinformation and extremist views. The event's panelists included Christine Anderson, an MEP from the Alternative for Germany party; English MP Andrew Bridgen, who was expelled from the Conservative Party in 2023 for promoting vaccine misinformation; Meryl Nass, a Maine doctor and anti-vaccine activist with a suspended license; and Tess Lawrie of the World Council for Health, an organisation which has been criticised for spreading vaccine misinformation.

==== Spreading false and misleading information ====
In 2023 and throughout 2024, TheJournal.ie debunked several online posts by Keogan. These included false claims of children being human trafficked to County Mayo, the misleading attribution of statistics to assert that Dublin had the "worst homelessness" of any major city in the western world (alongside the #IrelandIsFull hashtag) and the incorrect assertion that Bangladeshi asylum seekers in County Westmeath were provided with a "free home".

In March 2024, the Electoral Commission issued a statement after Keogan erected misleading campaign posters during the 2024 Irish constitutional referendums. Keogan's posters stated that "Don't force mothers out to work… Vote No". The statement read "An Coimisiún Toghcháin (The Electoral Commission) is clear that one of the posters which have been posted in a number of areas in Dublin and elsewhere under the imprint of Senator Sharon Keogan is an incorrect representation of what people are being asked to vote on this Friday", and that Keogan's posters "misrepresents what the current provision and its proposed amendment actually mean". Keogan stood by her posters and complained about the commission's intervention.

==== Gareth Sheridan presidential campaign ====
In 2025, Keogan helped Gareth Sheridan seek support from county councils for a nomination for the presidential election. He ultimately secured support from two councils, with four councils required for a nomination.

== Political views ==
Since joining the Seanad, Keogan, alongside Peter Fitzpatrick, Mattie McGrath, Carol Nolan and Rónán Mullen have formed the Oireachtas Life and Dignity Group; a unit which advocates for anti-abortion and anti-euthanasia views. In 2021 the group tried to build support for a proposed "Foetal Pain Relief Bill", but the bill was ultimately voted down in December of that same year.

In April 2022, Keogan congratulated right-wing Hungarian leader Victor Orban upon his party's victory in the 2022 Hungarian parliamentary election, stating on Twitter: "#VictorOrban winner alright. When 6 different parties try to squash nationalism, this is what happens. Orban doesn't bend the knee to anyone. #Hungary first, his #people first and #family first". Keogan was subsequently criticised for that view, amongst others, in an article by Una Mullally for The Irish Times.

Described by some sources as "right-leaning in her politics", Keogan has reportedly described herself as "Pro-Trump". She endorsed Donald Trump during the 2024 United States presidential election and subsequently stated that she celebrated his victory on the floor of the Irish senate. In March 2025, she sent a letter to American politicians asking for an invite to the White House for St. Patrick's Day. In the letter, she described herself as a "Pro-MAGA Irish politician".

== Personal life ==
As of 2012, Keogan's partner was former Meath County Councillor and publican, Seamus O'Neill. Keogan, who has been involved in running a restaurant and public house business with her partner in Duleek since at least 2006, was included on a Revenue Commissioners "tax defaulters" list arising from a "€50,000 tax debt" owed by this business in 2013. Keogan was reportedly targeted by a stalker from 2013 until the man's arrest in 2015.
