= James McEntee =

James McEntee may refer to:

- James McEntee (Gaelic footballer), Irish Gaelic footballer who plays for Meath
- James McEntee (labor leader) (1884–1957), American machinist and labor leader

== See also ==
- James McEntee Academy, an elementary school
