= 1999 Meath County Council election =

Part of the 1999 Irish local elections

- 10 June 1999

All 29 seats to Meath County Council
	First party	Second party	Third party
Party	Fianna Fáil	Fine Gael	Sinn Féin
Seats won	14	11	1
Seat change	+1	+3	+1
	Fourth party	Fifth party
Party	Independent	Labour
Seats won	3	0
Seat change	-1	-4
- Map showing the area of Meath County Council
Council control after election
TBD

An election to Meath County Council took place on 10 June 1999 as part of that year's Irish local elections. 29 councillors were elected from five local electoral areas for a five-year term of office on the system of proportional representation by means of the single transferable vote (PR-STV).

== Results by party ==
Party	Seats	±	First Pref. votes	FPv%	±%
Fianna Fáil	14	+1	19,733	45.50	
Fine Gael	11	+3	13,285	30.63	
Sinn Féin	1	+1	926	2.14	
Independent	3	-1	6,142	14.16	
Labour	0	-4	2,929	6.75	
Totals	29	-	43,366	100.00	—

== Results by local electoral area ==
=== Dunshaughlin ===
Dunshaughlin - 6 seats
Party	Candidate	FPv%	Count						
Party	Candidate	FPv%	1	2	3	4	5	6	7
Independent	Brian Fitzgerald*	17.00	1,658						
Fianna Fáil	Oliver Brooks*	12.50	1,219	1,260	1,262	1,282	1,285	1,286	1,449
Fianna Fáil	Nick Killian	12.41	1,210	1,233	1,235	1,284	1,301	1,304	1,493
Fianna Fáil	Conor Tormey*	11.46	1,146	1,154	1,158	1,190	1,268	1,291	1,465
Fine Gael	John Fanning*	11.61	1,132	1,152	1,164	1,301	1,455		
Fianna Fáil	Noel Leonard	8.82	860	890	920	925	942	943	
Fine Gael	Mary Bergin	8.38	817	870	925	969	1,027	1,049	1,343
Fine Gael	Gillian Toole	7.98	778	814	823	908	956	967	995
Fine Gael	Damien McGuinness	3.99	389	401	406				
Labour	John King	3.45	336	350	459	469			
Labour	Mary Helion	2.12	207	234					
Electorate: 21,373 Valid: 9,752 (45.63%) Spoilt: 88 Quota: 1,394 Turnout: 9,840 (46.04%)

=== Kells ===
Kells - 6 seats
Party	Candidate	FPv%	Count					
Party	Candidate	FPv%	1	2	3	4	5	6
Fianna Fáil	Johnny Brady TD*	23.96	2,414					
Fine Gael	John V. Farrelly TD*	18.13	1,827					
Fianna Fáil	Liz McCormack	12.69	1,279	1,370	1,382	1,478		
Fianna Fáil	Michael Lynch*	11.93	1,202	1,705				
Fine Gael	Gerry Gibney*	9.55	962	1,022	1,173	1,184	1,593	
Fianna Fáil	James Weldon*	9.31	938	1,072	1,153	1,276	1,342	1,379
Labour	Tommy Grimes	8.80	887	1,019	1,057	1,078	1,220	1,336
Fine Gael	Padraig Shine	5.62	566	620	725	739		
Electorate: 19,502 Valid: 10,075 (51.66%) Spoilt: 208 Quota: 1,440 Turnout: 10,283 (52.73%)

=== Navan ===
Navan - 7 seats
Party	Candidate	FPv%	Count										
Party	Candidate	FPv%	1	2	3	4	5	6	7	8	9	10	11
Fianna Fáil	Tommy Reilly	13.11	1,316										
Fine Gael	Jim Holloway	9.88	991	996	1,008	1,050	1,082	1,133	1,312				
Fianna Fáil	Paddy Fitzsimons*	9.59	962	979	989	1,005	1,017	1,219	1,260				
Sinn Féin	Joe Reilly	9.23	926	931	945	996	1,017	1,048	1,066	1,067	1,067	1,106	1,236
Fine Gael	Patsy O'Neill*	8.33	836	838	850	862	871	879	959	977	978	1,157	1,192
Fianna Fáil	Jimmy Mangan	8.30	833	839	839	842	893	944	1,065	1,070	1,072	1,286	
Fine Gael	Damien English	6.43	645	648	653	686	715	762	855	881	882	930	1,033
Independent	Christy Gorman*	5.81	583	585	598	646	689	722	737	741	741	767	968
Fianna Fáil	Adrian O'Donnell	5.66	568	573	576	584	590	647	668	668	669		
Independent	Andy Brennan	5.58	560	563	572	599	625	650	668	671	671	681	
Fine Gael	Nichola McDonagh	5.23	525	527	533	547	614	643					
Fianna Fáil	Elaine Dowdall	5.22	524	532	540	543	566						
Green	Cathal Gogan	3.51	352	353	353	376							
Labour	Anton McCabe	2.22	223	224	311								
Labour	Rosaleen O'Brien	1.90	191	192									
Electorate: 22,196 Valid: 10,035 (45.21%) Spoilt: 146 Quota: 1,255 Turnout: 10,181 (45.87%)

=== Slane ===
Slane - 5 seats
Party	Candidate	FPv%	Count						
Party	Candidate	FPv%	1	2	3	4	5	6	7
Independent	Tom Kelly*	17.62	1,189						
Independent	Jimmy Cudden*	14.73	994	1,005	1,074	1,094	1,121	1,320	
Fianna Fáil	Hugh Gough*	14.32	966	968	1,032	1,127			
Fine Gael	Shaun Lynch*	12.63	852	860	897	909	1,118	1,203	
Fine Gael	Ann Dillon-Gallagher	10.61	716	717	745	750	812	839	871
Fianna Fáil	Linda Downes	6.97	470	472	481	614	638		
Fine Gael	Emir Smith-Duff	6.11	412	422	459	512			
Labour	Jimmy Gilna	6.05	408	424	455	527	668	714	750
Fianna Fáil	Noirin Dunne	5.77	389	400	418				
Green	Fergal O'Byrne	5.20	351	354					
Electorate: 16,272 Valid: 6,747 (41.46%) Spoilt: 109 Quota: 1,125 Turnout: 6,856 (42.13%)

=== Trim ===
Trim - 5 seats
Party	Candidate	FPv%	Count							
Party	Candidate	FPv%	1	2	3	4	5	6	7	8
Fianna Fáil	Jimmy Fegan	14.60	1,038	1,050	1,082	1,137	1,157	1,158	1,314	
Fianna Fáil	Seamus Murray*	13.84	984	1,019	1,026	1,052	1,142	1,142	1,279	
Fine Gael	Peter Higgins	13.64	970	983	1,042	1,137	1,194			
Fine Gael	Willie Carey*	12.20	867	891	894	918	1,040	1,046	1,107	1,118
Fianna Fáil	Gabriel Cribbin*	11.53	820	838	842	869	922	922	1,031	1,108
Fianna Fáil	Liam Ryan	8.37	595	597	613	683	698	699		
Independent	Phil Cantwell	7.65	544	566	586	703	764	765	837	850
Independent	Vincent McHugh	6.05	430	454	480					
Labour	Pat Holton	5.88	418	437	515	534				
Labour	Danny O'Brien	3.64	259	261						
Independent	Patrick Cummins	2.59	184							
Electorate: 17,128 Valid: 7,109 (41.51%) Spoilt: 115 Quota: 1,185 Turnout: 7,224 (42.18%)
