= Linda Nelson Murray =

Irish politician

Senator Linda Nelson Murray
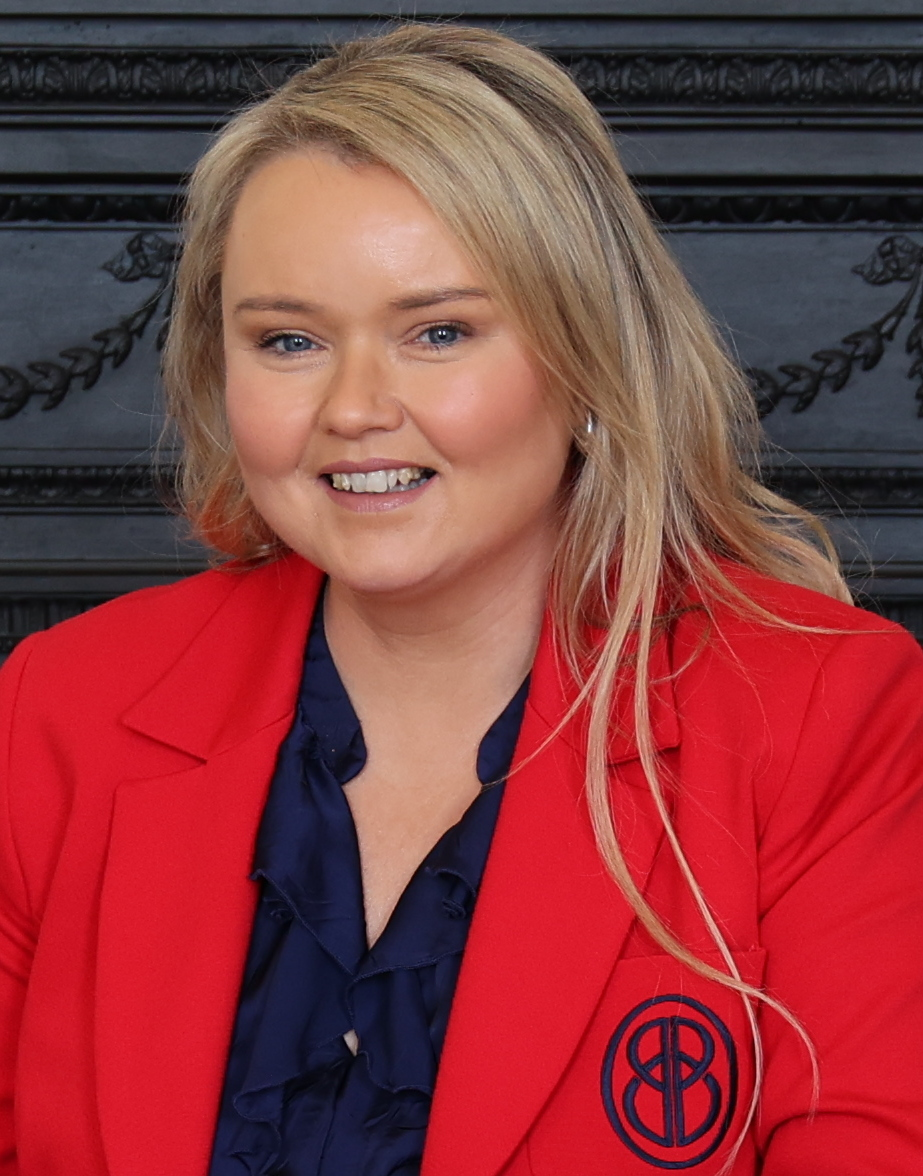
- Nelson Murray in 2025

Senator
- Incumbent
- Assumed office January 2025
- Constituency: Industrial and Commercial Panel

Meath County Councillor
- In office June 2024 – January 2025
- Constituency: Navan

Personal details
- Born: Linda Nelson County Meath, Ireland
- Party: Fine Gael
- Spouse: Finbarr Murray
- Children: 2

Linda Nelson Murray is an Irish Fine Gael politician who has been a senator for the Industrial and Commercial Panel since January 2025.

== Early and personal life ==
She lives in Kilmessan with her husband Finbarr Murray, and their two children. She worked as parliamentary assistant to former Meath TD Damien English.

== Political career ==
She was a member of Meath County Council for the Navan area from June 2024 to January 2025. She was an unsuccessful candidate for the Meath West constituency at the 2024 general election.
