= Gillian Toole =

Irish politician

Gillian Toole TD
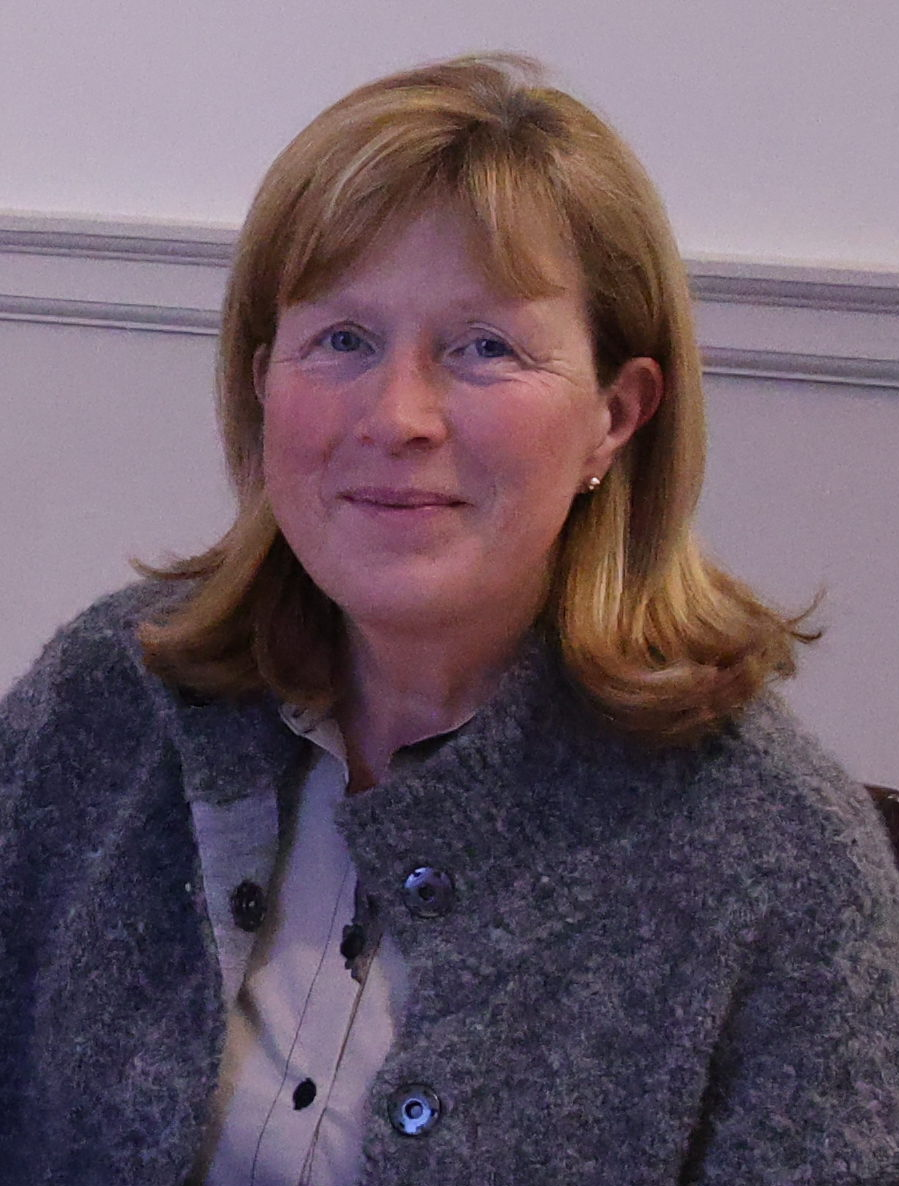
- Toole in 2024

Teachta Dála
- Incumbent
- Assumed office November 2024
- Constituency: Meath East

Personal details
- Party: Independent
- Other political affiliations: Fine Gael (until 2019)

Gillian Toole is an Irish independent politician who has been a Teachta Dála (TD) for the Meath East constituency since the 2024 general election. Toole was previously a Meath County Councillor from 2014 to 2024.

== Local politics ==
Toole was elected to Meath County Council as a member of Fine Gael at the 2014 Irish local elections for the Ratoath electoral area.

Toole resigned from Fine Gael in March 2019, citing frustration with the party's policies, particularly in relation to public transport, healthcare, and community safety. Toole, who had served as a Fine Gael councillor for five years, felt that the party no longer represented the needs of the people of Meath. Her decision came as a shock to local Fine Gael members, as she had been selected to run for the party in the 2019 local elections. In her resignation statement, Toole expressed dissatisfaction with the lack of improvement in areas she had campaigned for and said her experience working part-time in healthcare showed a need for greater attention to the sector.

Following her resignation, Toole continued her political career as an independent. However, the Fine Gael party was later drawn into controversy regarding alleged derogatory remarks made about Toole at a party meeting in Kells, County Meath. It was reported that former TD John V. Farrelly referred to Toole using offensive terms, including a racial slur and an expletive. The alleged comments were said to have been made in front of other party members at the meeting, which was attended by around 20 people. A complaint was filed with Fine Gael headquarters, and the party confirmed that it was investigating the matter. Farrelly issued an apology "for any offence caused", both during the meeting and afterwards, and announced his decision to step aside from his role as constituency chair pending the outcome of the investigation. A spokesperson for Fine Gael stated that such language had no place in public life and was completely unacceptable. Toole, who had left the party ahead of the local elections, did not comment publicly on the incident at the time.

Toole was re-elected to Meath County Council as an independent member at the 2019 and 2024 local elections.

== National politics ==
Toole's bid for the Dáil in 2024 was endorsed and supported by Senator Sharon Keogan. Toole received 4,459 first preferences votes (8.9%) at the 2024 general election in Meath East, and was elected on the 13th count. She was part of the Regional Independents Group led by Michael Lowry that negotiated the programme for government and one of four members of that group who subsequently sought opposition speaking time in the Dáil despite being affiliated with the government. The Ceann Comhairle, Verona Murphy, however, ruled that government-affiliated TDs could not form a Technical group.

Dáil	Election	Deputy (Party)	Deputy (Party)	Deputy (Party)	Deputy (Party)
30th	2007	Thomas Byrne (FF)	Mary Wallace (FF)	Shane McEntee (FG)	3 seats 2007–2024
31st	2011	Dominic Hannigan (Lab)	Regina Doherty (FG)	Shane McEntee (FG)	3 seats 2007–2024
31st	2013 by-election	Dominic Hannigan (Lab)	Regina Doherty (FG)	Helen McEntee (FG)	3 seats 2007–2024
32nd	2016	Thomas Byrne (FF)	Regina Doherty (FG)	Helen McEntee (FG)	3 seats 2007–2024
33rd	2020	Thomas Byrne (FF)	Darren O'Rourke (SF)	Helen McEntee (FG)	3 seats 2007–2024
34th	2024	Thomas Byrne (FF)	Darren O'Rourke (SF)	Helen McEntee (FG)	Gillian Toole (Ind.)
