= County Hall, Navan =

Municipal building in County Meath, Ireland

- Halla an Chontae, An Uaimh
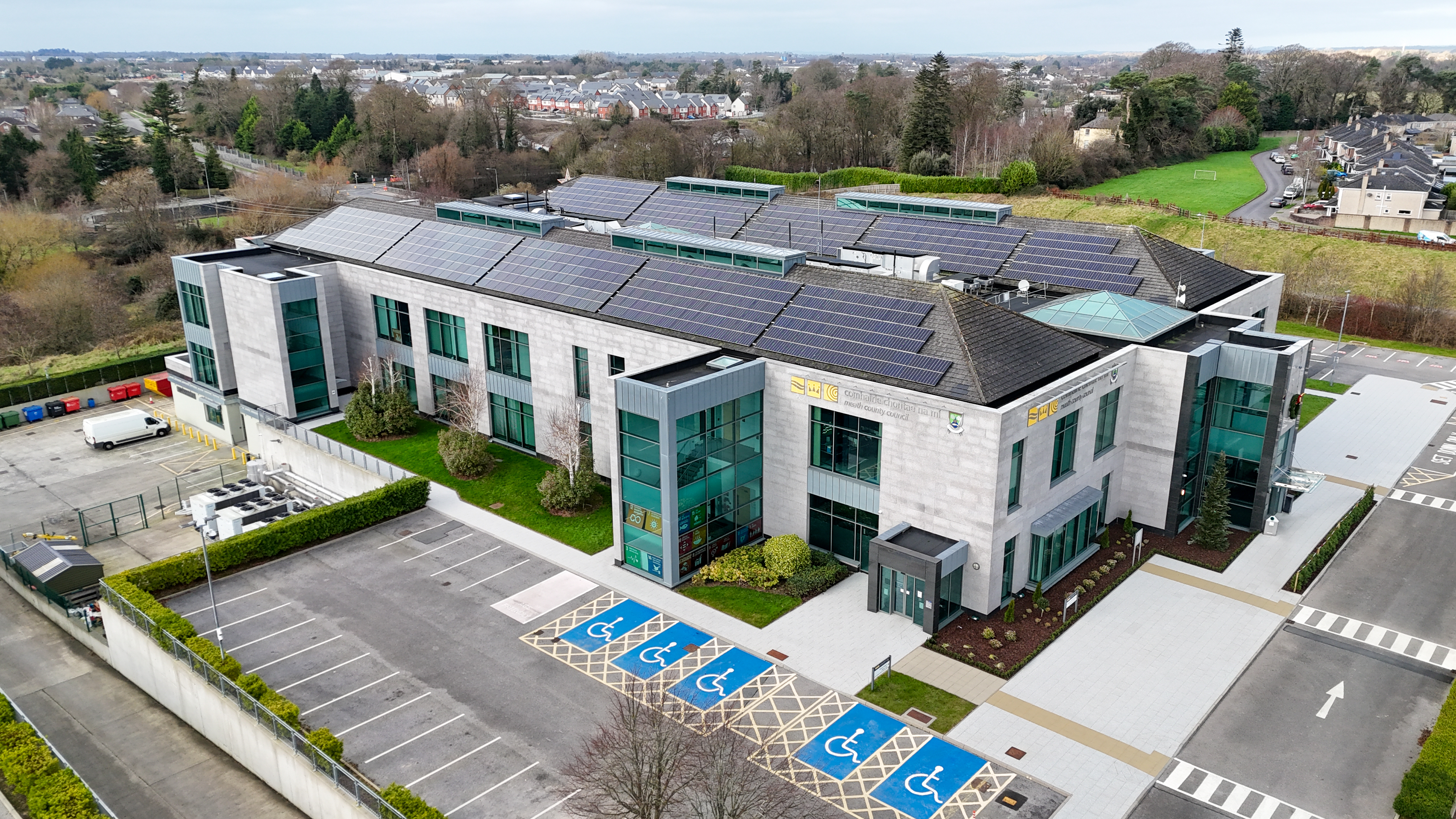
- County Hall, Navan in 2025

- Location within Ireland

General information
- Location: Dublin Road, Navan, Ireland
- Coordinates: 53.6427°N 6.6674°W
- Completed: 2010

Design and construction
- Architect: Bucholz McEvoy

County Hall is a municipal facility on Dublin Road in Navan, County Meath, Ireland.

== History ==
The building, which was originally commissioned as a call centre for Quinn Insurance, was completed in early 2010. After Quinn Insurance went into administration in March 2010, Meath County Council, which had previously occupied ageing offices in Railway Street, acquired the building for €5.1 million in 2013. The county council then refurbished the building to a design by Bucholz McEvoy at a further cost of €2.1 million and then established its headquarters there in 2017.
