= Shane McEntee (Gaelic footballer) =

Gaelic footballer

Shane McEntee is a Gaelic footballer who plays in midfield for St Peters Dunboyne and the Meath county team. He has captained his county. His cousin James plays behind him in defence for Meath.

He is an officer in the Defence Forces.

McEntee played for Meath in the final of the 2012 All-Ireland Minor Football Championship, with Meath being managed by his father Andy.

When his father left as Meath manager after the 2022 All-Ireland Senior Football Championship exit, McEntee answered claims that the Meath County Board paid to fly him back to Ireland from Mali (where he was on a tour of duty) in advance of the Leinster SFC semi-final defeat to Dublin by stating that he paid his own fare.

Shane McEntee is the nephew of former Meath footballer, Gerry. Another uncle, Shane, was a Fine Gael politician, who was a Teachta Dála (TD) from 2005 until his death in 2012. His daughter Helen succeeded him.
