= Andy McEntee =

Gaelic football manager

Personal information
- Native name: Aindréas Mac an tSaoi (Irish)

Sport
Club management
- Years: Club
- Until 2016: Ballyboden St Enda's
Club titles as manager
Club	County	Province	All-Ireland
?	1	1	1
Inter-county management
- Years: Team
- 2016–2022 2022–2025: Meath; Antrim

Andy McEntee is a Gaelic football manager. He was manager of the Antrim county team between 2022 and 2025, having managed his native Meath between 2016 and 2022.

== Career ==
McEntee managed Meath to the final of the 2012 All-Ireland Minor Football Championship. He led Ballyboden St Enda's of Dublin to the 2015–16 All-Ireland Senior Club Football Championship. He was named as Meath manager in August 2016.

In 2019, he led Meath back to Division 1 of the National Football League for the first time since 2006.

He led Meath to Leinster finals in 2018 and 2019.

He left after Meath exited the 2022 All-Ireland Senior Football Championship.

Then McEntee was unexpectedly appointed as Antrim county football team senior manager on a three-year term.

He saw out that term, and then stepped down.

== Personal life ==
His son Shane plays for Meath.

Andy McEntee is the younger brother of former Meath footballer, Gerry. Another brother, Shane, was a Fine Gael politician, who was a Teachta Dála (TD) from 2005 until his death in 2012. His daughter Helen succeeded him. Helen McEntee became her Minister for Justice in June 2020.

Sporting positions
Preceded by Mick O'Dowd	Meath Senior Football Manager; 2016–2022	Succeeded by Colm O'Rourke
Preceded by Enda McGinley	Antrim Senior Football Manager; 2022–2025	Succeeded by Vacant
