= 2005 Meath by-election =

By-election to the 29th Dáil

- 11 March 2005
- Turnout: 50,183 (41.5%)
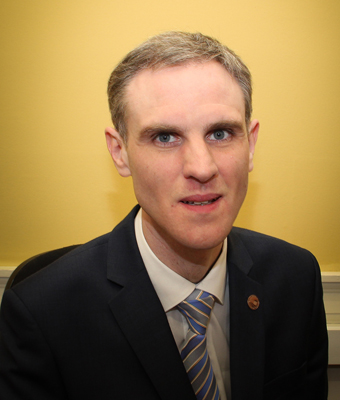

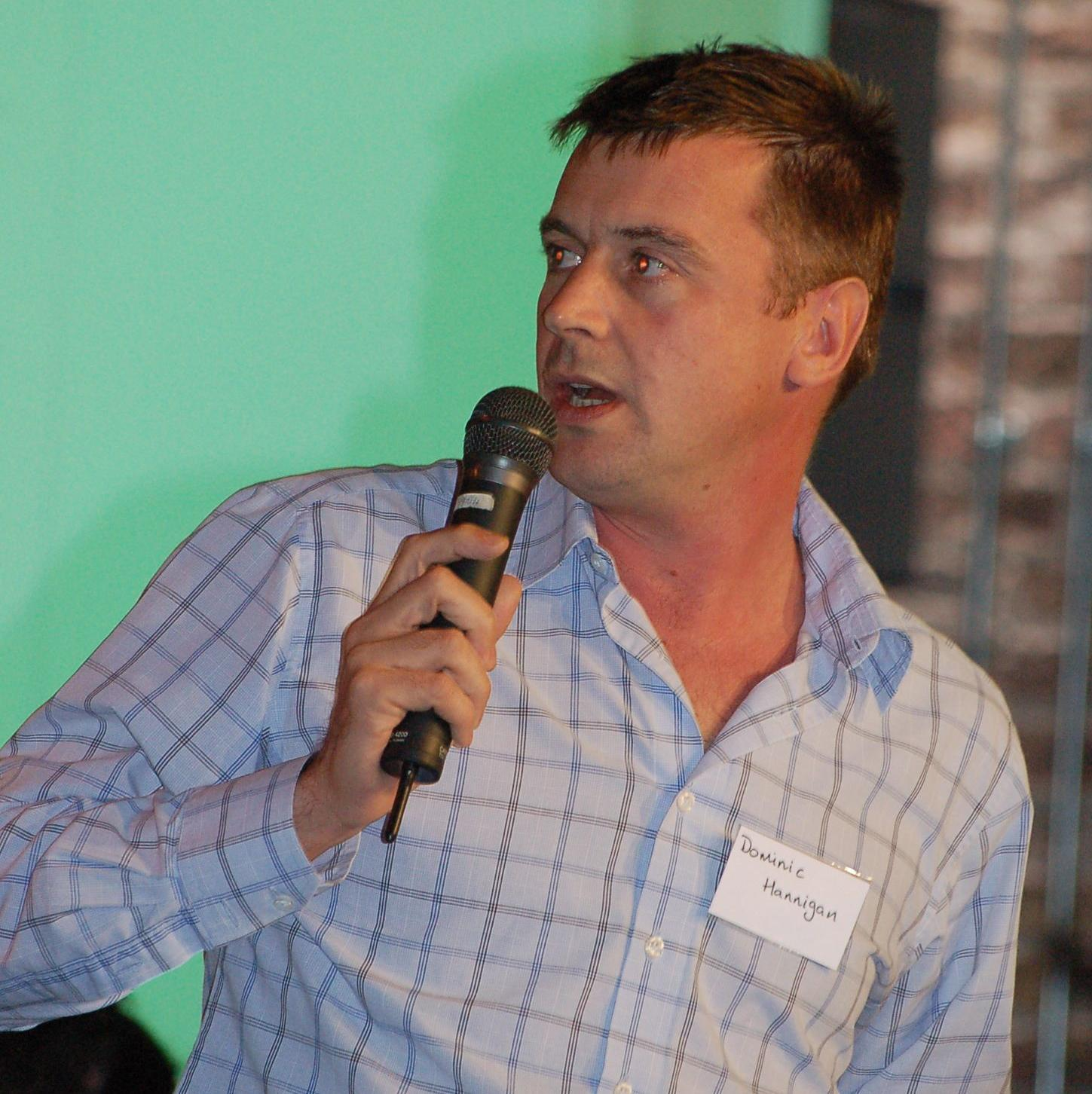
	McEntee
Nominee	Shane McEntee	Shane Cassells	Dominic Hannigan
Party	Fine Gael	Fianna Fáil	Labour
First preferences	16,964	16,117	5,567
Percentage	34.1%	32.4%	11.2%
Final count	24,047	21,178	–
- Meath shown within Ireland
TD before election
John Bruton
Fine Gael
TD after election
Shane McEntee
Fine Gael

A Dáil by-election was held in the constituency of Meath in Ireland on Friday, 11 March 2005, to fill a vacancy in the 29th Dáil. It followed the resignation of Fine Gael Teachta Dála (TD) John Bruton on 31 October 2004 to take up his new position as European Union ambassador to the United States.

The writ of election to fill the vacancy was agreed by the Dáil on 15 February 2005.

Tommy Reilly, the original Fianna Fáil candidate, was forced to stand aside due to land rezoning issues.

On 15 February 2005, the campaign began when it was announced that polling would take place on 11 March 2005. Seven candidates contested the by-election, and it was won by the Fine Gael candidate, Shane McEntee.

It was held on the same day as the 2005 Kildare North by-election. Both were the final occasions which the Progressive Democrats contested by-elections.

Meath was divided at the 2007 general election. McEntee was elected for Meath East.

== Result ==
2005 Meath by-election
Party	Candidate	FPv%	Count			
Party	Candidate	FPv%	1	2	3	4
Fine Gael	Shane McEntee	34.1	16,964	17,083	18,214	24,047
Fianna Fáil	Shane Cassells	32.4	16,117	16,230	17,480	21,178
Sinn Féin	Joe Reilly	12.3	6,087	6,183	6,514	
Labour	Dominic Hannigan	11.2	5,567	5,672	7,061	
Progressive Democrats	Sirena Campbell	5.4	2,679	2,746		
Green	Fergal O'Byrne	3.2	1,590	1,744		
Independent	Liam Ó Gogáin	1.4	702			
Electorate: 121,041 Valid: 49,706 Spoilt: 477 (0.9%) Quota: 24,854 Turnout: 50,183 (41.5%)
