= Oluwayemisi Oluremi Obilade =

Nigerian academic (born 1958)

Professor Oluyemisi Oluremi Obilade
- Education: Obafemi Awolowo University
- Occupation: Academics
- Employer: Obafemi Awolowo University
- Known for: her influential role in higher education
- Spouse: Prof. T. Obilade

Oluyemisi Oluremi Obilade is a Nigerian academic, she is a former vice chancellor of Tai Solarin University of Education (TASUED).

== Life ==
Obilade is a professor of Adult Education and Women Studies from the Obafemi Awolowo University, Ile-Ife, Nigeria. She was the Head of Department, Department of Continuing Education at the Obafemi Awolowo University at the time of her appointment as vice-chancellor of the Tai Solarin University of Education (in Ijagun, Ijebu-Ode, Ogun). She holds a Bachelor of Education degree (History/English, 1980) and a Master of Arts degree in Adult Education (1984) from the University of Ife. She also has a doctorate in Education from OAU.

She became the vice chancellor of Tai Solarin University of Education (TASUED) in January 2013, succeeding Segun Awonusi.

She has been a consultant/resource person to several public and private institutions and corporations. She has assisted in building the technical capacity of organizations and institutions; engendering corporations and institutions (public and private); assisted in the introduction of Women's Studies into the Adult Education curricular at the OAU and TASUED; and changing attitudes and perceptions on women's issues and status in communities.

She was a commissioner for Education and Acting Commissioner for Health in Osun State, South west Nigeria.

== Publications ==
Published Journal Articles:

- Obilade, O.O. (2008), "Breaking the Glass Ceiling: Promoting Gender Equity Through Affirmative Action in a Nigerian University", C.D of Conference Proceedings, Gender and Positive Action: Empowering or Disabling, 2nd Biennial Women's Studies Conference, Izmir Turkey; Izmir University of Economics.
- Obilade, O.O. and Adelabu, M.A. (2009), Balancing the Equation: Enhancing Women’s Access and Visibility in Tertiary Education Leadership in Nigeria, in Baytekin, B. et al (eds.) Uluslararasi – Disiplinlerarasi Kadin Calismalari Kongresi, Sakarya Turkey, Sakarya University.
- Obilade, O.O. and Adewale, T.O.(2009), My Body, My Sexuality: Tracking Emerging Gender Relations in a Nigerian University, in Baytekin, B. et al (eds) Uluslararasi – Disiplinlerarasi Kadin Calismalari Kongresi, Sakarya Turkey, Sakarya University.
- Obilade, O.O. (2015), Calling Those Things That Are Not as Though They Were: Women and the Development of the Academe in the 21st Century University, Proceedings of the 1st Interdisciplinary Conference of UCC-TASUED 2015, Education as a Tool for Global Development, University of Cape-Coast, Ghana.
