= Yemi Adenuga =

Nigerian-Irish politician

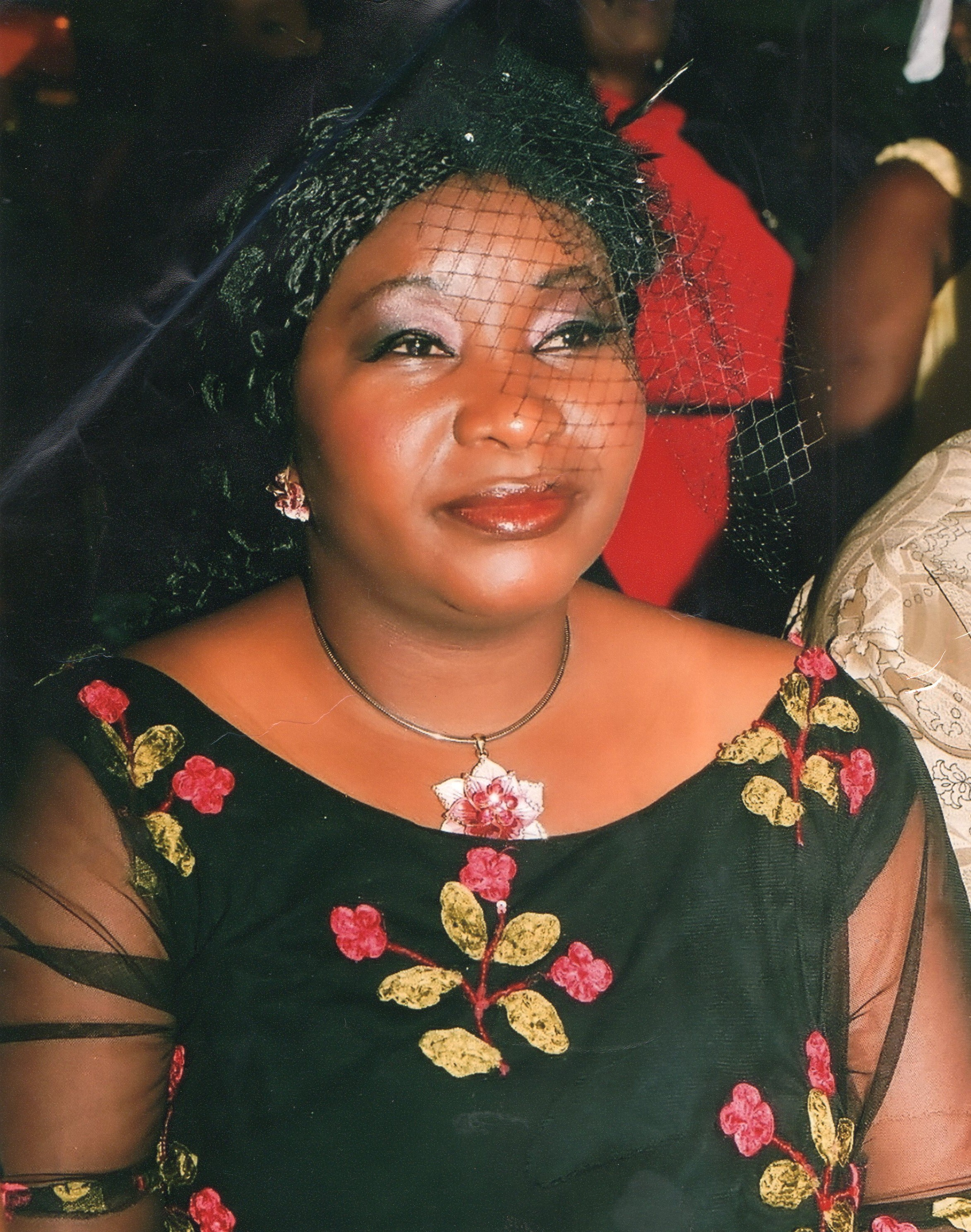
- Adenuga in 2012

Meath County Council
- Incumbent
- Assumed office May 2019

Personal details
- Born: Oluwayemi Solaru Nigeria
- Party: Fine Gael
- Spouse: Deji Adenuga
- Education: Liverpool John Moores University; University College Dublin

Oluwayemi "Yemi" Adenuga (née Solaru) is a Nigerian-Irish politician, community organiser and advocate for social justice initiatives. In May 2019, she became the first elected black female public representative in Ireland when she was elected to Meath County Council. She has also founded mentoring programs for women and youth, appeared on the television show Gogglebox Ireland, and worked as a radio and television broadcaster.

== Early life and education ==
Adenuga was born in Nigeria, and raised in a town outside of Lagos. She was the sixteenth of 27 children of a father with seven wives. In 2020, Adenuga told the Irish Independent, "I grew up in circumstances where, as a girl, I wasn't given a chance."

Adenuga completed a Diploma in Business Studies in 2008, a Bachelors of Business Studies in 2010, and a post-graduate certificate in 2016 from University College Dublin. She completed her MBA at Liverpool John Moores University.

== Career ==
Adenuga worked as a radio and television broadcaster in Nigeria for ten years before moving to Ireland in 2000. In 2004, after moving to Ireland with her family, she didn't find media industry work but instead found work in accounting.

Adenuga appeared on the reality television show Gogglebox Ireland for four years before deciding to run for elected office. After being active in the community of Navan for years, she initially declined an offer from Fine Gael to become involved in politics, but later changed her mind and in 2019, became the first elected black female public representative in Ireland, and the first migrant councillor on Meath County Council. Adenuga has said she did not consider race when she agreed to run for office, but encountered bigotry while campaigning "that in itself was the very reason why I was even more determined to win."

Soon after the election, she joined with councillor Hazel Chu in calling for urgent action to address racism. In 2020, after the murder of George Floyd, Meath County Council approved her motion to fund an educational initiative and become the first county in Ireland to openly take action against racism. She has also advocated for hate crimes legislation in Ireland that includes penalties for online harassment, and helped organise an online rally against racism.

Adenuga has launched several community initiatives, including the women and youth empowerment programs Sheroes Global Initiative and The Boys-to-Men project aimed at raising boys to be good men, the Meath Stand Against Racism education campaign, Sheroes Global, to support women and youth, and the Yemi Adenuga Mentorship and Leadership Program (YAMAL), to mentor women and youth. She also serves on the board of Cultúr, a community organization that supports migrants, asylum seekers and refugees.

Adenuga began the Sheroes program in Ireland in 2012, and launched the program in Nigeria in 2018, after conducting projects in the country for two years.

Adenuga and her husband also manage Nigerian Carnival Ireland, a cultural, diversity and inclusion company that delivers programs in Ireland and Nigeria.

== Personal life ==
Adenuga is the mother of four children and is married to Deji Adenuga, a Nigerian actor, who was also her campaign manager.
