= Shane McEntee (politician) =

Irish politician (1956–2012)

- McEntee in 2010

Minister of State
- 2011–2012: Agriculture, Food and the Marine

Teachta Dála
- In office May 2007 – 21 December 2012
- Constituency: Meath East
- In office March 2005 – May 2007
- Constituency: Meath

Personal details
- Born: 19 December 1956 Nobber, County Meath, Ireland
- Died: 21 December 2012 (aged 56) Castletown-Kilpatrick, County Meath, Ireland
- Cause of death: Suicide by hanging
- Party: Fine Gael
- Spouse: Kathleen McEntee
- Children: 4, including Helen
- Relatives: Andy McEntee (brother); Gerry McEntee (brother)
- Education: University College Dublin

Shane McEntee (19 December 1956 – 21 December 2012) was an Irish Fine Gael politician who served as Minister of State at the Department of Agriculture, Food and the Marine from 2011 to 2012. He served as a Teachta Dála (TD) from 2005 to 2012.

== Early life and family ==
McEntee was born in the village of Nobber in County Meath. He had seven siblings. His father Tony died in March 2011 at the age of 86, while his mother Madge outlived him.

He became an active member of Fine Gael when he joined the party at the age of 15. Before being elected, he worked as a farmer and agricultural sales representative. He ran the "Dee Local Bar".

McEntee was also very involved in the GAA, both as trainer and player (until an injury ended his promising career). He played at the back with Nobber, and won the 1983 Feis Cup, managed the Meath minor team during the 1990s, and led three clubs (Ballinlough, Syddan, and Castletown) to finals of the Meath Intermediate Football Championship, with two wins from the three. His brother Gerry is a renowned surgeon, who won the All-Ireland Senior Football Championship with Meath in 1987 and 1988. Another brother, Andy went on to manage Meath, while Andy's son Shane also played for Meath, both after the death of their brother and uncle respectively.

He was married with three daughters and a son. His daughter Helen succeeded him as TD for Meath East after his death.

== Politics ==
A close friend of Taoiseach Enda Kenny, McEntee's election candidacy began in 2004 when he was selected as the Fine Gael candidate in the Meath by-election, which was triggered by the resignation from the Dáil of former leader Fine Gael, John Bruton. Polling was on 11 March 2005, and McEntee narrowly beat the Fianna Fáil candidate Shane Cassells, and was elected to the 29th Dáil.

McEntee was re-elected at the 2007 and 2011 general elections. He was the Fine Gael deputy spokesperson on Agriculture, Fisheries and Food with special responsibility for Food and Fisheries from 2007 to 2011. McEntee gave an impassioned speech in defence of party leader Enda Kenny during the 2010 Fine Gael leadership challenge. McEntee was also a successful campaigner on behalf of families in counties Dublin, Meath and Kildare whose homes had been damaged by pyrite in stone used in the foundations.

On 10 March 2011, he was appointed as the Minister of State at the Department of Agriculture, Food and the Marine with responsibility for Food, Horticulture and Food Safety.

== Death ==
McEntee died by suicide on 21 December 2012, two days after his 56th birthday. McEntee had been feeling under pressure because of criticism of a number of Government budgetary decisions. His funeral took place on 24 December 2012. An inquest later returned a verdict of "asphyxiation by ligature".

The by-election for his seat was held on 27 March 2013, and was won by his daughter Helen.

Political offices
Preceded by Ciarán Cuffe; Seán Connick as Ministers of State at the Department of Agriculture and Food	Minister of State at the Department of Agriculture, Food and the Marine; 2011–2012	Succeeded by Tom Hayes
Sporting positions
Preceded by Gerry Cooney	Meath Minor Football manager 2000–2001	Succeeded by Benny Reddy

Dáil	Election	Deputy (Party)	Deputy (Party)	Deputy (Party)
4th	1923	Patrick Mulvany (FP)	David Hall (Lab)	Eamonn Duggan (CnaG)
5th	1927 (Jun)	Matthew O'Reilly (FF)	David Hall (Lab)	Eamonn Duggan (CnaG)
6th	1927 (Sep)	Matthew O'Reilly (FF)	Arthur Matthews (CnaG)	Eamonn Duggan (CnaG)
7th	1932	James Kelly (FF)	Arthur Matthews (CnaG)	Eamonn Duggan (CnaG)
8th	1933	James Kelly (FF)	Robert Davitt (CnaG)	Matthew O'Reilly (FF)
9th	1937	Constituency abolished. See Meath–Westmeath		

Dáil	Election	Deputy (Party)	Deputy (Party)	Deputy (Party)	Deputy (Party)	Deputy (Party)
13th	1948	Matthew O'Reilly (FF)	Michael Hilliard (FF)	3 seats until 1977	Patrick Giles (FG)	3 seats until 1977
14th	1951	Matthew O'Reilly (FF)	Michael Hilliard (FF)	3 seats until 1977	Patrick Giles (FG)	3 seats until 1977
15th	1954	James Tully (Lab)	Michael Hilliard (FF)	3 seats until 1977	Patrick Giles (FG)	3 seats until 1977
16th	1957	James Griffin (FF)	Michael Hilliard (FF)	3 seats until 1977	Patrick Giles (FG)	3 seats until 1977
16th	1959 by-election	Henry Johnston (FF)	Michael Hilliard (FF)	3 seats until 1977	Patrick Giles (FG)	3 seats until 1977
17th	1961	James Tully (Lab)	Michael Hilliard (FF)	3 seats until 1977	Denis Farrelly (FG)	3 seats until 1977
18th	1965	James Tully (Lab)	Michael Hilliard (FF)	3 seats until 1977	Denis Farrelly (FG)	3 seats until 1977
19th	1969	James Tully (Lab)	Michael Hilliard (FF)	3 seats until 1977	John Bruton (FG)	3 seats until 1977
20th	1973	James Tully (Lab)	Brendan Crinion (FF)	3 seats until 1977	John Bruton (FG)	3 seats until 1977
21st	1977	James Tully (Lab)	Brendan Crinion (FF)	Jim Fitzsimons (FF)	John Bruton (FG)	4 seats 1977–1981
22nd	1981	James Tully (Lab)	Brendan Crinion (FF)	Jim Fitzsimons (FF)	John Bruton (FG)	John V. Farrelly (FG)
23rd	1982 (Feb)	Michael Lynch (FF)	Colm Hilliard (FF)	Jim Fitzsimons (FF)	John Bruton (FG)	John V. Farrelly (FG)
24th	1982 (Nov)	Frank McLoughlin (Lab)	Colm Hilliard (FF)	Jim Fitzsimons (FF)	John Bruton (FG)	John V. Farrelly (FG)
25th	1987	Michael Lynch (FF)	Colm Hilliard (FF)	Noel Dempsey (FF)	John Bruton (FG)	John V. Farrelly (FG)
26th	1989	Mary Wallace (FF)	Colm Hilliard (FF)	Noel Dempsey (FF)	John Bruton (FG)	John V. Farrelly (FG)
27th	1992	Mary Wallace (FF)	Colm Hilliard (FF)	Noel Dempsey (FF)	John Bruton (FG)	Brian Fitzgerald (Lab)
28th	1997	Mary Wallace (FF)	Johnny Brady (FF)	Noel Dempsey (FF)	John Bruton (FG)	John V. Farrelly (FG)
29th	2002	Mary Wallace (FF)	Johnny Brady (FF)	Noel Dempsey (FF)	John Bruton (FG)	Damien English (FG)
29th	2005 by-election	Mary Wallace (FF)	Johnny Brady (FF)	Noel Dempsey (FF)	Shane McEntee (FG)	Damien English (FG)
30th	2007	Constituency abolished. See Meath East and Meath West				

Dáil	Election	Deputy (Party)	Deputy (Party)	Deputy (Party)	Deputy (Party)
30th	2007	Thomas Byrne (FF)	Mary Wallace (FF)	Shane McEntee (FG)	3 seats 2007–2024
31st	2011	Dominic Hannigan (Lab)	Regina Doherty (FG)	Shane McEntee (FG)	3 seats 2007–2024
31st	2013 by-election	Dominic Hannigan (Lab)	Regina Doherty (FG)	Helen McEntee (FG)	3 seats 2007–2024
32nd	2016	Thomas Byrne (FF)	Regina Doherty (FG)	Helen McEntee (FG)	3 seats 2007–2024
33rd	2020	Thomas Byrne (FF)	Darren O'Rourke (SF)	Helen McEntee (FG)	3 seats 2007–2024
34th	2024	Thomas Byrne (FF)	Darren O'Rourke (SF)	Helen McEntee (FG)	Gillian Toole (Ind.)
