= Meath County Council =

Local authority of County Meath in Ireland

Meath County Council Comhairle Chontae na Mí

Type
- Type: County council of County Meath

History
- Founded: 1 April 1899

Leadership
- Cathaoirleach: Sarah Reilly, FG

Structure
- Seats: 40
- Political groups: Fine Gael (11) Fianna Fáil (9) Sinn Féin (6) Aontú (2) Social Democrats (1) Independent (11)

Elections
- Last election: 7 June 2024

Motto
- Tré Neart le Chéile (Irish) "Stronger Together"

Meeting place
- County Hall, Navan

Website
- Official website

Meath County Council (Irish: Comhairle Chontae na Mí) is the local authority of County Meath, Ireland. As a county council, it is governed by the Local Government Act 2001. The council is responsible for housing and community, roads and transportation, urban planning and development, amenity and culture, and environment. The council has 40 elected members. Elections are held every five years and are by single transferable vote. The head of the council has the title of Cathaoirleach (chairperson). The county administration is headed by a chief executive, Kieran Kehoe. The county town is Navan.

== History ==
Meath County Council was established on 1 April 1899 under the Local Government (Ireland) Act 1898 for the administrative county of County Meath, succeeding the judicial county of Meath.

Meath County Council commissioned a purpose-built headquarters at Railway Street in Navan in the early 20th century. It then moved to more modern facilities at the new County Hall on the Dublin Road in Navan in 2017.

== Regional Assembly ==
Meath County Council has three representatives on the Eastern and Midland Regional Assembly who are part of the Eastern Strategic Planning Area Committee.

== Elections ==
The Local Government (Ireland) Act 1919 introduced the electoral system of proportional representation by means of the single transferable vote (PR-STV) for the 1920 Irish local elections. County Meath was divided into 5 county electoral areas to elect the 21 members of the council. This electoral system has been retained, with 40 members of Meath County Council now elected for a five-year term of office from 6 multi-member local electoral areas (LEAs).

Year	FG	FF	SF	Aon	Lab	SD	GP	WP	CnaT	NLP	FP	CnaG	Rep	SF (pre-1922)	IrishNat	Ind.	Total
2024	11	9	6	2	0	1	0	0	—N/a	—N/a	—N/a	—N/a	—N/a	—N/a	—N/a	11	40
2019	12	12	3	1	1	1	0	0	—N/a	—N/a	—N/a	—N/a	—N/a	—N/a	—N/a	10	40
2014	13	10	8	—N/a	0	—N/a	0	0	—N/a	—N/a	—N/a	—N/a	—N/a	—N/a	—N/a	9	40
2009	11	8	1	—N/a	4	—N/a	0	0	—N/a	—N/a	—N/a	—N/a	—N/a	—N/a	—N/a	5	29
2004	9	12	2	—N/a	0	—N/a	1	0	—N/a	—N/a	—N/a	—N/a	—N/a	—N/a	—N/a	5	29
1999	11	14	1	—N/a	0	—N/a	0	0	—N/a	—N/a	—N/a	—N/a	—N/a	—N/a	—N/a	3	29
1991	9	12	0	—N/a	5	—N/a	0	1	—N/a	—N/a	—N/a	—N/a	—N/a	—N/a	—N/a	3	29
1985	7	17	0	—N/a	3	—N/a	0	0	—N/a	—N/a	—N/a	—N/a	—N/a	—N/a	—N/a	2	29
1979	9	13	0	—N/a	5	—N/a	0	0	—N/a	—N/a	—N/a	—N/a	—N/a	—N/a	—N/a	2	29
1974	8	14	0	—N/a	5	—N/a	0	0	—N/a	—N/a	—N/a	—N/a	—N/a	—N/a	—N/a	2	29
1967	10	14	0	—N/a	4	—N/a	—N/a	—N/a	—N/a	—N/a	0	—N/a	—N/a	—N/a	—N/a	1	29
1960	8	15	0	—N/a	4	—N/a	—N/a	—N/a	0	—N/a	—N/a	—N/a	—N/a	—N/a	—N/a	2	29
1955	10	14	0	—N/a	3	—N/a	—N/a	—N/a	0	—N/a	—N/a	—N/a	—N/a	—N/a	—N/a	2	29
1950	6	17	0	—N/a	1	—N/a	—N/a	—N/a	0	1	—N/a	—N/a	—N/a	—N/a	—N/a	3	28
1945	1	14	0	—N/a	3	—N/a	—N/a	—N/a	2	1		—N/a	—N/a	—N/a	—N/a	8 (Note: Includes 1 Old IRA.)	29
1942	2	11	0	—N/a	7	—N/a	—N/a	—N/a	3	—N/a	—N/a	—N/a	—N/a	—N/a	—N/a	6	29
1934	15	19	0	—N/a	0	—N/a	—N/a	—N/a	—N/a	—N/a	—N/a	—N/a	—N/a	—N/a	—N/a	1	35
1928	—N/a	5	0	—N/a	10	—N/a	—N/a	—N/a	—N/a	—N/a	14	0	—N/a	—N/a	—N/a	6 (Note: Includes 1 Independent Labour.)	35
1925	—N/a	—N/a	—N/a	—N/a	9	—N/a	—N/a	—N/a	—N/a	—N/a	15	6	2	—N/a	—N/a	3	35
1920	—N/a	—N/a	—N/a	—N/a	0	—N/a	—N/a	—N/a	—N/a	—N/a	—N/a	—N/a	—N/a	20 (Note: Includes 2 Sinn Féin Labour)	0	1 (Note: Includes 1 Farmer's Union Candidate.)	21
1914	—N/a	—N/a	—N/a	—N/a		—N/a	—N/a	—N/a	—N/a	—N/a	—N/a	—N/a	—N/a				31
1911	—N/a	—N/a	—N/a	—N/a		—N/a	—N/a	—N/a	—N/a	—N/a	—N/a	—N/a	—N/a				31
1908	—N/a	—N/a	—N/a	—N/a		—N/a	—N/a	—N/a	—N/a	—N/a	—N/a	—N/a	—N/a				31
1905	—N/a	—N/a	—N/a	—N/a		—N/a	—N/a	—N/a	—N/a	—N/a	—N/a	—N/a	—N/a				31
1902	—N/a	—N/a	—N/a	—N/a		—N/a	—N/a	—N/a	—N/a	—N/a	—N/a	—N/a	—N/a	—N/a			31
1899	—N/a	—N/a	—N/a	—N/a		—N/a	—N/a	—N/a	—N/a	—N/a	—N/a	—N/a	—N/a	—N/a	21		21

== Local electoral areas and municipal districts ==
The area governed by the council

County Meath is divided into LEAs, defined by electoral divisions, and into municipal districts which exercise powers of the council locally.

Municipal District and LEA	Definition	Seats
Ashbourne	Ardmulchan, Donaghmore, Kentstown, Kilbrew, Rathfeigh, Skreen, Stamullin, Tara; those parts of the electoral division of Ardcath not contained in the local electoral area of Laytown—Bettystown; and those parts of the electoral division of Ratoath to the east of a line drawn along the M2 motorway	6
Kells	An Ráth Mhór, Ardagh, Baile Átha Buí, Ballinlough, Balrathboyne, Boherboy, Burry, Carrickleck, Castlekeeran, Castletown, Ceanannas Mór Rural (part), Ceanannas Mór Urban, Crossakeel, Crosskeys, Cruicetown, Domhnach Phádraig, Drumcondra, Girley, Grennanstown, Killallon, Killeagh, Kilmainham, Kilskeer, Knocklough, Loughan, Maperath, Martry, Moybolgue, Moylagh, Moynalty, Newcastle, Newtown, Nobber, Oldcastle, Posseckstown, Rathkenny, Staholmog, Stonefield, Tailtin and Trohanny	7
Laytown—Bettystown	Duleek, Grangegeeth, Julianstown, Killary, Mellifont, Painestown, Slane, St. Marys (part), Stackallan; and those parts of the electoral division of Ardcath north of a line drawn as follows: Commencing at the intersection of the boundary between the townlands of Bellewstown and Prioryland with the R152 road and then proceeding in a north-easterly direction along the R152 road to its intersection with the R150 road; then proceeding in an easterly direction along the R150 road to its intersection with the boundary between the electoral divisions of Ardcath and Duleek	7
Navan	Ardbraccan, Bective, Navan Rural and Navan Urban	7
Ratoath	Culmullin, Dunboyne, Dunshaughlin, Killeen, Kilmessan, Kilmore, Rodanstown; and those parts of the electoral division of Ratoath not contained in the local electoral area of Ashbourne	7
Trim	Ardnamullan, Ballyboggan, Ballyconnell, Castlejordan, Castlerickard, Cill Bhríde, Cloghbrack, Clonmacduff, Gallow, Galtrim, Hill of Down, Innfield, Kilcooly, Kildalkey, Killaconnigan, Killyon, Laracor, Rahinstown, Rathmolyon, Summerhill, Trim Rural and Trim Urban	6

== Councillors ==
The following were elected at the 2024 Meath County Council election.

=== 2024 seats summary ===
Party	Seats
Fine Gael	11
Fianna Fáil	9
Sinn Féin	6
Aontú	2
Social Democrats	1
Independent	11

=== Councillors by electoral area ===
This list reflects the order in which councillors were elected on 7 June 2024.

Council members from 2024 election
LEA	Name	Party
Ashbourne	Joe Bonner	Independent
Ashbourne	Amanda Smith	Independent
Ashbourne	Alan Tobin	Fine Gael
Ashbourne	Suzanna Jamal	Fine Gael
Ashbourne	Conor Tormey	Fianna Fáil
Ashbourne	Helen Meyer	Sinn Féin
Kells	Sarah Reilly	Fine Gael
Kells	Eugene Cassidy	Fine Gael
Kells	Sean Drew	Fianna Fáil
Kells	Mike Bray	Fianna Fáil
Kells	Michael Gallagher	Sinn Féin
Kells	David Gilroy	Independent
Kells	Peter Caffrey	Sinn Féin
Laytown–Bettystown	Sharon Tolan	Fine Gael
Laytown–Bettystown	Paddy Meade	Fine Gael
Laytown–Bettystown	Geraldine Keogan	Independent
Laytown–Bettystown	Stephen McKee	Fianna Fáil
Laytown–Bettystown	Wayne Harding	Fianna Fáil
Laytown–Bettystown	Maria White	Sinn Féin
Laytown–Bettystown	Carol Lennon	Independent
Navan	Eddie Fennessy	Sinn Féin
Navan	Emer Tóibín	Aontú
Navan	Francis Deane	Independent
Navan	Pádraig Fitzsimons	Fianna Fáil
Navan	Linda Nelson Murray (Note: Replaced during term, see table below for details.)	Fine Gael
Navan	Alan Lawes	Independent
Navan	Yemi Adenuga	Fine Gael
Ratoath	Gillian Toole	Independent
Ratoath	Maria Murphy	Fine Gael
Ratoath	Brian Fitzgerald	Independent
Ratoath	Caroline O'Reilly	Fianna Fáil
Ratoath	Nick Killian	Independent
Ratoath	Gerry O'Connor	Fine Gael
Ratoath	Fionnan Blake	Sinn Féin
Trim	Noel French	Independent
Trim	Joe Fox	Fine Gael
Trim	Aisling Dempsey	Fianna Fáil
Trim	Dave Boyne	Aontú
Trim	Padraig Coffey	Fianna Fáil
Trim	Ronan Moore	Social Democrats

==== Co-options ====
Party	Outgoing	LEA	Reason	Date	Co-optee
Independent	Gillian Toole	Ratoath	Elected to 34th Dáil at the 2024 general election	18 December 2024	Yvonne Everand
Fianna Fáil	Aisling Dempsey	Trim	Elected to 34th Dáil at the 2024 general election	18 December 2024	Paul O'Rourke
Fine Gael	Linda Nelson Murray	Navan	Elected to 27th Seanad at the 2025 Seanad election	30 January 2025	John Duffy
