= Shane Cassells =

Irish politician (born 1978)

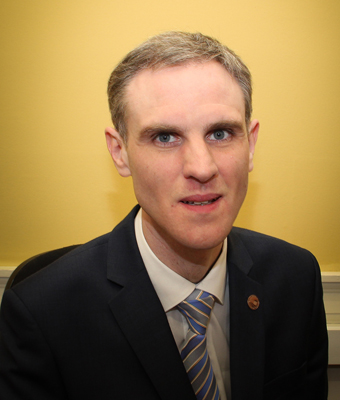
- Cassells in 2016

Senator
- In office 29 June 2020 – 31 January 2025
- Constituency: Labour Panel

Teachta Dála
- In office February 2016 – February 2020
- Constituency: Meath West

Personal details
- Born: 6 April 1978 (age 48) Navan, County Meath, Ireland
- Party: Fianna Fáil
- Spouse: Fiona Healy
- Children: 3
- Education: Griffith College Dublin

Shane Cassells (born 6 April 1978) is an Irish Fianna Fáil politician who served as a Senator for the Labour Panel from April 2020 to January 2025. He previously served as a Teachta Dála (TD) for the Meath West constituency from 2016 to 2020.

Before being elected as a TD, Cassells worked for the Fingal Independent as a sports journalist, and with publishing house Devlin Media. He is a nephew of footballer Joe Cassells, and of Peter Cassells, former head of the Irish Congress of Trade Unions.

Cassells was first elected to Navan Town Council in 1999, and was a member of Meath County Council from 2004 to 2016, serving as Mayor of Navan twice. He contested the 2005 Meath by-election for Fianna Fáil but was not elected. He contested the 2011 Irish general election in the Meath West constituency, but again was not elected.

He was elected on his third attempt at the 2016 general election, and his seat was considered to be safe, but he lost his seat at the 2020 general election, as his share of first preferences fell from 27.4% to 16.2%.

In April 2020, he was elected to Seanad Éireann as a senator for the Labour Panel.

Cassells is married to Fiona Healy, and they have three children.

He did not contest the 2025 Seanad election.

Dáil	Election	Deputy (Party)	Deputy (Party)	Deputy (Party)
30th	2007	Johnny Brady (FF)	Noel Dempsey (FF)	Damien English (FG)
31st	2011	Peadar Tóibín (Note: Left Sinn Féin 15 November 2018; formed Aontú 28 January 2019.) (SF)	Ray Butler (FG)	Damien English (FG)
32nd	2016	Peadar Tóibín (SF)	Shane Cassells (FF)	Damien English (FG)
33rd	2020	Peadar Tóibín (Aon)	Johnny Guirke (SF)	Damien English (FG)
34th	2024	Peadar Tóibín (Aon)	Johnny Guirke (SF)	Aisling Dempsey (FF)
