= Gerry McEntee =

Irish Gaelic footballer

Personal information
- Native name: Gearóid Mac an tSaoi (Irish)
- Born: 19 October 1955 (age 71) Nobber, County Meath, Ireland

Sport
- Sport: Gaelic football
- Position: Midfield
College
- Years: College
- 1970s: UCD
Inter-county
- Years: County
- 1975–?: Meath
Inter-county titles
- Leinster titles: 5
- All-Irelands: 2
- All Stars: 1

Gerry McEntee (born 19 October 1955) is an Irish former Gaelic footballer who played for the Meath county team. He played club football for Nobber GFC and Summerhill.

== Career ==
During his playing career he helped his local club Nobber to rise from Junior "B" to the top level, the Meath Senior Football Championship. In 1990 he transferred from Nobber to Summerhill and played in that year's drawn Meath Senior Football final against Navan O'Mahony's. A wrist injury sustained in the match kept McEntee out of the replay, which O'Mahony's won. He experienced success while playing inter-county football during the 1980s and early 1990s on the Meath teams managed by Seán Boylan, for whom he usually played at midfield. He won two All-Ireland Senior Football Championships in 1987 and 1988, as well as five Leinster Senior Football Championships, two National Football Leagues and a Centenary Cup Medal. He also captained UCD to a Sigerson Cup title in 1978.

McEntee was sent off in the 1988 All-Ireland Senior Football Championship Final replay. He struck Niall Cahalane and was dismissed in the seventh minute of the game.

McEntee managed Dublin club St Brigid's to their first and second Dublin Senior Football Championship in 2003 and again in 2011, as well as their first Leinster Senior Club Football Championship in 2003. He also managed St Brigid's's minor football team to the Minor and Leinster "A" titles in 2007, with the team narrowly missing out on winning the 2008 "A" title after losing the final to Na Fianna by one point after a replay. He also managed the 2008 Dublin minor football team.

McEntee is a qualified surgeon by profession, practising as the hepatobiliary and pancreatic consultant in Dublin's Mater Hospital, and being a former sportsman, also has an interest in groin injuries sustained while playing sport. A member of both the International Hepatobiliary and Pancreatic Association and the Association of Surgeons of Great Britain and Ireland, he operates from Clinic 5 of the hospital's Whitty Building, and from Suite 10 on 69 Eccles Street (the latter for private patients).

McEntee is the brother of Shane McEntee, the deceased Fine Gael TD for Meath. His niece, Helen, has held various ministries in the Irish government, among them Justice, Education, Foreign Affairs and Defence.

McEntee won 2 National Cross Country Championships, 3 Junior Championships and Gold medals in the 100m, 400m and 800m as well as finishing numerous Ultra-Marathons. His fastest time ever recorded for running a mile was 4 minutes and 12 seconds.

Sporting positions
Preceded by ?	Dublin Minor Football Manager; 2008–?	Succeeded by ?
