= 2019 Meath County Council election =

Part of the 2019 Irish local elections

- 24 May 2019

All 40 seats on Meath County Council 21 seats needed for a majority
	First party	Second party	Third party
Party	Fine Gael	Fianna Fáil	Sinn Féin
Seats won	12	12	3
Seat change	▼1	▲2	▼5
	Fourth party	Fifth party	Sixth party
Party	Labour	Social Democrats	Aontú
Seats won	1	1	1
Seat change	▲1	▲1	▲1
	Seventh party
Party	Independent
Seats won	10
Seat change	▲1
- Results by local electoral area

An election to all 40 seats on Meath County Council was held on 24 May 2019 as part of the 2019 Irish local elections. County Meath was divided into 6 local electoral areas (LEAs) to elect councillors for a five-year term of office on the electoral system of proportional representation by means of the single transferable vote (PR-STV).

== Boundary review ==
Following the recommendations of the 2018 LEA boundary review committee, the LEAs used at the 2014 Meath County Council election were adjusted to reflect population changes revealed by the 2016 census. The boundary committee recommended that Navan be designated a borough district. This was implemented in the initial statutory instrument, but was reversed as being contrary to Local Government Act 2001.

== Overview ==
Fine Gael lost 1 seat but remained the largest party with 12 seats but with an increased vote share. Fianna Fáil gained 2 seats to return with 12 seats also but their vote share reduced compared to 2014. Sinn Féin lost 5 seats and was reduced to having representation solely in Ashbourne, Kells and Navan. One of the Sinn Féin losses in Navan was to Emer Tóibín of Aontú, a sister of Peadar Tóibín TD. Through Annie Hoey, Labour regained a seat on the council in Laytown–Bettystown, and in Trim Ronan Moore won a seat for the Social Democrats. The number of Independent councillors increased from 9 to 10.

Sharon Keogan was elected in both the Ashbourne LEA and the Laytown–Bettystown LEA, becoming the first woman in Ireland elected to two electoral areas. She initially objected to being required to choose one of two seats, but later chose Laytown–Bettystown.

== Results by party ==
Party	Seats	±	1st pref	FPv%	±%
Fine Gael	12	▼1	20,549	29.58	▲6.76
Fianna Fáil	12	▲2	17,560	25.28	▼2.40
Sinn Féin	3	▼5	6,845	9.85	▼8.32
Aontú	1	▲1	3,361	4.84	New
Labour	1	▲1	1,710	2.46	▼2.68
Social Democrats	1	▲1	1,533	2.21	New
Green	0	Steady	614	0.88	▲0.63
Workers' Party	0	Steady	330	0.48	▲0.11
Direct Democracy	0	Steady	241	0.35	▼0.05
People Before Profit	0	Steady	164	0.24	▼0.29
Independent	10	▲1	16,552	23.83	▼0.77
Total	40	Steady	69,459	100.00	

== Results by local electoral area ==
*: Outgoing councillor elected in 2014.
†: Outgoing councillor coopted subsequent to the 2014 election.

=== Ashbourne ===
Ashbourne: 6 seats
Party	Candidate	FPv%	Count								
Party	Candidate	FPv%	1	2	3	4	5	6	7	8	9
Independent	Joe Bonner	21.66%	2,170								
Fine Gael	Alan Tobin	15.62%	1,565								
Independent	Sharon Keogan (Note: See change below.)	11.78%	1,180	1,269	1,277	1,292	1,306	1,395	1,415	1,543	
Fine Gael	Suzanne Jamal	11.73%	1,175	1,239	1,258	1,328	1,336	1,479			
Fianna Fáil	Conor Tormey	8.15%	817	1,019	1,060	1,132	1,151	1,167	1,176	1,256	1,357
Fianna Fáil	Lisa Mellor	7.20%	721	738	740	790	795	889	896	955	1,005
Aontú	Joseph Tuite	5.22%	523	562	566	583	590	613	617		
Sinn Féin	Darren O'Rourke	5.00%	501	573	581	592	836	847	848	950	1,148
Social Democrats	Paul Nolan	4.00%	401	546	569	574	611	621	627	668	
Fine Gael	John Stillman	3.88%	389	414	430	435	439				
Sinn Féin	Aisling O'Neill	3.10%	311	378	387	389					
Fianna Fáil	Sarah-Jane Reilly	2.65%	266	284	287						
Electorate: 21,081 Valid: 10,019 Spoilt: 196 Quota: 1,432 Turnout: 10,215

=== Kells ===
Kells: 7 seats
Party	Candidate	FPv%	Count							
Party	Candidate	FPv%	1	2	3	4	5	6	7	8
Fianna Fáil	Seán Drew	14.06%	1,996							
Fine Gael	Sarah Reilly	13.85%	1,966							
Sinn Féin	Johnny Guirke	11.82%	1,678	1,685	1,693	1,724	1,748	1,796		
Fine Gael	Eugene Cassidy	9.95%	1,413	1,421	1,463	1,470	1,514	1,547	1,569	1,792
Independent	David Gilroy	7.87%	1,118	1,122	1,133	1,171	1,234	1,340	1,357	1,493
Fianna Fáil	Paul McCabe	7.46%	1,059	1,109	1,125	1,141	1,195	1,251	1,353	1,546
Fianna Fáil	Mike Bray	7.18%	1,020	1,070	1,088	1,096	1,132	1,178	1,384	1,458
Sinn Féin	Michael Gallagher	7.02%	997	1,013	1,019	1,071	1,120	1,216	1,235	
Fine Gael	Peter Farrelly	6.83%	970	1,000	1,061	1,083	1,136	1,177	1,347	1,410
Fianna Fáil	Oliver Fox	4.92%	698	711	716	716	727	761		
Aontú	Peter Devin	4.03%	572	580	586	609	648			
Labour	Aaron Byrne	2.68%	380	402	414	490				
Workers' Party	Séamus McDonagh	2.32%	330	343	349					
Electorate: 26,262 Valid: 14,197 Spoilt: 250 Quota: 1,775 Turnout: 14,447

=== Laytown–Bettystown ===
Laytown–Bettystown: 7 seats
Party	Candidate	FPv%	Count										
Party	Candidate	FPv%	1	2	3	4	5	6	7	8	9	10	11
Independent	Sharon Keogan	17.80%	2,039										
Fine Gael	Sharon Tolan	15.49%	1,774										
Fine Gael	Paddy Meade	12.71%	1,455										
Fianna Fáil	Wayne Harding	10.44%	1,196	1,228	1,236	1,240	1,251	1,257	1,265	1,270	1,287	1,301	1,451
Labour	Annie Hoey	9.54%	1,093	1,172	1,268	1,279	1,282	1,294	1,324	1,397	1,435		
Fianna Fáil	Stephen McKee	8.93%	1,023	1,264	1,296	1,299	1,300	1,311	1,314	1,319	1,358	1,413	1,471
Fianna Fáil	Tom Behan	7.52%	861	892	970	971	972	975	983	1,013	1,025	1,123	1,164
Sinn Féin	Eimear Ferguson	5.03%	576	633	667	668	669	776	816	846	915	971	1,038
Aontú	Peter Whelan	3.29%	377	403	409	416	420	430	440	446	474	529	
Independent	Tom Kelly	2.40%	275	322	365	376	377	382	395	407	440		
Direct Democracy	Anthony Connor	2.10%	241	270	274	280	280	293	315	347			
Social Democrats	Rob Corr	1.44%	165	177	198	200	200	202	232				
People Before Profit	William Lacey	1.43%	164	178	192	196	196	199					
Sinn Féin	Fergal O'Byrne	1.41%	162	187	190	192	193						
Independent	Patrick Smith	0.45%	51	65	68								
Electorate: 25,236 Valid: 11,452 Spoilt: 201 Quota: 1,432 Turnout: 11,653

=== Navan ===
Navan: 7 seats
Party	Candidate	FPv%	Count										
Party	Candidate	FPv%	1	2	3	4	5	6	7	8	9	10	11
Fianna Fáil	Tommy Reilly	12.79%	1,330										
Aontú	Emer Tóibín	12.37%	1,286	1,289	1,306								
Independent	Francis Deane	11.11%	1,155	1,161	1,173	1,187	1,250	1,273	1,303				
Sinn Féin	Eddie Fennessy	9.51%	989	990	999	1,002	1,019	1,029	1,044	1,095	1,433		
Fianna Fáil	Padraig Fitzsimons	9.42%	979	987	989	1,032	1,058	1,122	1,139	1,185	1,220	1,238	1,316
Independent	Alan Lawes	8.76%	911	912	924	925	932	974	978	1,034	1,087	1,141	1,214
Fine Gael	Yemi Adenuga	6.16%	640	641	649	665	684	707	781	806	867	881	1,225
Green	Séamus McMenamin	5.91%	614	615	670	686	696	707	723	761	803	839	942
Sinn Féin	Sinéad Burke	5.41%	562	563	571	575	594	602	609	651			
Fine Gael	Ross Kelly	5.30%	551	552	560	573	590	628	714	756	794	805	
Independent	Wayne Forde	3.06%	318	319	324	330	353	361	370				
Fine Gael	Karen Byrne	2.58%	268	268	270	276	285	291					
Independent	Stephen Ball	2.23%	232	233	239	245							
Fianna Fáil	Jenny McHugh	2.18%	227	229	230	266	269						
Fianna Fáil	Madeleine Thornton	1.70%	177	180	182								
Social Democrats	Amy McGrath	1.52%	158	158									
Electorate: 23,167 Valid: 10,397 Spoilt: 195 Quota: 1,300 Turnout: 10,592

=== Ratoath ===
Ratoath: 7 seats
Party	Candidate	FPv%	Count						
Party	Candidate	FPv%	1	2	3	4	5	6	7
Fianna Fáil	Damien O'Reilly	17.52%	2,198						
Independent	Gillian Toole	15.72%	1,972						
Independent	Brian Fitzgerald	14.43%	1,810						
Independent	Nick Killian	12.35%	1,549	1,598					
Fine Gael	Gerry O'Connor	9.76%	1,224	1,259	1,339	1,384	1,408	1,470	1,542
Fine Gael	Maria Murphy	9.28%	1,164	1,366	1,386	1,430	1,469	1,635	
Independent	Seán Henry	5.48%	688	805	832	878	947	970	1,118
Fianna Fáil	Deirdre Geraghty-Smith	4.62%	579	744	831	873	940	1,071	1,304
Independent	Fergus O'Riordan	3.83%	481	496	594	609	710	790	
Fine Gael	Bee Flanagan	3.52%	442	456	517	548	567		
Sinn Féin	Maria Uí Ruairc	3.48%	437	469	499	517	567		
Electorate: 25,803 Valid: 12,544 Spoilt: 221 Quota: 1,569 Turnout: 12,765

=== Trim ===
Trim: 6 seats
Party	Candidate	FPv%	Count					
Party	Candidate	FPv%	1	2	3	4	5	6
Fine Gael	Noel French	27.23%	2,954					
Fine Gael	Joe Fox	14.47%	1,570					
Fianna Fáil	Aisling Dempsey	10.25%	1,112	1,385	1,447	1,567		
Fine Gael	Niamh Souhan	9.48%	1,029	1,271	1,321	1,397	1,436	1,508
Fianna Fáil	Vera Kelly	8.02%	870	931	948	1,085	1,148	1,193
Social Democrats	Ronan Moore	7.46%	809	996	1,050	1,064	1,143	1,402
Sinn Féin	Caroline Lynch	5.82%	632	776	799	817	923	
Independent	Trevor Golden	5.56%	603	845	886	923	1,138	1,332
Aontú	Des Doran	5.56%	603	703	719	725		
Fianna Fáil	Sinéad Geraghty	3.97%	431	470	494			
Labour	Tracy McElhinney	2.18%	237	352				
Electorate: 25,574 Valid: 10,850 Spoilt: 222 Quota: 1,551 Turnout: 11,072

== Results by gender ==
2019 Meath County Council election Candidates by gender
Gender	Number of candidates	% of candidates	Elected councillors	% of councillors
Men	50	64.1%	27	67.5%
Women	28	35.9%	13	32.5%
TOTAL	78		40	

== Changes after 2019 ==
=== Co-options ===
Party	Outgoing	LEA	Reason	Date	Co-optee
Independent	Sharon Keogan	Ashbourne	Elected for two areas; chose to sit for Laytown–Bettystown	June 2019	Amanda Smith
Sinn Féin	Darren O'Rourke	Ashbourne	Elected to the 33rd Dáil for Meath East at the 2020 general election	February 2020	Aisling Ó Néill
Sinn Féin	Johnny Guirke	Kells	Elected to the 33rd Dáil for Meath West at the 2020 general election	February 2020	Michael Gallagher
Independent	Sharon Keogan	Laytown–Bettystown	Elected to the 26th Seanad on the Industrial and Commercial Panel at the 2020 Seanad election	June 2020	Geraldine Keogan
Labour	Annie Hoey	Laytown–Bettystown	Elected to the 26th Seanad on the Agricultural Panel at the 2020 Seanad election	8 June 2020	Elaine McGinty
Sinn Féin	Aisling Ó Néil	Ashbourne	Work Commitments	June 2023	Helen Meyer
Fianna Fáil	Damien O'Reilly	Ratoath	Death of councillor	September 2023	Caroline O’Reilly

=== Changes in affiliation ===
Name	LEA	Elected as	New affiliation	Date
Noel French	Trim	Fine Gael	Independent	September 2023
Joe Bonner	Ashbourne	Independent	Independent Ireland	May 2024

== Sources ==
- "Meath County Council - Local Election candidates". RTÉ. 13 May 2019. Archived from the original on 13 September 2020.
- "Meath Local Election Results 2019". Meath County Council.
- "Local Elections 2019: Results, Transfer of Votes and Statistics" (PDF). Department of Housing, Planning and Local Government. Archived from the original (PDF) on 10 June 2020.
