= Johnny Guirke =

Irish politician

Johnny Guirke TD
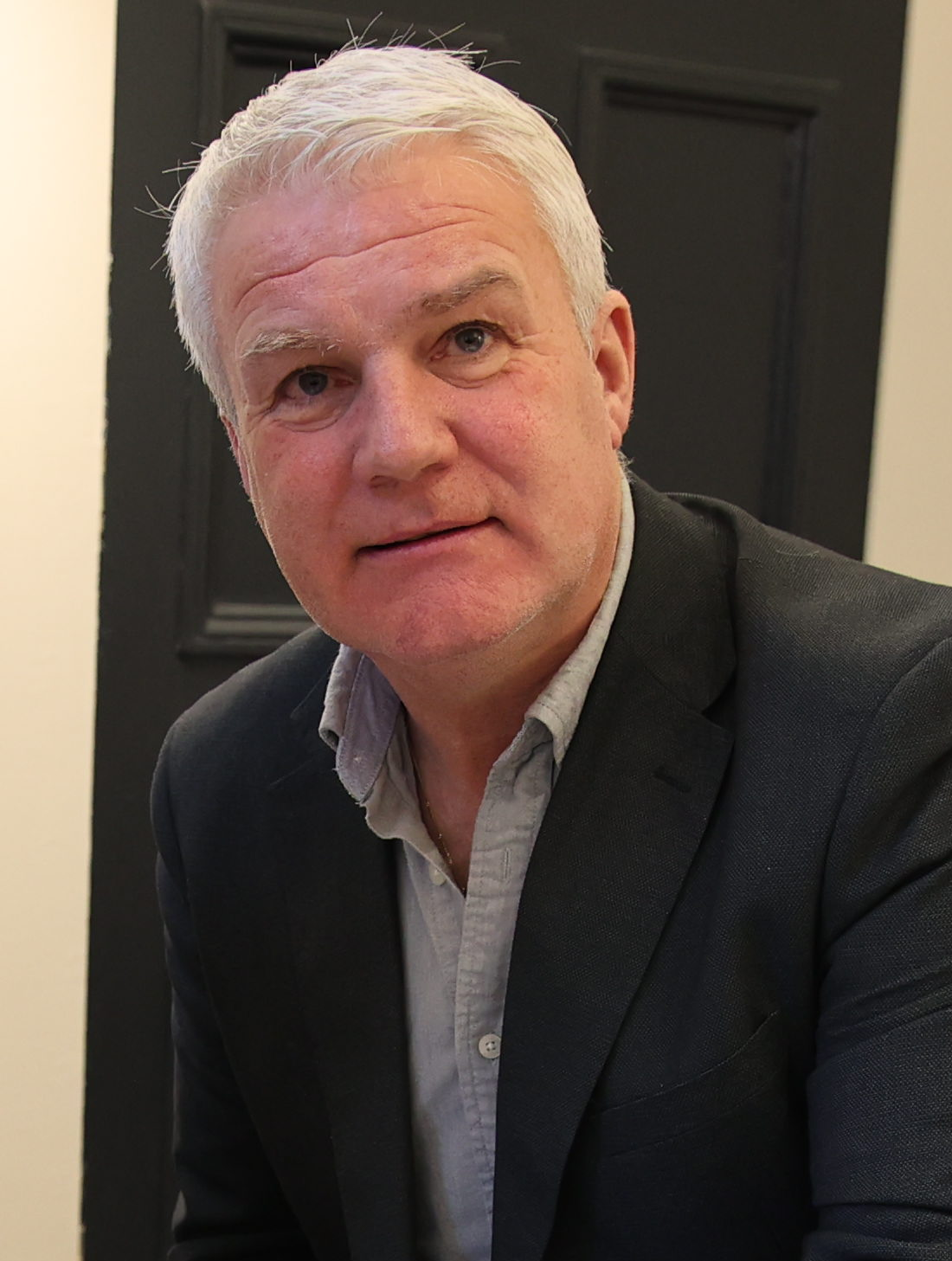
- Guirke in 2024

Teachta Dála
- Incumbent
- Assumed office February 2020
- Constituency: Meath West

Personal details
- Born: 1969–1973 Navan, County Meath, Ireland
- Party: Sinn Féin
- Spouse: Mary Murphy
- Children: 4

Johnny Guirke is an Irish Sinn Féin politician who has been a Teachta Dála (TD) for the Meath West constituency since the 2020 general election.

== Political career ==
Guirke was a member of Meath County Council for the Kells local electoral area from 2014 to 2020, first elected in 2014 and re-elected again in 2019.

At the 2020 Irish general election, Guirke was elected as a TD for Meath West, topping the poll.

In August 2022 the Irish Independent reported that Guirke failed to register one of his rental properties with the Residential Tenancies Board. He was warned by Sinn Féin that any further lapses in registration of rental properties “will result in disciplinary action from the party”.

== Personal life ==
Guirke moved to Boston in 1988, where he worked in the construction industry for 18 years, before moving back to Meath.

Guirke met his wife Mary while living in Boston, and the couple have four children.

Dáil	Election	Deputy (Party)	Deputy (Party)	Deputy (Party)
30th	2007	Johnny Brady (FF)	Noel Dempsey (FF)	Damien English (FG)
31st	2011	Peadar Tóibín (Note: Left Sinn Féin 15 November 2018; formed Aontú 28 January 2019.) (SF)	Ray Butler (FG)	Damien English (FG)
32nd	2016	Peadar Tóibín (SF)	Shane Cassells (FF)	Damien English (FG)
33rd	2020	Peadar Tóibín (Aon)	Johnny Guirke (SF)	Damien English (FG)
34th	2024	Peadar Tóibín (Aon)	Johnny Guirke (SF)	Aisling Dempsey (FF)
