= Ray Butler =

Ray Butler may refer to:

- Ray Butler (American football) (born 1956), retired American football wide receiver
- Ray Butler (politician) (born 1965), Irish Fine Gael politician

== See also ==
- Butler (surname)
