= Ronan Moore =

Irish politician, author and school teacher

Meath County Councillor
- Incumbent
- Assumed office May 2019
- Constituency: Trim

Personal details
- Born: 1978 or 1979 (age 46–47)
- Party: Social Democrats
- Education: NUI Galway; Dublin Institute of Technology

Ronan Moore is an Irish politician, secondary school teacher, and author who has served as a member of Meath County Council since 2019. Representing the Social Democrats in the Trim local electoral area, he was first elected in the 2019 local elections and successfully retained his seat in 2024. He has served as Cathaoirleach of the Trim Municipal District Council since 2024.

His books have a particular focus on the quirks of Irish culture, and Irish mythology.

== Early life ==
Moore grew up in Summerhill and in Trim, County Meath.

He received a degree in English and History from NUI Galway followed by a Masters in Sustainable Development from Dublin Institute of Technology.

== Career ==
He has worked with Trócaire in Nigeria. As of 2020, he works as a secondary school English and history teacher at St Patrick's Classical School in Navan.

== Writing ==
In 2015 Moore published a book, Irishology, which discusses some of the strange quirks of Irish culture. This would become the first of a trilogy of similar books, being followed in 2016 by Irishography, which discussed parts of Ireland's geography, and by Irishisms in 2017.

In 2020 Moore published "Young Fionn", a retelling of the Boyhood Deeds of Fionn aimed at a young audience; this was published by Gill Books and illustrated by Alexandra Colombo.

== Politics ==
At the 2019 Meath County Council election, Moore won a seat for the Social Democrats in the Trim local electoral area. In 2020 he was elected as Cathaoirleach of Trim Municipal District Council following its second AGM. At the 2020 general election he stood in the Meath West constituency, but was not elected. He was re-elected at the 2024 Meath County Council election. He also stood unsuccessfully at the 2024 general election for Meath West. He has served as the Cathaoirleach of Trim Municipal District since 2024, and was re-elected in 2025.

Moore, along with other councilors, opposed a motion to remove the books To Kill a Mockingbird and Of Mice and Men from the school curriculum due to racist language. He defended the books by saying they were important in teaching students about the history of racism and racial injustice.

== Personal life ==
As of 2015, he lives in Trim with his wife and children. He is a board member of the Trim Family Resource Centre.

== Bibliography ==
- Irishology. Gill Books. October 2015. ISBN 9780717168200.
- Irishography. Gill Books. October 2016. ISBN 9780717171217.
- Irishisms. Gill Books. October 2017. ISBN 9780717175512.
- Young Fionn: Small Kid, Big Legend. Gill Books. February 2020. ISBN 9780717185863.
- Fionn and the Fianna: Small Kid, Big Legend. Gill Books. April 2021. ISBN 9780717191000.
