= Kells Round Tower =

Round tower in Kells, County Meath

- Cloigtheach Cheanannais
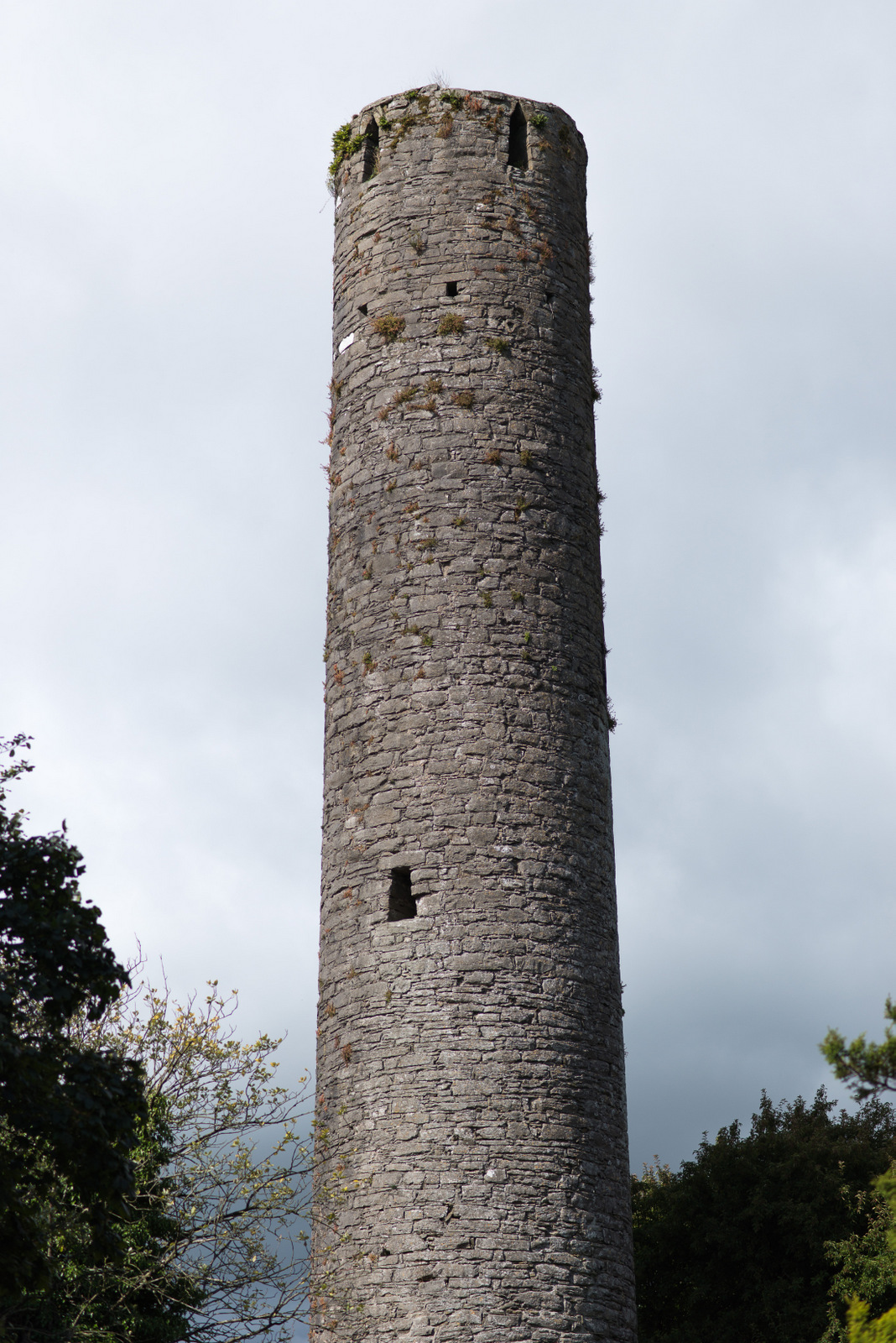
- Round tower of Kells

- Location within Ireland

Religion
- Affiliation: Pre-Reformation Catholic

Location
- Location: Farrell Street, Kells, County Meath, Ireland
- Interactive map of Kells Round Tower
- Coordinates: 53.727302°N 6.880161°W

Architecture
- Style: Irish round tower
- Groundbreaking: 10th century

Specifications
- Height (max): 26 m (85 ft)
- Materials: sandstone, limestone

Kells Round Tower is a round tower in Kells, County Meath in Ireland. The tower, and the high crosses nearby, are National Monuments.

== History ==
Kells was founded as a monastic settlement by Saint Columba c. 550 on land that had been gifted to him by the King of Tara - Diarmait mac Cerbaill. Columba was exiled after the Battle of Cúl Dreimhne (AD 561). The Abbey of Kells was re-founded in the early 9th century by monks from Iona. The high crosses were erected in the 9th/10th century and the round tower in the 10th century.

The Annals of Ulster state 1076.3 Murchadh son of Flann ua Mael Sechlainn, king of Temair for three nights, was killed in the bell-tower of Cenannas by the grandson of Maelán, king of Gailenga. Maelán's grandson was named Amlaibh (anglicized Awley/Olaf a Norse forename). Amlaib mac Maolain, was the son of Laidgnen/Laidcnen Mac Maolain (Lynan McMoylan), lord of the Luighne, recorded p139 in the charters section of the "Book of Kells", and grandson of Maelan, lord of all north Luighne and Gaileanga d.1017.

Awley's forename came as a result of Lynan's marriage the daughter of the Got MaelSechlain, Queen Mor, listed with him in the charter section as witness. Annals of Ulster state U1051.4 Laidcnén son of Maelán, king of Gailenga, went with his queen, i.e. the daughter of the Got, to Rome on his pilgrimage and died. Queen Mor was the granddaughter of Maelmaire, daughter of Amlaibh Curran king of the Dublin Vikings. She had married Mael Sechlain Mor. The Annals of Four Masters state M1021.3 Maelmaire, daughter of Amhlaeibh, wife of Maelseachlainn, son of Domhnall, died. Annals of Four Masters state A.D. 1087. Maelseachlainn, son of Conchobhar O'Maelseachlainn, King of Tara, was killed in treachery and guile by Cathal Mac Muiricen and the men of Teffia, at Ardagh of the Bishop Mel.

Like most round towers, it has lost its cap, possibly due to lightning strikes.

== Tower ==
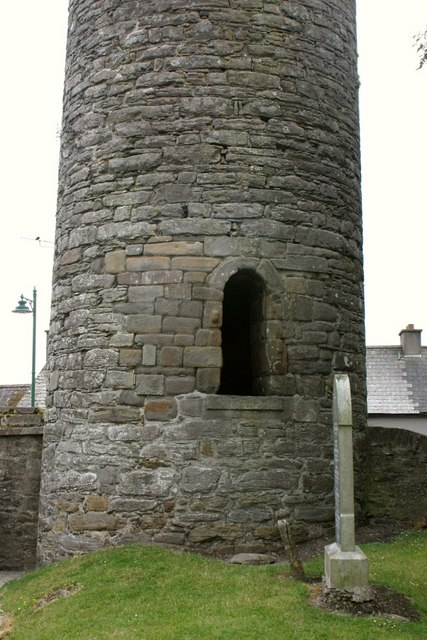
Tower entrance

The tower stands 26 m (85 ft) high. The doorway originally stood about 3.6 m (12 ft) above ground level and was reached by wooden steps or a ladder. Most round towers have four windows on the top level, one for each cardinal direction, but Kells has five, supposedly one facing each road into the town and each town gate.

== The crosses ==
There are five high crosses:

- Cross of St Patrick and St Columba (South Cross): the earliest cross, erected in the 9th century. Carved scenes include Adam and Eve, Cain and Abel, the Three Children in the Furnace and Daniel in the lions' den.
- West Cross (Ruined Cross): Adam and Eve, entry into the Promised Land, Marriage at Cana, Baptism of Jesus and his triumphal entry into Jerusalem. Supposedly the cross was damaged by soldiers of Oliver Cromwell.
- East Cross (Unfinished Cross): incomplete; it gives an insight into how crosses were carved, with the details being added on site.
- Market Cross: 3.35 m (11.0 ft): as well as religious scenes (including David with lyre, the Binding of Isaac and the temptation of Saint Anthony) there is depicted a deer hunt, birds, animals and centaurs.
- North Cross: only the base remains.
High crosses
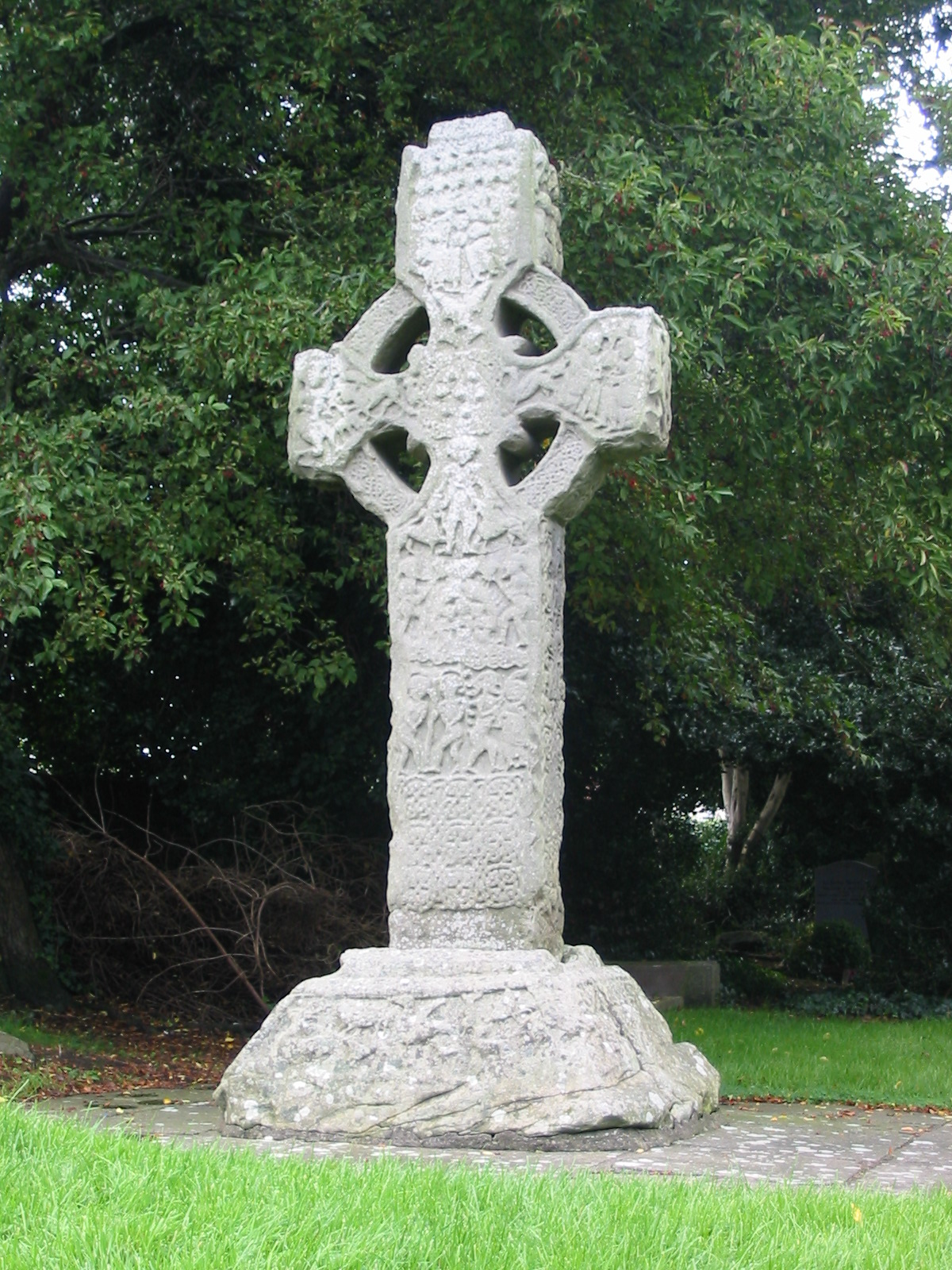
Cross of St Patrick and St Columba

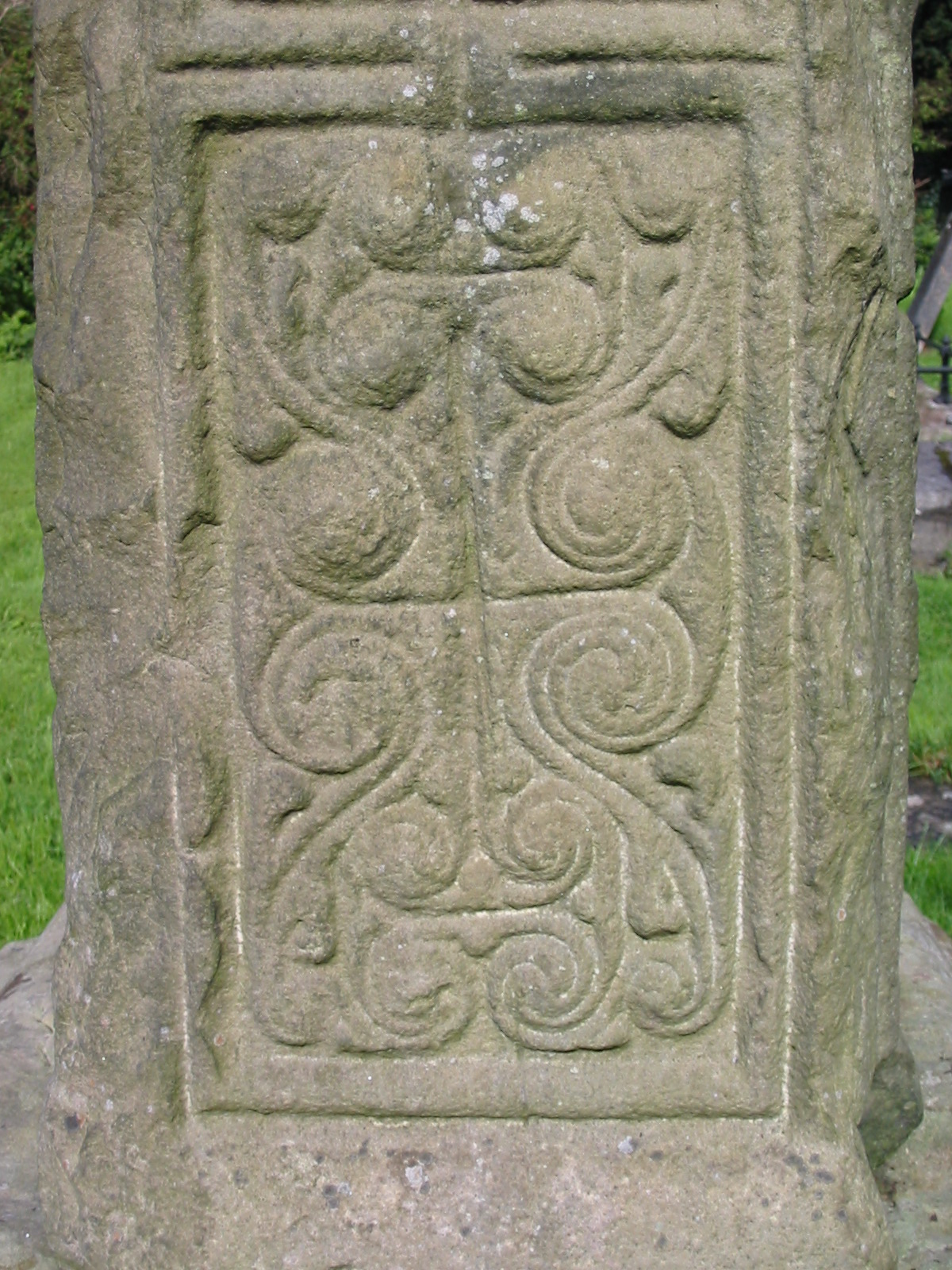
Ruined Cross

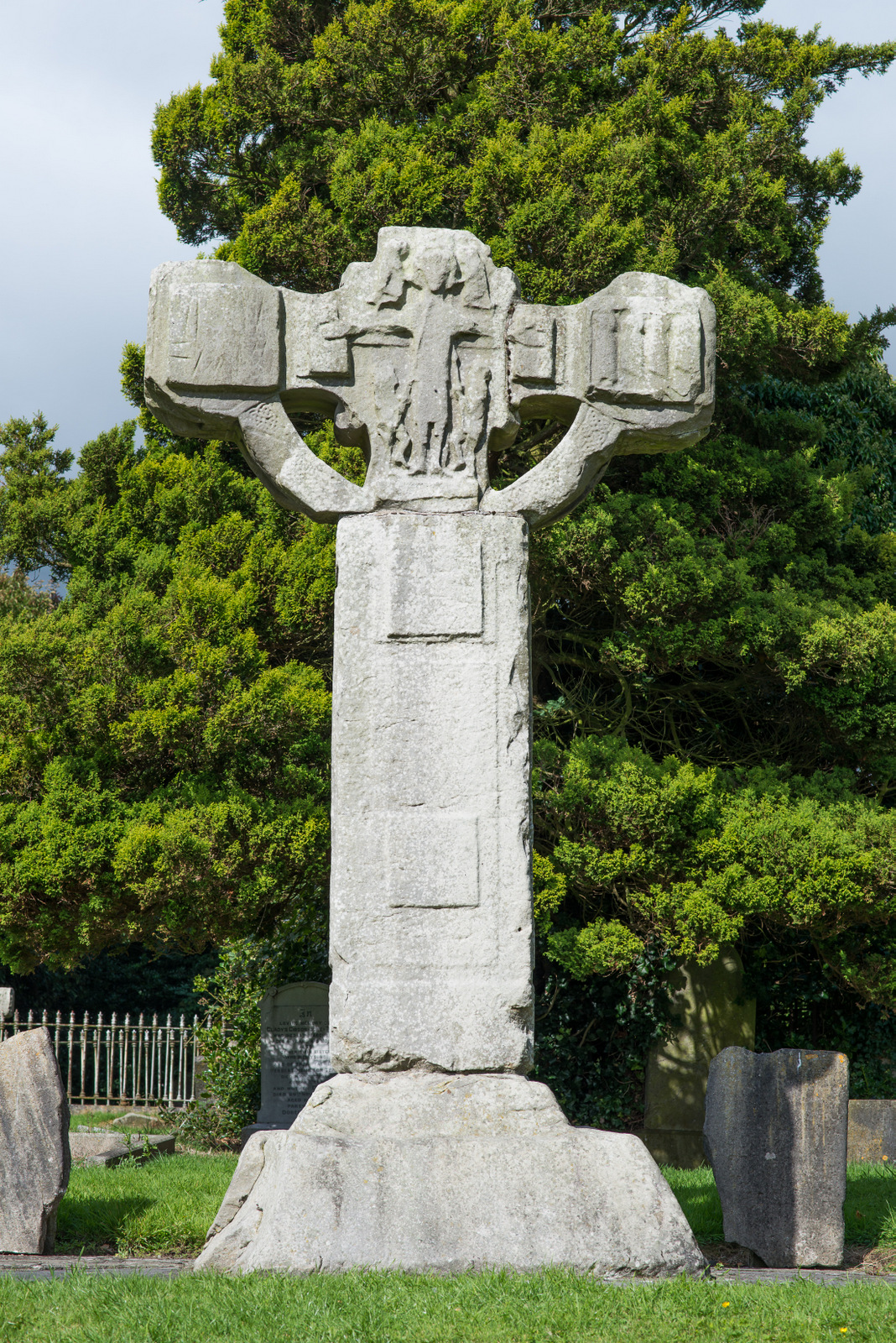
Unfinished Cross

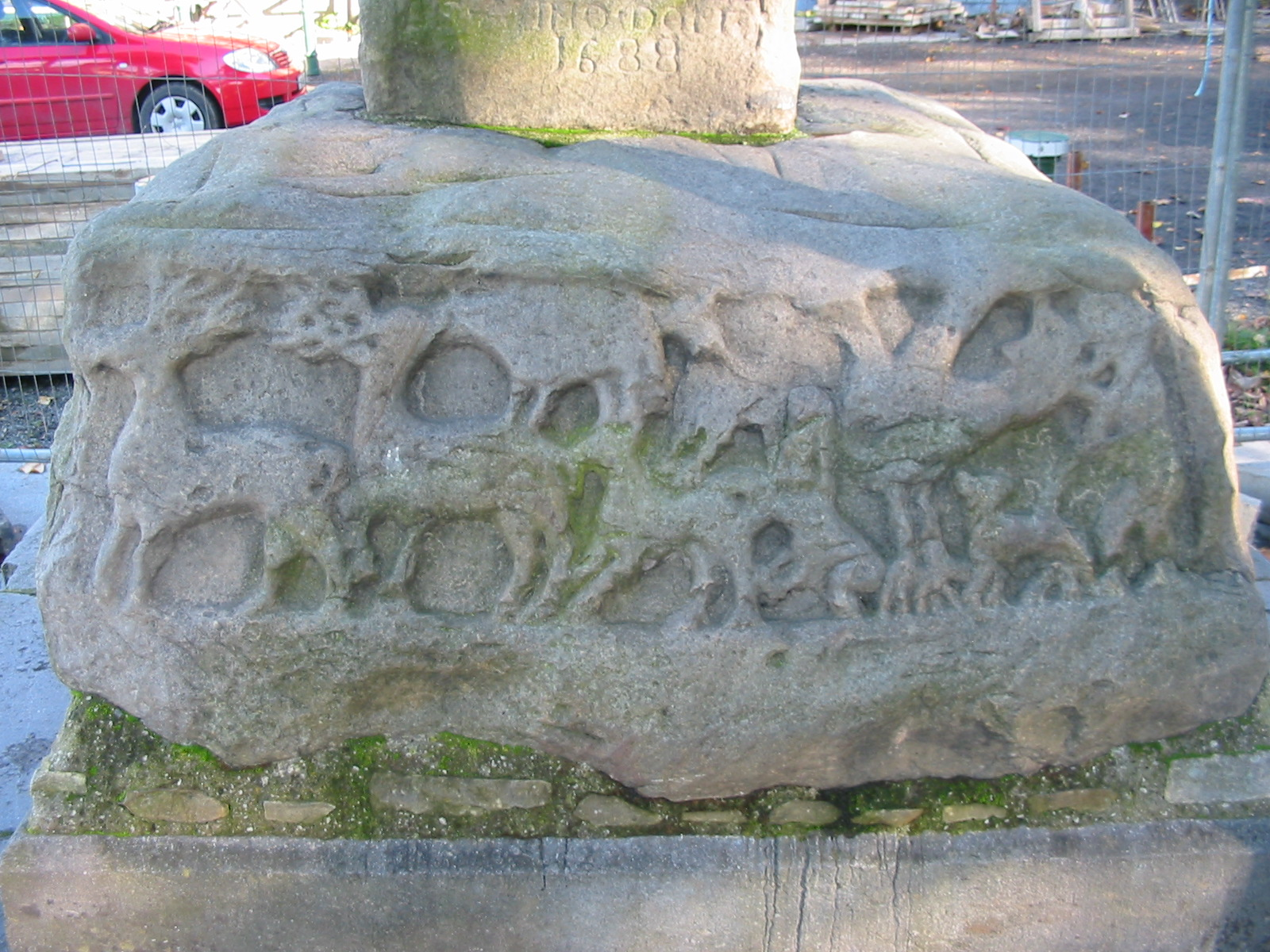
Market Cross, base
