= Baile Ghib =

Village and Gaeltacht in County Meath, Ireland

Baile Ghib Gibbstown
- Community and Gaeltacht area
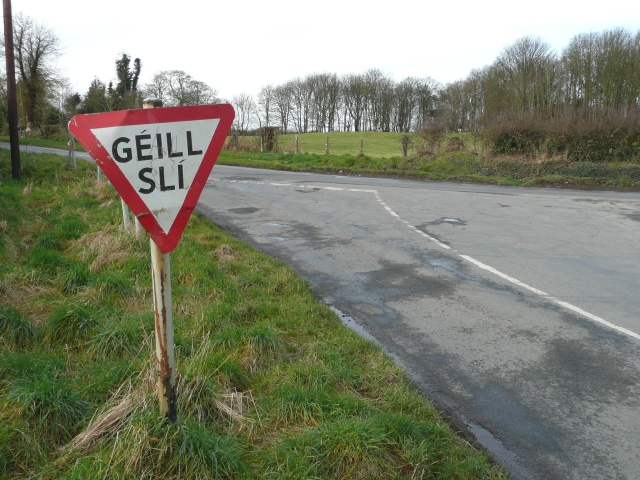
- Irish-language road sign on a road junction in Baile Ghib

- Location within Ireland
- Coordinates: 53°42′36″N 6°45′00″W
- Country: Ireland
- Province: Leinster
- County: County Meath
- Barony: Upper Kells

Population (2016)
  - Total: 142
- Time zone: UTC+0 (WET)
  - Summer (DST): UTC-1 (IST (WEST))
- As a Gaeltacht area, only the Irish language name has official status

Baile Ghib (anglicised as Gibbstown or Gibstown) is a hamlet and Gaeltacht (Irish-speaking area) in County Meath, Ireland. It is about 70 km (40 mi) northwest of Dublin, and a short distance northeast of Navan. The Gaeltacht area, which is centred on the hamlet of Baile Ghib, was established in 1937. Then 52 families were settled on land previously acquired by the Irish Land Commission, followed in 1939 by a further 9 families who settled in Clongill. In all, 373 people moved to the area. The hamlet itself is located within two adjoining townlands, Gibstown and Gibstown Demesne (Irish: Diméin Bhaile Ghib), and is in the eastern part of the historical barony of Upper Kells.

Baile Ghib and the nearby area of Ráth Chairn make up the Meath Gaeltacht. At the 2022 census the settlements of Ráth Chairn and Baile Ghib had a combined population of 420. The Meath Gaeltacht had a population of 1,857 in 2016, representing 1.9% of the total population of Ireland's Gaeltacht. According to the 2016 census, 15.9% of the population of Baile Ghib and Ráth Chairn spoke Irish on a daily basis outside the education system.

== History ==
=== Establishment of the Meath Gaeltacht ===
The Meath Gaeltacht was formed when the Irish Land Commission redistributed parts of the former estates of landlords, and farmers from the Gaeltacht areas of the western seaboard were resettled in County Meath in the 1930s. The migrants were from places such as: West Cork; County Kerry; Connemara in County Galway; County Mayo; and The Rosses in County Donegal. The government's goals were to relieve overcrowding and poverty in such areas, and to spread the Irish language. It was also a social experiment to redress the 17th-century ethnic cleansing of Ireland by Oliver Cromwell's draconian Act for the Settlement of Ireland 1652 (in popular memory "to hell or to Connaught"). Due to the limited size of the Gaeltacht, the difficulty of providing services in Irish made bilingualism necessary.

=== Foundation of the Baile Ghib Gaeltacht ===
The Baile Ghib Gaeltacht was founded in 1937, when Irish-speaking families from the Gaeltachtaí in counties Mayo, Kerry, Cork and Donegal settled in the area. This diversity is reflected in the local road names, including Donegal Road and Mayo Road. Baile Ailin (English: Allenstown) was established nearby at the same time as Baile Ghib, but proved less successful, with most of its inhabitants moving away. Each family received a house, 22 acres, farm animals and farm implements in exchange for land and property in their native county. The new migrants from The Rosses in the west of County Donegal spoke Ulster Irish, which is quite distinct from the other dialects of the Irish language. Baile Ghib was eventually given official Gaeltacht status, along with Ráth Chairn, in 1967.

=== New History of the Baile Ghib Gaeltacht ===
A new history, Ceann Scríbe Baile Ghib - Destination Gibbstown, was published in 2024.
