= Abbey of Kells =

Former monastery in County Meath, Ireland

- Mainistir Cheanannais
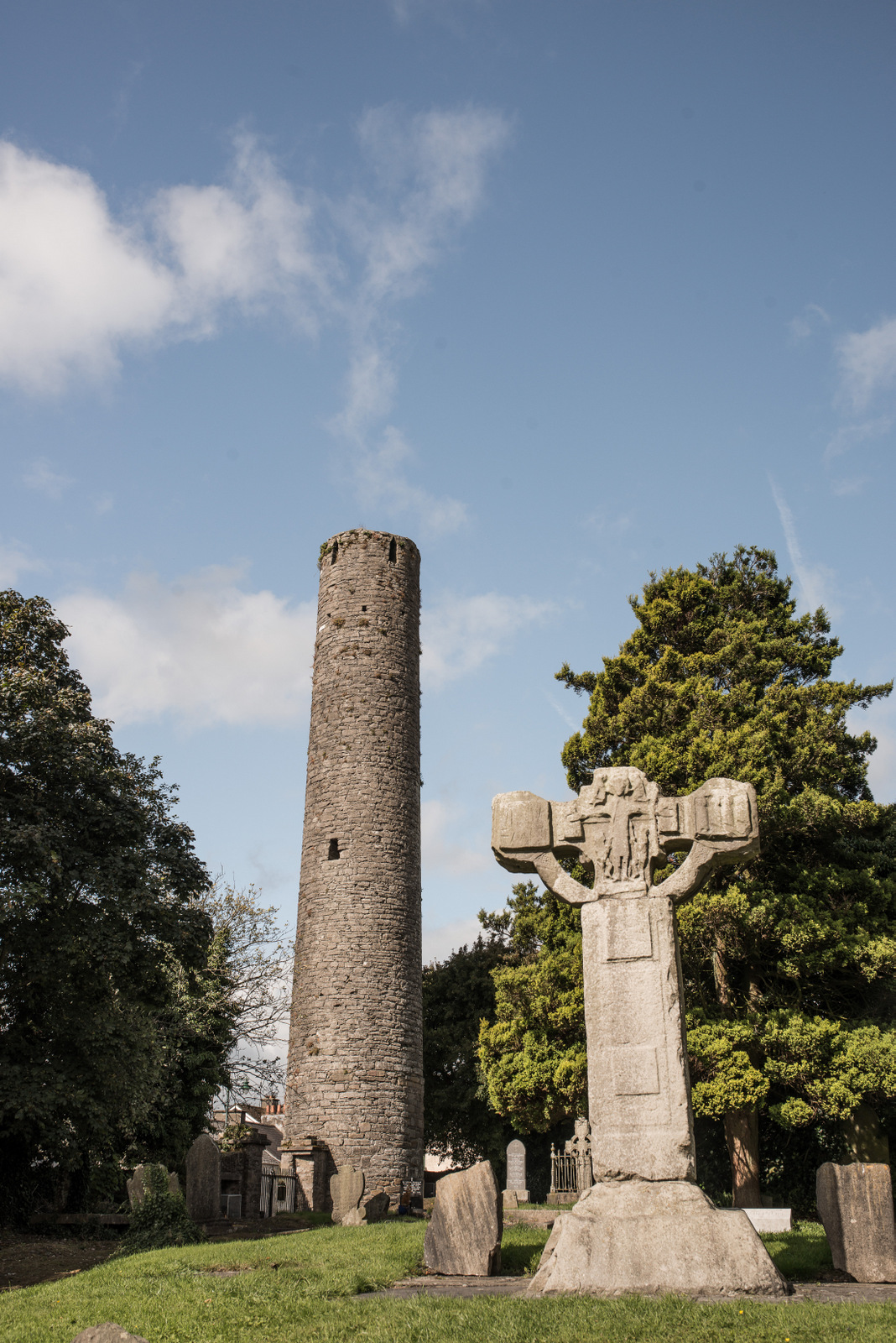
- Round tower at Kells

- Location within Ireland
- Interactive map of Abbey of Kells

Monastery information
- Established: 6th century/early 9th century
- Disestablished: 12th century

People
- Founder: Columba/Cellach of Iona

Site
- Location: Kells, County Meath, Ireland
- Coordinates: 53°43′38″N 6°52′48″W

Designations

National monument of Ireland
- Official name: Kells (round tower & High Crosses)
- Reference no.: 158

The Abbey of Kells (Irish: Mainistir Cheanannais) or Kells Priory is a former monastery in Kells, County Meath, Ireland, 59 kilometres (37 mi) north-west of Dublin. It was founded in the early 9th century, and the Book of Kells was kept there during the later medieval and early modern periods before finally leaving the abbey in the 1650s. Much of the Book of Kells may have been created there, but historians cannot be certain of the exact date and circumstances of its creation.

== History ==
The Abbey of Kells was reportedly founded by St. Columba ca. 554, after High King Diarmuid Mac Caroll of Tara granted the land. The Abbey was refounded from Iona, the building taking from 807 until the consecration of the church in 814. The site was a former Irish hill fort. In 814, Cellach, Abbot of Iona, retired to Kells, but, contrary to what is sometimes claimed, it is clear from the Annals that Iona remained the main Columban house for several decades, despite the danger of Viking raids. Only in 878 were the main relics, with Columba's reliquary shrine specified in the records, moved to Ireland, with Kells becoming the new main Columban house. Though not mentioned, this might well have been when the Book of Kells came to Kells.

=== Book of Kells ===
Among other theories, it is believed that the Book of Kells may have been either started in Iona and finished in Kells or written entirely in the scriptorium at Kells by successive generations of monks.

The Vikings continually raided the abbey during the 10th century and it was repeatedly sacked and pillaged. Despite the constant raids, the monks managed to keep the Book of Kells intact until 1006 when it was stolen from the shrine. A reference in the Annals of Ulster is generally believed to refer the theft of the Book of Kells and it relates that the manuscript was returned after two months without its cover. The force of the removal of the cover probably explains the missing illustrations at the beginning and end of the book.

The book was stored in the abbey for the remainder of the Middle Ages. In the 12th century, details of land charters for the abbey were copied onto blank pages of the Book of Kells as was common practice for the period. This is the earliest confirmed reference to its presence at the abbey. Later in the same century, the monastery was dissolved with the abbey becoming a parish church and the Book of Kells continued to be kept there.

The Book of Kells remained at Kells until the 1650s when Oliver Cromwell's troops were stationed in the town. At that point it was sent to Dublin for safekeeping. In 1661, the Book of Kells was acquired by Trinity College Dublin where it remains.

== Description ==
Today, the monastic site includes a 10th-century round tower that rises around 28 metres (92 ft) from the original street level. It has five windows on the top floor rather than the usual four, overlooking the five roads leading into Kells.

The current church building (Church of Ireland) dates to 1778 and was renovated in 1965. Nearby is St. Columb's House, a 10th-century oratory. There are also a number of 9th- to 10th-century high crosses. Three crosses and a cross base are located on the site itself, whilst the 9th-century "Market Cross" (originally at the abbey's eastern gate) is now located in front of the old courthouse. Legend has it that it was damaged by Cromwellian soldiers and that it was used to hang participants of the 1798 rebellion. The round tower and high crosses are a National Monument of Ireland.
