= Meath West =

Dáil constituency (2007–present)

- Dáil constituency
- Location of Meath West within Ireland
- Interactive map of constituency boundaries since the 2024 general election
- Major settlements: Athboy; Enfield; Navan; Trim

Current constituency
- Created: 2007
- Seats: 3
- TDs: Aisling Dempsey (FF); Johnny Guirke (SF); Peadar Tóibín (Aon)
- Local government areas: County Meath
- EP constituency: Midlands–North-West

Meath West is a parliamentary constituency represented in Dáil Éireann, the lower house of the Irish parliament or Oireachtas. The constituency elects three deputies (Teachtaí Dála, commonly known as TDs) on the system of proportional representation by means of the single transferable vote (PR-STV).

== History and boundaries ==
The constituency was created under the Electoral (Amendment) Act 2005 when the previous 5-seat Meath constituency was divided into two 3-seat constituencies of Meath East and Meath West. It was first used at the 2007 general election to the 30th Dáil. The town of Kells was moved to Meath East at the 2011 general election. The part of County Westmeath in the constituency was moved to Longford–Westmeath at the 2024 general election.

It spans the western portions of County Meath, including the towns of Trim and Navan.

For the 2024 general election, the Electoral (Amendment) Act 2023 defines the constituency as:

"The county of Meath, except the parts thereof which are comprised in the constituencies of Louth and Meath East."

Changes to the Meath West constituency 2007–present
Years	TDs	Boundaries	Notes
2007–2011	3	County Meath, except that part in the constituency of Meath East, and County Westmeath, except that part in the constituency of Longford–Westmeath.	Created from Meath and Westmeath
2011–2020	3	County Meath, except the parts in the constituencies of Louth and Meath East, and County Westmeath, except that part in the constituency of Longford–Westmeath.	Transfer to Meath East of Ceanannas Mór Urban, and of Ceanannas Mór Rural, Maperath and Staholmog in the former Rural District of Kells.
2020–2024	3	County Meath, except the parts in the constituencies of Cavan–Monaghan, Louth and Meath East, and County Westmeath, except that part in the constituency of Longford–Westmeath.	
2024–	3	County Meath, except the parts in the constituencies of Louth and Meath East	Transfer to Longford–Westmeath of Ballinlough, Ballyhealy, Ballynaskeagh, Bracklin, Clonarney, Collinstown, Copperalley, Delvin, Faughalstown, Fore East, Fore West, Hilltown, Kilcumny, Killua, Killulagh, Kilpatrick, Kinturk, Riverdale, Rosmead in the former Rural District of Kells in County Westmeath.

== TDs ==
Teachtaí Dála (TDs) for Meath West 2007–
Key to parties: Aon = Aontú; FF = Fianna Fáil; FG = Fine Gael; SF = Sinn Féin
Dáil	Election	Deputy (Party)	Deputy (Party)	Deputy (Party)
30th	2007	Johnny Brady (FF)	Noel Dempsey (FF)	Damien English (FG)
31st	2011	Peadar Tóibín (Note: Left Sinn Féin 15 November 2018; formed Aontú 28 January 2019.) (SF)	Ray Butler (FG)	Damien English (FG)
32nd	2016	Peadar Tóibín (SF)	Shane Cassells (FF)	Damien English (FG)
33rd	2020	Peadar Tóibín (Aon)	Johnny Guirke (SF)	Damien English (FG)
34th	2024	Peadar Tóibín (Aon)	Johnny Guirke (SF)	Aisling Dempsey (FF)

Note: The columns in this table are used only for presentational purposes, and no significance should be attached to the order of columns. For details of the order in which seats were won at each election, see the detailed results of that election.

== Elections ==
*: Outgoing TD

=== 2024 general election ===
2024 general election: Meath West
Party	Candidate	FPv%	Count				
Party	Candidate	FPv%	1	2	3	4	5
Sinn Féin	Johnny Guirke	22.8	8,604	8,899	9,887		
Aontú	Peadar Tóibín	20.1	7,563	8,038	8,334	10,054	
Fianna Fáil	Aisling Dempsey	17.3	6,535	6,683	7,116	8,454	8,806
Fine Gael	Linda Nelson Murray	16.4	6,164	6,393	6,841	7,823	8,098
Independent	Noel French	10.5	3,969	4,298	5,045		
Social Democrats	Ronan Moore	6.7	2,542	3,244			
Green	Séamus McMenamin	1.5	568				
PBP–Solidarity	Finbar Lynch (Note: Lynch is a member of People Before Profit.)	1.4	505				
Labour	Sandy Gallagher	1.1	420				
Liberty Republic	Ben Gilroy	1.1	416				
The Irish People	Ian McGauley	0.6	216				
Independent	Damien Reilly	0.5	203				
Electorate: 65,148 Valid: 37,705 Spoilt: 230 Quota: 9,427 Turnout: 58.2%

=== 2020 general election ===
2020 general election: Meath West
Party	Candidate	FPv%	Count					
Party	Candidate	FPv%	1	2	3	4	5	6
Sinn Féin	Johnny Guirke	30.5	12,652					
Aontú	Peadar Tóibín	17.6	7,322	8,249	8,616	9,075	9,714	11,410
Fianna Fáil	Shane Cassells	16.2	6,742	6,926	7,117	7,311	7,644	8,224
Fine Gael	Damien English	13.2	5,499	5,604	6,513	6,802	8,699	9,558
Fine Gael	Noel French	7.1	2,952	3,006	3,361	3,534		
Social Democrats	Ronan Moore	5.7	2,376	2,931	3,045	4,141	4,569	
Green	Séamus McMenamin	4.7	1,935	2,224	2,380			
Fine Gael	Sarah Reilly	4.4	1,817	1,897				
Renua	John Malone	0.5	209	290				
Electorate: 67,982 Valid: 41,504 Spoilt: 320 Quota: 10,377 Turnout: 61.5%

=== 2016 general election ===
2016 general election: Meath West
Party	Candidate	FPv%	Count					
Party	Candidate	FPv%	1	2	3	4	5	6
Fianna Fáil	Shane Cassells	27.4	10,585					
Sinn Féin	Peadar Tóibín	24.5	9,442	9,713				
Fine Gael	Damien English	21.0	8,123	8,333	8,376	8,785	8,880	10,371
Fine Gael	Ray Butler	11.5	4,432	4,519	4,552	4,853	4,904	5,841
Independent	Trevor Golden	4.5	1,718	1,844	1,984	2,137	2,616	
Green	Séamus McMenamin	3.7	1,421	1,519	1,587	1,807	2,178	
Direct Democracy	Alan Lawes	3.3	1,279	1,310	1,380	1,440		
Labour	Tracy McElhinney	3.0	1,166	1,229	1,241			
Independent	John Malone	1.1	439	486				
Electorate: 64,600 Valid: 38,605 Spoilt: 315 Quota: 9,652 Turnout: 38,920 (60.3%)

=== 2011 general election ===
2011 general election: Meath West
Party	Candidate	FPv%	Count				
Party	Candidate	FPv%	1	2	3	4	5
Fine Gael	Damien English	23.1	9,290	9,609	10,122		
Sinn Féin	Peadar Tóibín	17.4	6,989	7,421	7,711	8,155	9,112
Labour	Jenny McHugh	13.5	5,432	5,852	6,040	6,794	7,798
Fine Gael	Ray Butler	13.1	5,262	5,414	5,574	7,879	8,926
Fine Gael	Catherine Yore	9.7	3,898	4,072	4,208		
Fianna Fáil	Johnny Brady	9.4	3,789	3,874	6,065	6,437	
Fianna Fáil	Shane Cassells	8.7	3,496	3,631			
Green	Fiona Irwin	1.2	479				
Independent	Stephen Ball	1.2	475				
Independent	Dáithí Stephens	1.0	387				
Independent	Ronan Carolan	0.6	258				
Christian Solidarity	Manus MacMeanmain	0.6	234				
Workers' Party	Séamus McDonagh	0.5	189				
Electorate: 62,776 Valid: 40,178 Spoilt: 413 (1.0%) Quota: 10,045 Turnout: 40,591 (64.7%)

=== 2007 general election ===
2007 general election: Meath West
Party	Candidate	FPv%	Count						
Party	Candidate	FPv%	1	2	3	4	5	6	7
Fianna Fáil	Noel Dempsey	29.7	12,006						
Fianna Fáil	Johnny Brady	21.9	8,868	10,178					
Fine Gael	Damien English	17.9	7,227	7,427	7,566	7,856	8,527	9,548	12,934
Sinn Féin	Joe Reilly	11.3	4,567	4,697	4,803	5,024	5,187	5,588	6,015
Fine Gael	Peter Higgins	8.0	3,234	3,335	3,424	3,534	3,960	4,379	
Labour	Brian Collins	4.0	1,634	1,663	1,734	2,097	2,181		
Fine Gael	Graham Geraghty	3.2	1,284	1,326	1,360	1,420			
Green	Brian Flanagan	2.5	1,011	1,047	1,194				
Independent	Phil Cantwell	1.3	506	544					
Fathers Rights	Paul Coleman	0.3	127	130					
Electorate: 56,267 Valid: 40,464 Spoilt: 388 (0.9%) Quota: 10,117 Turnout: 40,852 (72.6%)

== See also ==
- Elections in the Republic of Ireland
- Politics of the Republic of Ireland
- List of political parties in the Republic of Ireland
