= Kells Upper =

Barony in County Meath, Ireland

Kells Upper Ceanannas Uachtarach (Irish)
- Barony
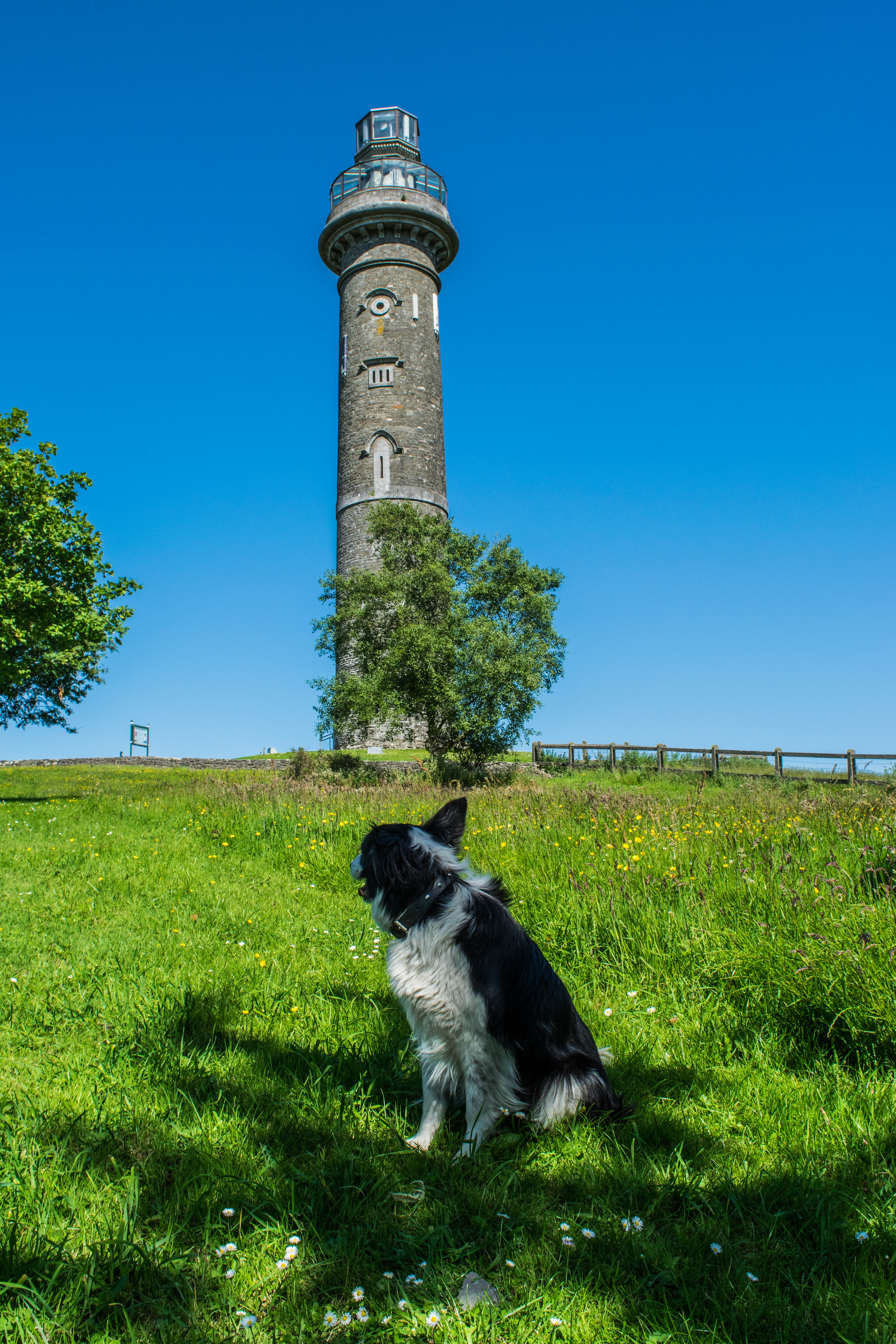
- Tower of Lloyd near Kells

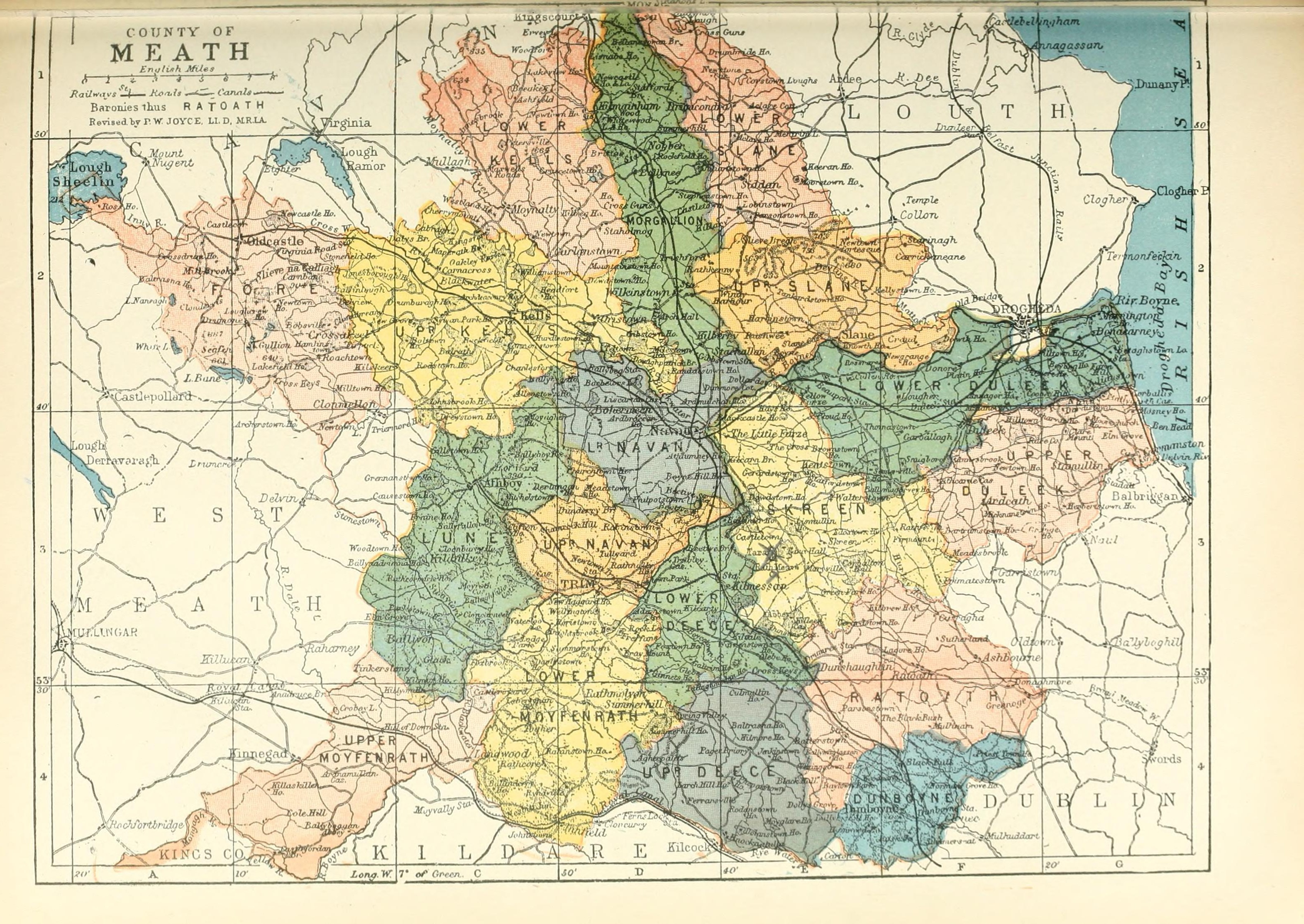
- Barony map of County Meath, 1900; Kells Upper is in the west, coloured yellow.

- Location within Ireland
- Coordinates: 53°43′N 6°53′W
- Sovereign state: Ireland
- Province: Leinster
- County: Meath

Area
  - Total: 200.5 km^{2} (77.4 sq mi)

Kells Upper or Upper Kells (Irish: Ceanannas Uachtarach) is a historical barony in western County Meath, Ireland.

Baronies were mainly cadastral rather than administrative units. They acquired modest local taxation and spending functions in the 19th century before being superseded by the Local Government (Ireland) Act 1898.

== History ==
Prior to the Norman invasion of Ireland, the Kells Upper area was part of the territory of the Ciannachta. The barony of Kells existed before 1542 in the Lordship of Meath; it took its name from the town of Kells. Kells was divided into Lower (northern) and Upper (southern) halves by 1807.

== Geography ==
Kells Upper is in the west of the county, with the Kells Blackwater river flowing across it. It has borders with Westmeath to the southwest and County Cavan to the northwest.

== List of settlements ==
Settlements within the historical barony of Kells Upper include:

- Carnaross
- Crossakiel
- Donaghpatrick
- Gibstown (Irish: Baile Ghib)
- Kells
- Kilskeer
- Julianstown
- Stamullen
