= Aisling Dempsey =

Irish politician

Aisling Dempsey TD
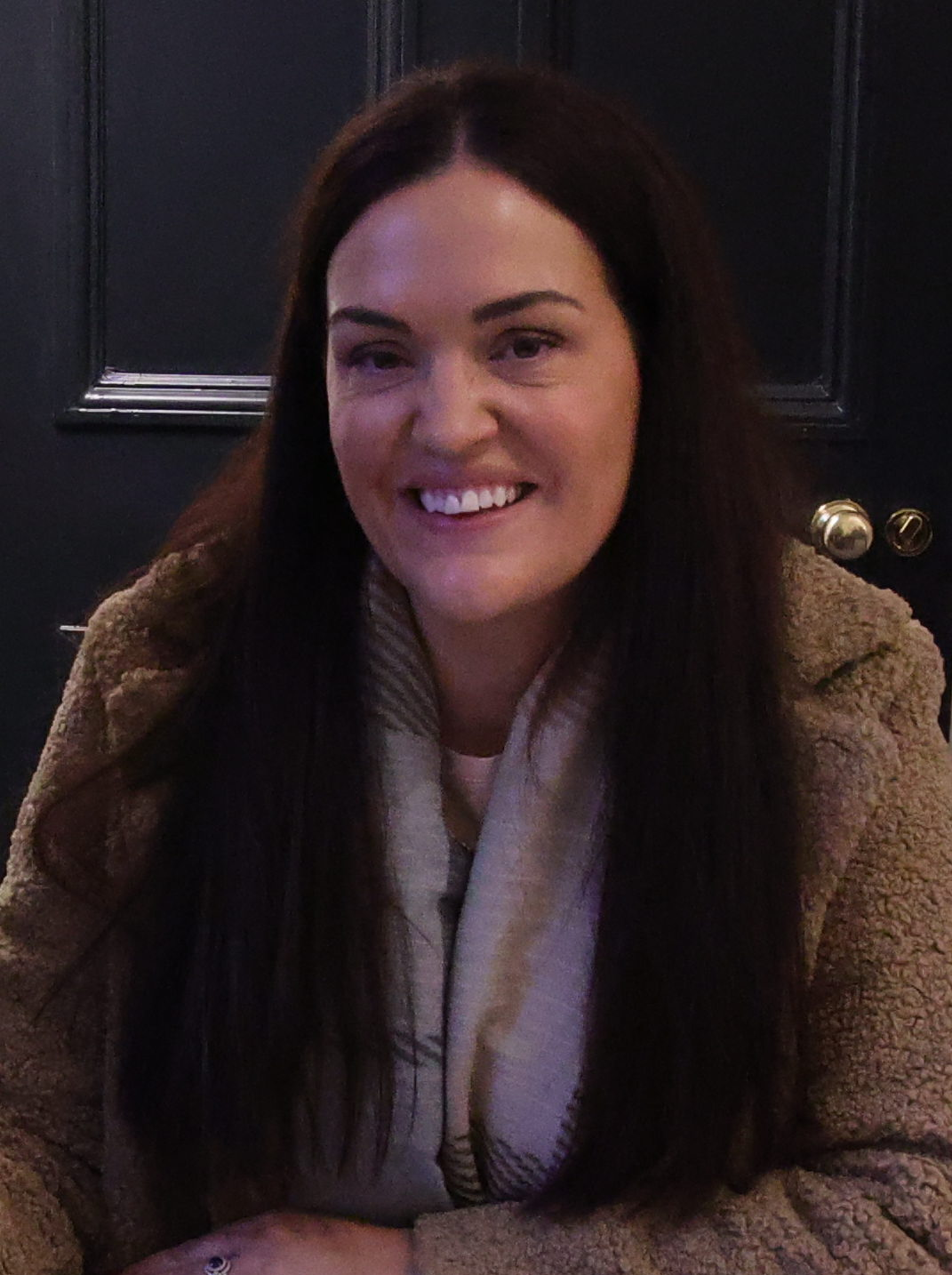
- Dempsey in 2024

Teachta Dála
- Incumbent
- Assumed office November 2024
- Constituency: Meath West

Personal details
- Party: Fianna Fáil
- Spouse: James Flood
- Children: 2
- Parent: Noel Dempsey (father)

Aisling Dempsey is an Irish Fianna Fáil politician who has been a Teachta Dála (TD) for the Meath West constituency since the 2024 general election.

She was first elected to Meath County Council for the Trim local electoral area at the 2019 Meath County Council election and retained her seat at the 2024 Meath County Council election, subsequently becoming Cathaoirleach of the Municipal District.

Her father Noel Dempsey was a Fianna Fáil TD from 1987 to 2011 and a former Minister. Dempsey is the first female TD to represent Meath West.

As of 2024, she worked for Glenveagh Homes. She is married to James Flood, has two children and lives in Trim.

Dáil	Election	Deputy (Party)	Deputy (Party)	Deputy (Party)
30th	2007	Johnny Brady (FF)	Noel Dempsey (FF)	Damien English (FG)
31st	2011	Peadar Tóibín (Note: Left Sinn Féin 15 November 2018; formed Aontú 28 January 2019.) (SF)	Ray Butler (FG)	Damien English (FG)
32nd	2016	Peadar Tóibín (SF)	Shane Cassells (FF)	Damien English (FG)
33rd	2020	Peadar Tóibín (Aon)	Johnny Guirke (SF)	Damien English (FG)
34th	2024	Peadar Tóibín (Aon)	Johnny Guirke (SF)	Aisling Dempsey (FF)
