= Noel Dempsey =

Irish former politician (born 1953)

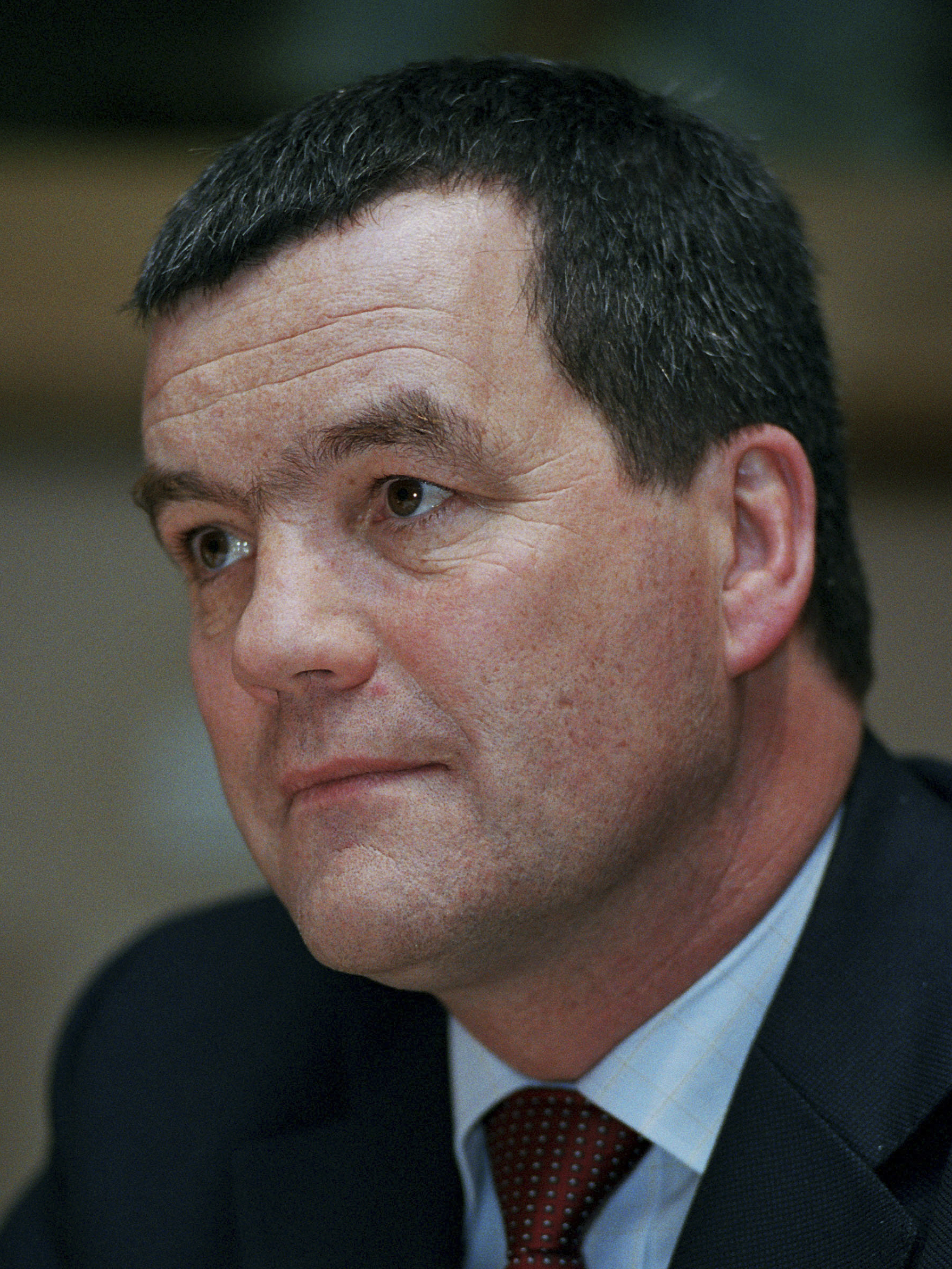
- Dempsey in 2004

Minister for Transport
- In office 14 June 2007 – 19 January 2011
- Taoiseach: Bertie Ahern; Brian Cowen
- Preceded by: Martin Cullen
- Succeeded by: Pat Carey

Minister for Communications, Marine and Natural Resources
- In office 29 September 2004 – 14 June 2007
- Taoiseach: Bertie Ahern
- Preceded by: Dermot Ahern
- Succeeded by: Eamon Ryan

Minister for Education and Science
- In office 6 June 2002 – 29 September 2004
- Taoiseach: Bertie Ahern
- Preceded by: Michael Woods
- Succeeded by: Mary Hanafin

Minister for the Environment and Local Government
- In office 26 June 1997 – 6 June 2002
- Taoiseach: Bertie Ahern
- Preceded by: Brendan Howlin
- Succeeded by: Martin Cullen

Minister of State
- 1993–1994: Finance
- 1992–1994: Government Chief Whip
- 1992–1994: Defence

Teachta Dála
- In office May 2007 – February 2011
- Constituency: Meath West
- In office February 1987 – May 2007
- Constituency: Meath

Personal details
- Born: 6 January 1953 (age 73) Trim, County Meath, Ireland
- Party: Fianna Fáil
- Spouse: Bernadette Rattigan (m. 1990)
- Children: 4, including Aisling
- Education: University College Dublin; St Patrick's College, Maynooth

Noel Dempsey (born 6 January 1953) is an Irish former Fianna Fáil politician who served as Minister for Transport from 2007 to 2011, Minister for Communications, Marine and Natural Resources from 2004 to 2007, Minister for Education and Science from 2002 to 2004, Minister for the Environment and Local Government from 1997 to 2002, Minister of State at the Department of Finance from 1993 to 1994, Minister of State at the Department of Defence and Government Chief Whip from 1992 to 1994. He served as a Teachta Dála (TD) from 1987 to 2011.

== Early and private life ==
Dempsey was born in Trim, County Meath, in 1953. He is one of twelve sons born and educated locally at Scoil Naomh Brid in Boardsmill and St. Michael's CBS in Trim. Dempsey later attended University College Dublin where he was conferred with a Bachelor of Arts degree as well as a diploma in career guidance. He subsequently completed a Higher Diploma in Education at St Patrick's College, Maynooth and worked as a career guidance teacher for many years.

Dempsey is married to Bernadette Rattigan and they have four children – two sons and two daughters. He is also a member of the Gaelic Athletic Association and is a keen supporter of the Meath Gaelic football team as well as his local club teams. He has also been a member of Macra na Feirme and Muintir na Tíre.

== Early political career ==
Dempsey first became involved in politics in the early 1970s when he joined Ógra Fianna Fáil, the youth wing of Fianna Fáil. He later attended and spoke at the first-ever national conference of Ógra in 1973. Within three years of this Dempsey was co-opted onto Meath County Council as a Fianna Fáil County Councillor in 1977, following the death of John Bird. At the time he was the youngest ever member of that authority and he later served as the youngest ever chairman of the council in 1986. Dempsey enhanced his local political profile at this time by also serving as a member of Trim Urban District Council.

Dempsey was first elected to Dáil Éireann at the 1987 general election as a Fianna Fáil TD for Meath. Shortly after being elected, he became a member of the Public Accounts Committee, one of the most high-profile committees in the Oireachtas. Dempsey was initially a supporter of the Fianna Fáil leader Charles Haughey; however, he became disillusioned with his leadership when he led Fianna Fáil into coalition with the Progressive Democrats following the 1989 general election. He was one of a number of TDs who were vehemently opposed to such a move. As a result of this Dempsey remained on the backbenches.

In September 1991, Dempsey was a key member of the so-called "gang of four" which proposed a motion of no confidence in Charles Haughey as the leader of the party. The other members of the group were Seán Power, Liam Fitzgerald and M. J. Nolan. Dempsey supported Albert Reynolds in his unsuccessful bid to oust Haughey on that occasion. In 1992, Reynolds eventually became party leader and Taoiseach and Dempsey's loyalty was rewarded by being appointed Minister of State with responsibility as government Chief Whip. He also took charge of the Office of Public Works. He served in these positions until the resignation of Reynolds as Taoiseach and the collapse of the Fianna Fáil-Labour Party in 1994.

In December 1994, Bertie Ahern became leader of Fianna Fáil as the party moved into opposition. Dempsey was appointed to the front bench as Spokesperson on the Environment and Local Government. During this period in opposition, he was heavily involved in key election strategies, most notably in the Dublin West by-election which was won by Brian Lenihan Jnr. It was Fianna Fáil's first by-election victory since 1985.

== Cabinet career: 1997–2011 ==
=== Minister for the Environment and Local Government: 1997–2002 ===
Following the 1997 general election Dempsey was a key player in helping to negotiate a programme for government between Fianna Fáil and the Progressive Democrats. When Bertie Ahern became Taoiseach Dempsey was appointed to the position of Minister for the Environment and Local Government. His tenure as Minister has been described as one of reform and modernisation, with Frank McDonald of The Irish Times even describing Dempsey as the best holder of the environment portfolio since the position was created.

Some of Dempsey's major achievements as Minister include the introduction of the Local Government Act 2000 which was seen as the most comprehensive reform of local government in Ireland for over a century. One of his best-known initiatives was the introduction of a levy on plastic shopping bags leading to a reduction in the usage of these bags and a serious decrease in the litter problem related to these plastic bags. Dempsey also proposed to end the 'dual mandate' whereby a person can serve as a county councillor and hold another elected office at the same time. This proposal, however, led to severe opposition from the Independent TDs who supported the government at the time and had to be deferred. The legislation eventually became law in 2003.

During his tenure as Minister, Dempsey continued to serve as the Fianna Fáil director of elections. His first major success was the election of Mary McAleese to the position of President of Ireland in 1997. Two years later in 1999 he presided over the most successful local election campaign for the party ever.

=== Minister for Education and Science: 2002–2004 ===
Following the re-election of the government in 2002, Dempsey became Minister for Education and Science. He took over as Minister at a time when one of the teachers' unions was extremely dissatisfied with a number of pay issues. These issues were eventually resolved in 2002 shortly after taking office. As Minister for Education, Dempsey was forced into an embarrassing climb down in 2004 on his proposal to re-introduce third-level fees. The move was opposed by the Union of Students in Ireland and by the Progressive Democrats.

=== Minister for Communications, Marine and Natural Resources: 2004–2007 ===
In a cabinet reshuffle in September 2004, Dempsey was appointed as Minister for Communications, Marine and Natural Resources. During his tenure, he oversaw the controversial Corrib gas project. After agreeing to have an independent assessment of the raw gas pipeline planned for Kilcommon, Erris, Dempsey employed a firm to carry it out. Only after the report was concluded did it emerge that the firm was half owned by Royal Dutch Shell, a fact which they neglected to relate to the Minister. An embarrassed Dempsey was forced to hastily commission another report.

Coming to the end of his tenure at the Department of Communications, Marine and Natural Resources and before the 2007 general election, his department pursued the resurrection of Digital Terrestrial Television following its failure to be established under the Broadcasting Act 2001 due to unfavourable economic conditions for venture capital around the DTT market in many countries in 2001. First, his department invited tenders to build and programme a DTT trial in Dublin and County Louth. The failure seemed to lie around a commercial network builder model and the difficulties in creating revenue generation return for such investment and the solution seems to be the involvement of broadcasters in building the networks. An amended piece of legislation amended this model towards a multiple-operator model and resulted in the Broadcasting (Amendment) Act 2007. A similar model has been successful during the intervening years in the UK and Spain.

To that end his department also established a DTT trial in August 2006 to run for 2 years around Three Rock, Dublin transmitter and Clermont Carn, in County Louth.

=== Minister for Transport: 2007–2011 ===
Following the 2007 general election Dempsey was appointed as Minister for Transport. Among the legislation introduced was the requirement of those on provisional driving licences to be accompanied by a qualified driver, which came into effect on 1 July 2008. Dempsey received widespread criticism across the Irish media over his January 2010 holiday in Malta and perceived lack of contactability when severe weather conditions led to massive disruption across Ireland's transport systems.

=== Retirement from politics ===
On 17 December 2010, he announced that he would not be contesting the 2011 general election. On 19 January 2011, he announced his resignation as Minister for Transport.

Dempsey receives annual pension payments of €119,177.

In August 2020, he attended a golf party in County Galway which breached the COVID-19 guidelines.

Political offices
Preceded by Dermot Ahern	Government Chief Whip; 1992–1994	Succeeded by Seán Barrett
Preceded by Dermot Ahern	Minister of State at the Department of Defence; 1992–1994	Succeeded by Seán Barrett
Preceded by Noel Treacy	Minister of State at the Department of Finance; 1993–1994	Succeeded by Phil Hogan
Preceded by Brendan Howlin as Minister for the Environment	Minister for Environment and Local Government; 1997–2002	Succeeded by Martin Cullen as Minister for the Environment, Heritage and Local Government
Preceded by Michael Woods	Minister for Education and Science; 2002–2004	Succeeded by Mary Hanafin
Preceded by Dermot Ahern	Minister for Communications, Marine and Natural Resources; 2004–2007	Succeeded by Eamon Ryan as Minister for Communications, Energy and Natural Resources
Preceded by Martin Cullen	Minister for Transport; 2007–2011	Succeeded by Pat Carey

Dáil	Election	Deputy (Party)	Deputy (Party)	Deputy (Party)
4th	1923	Patrick Mulvany (FP)	David Hall (Lab)	Eamonn Duggan (CnaG)
5th	1927 (Jun)	Matthew O'Reilly (FF)	David Hall (Lab)	Eamonn Duggan (CnaG)
6th	1927 (Sep)	Matthew O'Reilly (FF)	Arthur Matthews (CnaG)	Eamonn Duggan (CnaG)
7th	1932	James Kelly (FF)	Arthur Matthews (CnaG)	Eamonn Duggan (CnaG)
8th	1933	James Kelly (FF)	Robert Davitt (CnaG)	Matthew O'Reilly (FF)
9th	1937	Constituency abolished. See Meath–Westmeath		

Dáil	Election	Deputy (Party)	Deputy (Party)	Deputy (Party)	Deputy (Party)	Deputy (Party)
13th	1948	Matthew O'Reilly (FF)	Michael Hilliard (FF)	3 seats until 1977	Patrick Giles (FG)	3 seats until 1977
14th	1951	Matthew O'Reilly (FF)	Michael Hilliard (FF)	3 seats until 1977	Patrick Giles (FG)	3 seats until 1977
15th	1954	James Tully (Lab)	Michael Hilliard (FF)	3 seats until 1977	Patrick Giles (FG)	3 seats until 1977
16th	1957	James Griffin (FF)	Michael Hilliard (FF)	3 seats until 1977	Patrick Giles (FG)	3 seats until 1977
16th	1959 by-election	Henry Johnston (FF)	Michael Hilliard (FF)	3 seats until 1977	Patrick Giles (FG)	3 seats until 1977
17th	1961	James Tully (Lab)	Michael Hilliard (FF)	3 seats until 1977	Denis Farrelly (FG)	3 seats until 1977
18th	1965	James Tully (Lab)	Michael Hilliard (FF)	3 seats until 1977	Denis Farrelly (FG)	3 seats until 1977
19th	1969	James Tully (Lab)	Michael Hilliard (FF)	3 seats until 1977	John Bruton (FG)	3 seats until 1977
20th	1973	James Tully (Lab)	Brendan Crinion (FF)	3 seats until 1977	John Bruton (FG)	3 seats until 1977
21st	1977	James Tully (Lab)	Brendan Crinion (FF)	Jim Fitzsimons (FF)	John Bruton (FG)	4 seats 1977–1981
22nd	1981	James Tully (Lab)	Brendan Crinion (FF)	Jim Fitzsimons (FF)	John Bruton (FG)	John V. Farrelly (FG)
23rd	1982 (Feb)	Michael Lynch (FF)	Colm Hilliard (FF)	Jim Fitzsimons (FF)	John Bruton (FG)	John V. Farrelly (FG)
24th	1982 (Nov)	Frank McLoughlin (Lab)	Colm Hilliard (FF)	Jim Fitzsimons (FF)	John Bruton (FG)	John V. Farrelly (FG)
25th	1987	Michael Lynch (FF)	Colm Hilliard (FF)	Noel Dempsey (FF)	John Bruton (FG)	John V. Farrelly (FG)
26th	1989	Mary Wallace (FF)	Colm Hilliard (FF)	Noel Dempsey (FF)	John Bruton (FG)	John V. Farrelly (FG)
27th	1992	Mary Wallace (FF)	Colm Hilliard (FF)	Noel Dempsey (FF)	John Bruton (FG)	Brian Fitzgerald (Lab)
28th	1997	Mary Wallace (FF)	Johnny Brady (FF)	Noel Dempsey (FF)	John Bruton (FG)	John V. Farrelly (FG)
29th	2002	Mary Wallace (FF)	Johnny Brady (FF)	Noel Dempsey (FF)	John Bruton (FG)	Damien English (FG)
29th	2005 by-election	Mary Wallace (FF)	Johnny Brady (FF)	Noel Dempsey (FF)	Shane McEntee (FG)	Damien English (FG)
30th	2007	Constituency abolished. See Meath East and Meath West				

Dáil	Election	Deputy (Party)	Deputy (Party)	Deputy (Party)
30th	2007	Johnny Brady (FF)	Noel Dempsey (FF)	Damien English (FG)
31st	2011	Peadar Tóibín (Note: Left Sinn Féin 15 November 2018; formed Aontú 28 January 2019.) (SF)	Ray Butler (FG)	Damien English (FG)
32nd	2016	Peadar Tóibín (SF)	Shane Cassells (FF)	Damien English (FG)
33rd	2020	Peadar Tóibín (Aon)	Johnny Guirke (SF)	Damien English (FG)
34th	2024	Peadar Tóibín (Aon)	Johnny Guirke (SF)	Aisling Dempsey (FF)
