= St. Columb's House =

- St. Columcille's House
- Teach Naomh Cholumba
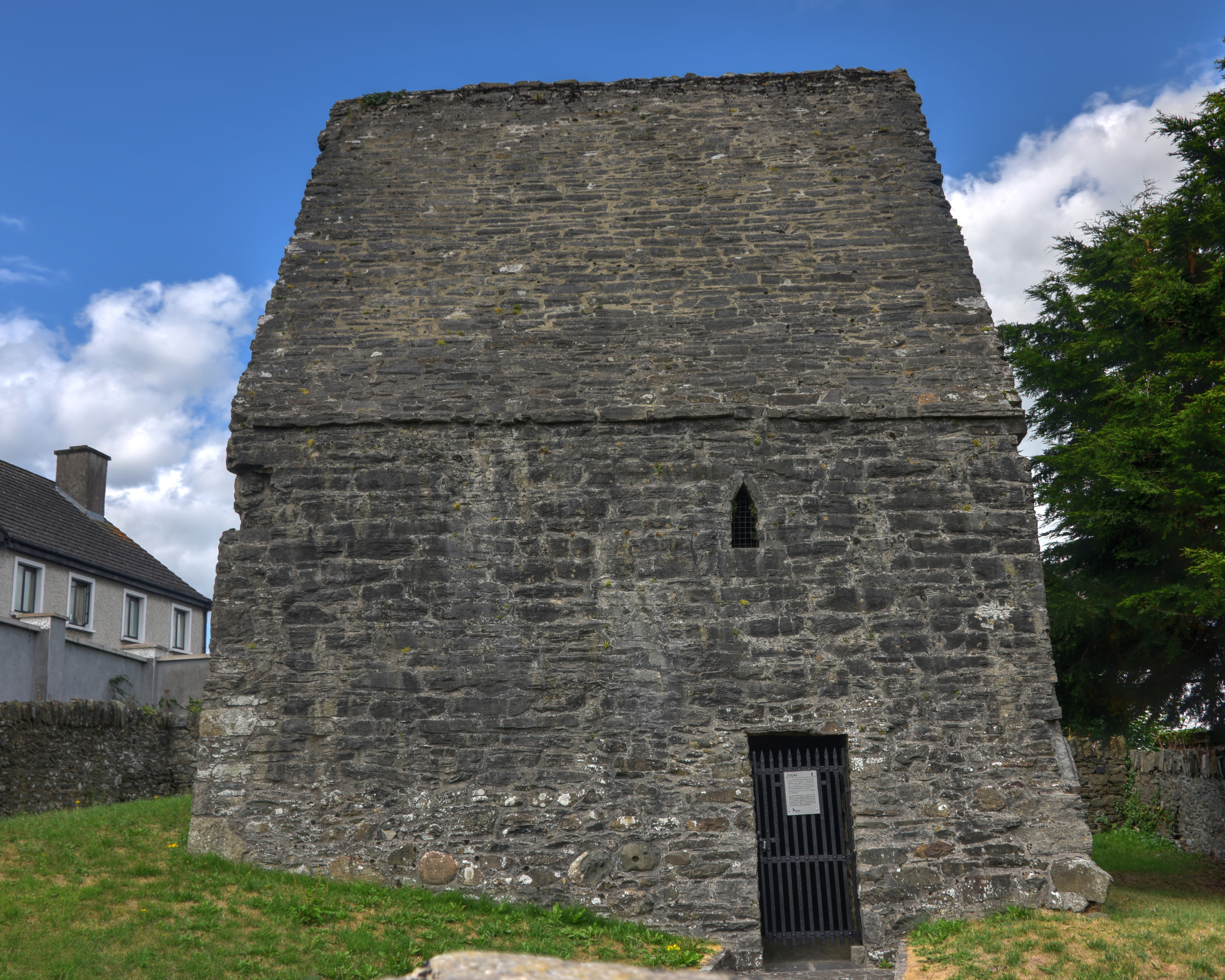

- Location within Ireland
- 53.728253°N 6.880766°W
- Location: Church Lane, Kells, County Meath
- Country: Ireland
- Denomination: Pre-Reformation Catholic

History
- Founder(s): Cellach mac Congaile, Abbot of Iona
- Dedication: Columba

Architecture
- Heritage designation

National monument of Ireland
- Official name: St. Columb's House
- Reference no.: 108
- Style: Celtic monastic
- Years built: likely 10th century

Specifications
- Length: 5.8 m (19 ft)
- Width: 4.7 m (15 ft)
- Height: 7 m (23 ft)

Administration
- Diocese: Meath

St. Columb's House (or St. Columcille's House) is an oratory and National Monument in Kells, County Meath, Ireland.

== Location ==
St. Columb's House is located on Church Lane in Kells, immediately northwest of the Abbey of Kells.

== History ==
St. Columb's House is today thought to mostly date to the 10th century. It is named after Columba (Colm Cille), whose relics it may once have housed.

The roof was modified at a later date. The house was used by monks to say the Liturgy of the Hours, or possibly as a shrine church or burial place of an abbot. It once contained a large flat stone called "St Columb's Bed", possibly a grave slab. His relics were brought to Kells in 878, and moved to Skryne Church later before finally going to Downpatrick.

== Building ==
St. Columb's House is a rectangular building with a very high pointed roof. Internally there was originally a high floor 1.5 m (5 feet) above the ground, but this is gone.

The loft contains three separate rooms.

An underground passage connecting the house with the nearby church is mentioned by the Annals of the four Masters and a 17th-century survey.
