= Ray Butler (politician) =

Irish politician (born 1965)

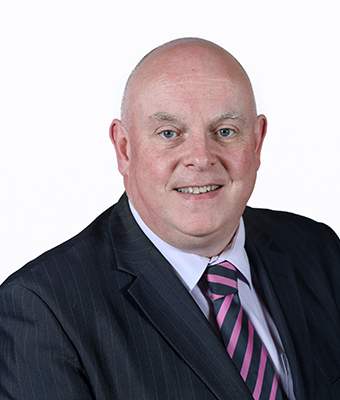

Senator
- In office 8 June 2016 – 29 June 2020
- Constituency: Nominated by the Taoiseach

Teachta Dála
- In office February 2011 – February 2016
- Constituency: Meath West

Personal details
- Born: Raymond Butler; 30 December 1965 (age 60) Kells, County Meath, Ireland
- Party: Fine Gael
- Spouse: Marie Butler (m. 1995)
- Children: 4
- Education: NUI Galway

Raymond Butler (born 30 December 1965) is an Irish former Fine Gael politician who served as a Senator from 2016 to 2020, after being nominated by the Taoiseach. He previously served as a Teachta Dála (TD) for the Meath West constituency from 2011 to 2016.

Living in Trim, Butler's family is originally from Kells. He served on Trim Town Council from 2004 to 2011, including a year as mayor of that council, and was elected to Meath County Council in May 2009.

He lost his seat at the 2016 general election. Butler was nominated to the 25th Seanad in May 2016.

In 2019, it was reported that Butler had taken three years to repay the €30,000 severance allowance he received after losing his Dáil seat, which became forfeit and repayable once he accepted a nomination to the Seanad.

Dáil	Election	Deputy (Party)	Deputy (Party)	Deputy (Party)
30th	2007	Johnny Brady (FF)	Noel Dempsey (FF)	Damien English (FG)
31st	2011	Peadar Tóibín (Note: Left Sinn Féin 15 November 2018; formed Aontú 28 January 2019.) (SF)	Ray Butler (FG)	Damien English (FG)
32nd	2016	Peadar Tóibín (SF)	Shane Cassells (FF)	Damien English (FG)
33rd	2020	Peadar Tóibín (Aon)	Johnny Guirke (SF)	Damien English (FG)
34th	2024	Peadar Tóibín (Aon)	Johnny Guirke (SF)	Aisling Dempsey (FF)
