= Peadar Tóibín =

Irish politician (born 1974)

Peadar Tóibín TD
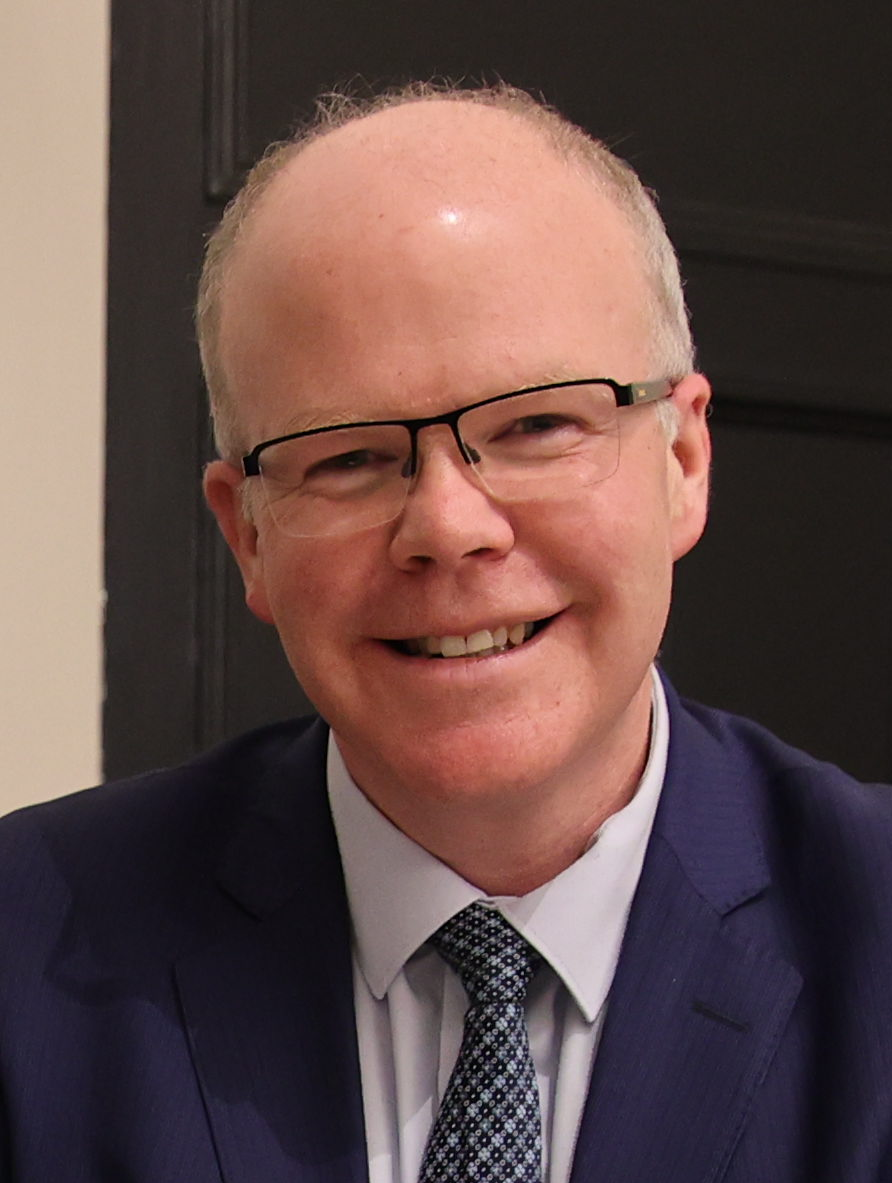
- Tóibín in 2024

Leader of Aontú
- Incumbent
- Assumed office 28 January 2019
- Deputy: Anne McCloskey; Denise Mullen; Gemma Brolly
- Preceded by: New office

Chair of the Committee on Arts, Heritage, Regional, Rural and Gaeltacht Affairs
- In office 4 April 2016 – 15 November 2018
- Preceded by: New office
- Succeeded by: Aengus Ó Snodaigh

Teachta Dála
- Incumbent
- Assumed office February 2011
- Constituency: Meath West

Personal details
- Born: 19 June 1974 (age 52) Drogheda, County Louth, Ireland
- Party: Aontú (since 2019)
- Other political affiliations: Independent (2018); Sinn Féin (1998–2018); Fianna Fáil (pre-1998)
- Spouse: Deirdre Tóibín
- Children: 4
- Education: University College Dublin; Michael Smurfit Graduate Business School

Peadar Tóibín (Irish: [ˈpʲad̪ˠəɾˠ t̪ˠoːˈbʲiːnʲ]; born 19 June 1974) is an Irish politician who has served as leader of Aontú since January 2019. He has been a Teachta Dála (TD) for the Meath West constituency since 2011. He previously served as Chair of the Committee on Arts, Heritage, Regional, Rural and Gaeltacht Affairs from 2016 to 2018.

He was elected as a Sinn Féin candidate in 2011, but resigned from the party on 15 November 2018, due to his opposition to the party's stance on abortion. He founded Aontú in January 2019.

== Early life ==
Tóibín was born in Drogheda, County Louth, the youngest of seven siblings. He studied economics and politics at University College Dublin and went on to complete a postgraduate qualification in enterprise at the Michael Smurfit Graduate Business School. Before being elected as a TD, he worked as an independent management consultant in the enterprise sector in Ireland and Scotland.

== Political career ==
While studying in University College Dublin, Tóibín was a member of Fianna Fáil and an active member of the UCD branch, the Kevin Barry Cumann. He joined Sinn Féin in 1998. Speaking in 2020, Tóibín commented on his departure from Fianna Fáil by saying "I felt that Fianna Fáil had good people within them, but a lot of the people in Fianna Fáil were career ambitious for themselves and the ideology and the objectives were secondary or weren't as important".

=== Sinn Féin (2004–2018) ===
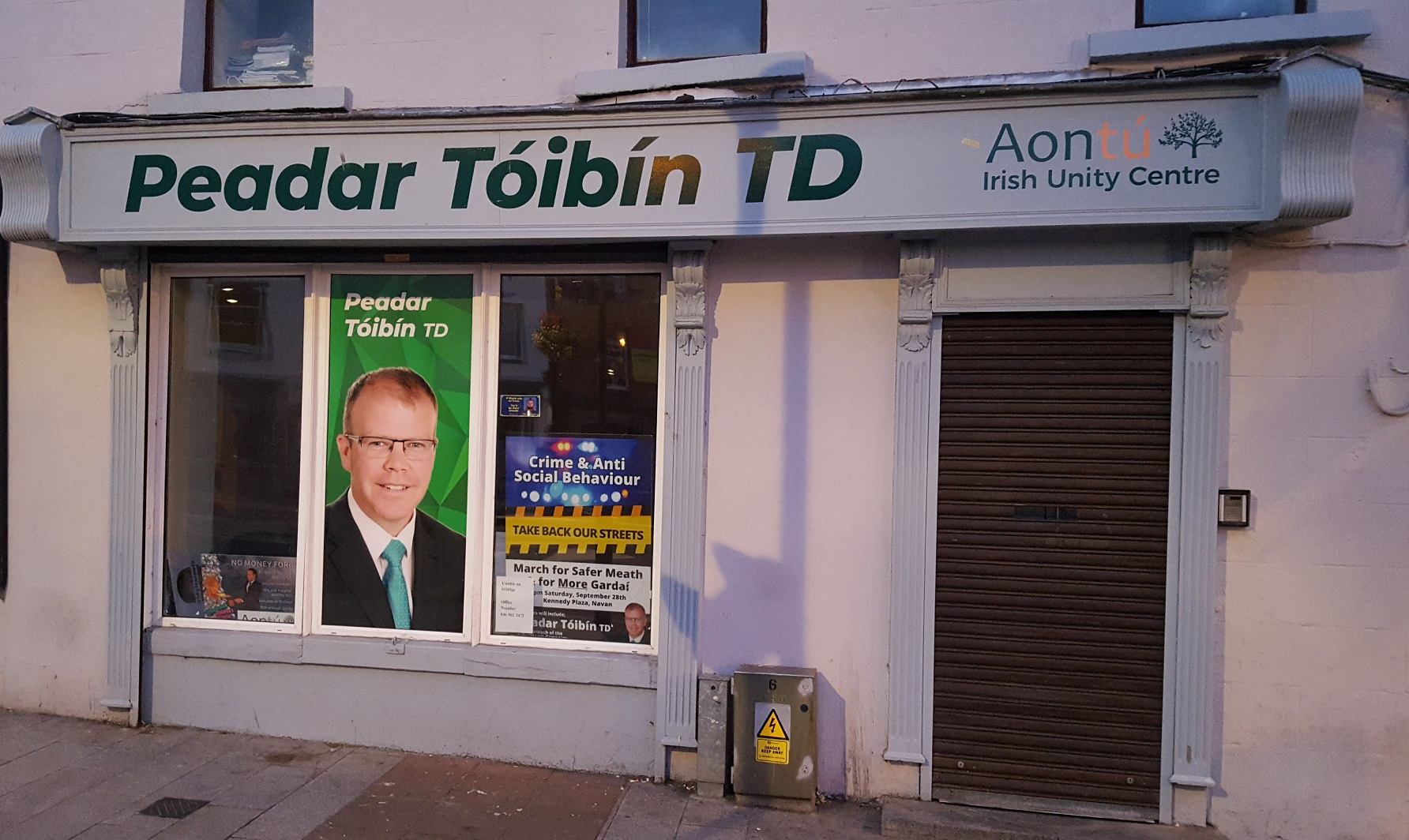
Peadar Tóibín constituency office in Navan, County Meath

At the 2004 local elections, he stood unsuccessfully for Navan Town Council, and for the Navan local electoral area of Meath County Council. He was co-opted onto Navan Town Council in November 2007, and held that seat at the 2009 local elections, when he was again unsuccessful in the county council election.

Tóibín was suspended from the Sinn Féin parliamentary party for six months in July 2013, when he defied the party whip by voting against the Protection of Life During Pregnancy Bill 2013.

He called for a 'No' vote in the 2018 Referendum on the Eighth Amendment. He and his party colleague Carol Nolan, who had been suspended from Sinn Féin for voting against policy on the abortion issue, were the only representatives from the party to attend a photocall in Merrion Square in Dublin to publicise the 'No' campaign.

Tóibín was again suspended from the Sinn Féin parliamentary party for six months in October 2018, when he defied the party whip by voting against the Regulation of Termination of Pregnancy Bill 2018.

On 15 November 2018, Tóibín announced his resignation from Sinn Féin, saying that restrictions imposed on him by the party over his views on abortion had "prevented me from fully representing my constituents".

=== Aontú (2019–present) ===
After resigning from Sinn Féin in November 2018, Tóibín announced that he would attempt to establish an alternative political party. On 28 January 2019, he announced that the name of his new political party would be Aontú, Irish for "unity" or "agreement".

At the 2020 general election, Tóibín retained his seat in Meath West with 7,322 first-preference votes, or 17.6%, taking the second of the constituency's three seats.

In February 2022, Tóibín used parliamentary privilege to name Soldier F, a soldier accused of murdering two people on Bloody Sunday. This was the first time the soldier had been identified in the Dáil. He had previously been identified by name in the British parliament, and in Village magazine in Ireland.

In February 2024, Tóibín announced that he would contest the 2024 European Parliament election for the Midlands–North-West constituency. During the election campaign, he stated his intention to stand for re-election in the next general election. Tóibín received 40,742 (6.0%) first-preference votes, but was not elected, being eliminated on the eighteenth count.

On 22 December 2024, The Journal awarded Tóibín 'The Late Debate Debater of the Year' for his 'for his clear and concise communication skills'.

On 20 January 2025, Tóibín defended his party's decision to join the Regional Independents technical group, which at the time was at the centre of a dispute over speaking rights in the Dáil. On 22 January, he confirmed that his party had left the Regional Independents in order to join the Independent Technical Group.

In November 2025, Tóibín criticised Dublin City Council over the name of its end-of-year 'Winter Lights' displays, which he argued should be called 'Christmas Lights' instead; (Note: 'Winter Lights' has been the official name of the project since it was established in 2018; Dublin City Council did not rename their Christmas lights 'Winter Lights'.) he described the name as an example of 'woke uniformity' and 'aggressive secularism'.

On 23 April 2026, Tóibín criticised the Government over the continued use of Special Emergency Arrangements (SEAs) (Note: Special Emergency Arrangements (SEAs) are a type of unregulated emergency accommodation for vulnerable children provided by private operators, including rented apartments or houses, B&Bs and hotels. These placements are supposed to be temporary, however some children have spent several years there.) by Tusla to house vulnerable children; he told the Dáil that in several cases children had been raped, sexual abused, or had died, including by homicide and suicide, while in the care of Tusla.

=== Electoral results ===
Elections to the Dáil
Party	Election		FPv	FPv%	Result
Sinn Féin	Meath West	2011	6,989	17.4	Elected on count 5/5
Sinn Féin	Meath West	2016	9,442	24.5	Elected on count 2/6
Aontú	Meath West	2020	7,322	17.6	Elected on count 6/6
Aontú	Meath West	2024	7,563	20.1	Elected on count 4/5

== Political views ==
The Phoenix has described Tóibín's overall political identity as appealing to "the more socially conservative of nationalist voters", while Gerald Howlin of the Irish Examiner has likened Tóibín's overall political identity to the Sinn Féin of the 1970s under Ruairí Ó Brádaigh's leadership. Tóibín has self-described Aontú as socially conservative but centre-left economically.

Tóibín has cited Abraham Lincoln, Patrick Pearse, James Connolly, Bobby Sands, Sister Stan Kennedy, and Pope Francis as people he admires. He has also acknowledged that Richard Bruton was an effective minister, despite being a political opponent.

=== Abortion ===
Tóibín's most well-known political position is his anti-abortion stance, which ultimately caused his departure from Sinn Féin. Sinn Féin allowed Tóibín to campaign for a No vote during the 2018 Irish referendum on abortion, provided that he would accept the party whip on subsequent votes relating to abortion. However, alongside Carol Nolan, he broke ranks and continued to vote against law reforms regarding abortion in the Dáil. This led to multiple suspensions and proved to become an untenable situation. Once Tóibín formed Aontú, it was generally agreed that the party was broadly anti-abortion in nature.

=== Immigration ===
Tóibín and Aontú have been described as possessing a "strong rightward stance" on immigration; in a 2019 opinion piece for the Irish Examiner, Gerard Howlin characterised Tóibín's views as "nativist". In 2019, Tóibín stated that there was "growing unease and concern among many people in Ireland around the issue of immigration". Tóibín has also stated that "genuine" asylum seekers must be properly looked after but that "asylum seekers cannot be treated better than our own people". Additionally, Tóibín has stated that if asylum seekers can be placed in modular homes, so too can homeless Irish people. Tóibín has called on the Irish government to release crime statistics including the nationality, citizenship status or ethnicity of the perpetrators.

=== Other political parties ===
In December 2022 Tóibín stated that "Sinn Féin is morphing into Fianna Fáil. It will go any direction it feels necessary to get votes" while also commentating that "Other political parties are distracted by virtue-signalling on the latest woke fashion. Aontú is different." Tóibín stated that Aontú would not enter government with Fine Gael "under any circumstances". In the 2025 Irish presidential election, Tóibín spoiled his vote, writing in Maria Steen instead.

== Personal life ==
Tóibín is a business consultant. He is married to Deirdre Tóibín and they have four children. He was the Chairperson of the Save Navan Hospital Campaign. He has a degree in Economics and Politics from University College Dublin (UCD) and a postgraduate degree in enterprise from the Michael Smurfit Graduate Business School.

Tóibín was diagnosed with skin cancer in 2021.

In his personal life, Tóibín enjoys mountain hiking with his family as well as brewing his own cider. He has stated had he not gone into politics, he would have liked to build his own brewery.

== Notes ==
Dáil	Election	Deputy (Party)	Deputy (Party)	Deputy (Party)
30th	2007	Johnny Brady (FF)	Noel Dempsey (FF)	Damien English (FG)
31st	2011	Peadar Tóibín (Note: Left Sinn Féin 15 November 2018; formed Aontú 28 January 2019.) (SF)	Ray Butler (FG)	Damien English (FG)
32nd	2016	Peadar Tóibín (SF)	Shane Cassells (FF)	Damien English (FG)
33rd	2020	Peadar Tóibín (Aon)	Johnny Guirke (SF)	Damien English (FG)
34th	2024	Peadar Tóibín (Aon)	Johnny Guirke (SF)	Aisling Dempsey (FF)
