= Kells, County Meath =

Kells Ceanannas Mór (Irish)
- Town
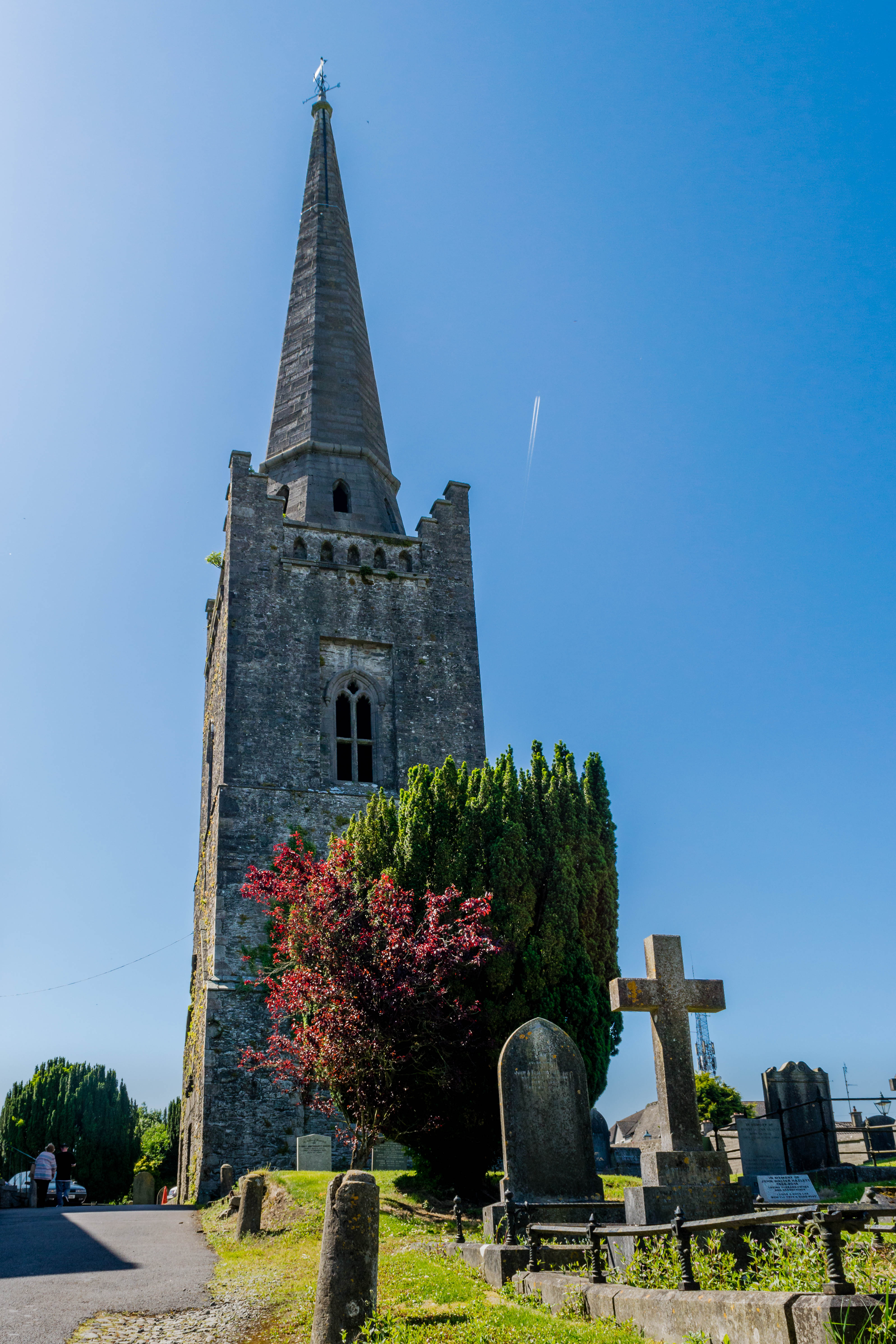
- St Columba's Church of Ireland, Kells

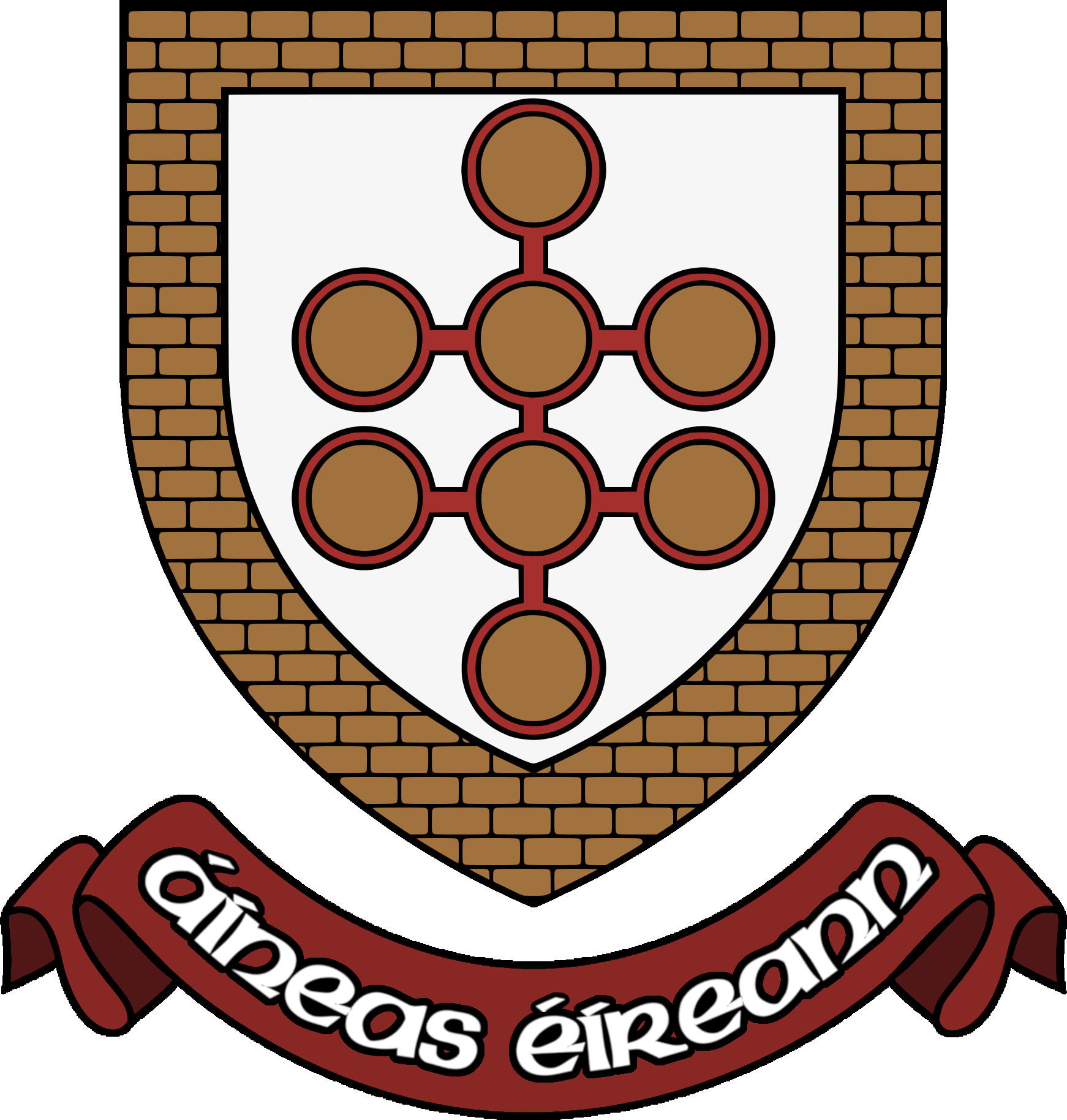
- Coat of arms
- Motto(s): Áineas Éireann "The delight of Ireland"
- Location in Ireland
- Coordinates: 53.7272°N 6.8769°W
- Country: Ireland
- Province: Leinster
- County: County Meath
- Barony: Upper Kells

Area
  - Total: 2.8 km^{2} (1.1 sq mi)
- Elevation: 66 m (217 ft)

Population (2016)
  - Total: 6,608
  - Density: 2,400/km^{2} (6,100/sq mi)
- Eircode routing key: A82
- Telephone area code: +353(0)46
- Irish Grid Reference: N738759

Kells (/ˈkɛlz/; Irish: Ceanannas) (Note: For most of the 20th century the town's official name was Ceanannas Mór. In the late 20th century the town reverted to the more widely known English version of its name, Kells, and dropped Mór from the Irish version of the name.) is a town in County Meath, Ireland. The town lies off the M3 motorway, 16 km (10 mi) from Navan and 65 km (40 mi) from Dublin. Along with other towns in County Meath, it is within the commuter belt for Dublin, and had a population of 6,608 as of the 2022 census. It is best known as the site of Kells Abbey, from which the Book of Kells takes its name. The town is in a civil parish of the same name.

== Name ==
The settlement was originally known by the Irish name Cenannus, later Ceannanas or Ceannanus, and it is suggested that the name "Kells" developed from this. An early name for a dún or fort at the settlement was Cúil Sibrille, this fort probably being located in the centre of present-day Kells. From the 12th century onward, the settlement was referred to in English and Anglo-Norman as Kenenus, Kenelles, Kenles, Kenlis, Kellis and finally Kells. It has also been suggested that Kenlis and Kells come from an alternative Irish name, Ceann Lios (meaning 'Head Fort'). Kells, Kenlis and Headfort all feature in the titles taken by the Taylor family.

In 1929, Ceanannas Mór became the town's official name in both Irish and English. Following the creation of the Irish Free State, a number of towns were renamed likewise. Ceanannas has been the official Irish-language form of the place name since 1969. In 1993, Kells was re-adopted as the town's official name in English.

== History ==
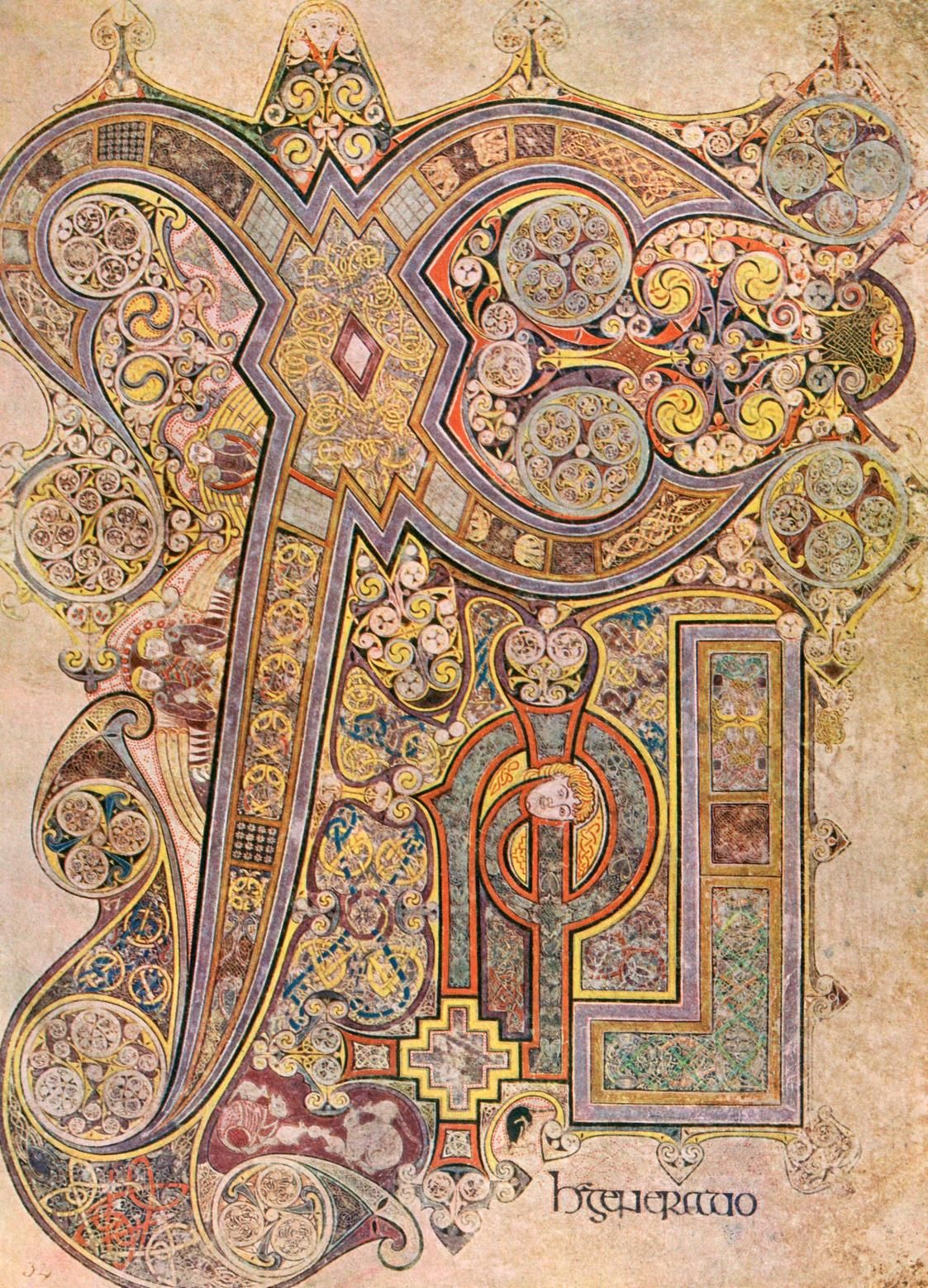
Folio 34r of the Book of Kells is illustrated with the Chi Rho monogram

Before Kells was a monastery, it was a royal site inhabited by the High King Cormac mac Airt who moved his residence from the Hill of Tara, for what reasons scholars are yet not sure.

Kells was an important place on one of the five ancient roads that came out of Tara – this road being named Slí nan nAssail and which ran from Tara to Rathcrogan, another royal site, in County Roscommon.

About 560 AD, Colmcille (later known as Columba) – a prince of the royal house of the Northern Uí Néill family – acquired Kells in recompense of a fault acted against him by his cousin the High King Diarmuid MacCarroll, who granted him the Dun (fortification) of Ceannanus to establish a Monastery.

The present monastery at Kells is thought to have been founded around 804 AD by monks from St Colmcille's monastery in Iona who were fleeing Viking invasions.

In 1152, the Synod of Kells completed the transition of the Colmcille's establishment from a monastic church to a diocesan church. A later synod reduced the status of Kells to that of a parish. Following the Norman invasion of Ireland, Hugh de Lacy was granted the Lordship of Meath in 1182. The religious establishments at Kells continued to flourish under their Anglo-Norman overlords. In the fifteenth century the parish of St. Columba's was granted to the Archdeacon of Meath and his successors.

Kells became a border town garrison of the Pale and was the scene of many battles between the Kingdom of Breifne and the Hiberno-Normans (who had heavily intermarried). From 1561 to 1801, the constituency of Kells returned two MPs to the Irish House of Commons. During the Irish rebellion of 1641, Kells was burned by the O'Reilly clan during their attacks on the Pale.

The period of the Great Famine saw the population of Kells drop by 38% as measured by the census records of 1841 and 1851. The Workhouse and the Fever Hospital were described as full to overflowing.

== Places of interest ==
The Kells monastic site, including the Kells Round Tower, is associated with St Colmcille (also known as Columba), the Book of Kells, now kept at Trinity College Dublin, and the Kells Crozier, exhibited at the British Museum. The besides the early medieval round tower, also the steeple of St Columba's church is (partly) medieval, but the nave was built in 1578, after the medieval nave had been ruined by wars. Four large Celtic crosses can still be viewed today. Four of the crosses are in the churchyard of St Columba's Church on the Monastic Site. The other Celtic cross was positioned in the middle of a busy crossroads until an accident involving a school bus. It now stands in front of a former courthouse. A roof protects the cross from the elements. A replica also stands safe from the elements inside the museum.

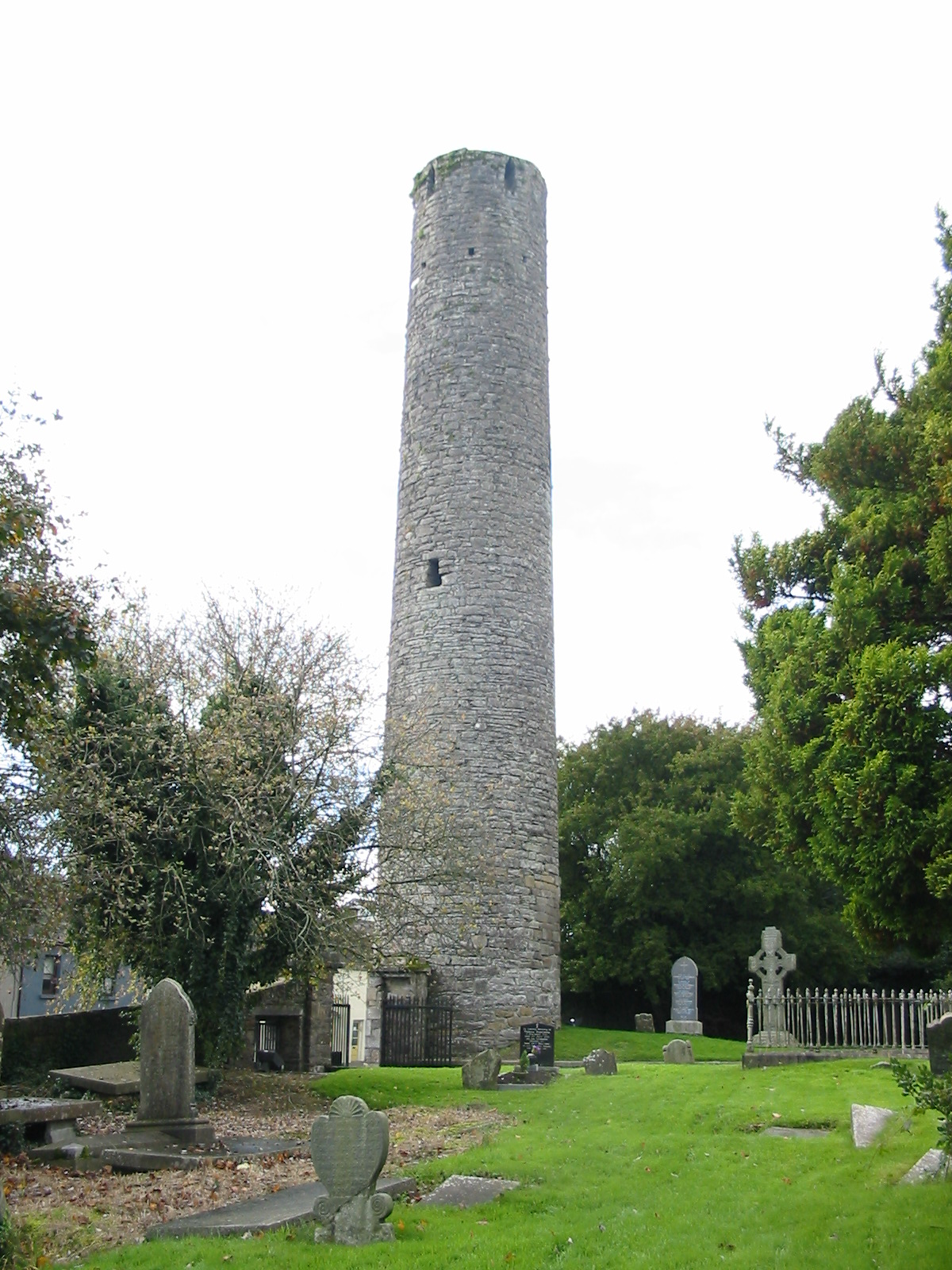
Abbey of Kells, Kells Round Tower dates from the 10th century

Close by the graveyard of St. Columba's church stands a small stone roofed oratory, known as St. Colmcille's House. This probably dates from the 11th century. Access to the monks' sleeping accommodation aloft is by ladder. This small rectangular building is positioned at one of the highest points in the town.

Just outside the town of Kells on the road to Oldcastle is the hill of Lloyd, named after Thomas Lloyd of Enniskillen, who camped a large Williamite army here during the wars of 1688–91 against the Jacobites. Here also stands a 30m high building called the Spire of Lloyd, which is an 18th-century lighthouse folly. The area around the tower has been developed as a community park (the People's Park), and includes the Paupers' Grave. Mass is celebrated there annually, and the cemetery is a reminder of the workhouse and extreme poverty engendered by changes in farming practice in the 19th century and during the Great Famine.

== Population ==
The population of Kells town, as of the 2022 census of Ireland, was 6,608. In the period between the 1996 and 2022 census, the population almost doubled.

Historical population
| Year | Pop. | ±% |
|---|---|---|
| 1813 | 3,344 | — |
| 1821 | 3,618 | +8.2% |
| 1831 | 4,326 | +19.6% |
| 1841 | 4,205 | −2.8% |
| 1851 | 3,660 | −13.0% |
| 1861 | 3,224 | −11.9% |
| 1871 | 2,953 | −8.4% |
| 1881 | 2,822 | −4.4% |
| 1891 | 2,427 | −14.0% |
| 1901 | 2,428 | +0.0% |
| 1911 | 2,395 | −1.4% |
| 1926 | 2,196 | −8.3% |
| 1936 | 2,304 | +4.9% |
| 1946 | 2,143 | −7.0% |
| 1951 | 2,125 | −0.8% |
| 1956 | 2,162 | +1.7% |
| 1961 | 2,193 | +1.4% |
| 1966 | 2,274 | +3.7% |
| 1971 | 2,653 | +16.7% |
| 1981 | 3,663 | +38.1% |
| 1986 | 2,683 | −26.8% |
| 1991 | 3,539 | +31.9% |
| 1996 | 3,542 | +0.1% |
| 2002 | 4,321 | +22.0% |
| 2006 | 5,248 | +21.5% |
| 2011 | 5,888 | +12.2% |
| 2016 | 6,135 | +4.2% |
| 2022 | 6,608 | +7.7% |
CSO.ie and Histpop.org. (Note: For a discussion on the accuracy of pre-famine census returns see Lee, J. J. (1981). "On the accuracy of the pre-famine Irish censuses". In Goldstrom, J.M.; Clarkson, L.A. (eds.). Irish Population, Economy and Society. p. 54. and Mokyr, Joel; Ó Gráda, Cormac (November 1984). "New Developments in Irish Population History, 1700–1850". The Economic History Review. New Series. 37 (4): 473–488. doi:10.2307/2596554. hdl:10197/1406. JSTOR 2596554.)

== Transport ==
=== Roads ===
Until the opening of the new motorway in June 2010, Kells stood as a busy junction town on the old N3 road with over 18,000 vehicles passing through the town each day. Kells was a renowned traffic bottleneck from both the N3 national primary route (Dublin, Cavan, Enniskillen and Ballyshannon) and N52 national secondary route (Dundalk, Tullamore and Nenagh) passing through the town centre. The new M3 motorway (opened June 2010) significantly reduces the journey time to Dublin, as well as the numbers of vehicles in the town.

=== Bus ===
Kells is served by a regular bus service run by Bus Éireann, the 109, 109A and 109X, which takes about 1.5 hours to Busáras in Dublin. In October 2022 Bus Éireann's Dundalk to Ardee route 167 was extended to Mullingar via Kells. There are several services daily in each direction.

=== Railway ===
The original Kells railway station, located on the Oldcastle branch line between Oldcastle and Drogheda via Navan, opened on 11 July 1853. It was closed for passenger traffic on 14 April 1958 and finally for all traffic on 1 April 1963.

"Meath on Track" are seeking reinstatement of the Navan railway link, and on to Dublin.

== Film ==
The Butcher Boy was filmed at Headfort House. Other films set in Kells include the Oscar-nominated animated film The Secret of Kells.

The Hollywood actress Maureen O'Hara was a native of Kells. Her father Charles came from the town, although Maureen grew up in Dublin. Charles was born in a house at the bottom of Farrell Street in the town, a building that now houses a supermarket, carpet shop and apartments. She visited the town on 26 May 2012 to receive the freedom of the town and to unveil a bust in her honour.

== Events ==
From 2014 to 2021, Kells was home to the documentary film festival, the "Guth Gafa International Documentary Film Festival". 2021. Guth Gafa now focuses on impact and outreach screenings of powerful social justice and human rights documentaries

Hay Festival Kells was home to Ireland's only Hay Festival, which later evolved into the current Hinterlands festival.

== Education ==
St. Ciaran's Community School Kells, Navan Road, Kells is a mixed secondary school in Kells which first opened in September 1988 and has around 640 students in attendance. It was first formed by the amalgamation of the Christian Brothers Secondary School and Kells Vocational School.

Eureka secondary school Kells, Navan Road, Kells was first opened by Sisters of Mercy secondary education for girls in Kells in classrooms attached to the Convent in 1924. The school moved to a site at Eureka House in 1956 where it was situated until 2019 before moving to the newly built school campus on Cavan Road.

St. Colmcille's Boys National school is an all-boys school on the Navan Road, first opened by the Christian Brothers on 20 January 1845. The present school was opened in 1976 and the Brothers, because of a fall-off in vocations, withdrew from the school in 1985.

Headfort School is a non-denominational day and boarding private school located just outside the ancient town of Kells.

== Music ==
Songwriters from the area include Jim Connell (b.1852 in Crossakiel) who wrote the Socialist anthem "The Red Flag", and Dick Farrelly (1916–1990), who wrote the "Isle of Innisfree". Other musicians from Kells include Mícheál Ó Domhnaill (1951–2006), who was a member of The Bothy Band, Relativity, and Nightnoise, and Eamon Carr (b.1948), who is the drummer in the band Horslips. Matthew Gilsenan, a member of The Celtic Tenors, is from the area. Irish indie rock bands Ham Sandwich and Turn are also associated with Kells.

== Notable people ==
- Xabi Alonso, Spanish World Cup winning footballer spent time here learning English in a school exchange programme when he was a teenager
- Thomas Betagh (1737–1811), Jesuit priest and educationist was born and bred in Kells.
- Ray Butler, Fine Gael politician
- Myles Dungan, broadcaster, historian and journalist is from Kells.
- Alice Stopford Green (1847–1929), Irish historian and nationalist.
- Denis Hurley, rugby player, was born and bred in Kells.
- Damien McGrane (born 1971), professional golfer is a Kells man.

== See also ==
- List of towns and villages in the Republic of Ireland
- Market Houses in the Republic of Ireland
- North Meath RFC
