= Mick O'Brien (Gaelic footballer) =

Irish Gaelic football coach and player (1942–2026)

Personal information
- Native name: Mícheál Ó Briain (Irish)
- Born: 13 December 1942 Johnstown, County Meath, Ireland
- Died: 28 April 2026 (aged 83) Drogheda, County Louth, Ireland
- Occupation: Primary school teacher

Sport
- Sport: Gaelic football
- Position: Right corner-forward
Club
- Years: Club
- Walterstown
Club titles
- Meath titles: 0
College
- Years: College
- St Patrick's College, Dublin
College titles
- Sigerson titles: 0
Inter-county
- Years: County
- 1966-1967: Meath
Inter-county titles
- Leinster titles: 2
- All-Irelands: 1
- NFL: 0

Michael O'Brien (13 December 1942 – 28 April 2026) was an Irish Gaelic football coach, player and administrator. At club level, he played with Walterstown and at inter-county level was a member of the Meath senior football team.

== Playing career ==
O'Brien attended St Finian's College in Mullingar and played in all grades of Gaelic football during hs time there. He won a Leinster Colleges SFC medal, before a 3–10 to 3–07 defeat by St Jarlath's College in the 1960 All-Ireland Colleges SFC final. O'Brien later attended St Patrick's College and qualified as a teacher.

At club level, O'Brien played juvenile nad underage Gaelic football with De La Salle in Navan. He progressed to adult level with Walterstown and won a Meath JFC medal in 1961. O'Brien added a Meath IFC medal to his collection in 1964, before ending his career with a second Meath JFC title in 1978.

O'Brien first appeared on the inter-county scene for Meath as a member of the junior team. He won Leinster JFC medals in 1962 and 1964, but missed out on All-Ireland JFC honours after being called up to the senior team. O'Brien won consecutive Leinster SFC medals and was a non-playing substitute when Meath beat Cork by 1–09 to 0–09 in the 1967 All-Ireland SFC final.]

== Coaching career ==
O'Brien was heavily involved in the establishment of a juvenile section of the Walterstown club in 1964. He later trained the Walterstown senior team to five Meath SFC titles between 1978 and 1988. Two of these victories were subsequently converted into Leinster Club SFC titles, while Walterstown also had All-Ireland Club SFC final defeats in 1981 and 1984.

At inter-county level, O'Brien was a selector with the Meath minor team when they won the All-Ireland MFC title in 1972. He later coached the senior team to the National Football League title in 1975. O'Brien also trained the junior team to the All-Ireland JFC title in 1988.

== Death ==
O'Brien died in Our Lady of Lourdes Hospital in Drogheda on 28 April 2026, at the age of 83.

== Honours ==
=== Player ===
St Finian's College

- Leinster Colleges Senior Football Championship (1): 1960

Walterstown

- Meath Intermediate Football Championship (1): 1964
- Meath Junior Football Championship (2): 1961, 1978

Meath

- All-Ireland Senior Football Championship (1): 1967
- Leinster Senior Football Championship (2): 1966, 1967
- Leinster Junior Football Championship (2): 1962, 1964

=== Management ===
Walterstown

- Leinster Senior Club Football Championship (2): 1980, 1983
- Meath Senior Football Championship (5): 1978, 1980, 1982, 1983, 1984
- Meath Junior Football Championship (1): 1961

Meath

- National Football League (1): 1974–75
- All-Ireland Junior Football Championship (1): 1988
- Leinster Junior Football Championship (1): 1988
- All-Ireland Minor Football Championship (1): 1972
- Leinster Minor Football Championship (1): 1972
