= 2026 in Ireland =

- Centuries: 19th; 20th; 21st
- Decades: 2000s; 2010s; 2020s
- See also: 2026 in Northern Ireland; Other events of 2026; List of years in Ireland

Events during the year 2026 in Ireland.

== Incumbents ==
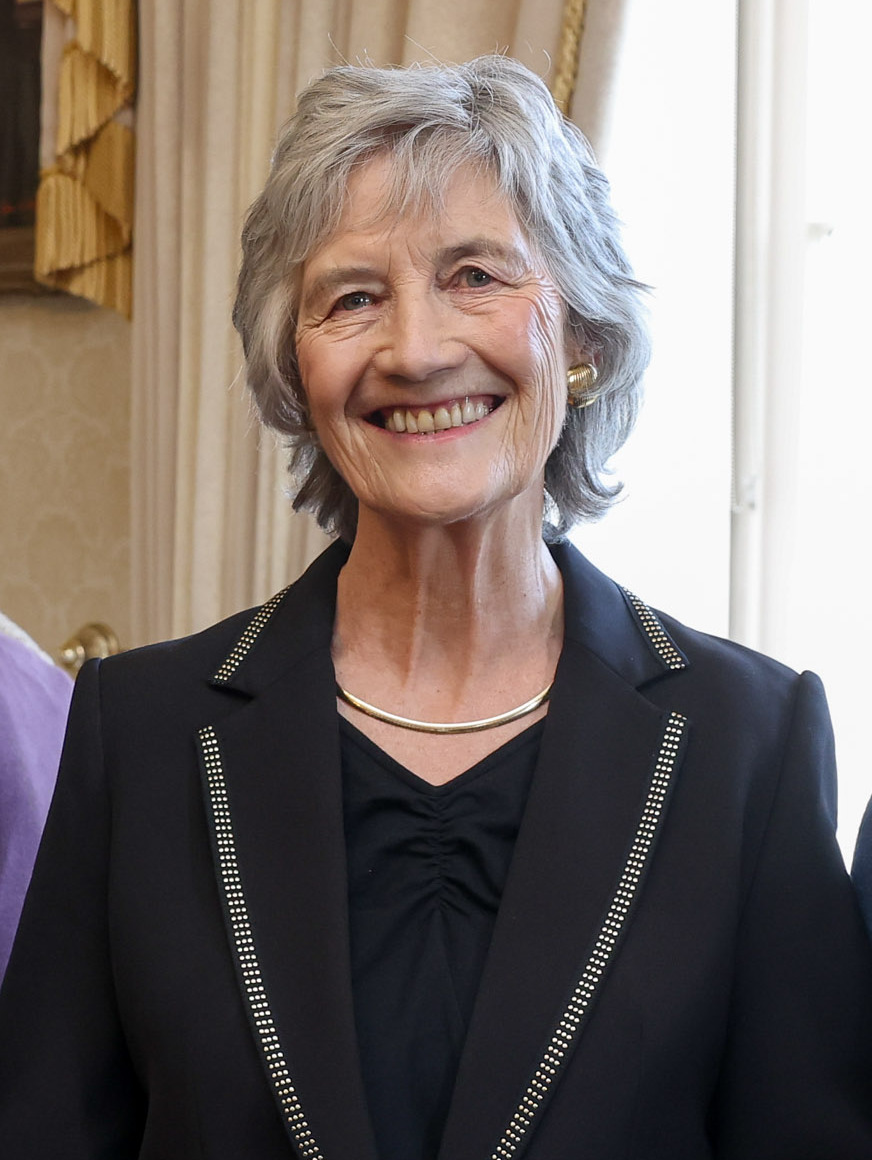
President Catherine Connolly

- President: Catherine Connolly
- Taoiseach: Micheál Martin (FF)
- Tánaiste: Simon Harris (FG)
- Minister for Finance: Simon Harris (FG)
- Chief Justice: Donal O'Donnell
- Dáil Éireann: 34th
- Seanad Éireann: 27th

== Events ==
=== January ===
- 1 January – Pension auto-enrolment commenced for employees between the ages of 23 and 60, earning over €20,000, and not already in a pension scheme.
- 5 January – The taoiseach, Micheál Martin, met Chinese president Xi Jinping in the Great Hall of the People on Tiananmen Square, Beijing. The taoiseach then received a personal tour of the Forbidden City, which was closed to visitors that day.
- 7 January
  - The president, Catherine Connolly, referenced the United Nations Secretary-General as she urged "full respect for international law, including the United Nations Charter" while noting that discussion of the United States attack on Caracas, during which President Maduro and his wife were seized and transported to Manhattan, "often overlook[s]" the "appalling" death toll (100+) the country experienced that night.
  - Responding to Donald Trump's remarks about the US assuming control of Greenland, the taoiseach, Micheál Martin, said the European Union was "rock-solid behind Denmark" and described the island as "part of Denmark", while the minister for foreign affairs, Helen McEntee, said Greenland was "not for sale... not for taking".
- 9 January – The Department of Foreign Affairs announced that 12,904 passports issued in late December and early January would be reissued, because a technical error caused them not to be fully compliant with international travel standards.
- 13 January – The accreditation ceremony at Áras an Uachtaráin this morning for the new Iranian ambassador, Eshagh Al Habib, was postponed by the Department of Foreign Affairs because of the continuing upheaval in Iran.
- 24 January – A teenage girl, later identified as Grace Lynch, was knocked down by a scrambler bike and later died in hospital from her injuries.

=== February ===
- 4 February – Taoiseach Micheál Martin confirmed government plans for Grace's Law, a planned ban on the use of scrambler bikes in public places, following the death of Grace Lynch.
- 6 February – It was announced that the buried remains of a further 22 infants have been uncovered at the site of the former Bon Secours Mother and Baby Home in Tuam, County Galway.
- 11 February – Culture Minister Patrick O'Donovan announced the Basic Income for the Arts scheme that will see 2,000 eligible artists paid €325 a week by the Government to support them in their endeavours. Applications will open in May with the payment lasting three years.

=== March ===
- 7 March – Former president Mary Robinson said the airstrikes against Iran were "illegal and breach international law" while attending a rally in Belfast for International Women's Day.
- 12 March – £937m of Irish investment in the UK was announced ahead of a UK–Ireland summit.
- 13 March – UK Prime Minister Keir Starmer held a summit with Taoiseach Micheál Martin in Cork, where he said the Iran war had increased the importance of good relations between the UK and Ireland.
- 17 March – During his annual visit to Washington for Saint Patrick's Day, Taoiseach Micheál Martin met US President Donald Trump in the Oval Office and thanked him for "affirming the tremendous bonds" between Ireland and the US.
- 25 March – Due to the 2026 Iran war which resulted in soaring fuel prices, the Government cut taxes on both diesel and petrol, with excise duty on a litre of diesel reduced by 20 cents, with a 15 cents drop for petrol until the end of May.

=== April ===
- 7 April – Farmers began a blockade of major roads and oil refineries across the country in response to soaring fuel prices and wider government mismanagement.
- 10 April – It was announced that the remains of a further 36 infants have been uncovered at the site of the former Bon Secours Mother and Baby Home at Tuam, County Galway.
- 11 April – Fuel tankers regained access to Whitegate refinery in County Cork following a joint operation between gardaí and the defence forces to disperse protesters.
- 12 April – The government announced a package worth €505m to support those "most impacted" by rising fuel costs.
- 14 April
  - Just prior to the vote on the motion of confidence in the government, Micheal Healy-Rae resigned as Minister of State at the Department of Agriculture, Food and the Marine, saying that the Taoiseach's speech was "not understanding" and that "the government have lost the people".
  - A motion of confidence in the government in response to the handling of the fuel crisis and blockades by farmers succeeds by a vote of 92–78, with just two TDs having changed their vote since the initial formation of the government, these being the two Healy-Rae brothers.
- 15 April – The suspected leader of the Kinahan Organised Crime Group, Daniel Kinahan, was arrested in Dubai. The Irish courts had issued an arrest warrant for Kinahan for alleged serious crimes. His extradition to Ireland was expected to follow.
- 19 April – Aer Lingus announced that a number of flights had been cancelled from its summer schedule because of what it described as "mandatory maintenance on aircraft".
- 29 April – The government announced further fuel support for workers and businesses.

=== May ===
- 12 May – Lidl supermarket recalled two of its branded Irish chicken breast products amid salmonella concerns.
- 15 May – Yves Sakila, a Congolese national, died after being restrained by security guards outside a department store on Henry Street, Dublin.
- 18 May – During a meeting at Buckingham Palace, King Charles III accepted an invitation from President Catherine Connolly to make a state visit to Ireland.
- 20 May – The former teacher Enoch Burke was dismissed from Wilson's Hospital School in County Westmeath following four years of legal wrangling. Burke appeared in court by video link from Castlerea Prison and said he was "still an employee of Wilson’s Hospital School".
- 22 May – In a pair of by-elections, Daniel Ennis of the Social Democrats won in Dublin Central, and Seán Kyne of Fine Gael won in Galway West, only the fourth time in 44 years that a member of a governing political party was victorious.
- 25 May – Ireland's warmest May day was recorded, with a high of 28.6 °C at Shannon Airport in County Clare.
- 26 May – Met Éireann confirmed another temperature record had been set after 30.6 °C was recorded at Shannon Airport.

=== June ===
- 5 June – Ireland prohibited the Israeli national security minister Itamar Ben Gvir and the finance minister Bezalel Smotrich from entering Ireland, citing behaviour against 2026 Global Sumud Flotilla activists and anti-Palestinian statements.
- 13 June – Canadian Prime Minister Mark Carney arrived in Dublin for a visit to Ireland, where he met with Taoiseach Micheál Martin.
- 14 June – Mark Carney met President Catherine Connolly at Westport House before travelling to the village of Aughagower in County Mayo, from where his grandparents emigrated to Canada.
- 17 June – The Dáil voted 86–70 to remove the mandatory three-day wait for an abortion in Ireland.
- 23 June – The Government announced it would contribute €228m (£197m) towards improving rail services between Northern Ireland and the Republic of Ireland.
- 24 June – The Oireachtas Committee on Drugs published a report recommending the possession of all drugs for personal use be decriminalised.
- 25 June – During the on-going 2026 European heatwaves, a highest recorded temperature of 32.1C was recorded at a weather station in Athenry, Co Galway.

=== July ===
- 1 July – A ceremony in Dublin Castle was held to mark the start of Ireland taking over the Presidency of the Council of the European Union for the next six months.
- 5 July – A man was killed in a crash at the Skerries 100 motorcycle race.
- 6 July – Following a trial at Dublin's Central Criminal Court, George Gibney, a former Irish national swimming coach, was convicted of sexually abusing four young female athletes and the attempted rape of one of the girls in the 1970s and 1980s.
- 7 July – Sinn Féin brought forward laws for a Citizens' Assembly on a United Ireland.
- 10 July – A heatwave was officially declared in Ireland after temperatures of 25°C were recorded for five days in a row at Oak Park, County Carlow.
- 20 July – The Government agreed proposals, to take effect in August, to ban electric scooter use by anyone under 18. Riders will be legally obliged to wear hi-visibility jackets and helmets. Legislation will follow to require licensing and registration of e-scooters and to ban their sale to minors. The taoiseach, Micheál Martin, said that a complete ban on such scooters remains possible.
- 22 July
  - Experts excavating the site of the former Bon Secours Mother and Baby Home in Tuam, County Galway, announced the discovery of a further 22 set of infant remains, bringing to 99 the total found so far.
  - Gardaí intercepted a car at Carrickmacross, County Monaghan containing a bomb that they suspected was destined for use by dissident republicans in Northern Ireland.
- 24 July – A 25-year-old woman was remanded pending a bail hearing by Trim District Court in connection with the discovery of a bomb in a car in County Monaghan. She was granted bail four days later.
- 25 July – A man was charged in connection with the discovery of a bomb in a car in County Monaghan.
- 29 July – Musician Glen Hansard was killed in a motorcycle crash in Dublin.

=== August ===
- 7 August – The UK's Intellectual Property Office ruled that Galway-based Supermac's could register its name in the UK without creating confusion with brands sold by McDonald's.
- 9 August
  - Suspected crime boss Daniel Kinahan, one of the world's most wanted men, arrived in Ireland after being extradited from Dubai.
  - Nine people were injured in a two-car collision on the M50 in Dublin that involved a car travelling northbound on the southbound carriageway. Eight male teenagers were in the car, which collided with another car being driven by a man in his early 20s. Two were in a critical condition.
- 10 August – Fiosrú – the Office of the Police Ombudsman began investigating the previous day's crash on the M50 after one of the vehicles involved had been reported stolen prior to the collision.
- 11 August – A man was airlifted to Cork University Hospital after being bitten by a blue shark while part of a team tagging sharks for research purposes.
- 12 August – A partial eclipse of the sun (magnitude 0.945) darkened the sky across Ireland. In Dublin, the event lasted one hour and 52 minutes. It began at 6.12 pm; the maximum was at 7.10 pm when 94.5% of the sun's disc was covered by the moon, the sun was in the west at 275° at an altitude of 14.7° above the horizon; and it ended at 8.05 pm.
- 16 August – Five teenage males were killed and a further four people injured, two of them seriously, following a two-vehicle collision on the M9 motorway in County Kildare, involving a stolen BMW driving on the wrong side of the carriageway.
- 17 August – Taoiseach Micheál Martin condemned the previous day's crash as being the result of "an irresponsible and dangerous act". Minister for Justice Jim O'Callaghan condemned it as "outrageously dangerous criminal behaviour" the "reckless" driving which caused the crash, while confirming legislation was being prepared to strengthen Garda protections regarding pursuit. The Garda Representative Association had said no member of An Garda Síochána had received pursuit training.
- 18 August – Westmeath Rose Caoilfhinn Ní Choiligh won the 2026 Rose of Tralee festival, becoming the second Rose from Westmeath to win.

=== September ===
- 2 September – At a hearing at Belfast Crown Court, Darren James Service pleaded guilty to charges relating to a Loyalist bomb hoax targeting former Foreign Affairs Minister Simon Coveney.
- 8 September
  - Ireland sanctioned products from Israeli settlements in the West Bank.
  - After four years' work, the former President of Ireland, Mary McAleese, resigned from her role as chair of the Integration Committee overseeing the amalgamation of the Gaelic Football Association, the Ladies' Gaelic Football Association, and the Camogie Association. McAleese stated: "I suspect that there are people who are not entirely happy about the idea of including women in decision-making at the top level of Gaelic sports."
- 12 September – The president of the United States, Donald Trump, began a two-day visit to Ireland in order to attend a golf tournament. After brief courtesy meetings with the Irish president, Catherine Connolly, and Micheál Martin, the taoiseach, Trump left to watch the Irish Open in Doonbeg, County Clare. Public protests took place in Dublin, Shannon Airport, and Doonbeg.
- 16 September
  - President Catherine Connolly met First Minister John Swinney at the beginning of a four-day visit to Scotland.
  - Independent TD Michael Healy-Rae sustained injuries during an incident in which his car was stopped and he was assaulted while driving through central Dublin.
- 18 September – Taoiseach Micheál Martin met UK Prime Minister Andy Burnham for talks at Number 10 North in Manchester.

=== October ===
- 6 October – The 2027 Irish budget was presented by the Minister for Finance Simon Harris and the Minister for Public Expenditure Jack Chambers.
- 13 October – Gardaí launched a murder investigation following the deaths of a couple and two of their children in a housefire in Waterford City; the couple's remaining two children were taken hospital in critical condition.
- 14 October – Over 300,000 public sector workers, including teachers, nurses and civil servants, engaged in a 24 hour strike over delays in agreeing a new public sector pay deal. It was the largest strike staged in Ireland in almost 20 years.
- 15–16 October – President Catherine Connolly met with the Arraiolos Group consisting of 12 non-executive European presidents in Ljubljana, Slovenia. The attendees were presidents of Austria, Estonia, Germany, Greece, Hungary, Ireland, Italy, Latvia, Malta, Portugal, Slovakia and Slovenia.
- 30 October – The former president of Ireland, Mary Robinson, was elected president of the assembly and chair of the Global Green Growth Institute (GGGI), replacing the former United Nations secretary-general and GGGI president and chair, Ban Ki-moon. She will assume the position in 2027, for two years. The GGGI helps developing countries to attract investment to build environmentally sustainable economies and to deal with climate change. Robinson has long been committed to developing climate justice.

=== November ===
- 6 October – A series of bomb threats forced the immediate evacuation of public broadcaster RTÉ including other media organisations.
- 10 November – Milk was thrown by pro-Palestinian protesters at former US president, Joe Biden, during his surprise visit to Trinity College Dublin.
- 12 November – The 9th European Political Community Summit was held in the Convention Centre Dublin and was hosted by Taoiseach Micheál Martin.
- 13 November – A crude explosive device at a central Dublin office building was neutralized by military bomb specialists.

== Arts and sciences ==
- 11 January – Irish actress Jessie Buckley won her first Golden Globe award at a ceremony in Beverly Hills, California for her performance in the film Hamnet.
- 15 March – Jessie Buckley became the first Irishwoman to win an Oscar award for best actress at a ceremony in Hollywood, California for her role in the film Hamnet.
- 28 August – 31 August – The annual arts-and-music festival, Electric Picnic took place at Stradbally Hall in Stradbally, County Laois. More than 800 performances took place; headliners were Sombr, Zara Larsson, Lewis Capaldi, Gorillaz, and Fontaines D.C. with an attendance of 80,000 people.
- 17 September – RTÉ confirmed it would boycott the 2027 Eurovision Song Contest due to Israel's participation, the second occasion on which it withdrew from the contest.

== Sport ==
=== Association football (men) ===
==== International friendly matches ====
- 31 March – Ireland 0–0 North Macedonia.
- 16 May – Grenada 0–5 Ireland.
- 28 May – Ireland 1–0 Qatar.
- 5 June – Canada 1–1 Ireland.

==== 2026 World Cup qualification ====
Play-off semi-final

- 26 March – Czech Republic 2–2, 4–3 pso. Ireland.

==== Nations League ====
Group B3

- 24 September – Kosovo 1–0 Ireland.
- 27 September – Israel 0–3 Ireland.
- 1 October – Ireland 2–2 Austria.
- 4 October – Ireland 1–1 Israel.
- 14 November – Austria 1–0 Ireland.
- 17 November – Ireland 3–0 Kosovo.

=== Association football (women) ===
2027 World Cup Qualification

- 3 March – Ireland 1–2 France.
- 7 March – Netherlands 2–1 Ireland.
- 14 April – Poland 2–3 Ireland.
- 18 April – Ireland 1–0 Poland.
- 5 June – Ireland 3–2 Netherlands.
- 9 June – France 1–0 Ireland.

World Cup qualification – UEFA play-offs

Play-off round 1:

- 9 October – Kazakhstan 0–8 Ireland.
- 13 October – Ireland 4–0 Kazakhstan.

Play-off round 2:

- 1 December – Poland v Ireland.
- 5 December – Ireland v Poland.

=== Boxing ===
- 5 September – In the final fight of her boxing career, Katie Taylor defeated Flora Pili by unanimous decision in front of 82,000 fans at Croke Park in Dublin.

=== Camogie ===
All-Ireland camogie final:

- 9 August – Cork beat Galway and lifted the O'Duffy Cup in Croke Park, Dublin.
  Result: Galway 0–19 to 2–14 Cork.

=== Gaelic football ===
2026 All-Ireland Senior Football Championship:

- 26 July – Mayo beat Kerry and lifted the Sam Maguire Cup in Croke Park, Dublin. Score: Kerry 1–17 to 1–20 Mayo.

=== Hurling ===
2026 All-Ireland Senior Hurling Championship

- 19 July – Limerick beat Galway and lifted the Liam MacCarthy Cup in Croke Park, Dublin. Score: Galway 1–18 to 1–29 Limerick.

=== Rugby (men) ===
Six Nations Championship

- 5 February – France 36–14 Ireland.
- 14 February – Ireland 20–13 Italy.
- 21 February – England 21–42 Ireland.
- 6 March – Ireland 27–17 Wales.
- 14 March – Ireland 43–21 Scotland. This was Ireland's 15th Triple Crown win, having defeated England, Scotland, and Wales.

2026 Nations Championship Northern Hemisphere Series

- 14 November – Ireland 43–15 Fiji.

=== Rugby (women) ===
Six Nations Championship

- 11 April – England 33–12 Ireland.
- 18 April – Ireland 57–20 Italy.
- 25 April – France 26–7 Ireland.
- 9 May – Ireland 33–12 Wales.
- 17 May – Ireland 54–5 Scotland.

== Annual events ==
(H) = public holiday

=== January ===
- 1 January – New Year's Day. (H)
- 6 January – Nollaig na mBan.

=== February ===
- 1 February – Imbolc.
- 2 February – Saint Brigid's holiday. (H)
- 19 February–March 1 – Dublin International Film Festival

=== March ===
- 17 March – Saint Patrick's Day. (H)
- 20 March – Spring equinox.

=== April ===
- 6 April – Easter Monday. (H)

=== May ===
- 1 May – Bealtaine.
- 4 May – May holiday. (H)

=== June ===
- June – Pride Month.
- 1 June – June holiday. (H)
- 16 June – Bloomsday.
- 21 June – Summer solstice.

=== August ===
- 1 August – Lúnasa.
- 3 August – August holiday. (H)

=== September ===
- 23 September – Autumn equinox.

=== October ===
- 25 October – October holiday. (H)
- 31 October – Hallowe'en.

=== November ===
- 1 November – Samhain.

=== December ===
- 21 December – Winter solstice.
- 25 December – Christmas Day. (H)
- 26 December – Saint Stephen's Day, also Lá an Dreoilín. (H)

== Deaths ==
=== January ===
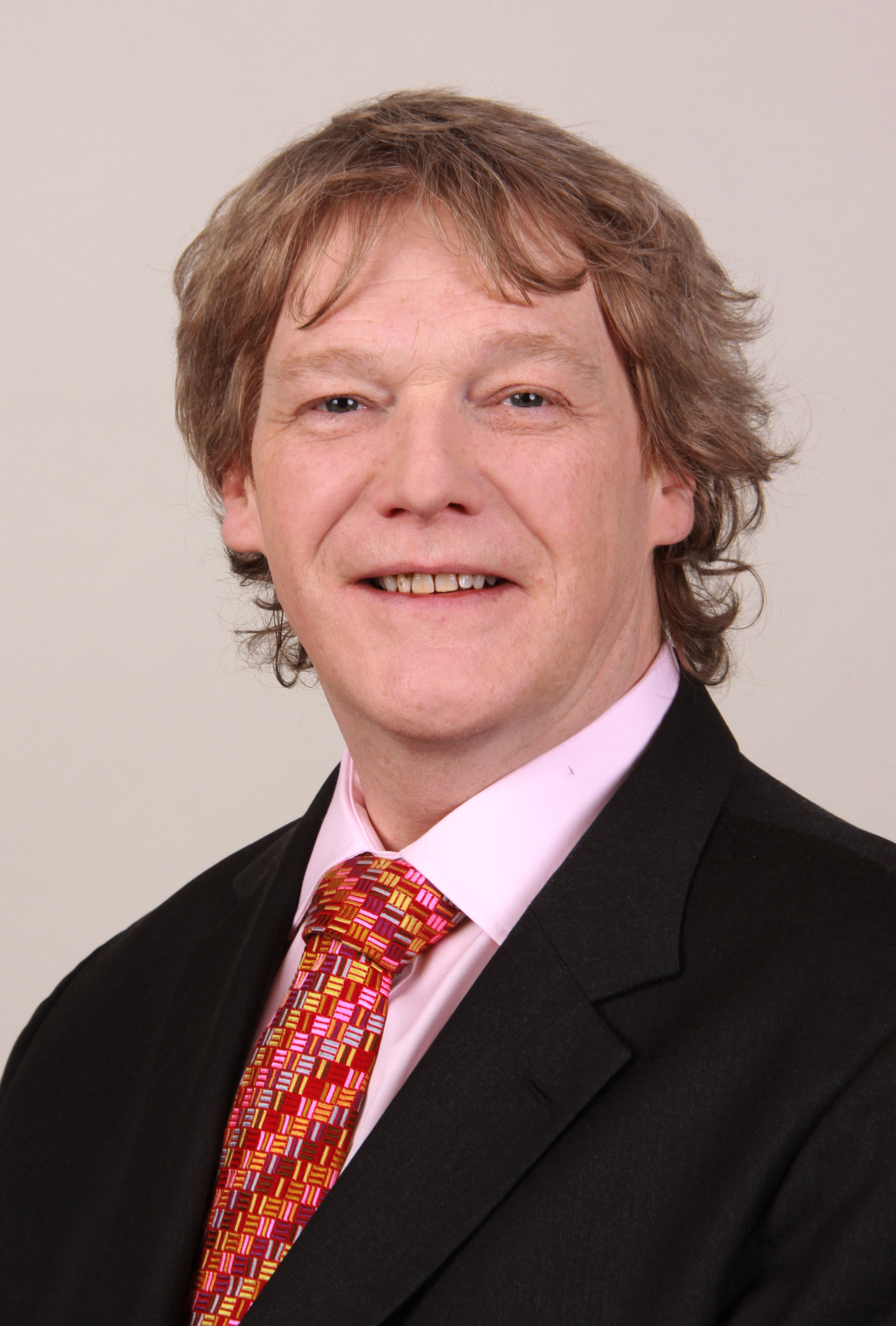
Brian Crowley

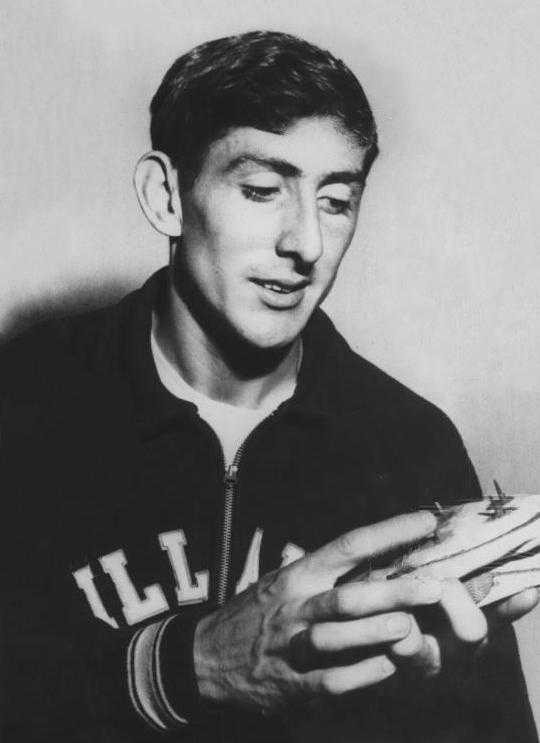
Ronnie Delany

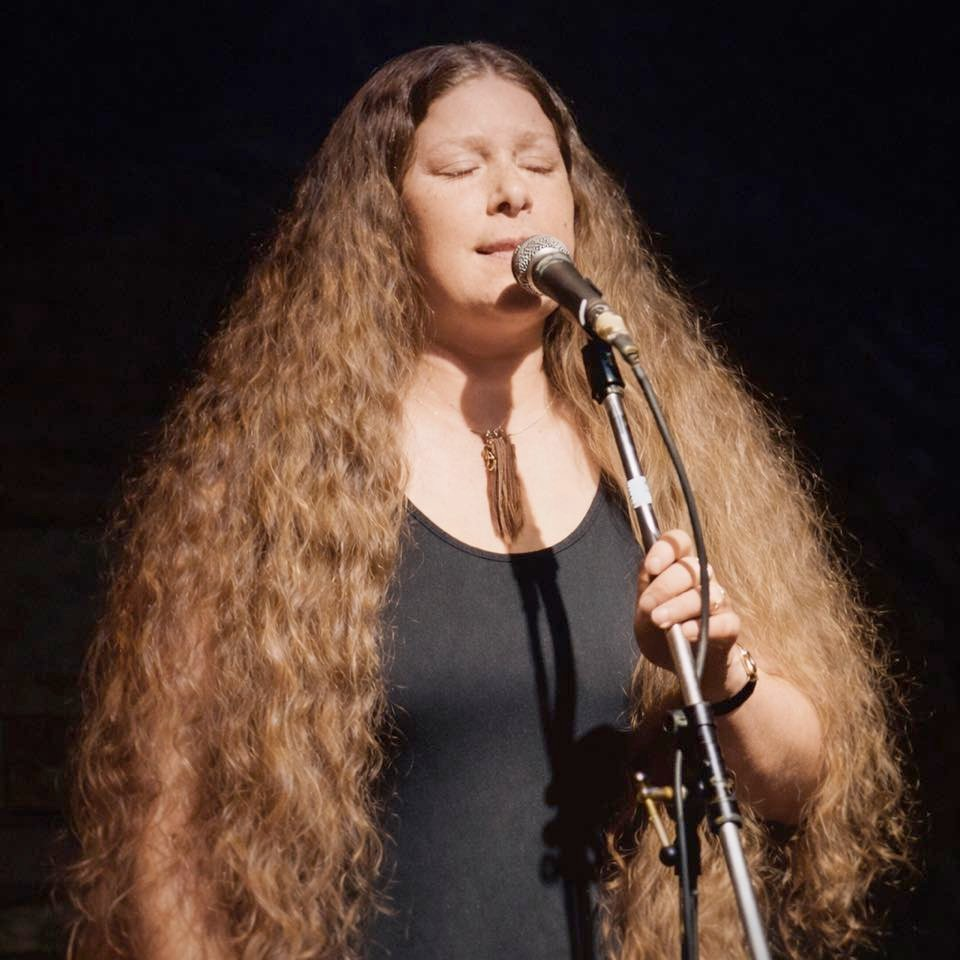
Dolores Keane

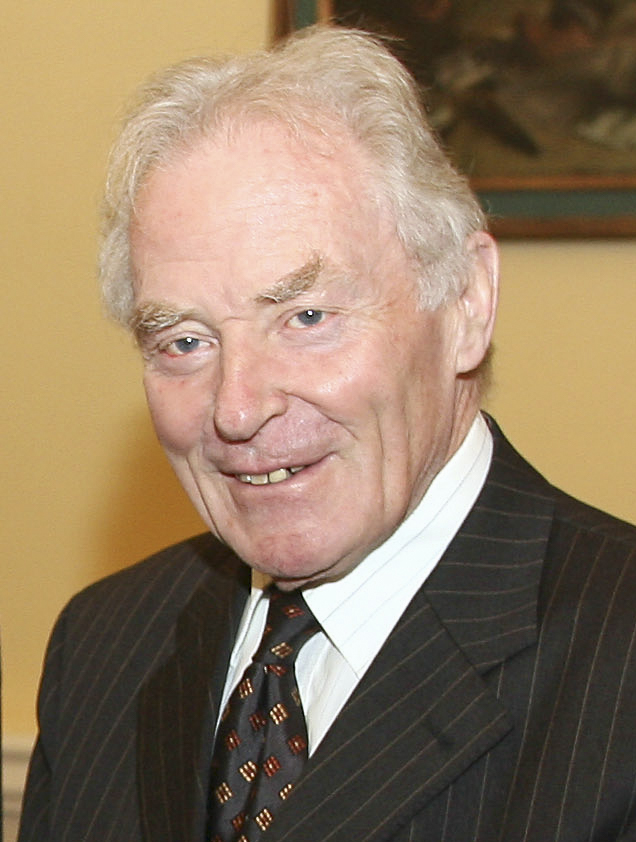
Rory O'Hanlon

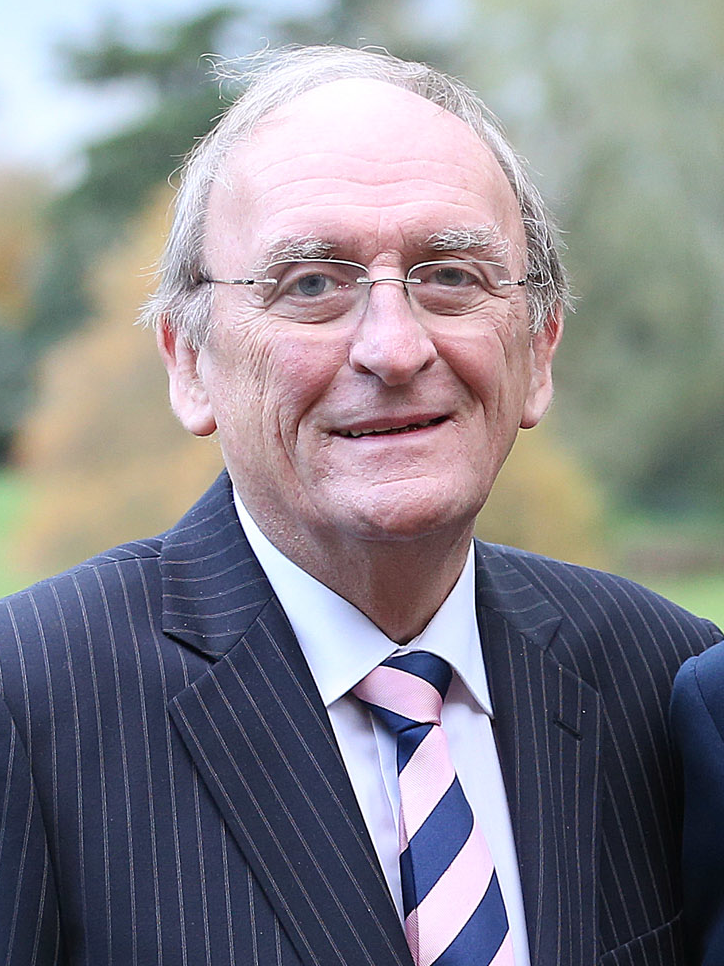
Seán Barrett

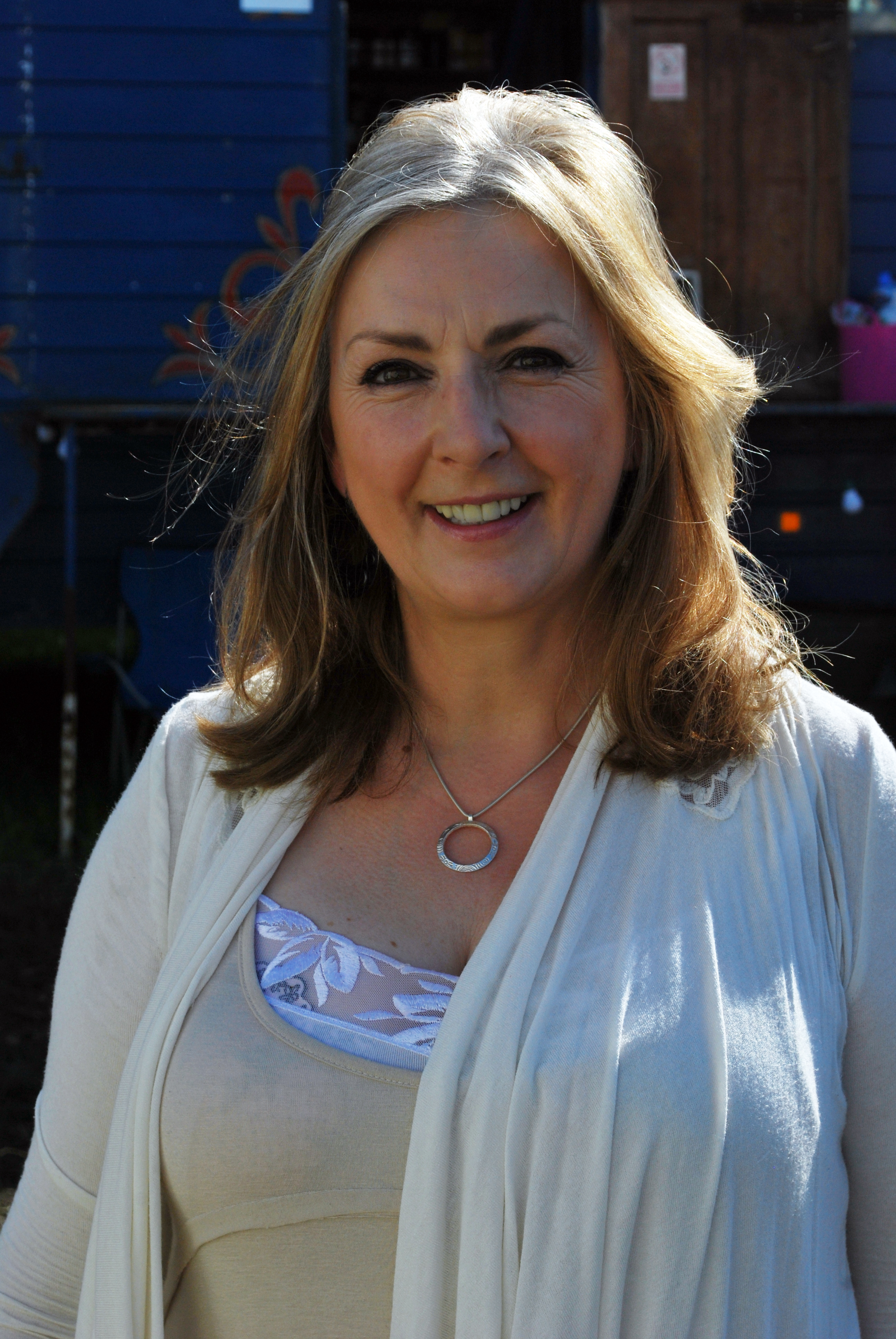
Moya Brennan

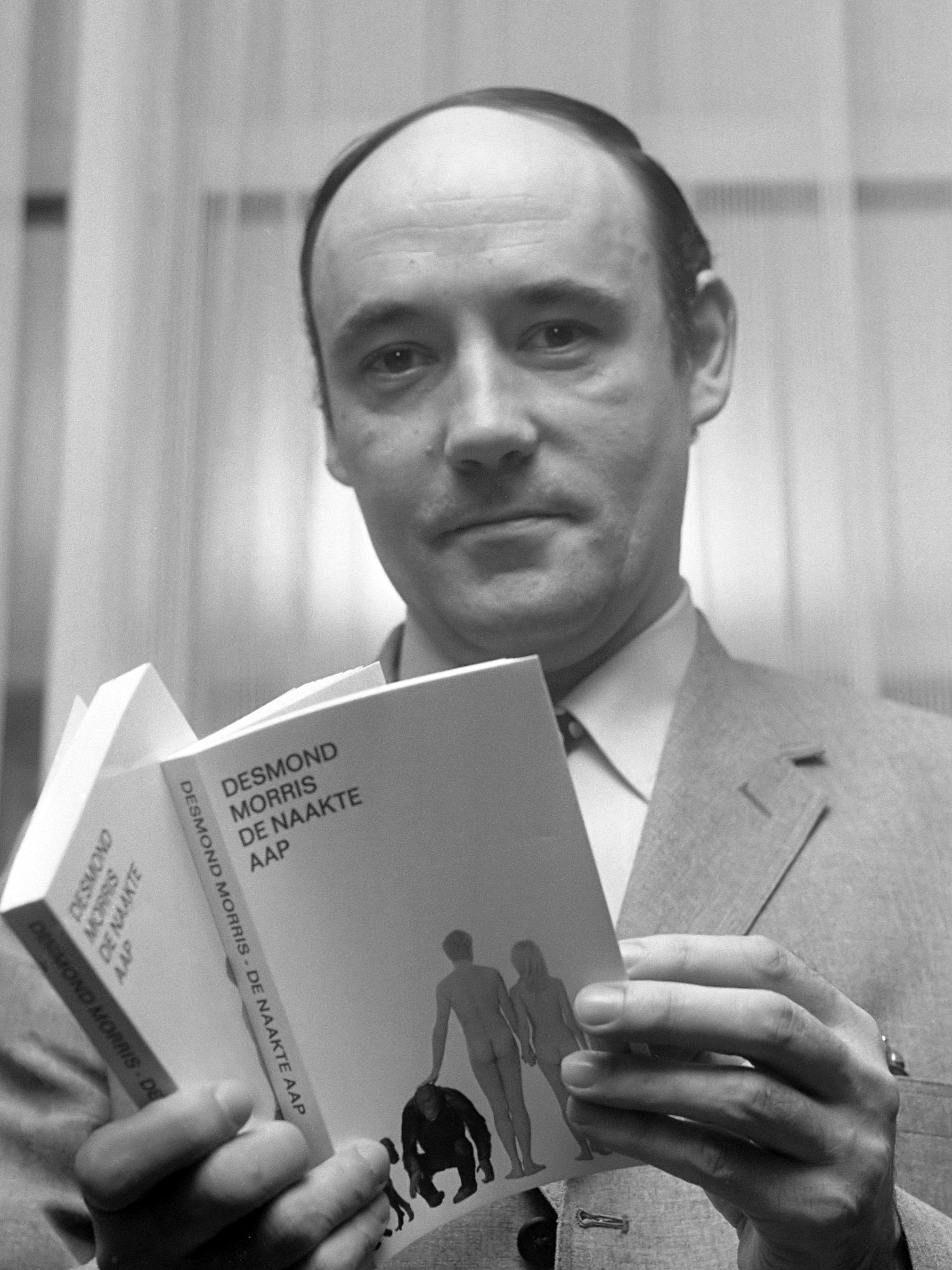
Desmond Morris

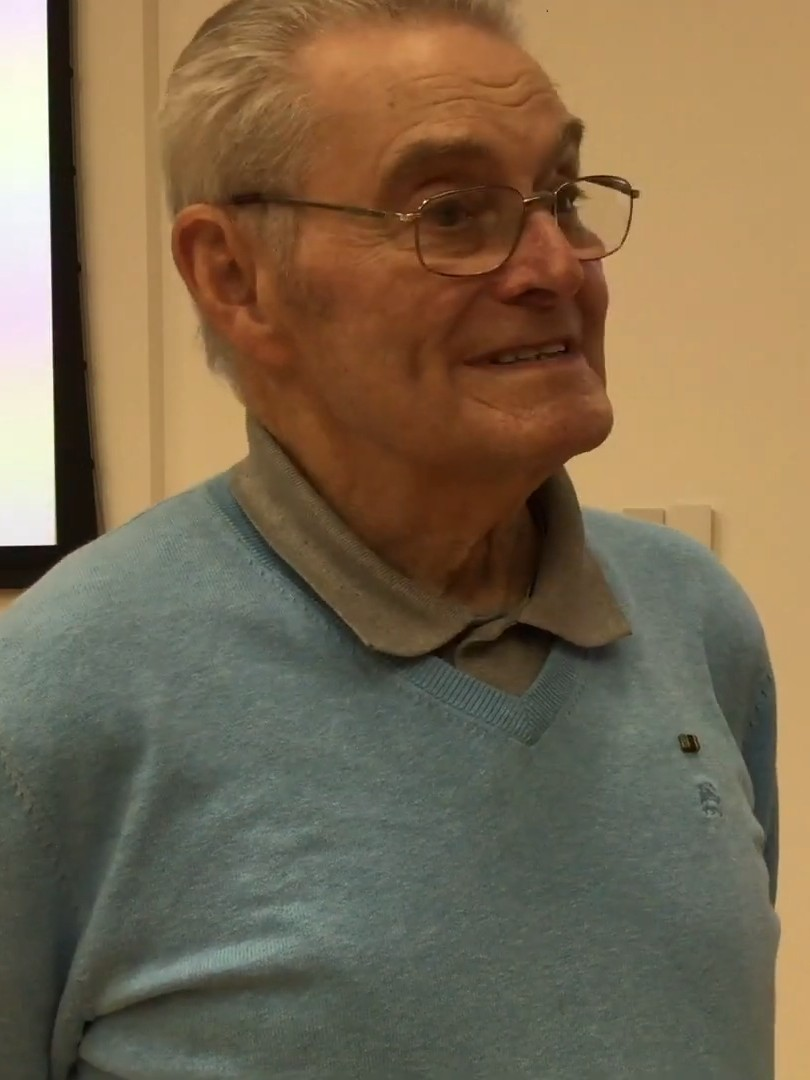
Tomi Reichental

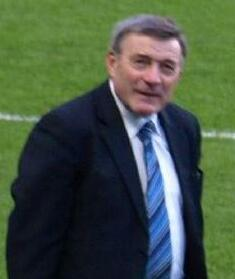
Bobby Tambling

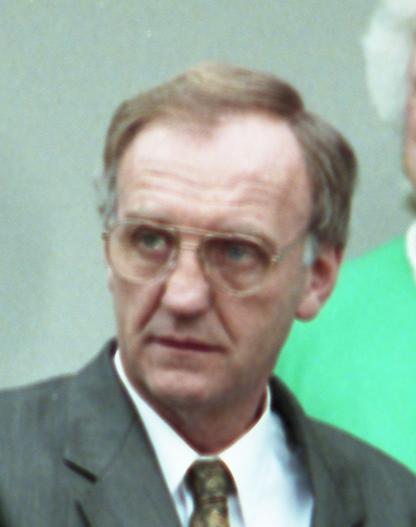
David Andrews

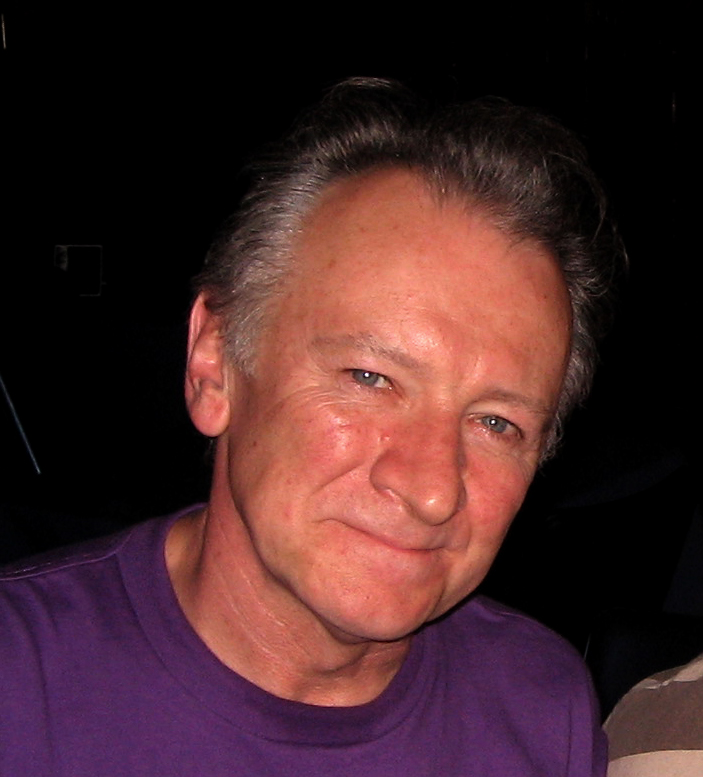
Dónal Lunny

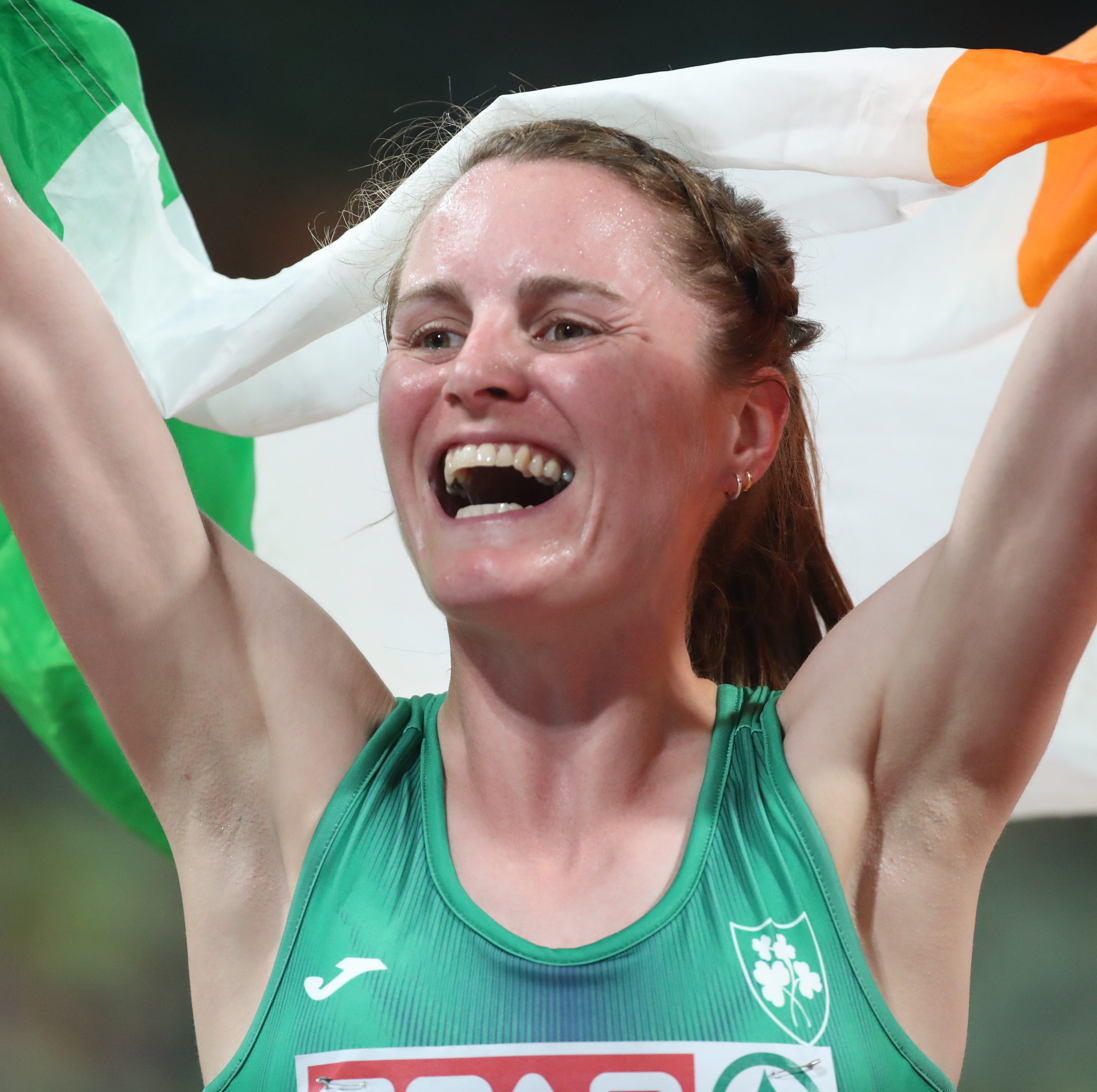
Ciara Mageean

- 3 January – Pa O'Dwyer, 40, strongman.
- 4 January – Mary White, 81, politician, senator (2002–2016).
- 13 January – Seán Ó Sé, 89, singer, educator and raconteur.
- 23 January – Brian Crowley, 61, politician, senator (1993–1994) and MEP (1994–2019).
- 28 January – Brian O'Shea, 81, politician, senator (1987–1989), TD (1989–2011) and Minister of State (1993–1994 and 1994–1997).
- 30 January
  - Geraldine Barniville, 83, squash and tennis player.
  - John Heneghan, 79, Gaelic footballer (Ballymahon, Naomh Mhuire, Longford senior team, Leinster).
- 31 January – Joe Mulholland, 85, managing director of RTÉ Television.

=== February ===
- 6 February – Damien Byrne, 71, footballer (Drogheda, Shamrock Rovers, St Patrick's Athletic).
- 11 February – Eddie Harty, 88, Olympic equestrian (1960) and National Hunt jockey.
- 16 February – Jim Lane, 87, Irish republican and socialist.

=== March ===
- 11 March – Ronnie Delany, 91, runner, Olympic champion (1956).
- 12 March – Kevin Kiely, 64, politician, councillor (1985–1991 and 2004–2014) and Mayor of Limerick (2009–2010).
- 16 March – Dolores Keane, 72, folk singer (De Dannan).
- 20 March – Ben Keaton, 69, actor (Emmerdale, Casualty, Father Ted).
- 22 March – Michael Lyster, 71, broadcaster (The Sunday Game).
- 30 March – Christopher Haskins, 88, businessman and life peer, member of the House of Lords (1998–2020).
- 31 March – Rory O'Hanlon, 92, politician, TD (1977–2011), Minister for Health (1987–1991) and Ceann Comhairle (2007–2011).

=== April ===
- 3 April – Dennis Campbell Kennedy, 89, journalist and historian (Irish Times). Born in Northern Ireland.
- 6 April
  - Seán Barrett, 81, politician, TD (1981–2002 and 2002–2020), Minister for Defence (1995–1997) and Ceann Comhairle (2011–2016).
  - Gabriel Rosenstock, 76, writer and poet.
- 7 April
  - Seán Ó Laoire, 79, architect and urban designer.
  - Michael Patrick, 35, actor (My Left Nut). Born in Northern Ireland.
- 11 April – Murt Duggan, 84, hurler (Gortnahoe–Glengoole, Ballingarry) and selector (Tipperary senior team).
- 13 April
  - Moya Brennan, 73, folk singer (Clannad).
  - Patrick Campbell-Lyons, 82, composer and musician (Nirvana).
- 19 April – Desmond Morris, 98, zoologist, ethologist and surrealist painter. Born in England.
- 26 April – Liam Browne, 89, racehorse trainer. (death announced on this date)
- 27 April – Donal Counihan, 84, politician, councillor (1979–1991 and 1999–2009) and Lord Mayor of Cork (2007–2008).
- 28 April – Mick O'Brien, 83, Gaelic footballer (Walterstown, Meath senior team).
- 29 April – Gordon Snell, 93, children's authour and scriptwriter. Born in British Malaya.
- 30 April – Gary Lydon, 61, actor (The Banshees of Inisherin, The Clinic, War Horse).

=== May ===
- 1 May – Stephen Greene, 81, hurler (Mount Sion, Waterford senior team, Munster).
- 4 May – Brendan O'Brien, 82, journalist (Today Tonight, Prime Time).
- 5 May – Chris Phelan, 70, rugby league player (Parramatta Eels, Oldham, Queensland).
- 21 May
  - Liam Ferguson, 85, hurler (St Vincent's, Dublin senior team).
  - Liz Howard, 78, camogie player (Tipperary senior team), administrator and president of the Camogie Association (2006–2009).
- 24 May – Frank McGuigan, 70, Gaelic footballer (Ardboe O'Donovan Rossa, Tyrone senior team). Born in Northern Ireland.
- 28 May – Jim Treacy, 82, hurler (Bennettsbridge, Kilkenny senior team, Leinster).
- 31 May
  - Tomi Reichental, 90, Holocaust survivor. Born in Czechoslovakia.
  - Henry McMahon, 84, Irish musician (Big Tom and The Mainliners).

=== June ===
- 3 June
  - Fergus Slattery, 77, rugby union player (British & Irish Lions, Barbarians, national team).
  - Bobby Tambling, 84, footballer (Cork Celtic, Waterford, League of Ireland XI) and manager (Cork City).
- 4 June – Nell Hynes, 109, centenarian, oldest person in Ireland (since 2025).
- 5 June
  - Denis Coughlan, 80, Gaelic footballer and hurler (Glen Rovers, St Nicholas', Cork senior teams, Munster).
  - Marion Fossett, 71, circus ringmistress and singer.
- 7 June – Ernie Caffrey, 89, politician, senator (1997–2002).
- 9 June – Ciarán Ó Lionáird, 38, athlete.
- 11 June – Gerry O'Reilly, 61, athlete.
- 14 June – Lorcan O'Herlihy, 66, architect.
- 17 June – James Breen, 81, politician, TD (2002–2007).
- 22 June – Paul Clancy, 49, Gaelic footballer (Moycullen, Galway senior team) and manager (Garrycastle).
- 26 June – Philip Doyle, 61, rugby union coach (women's national team).
- 28 June – Eddie Bevans, 41, hurler (Shinrone, Offaly senior team).
- 30 June – David Andrews, 91, politician, TD (1965–2002) and Minister for Foreign Affairs (1992–1993 and 1997–2000).

=== July ===
- 3 July – Martin Naughton, 87, businessman, engineer and philanthropist.
- 4 July – Slaine Kelly, 43, actress (The Tudors, Comedown, Psychosis).
- 16 July – Brenda Fricker, 81, actress (My Left Foot, Home Alone 2: Lost in New York, A Time to Kill), Oscar winner (1990).
- 20 July – Stephen Gollogly, 41, Gaelic footballer (Carrickmacross Emmets, Monaghan senior team).
- 23 July – Patricia Donlon, 83, librarian and academic.
- 29 July – Glen Hansard, 56, musician (The Frames), songwriter ("Falling Slowly"), and actor (Once), Oscar winner (2008).

=== August ===
- 2 August – Michael Fingleton, 88, banker and CEO of Irish Nationwide Building Society (1971–2009).
- 4 August
  - Michael Conaghan, 81, politician, TD (2011–2016) and Lord Mayor of Dublin (2004–2005).
  - Liam O'Neill, 70, Gaelic games administrator, President of the Gaelic Athletic Association (2012–2015).
- 5 August
  - Vincent Browne, 78, sculptor.
  - Hugh O'Flaherty, 88, barrister and judge.
- 6 August – Bernard Barton, 75, judge.
- 10 August – James McHugh, 62, Gaelic footballer (Cill Chartha, Donegal senior team, Ulster).
- 12 August – Pádraig Horan, 76, hurler (St Rynagh's, Offaly senior team, Leinster).
- 18 August – Ollie Waldron, 83, rugby union player (national team).
- 23 August – Jimmy Lynam, 100, hurler (Glen Rovers, St Nicholas', Cork senior team).
- 27 August – Enda Bonner, 76, politician, senator (1997–2002).
- 30 August
  - Sé O'Hanlon, 84, road racing cyclist.
  - Phil O'Reilly, 92, Gaelic footballer (Tullamore, Offaly senior team).
- 31 August – Pádraig Horan, 76, hurler (St Rynagh's, Offaly senior team, Leinster.
- 31 August – Liam King, 84, hurler (Lorrha, Tipperary senior team, Munster).

=== September ===
- 3 September – Brian Fallon, 93, art critic.
- 5 September – Frank McDonald, 76, environmental journalist.
- 9 September
  - Paddy Doherty, 92, Gaelic footballer (Ballykinlar, Down senior team, Ulster).
  - Paddy Keenan, 76, uilleann piper (The Bothy Band).
- 14 September – Andy Gallagher, 89, hurler (Tullamore, Offaly senior team, Leinster) and manager (Offaly senior team).
- 21 September – Jacko McDonagh, 64, footballer (Bohemians, Shamrock Rovers, national team).
- 29 September – Joe Callanan, 77, politician, TD (2002–2007).
- 30 September – Andy Fenton, 73, hurler (Kiltormer, Galway senior team, Connacht).

=== October ===
- 8 October – Darragh Nelson, 36, Gaelic footballer (Ballyboden St Enda's, Dublin senior team).
- 21 October – Kevin O'Neill, 89, Gaelic footballer (Newry Mitchels, Down senior team).
- 23 October – Dónal Lunny, 79, folk musician.
- 25 October – Phil O'Callaghan, 83, rugby union player (Dolphin, national team).
- 29 October – Peter Nolan, 91, Gaelic footballer (Clara, Offaly senior team).

=== November ===
- 1 November
  - Gerry Collins, 88, politician, TD (1967–1997), MEP (1994–2004) and Minister for Foreign Affairs (1982 and 1989–1992).
  - Ciara Mageean, 34, Olympic middle-distance runner (2016, 2020). Born In Northern Ireland.
- 5 November – David Hewitt, 87, rugby union player (Ulster, national team). Born in Northern Ireland.
- 8 November – Johnny McEvoy, 81, singer.
- 11 November – Tom O'Brien, 39, jockey.
- 12 November – Kevin Dillon, 85, Gaelic footballer (Duagh, Clonakilty, Cork senior team).
- 14 November – Paddy Turner, 87, footballer (Shamrock Rovers, Dundalk, Celtic, national team).
- 16 November – Lee Reeves, 31, boxer.
- 18 November – Jim Corr, 92, politician, TD (1982), Lord Mayor of Cork (1979–1980, 1996–1997).
