= Séamus O'Sullivan =

Séamus O'Sullivan may refer to:

- Seumas O'Sullivan (1879–1958), Irish poet and editor of The Dublin Magazine
- Séamus O'Sullivan (Gaelic footballer) (born 1954) is an Irish retired Gaelic footballer
- Séamus Ó Súilleabháin (fl. 1849), Irish scribe, writer and translator
