= 1983 Meath Intermediate Football Championship =

Meath I.F.C.
- Season: 1983
- Champions: Moynalvey; 1st Intermediate Football Championship title
- Relegated: Grove Emmets; Kilcloon; Kilbride
- Matches: ??

The 1983 Meath Intermediate Football Championship is the 57th edition of the Meath GAA's premier club Gaelic football tournament for intermediate graded teams in County Meath, Ireland. The tournament consists of 20 teams. The championship starts with a group stage and then progresses to a knock out stage.

This was St. Michael's first year ever in this grade as they were promoted from the J.F.C. after claiming the 1982 Meath Junior Football Championship title. It was also just their 4th year in existence after the two clubs Kilbeg and Carlanstown amalgamated in 1980.

From this season onwards, the Division II (now known as Junior B) club Kilmessan and Intermediate club Dunsany amalgamated. The football section of the new club was called Dunsany and the hurling section was named Kilmessan.

For the 1983 season, Junior club St. Louis Blues and Intermediate club Rathkenny amalgamated under the name Grove Emmets, but were relegated at the end of the season.

On 23 October 1983, Moynalvey claimed their 1st Intermediate championship title when they defeated St. Mary's Donore 1–8 to 0–6 in the final at Pairc Tailteann. This was their first time ever to be awarded a place in the S.F.C.

Grove Emmets, Kilcloon and Kilbride were relegated to the J.F.C.

== Team changes ==
The following teams have changed division since the 1982 championship season.

=== From I.F.C. ===
Promoted to S.F.C.

- Kilmainhamwood - (Intermediate Champions)

Relegated to J.A.F.C.

- Curraha

=== To I.F.C. ===
Regraded from S.F.C.

- Dunshaughlin

Promoted from J.A.F.C.

- St. Michael's - (Junior 'A' Champions)

== Group stage ==
There are 3 groups called Group A, B and C. The top finishers in Group A and C will qualify for the semi-finals. First place in Group B along with the runners-up in all the groups qualify for the quarter-finals.

=== Group A ===
Team	Pld	W	L	D	PF	PA	PD	Pts
Moynalvey	6	6	0	0	52	23	+29	12
Wolfe Tones	6	5	1	0	41	36	+5	10
Donaghmore	6	3	3	0	56	54	+2	6
Oldcastle	6	3	3	0	43	50	-7	6
Dunshaughlin	6	3	3	0	40	48	-8	6
Slane	6	1	5	0	46	52	-6	2
Walterstown 'B'	6	0	6	0	11	26	-15	0

Round 1:

- Wolfe Tones 0-10, 0-7 Slane, Seneschalstown, 24/4/1983,
- Donaghmore 0-12, 0-5 Walterstown 'B', Skryne, 24/4/1983,
- Oldcastle 2-4, 1-4 Dunshaughlin, Martry, 1/5/1983,
- Moynalvey - Bye,

Round 2:

- Slane 2-8, 0-6 Walterstown 'B', Duleek, 8/5/1983,
- Wolfe Tones 0-8, 0-7 Donaghmore, Dunshaughlin, 22/5/1983,
- Moynalvey 1-8, 1-3 Oldcastle, Athboy, 22/5/1983,
- Dunshaughlin - Bye.

Round 3:

- Moynalvey 2-6, 1-2 Dunshaughlin, Batterstown, 29/5/1983,
- Donaghmore 0-10, 0-5 Slane, Duleek, 29/5/1983,
- Wolfe Tones w/o, scr Walterstown 'B', Kells, 29/5/1983,
- Oldcastle - Bye,

Round 4:

- Donaghmore 1-10, 1-7 Oldcastle, Pairc Tailteann, 19/6/1983,
- Dunshaughlin 2-5, 0-10 Slane, Skryne, 19/6/1983,
- Moynalvey w/o, scr Walterstown 'B',
- Wolfe Tones - Bye,

Round 5:

- Moynalvey 1-11, 1-4 Donaghmore, Dunshaughlin, 10/7/1983,
- Wolfe Tones 1-6, 0-2 Oldcastle, Kells, 21/8/1983, *
- Dunshaughlin w/o, scr Walterstown 'B',
- Slane - Bye,

Round 6:

- Moynalvey 2-9, 0-5 Wolfe Tones, Dunshaughlin, 16/7/1983,
- Oldcastle 0-15, 2-4 Slane, Martry, 16/7/1983,
- Dunshaughlin 1-9, 0-7 Donaghmore, Skryne, 17/7/1983,
- Walterstown 'B' - Bye,

Round 7:

- Wolfe Tones 0-9, 0-5 Dunshaughlin, Skryne, 27/8/1983,
- Oldcastle w/o, scr Walterstown 'B',
- Moynalvey w/o, scr Slane,
- Donaghmore - Bye,

- The Round 5 game between Wolfe Tones and Oldcastle was originally fixed for Kells on the 9/7/1983, but was abandoned after 51 minutes when the scores were tied 1-5 each. This was due to Tones supporter Mattie O'Brien falling ill at the match. He was taken to Our Lady's Hospital Navan but later died. The game was refixed at a later date which the Tones won.

=== Group B ===
Team	Pld	W	L	D	PF	PA	PD	Pts
St. Michael's	6	5	0	1	68	35	+33	11
Meath Hill	6	5	1	0	50*	37*	+13*	10
Navan O'Mahonys 'B'	6	3	3	0	47*	36*	+11*	6
Dunsany	6	3	3	0	81	77	+4	6
Dunderry	6	2	4	0	41	43	-2	4
Grove Emmets	6	1	5	0	44	75	-31	2
Moylagh	6	1	5	0	37	65	-28	2

Round 1:

- Moylagh 0-7, 0-6 Dunderry, Kells, 17/4/1983,
- Meath Hill 1-7, 0-7 Grove Emmets, Kilberry, 24/4/1983,
- St. Michael's 1-8, 0-7 Navan O'Mahonys 'B', Kilberry, 13/5/1983,
- Dunsany - Bye,

Round 2:

- Navan O'Mahonys 'B' 3-14, 2-5 Dunsany, Kilberry, 22/5/1983,
- Dunderry 2-7, 0-9 Grove Emmets, Seneschalstown, 22/5/1983,
- Meath Hill 2-8, 2-4 Moylagh, Drumbaragh, 1/7/1983,
- St. Michael's - Bye,

Round 3:

- Meath Hill 0-5, 0-4 Dunderry, Kilberry, 27/5/1983,
- St. Michael's 2–7, 1-10 Dunsany, Trim, 29/5/1983,
- Grove Emmets 0-9, 0-8 Moylagh, Martry, 29/5/1983,
- Navan O'Mahonys 'B' - Bye,

Round 4:

- St. Michael's 2-4, 1-1 Meath Hill, Castletown, 17/6/1983,
- Dunderry 1-7, 1-5 Navan O'Mahonys 'B', Castletown, 19/6/1983,
- Dunsany 1-14, 0-7 Moylagh, Kells, 19/6/1983,
- Grove Emmets - Bye,

Round 5:

- St. Michael's 2-13, 0-5 Moylagh, Kells, 8/7/1983,
- Dunsany 1-11, 1-5 Dunderry, Trim, 17/7/1983,
- Navan O'Mahonys 2-3, 0-4 Grove Emmets, Kilberry, 17/7/1983,
- Meath Hill - Bye,

Round 6:

- Dunsany 3-11, 0-9 Grove Emmets, Seneschalstown, 30/7/1983,
- Meath Hill w, l Navan O'Mahonys 'B', Pairc Tailteann, 28/7/1983,
- St. Michael's w/o, scr Dunderry, Kilberry, 20/8/1983,
- Moylagh - Bye,

Round 7:

- Meath Hill 2-11, 1-3 Dunsany, Kells, 21/8/1983,
- St. Michael's 1-12, 1-3 Grove Emmets, Kilberry, 21/8/1983,
- Navan O'Mahonys 'B' w/o, scr Moylagh,
- Dunderry - Bye,

=== Group C ===
Team	Pld	W	L	D	PF	PA	PD	Pts
St. Mary's Donore	5	4	0	1	63	33	+30	9
Martry Harps	5	3	1	1	52	45	+7	7
Duleek	5	3	1	1	82	37	+45	7
Ratoath	5	2	3	0	44	53	-9	4
Kilcloon	5	1	4	0	34*	50*	-16*	2
Kilbride	5	0	4	1	15*	72*	-57*	1

Round 1:

- St. Mary's 2-4, 0-4 Martry Harps, Seneschalstown, 17/4/1983,
- Ratoath 1-5, 0-4 Kilbride, Duleek, 17/4/1983,
- Duleek 3-8, 0-10 Kilcloon, Curraha, 24/4/1983,

Round 2:

- Martry Harps 0-12, 2-5 Duleek, Kilberry, 8/5/1983,
- Ratoath 0-12, 1-6 Kilcloon, Skryne, 15/5/1983,
- St. Mary's 1-18, 0-1 Kilbride, Curraha, 19/6/1983,

Round 3:

- Martry Harps 0–8, 1-5 Kilbride, Duleek, 29/5/1983,
- St. Mary's 2-7, 1-8 Kilcloon, Kilmessan, 29/5/1983,
- Duleek 0-10, 0-4 Ratoath, Skryne, 17/6/1983,

Round 4:

- Martry Harps 0-8, 0-4 Kilcloon, Kilmessan, 17/6/1983,
- Duleek 6-17, 0-2 Kilbride, Skryne, 10/7/1983,
- St. Mary's 1-7, 0-8 Ratoath, Duleek, 17/7/1983,

Round 5:

- St. Mary's 0–9, 1-6 Duleek, Pairc Tailteann, 21/8/1983,
- Martry Harps 3-11, 2-6 Ratoath, Seneschalstown, 21/8/1983,
- Kilcloon w, l Kilbride,

Quarter-final Playoff:

- Martry Harps 3-10 2-8 Duleek, Pairc Tailteann, 4/9/1983,

== Knock-out Stages ==
=== Finals ===
The teams in the quarter-finals are the second placed teams from each group and the Group A winner. The teams in the semi-finals are Group B and C winners along with the quarter-final winners.

Quarter-Finals
Moynalvey	2-9
Meath Hill	2-3
Wolfe Tones	1-7
Martry Harps	1-8

Semi-Finals
Moynalvey	0-8
St. Michael's	0-5
St. Mary's	1-10
Martry Harps	0-11

Final
Moynalvey	1-8
St. Mary's	0-6

Quarter-final:

- Moynalvey 2-9, 2-3 Meath Hill, Pairc Tailteann, 4/9/1983,
- Martry Harps 1-8, 1-7 Wolfe Tones, 11/9/1983,

Semi-final:

- Moynalvey 0-8, 0-5 St. Michael's, 11/9/1982,
- St. Mary's 1-10, 0-11 Martry Harps, 2/10/1982,

Final:

- Moynalvey 1-8, 0-6 St. Mary's, Pairc Tailteann, 23/10/1982,
