= 1984 Meath Senior Football Championship =

Meath S.F.C.
- Season: 1984
- Champions: Walterstown; 5th Senior Championship Title
- Relegated: Gaeil Colmcille; Martinstown/Athboy
- Leinster SCFC: Walterstown (preliminary round) Athlone 1-12, Walterstown 0-7
- Winning Captain: Gerry Cooney (Walterstown)
- Man of the Match: Martin Barry (Walterstown)
- Matches: 35

The 1984 Meath Senior Football Championship is the 92nd edition of the Meath GAA's premier club Gaelic football tournament for senior graded teams in County Meath, Ireland. The tournament consists of 15 teams, with the winner going on to represent Meath in the Leinster Senior Club Football Championship. The championship starts with a group stage and then progresses to a knock out stage.

Walterstown were the defending champions for the second year in a row after they defeated Navan O'Mahonys in the previous years final, and they successfully defended their title (to claim the "3-in-a-row") when beating Skryne 2–9 to 1–7 in the final in Pairc Tailteann on 30 September 1984. This was their 5th S.F.C. success. Gerry Cooney raised the Keegan Cup for Walterstown while Martin Barry claimed the 'Man of the Match' award.

This was Moynalvey's first ever period in the senior grade after claiming the 1983 Meath Intermediate Football Championship title.

Gaeil Colmcille and Martinstown/Athboy were regraded to the I.F.C. after 19 and 5 years as senior clubs respectively.

== Team changes ==
The following teams have changed division since the 1983 championship season.

=== To S.F.C. ===
Promoted from I.F.C.

- Moynalvey - (Intermediate Champions)

=== From S.F.C. ===
Regraded to I.F.C.

- n/a

== Group stage ==
=== Group A ===
Team	Pld	W	L	D	PF	PA	PD	Pts
Walterstown	4	4	0	0	67	34	+33	8
Skryne	4	3	1	0	51	33	+18	6
Summerhill	4	2	2	0	51	42	+9	4
St. Patrick's	4	1	3	0	23	49	-26	2
Kilmainhamwood	4	0	4	0	14	48	-34	0

Round 1

- Walterstown 2-10, 0-6 Kilmainhamwood, 22/4/1984,
- Skryne 2-11, 1-5 St. Patrick's, 22/4/1984,
- Summerhill - Bye,

Round 2

- Skryne 0-10, 1-3 Kilmainhamwood, Pairc Tailteann, 5/6/1984,
- Summerhill 1-12, 0-4 St. Patrick's, Pairc Tailteann, 5/6/1984,
- Walterstown - Bye,

Round 3

- Walterstown 1-9, 0-10 Skryne, 1/7/1984,
- Summerhill 0-22, 0-2 Kilmainhamwood, 1/7/1984,
- St. Patrick's - Bye,

Round 4

- Skryne 0-14, 0-7 Summerhill, 29/7/1984,
- Walterstown 3-8, 1-8 St. Patrick's, 29/7/1984,
- Kilmainhamwood - Bye,

Round 5

- Walterstown 4-10, 0-7 Summerhill, 26/8/1984,
- St. Patrick's w/o, scr Kilmainhamwood,
- Skryne - Bye,

=== Group B ===
Team	Pld	W	L	D	PF	PA	PD	Pts
Seneschalstown	4	3	0	1	69	32	+37	7
Nobber	4	3	1	0	66	32	+34	6
Castletown	4	2	1	1	18*	28*	-10*	5
Syddan	4	0	3	1	18	43	-25	1
Gaeil Colmcille	4	0	3	1	13*	46*	-33*	1

Round 1

- Seneschalstown 3-12, 0-4 Syddan, 22/4/1984,
- Nobber 1-18, 0-2 Gaeil Colmcille, 22/4/1984,
- Castletown - Bye,

Round 2

- Seneschalstown 3-9, 1-1 Gaeil Colmcille, 10/6/1984,
- Nobber 1-14, 1-4 Castletown, Kilberry, 10/6/1984,
- Syddan - Bye

Round 3

- Seneschalstown 0–11, 1-8 Castletown, 1/7/1984,
- Syddan 0–7, 1-4 Gaeil Colmcille, 1/7/1984,
- Nobber - Bye,

Round 4

- Castletown 4-11, 0-7 Gaeil Colmcille, 8/7/1984,
- Nobber 2-9, 0-7 Syddan, 29/7/1984,
- Seneschalstown - Bye,

Round 5

- Seneschalstown 1-13, 2-7 Nobber, 19/8/1984,
- Castletown w/o, scr Syddan,
- Gaeil Colmcille - Bye,

=== Group C ===
Team	Pld	W	L	D	PF	PA	PD	Pts
Navan O'Mahonys	4	4	0	0	46	26	+20	8
Moynalvey	4	3	1	0	25*	29*	-4*	6
Ballivor	4	1	2	1	22*	31*	-9*	3
Trim	4	1	2	1	38	41	-3	3
Martinstown/Athboy	4	0	4	0	11**	15**	-4**	0

Round 1

- Navan O'Mahonys 2-11, 0-7 Moynalvey, 22/4/1984,
- Trim 2-9, 1-8 Martinstown/Athboy, 29/4/1984,
- Ballivor - Bye,

Round 2

- Ballivor w, l Martinstown/Athboy,
- Navan O'Mahonys 1-12, 2-4 Trim, Athboy, 10/6/1984,
- Moynalvey - Bye,

Round 3

- Navan O'Mahonys 2-8, 1-6 Ballivor, 1/7/1984,
- Moynalvey 1-5, 1-3 Trim, 1/7/1984,
- Martinstown/Athboy - Bye,

Round 4

- Ballivor 1–4, 0-7 Trim, 29/7/1984,
- Moynalvey w, l Martinstown/Athboy,
- Navan O'Mahonys - Bye,

Round 5

- Moynalvey 1-7, 0-6 Ballivor, 20/8/1984,
- Navan O'Mahonys w/o, scr Martinstown/Athboy,
- Trim - Bye,

== Knock-out stages ==
The winners of Group A & C qualify for the semi-finals. The winner of Group B and the runners-up of each group go into the quarter-finals.

Quarter-Finals
Seneschalstown	1-12
Moynalvey	2-7
Skryne	0-13
Nobber	2-4

Semi-Finals
Walterstown	2-9
Seneschalstown	0-13
Navan O'Mahonys	2-7
Skryne	2-9

Final
Walterstown	2-9
Skryne	1-7

Quarter-finals:

- Seneschalstown 1-12, 2-7 Moynalvey, Pairc Tailteann, 9/9/1984,
- Skryne 0-13, 2-4 Nobber, Pairc Tailteann, 9/9/1984,

Semi-finals:

- Walterstown 2-9, 0-13 Seneschalstown, Pairc Tailteann, 16/9/1984,
- Skryne 2-9, 2-7 Navan O'Mahonys, Pairc Tailteann, 16/9/1984,

Final:

- Walterstown 2-9, 1-7 Skryne, Pairc Tailteann, 30/9/1984,

== Leinster Senior Club Football Championship ==
Preliminary round:

- Athlone 1-12, 0-7 Walterstown, Athlone, 21/10/1984,
