= 1982 Meath Intermediate Football Championship =

Meath I.F.C.
- Season: 1982
- Champions: Kilmainhamwood; 2nd Intermediate Football Championship title
- Relegated: Curraha
- Matches: 64

The 1982 Meath Intermediate Football Championship is the 56th edition of the Meath GAA's premier club Gaelic football tournament for intermediate graded teams in County Meath, Ireland. The tournament consists of 20 teams. The championship starts with a group stage and then progresses to a knock out stage.

Moynalvey were promoted after claiming the 1981 Meath Junior Football Championship title.

On 3 October 1981, Kilmainhamwood claimed their 2nd Intermediate championship title when they defeated Martry Harps 1–5 to 0–7 in the final. This ended their 17-year absence from the S.F.C.

Curraha were regraded to the J.F.C. for 1983 after winning only one match.

== Team changes ==
The following teams have changed division since the 1981 championship season.

=== From I.F.C. ===
Promoted to S.F.C.

- Ballivor - (Intermediate Champions)

Relegated to J.A.F.C.

- Ballinabrackey

=== To I.F.C. ===
Regraded from S.F.C.

- n/a

Promoted from J.A.F.C.

- Moynalvey - (Junior 'A' Champions)

== Group stage ==
There are 3 groups called Group A, B and C. The top finishers in Group A and C will qualify for the semi-finals. First place in Group B along with the runners-up in all the groups qualify for the quarter-finals.

=== Group A ===
Team	Pld	W	L	D	PF	PA	PD	Pts
Wolfe Tones	5	4	1	0	59	22	+37	8
Kilmainhamwood	5	3	1	1	61	39	+22	7
Dunsany	5	3	2	0	56	44	+22	6
Kilbride	5	2	3	0	34	45	-9	4
Oldcastle	5	1	4	0	40	74	-34	2
Curraha	5	1	4	0	42	61	-19	2

Round 1:

- Dunsany 2-9, 0-4 Kilbride, Dunshaughlin, 28/3/1982,
- Wolfe Tones 2-7, 0-3 Curraha, Dunshaughlin, 18/4/1982,
- Kilmainhamwood 3-8, 0-6 Oldcastle, Kells, 18/4/1982,

Round 2:

- Wolfe Tones 1-9, 1-2 Kilmainhamwood, Castletown, 2/5/1982,
- Dunsany 0-8, 1-2 Curraha, Dunshaughlin, 2/5/1982,
- Kilbride 1-6, 1-4 Oldcastle, Kilberry, 2/5/1982,

Round 3:

- Kilmainhamwood 1–4, 0-7 Kilbride, Pairc Tailteann, 9/5/1982,
- Wolfe Tones 1-9, 0-4 Dunsany, Kilmessan, 23/5/1982,
- Oldcastle 1-11, 3-3 Curraha, Martry, 30/5/1982,

Round 4:

- Kilmainhamwood 2-10, 1-5 Curraha, Kilberry, 6/6/1982,
- Kilbride 0-4, 0-2 Wolfe Tones, Duleek, 6/6/1982,
- Dunsany 1-13, 0-7 Oldcastle, Kilskyre, 6/6/1982,

Round 5:

- Wolfe Tones 4-8, 0-6 Oldcastle, Athboy, 27/6/1982,
- Kilmainhamwood 0-16, 2-7 Dunsany, Martry, 11/7/1982,
- Curraha 1-11, 1-7 Kilbride, Skryne, 11/7/1982,

=== Group B ===
Team	Pld	W	L	D	PF	PA	PD	Pts
Moynalvey	6	4	0	2	57	42	+15	10
St. Mary's Donore	6	4	1	1	75	41	+34	9
Slane	6	4	1	1	78	49	+29	9
Meath Hill	6	3	3	0	62	61	+1	6
Donaghmore	6	2	4	0	39	58	-19	4
Kilcloon	6	1	4	1	50	84	-34	3
Walterstown 'B'	6	0	6	0	20	43	-23	0

Round 1:

- St. Mary's 1–9, 1-9 Kilcloon, Dunshaughlin, 28/3/1982,
- Slane 0-14, 0-7 Meath Hill, Kilberry, 28/3/1982,
- Moynalvey 1-6, 1-0 Donaghmore, Dunshaughlin, 2/5/1982,
- Walterstown 'B' - Bye,

Round 2:

- Kilcloon 5-4, 0-7 Walterstown 'B', Dunshaughlin, 25/4/1982,
- Slane 1-10, 2-4 Donaghmore, Dunshaughlin, 9/5/1982,
- Moynalvey 0–13, 2-7 Meath Hill, Seneschalstown, 11/6/1982,
- St. Mary's - Bye,

Round 3:

- St. Mary's 3-4, 1-1 Walterstown 'B', Duleek, 9/5/1982,
- Meath Hill 2-7, 1-8 Donaghmore, Seneschalstown, 23/5/1982,
- Moynalvey 1–10, 1-10 Slane, Skryne, 20/6/1982,
- Kilcloon - Bye,

Round 4:

- Donaghmore 2-5, 0-9 Walterstown 'B', Skryne, 30/5/1982,
- St. Mary's 0-10, 1-4 Slane, Curraha, 27/6/1982,
- Moynalvey 1-8, 0-5 Kilcloon, Summerhill, 27/6/1982,
- Meath Hill - Bye,

Round 5:

- Moynalvey w/o, scr Walterstown 'B', Kilmessan, 11/7/1982,
- Meath Hill 5-8, 0-5 Kilcloon, Kilberry, 11/7/1982,
- St. Mary's 2-8, 0-4 Donaghmore, Duleek, 11/7/1982,
- Slane - Bye,

Round 6:

- Moynalvey 0-11, 0-8 St. Mary's, Pairc Tailteann, 18/7/1982,
- Slane 4-19, 0-9 Kilcloon, Skryne, 18/7/1982,
- Meath Hill w/o, scr Walterstown 'B',
- Donaghmore - Bye,

Round 7:

- St. Mary's 3-9, 1-3 Meath Hill, Pairc Tailteann, 30/7/1982,
- Slane w/o, scr Walterstown,
- Donaghmore w/o, scr Kilcloon,
- Moynalvey - Bye

Quarter-final Play-off:

- St. Mary's 1-13, 0-5 Slane, Seneschalstown, 22/8/1982,

=== Group C ===
Team	Pld	W	L	D	PF	PA	PD	Pts
Navan O'Mahonys 'B'	6	6	0	0	94	37	+57	12
Martry Harps	6	5	1	0	75	56	+19	10
Dunderry	6	4	2	0	44*	39*	+5*	8
Duleek	6	3	3	0	48**	44**	+4**	6
Ratoath	6	2	4	0	14***	23***	-9***	4
Moylagh	6	1	5	0	17***	56***	-39***	2
Rathkenny	6	0	6	0	23*	63*	-40*	0

Round 1:

- Dunderry 0-10, 0-5 Rathkenny, Martry, 28/3/1982,
- Navan O'Mahonys 'B' 1-11, 2-6 Duleek, Martry, 18/4/1982,
- Martry Harps 1-6, 1-5 Moylagh, Kilskyre, 18/4/1982,
- Ratoath - Bye,

Round 2:

- Navan O'Mahonys 'B' 1-4, 0-3 Dunderry, Athboy, 2/5/1982,
- Martry Harps 1-7, 0-4 Ratoath, Seneschalstown, 2/5/1982,
- Duleek 5-5, 1-1 Rathkenny, Seneschalstown, 2/5/1982,
- Moylagh - Bye,

Round 3:

- Ratoath w, l Moylagh, Kilberry, 9/5/1982,
- Navan O'Mahonys 'B' 1-7, 0-4 Rathkenny, Seneschalstown, 9/5/1982,
- Dunderry 1-7, 0-6 Duleek, Seneschalstown, 9/5/1982,
- Martry Harps - Bye,

Round 4:

- Navan O'Mahonys 'B' 1-10, 1-7 Ratoath, Skryne, 23/5/1982,
- Dunderry 2-6, 0-6 Moylagh, Kells, 23/5/1982,
- Martry Harps 2-10, 1-7 Duleek, Kilberry, 23/5/1982,
- Rathkenny - Bye,

Round 5:

- Duleek w, l Ratoath, Dunshaughlin, 30/5/1982,
- Martry Harps 4-11, 1-7 Rathkenny, Kells, 20/6/1982,
- Navan O'Mahonys 'B' 6-17, 0-3 Moylagh, Martry, 27/6/1982,
- Dunderry - Bye,

Round 6:

- Martry Harps 1-12, 0-9 Dunderry, Kilmessan, 27/6/1982,
- Ratoath w/o, scr Rathkenny, Duleek, 27/6/1982,
- Duleek w, l Moylagh,
- Navan O'Mahonys 'B' - Bye,

Round 7:

- Navan O'Mahonys 'B' 3-6, 0-5 Martry Harps, Seneschalstown, 11/7/1982,
- Dunderry w, l Ratoath,
- Moylagh w, l Rathkenny,
- Duleek - Bye,

== Knock-out Stages ==
=== Finals ===
The teams in the quarter-finals are the second placed teams from each group and the Group B winner. The teams in the semi-finals are Group A and C winners along with the quarter-final winners.

Quarter-Finals
Martry Harps	1-6
St. Mary's	0-5
Kilmainhamwood	1-5
Moynalvey	0-6

Semi-Finals
Wolfe Tones	0-3
Martry Harps	0-5
Navan O'Mahonys 'B'	2-4
Kilmainhamwood	1-8

Final
Martry Harps	0-7
Kilmainhamwood	1-5

Quarter-final:

- Martry Harps 1-6, 0-5 St. Mary's, Kilberry, 29/8/1982,
- Kilmainhamwood 1-5, 0-6 Moynalvey, Kilberry, 29/8/1982,

Semi-final:

- Kilmainhamwood 1-8, 2-4 Navan O'Mahonys 'B', Martry, 5/9/1982,
- Martry Harps 0-5, 0-3 Wolfe Tones, Kells, 12/9/1982,

Final:

- Kilmainhamwood 1-5, 0-7 Martry Harps, Kells, 30/10/1982,
