= 1973 All-Ireland Minor Football Championship =

Gaelic football competition

Championship details

All-Ireland Champions
- Winning team: Tyrone (3rd win)

All-Ireland Finalists
- Losing team: Kildare

Provincial Champions
- Munster: Cork
- Leinster: Kildare
- Ulster: Tyrone
- Connacht: Mayo

The 1973 All-Ireland Minor Football Championship was the 42nd staging of the All-Ireland Minor Football Championship, the Gaelic Athletic Association's premier inter-county Gaelic football tournament for boys under the age of 18.

Cork entered the championship as defending champions, however, they were defeated by Tyrone.

On 23 September 1973, Tyrone won the championship following a 2-11 to 1-6 defeat of Kildare in the All-Ireland final. This was their third All-Ireland title overall and their first in 25 championship seasons.

== Results ==
=== Connacht Minor Football Championship ===
Quarter-Final

1973 Quarter-Final	Galway	1-10 - 1-06	Sligo	Kilcoyne Park, Tubbercurry

Semi-Finals

1973 Semi-Final	Mayo	2-10 - 0-02	Leitrim	Páirc Seán Mac Diarmada, Carrick-on-Shannon

1973 Semi-Final	Roscommon	1-06 - 1-12	Galway	McHale Park, Castlebar

Finals

'Home'

8 July 1973 Final	Mayo	3-07 - 0-03	Galway	St Jarlath's Park, Tuam

'England'

29 July 1973 Final	Mayo	2-14 - 0-02	Herefordshire	McHale Park, Castlebar

=== Munster Minor Football Championship ===
Quarter-Finals

1973 Quarter-Final	Clare	3–07 – 1–08	Waterford	Seán Treacy Park, Tipperary

1973 Quarter-Final	Tipperary	3–07 – 2–07	Limerick	Gaelic Grounds, Limerick

Semi-Finals

1973 Semi-Final	Cork	3–11 – 1–04	Clare	Gaelic Grounds, Limerick

1973 Semi-Final	Tipperary	2–07 – 0–13	Kerry	Ned Hall Park, Clonmel

1973 Semi-Final Replay	Tipperary	0–05 – 1–14	Kerry	Frank Sheehy Park, Listowel

Final

15 July 1973 Final	Cork	1–13 – 3–05	Kerry	Cork Athletic Grounds, Cork

=== Ulster Minor Football Championship ===
Preliminary round

1973 Preliminary round	Down	2-06 - 0-06	Monaghan	Carrickmacross

Quarter-Finals

1973 Quarter-Final	Cavan	3-08 - 2-04	Armagh	Breffni Park, Cavan

1973 Quarter-Final	Derry	6-10 - 0-07	Fermanagh	St. Molaise Park, Irvinestown

1973 Quarter-Final	Antrim	1-06 - 1-07	Tyrone	The Playing Fields, Lurgan

1973 Quarter-Final	Derry	1-12 - 1-11	Donegal

Semi-Finals

1973 Semi-Final	Cavan	0-05 - 0-09	Down	St. Tiernach's Park, Clones

1973 Semi-Final	Tyrone	2-07 - 1-07	Derry	The Playing Fields, Lurgan

Final

29 July 1973 Final	Tyrone	1-13 - 0-09	Down	St. Tiernach's Park, Clones

=== Leinster Minor Football Championship ===
First round

1973 First Round	Kilkenny	1-10 - 0-07	Carlow	Nowlan Park, Kilkenny

1973 First Round	Louth	2-09 - 1-06	Dublin	Páirc Tailteann, Navan

Second round

1973 Second Round	Louth	7-06 - 1-03	Kilkenny	Dundalk

Quarter-Finals

1973 Quarter-Final	Wexford	1-11 - 1-11	Dublin	Wexford Park, Wexford

1973 Quarter-Final Replay	Wexford	0-17 - 0-09	Dublin	Parnell Park, Dublin

1973 Quarter-Final	Westmeath	1-09 - 1-08	Meath	Cusack Park, Mullingar

1973 Quarter-Final	Laois	4-08 - 2-03	Wicklow	Aughrim Park, Aughrim

1973 Quarter-Final	Offaly	1-04 - 2-13	Louth	Páirc Tailteann, Navan

Semi-Finals

1973 Semi-Final	Kildare	1-11 - 2-06	Louth	Páirc Tailteann, Navan

1973 Semi-Final	Laois	1-03 - 3-13	Westmeath	St Conleth's Park, Newbridge

Final

22 July 1973 Final	Laois	0-10 - 4-11	Kildare	Croke Park, Dublin

=== All-Ireland Minor Football Championship ===
Semi-Finals

12 August 1973 Semi-Final	Mayo	0-08 - 0-09	Kildare	Croke Park, Dublin

19 August 1973 Semi-Final	Tyrone	1-07 - 0-10	Cork	Croke Park, Dublin

26 August 1973 Semi-Final Replay	Tyrone	3-10 - 1-10	Cork	Croke Park, Dublin

Final

23 September 1973 Final	Tyrone	2-11 - 1-06	Kildare	Croke Park, Dublin

== Championship statistics ==
=== Miscellaneous ===
- Kildare win the Leinster Championship for the first time in their history. They also qualify for their first and only All-Ireland final appearance.
