= Eamonn Barry =

Irish Gaelic footballer and manager

Eamonn Barry is an Irish former Gaelic footballer and manager who was involved in both roles with the Meath county team.

== Early life ==
He has two sons, they are Andrew and Kevin.

== Career ==
Barry played for Meath in the 1980s. He was a member of the Meath team that annexed the Centenary Cup in 1984.

Barry had success as manager of Dunshaughlin football club in Meath. He became coach of the Meath team for the 2006 All-Ireland SFC, successor to long-time manager Seán Boylan. The team won the O'Byrne Cup after beating Offaly in Navan. Following a County Board meeting, Barry was replaced by Colm Coyle as Meath manager on 11 September 2006. His response was: "I'm not a bit surprised. I've been well aware of the situation for the past couple of months".

Barry is the current Meath County Coaching Officer, and has been involved with Meath Development squads as Joint Manager, 2014 (Meath U14) and Selector 2015 (Meath U15) since 2013.

Preceded by Seán Boylan	Meath Senior Football Manager; 2005–2006	Succeeded by Colm Coyle
