= Eamonn O'Brien (Gaelic footballer) =

Meath player and manager

Personal information
- Native name: Éamann Ó Briain (Irish)
- Born: 21 September 1960 (age 66) Walterstown, County Meath, Ireland

Sport
- Sport: Gaelic football
Inter-county management
- Years: Team
- 2008–2010: Meath
Inter-county titles as manager
County	League	Province	All-Ireland
Meath		1	1

Eamonn O'Brien (born in Walterstown, County Meath, Ireland on 21 September 1960) is a former Gaelic footballer, selector and manager. Having been a selector under the management of Seán Boylan, O'Brien managed Meath between 2008 and 2010, leading the team to one Leinster SFC title after a controversial final.

== Playing career ==
O'Brien captained Walterstown to the 1982 Meath Senior Football Championship title.

He also captained Meath to the 1972 Leinster MFC title.

== Managerial career ==
O'Brien was confirmed as Meath manager on 10 November 2008, to succeed Colm Coyle, after a meeting with the county board. His team had a reasonably successful 2009 season, losing to Dublin in the Leinster SFC quarter-final, but went through the All-Ireland SFC qualifier system to reach the All-Ireland SFC semi final, where they were defeated by Kerry.

O'Brien's team comprehensively defeated Dublin in the 2010 Leinster SFC semi-final, and then won the final in controversial circumstances against Louth. In the final moments of this match, Meath forward Joe Sheridan was awarded a goal – which on replay evidence should not have stood – to give Meath a two-point win. Appeals for a replay were refused. Meath went on to be beaten by Kildare in the 2010 All-Ireland SFC quarter-final.

On 6 September 2010, O'Brien was unexpectedly axed as manager after many of the county's clubs voted him out. On 10 November 2010, former Monaghan manager Séamus McEnaney succeeded O'Brien as Meath manager.

Preceded by Colm Coyle	Meath Senior Football Manager; 2008–2010	Succeeded by Séamus McEnaney
