= Séamus O'Sullivan (Gaelic footballer) =

Irish Gaelic footballer

Personal information
- Native name: Séamus Ó Súilleabháin (Irish)
- Born: 1954 (age 71–72) Dunmanway, County Cork, Ireland

Sport
- Sport: Gaelic football
- Position: Right corner-back
Club
- Years: Club
- Dohenys
Club titles
- Cork titles: 0
Inter-county
Years	County	Apps (scores)
1976-1980	Cork	7 (0-00)
Inter-county titles
- Munster titles: 0
- All-Irelands: 0
- NFL: 1
- All Stars: 0

Séamus O'Sullivan (born 1954) is an Irish retired Gaelic footballer who played for Cork Championship club Dohenys and at inter-county level with the Cork senior football team. He usually lined out at corner-back or centre-back.

== Career ==
O'Sullivan first came to notice at juvenile and underage levels with the Dohenys club in Dunmanway. He eventually progressed to the adult team and won a Cork IFC title in 1972 before losing to Nemo Rangers in the 1975 Cork SFC final. O'Sullivan first appeared on the inter-county scene with the Cork minor football team and was at centre-back on the team that won the All-Ireland MFC title in 1972. He later lined out with the under-21 team. Murphy joined the Cork senior football team in 1976 and made a number of appearances before leaving the panel in 1980. He was a member of the team that won the 1979–80 National League title.

== Personal life ==
O'Sullivan later became involved with the Bishopstown club after moving to Cork. His son, Jamie O'Sullivan, was part of Cork's All-Ireland SFC-winning team in 2010.

== Honours ==
Dohenys

- Cork Intermediate Football Championship: 1972

Cork

- National Football League: 1979–80
- Munster Under-21 Football Championship: 1974
- All-Ireland Minor Football Championship: 1972
- Munster Minor Football Championship: 1972
