= 1983 Meath Senior Football Championship =

Meath S.F.C.
- Season: 1983
- Champions: Walterstown; 4th Senior Championship Title
- Relegated: n/a
- Leinster SCFC: Walterstown (Final) Walterstown 3-9, 2-11 Walsh Island
- All Ireland SCFC: Walterstown (Final) Nemo Rangers 2-10, 0-5 Walterstown
- Winning Captain: Gerry McLoughlin (Walterstown)
- Man of the Match: Frank O'Sullivann (Walterstown)
- Matches: 45

The 1983 Meath Senior Football Championship is the 91st edition of the Meath GAA's premier club Gaelic football tournament for senior graded teams in County Meath, Ireland. The tournament consists of 14 teams, with the winner going on to represent Meath in the Leinster Senior Club Football Championship. The championship starts with a group stage and then progresses to a knock out stage.

Walterstown were the defending champions after they defeated Summerhill in the previous years final, and they successfully defended their title when beating Navan O'Mahonys 0-10 to 1-4 in the final in Pairc Tailteann on 25 September 1983. This was their 4th S.F.C. success. Gerry McLoughlin raised the Keegan Cup for Walterstown while Frank O'Sullivan claimed the 'Man of the Match' award.

This was Kilmainhamwood's second period in the senior grade after claiming the 1982 Meath Intermediate Football Championship title.

After winning the Meath S.F.C. Walterstown went on to win the Leinster S.C.F.C. for the second time in their history and the third time for a Meath club to win, beating Walsh Island of Offaly in the final. They also reached their second All-Ireland S.C.F.C. final but lost out to Nemo Rangers of Cork. Walterstown are the only Meath side to have ever reached the All-Ireland final.

== Team changes ==
The following teams have changed division since the 1982 championship season.

=== To S.F.C. ===
Promoted from I.F.C.

- Kilmainhamwood - (Intermediate Champions)

=== From S.F.C. ===
Regraded to I.F.C.

- Dunshaughlin

== Group stage ==
=== Group A ===
Team	Pld	W	L	D	PF	PA	PD	Pts
Navan O'Mahonys	6	5	1	0	73	52	+21	10
Nobber	6	4	1	1	59	50	+9	9
Summerhill	6	3	2	1	71	49	+22	7
Seneschalstown	6	3	3	0	55	55	+0	6
Skryne	6	3	3	0	74	53	+19	6
Kilmainhamwood	6	1	5	0	39	74	-35	2
Martinstown/Athboy	6	0	6	0	40	77	-37	0

Round 1

- Navan O'Mahonys 1-10, 0-7 Seneschalstown, Duleek, 24/4/1983,
- Nobber 0-11, 1-8 Summerhill, Pairc Tailteann, 24/4/1983,
- Skryne 2-6, 0-6 Martinstown/Athboy, Martry, 24/4/1983,
- Kilmainhamwood - Bye,

Round 2

- Seneschalstown 1-12, 1-6 Kilmainhamwood, Castletown, 14/5/1983,
- Nobber 1-12, 0-6 Martinstown/Athboy, Kells, 22/5/1983,
- Summerhill 1-9, 2-4 Skryne, Trim, 22/5/1983,
- Navan O'Mahonys - Bye,

Round 3

- Navan O'Mahonys 0-10, 0-6 Kilmainhamwood, Kilberry, 22/5/1983,
- Skryne 3-8, 1-6 Nobber, Pairc Tailteann, 29/5/1983,
- Summerhill 0-10, 0-7 Martinstown/Athboy, Trim, 29/5/1983,
- Seneschalstown - Bye,

Round 4

- Seneschalstown 3-6, 1-11 Skryne, Stamullen, 17/6/1983,
- Nobber 0-13, 1-7 Navan O'Mahonys, Castletown, 19/6/1983,
- Kilmainhamwood 3-7, 0-10 Martinstown/Athboy, Martry, 19/6/1993,
- Summerhill - Bye,

Round 5

- Skryne 3-9, 0-5 Kilmainhamwood, Kilberry, 8/7/1983,
- Navan O'Mahonys 5-9, 1-8 Martinstown/Athboy, Martry, 13/7/1983,
- Seneschalstown 1-9, 0-8 Summerhill, Dunshaughlin, 31/7/1983,
- Nobber - Bye,

Round 6:

- Summerhill 1-18, 0-3 Kilmainhamwood, Pairc Tailteann, 22/7/1983,
- Navan O'Mahonys 0-6, 0-3 Skryne, Dunshaughlin, 29/7/1983,
- Nobber 1-8, 0-6 Seneschalstown, Pairc Tailteann, 21/8/1983,
- Martinstown/Athboy - Bye,

Round 7:

- Navan O'Mahonys 1-7, 0-9 Summerhill, Skryne, 21/8/1983,
- Nobber w/o, scr Kilmainhamwood,
- Seneschalstown w/o, scr Martinstown/Athboy,
- Skryne - Bye.

=== Group B ===
Team	Pld	W	L	D	PF	PA	PD	Pts
Walterstown	6	6	0	0	78	45	+33	12
Castletown	6	5	1	0	63	36	+27	10
St. Patrick's	6	3	2	1	52	56	-4	7
Trim	6	2	3	1	39	47	-8	5
Ballivor	6	2	4	0	51	46	+5	4
Syddan	6	2	4	0	36	50	-14	4
Gaeil Colmcille	6	0	6	0	24	54	-30	0

Round 1

- Ballivor 3-9, 1-4 Gaeil Colmcille, Kilberry, 17/4/1983,
- Castletown 1-10, 0-4 Syddan, Kells, 24/4/1983,
- Walterstown 1-6, 1-3 Trim, Skryne, 24/4/1983,
- St. Patrick's - Bye,

Round 2

- Walterstown 1-8, 1-7 Syddan, Castletown, 22/5/1983,
- Castletown 0-8, 0-3 Trim, Seneschalstown, 22/5/1983,
- St. Patrick's 1-8, 0-4 Ballivor, Pairc Tailteann, 22/5/1983,
- Gaeil Colmcille - Bye,

Round 3

- Walterstown 1-9, 0-4 Castletown, Kells, 29/5/1983,
- Syddan 3-8, 1-12 Trim, Kilberry, 25/5/1983,
- St. Patrick's 1-9, 1-4 Gaeil Colmcille, Pairc Tailteann, 22/5/1983,
- Ballivor - Bye,

Round 4

- Walterstown 1-12, 2-4 Ballivor, Pairc Tailteann, 17/6/1983,
- Castletown 0-12, 0-4 Gaeil Colmcille, Kilberry, 19/6/1983,
- Trim 3-6, 0-15 St. Patrick's, Seneschalstown, 19/6/1983,
- Syddan - Bye,

Round 5

- Walterstown 1-16, 0-9 St. Patrick's, Skryne, 8/7/1983,
- Ballivor 0-11, 0-5 Syddan, Pairc Tailteann, 10/7/1983,
- Trim w/o, scr Gaeil Colmcille, Athboy, 14/7/1983,
- Castletown - Bye,

Round 6:

- Castletown 2-9, 1-5 Ballivor, Martry, 17/7/1983,
- St. Patrick's w/o, scr Syddan, Pairc Tailteann, 17/7/1983,
- Walterstown 0-12, 0-6 Gaeil Colmcille, Martry, 22/7/1983,
- Trim - Bye,

Round 7:

- Castletown 1-8, 1-2 St. Patrick's, Skryne, 23/7/1983,
- Trim w/o, scr Ballivor,
- Syddan w/o, scr Gaeil Colmcille,
- Walterstown - Bye.

== Knock-out Stages ==
The winners and runners up of each group qualify for the semi-finals.

Semi-finals
1	Navan O'Mahonys	0-10
4	Castletown	0-6
3	Walterstown	0-9
2	Nobber	0-6

Final
Navan O'Mahonys	1-4
Walterstown	0-10

Semi-finals:

- Navan O'Mahonys 0-10, 0-6 Castletown, Pairc Tailteann, 11/9/1983,
- Walterstown 0-9, 0-6 Nobber, Pairc Tailteann, 11/9/1983,

Final:

- Walterstown 0-10, 1-4 Navan O'Mahonys, Pairc Tailteann, 25/9/1983,

== Leinster Senior Club Football Championship ==
Preliminary round:

- Walterstown w, l James Stephens, ???, ??/?/1982,

Quarter-final:

- Walterstown 3-11, 2-10 Johnstownbridge, Pairc Tailteann, 13/11/1983,

Semi-final:

- Walterstown 2-10, 3-5 Scoil Uí Chonaill, St. Conleth's Park, 27/11/1983,

Final:

- Walterstown 3-9, 2-11 Walsh Island, St. Conleth's Park, 11/12/1983.

== All-Ireland Senior Club Football Championship ==
Semi-final:

- Walterstown 3-6, 0-8 Burren, Kiltoom, 11/2/1984,

Final:

- Nemo Rangers 2-10, 0-5 Walterstown, Athlone, 12/2/1984.
