= Colm Coyle =

Irish Gaelic footballer and manager

Personal information
- Native name: Colm Mac Giolla Chomhaill (Irish)
- Born: 26 February 1963 (age 63) Seneschalstown, County Meath, Ireland

Sport
- Sport: Gaelic football
- Position: Back/ Forward
Club
- Years: Club
- Seneschalstown
Inter-county
- Years: County
- 1982–1998: Meath
Inter-county titles
- Leinster titles: 5
- All-Irelands: 3
- NFL: 2
- All Stars: 0

Colm Coyle (born 26 February 1963) is a former Gaelic football player and manager from County Meath, Ireland. He was manager of the senior Meath county team from September 2006 to July 2008, having previously played for the county team.

== Playing career ==
Coyle won a Leinster Minor Football Championship medal with Meath in 1980. He made his senior debut for Meath in the 1981–82 National League. He played inter-county football in the 1980s and 1990s on the Meath teams managed by Seán Boylan.

He was part of the Meath team which won the Leinster SFC title in 1986, Meath's first since 1970. Coyle then emigrated to America, thus being unavailable for Meath's successful Leinster SFC defense in 1987. He returned to Ireland prior the All-Ireland SFC semi-final and was a substitute as Meath won their first All-Ireland SFC title for 20 years in 1987. In 1988, when Meath retained the All-Ireland SFC, Coyle played as a half-back in the All-Ireland SFC final replay.

In 1996, he won his third All-Ireland SFC medal. In the final that year his late effort at a point fell short of the goals, but after bouncing went over the bar for a point to earn Meath a replay. Early in that replay Coyle was sent off for his involvement in a melee in which almost all players from both teams were involved. Meath went on to win.

For Meath he played at various times in the full-back line, half-back line, half-forward line and full-forward line. He played club football for Seneschalstown. During his playing career he won three All-Ireland SFC medals (1987, 1988 and 1996), as well as five Leinster SFC medals.

== Managerial career ==
Eamonn Barry became coach of the Meath football team for 2006, as successor to the long-time manager Seán Boylan. However, Meath did not perform well in the 2006 All-Ireland Senior Football Championship. The County Board accordingly appointed Coyle in his place on 11 September 2006, with Tommy Dowd and Dudley Farrell as selectors. Barry's response was 'I'm not a bit surprised. I've been well aware of the situation for the past couple of months'.

Coyle's reign started well, as Meath had some success in the Championship. They were knocked out of the Leinster SFC by eventual champions Dublin. However, they went on to reach the 2007 All-Ireland Senior Football Championship quarter-final through the Qualifiers, and notched up a notable victory over 2003 and 2005 champions Tyrone, who had won the Ulster Senior Football Championship. Cork beat Meath in the All-Ireland SFC semi-final by 1–16 to 0–9 in a game attended by only 38,000 people, but Coyle's team were regarded as having had a good year overall.

Meath beat Carlow by 20 points in an impressive start to the 2008 championship. However, they were knocked out of the Leinster SFC by Wexford. An emphatic defeat against Limerick followed, and Coyle resigned. On 10 November 2008, after a meeting with the county board, Eamonn O'Brien, one of Seán Boylan's selectors, was confirmed as Coyle's successor.

== Personal life ==
His father was from County Donegal.

Preceded by Eamonn Barry	Meath Senior Football Manager; 2007–2008	Succeeded by Eamonn O'Brien
