= Murt Duggan =

Irish hurler and selector (1940–2026)

Personal information
- Born: 27 November 1940 Gortnahoe, County Tipperary, Ireland
- Died: 11 April 2026 (aged 85) Ballingarry, County Tipperary, Ireland
- Occupation: Vet

Sport
- Sport: Hurling
- Position: Left wing-forward
Clubs
- Years: Club
- Gortnahoe–Glengoole, Ballingarry
Club titles
- Tipperary titles: 0
College
- Years: College
- University College Dublin
College titles
- Fitzgibbon titles: 4

Murt Duggan (27 November 1940 – 11 April 2026) was an Irish hurling selector and player. At club level he played with Gortnahoe–Glengoole and Ballingarry, and also served as a selector with the Tipperary senior hurling team.

== Career ==
Duggan first played hurling at juvenile and underage levels with the Gortnahoe–Glengoole club. His performances with the club earned a call-up to the Tipperary minor hurling team and he was wing-forward on the team that beat Kilkenny to win the All-Ireland MHC title in 1959. Duggan later lined out with the Ballingarry club.

In retirement from playing, Duggan became involved in team management and coaching. He was a selector under manager Len Gaynor when the Tipperary were beaten by Clare in the 1997 All-Ireland final.

== Death ==
Duggan did in Ballingarry, County Tipperary on 11 April 2026.

== Honours ==
University College Dublin

- Fitzgibbon Cup (4): 1960, 1961, 1964, 1965 (c)

Tipperary

- All-Ireland Minor Hurling Championship (1): 1959
- Munster Minor Hurling Championship (1): 1959
