= Moynalvey GAA =

Gaelic games club in County Meath, Ireland

Moynalvey
- Magh nAilbhe
- Founded: 1934
- County: Meath
- Colours: Maroon and White
- Grounds: Kilmore Park

Playing kits
Standard colours

Senior Club Championships
	All Ireland	Leinster champions	Meath champions
Football:	0	0	0

Moynalvey (Irish: Magh nAilbhe) is a Gaelic Athletic Association club based in the parish of Moynalvey and Kiltale. The parish is located 5 km from Summerhill and 17 km from Dunboyne. Moynalvey parish has a population of approximately 1,700 people. The club grounds are located in Kilmore.

== Honours ==
- Meath Intermediate Football Championship (2): 1983, 2011
- Meath Junior Football Championship (2): 1981, 2008
- Feis Cup (1): 1993
