= 1982 Meath Senior Football Championship =

Meath S.F.C.
- Season: 1982
- Champions: Walterstown; 3rd Senior Championship Title
- Relegated: Dunshaughlin
- Leinster SCFC: Summerhill (preliminary round) Athlone 2-5 Summerhill 1-5,
- All Ireland SCFC: n/a
- Winning Captain: Eamonn O'Brien (Walterstown)
- Man of the Match: Neil O'Sullivan (Walterstown)
- Matches: 52

The 1982 Meath Senior Football Championship is the 90th edition of the Meath GAA's premier club Gaelic football tournament for senior graded teams in County Meath, Ireland. The tournament consists of 14 teams, with the winner going on to represent Meath in the Leinster Senior Club Football Championship. The championship starts with a group stage and then progresses to a knock out stage.

Navan O'Mahonys were the defending champions after they defeated Skryne in the previous years final, however they lost their crown when losing to eventual champions Walterstown after a Semi-final replay.

This was Ballivor's third period in the senior grade after claiming the 1981 Meath Intermediate Football Championship title.

On 31 October 1982, Walterstown claimed their 3rd Senior Championship title, when defeating Summerhill 1-7 to 0-5 in Pairc Tailteann, Navan. Eamonn O'Brien raised the Keegan Cup for Walterstown while Neil O'Sullivan claimed the 'Man of the Match' award.

== Team changes ==
The following teams have changed division since the 1981 championship season.

=== To S.F.C. ===
Promoted from I.F.C.

- Ballivor - (Intermediate Champions)

=== From S.F.C. ===
Regraded to I.F.C.

- n/a

== Group stage ==
=== Group A ===
Team	Pld	W	L	D	PF	PA	PD	Pts
Navan O'Mahonys	6	5	1	0	67	61	+6	10
St. Patrick's	6	5	1	0	44	35	+9	10
Castletown	6	5	1	0	70	47	+23	10
Skryne	6	3	3	0	68*	51*	+17*	6
Syddan	6	2	4	0	43	62	-19	4
Seneschalstown	6	1	5	0	70	77	-7	2
Ballivor	6	0	6	0	35*	64*	-29*	0

Round 1

- Castletown 2-8, 0-7 Navan O'Mahonys, Martry, 18/4/1982,
- St. Patrick's 0-7, 0-2 Skryne, Duleek, 18/4/1982,
- Syddan 1-8, 1-3 Seneschalstown, Pairc Tailteann, 18/4/1982,
- Ballivor - Bye,

Round 2

- Navan O'Mahonys 2-4, 0-5 Ballivor, Athboy, 2/5/1982,
- St. Patrick's 0-9, 0-7 Syddan, Pairc Tailteann, 2/5/1982,
- Skryne 4-8, 1-9 Seneschalstown, Duleek, 2/5/1982,
- Castletown - Bye,

Round 3

- Skryne 5-10, 1-2 Syddan, Pairc Tailteann, 23/5/1982,
- St. Patrick's 0-5, 0-2 Seneschalstown, Duleek, 23/5/1982,
- Castletown 2-6, 1-7 Ballivor, Kells, 30/5/1982,
- Navan O'Mahonys - Bye,

Round 4

- Syddan 2-6, 1-6 Ballivor, Kells, 6/6/1982,
- St. Patrick's 0-10, 0-7 Castletown, Skryne, 6/6/1982,
- Navan O'Mahonys 3-6, 2-7 Seneschalstown, Kilberry, 6/6/1982,
- Skryne - Bye,

Round 5

- Castletown 2-7, 1-5 Syddan, Kells, 4/7/1982,
- Navan O'Mahonys 3-9, 1-13 Skryne, Seneschalstown, 11/7/1982,
- Seneschalstown 4-18, 3-2 Ballivor, Trim, 11/7/1982,
- St. Patrick's - Bye,

Round 6:

- Castletown 2-9, 1-4 Seneschalstown, Pairc Tailteann, 25/7/1982,
- Skryne w, l Ballivor, Pairc Tailteann, 25/7/1982,
- Navan O'Mahonys 1-14, 2-7 St. Patrick's, Dunshaughlin, 1/8/1982,
- Syddan - Bye,

Round 7:

- Navan O'Mahonys w/o, scr Syddan, Kilberry, 22/8/1982,
- Castletown 2-3, 0-5 Skryne, Seneschalstown, 22/8/1982,
- St. Patrick's w/o, scr Ballivor,
- Seneschalstown - Bye,

Semi-final Play-offs:

- Navan O'Mahonys 0-10, 0-4 St. Patrick's, Seneschalstown, 29/8/1982,
- St. Patrick's 2-10, 1-1 Castletown, Seneschalstown, 5/9/1982,

=== Group B ===
Team	Pld	W	L	D	PF	PA	PD	Pts
Summerhill	6	5	1	0	84	33	+51	10
Walterstown	6	5	1	0	66	34	+32	10
Nobber	6	5	1	0	78	51	+27	10
Trim	6	3	3	0	39*	47*	-8*	6
Martinstown/Athboy	6	2	4	0	41*	64*	-23*	4
Gaeil Colmcille	6	1	5	0	35	87	-52	2
Dunshaughlin	6	0	6	0	23	46	-23	0

Round 1

- Gaeil Colmcille 0-7, 0-6 Dunshaughlin, Pairc Tailteann, 28/3/1982,
- Nobber 1-6, 0-8 Walterstown, Kells, 18/4/1982,
- Summerhill 4-7, 1-4 Martinstown/Athboy, Trim, 2/5/1982,
- Trim - Bye,

Round 2

- Nobber 2-6, 2-3 Trim, Kilberry, 25/4/1982,
- Summerhill 0-13, 0-5 Dunshaughlin, Kilmessan, 9/5/1982,
- Martinstown/Athboy 0-8, 1-3 Gaeil Colmcille, Kilskyre, 23/5/1982,
- Walterstown - Bye,

Round 3

- Walterstown 2-9, 1-2 Trim, Athboy, 6/6/1982,
- Summerhill 1-17, 0-1 Gaeil Colmcille, Kildalkey, 6/6/1982,
- Martinstown/Athboy 1-9, 0-5 Dunshaughlin, Trim, 6/6/1982,
- Nobber - Bye,

Round 4

- Nobber 1-11, 1-4 Dunshaughlin, Seneschalstown, 27/6/1982,
- Trim 1-13, 0-5 Gaeil Colmcille, Kilskyre, 27/6/1982,
- Walterstown 0-10, 1-3 Martinstown/Athboy, Kilmessan, 11/7/1982,
- Summerhill - Bye,

Round 5

- Summerhill 1-7, 0-4 Nobber, Pairc Tailteann, 11/7/1982,
- Trim w/o, scr Dunshaughlin, Skryne, 11/7/1982,
- Walterstown 3-13, 0-7 Gaeil Colmcille, Martry, 25/7/1982,
- Martinstown/Athboy - Bye,

Round 6:

- Nobber 2-18, 1-5 Martinstown/Athboy, Kilberry, 18/7/1982,
- Summerhill 1-12, 2-3 Trim, Pairc Tailteann, 18/7/1982,
- Walterstown w/o, scr Dunshaughlin,
- Gaeil Colmcille - Bye,

Round 7:

- Nobber 1-12, 1-6 Gaeil Colmcille, Kilberry, 13/8/1982,
- Walterstown 1-8, 1-4 Summerhill, Kilcloon, 15/8/1982,
- Trim w, l Martinstown/Athboy,
- Dunshaughlin - Bye,

Semi-final Play-offs:

- Summerhill 1-4, 0-7 Walterstown, Pairc Tailteann, 29/8/1982,
- Summerhill 1-9, 1-6 Walterstown, Skryne, 5/9/1982,
- Walterstown 1-9, 1-9 Nobber, Pairc Tailteann, 12/9/1982,
- Walterstown 0-12, 1-6 Nobber, Pairc Tailteann, 26/9/1982,

== Knock-out Stages ==
The winners and runners up of each group qualify for the semi-finals.

Semi-finals
1	Navan O'Mahonys	0-5 R
4	Walterstown	0-6 R
3	Summerhill	2-10
2	St. Patrick's	0-6

Final
Walterstown	1-7
Summerhill	0-5

Semi-finals:

- Summerhill 2-10, 0-6 St. Patrick's, Pairc Tailteann, 12/9/1982,
- Walterstown 0-10, 1-7 Navan O'Mahonys, Kells, 26/9/1982,

Semi-final Replay:

- Walterstown 0-6, 0-5 Navan O'Mahonys, Kells, 17/10/1982,

Final:

- Walterstown 1-7, 0-5 Summerhill, Pairc Tailteann, 31/10/1982,

== Leinster Senior Club Football Championship ==
Preliminary round:

- Athlone 2-5, 1-5 Summerhill, Athlone, 17/10/1982,
