= 1972 All-Ireland Minor Football Championship =

Gaelic football competition

Championship details

All-Ireland Champions
- Winning team: Cork (5th win)

All-Ireland Finalists
- Losing team: Tyrone

Provincial Champions
- Munster: Cork
- Leinster: Meath
- Ulster: Tyrone
- Connacht: Galway

The 1972 All-Ireland Minor Football Championship was the 41st staging of the All-Ireland Minor Football Championship, the Gaelic Athletic Association's premier inter-county Gaelic football tournament for boys under the age of 18.

Mayo entered the championship as defending champions, however, they were defeated in the Connacht Championship.

On 24 September 1972, Cork won the championship following a 3-11 to 2-11 defeat of Tyrone in the All-Ireland final. This was their fifth All-Ireland title overall and their first in three championship seasons.

== Results ==
=== Connacht Minor Football Championship ===
Quarter-final

1972 Quarter-final	Galway	2-11 - 2-07	Sligo	McHale Park, Castlebar

Semi-finals

1972 Semi-final	Roscommon	2-10 - 1-08	Mayo	Dr Hyde Park, Roscommon

1972 Semi-final	Galway	2-10 - 0-05	Leitrim	St Jarlath's Park, Tuam

Final

16 July 1972 Final	Galway	4-11 - 1-11	Roscommon	McHale Park, Castlebar

=== Leinster Minor Football Championship ===
First round

1972 First round	Laois	4-12 - 2-08	Kilkenny	Nowlan Park, Kilkenny

1972 First round	Carlow	0-06 - 2-11	Wexford	Nowlan Park, Kilkenny

Second round

1972 Second round	Dublin	4-09 - 3-06	Westmeath	Trim

1972 Second round	Longford	0-06 - 1-10	Wicklow	O'Moore Park, Portlaoise

Third round

1972 Third round	Laois	1-07 - 1-08	Wexford	Dr Cullen Park, Carlow

1972 Third round	Louth	1-09 - 2-07	Wicklow	Croke Park, Dublin

Quarter-finals

1972 Quarter-final	Meath	2-15 - 3-04	Wicklow	Croke Park, Dublin

1972 Quarter-final	Kidare	1-06 - 1-17	Wexford	Dr Cullen Park, Carlow

Semi-finals

1972 Semi-final	Dublin	1-11 - 0-06	Wexford	Dr Cullen Park, Carlow

1972 Semi-final	Meath	1-11 - 0-07	Offaly	O'Moore Park, Portlaoise

Final

23 July 1972 Final	Meath	3-08 - 1-10	Dublin	Croke Park, Dublin

=== Munster Minor Football Championship ===
Quarter-finals

1972 Quarter-final	Limerick	2-05 - 0-12	Waterford	FitzGerald Park, Kilmallock

1972 Quarter-final	Tipperary	2-10 - 0-02	Clare	Gaelic Grounds, Limerick

Semi-finals

1972 Semi-final	Cork	1-14 - 0-08	Waterford	Midleton

1972 Semi-final	Tipperary	2-07 - 2-12	Kerry	Páirc MacGearailt, Fermoy

Final

16 July 1972 Final	Cork	2-14 - 1-14	Kerry	Fitzgerald Stadium, Killarney

=== Ulster Minor Football Championship ===
Quarter-finals

1972 Quarter-final	Donegal	1-11 - 2-12	Monaghan	St. Molaise Park, Irvinestown

1972 Quarter-final	Derry	1-05 - 0-05	Antrim	Dean McGlinchey Park, Ballinascreen

Semi-finals

1972 Semi-final	Cavan	0-10 - 1-06	Down	St. Tiernach's Park, Clones

1972 Semi-final	Derry	1-07 - 1-15	Tyrone	O'Neill Park, Dungannon

Final

30 July 1972 Final	Cavan	1-06 - 3-06	Tyrone	St. Tiernach's Park, Clones

=== All-Ireland Minor Football Championship ===
Semi-finals

13 August 1972 Semi-final	Cork	2-08 - 0-11	Galway	Croke Park, Dublin
	J Ahern 1-2, S Ó Sé 1-0, L Goode 0-2, R Wilmot 0-1, D O'Hare 0-1, J Barry-Murphy 0-1.		J Duffy 0-5, D Smyth 0-2, M Hughes 0-1, K Clancy 0-1, T Mullins 0-1, M Conroy 0-1.	Referee: P Devlin (Tyrone)

20 August 1972 Semi-final	Tyrone	3-10 - 0-10	Meath	Croke Park, Dublin
	M Harte 1-3, F McGuigan 1-2, J Cunningham 1-0, J Hughes 0-2, P Quinn 0-1, M Quinn 0-1, B O'Neill 0-1.		E O'Brien 0-4, B McGuinness 0-3, J Kennedy 0-1, M Ryan 0-1, G Dempsey 0-1.	Referee: J Dennigan (Cork)

Final

24 September 1972 Final	Cork	3-11 - 2-11	Tyrone	Croke Park, Dublin
	J Barry-Murphy 2-1, J Ahern 0-5, L Goode 1-1, L Gould 0-3, D O'Hare 0-1.		M Harte 1-0, M Quinn 1-0, J Hughes 0-5, P McGuigan 0-4, B O'Neill 0-2.	Referee: M Hayden (Roscommon)
