= Walterstown GFC =

Gaelic games club in County Meath, Ireland

Walterstown GFC, Navan
- Baile an Bhailtearaigh
- Founded: 1902
- County: Meath
- Colours: Black
- Grounds: Oldtown, Navan

Playing kits
Standard colours

Senior Club Championships
	All Ireland	Leinster champions	Meath champions
Football:	0	2	5

Walterstown GFC is a Gaelic Athletic Association football club based in Navan, County Meath in Ireland. The club fields Gaelic football teams in Meath GAA and Leinster competitions. The club has won the Meath Senior Football Championship five times and the Leinster Senior Club championship twice.

== History ==
Walterstown GFC was founded in 1902 and one of the first mentions of the club was when they entered a Dunshaughlin tournament in aid of the parochial house. The club won the first two Senior Football Championships in 1887 and 1888 under the name Dowdstown GAA. In the late 1970s and 1980s, the club won more titles and are the only club from Meath to have won a Leinster Senior Club Football Championship twice.

As of 2024, the club provides Girls/Ladies football at various underage (U6 to U16), U19 and Senior levels as well as Boys/Mens football at underage (U6 to U18), U21 and Senior levels.

== Honours ==
- Meath Senior Football Championship (5): 1978, 1980, 1982, 1983, 1984
- Leinster Senior Club Football Championship (2): 1980, 1983
- Feis Cup (3): 1969, 1986, 1988
- Meath Intermediate Football Championship (1): 1964
- Meath Junior Football Championship (2): 1961, 1978

Preceded by Walterstown	Meath Senior Football Champions; 1984	Succeeded by Navan O'Mahonys

Preceded by Portlaoise	Leinster Senior Club Football Champions; 1984	Succeeded by St Vincents
