= Ballysadare =

Town in County Sligo, Ireland

Ballysadare Baile Easa Dara
- Town
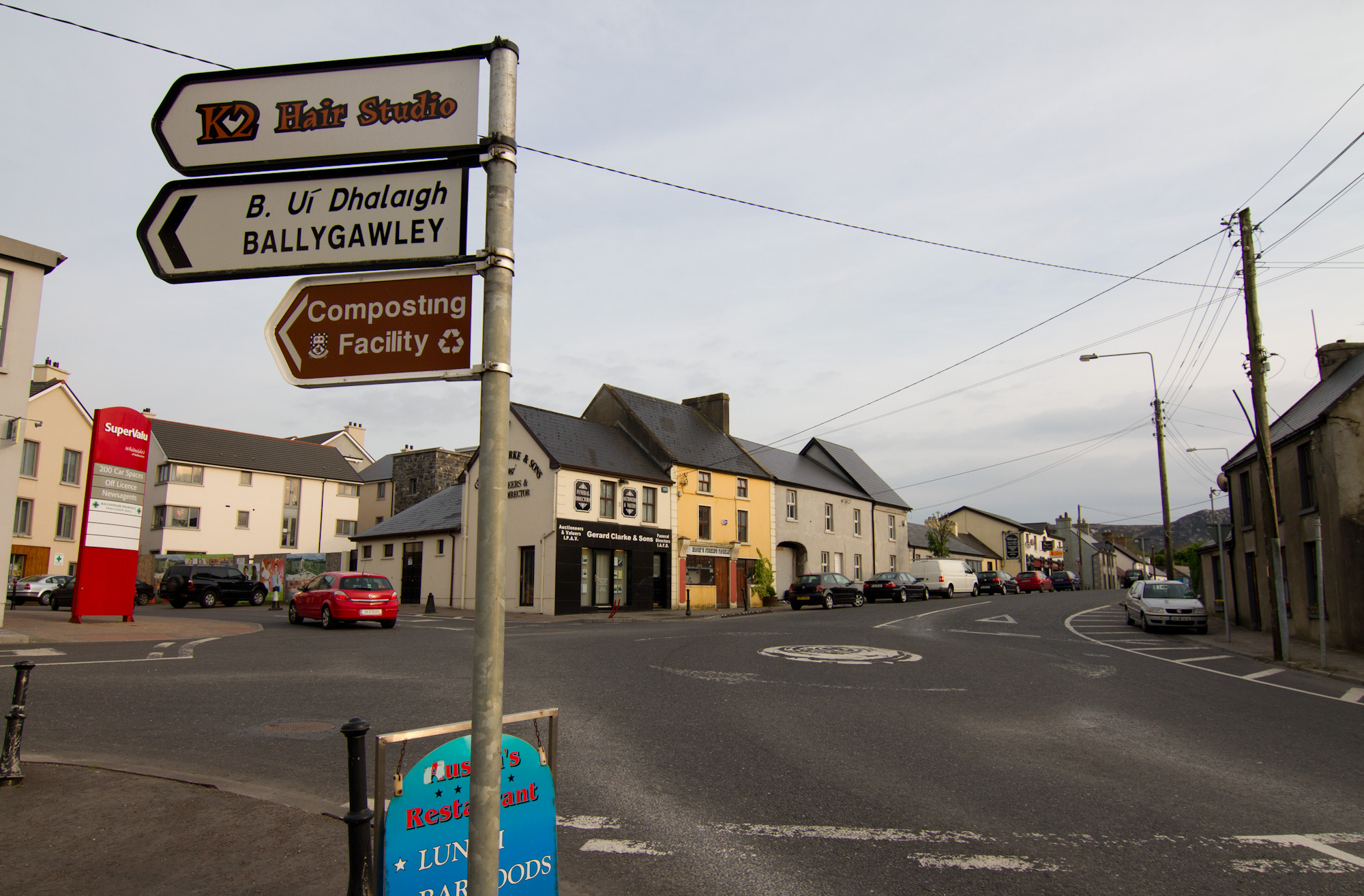
- Ballysadare's main street

- Location in Ireland
- Coordinates: 54°12′42″N 8°30′34″W
- Country: Ireland
- Province: Connacht
- County: County Sligo
- Elevation: 55 m (180 ft)

Population (2022)
  - Total: 1,747
- Time zone: UTC+0 (WET)
  - Summer (DST): UTC-1 (IST (WEST))
- Irish Grid Reference: G668293

Ballysadare (Irish: Baile Easa Dara, meaning 'town of the waterfall of the oak'), locally also Ballisodare, is a town in County Sligo, Ireland. It is about 7 km (4 mi) south of Sligo town. The town developed on an important crossing of the Owenmore River. Ballysadare is in a townland and civil parish of the same name.

== History ==
=== Toponymy ===
The Ox Mountains (Irish: Sliabh Gamh) are located west of the town. The town itself is named after the falls on the Owenmore River. Ballysadare is in the barony of Leyny formerly the túath of Luighne Connacht, and the barony of Tirerril, formerly the túath of Tír Olloíl. The Owenmore river forms the border between the baronies. Ballysadare also borders two other baronies in County Sligo, Carbury to the North and Tireragh to the West. Ballysadare is in the diocese of Achonry.

Alternative names for the falls are Eas Mac Modairn (Falls of the son of Modarn) and Eas na nÉan (The Falls of the Bird).

There appear to be three variants of English version of the settlement name still in use, Ballysadare being on the road signs coming to dominate. The use of Ballisodare remains in evidence on the names of some local sport clubs and even on at least one Sligo County Council document in 2018. Ballysodare appears to have been used for the railway station and there is evidence of its use on a map of 1887 and indexing of parish registers at the National Library of Ireland.

=== Early history ===
Ballysadare is a possible location for the town noted as Nagnata on Claudius Ptolemy's 2nd century CE co-ordinate map of the world. Ballysadare was anciently a major gathering place for all surrounding districts.

St. Columba visited Ballysadare in 575 AD at which "Before the Saint (Columba) returned to Britain he founded one church in the district of Carbury, and proceeded from thence to a place called Easdara, where all the prelates of the neighbouring regions, and vast numbers of holy men and women had come to meet him; and, to say nothing of the rest of the multitude, which was almost beyond counting, a great many distinguished saints of the race of Cumne are recorded to have been present." This extract is from Colgans Acta Sanctorum Hiberniae.

The O'Hara were the lords of Lúighne.

=== Saint Féichín ===
St Féichín was born in the townland of Billa in the parish of Ballysadare. He is said to have studied under St. Nath Í of Achonry further to the south in the same territory. The word Bile means a sacred tree or grove. The townland is the location of the Leaba St. Féichín or St. Feichins bed. The town developed near a church founded by St. Féichín, some time before he died in 664 AD (O’Rorke 1878, 1–4).This monastic site is in Kilboglashy townland and the remains consist of a stone church known as the Great Temple of St. Féichín (Teampal mór Féichín), with a later Romanesque style carved doorway, two small buildings and a graveyard. The O'Duillenain, were erenachs of Ballysadare.

The Canons Regular of St. Augustine built a new priory a short distance to the west in Abbeytown Townland in the 13th century. Ballysadare was mentioned in the Annals of the Four Masters 15 times between 1158 and 1602, in 1188, 1199, 1228, 1230, 1235, 1239, 1249, 1261, 1267, 1285, 1360, 1444, 1595 and 1602. In 1360, the Annals of the Four Masters note: A bridge of lime and stone was built by Cathal O’Conor across the river of Eas-dara. In 1588, all monastery lands around Ballysadare were seized by the Dublin Castle government on behalf of the Crown.

=== Mines ===
Ballysadare is the site of an ancient silver and lead mine, re-opened and worked in the 19th and 20th century. It is now the site of a quarry.

=== Recent history ===
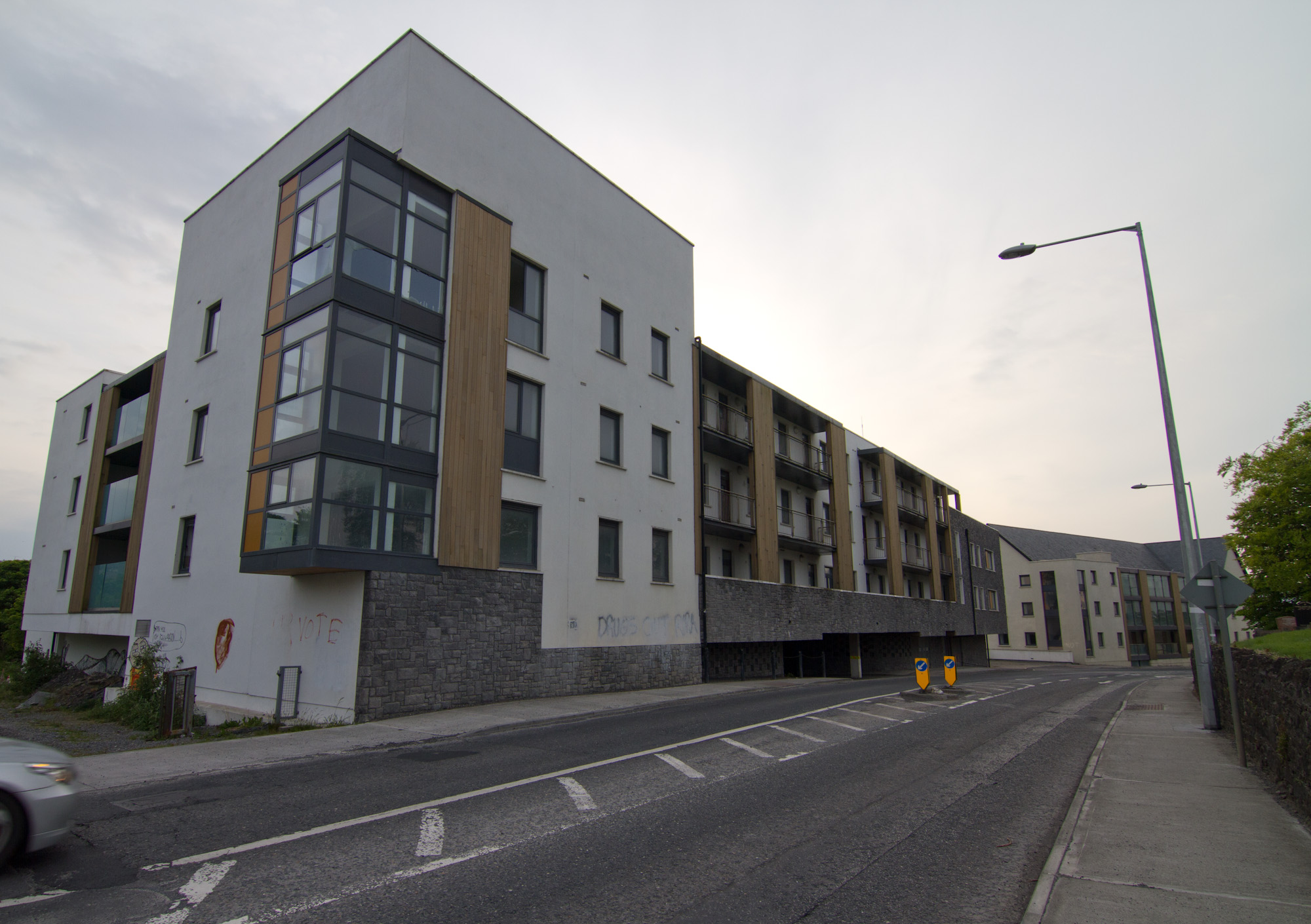
Modern apartment development

Ballysadare was the location of a Pollexfen Mills, since demolished. There is also a hydro electric power station in the vicinity.

The area experienced rapid development during the 'Celtic Tiger' boom, with the population almost trebling in the period between the 1996 and 2022 census (from 612 to 1,747 people). During this period several new housing estates were developed, several of which subsequently remained empty, creating ghost estates. The town was bypassed by the N4 Sligo-Collooney dual-carriageway, completed in January 1998. The N59 Ballina-Sligo road still winds through the town.

== Education ==
It is home to St. Mary's College, a secondary school which serves the southern and western environs of County Sligo, including the surrounding areas of Collooney and Coolaney. There is also St. John's primary school which serves the surrounding area.

== Transport ==
Ballysodare railway station was located on the Dublin-Sligo railway line but it is now demolished; it was also served by the Sligo, Leitrim and Northern Counties Railway from Manorhamilton and the route from Tubbercurry.

== Gallery ==
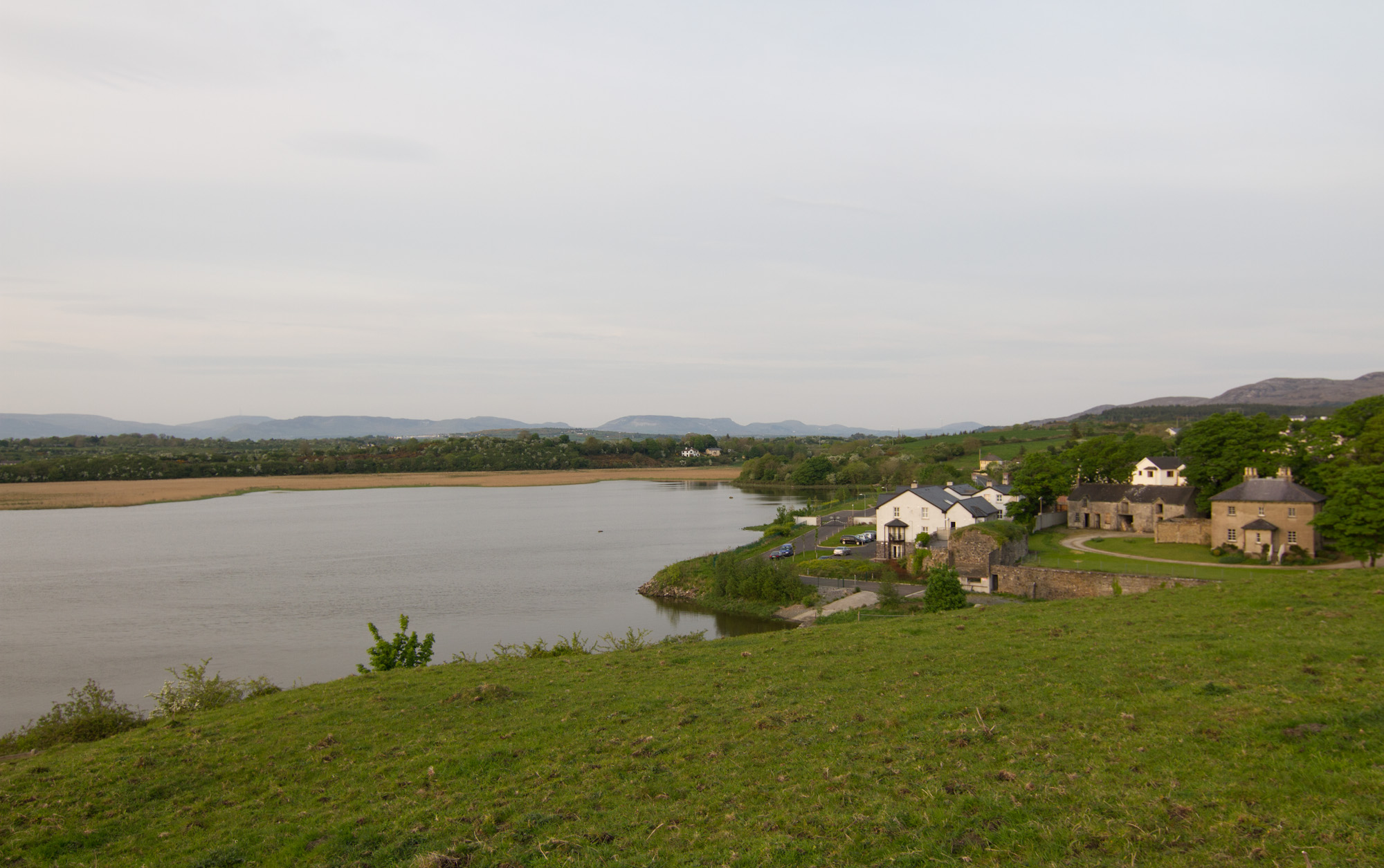
Ballysadare Bay

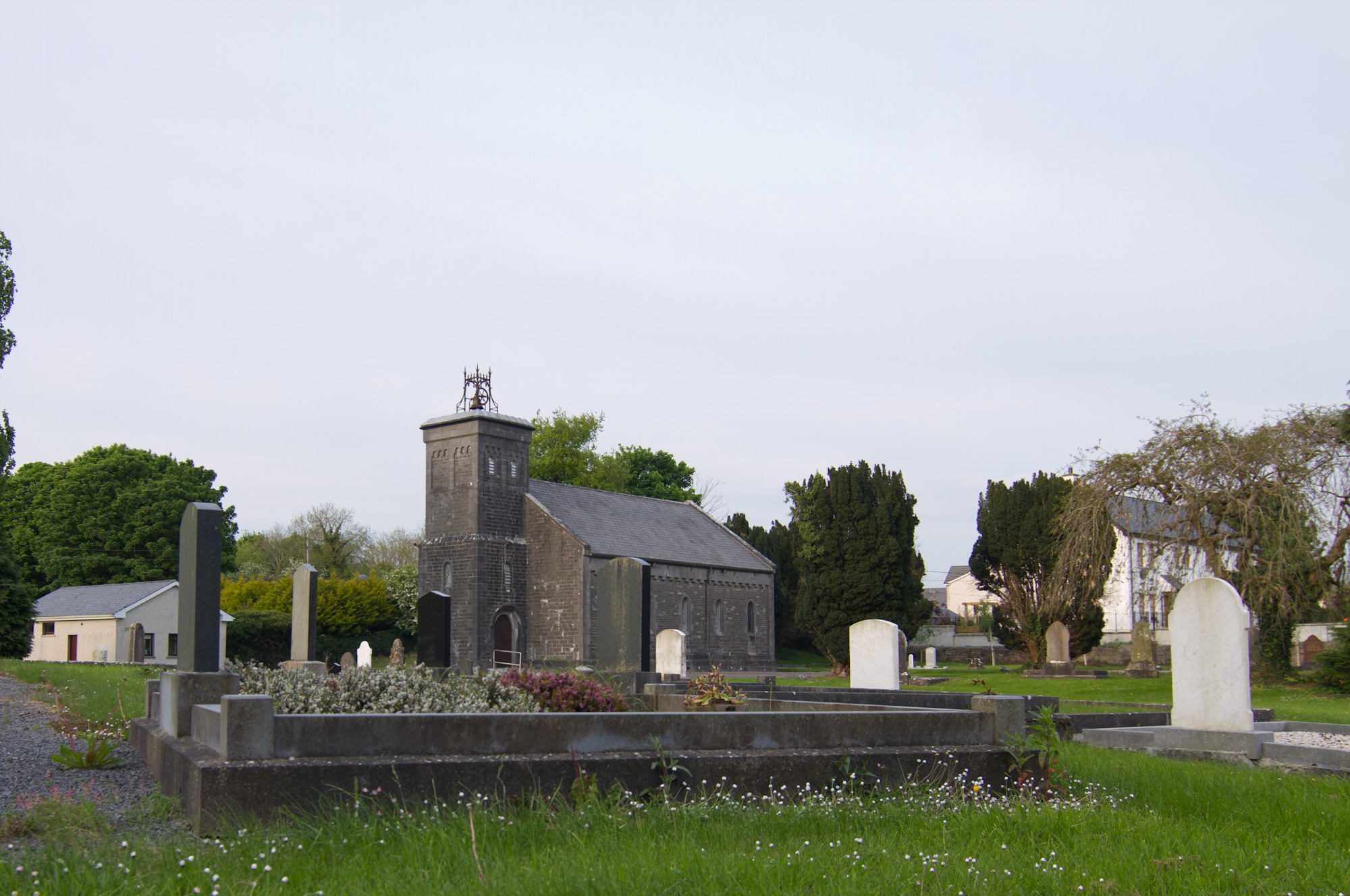
Holy Trinity Parish Church, Church of Ireland

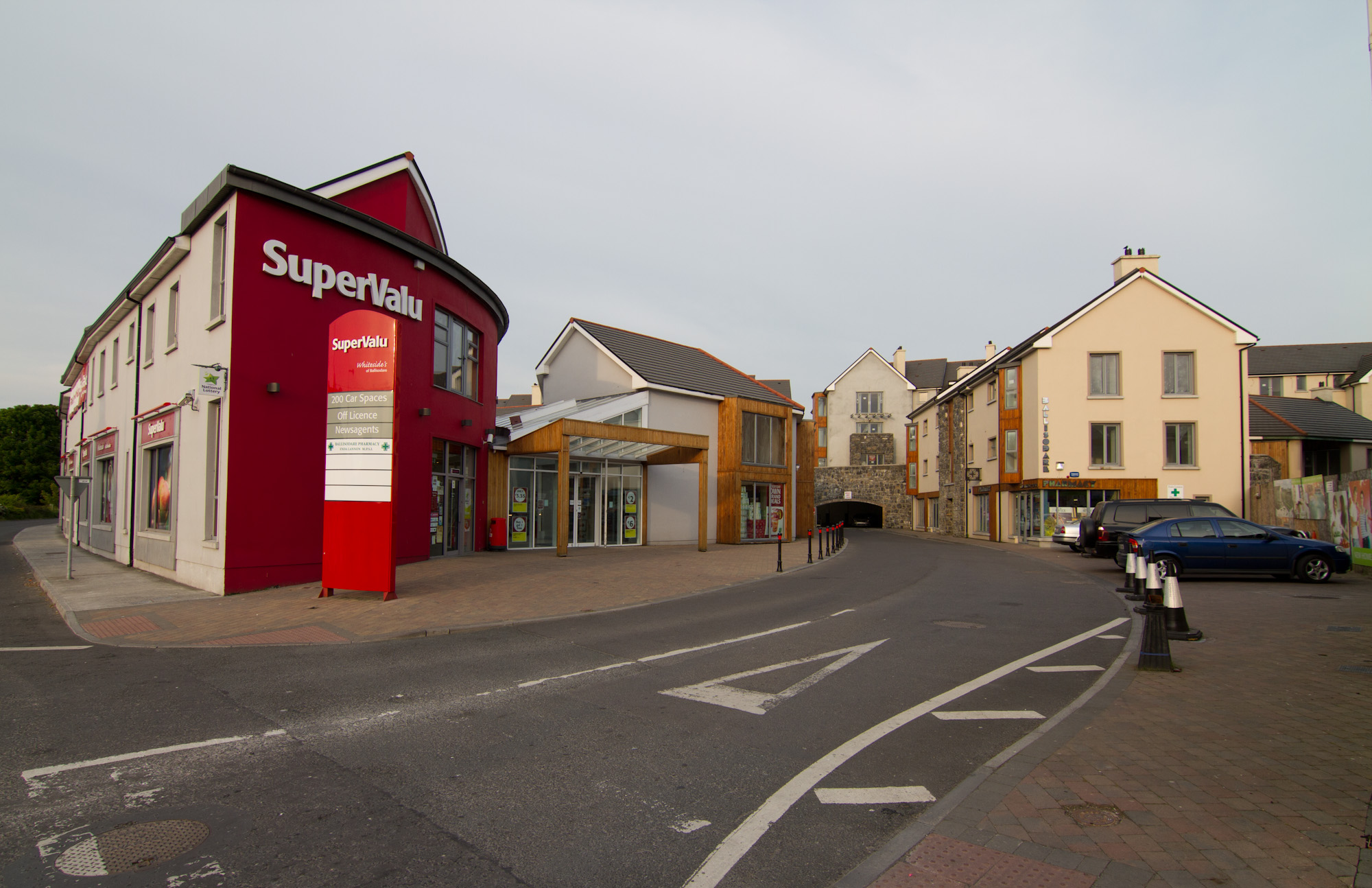
New development in the town

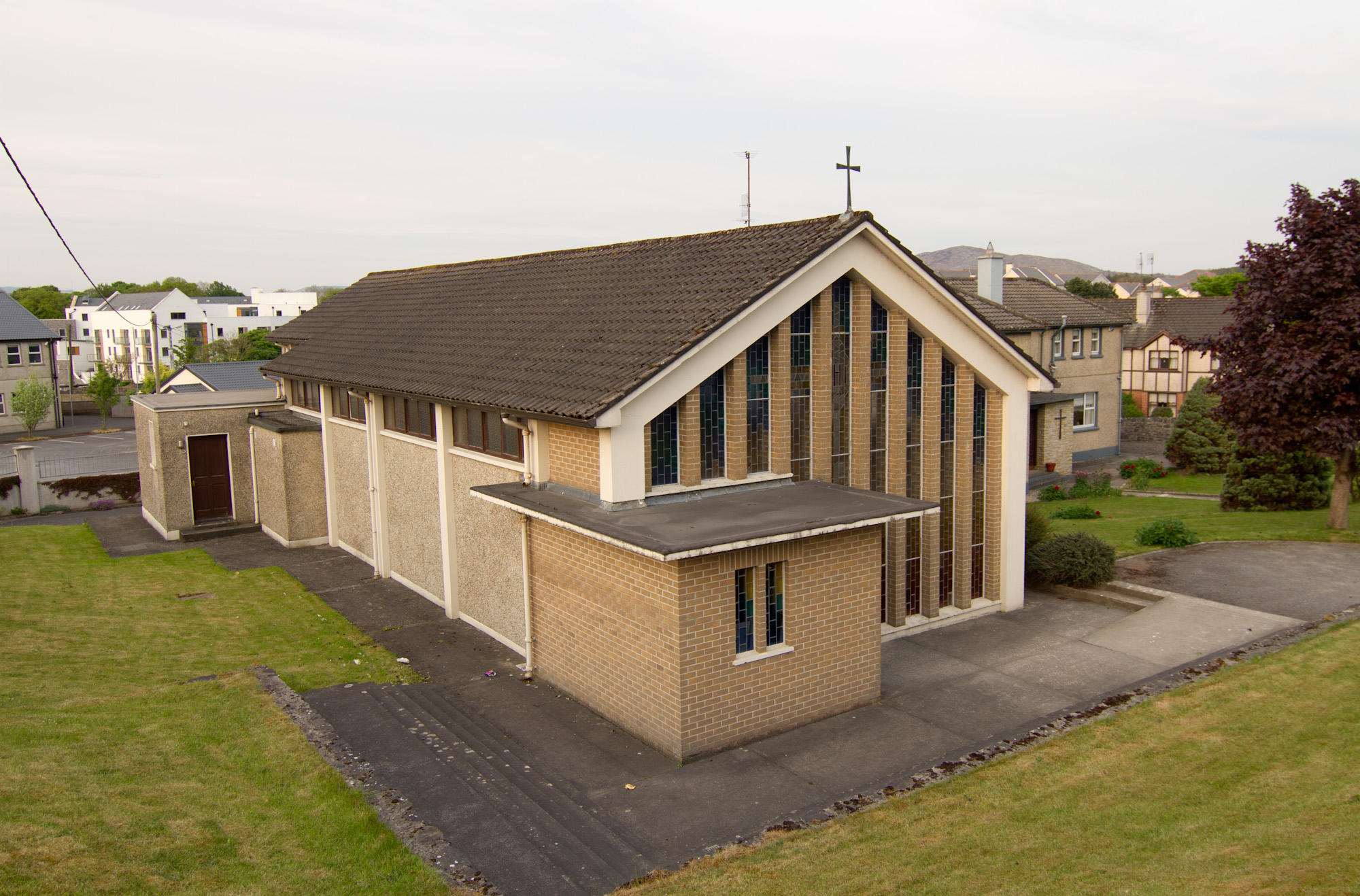
Ballysadare Roman Catholic church

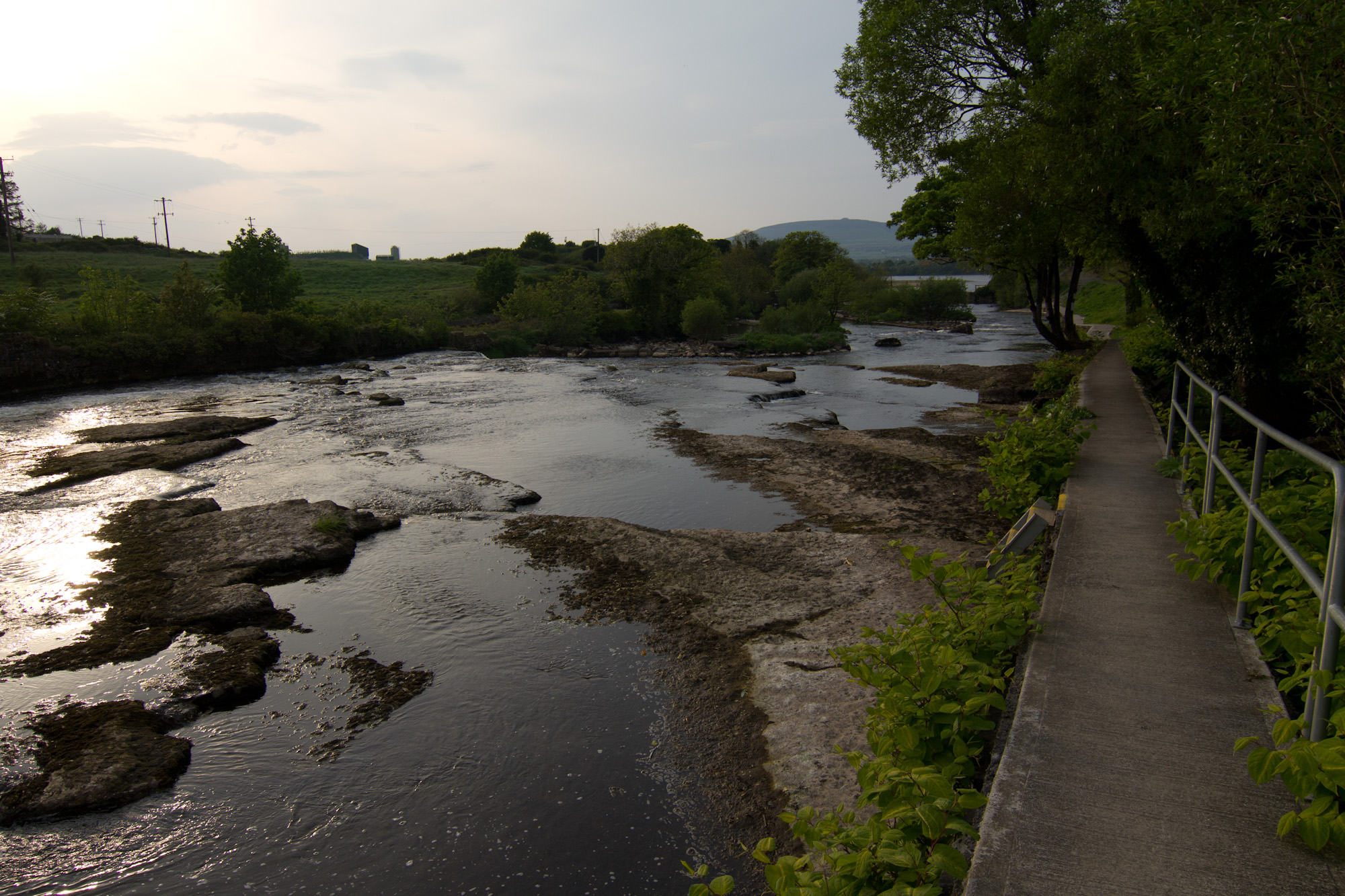
Ballysadare river

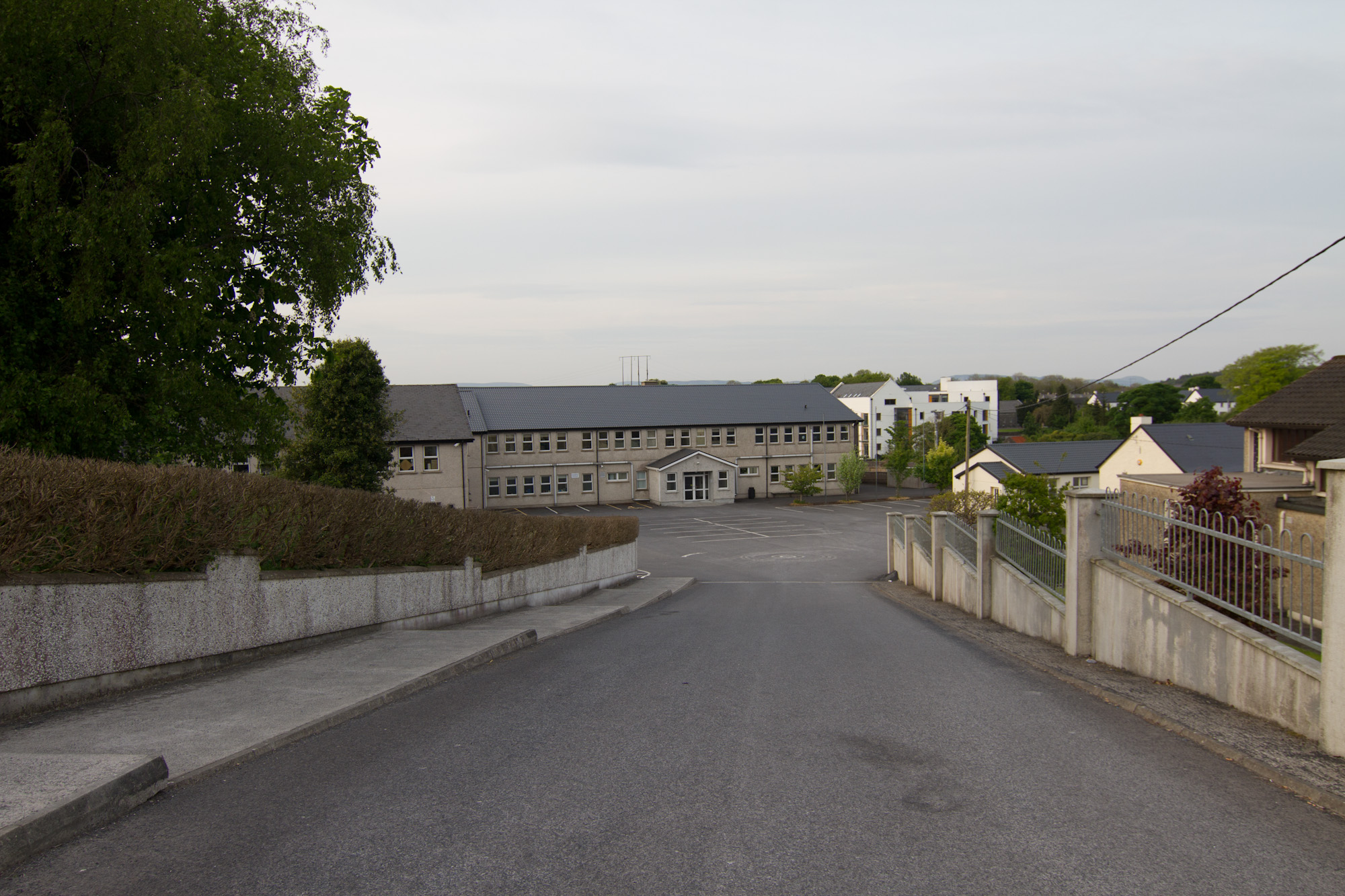
St. Mary's College - A catholic voluntary co-educational secondary school

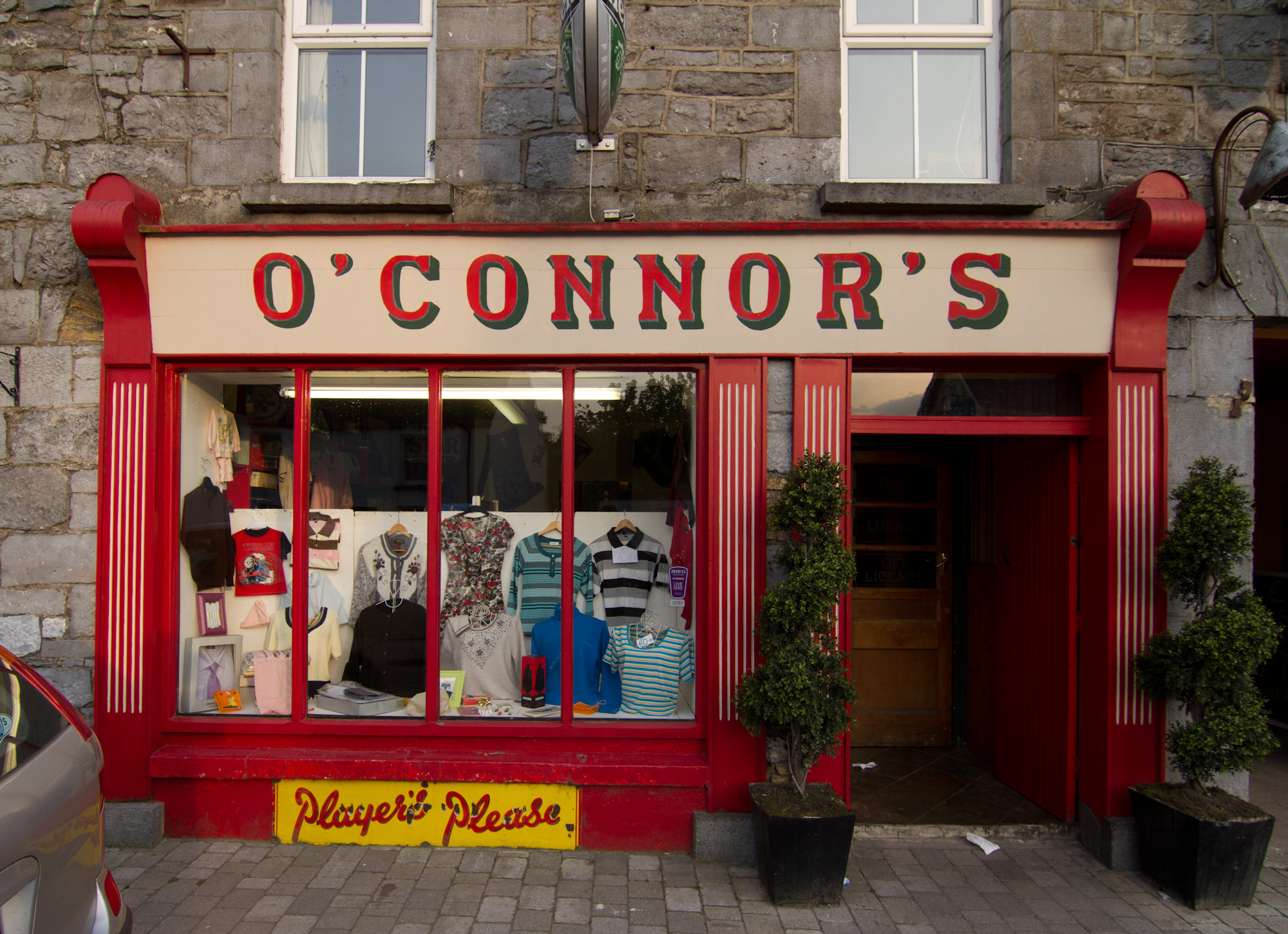
Older shop in Ballysadare

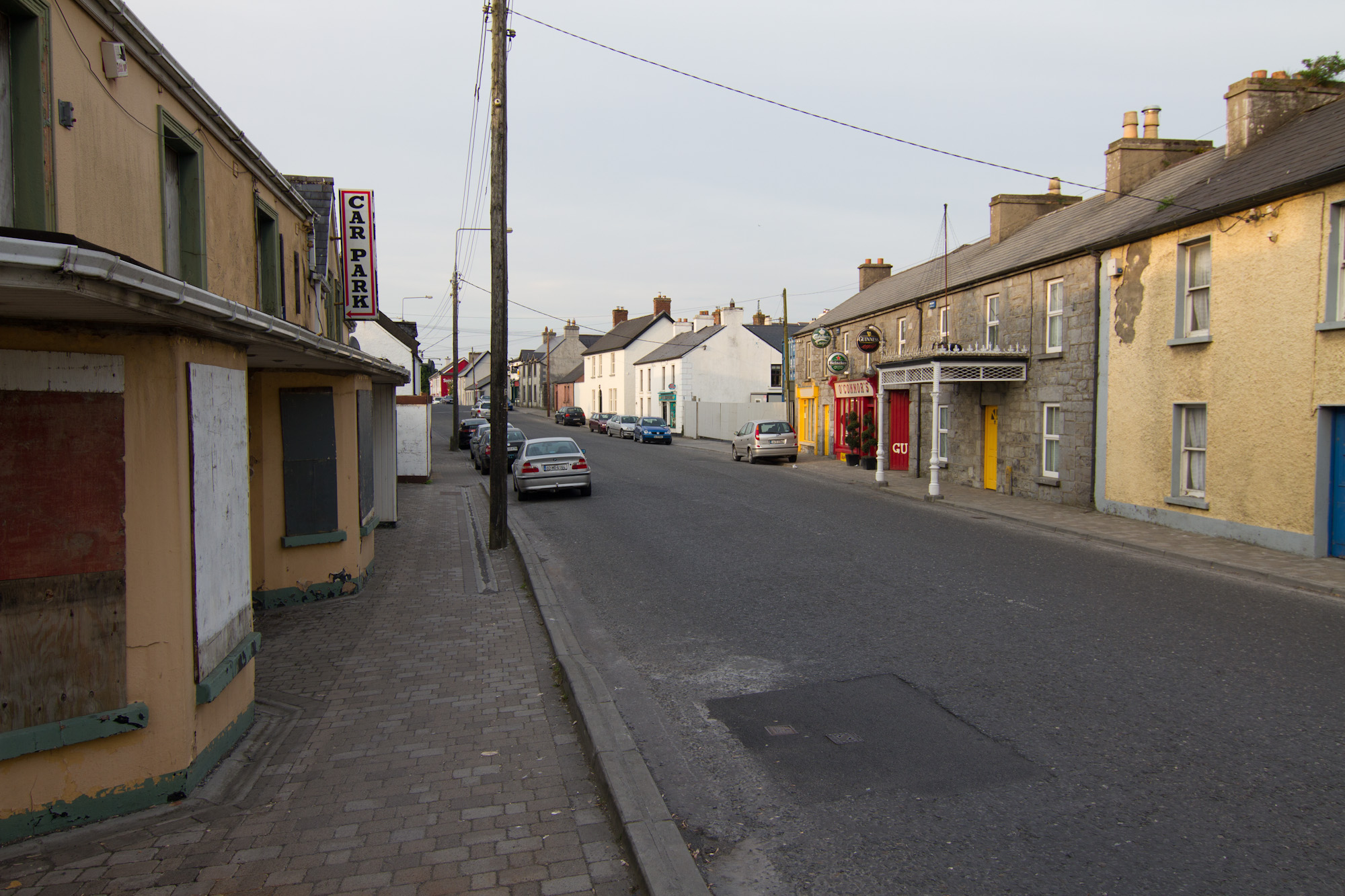
Street view of Ballysadare

== See also ==
- List of towns and villages in Ireland
