= 1981 Meath Senior Football Championship =

Meath S.F.C.
- Season: 1981
- Champions: Navan O'Mahonys; 10th Senior Championship Title
- Relegated: n/a
- Leinster SCFC: Navan O'Mahonys (Semi-final 3rd Replay) Raheens 2-13 Navan O'Mahonys 1-7,
- All Ireland SCFC: n/a
- Winning Captain: Ben Tansey (Navan O'Mahonys)
- Man of the Match: Finian Murtagh (Navan O'Mahonys)
- Matches: 40

The 1981 Meath Senior Football Championship is the 89th edition of the Meath GAA's premier club Gaelic football tournament for senior graded teams in County Meath, Ireland. The tournament consists of 13 teams, with the winner going on to represent Meath in the Leinster Senior Club Football Championship. The championship starts with a group stage and then progresses to a knock out stage.

Walterstown were the defending champions after they defeated Syddan in the previous years final. However, they lost their crown when losing to eventual champions Navan O'Mahonys at the semi-final stage.

This was Nobber's first ever period in the senior grade after claiming the 1980 Meath Intermediate Football Championship title.

On 18 October 1981, Navan O'Mahonys claimed their 10th Senior Championship title, when defeating Skryne 1-14 to 0-5 after a replay in Pairc Tailteann, Navan. This was the 6th time an S.F.C. final was decided after a replay. Ben Tansey raised the Keegan Cup for O'Mahonys while Finian Murtagh claimed the 'Man of the Match' award.

== Team changes ==
The following teams have changed division since the 1980 championship season.

=== To S.F.C. ===
Promoted from I.F.C.

- Nobber - (Intermediate Champions)

=== From S.F.C. ===
Regraded to I.F.C.

- Duleek

== Group stage ==
=== Group A ===
Team	Pld	W	L	D	PF	PA	PD	Pts
Walterstown	5	4	0	1	80	39	+41	9
Seneschalstown	5	3	0	2	59	29	+30	8
St. Patrick's	5	3	1	1	40	29	+11	7
Trim	5	2	3	0	47	53	-6	4
Dunshaughlin	5	1	4	0	23	69	-46	2
Gaeil Colmcille	5	0	5	0	26	56	-30	0

Round 1

- Walterstown 3-6, 1-8 St. Patrick's, Dunshaughlin, 12/4/1981,
- Trim 1-6, 0-6 Dunshaughlin, Kilberry, 12/4/1981,
- Seneschalstown 1-11, 0-7 Gaeil Colmcille, Kilmessan, 12/4/1981,

Round 2

- St. Patrick's 3-4, 0-3 Dunshaughlin, Duleek, 17/5/1981,
- Trim 2-13, 0-7 Gaeil Colmcille, Kilberry, 24/5/1981,
- Walterstown 0-10, 1-7 Seneschalstown, Stamullen, 21/6/1981,

Round 3

- Dunshaughlin 1-7, 0-6 Gaeil Colmcille, Martry, 14/6/1981,
- Seneschalstown 0-6, 0-6 St. Patrick's, Duleek, 5/7/1981,
- Walterstown 1-12, 1-6 Trim, Martry, 5/7/1981,

Round 4

- St. Patrick's 1-7, 0-5 Trim, Dunshaughlin, 19/7/1981,
- Seneschalstown 1-11, 0-1 Dunshaughlin, Kilmessan, 19/7/1981,
- Walterstown 1-10, 0-6 Gaeil Colmcille, Martry, 29/7/1981,

Round 5

- Walterstown 5-12, 0-3 Dunshaughlin, Skryne, 24/7/1981,
- Seneschalstown 2-9, 0-5 Trim, Dunshaughlin, 23/8/1981,
- St. Patrick's w/o, scr Gaeil Colmcille, Seneschalstown, 24/8/1981,

=== Group B ===
Team	Pld	W	L	D	PF	PA	PD	Pts
Skryne	6	5	0	1	77	34	+43	11
Navan O'Mahonys	6	4	1	1	77	50	+27	9
Summerhill	6	4	2	0	67*	55*	+27*	8
Syddan	6	2	2	2	29**	47**	-18**	6
Nobber	6	2	3	1	64	55	+9	5
Martinstown/Athboy	6	1	5	0	33*	86*	-53*	2
Castletown	6	0	5	1	37	57	-40	1

Round 1

- Skryne 6-7, 0-1 Syddan, Pairc Tailteann, 12/4/1981,
- Navan O'Mahonys 3-8, 0-12 Summerhill, Trim, 12/4/1981,
- Martinstown/Athboy 1-8, 0-7 Castletown, Kells, 12/4/1981,
- Nobber - Bye.

Round 2

- Syddan 1-8, 1-2 Nobber, Castletown, 26/4/1981,
- Summerhill 1-17, 0-5 Martinstown/Athboy, Kilmessan, 3/5/1981,
- Navan O'Mahonys 1-12, 0-5 Castletown, Martry, 17/5/1981,
- Skryne - Bye.

Round 3

- Skryne 2-4, 1-7 Nobber, Pairc Tailteann, 10/5/1981,
- Summerhill 1-11, 3-1 Castletown, Pairc Tailteann, 24/5/1981,
- Navan O'Mahonys 2-12, 1-3 Martinstown/Athboy, Trim, 24/5/1981,
- Syddan - Bye.

Round 4

- Summerhill 0-14, 2-5 Nobber, Pairc Tailteann, 21/6/1981,
- Navan O'Mahonys 1-6, 2-3 Syddan, Castletown, 28/6/1981,
- Skryne 0-18, 0-5 Martinstown/Athboy, Dunshaughlin, 3/7/1981,
- Castletown - Bye.

Round 5

- Navan O'Mahonys 0-7, 0-6 Nobber, Kilberry, 5/7/1981,
- Syddan 2-2, 0-8 Castletown, Kells, 5/7/1981,
- Skryne 1-9, 0-7 Summerhill, Pairc Tailteann, 19/7/1981,
- Martinstown/Athboy - Bye.

Round 6:

- Nobber 1-6, 0-7 Castletown, Kilberry, 19/7/1981,
- Syddan w, l Martinstown/Athboy, Martry, 19/7/1981,
- Skryne 1-9, 1-8 Navan O'Mahonys, Duleek, 26/7/1981,
- Summerhill - Bye.

Round 7:

- Nobber 3-14, 0-6 Martinstown/Athboy, Martry, 24/7/1981,
- Summerhill w, l Syddan,
- Skryne w/o, scr Castletown,
- Navan O'Mahonys - Bye.

== Knock-out Stages ==
The winners and runners up of each group qualify for the semi-finals.

Semi-finals
1	Walterstown	2-4
4	Navan O'Mahonys	0-13
3	Skryne	1-10 R
2	Seneschalstown	1-3 R

Final
Navan O'Mahonys	1-14 R
Skryne	0-5 R

Semi-finals:

- Navan O'Mahonys 0-13, 2-4 Walterstown, Pairc Tailteann, 30/8/1981,
- Skryne 0-10, 1-7 Seneschalstown, Pairc Tailteann, 30/8/1981,

Semi-final Replay:

- Skryne 1-10, 1-3 Seneschalstown, Pairc Tailteann, 13/9/1981,

Final:

- Navan O'Mahonys 0-7, 1-4 Skryne, Pairc Tailteann, 27/9/1981,

Final Replay:

- Navan O'Mahonys 1-14, 0-5 Skryne, Pairc Tailteann, 18/10/1981,

== Leinster Senior Club Football Championship ==
Quarter-final:

- Newtown Blues 1-4, 2-13 Navan O'Mahonys, Drogheda Park, 22/11/1981,

Semi-final:

- Raheens 0-10, 0-10 Navan O'Mahonys, Parnell Park, 27/2/1982,
- Raheens 0-15, 1-12 Navan O'Mahonys, Parnell Park, 13/3/1982, (AET)
- Raheens 0-11, 0-11 Navan O'Mahonys, Parnell Park, 20/3/1982, (AET)
- Raheens 2-13, 1-7 Navan O'Mahonys, St. Conleth's Park, 28/3/1982,
