= Ballinafad =

Village in County Sligo, Ireland

Ballinafad Béal an Átha Fada
- Village
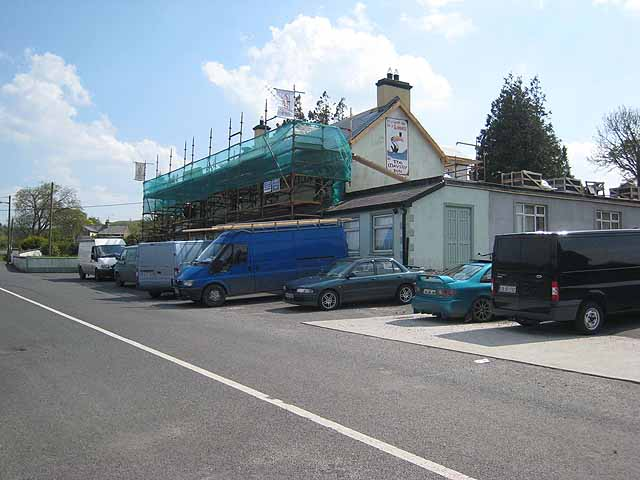
- The Mayfly, Ballinafad

- Location in Ireland
- Coordinates: 54°01′39″N 8°20′14″W
- Country: Ireland
- Province: Connacht
- County: County Sligo
- Barony: Tirerrill
- Elevation: 90 m (300 ft)
- Time zone: UTC+0 (WET)
  - Summer (DST): UTC-1 (IST (WEST))
- Irish Grid Reference: G779087

Ballinafad (Irish: Béal an Átha Fada, meaning 'mouth of the long ford') is a village in the south of County Sligo in the west of Ireland. The village overlooks Lough Arrow, and is itself overlooked by the ruins of Ballinafad Castle. The Most Rev. Dr John Healy, Lord Archbishop of Tuam from 1903 to 1918, was also born and raised in Ballinafad.

Ballinafad is in the south of the Barony of Tirerrill. There is also a village called Ballinafad in County Galway, and a large house called Ballinafad House in County Mayo which featured on The Great House Revival on RTÉ in 2018.

== See also ==
- List of towns in the Republic of Ireland
