= 1981 Meath Intermediate Football Championship =

Meath I.F.C.
- Season: 1981
- Champions: Ballivor; 3rd Intermediate Football Championship title
- Relegated: Ballinabrackey
- Matches: 68

The 1981 Meath Intermediate Football Championship is the 55th edition of the Meath GAA's premier club Gaelic football tournament for intermediate graded teams in County Meath, Ireland. The tournament consists of 21 teams. The championship starts with a group stage and then progresses to a knock out stage.

This was Duleek's first year in the Intermediate grade since 1978, after 2 years in the Senior grade since being regraded.

Meath Hill were promoted after claiming the 1980 Meath Junior Football Championship title. This was their first period as an Intermediate club since disbanding from their United Gaels amalgamation with Drumconrath in 1971. Ratoath were also given permission to affiliate a team in the Intermediate championship this season even though they failed to make the quarter-finals of the J.F.C. last season. This promotion was granted as they had a reserve side competing in the J.F.C. for 1981 and also 2 teams competing in the Division II F.C. (Junior B).

On 27 September 1981, Ballivor claimed their 3rd Intermediate championship title when they defeated Wolfe Tones 2–8 to 1–4 in the final.

Ballinabrackey were regraded to the J.F.C. for 1982 after failing to win a game and conceding their final two matches.

== Team changes ==
The following teams have changed division since the 1980 championship season.

=== From I.F.C. ===
Promoted to S.F.C.

- Nobber - (Intermediate Champions)

Relegated to J.A.F.C.

- Ballinlough
- Skryne 'B'

=== To I.F.C. ===
Regraded from S.F.C.

- Duleek

Promoted from J.A.F.C.

- Meath Hill - (Junior 'A' Champions)
- Ratoath

== Group stage ==
There are 3 groups called Group A, B and C. The top finishers in Group A and B will qualify for the semi-finals. First place in Group C along with the runners-up in all the groups qualify for the quarter-finals.

=== Group A ===
Team	Pld	W	L	D	PF	PA	PD	Pts
Wolfe Tones	6	6	0	0	53	21	+32	12
St. Mary's Donore	6	5	1	0	68*	35*	+33*	10
Navan O'Mahonys 'B'	6	4	2	0	69	51	+18	8
Kilbride	6	3	3	0	47	55	-8	6
Kilmainhamwood	6	2	4	0	49	61	-12	4
Dunderry	6	1	5	0	19*	46*	-27*	2
Rathkenny	6	0	6	0	28	68	-40	0

Round 1:

- St. Mary's 4-7, 0-7 Rathkenny, Seneschalstown, 5/4/1981,
- Kilbride 2-7, 1-3 Dunderry, Dunshaughlin, 5/4/1981,
- Wolfe Tones 0-8, 1-2 Kilmainhamwood, Castletown, 12/4/1981,
- Navan O'Mahonys 'B' - Bye,

Round 2:

- Wolfe Tones 1-4, 0-4 St. Mary's, Martry, 26/4/1981,
- Kilmainhamwood 3-2, 1-2 Rathkenny, Kells, 26/4/1981,
- Navan O'Mahonys 'B' 1-9, 0-6 Kilbride, Duleek, 26/4/1981,
- Dunderry - Bye,

Round 3:

- St. Mary's 3-6, 0-4 Kilmainhamwood, Pairc Tailteann, 3/5/1981,
- Wolfe Tones 3-7, 0-4 Rathkenny, Castletown, 3/5/1981,
- Navan O'Mahonys 'B' 4-11, 1-2 Dunderry, Kilmessan, 10/5/1981,
- Kilbride - Bye,

Round 4:

- Wolfe Tones 0-11, 0-2 Navan O'Mahonys 'B', Martry, 17/5/1981,
- St. Mary's w, l Dunderry, Seneschalstown, 17/5/1981,
- Kilbride 0-8, 0-7 Kilmainhamwood, Seneschalstown, 24/5/1981,
- Rathkenny - Bye,

Round 5:

- Kilbride 2-8, 0-8 Rathkenny, Duleek, 14/6/1981,
- Wolfe Tones w/o, scr Dunderry, Martry, 14/6/1981,
- Navan O'Mahonys 'B' 3-8, 2-6 Kilmainhamwood, Kilberry, 5/7/1981,
- St. Mary's - Bye,

Round 6:

- St. Mary's 3-8, 3-4 Kilbride, Seneschalstown, 21/6/1981,
- Kilmainhamwood 0-10, 1-5 Dunderry, Kilberry, 21/6/1981,
- Navan O'Mahonys 'B' 1-5, 0-4 Rathkenny, Martry, 19/7/1981,
- Wolfe Tones - Bye,

Round 7:

- Wolfe Tones 1-8, 0-6 Kilbride, Duleek, 5/7/1981,
- St. Mary's 1-10, 0-7 Navan O'Mahonys 'B', Seneschalstown, 2/8/1981,
- Dunderry w/o, scr Rathkenny,
- Kilmainhamwood - Bye.

=== Group B ===
Team	Pld	W	L	D	PF	PA	PD	Pts
Ballivor	6	6	0	0	90	42	+48	12
Martry Harps	6	5	1	0	94	47	+47	10
Duleek	6	3	3	0	72	89	-17	6
Ratoath	6	2	3	0	62	66	-4	5
Meath Hill	6	2	3	0	52	60	-8	5
Curraha	6	1	5	0	37	73	-36	2
Dunsany	6	1	5	0	36	66	-30	2

Round 1:

- Dunsany 0-7, 0-5 Ratoath, Skryne, 5/4/1981,
- Martry Harps 2-6, 0-3 Meath Hill, Kells, 12/4/1981,
- Ballivor 2-5, 1-5 Duleek, Skryne, 12/4/1981,
- Curraha - Bye,

Round 2:

- Martry Harps 5-10, 0-4 Duleek, Seneschalstown, 26/4/1981,
- Curraha 0-9, 1-1 Dunsany, Skryne, 26/4/1981,
- Ballivor 1-6, 0-8 Meath Hill, Kells, 17/5/1981,
- Ratoath - Bye,

Round 3:

- Ratoath 2-8, 1-2 Curraha, Dunshaughlin, 3/5/1981,
- Duleek 4-9, 4-7 Meath Hill, Kilberry, 29/5/1981,
- Ballivor 3-11, 0-7 Martry Harps, Trim, 19/6/1981,
- Dunsany - Bye,

Round 4:

- Meath Hill 1–10, 2-7 Ratoath, Seneschalstown, 14/6/1981,
- Duleek 2-10, 2-6 Dunsany, Seneschalstown, 19/6/1981,
- Ballivor 2-11, 0-4 Curraha, Pairc Tailteann, 28/6/1981,
- Martry Harps - Bye,

Round 5:

- Martry Harps 0-15, 1-2 Dunsany, Seneschalstown, 3/7/1981,
- Duleek 2-8, 0-11 Curraha, Seneschalstown, 5/7/1981,
- Ballivor 4-9, 1-9 Ratoath, Pairc Tailteann, 5/7/1981,
- Meath Hill - Bye,

Round 6:

- Meath Hill 1-6, 0-5 Dunsany, Pairc Tailteann, 12/7/1981,
- Martry Harps 2-18, 0-8 Curraha, Pairc Tailteann, 12/7/1981,
- Ratoath 0-11, 2-3 Duleek, Donaghmore, 24/7/1981,
- Ballivor - Bye,

Round 7:

- Ballivor 1-9, 0-3 Dunsany, Trim, 19/7/1981,
- Martry Harps 2-5, 0-7 Ratoath, Seneschalstown, 24/7/1981,
- Meath Hill w/o, scr Curraha,
- Duleek - Bye,

=== Group C ===
Team	Pld	W	L	D	PF	PA	PD	Pts
Walterstown 'B'	6	5	1	0	79	62	+17	10
Slane	6	4	1	1	69	43	+26	9
Donaghmore	6	4	2	0	34	39	-5	8
Moylagh	6	3	3	0	51	56	-5	6
Oldcastle	6	3	3	0	50	35	+15	6
Kilcloon	6	1	5	0	35	49	-14	2
Ballinabrackey	6	0	6	0	24	64	-40	0

Round 1:

- Walterstown 'B' 4-7, 2-5 Kilcloon, Dunshaughlin, 12/4/1981,
- Slane 0–8, 1-5 Oldcastle, Martry, 12/4/1981,
- Donaghmore 1-11, 1-8 Moylagh, Martry, 12/4/1981,
- Ballinabrackey - Bye,

Round 2:

- Walterstown 'B' 1-13, 3-2 Ballinabrackey, Kilmessan, 26/4/1981,
- Slane 2-5, 0-10 Moylagh, Kilberry, 26/4/1981,
- Oldcastle 2-4, 1-6 Donaghmore, Pairc Tailteann, 26/4/1981,
- Kilcloon - Bye,

Round 3:

- Moylagh 1-6, 2-1 Oldcastle, Kilskyre, 3/5/1981,
- Kilcloon 1-7, 0-3 Ballinabrackey, Summerhill, 3/5/1981,
- Slane 1-3, 0-2 Donaghmore, Duleek, 24/5/1981,
- Walterstown 'B' - Bye,

Round 4:

- Moylagh 1-10, 1-7 Kilcloon, Trim, 17/5/1981,
- Walterstown 'B' 1-5, 0-6 Oldcastle, Kells, 24/5/1981,
- Slane 2-16, 1-6 Ballinabrackey, Kilmessan, 21/6/1981,
- Donaghmore - Bye,

Round 5:

- Donaghmore 2-12, 0-12 Walterstown 'B', Stamullen, 21/6/1981,
- Slane 1-11, 0-4 Kilcloon, Skryne, 5/7/1981,
- Oldcastle 1-13, 0-1 Ballinabrackey, Kildalkey, 5/7/1981,
- Moylagh - Bye,

Round 6:

- Walterstown 'B' 2-8, 0-8 Moylagh, Martry, 5/7/1981,
- Donaghmore w/o, scr Ballinabrackey, Kilmessan, 5/7/1981,
- Oldcastle w/o, scr Kilcloon,
- Slane - Bye,

Round 7:

- Walterstown 'B' 1-7, 0-8 Slane, Seneschalstown, 12/7/1981,
- Moylagh w/o, scr Ballinabrackey,
- Donaghmore w/o, scr Kilcloon,
- Oldcastle - Bye,

== Knock-out Stages ==
=== Finals ===
The teams in the quarter-finals are the second placed teams from each group and the Group C winner. The teams in the semi-finals are Group A and B winners along with the quarter-final winners.

Quarter-Finals
Martry Harps	1-8
Slane	1-4
Walterstown 'B'	1-9
St. Mary's Donore	0-10

Semi-Finals
Wolfe Tones	3-8
Martry Harps	1-9
Ballivor	1-10
Walterstown 'B'	0-9

Final
Wolfe Tones	1-4
Ballivor	2-8

Quarter-final:

- Walterstown 'B' 1-9, 0-10 St. Mary's, Seneschalstown, 16/8/1981,
- Martry Harps 1-8, 1-4 Slane, Kilberry, 16/8/1981,

Semi-final:

- Wolfe Tones 3-8, 1-9 Martry Harps, Pairc Tailteann, 30/8/1981,
- Ballivor 1-10, 0-9 Walterstown 'B', Pairc Tailteann, 4/9/1981,

Final:

- Ballivor 2-8, 1-4 Wolfe Tones, Pairc Tailteann, 27/9/1981,
