= Ballinafad Castle =

Elizabethan castle in County Sligo, Ireland

Coordinates: 54.0260°N 8.3358°W

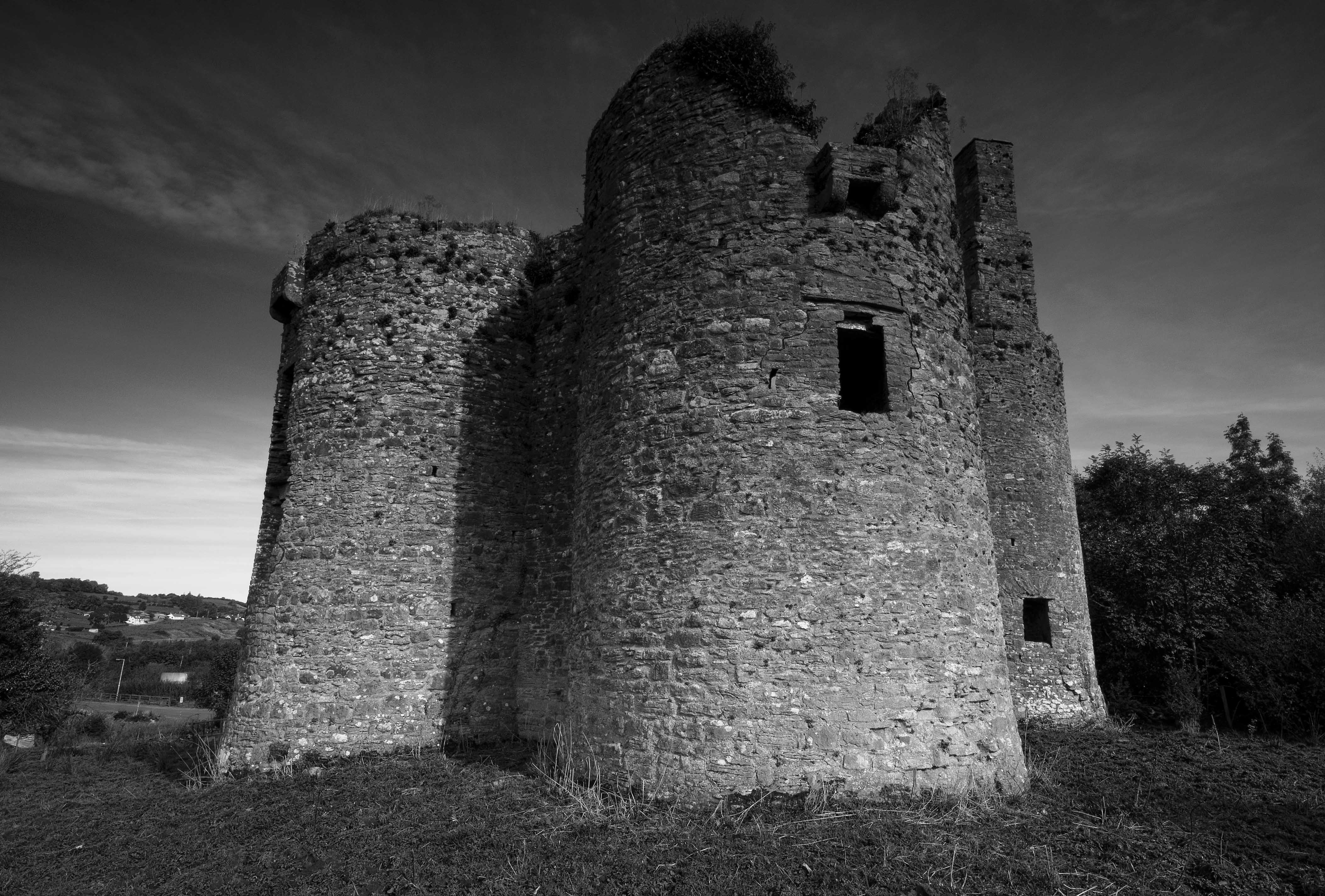
Ballinafad Castle

Ballinafad Castle, also known as the Castle of the Curlews, is located in the south of County Sligo, Ireland. It is at the village of Ballinafad, on the east side of the N4 road, overlooking Lough Arrow.

The castle is in ruins and is accessible year round. There are no tours, guides, or fees. Visitors can park in a small carpark at the foot of the hill where they will find an interpretive sign.

To enter the castle grounds, walk up the path and through the small iron gate. The castle is an Elizabethan blockhouse built during the Nine Years' War by Captain John St. Barbe on land granted to him by King James VI and I. The castle was garrisoned by ten men and commanded by John St. Barbe. It was partially destroyed by Red Hugh O’Donnel in 1595. The castle was again sacked in 1642 and fell out of use by 1680.

Visitors cannot enter the castle, but the interior is visible through breaches in the walls that are closed off by iron fences.
