= 1979 Meath Senior Football Championship =

Meath S.F.C.
- Season: 1979
- Champions: Navan O'Mahonys; 9th Senior Championship Title
- Relegated: Ballivor; Martry Harps; Moylagh
- Leinster SCFC: Navan O'Mahonys (preliminary round) Navan O'Mahonys 1-10, 1-11 Portlaoise
- All Ireland SCFC: n/a
- Winning Captain: Joe Cassells (Navan O'Nahonys)
- Man of the Match: Ben Tansey (Navan O'Mahonys)
- Matches: 40

The 1979 Meath Senior Football Championship is the 87th edition of the Meath GAA's premier club Gaelic football tournament for senior graded teams in County Meath, Ireland. The tournament consists of 16 teams, with the winner going on to represent Meath in the Leinster Senior Club Football Championship. The championship starts with a group stage and then progresses to a knockout stage.

Walterstown were the defending champions after they defeated Summerhill in the previous year's final. However, they lost their crown to Navan O'Mahonys in the final.

This was Duleek's return to the senior grade after claiming the 1978 Meath Intermediate Football Championship title.

On 20 October 1979, Navan O'Mahonys claimed their 9th Senior Championship title, when defeating Summerhill 1-9 to 1-3 in Pairc Tailteann, Navan. Joe Cassells raised the Keegan Cup for O'Mahonys while Ben Tansey claimed the "Man-of-the-Match" award. The final was also noted to be Meath legend Mattie Kerrigan's last S.F.C. match with Summerhill.

Ballivor, Martry Harps and Moylagh were regraded to the 1980 I.F.C. at the end of the campaign after 8, 2 and 4 years in the top flight respectively.

This was also Mattie Kerrigan's final season of football with Summerhill before he retired. His career is decorated with 1 Leinster S.C.F.C. title, 4 Meath S.F.C. titles, 2 Feis Cups and an I.F.C. medal. On the Inter County scene he has won 1 All-Ireland S.F.C. medal, 3 Leinster S.F.C. medals, 1 N.F.L. and 3 O'Byrne Cups.

== Team changes ==
The following teams have changed division since the 1978 championship season.

=== To S.F.C. ===
Promoted from I.F.C.

- Duleek - (Intermediate Champions)

=== From S.F.C. ===
Regraded to I.F.C.

- Dunderry
- Kilbride

== Group stage ==
=== Group A ===
Team	Pld	W	L	D	PF	PA	PD	Pts
Navan O'Mahonys	7	7	0	0	0	0	+0	14
Seneschalstown	7	5	1	1	0	0	+0	11
St. Patrick's	7	5	1	1	0	0	+0	11
Dunshaughlin	7	4	3	0	0	0	+0	8
Duleek	7	1	4	2	0	0	+0	4
Gaeil Colmcille	7	1	4	2	0	0	+0	4
Martry Harps	7	1	5	1	0	0	+0	3
Ballivor	7	0	6	1	0	0	+0	1

Round 1:

- St. Patrick's 0-9, 0-5 Dunshaughlin, Donaghmore, 1/4/1979,
- Navan O'Mahonys 4-11, 0-3 Seneschalstown, Kilbride, 1/4/1979,
- Gaeil Colmcille 1-4, 0-7 Ballivor, Kildalkey, 1/4/1979,
- Duleek 3-7, 1-12 Martry Harps, Seneschalstown, 1/4/1979,

Round 2:

- Seneschalstown 3-9, 0-7 Ballivor, Trim, 29/4/1979,
- Navan O'Mahonys 0-10, 0-4 Gaeil Colmcille, Castletown, 20/5/1979,
- St. Patrick's 1-8, 1-3 Martry Harps, Dunshaughlin, 20/5/1979,
- Dunshaughlin 1-8, 1-7 Duleek, Seneschalstown, 27/5/1979,

Round 3:

- Seneschalstown 0-9, 0-4 Gaeil Colmcille, Gibbstown, 27/5/1979,
- St. Patrick's 4-17, 1-5 Duleek, Pairc Tailteann, 3/6/1979,
- Dunshaughlin 3-6, 1-6 Martry Harps, Athboy, 24/6/1979,
- Navan O'Mahonys 4-10, 2-4 Ballivor, Athboy, 10/7/1979,

Round 4:

- Duleek 0-9, 0-9 Gaeil Colmcille, Kilberry, 24/6/1979,
- Seneschalstown 3-7, 1-7 Martry Harps, Pairc Tailteann, 15/7/1979,
- Navan O'Mahonys 5-7, 1-5 St. Patrick's, Duleek, 15/7/1979,
- Dunshaughlin 5-6, 3-8 Ballivor, Trim, 15/7/1979,

Round 5:

- Seneschalstown 0-17, 1-2 Dunshaughlin, Pairc Tailteann, 20/7/1979,
- Navan O'Mahonys 1-11, 0-6 Martry Harps, Kilberry, 22/7/1979,
- St. Patrick's 1-11, 0-6 Gaeil Colmcille, Pairc Tailteann, 22/7/1979,
- Duleek w/o, scr Ballivor, Dunshaughlin, 12/8/1979,

Round 6:

- St. Patrick's 2-16, 0-3 Ballivor, Pairc Tailteann, 29/7/1979,
- Gaeil Colmcille w, l Martry Harps, Kilberry, 29/7/1979,
- Seneschalstown 3-9, 2-7 Duleek, ???, 5/8/1979,
- Navan O'Mahonys w/o, scr Dunshaughlin, Athboy, 5/8/1979,

Round 7:

- Navan O'Mahonys w, l Duleek, Dunshaughlin, 5/8/1979,
- Seneschalstown 0-7, 0-7 St. Patrick's, Skryne, 12/8/1979,
- Dunshaughlin w, l Gaeil Colmcille,
- Martry Harps w/o, scr Ballivor,

Semi-final playoff:

- Seneschalstown 2-5, 0-8 St. Patrick's, Skryne, 2/9/1979,

=== Group B ===
Team	Pld	W	L	D	PF	PA	PD	Pts
Summerhill	6	5	1	0	0	0	+0	10
Walterstown	6	5	1	0	0	0	+0	10
Skryne	6	3	2	1	0	0	+0	7
Castletown	6	3	3	0	0	0	+0	6
Syddan	6	2	3	1	0	0	+0	5
Trim	6	2	4	0	0	0	+0	4
Moylagh	6	0	6	0	0	0	+0	0

Round 1

- Summerhill 2-8, 0-3 Moylagh, Trim, 1/4/1979,
- Castletown 2-4, 1-4 Walterstown, Kells, 1/4/1979,
- Skryne 1-11, 0-7 Trim, Pairc Tailteann, 1/4/1979,
- Syddan - Bye,

Round 2

- Syddan 0-6, 0-4 Moylagh, Athboy, 22/4/1979,
- Walterstown 3-4, 1-5 Skryne, Pairc Tailteann, 20/5/1979,
- Trim 0-6, 0-4 Castletown, Kilskyre, 20/5/1979,
- Summerhill - Bye,

Round 3

- Summerhill 1-14, 2-5 Syddan, Martry, 20/5/1979,
- Skryne 2-4, 1-4 Castletown, Pairc Tailteann, 27/5/1979,
- Walterstown 0-10, 0-1 Dunshaughlin, 24/6/1979,
- Moylagh - Bye,

Round 4

- Skryne 1-10, 2-7 Syddan, Martry, 15/7/1979,
- Trim 1-11, 0-10 Moylagh, Athboy, 15/7/1979,
- Walterstown 2-6, 0-11 Summerhill, Skryne, 15/7/1979,
- Castletown - Bye,

Round 5

- Syddan 0-11, 1-2 Trim, Pairc Tailteann, 3/8/1979,
- Summerhill 1-11, 0-5 Skryne, Trim, 20/7/1979,
- Castletown w, l Moylagh, Kells, 3/8/1979,
- Walterstown - Bye,

Round 6:

- Castletown 1-10, 1-8 Syddan, Pairc Tailteann, 5/8/1979,
- Walterstown 1-10, 0-1 Moylagh, Kells, 5/8/1979,
- Summerhill 2-16, 0-2 Trim, Ballivor, 26/8/1979,
- Skryne - Bye,

Round 7:

- Walterstown 4-10, 0-5 Syddan, Pairc Tailteann, 12/8/1979,
- Summerhill 2-5, 1-4 Castletown, Martry, 12/8/1979,
- Skryne w, l Moylagh,
- Trim - Bye,

== Knock-out Stages ==
The winners and runners up of each group qualify for the semi-finals.

Semi-finals
1	Navan O'Mahonys	1-6 R
4	Walterstown	1-5
3	Summerhill	2-9
2	Seneschalstown	0-5

Final
Navan O'Mahonys	1-9
Summerhill	1-3

Semi-finals:

- Navan O'Mahonys 1-7, 0-10 Walterstown, Pairc Tailteann, 9/9/1979,
- Summerhill 2-9, 0-5 Seneschalstown, Pairc Tailteann, 23/9/1979,
- Navan O'Mahonys 1-6, 1-5 Walterstown, Pairc Tailteann, 23/9/1979, (replay)*

Final:

- Navan O'Mahonys 1-9, 1-3 Summerhill, Pairc Tailteann, 20/10/1979,
- The semi-final replay between Navan O'Mahonys and Walterstown ended in controversy when a late Eamonn Barry free kick for Walterstown was signalled to have been scored by the referee. However, O'Mahonys players brought it to his attention that the umpire had waved the free kick wide. The referee then overturned his original decision and O'Mahonys were deemed to have won the match. Following this Walterstown then objected to the game being awarded to O'Mahonys at a County Board meeting on 1 October. However this failed and the 'Blacks' brought the matter to the Leinster Council on 10 October. The delaying of the S.F.C. final meant that the County Board nominated Walterstown to represent the county in Leinster as they were the 1978 Senior Champions however after fierce objections from Navan O'Mahonys and Summerhill (the senior finalists) this was withdrawn. Eventually, the Leinster Council dismissed Walterstown's appeal and the final was fixed for 20 October.

== Leinster Senior Club Football Championship ==
Preliminary round:

- Navan O'Mahonys 1-10, 1-11 Portlaoise, Pairc Tailteann, 4/11/1979,
