= Nagnata =

Unknown town on Ptolemy's map of Ireland

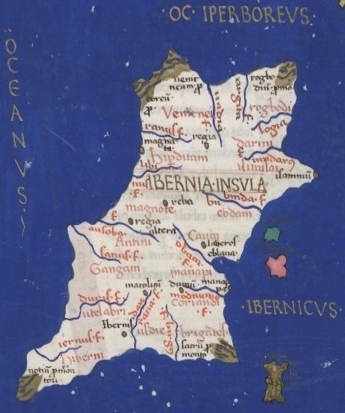
1467 reproduction of Ptolemy's Ireland: a grey dot in the upper left is labelled "Magnata."

Nagnata (Greek: Νάγνατα) or Magnata (Greek: Μάγνατα) is a town noted on the co-ordinate map of the 2nd century AD Alexandrian scholar Claudius Ptolemy in the territory of the Nagnatae (Ναγνᾶται). It is located in northwest Hibernia between the mouths of the rivers Ravius (Ῥαουίος), perhaps the Erne, and Libnius (Λιβνίος), perhaps the Moy. This is the only town noted on the Irish west, southern or northern coast. Surviving manuscripts of Ptolemy's Geography refers to the towns Hibernis (Teamhair'Erann/Tara), Rhaeba (Cruchain/Rathcroghan) and Magnata (Sligo) as "ἐπίσημος" (episēmos), an Ancient Greek word meaning "eminent" or "distinguished". Much of his work was based on the now lost geography of Marinus of Tyre.

As there were no proper urban centres in early Ireland and as Ptolemy's information was derived indirectly through traders, it is likely that the places which he calls "cities" were ancient places of assembly and hence trade. It is the only written evidence for knowledge or contact between the northwest of Ireland and the classical world in the European Iron Age.

That Phoenician and Greek ships had reached Ireland, possibly as early as the 6th century BC, is known from a now-lost merchants' handbook: the Massaliote Periplus, describing the sea routes used by traders from Phoenicia and Tartessus in their journeys from Hispania to Britain and the "Sacred Isle" of Ireland. Evidence for earlier contact may be an Irish lunate spearhead from the 10th century BC which was found in the harbour of Huelva in southern Spain.

== Historical opinions ==
The majority of early commentators placed Nagnata in modern County Sligo (Camden 1607, James Ware 1654, Samuel Lewis 1837, Martin 1910);

Other opinions include Ballina, County Mayo (William Orpen 1894); Westport, County Mayo (Stempel 2002); Achill Island (Ikins 1996, 2005); Galway (Hardiman 1820, Lewis 1837); on Erris Head Co. Mayo (Mac an Bhaird 1991,93).

== Modern research ==
Research by R. Darcy and William Flynn in 2008 at Oklahoma State University after correcting for various distortions in Ptolemy's co-ordinate system, identified Nagnata firmly in the vicinity of the modern Sligo town. The river Libnius they associate with the River Moy. The place of assembly known to international traders would therefore seem to be most likely a coastal location somewhere between Ballisodare and Drumcliff, both ancient gathering points within a five-mile radius of the modern Sligo town.
