= 1980 Meath Intermediate Football Championship =

Meath I.F.C.
- Season: 1980
- Champions: Nobber; 1st Intermediate Football Championship title
- Relegated: Ballinlough; Skryne 'B'

The 1980 Meath Intermediate Football Championship is the 54th edition of the Meath GAA's premier club Gaelic football tournament for intermediate graded teams in County Meath, Ireland. The tournament consists of 21 teams. The championship starts with a group stage and then progresses to a knock out stage.

This was Ballivor, Martry Harps, Moylagh's return the Intermediate grade since 8, 6 and 4 years in the Senior grade respectively.

St. Mary's Donore were promoted after claiming the 1979 Meath Junior Football Championship title.

Ballinlough and Skryne 'B' were regraded to the 1981 J.F.C. at the end of the campaign.

On 19 October 1980, Nobber claimed their 1st Intermediate championship title when they defeated Martry Harps 1–8 to 0–8 in the final.

== Team changes ==
The following teams have changed division since the 1979 championship season.

=== From I.F.C. ===
Promoted to S.F.C.

- Martinstown/Athboy - (Intermediate Champions)

Relegated to J.A.F.C.

- Drumbaragh
- St. Vincent's
- Summerhill 'B'

=== To I.F.C. ===
Regraded from S.F.C.

- Ballivor
- Martry Haprs
- Moylagh

Promoted from J.A.F.C.

- St. Mary's Donore - (Junior 'A' Champions)

== Group stage ==
There are 3 groups called Group A, B and C. The top finishers in Group A and B will qualify for the semi-finals. First place in Group C along with the runners-up in all the groups qualify for the quarter-finals.

=== Group A ===
Team	Pld	W	L	D	PF	PA	PD	Pts
Martry Harps	6	6	0	0	0	0	+0	12
Ballivor	6	3	2	1	0	0	+0	7
Curraha	6	3	2	1	0	0	+0	7
Moylagh	6	3	2	1	0	0	+0	7
Dunderry	6	2	3	1	0	0	+0	5
Kilcloon	6	2	4	0	0	0	+0	4
Kilbride	6	0	6	0	0	0	+0	0

Round 1:

- Curraha 1-7, 0-4 Moylagh, Kilberry, 13/4/1980,
- Martry Harps 0-10, 0-5 Ballivor, Trim, 13/4/1980,
- Dunderry 1-6, 1-3 Kilbride, Duleek, 13/4/1990,
- Kilcloon - Bye,

Round 2:

- Kilcloon 1-9, 0-8 Curraha, Skryne, 20/4/1980,
- Martry Harps 0-13, 1-5 Dunderry, Athboy, 27/4/1980,
- Ballivor 0-18, 1-5 Kilbride, Summerhill, 11/5/1980,
- Moylagh - Bye,

Round 3:

- Moylagh 0-11, 0-6 Kilcloon, Kilberry, 11/5/1980,
- Ballivor 2-12, 1-6 Dunderry, Athboy, 18/5/1980,
- Martry Harps 0-12, 1-5 Kilbride, Duleek, 18/5/1980,
- Curraha - Bye,

Round 4:

- Moylagh 2-9, 0-5 Dunderry, Kells, 25/5/1980,
- Martry Harps 0-12, 1-6 Kilcloon, Dunshaughlin, 25/5/1980,
- Curraha 0-15, 2-8 Ballivor, Dunshaughlin, 1/6/1980,
- Kilbride - Bye,

Round 5:

- Curraha w, l Kilbride, Skryne, 8/6/1980,
- Martry Harps 1-10, 1-5 Moylagh, Kells, 22/6/1980,
- Ballivor w, l Kilcloon, Summerhill, 13/7/1980,
- Dunderry - Bye,

Round 6:

- Dunderry 1–5, 1-5 Curraha, Duleek, 29/6/1980,
- Moylagh 2–10, 4-4 Ballivor, Athboy, 18/7/1980,
- Kilcloon w, l Kilbride,
- Martry Harps - Bye,

Round 7:

- Moylagh 2-14, 2-4 Kilbride, Pairc Tailteann, 3/8/1980,
- Martry Harps 1-10, 0-8 Curraha, Pairc Tailteann, 3/8/1980,
- Dunderry 1-10, 1-3 Kilcloon, Summerhill, 3/8/1980,
- Ballivor - Bye,

Quarter-final Playoff:

- Ballivor 2-11, 1-5 Moylagh, Trim, 17/8/1980,
- Ballivor 2-14, 0-1 Curraha, Kells, 7/9/1980,

=== Group B ===
Team	Pld	W	L	D	PF	PA	PD	Pts
Donaghmore	6	5	1	0	0	0	+0	10
Kilmainhamwood	6	4	2	0	0	0	+0	8
St. Mary's Donore	6	4	2	0	0	0	+0	8
Wolfe Tones	6	4	2	0	0	0	+0	8
Oldcastle	6	3	3	0	0	0	+0	6
Navan O'Mahonys 'B'	6	1	5	0	0	0	+0	2
Ballinabrackey	6	0	6	0	0	0	+0	0

Round 1:

- Kilmainhamwood 1-4, 0-6 St. Mary's, Castletown, 13/4/1980,
- Oldcastle 0-6, 0-5 Wolfe Tones, Kells, 13/4/1980,
- Donaghmore 2-5, 1-7 Ballinabrackey, Kilmessan, 13/4/1980,
- Navan O'Mahonys 'B' - Bye,

Round 2:

- Kilmainhamwood 1-9, 1-6 Navan O'Mahonys 'B', Trim, 27/4/1980,
- Oldcastle 0-12, 0-7 Ballinabrackey, Athboy, 27/4/1980,
- Wolfe Tones 3-9, 1-5 Donaghmore, Seneschalstown, 27/4/1980,
- St. Mary's - Bye,

Round 3:

- Wolfe Tones 1-9, 0-5 Ballinabrackey, Summerhill, 11/5/1980,
- Donaghmore 3-9, 2-10 Oldcastle, Kilberry, 11/5/1980,
- St. Mary's 3-7, 2-4 Navan O'Mahonys 'B', Seneschalstown, 11/5/1980,
- Kilmainhamwood - Bye,

Round 4:

- Donaghmore 3-9, 2-6 Navan O'Mahonys 'B', Skryne, 18/5/1980,
- Kilmainhamwood 3-13, 0-5 Ballinabrackey, Athboy, 18/5/1980,
- St. Mary's 2-5, 0-6 Wolfe Tones, Seneschalstown, 18/5/1980,
- Oldcastle - Bye,

Round 5:

- Donaghmore 0-9, 0-3 St. Mary's, Duleek, 1/6/1980,
- Kilmainhamwood 1-13, 2-4 Oldcastle, Kells, 15/6/1980,
- Navan O'Mahonys 'B' w/o, scr Ballinabrackey,
- Wolfe Tones - Bye,

Round 6:

- Oldcastle 0-5, 0-2 Navan O'Mahonys 'B', Athboy, 29/6/1980,
- Wolfe Tones 1-9, 2-2 Kilmainhamwood, Kells, 18/7/1980,
- St. Mary's w/o, scr Ballinabrackey,
- Donaghmore - Bye,

Round 7:

- St. Mary's 2-7, 2-5 Oldcastle, Martry, 18/7/1980,
- Donaghmore 1-9, 0-6 Kilmainhamwood, Pairc Tailteann, 10/8/1980,
- Wolfe Tones w, l Navan O'Mahonys 'B', Kells, 17/8/1980,
- Ballinabrackey - Bye,

Quarter-finals Playoff:

- Kilmainhamwood 3-6, 0-3 Wolfe Tones, Kells, 17/8/1980,
- Kilmainhamwood 1-12, 0-10 St. Mary's, Kilberry, 7/9/1980,

=== Group C ===
Team	Pld	W	L	D	PF	PA	PD	Pts
Nobber	6	6	0	0	0	0	+0	12
Slane	6	4	1	1	0	0	+0	9
Dunsany	6	4	1	1	0	0	+0	9
Rathkenny	6	3	3	0	0	0	+0	6
Ballinlough	6	2	4	0	0	0	+0	4
Walterstown 'B'	6	1	5	0	0	0	+0	2
Skryne 'B'	6	0	6	0	0	0	+0	0

Round 1:

- Nobber 2-8, 0-5 Rathkenny, Castletown, 13/4/1980,
- Slane 1-6, 0-5 Walterstown 'B', Skryne, 13/4/1980,
- Dunsany 3-8, 2-5 Ballinlough, Gibbstown, 13/4/1980,
- Skryne 'B' - Bye,

Round 2:

- Walterstown 'B' 1-7, 1-1 Skryne 'B', Seneschalstown, 20/4/1980,
- Rathkenny 1-7, 0-3 Ballinlough, Kells, 27/4/1980,
- Nobber 3-7, 1-6 Dunsany, Pairc Tailteann, 11/5/1980,
- Slane - Bye,

Round 3:

- Slane 0-8, 0-5 Skryne 'B', Duleek, 11/5/1980,
- Dunsany 1-6, 0-7 Rathkenny, Seneschalstown, 18/5/1980,
- Nobber 2-14, 0-4 Ballinlough, Martry, 18/5/1980,
- Walterstown 'B' - Bye,

Round 4:

- Slane 0-11, 0-6 Rathkenny, Castletown, 1/6/1980,
- Dunsany 1-9, 2-4 Walterstown 'B', Skryne, 1/6/1980,
- Ballinlough w, l Skryne 'B',
- Nobber - Bye,

Round 5:

- Slane 0-9, 0-3 Ballinlough, Gibbstown, 8/6/1980,
- Dunsany 1-7, 1-6 Skryne 'B', Kilmessan, 29/6/1980,
- Nobber w/o, scr Walterstown 'B', Kilberry, 18/7/1980,
- Rathkenny - Bye,

Round 6:

- Nobber w/o, scr Skryne 'B',
- Slane 0–9, 1-6 Dunsany, Pairc Tailteann, 21/7/1980,
- Rathkenny w/o, scr Walterstown 'B',
- Ballinlough - Bye,

Round 7:

- Nobber 0-9, 0-4 Slane, Castletown, 25/8/1980,
- Rathkenny w/o, scr Skryne 'B',
- Ballinlough w/o, scr Walterstown 'B',
- Dunsany - Bye,

Quarter-final Playoff:

- Slane w, l Dunsany, Kilberry, 31/8/1980,

== Knock-out Stages ==
=== Finals ===
The teams in the quarter-finals are the second placed teams from each group and the Group C winner. The teams in the semi-finals are Group A and B winners along with the quarter-final winners.

Quarter-Finals
Ballivor	1-8
Kilmainhamwood	1-9
Donaghmore	2-4
Slane	1-8

Semi-Finals
Nobber	2-7
Kilmainhamwood	1-7
Martry Harps	0-13
Slane	0-2

Final
Nobber	1-8
Martry Harps	0-8

Quarter-final:

- Slane 1-8, 2-4 Donaghmore, Seneschalstown, 14/9/1980,
- Kilmainhamwood 1-9, 1-8 Ballivor, Pairc Tailteann, 14/9/1980,

Semi-final:

- Nobber 2-7, 1-7 Kilmainhamwood, Pairc Tailteann, 28/9/1980,
- Martry Harps 0-13, 0-2 Slane, Pairc Tailteann, 28/9/1980,

Final:

- Nobber 1-8, 0-8 Martry Harps, Pairc Tailteann, 19/10/1980,
