= 1979 Meath Intermediate Football Championship =

Meath I.F.C.
- Season: 1979
- Champions: Martinstown/Athboy; 1st Intermediate Football Championship title
- Relegated: Drumbaragh Emmets; St. Vincent's; Summerhill 'B'

The 1979 Meath Intermediate Football Championship is the 53rd edition of the Meath GAA's premier club Gaelic football tournament for intermediate graded teams in County Meath, Ireland. The tournament consists of 21 teams. The championship starts with a group stage and then progresses to a knock out stage.

This was Dunderry and Kilbride's return the Intermediate grade after 8 and 16 years in the Senior grade respectively.

Walterstown 'B' were promoted after claiming the 1978 Meath Junior Football Championship title.

Drumbaragh Emmets, St. Vincent's and Summerhill 'B' were regraded to the 1980 J.F.C. at the end of the campaign.

On 28 October 1979, Martinstown/Athboy claimed their 1st Intermediate championship title when they defeated the Wolfe Tones 2–5 to 2–4 in the final in Pairc Tailteann. Martinstown/Athboy were just 4 years in existence since forming in 1976 from Intermediate club Martinstown (established in 1964) and Junior club Athboy.

== Team changes ==
The following teams have changed division since the 1979 championship season.

=== From I.F.C. ===
Promoted to S.F.C.

- Martinstown/Athboy - (Intermediate Champions)

Relegated to J.A.F.C.

- Drumbaragh
- St. Vincent's
- Summerhill 'B'

=== To I.F.C. ===
Regraded from S.F.C.

- Ballivor
- Martry Haprs
- Moylagh

Promoted from J.A.F.C.

- St. Mary's Donore - (Junior 'A' Champions)

== Group stage ==
There are 3 groups called Group A, B and C. The top finishers in Group A and B will qualify for the semi-finals. First place in Group C along with the runners-up in all the groups qualify for the quarter-finals.

=== Group A ===
Team	Pld	W	L	D	PF	PA	PD	Pts
Nobber	6	5	0	1	0	0	+0	11
Dunsany	6	4	0	2	0	0	+0	10
Ballinabrackey	6	3	3	0	0	0	+0	6
Walterstown 'B'	6	3	3	0	0	0	+0	6
Curraha	6	2	4	0	0	0	+0	4
Kilbride	6	1	4	1	0	0	+0	3
Ballinlough	6	1	5	0	0	0	+0	2

Round 1:

- Nobber 1-8, 1-2 Curraha, Seneschalstown, 1/4/1979,
- Dunsany 1–5, 1-5 Kilbride, Skryne, 1/4/1979,
- Ballinabrackey 0-7, 1-3 Ballinlough, Kildalkey, 1/4/1979,
- Walterstown 'B' - Bye,

Round 2:

- Dunsany 0-7, 0-6 Walterstown 'B', Skryne, 22/4/1979,
- Nobber 0-11, 0-4 Ballinlough, Kilbride, 29/4/1979,
- Curraha 2-4, 0-5 Ballinabrackey, Summerhill, 6/5/1979,
- Kilbride - Bye,

Round 3:

- Walterstown 'B' 0-9, 0-3 Kilbride, Dunshaughlin, 6/5/1979,
- Nobber 5-6, 0-4 Ballinabrackey, Trim, 20/5/1979,
- Ballinlough 1-9, 0-10 Curraha, Martry, 20/5/1979,
- Dunsany - Bye,

Round 4:

- Curraha 2-8, 1-10 Kilbride, Dunshaughlin, 27/5/1979,
- Ballinabrackey 3-4, 2-5 Walterstown 'B', Dunshaughlin, 27/5/1979,
- Dunsany w, l Ballinlough, Pairc Tailteann, 10/6/1979,
- Nobber - Bye,

Round 5:

- Walterstown 'B' w, l Ballinlough, Kells, 17/6/1979,
- Ballinabrackey 1-4, 0-6 Kilbride, Summerhill, 24/6/1979,
- Nobber 0–9, 2-3 Dunsany, Pairc Tailteann, 15/7/1979,
- Curraha - Bye,

Round 6:

- Dunsany 2-5, 1-7 Curraha, Skryne, 1/7/1979,
- Nobber w, l Walterstown 'B',
- Kilbride w, l Ballinlough,
- Ballinabrackey - Bye,

Round 7:

- Walterstown 'B' 4-11, 0-9 Curraha, Skryne, 15/7/1979,
- Nobber 2-14, 0-6 Kilbride, Duleek, 22/7/1979,
- Dunsany 0-7, 0-3 Ballinabrackey, Trim, 3/8/1979,
- Ballinlough - Bye,

=== Group B ===
Team	Pld	W	L	D	PF	PA	PD	Pts
Donaghmore	6	5	0	1	0	0	+0	11
Wolfe Tones	6	5	1	0	0	0	+0	10
Oldcastle	6	3	3	0	0	0	+0	6
Kilcloon	6	2	2	2	0	0	+0	6
St. Vincent's	6	2	4	0	0	0	+0	4
Slane	6	2	4	0	0	0	+0	4
Summerhill 'B'	6	0	5	1	0	0	+0	1

Round 1:

- Wolfe Tones 0-10, 0-1 Oldcastle, Drumbaragh, 1/4/1979,
- St. Vincent's 3-3, 0-4 Summerhill 'B', Trim, 1/4/1979,
- Donaghmore 1–7, 2-4 Kilcloon, Dunshaughlin, 1/4/1979,
- Slane - Bye,

Round 2:

- Wolfe Tones 3-5, 1-6 Slane, Pairc Tailteann, 22/4/1979,
- Kilcloon 1–4, 0-7 Summerhill 'B', Trim, 29/4/1979,
- Donaghmore 1-10, 2-4 St. Vincent's, Seneschalstown, 20/5/1979,
- Oldcastle - Bye,

Round 3:

- Slane 1-5, 0-5 Oldcastle, Martry, 6/5/1979,
- Kilcloon 1-7, 2-2 St. Vincent's, Pairc Tailteann, 27/5/1979,
- Donaghmore 4-11, 2-2 Summerhill 'B', Dunshaughlin, 27/5/1979,
- Wolfe Tones - Bye,

Round 4:

- Oldcastle 5-4, 2-7 St. Vincent's, Kilbride, 3/6/1979,
- Wolfe Tones 0-7, 0-5 Kilcloon, Dunshaughlin, 3/6/1979,
- Donaghmore 2-10, 2-3 Slane, Seneschalstown, 24/6/1979,
- Summerhill 'B' - Bye,

Round 5:

- Oldcastle 1-7, 1-3 Kilcloon, Trim, 24/6/1979,
- Wolfe Tones 1-6, 1-1 Summerhill 'B', Athboy, 24/6/1979,
- St. Vincent's w, l Slane, Duleek, 22/7/1979,
- Donaghmore - Bye,

Round 6:

- Slane 4-4, 3-4 Summerhill 'B', Skryne, 1/7/1979,
- Wolfe Tones 3-10, 0-5 St. Vincent's, Seneschalstown, 15/7/1979,
- Donaghmore 1-11, 0-6 Oldcastle, Kilbride, 15/7/1979,
- Kilcloon - Bye,

Round 7:

- Kilcloon 1-11, 3-4 Slane, Dunshaughlin, 15/7/1979,
- Donaghmore 2-9, 1-6 Wolfe Tones, Seneschalstown, 22/7/1979,
- Oldcastle w, l Summerhill 'B', Pairc Tailteann, 22/7/1979,
- St. Vincent's - Bye,

=== Group C ===
Team	Pld	W	L	D	PF	PA	PD	Pts
Kilmainhammwood	6	4	1	1	0	0	+0	9
Martinstown/Athboy	6	4	1	1	0	0	+0	9
Navan O'Mahonys 'B'	6	3	2	1	0	0	+0	7
Skryne 'B'	6	3	2	1	0	0	+0	7
Dunderry	6	2	3	1	0	0	+0	5
Rathkenny	6	1	4	1	0	0	+0	3
Drumbaragh Emmets	6	1	5	0	0	0	+0	2

Round 1:

- Kilmainahmwood 0-11, 0-2 Skryne 'B', Pairc Tailteann, 1/4/1979,
- Navan O'Mahonys 'B' 2-6, 1-5 Rathkenny, Kilbride, 1/4/1979,
- Dunderry 0-6, 0-3 Drumbaragh, Kilskyre, 1/4/1979,
- Martinstown/Athboy - Bye,

Round 2:

- Kilmainhamwood 0-4, 0-2 Drumbaragh, Martry, 8/4/1979,
- Skryne 'B' 1-3, 0-3 Dunderry, Kilberry, 22/4/1979,
- Martinstown/Athboy 2-12, 1-5 Rathkenny, Martry, 22/4/1979,
- Navan O'Mahonys - Bye,

Round 3:

- Kilmainhamwood 3-6, 0-6 Dunderry, Kells, 6/5/1979,
- Martinstown/Athboy 4-7, 1-9 Navan O'Mahonys, Castletown, 20/5/1979,
- Skryne 'B' 1-6, 1-2 Drumbaragh, Pairc Tailteann, 20/5/1979,
- Rathkenny - Bye,

Round 4:

- Kilmainhamwood 0–7, 1-4 Rathkenny, Kells, 20/5/1979,
- Navan O'Mahonys 'B' 2–6, 2-6 Dunderry, Martry, 17/6/1979,
- Martinstown/Athboy 5-8, 0-3 Drumbaragh, Kells, 29/7/1979,
- Skryne 'B' - Bye,

Round 5:

- Martinstown/Athboy 0–7, 1-4 Skryne 'B', Pairc Tailteann, 19/6/1979,
- Rathkenny 1-13, 2-1 Drumbaragh, Kells, 24/6/1979,
- Navan O'Mahonys 'B' 1-5, 1-2 Kilmainhamwood, Athboy, 5/8/1979,
- Dunderry - Bye,

Round 6:

- Dunderry 1-8, 0-7 Rathkenny, Martry, 1/7/1979,
- Navan O'Mahonys 'B' 0-11, 0-7 Skryne 'B', Duleek, 15/7/1979,
- Kilmainhamwood 4-6, 3-7 Martinstown/Athboy, Kells, 15/7/1979,
- Drumbaragh - Bye,

Round 7:

- Martinstown/Athboy 2-11, 2-2 Dunderry, Martry, 3/8/1979,
- Skryne 'B' w, l Rathkenny, Pairc Tailteann, 3/8/1979,
- Drumbaragh w, l Navan O'Mahonys,
- Kilmainhamwood - Bye,

== Knock-out Stages ==
=== Finals ===
The teams in the quarter-finals are the second placed teams from each group and the Group C winner. The teams in the semi-finals are Group A and B winners along with the quarter-final winners.

Quarter-Finals
Nobber	1-7
Martinstown/Athboy	1-10
Dunsany	1-5
Wolfe Tones	1-9

Semi-Finals
Martinstown/Athboy	1-9
Donaghmore	0-3
Kilmainahmwood	3-2
Wolfe Tones	1-9

Final
Martinstown/Athboy	2-5
Wolfe Tones	2-4

Quarter-final:

- Martinstown/Athboy 1-10, 1-7 Nobber, Kells, 26/8/1979,
- Wolfe Tones 1-9, 1-5 Dunsany, Pairc Tailteann, 26/8/1979,

Semi-final:

- Wolfe Tones 1-9, 3-2 Kilmainhamwood, Kells, 9/9/1979,
- Martinstown/Athboy 1-9, 0-3 Donaghmore, Pairc Tailteann, 7/10/1979,

Final:

- Martinstown/Athboy 2-5, 2-4 Wolfe Tones, Pairc Tailteann, 19/10/1979,
