= Ballysodare railway station =

Former railway station in County Sligo, Ireland

Ballysodare Baile Easa Dara

General information
- Coordinates: 54.2132°N 8.503°W
- Platforms: 2

History
- Opened: 3 December 1862
- Closed: 17 June 1963
Location

Ballysodare railway station, (Note: From references from when the station was open it always seems to have been titled Ballysodare in its lifeltime including timetables from 1920 reprinted in Shepherd (1994) which consistently refers to that name. The settlement was also more previously well known as Ballysodare. Currently an official name of Ballysadare for the settlement seems more generally adopted) currently with only the goods shed remaining, was located on the Dublin-Sligo railway line in Ballysadare, County Sligo. The station opened on 3 December 1862. It was closed to passengers on 17 June 1963 and finally closing to goods on 3 November 1975.

The station is believed to have been double tracked since opening, being singled in 1958.

Ballysodare station was on the Midland Great Western Railway which became part of Irish Rail. From 1882 until 1957 it also was served by the last independent railway in the British Isles, the Sligo, Leitrim and Northern Counties Railway from Enniskillen. The Burma Road or the Western Rail Corridor line to Claremorris Junction, Tuam and Galway was served from the station as well as Sligo station.

The station had its own small goods shed at the northern end of the west platform. Just beyond that a long siding diverged south westwards to the Flour Mills at Ballysadare; it was removed in the 1960s.
