= 1980 Meath Senior Football Championship =

Meath S.F.C.
- Season: 1980
- Champions: Walterstown; 2nd Senior Championship Title
- Relegated: Duleek
- Leinster SCFC: Walterstown (Final) Walterstown 2-9, 2-8 Éire Óg
- All Ireland SCFC: Walterstown (Final) St. Finbarr's 1-8, 0-6 Walterstown
- Winning Captain: Neil O'Sullivan (Walterstown)
- Man of the Match: Ollie O'Brien (Walterstown)
- Matches: 40

The 1980 Meath Senior Football Championship is the 88th edition of the Meath GAA's premier club Gaelic football tournament for senior graded teams in County Meath, Ireland. The tournament consists of 13 teams, with the winner going on to represent Meath in the Leinster Senior Club Football Championship. The championship starts with a group stage and then progresses to a knock out stage.

Navan O'Mahonys were the defending champions after they defeated Summerhill in the previous years final. However, they lost their crown when losing to eventual champions Waltertown at the semi-final stage.

This was Martinstown/Athboy's first ever period in the senior grade after claiming the 1979 Meath Intermediate Football Championship title.

On 19 October 1981, Walterstown claimed their 2nd Senior Championship title, when defeating Syddan 4-9 to 0-6 in Pairc Tailteann, Navan. Neil O'Sullivan raised the Keegan Cup for "The Blacks" while Ollie O'Brien claimed the 'Man of the Match' award. The match was watched by an attendance of 7,000.

Duleek were regraded to the 1980 I.F.C. at the end of the campaign.

== Team changes ==
The following teams have changed division since the 1980 championship season.

=== To S.F.C. ===
Promoted from I.F.C.

- Martinstown/Athboy - (Intermediate Champions)

=== From S.F.C. ===
Regraded to I.F.C.

- Ballivor
- Martry Harps
- Moylagh

== Group stage ==
=== Group A ===
Team	Pld	W	L	D	PF	PA	PD	Pts
Navan O'Mahonys	6	4	1	1	0	0	+0	9
Skryne	6	4	1	1	0	0	+0	9
Seneschalstown	6	4	1	1	0	0	+0	9
Summerhill	6	3	2	1	0	0	+0	7
Dunshaughlin	6	2	4	0	0	0	+0	4
Gaeil Colmcille	6	1	5	0	0	0	+0	2
St. Patrick's	6	0	4	2	0	0	+0	2

Round 1

- Seneschalstown 1-11, 1-10 Navan O'Mahonys, Martry, 13/4/1980,
- Dunshaughlin 1-7, 0-8 St. Patrick's, Seneschalstown, 13/4/1980,
- Skryne 1-11, 1-5 Gaeil Colmcille, Pairc Tailteann, 13/4/1980,
- Summerhill - Bye,

Round 2

- Navan O'Mahonys 2-7, 1-8 Summerhill, Trim, 27/4/1980,
- Skryne 1-8, 1-7 St. Patrick's, Duleek, 27/4/1980,
- Dunshaughlin 1-5, 1-4 Gaeil Colmcille, Pairc Tailteann, 11/5/1980,
- Seneschalstown - Bye,

Round 3

- Seneschalstown 3-3, 0-10 Summerhill, Dunshaughlin, 11/5/1980,
- Gaeil Colmcille 1-7, 1-5 St. Patrick's, Dunshaughlin, 18/5/1980,
- Skryne 3-8, 0-3 Dunshaughlin, Pairc Tailteann, 18/5/1980,
- Navan O'Mahonys - Bye,

Round 4

- Seneschalstown 1-10, 1-6 Dunshaughlin, Pairc Tailteann, 1/6/1980,
- Skryne 0-10, 1-7 Navan O'Mahonys, Seneschalstown, 1/6/1980,
- Summerhill 0-10, 0-5 Gaeil Colmcille, Athboy, 13/7/1980,
- St. Patrick's - Bye,

Round 5

- Navan O'Mahonys 4-9, 1-7 St. Patrick's, Kilmessan, 22/6/1980,
- Summerhill w, l Dunshaughlin,
- Seneschalstown w/o, scr Gaeil Colmcille, Pairc Tailteann, 18/7/1980,
- Skryne - Bye,

Round 6:

- Navan O'Mahonys 1-13, 3-2 Dunshaughlin, Kilmessan, 18/7/1980,
- Summerhill 3-3, 1-7 Skryne, Dunshaughlin, 1/8/1980,
- Seneschalstown 1-10, 2-7 St. Patrick's, Duleek, 26/8/1980,
- Gaeil Colmcille - Bye,

Round 7:

- Skryne 1-10, 1-4 Seneschalstown, Pairc Tailteann, 10/8/1980,
- Summerhill 2-4, 2-4 St. Patrick's, Seneschalstown, 10/8/1980,
- Navan O'Mahonys w/o, scr Gaeil Colmcille,
- Dunshaughlin - Bye,

Play-Offs:

- Navan O'Mahonys 2-9, 1-11 Skryne, Pairc Tailteann, 31/8/1980,
- Skryne 1-8, 1-6 Seneschalstown, Pairc Tailteann, 7/9/1980.

=== Group B ===
Team	Pld	W	L	D	PF	PA	PD	Pts
Walterstown	5	4	1	0	0	0	+0	8
Syddan	5	4	1	0	0	0	+0	8
Trim	5	3	2	0	0	0	+0	6
Duleek	5	2	3	0	0	0	+0	4
Castletown	5	2	3	0	0	0	+0	4
Martinstown/Athboy	5	0	5	0	0	0	+0	0

Round 1

- Trim 0-9, 0-5 Martinstown/Athboy, Kilskyre, 13/4/1980,
- Walterstown 4-12, 3-2 Duleek, Skryne, 13/4/1980,
- Syddan 1-7, 1-2 Castletown, Kilberry, 13/4/1980,

Round 2

- Syddan 0-18, 1-3 Duleek, Kilberry, 27/4/1980,
- Walterstown 3-10, 0-5 Martinstown/Athboy, Kells, 18/5/1980,
- Castletown 1-11, 0-5 Trim, Kells, 18/5/1980,

Round 3

- Walterstown 4-9, 1-6 Syddan, Castletown, 25/5/1980,
- Trim 2-14, 1-6 Duleek, Dunshaughlin, 1/6/1980,
- Castletown 3-11, 0-6 Martinstown/Athboy, Martry, 13/7/1980,

Round 4

- Trim 1-7, 0-9 Walterstown, Pairc Tailteann, 9/7/1980,
- Duleek w/o, scr Castletown, Seneschalstown, 18/7/1980,
- Syddan 3-13, 0-6 Martinstown/Athboy, Kells, 20/7/1980,

Round 5

- Syddan 1-9, 0-11 Trim, Pairc Tailteann, 31/8/1980,
- Walterstown 1-11, 1-9 Castletown, Pairc Tailteann, 31/8/1980,
- Duleek w/o, scr Martinstown/Athboy,

== Knock-out Stages ==
The winners and runners up of each group qualify for the semi-finals.

Semi-finals
1	Skryne	0-7
4	Syddan	1-7
3	Walterstown	3-12
2	Navan O'Mahonys	2-9

Final
Syddan	0-6
Walterstown	4-9

Semi-finals:

- Syddan 1-7, 0-7 Skryne, Pairc Tailteann, 14/9/1980,
- Walterstown 3-12, 2-9 Navan O'Mahonys, Pairc Tailteann, 14/9/1980,

Final:

- Walterstown 4-9, 0-6 Syddan, Pairc Tailteann, 19/10/1980,

== Leinster Senior Club Football Championship ==
Quarter-final:

- Civil Service 0-8, 0-8 Walterstown, O'Toole Park, 9/11/1980,
- Walterstown 3-9, 0-6 Civil Service, Pairc Tailteann, 23/11/1980,

Semi-final:

- Walterstown 2-9, 2-9 Baltinglass, St. Conleth's Park, 7/12/1980,
- Walterstown 4-8, 1-4 Baltinglass, St. Conleth's Park, 21/12,1980,

Final:

- Walterstown 2-9, 2-8 Éire Óg, St. Conleth's Park, 22/2/1981,

== All-Ireland Senior Club Football Championship ==
Semi-final:

- Walterstown 2-12, 1-5 St. Mary's,

Final:

- St. Finbarr's 1-8, 0-6 Walterstown,
