= Ballinafad House =

Mansion in County Mayo, Ireland

Ballinafad House Béal an Átha Fada
- Manor
- Location in Ireland
- Coordinates: 53°46′55″N 9°11′01″W
- Country: Ireland
- Province: Connacht
- County: County Mayo
- Elevation: 40 m (130 ft)
- Time zone: UTC+0 (WET)
  - Summer (DST): UTC+1 (IST (WEST))
- Irish Grid Reference: M198842

Ballinafad House (Irish: Béal an Átha Fada, meaning 'mouth of the long ford') is a Georgian mansion near Belcarra, County Mayo, Ireland. The 70,000 square foot house of 110 rooms was built in 1827 by Maurice Blake, High Sheriff of Mayo. It holds a legally protected conservation status for its historical importance.

Following the Blakes, the buildings were used as a Catholic seminary, boarding school, agricultural college, refugee accommodation and latterly as a hotel. The property includes 40 bedrooms, sports courts and renovated, 19th century chapel. It was featured on the BBC's Great House Revival in 2018.

== Background ==
The house was built in 1827 by Maurice Blake, High Sheriff of Mayo, who descended from an influential Catholic family of long standing. The Blake family are regarded as one of the 14 Tribes of Galway, merchant families that dominated the region from the 13th to the late 19th century. It was the manor house of the local area, on its 1000-acre estate. In 1908, his son Llewellyn Joseph Blake (1840 – 1916), gave the mansion to the Catholic Society of African Missions (SMA) and was made a papal count, by the church, in return. A new wing was added in 1932. At this time it was known as Sacred Heart College and used as a boarding school and seminary. Staff accommodation, student dormitories and dining halls were constructed in 1948. Over 500 priests were trained there in order to pursue missionary work, until 1957. It later served as an agricultural college until 1975. For many years the empty building was the subject of plans to create a detention centre, sports complex or luxury hotel but these ideas were not developed. Left abandoned for 20 years, without power or water, much of the roofs fell in and there was extensive water ingress.

In 2014, in a derelict state, and listed as a legally protected structure for historic conservation, the house won Built Heritage funding from the Irish government. It was renovated by Australian architect and developer Bede Tannock who bought the building for €80,000. The works included installing a banquet hall and facilities for large scale weddings, with a view to restore the building as faithful to the original Georgian mansion as possible. During works on the house, the world's most northern colony of lesser horseshoe bats was discovered, a finding of ecological significance. A bat expert created an airlock system that allowed the bats to enter and leave the building. The house has the country's widest residential chimney, serving 26 fireplaces across the mansion. The property was sold in 2019, and later used to house Ukrainian refugees fleeing the Russian war. It now operates as a hotel.

== Legacy ==
The letters of Maurice Blake are held in the archives of National Library of Ireland. The house and its renovation was featured on the BBC's Great House Revival in 2018.
