= Tir Ollíol =

Polity in northwest Ireland (ended 1603)

- Túath/ Tríocha Céad
- History
  - Created: uncertain
  - Abolished: 1603
  - Succeeded by: Barony of Tirerill
- Status: Túath (Territory)
- Contained within
  - Confederation: Iochtar Connacht
- Subdivisions
  - Type: Parishes/Townlands

Tir Ollíol was a túath in northwest Ireland. It was part of the confederation of Iochtar Connacht until the late 16th century. Its name is preserved by the barony of Tirerril in southeast County Sligo. It is named after Olliol, one of the sons of Eochaid Mugmedon and half brother of Niall of the Nine Hostages, from whom descended the Uí Ailello, a branch of the early Irish dynasty known as the Connachta.

== History ==
The Uí Aillelo dynasty sank into obscurity at an early date. but the name is preserved as the tuath of Tir Ollíol (Tirerril).

The Lords of Tir Olioll were Mac Donnchadha of the Uí Briúin Aí a branch of the Mac Díarmada of Moylurg (Magh Luirg). The Mac Donagh (Mac Donnchadha) surname originates from Donnchadh, son of Tomaltach na cairge (of the rock) ua Mac Diarmata, who was King of Moylurg 1197-1207. They later split into two groups, one based in Collooney and Ballindoon (Tirerril), and the other in Ballymote (Corran).

== Saint Patrick ==
Saint Patrick departed across the mountain of the sons of Ailellus, and he founded churches there, Taemnach, and Ethenach, and Cell Angle, and Cell Senchuoe. AD 545.2 St. Ailbhe, of Seanchu Ua nOiliolla, died.
