= Ben Tansey =

Irish sportsman

Personal information
- Born: 22 June 1953 Ballinasloe, County Galway, Ireland
- Died: 25 March 2011 (aged 57)
- Occupation: Garda Síochána

Sport
Clubs
- Years: Club
- 1970–1978 1971–1978 1979–1996: Four Roads (H); St Aidan's, Ballyforan; Navan O'Mahonys
Club titles
| | Football | Hurling |
| Meath titles | 7 | 2 |
| Connacht titles | 0 | 1 |
Inter-county
- Years: County
- 1976–1978 1971–1978 1980–1985 1980–1989: Roscommon (F); Roscommon (H); Meath (F); Meath (H)
Inter-county titles
| | Football | Hurling |
| Connacht Titles | 1 | 0 |
| All-Ireland Titles | 0 | 1 (Junior) |

Ben Tansey was the son of Bernard Tansey and Kathleen Glynn of Caltraghduff, Ballyforan, County Roscommon. Tansey played senior inter-county football and hurling for two different counties, Roscommon and Meath.

Tansey started playing hurling and football with his local clubs, Four Roads and St Aidan's in Roscommon. He won underage hurling championships with Four Roads and also a U16 "B" All-Ireland hurling medal with Roscommon. He played Minor and Under 21 football and hurling for Roscommon. Tansey went to Ballinafad College, in Mayo, where he played in four Connacht colleges hurling finals, won a Connacht colleges football medal and a Mayo colleges football championship. Tansey joined the Garda Síochána in 1973 and was stationed in Rush, Balbriggan, and Navan. He served in Navan for 27 years until his retirement in 2003.

During his playing days in Roscommon Tansey won a Connacht Senior Football Championship in 1978 and an All-Ireland Junior Hurling Championship in 1974. Tansey is one the Roscommon hurlers to have played Railway Cup with Connacht. He won two Roscommon Senior Hurling Championship titles with Four Roads, and also a Connacht Senior Club Hurling Championship medal in 1977. He won an Intermediate Football Championship with St Aidan's, and was also club footballer of the year in 1975.

Tansey transferred to Navan O'Mahonys in 1979. With them he won seven Meath Senior Football Championship titles and two Meath Senior Hurling Championship titles, being a member of the double-winning team in 1985. He also won two Intermediate Hurling Championship (IHC) titles and several Feis Cup and League football medals. He was also club footballer of the year and club hurler of the year. Tansey also holds the distinction of having won "Man of the Match" awards in both senior football (1979) and senior hurling (1986) finals. He was the Keegan Cup-winning captain in 1981. Tansey last lined out for O'Mahony's in the 1996 IHC final, aged 43, rounding off a 26-year club career with 15 club championship medals.

Tansey is best remembered in Meath for being an inter-county dual player. In particular for goals he scored at Croke Park in the Leinster Senior Football Championship (SFC) against Dublin in 1983 and 1984. The goal he scored in the 1984 Leinster SFC final in 1984 would be the only one conceded by John O'Leary in the championship that year. Tansey was Meath senior footballer of the year in 1982 and won an O'Byrne Cup medal in 1983. Tansey was on Meath hurling and football teams that were managed by Seán Boylan.

Tansey was highly regarded in Navan as a hurling coach and coached teams at all grades. He was player–coach for the two senior hurling championships he won and was involved in several O'Mahony's juvenile team that travelled to Feile na nGael competitions.

Tansey was interested in many other sports, such as handball, squash, fishing and pitch and putt. He played competitive basketball for Navan O'Mahony's, competitive soccer with Navan Gardaí in the early days of the Meath and District League and also lined out at full back for Navan R.F.C. on several occasions. After his G.A.A. days he became a member of the Royal Tara Golf Club and represented the club in competitions. He played off a handicap of five and once held the course record.

As well as having the distinction of being a dual player with two different counties Ben also had two uncles with unique records. John Glynn played Connacht senior football championship with 3 different counties, his native Galway, Sligo and Leitrim. His brother Tim Glynn played Munster senior hurling championship with 2 different counties, his native Galway and Limerick, he also played Junior hurling with Kerry & Junior football with Limerick. Other brothers, Martin, Tom & Frank Glynn also played hurling with Galway. Tansey also had 2 aunts who played in an All-Ireland Camogie final for Galway against Antrim in 1946. His cousin Sheila Coen played with the Galway camogie team in the 90's.
