= Tirerril =

Tirerril Tír Oirill (Irish)
- Barony
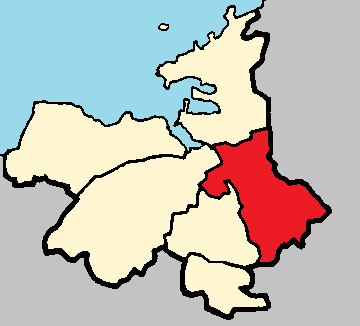
- Country: Ireland
- Province: Connacht
- County: Sligo

Area
  - Land: 306.8 km^{2} (118.5 sq mi)

Tirerill (Tír Oirill) is a barony in east County Sligo. It corresponds to the ancient túath of Tir Ollíol.
