= Lisnaran Fort =

- Lios na Rann (Irish)
- Location within Ireland
- 53.882652°N 6.347109°W
- Type: ringfort
- Periods: Viking Ireland
- Cultures: Norse Gaels/Gaelic Irish
- Location: Linns, Annagassan, County Louth, Ireland
- Region: Dundalk Harbour
- Part of: Linn Duachaill?

History
- Built: 9th–10th century
- Built by: Norse Gaels?
- Abandoned: 14th century?

Site notes
- Material: earth
- Elevation: 17 m (56 ft)
- Area: 0.2 ha (0.49 acres)
- Circumference: 335 m (1,099 ft)
- Archaeologists: Paul Stevens
- Public access: yes

National monument of Ireland
- Official name: Lisnaran Fort
- Reference no.: 579

Lisnaran Fort is a ringfort (rath) and National Monument located in County Louth, Ireland.

== Location ==
Lisnaran Fort is located outside Annagassan, near the meeting-point of the River Glyde and River Dee.

== History ==
Edward II pennies

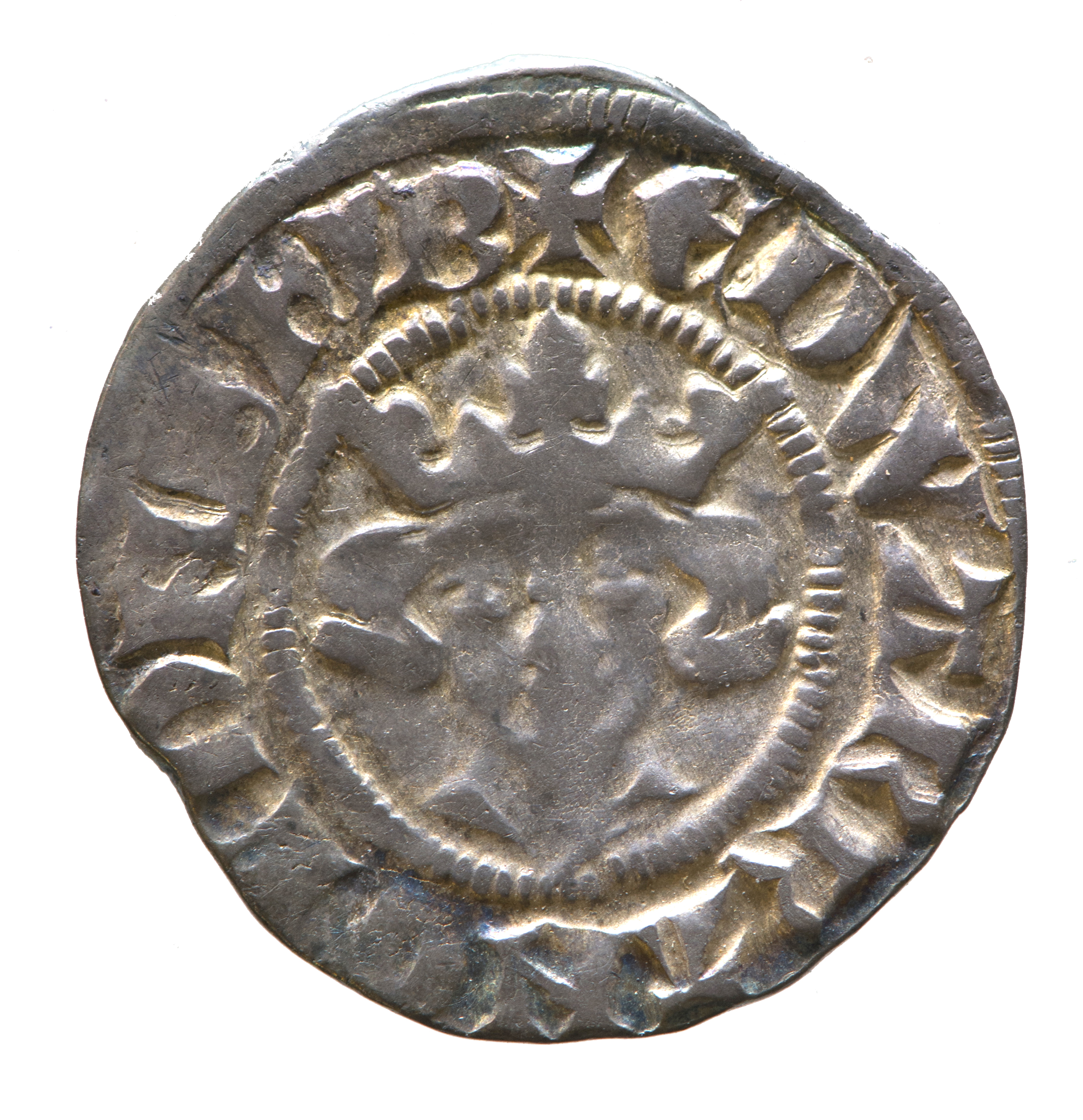
Obverse

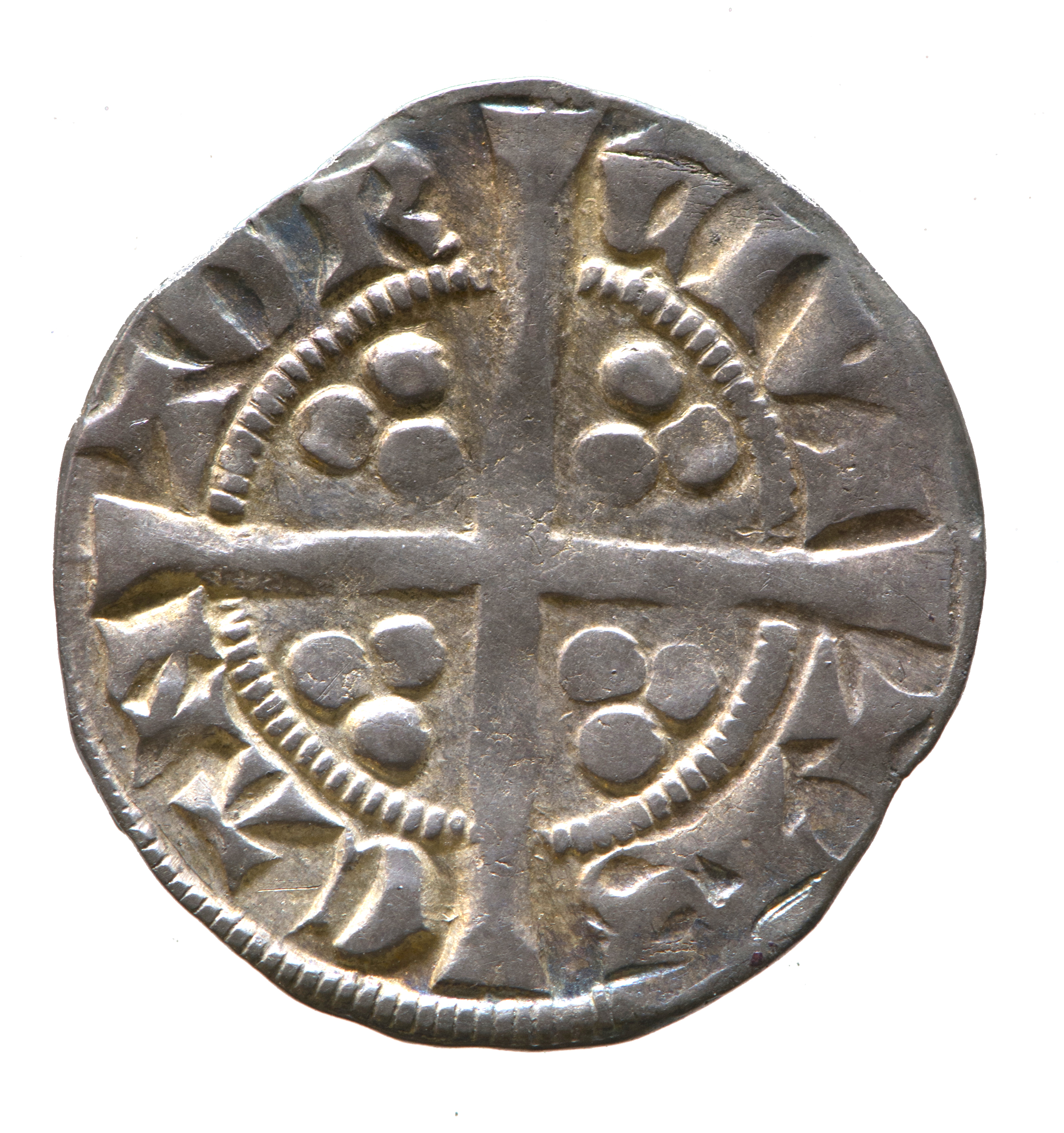
Reverse

Pennies of Edward II, like those found at Lisnaran.

Lisnaran contains the remains of circular and a rectangular structures, and may have featured more extensive defences outside the main enclosure. It was historically associated with the Viking longphort Linn Duachaill, but the combination of a hillfort with round and rectangular structures suggests a Gaelic Irish origin. The only find at Lisnaran was a wooden box in 1928, containing twelve silver pennies, all dating from 1279–1315 and from the reign of Edward I or Edward II as Lord of Ireland.
