= Roodstown Castle =

- Caisleán Bhaile an Rútaigh (Irish)
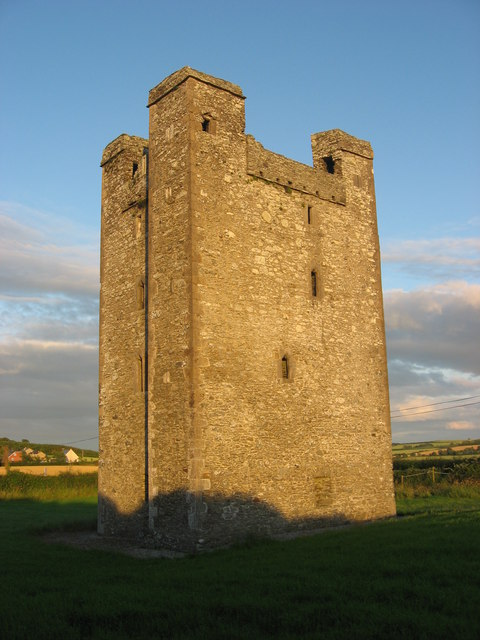

- Location within Ireland
- 53.872243°N 6.486708°W
- Type: tower house
- Location: Roodstown, Ardee, County Louth, Ireland

History
- Built: 15th century

Site notes
- Height: 15 m (49 ft)
- Area: Dee Valley
- Owner: State

National monument of Ireland
- Official name: Roodstown Castle
- Reference no.: 298

Roodstown Castle is a 15th-century tower house and National Monument located in County Louth, Ireland.

== Location ==
Roodstown Castle is located by the roadside, 3.6 km (2.2 mi) north-northeast of Ardee.

== History ==
Roodstown Castle was built in the 15th century, standing at a strategic point between the River Glyde, River Dee, Ardee and the Irish Sea. It is similar to, although taller than, the ten-pound castles built under Henry VI. It is locally associated with the Taaffe family.

== Building ==
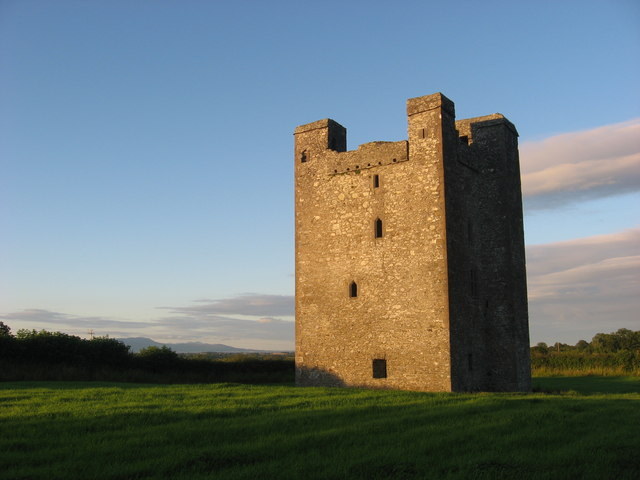
Another view

Roodstown Castle is a rectangular tower house of four storeys with small turrets at diagonally opposed corner: a spiral stairway in the SE and garderobes in the NW.

The castle contained a vaulted ground-floor cellar or storage space, a murder-hole, a crenellated parapet, chemin de ronde.

The upper floors have large ogee windows and fireplaces.
