= Greenmount Motte =

- Móta Dhruim Chatha (Irish)
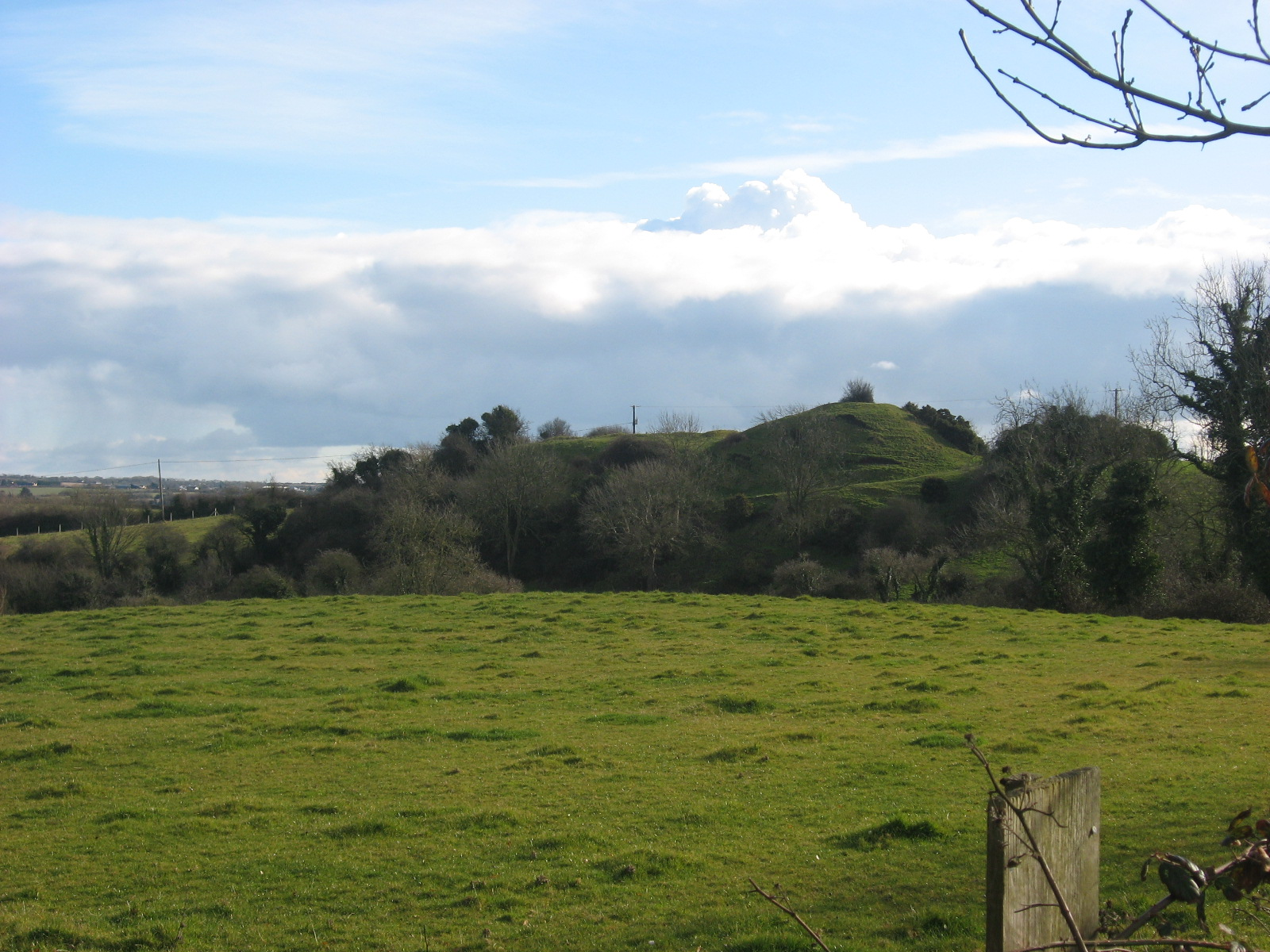

- Location within Ireland
- 53.877999°N 6.385855°W
- Type: motte
- Periods: Norman Ireland
- Cultures: Cambro-Norman, Old English
- Associated with: Normans
- Location: Greenmount, Castlebellingham, County Louth, Ireland
- Region: Dee Valley

History
- Built: 12th/13th century

Site notes
- Material: earth
- Height: 12 metres (39 ft)
- Area: 0.7 ha (1.7 acres)
- Excavation dates: 1830 and 1870
- Archaeologists: Rev. Joseph Dullaghan, John Henry Lefroy
- Public access: yes

National monument of Ireland
- Official name: Greenmount motte
- Reference no.: 144

Greenmount Motte is a motte and National Monument in County Louth, Ireland.

== Location ==
Greenmount Motte is located 2.9 km (1.8 mi) west of Annagassan, overlooking the Dee Valley.

== History and archaeology ==
Motte-and-bailey castles were a primitive type of castle built after the Norman invasion, a mound of earth topped by a wooden palisade and tower.

The motte at Greenmount was formerly known as Droim Chatha ("Battle Ridge", Anglicised Dromcath or Drumcath). A Nicholas of Drumcath (Nicholaus de Dromcath) is mentioned in a documents of 1310 and 1328.

The foundations of an elongated chamber (1.5 × 1 m in size, 5.5 m below the summit) are visible in the bailey.

A scabbard-mount with runic inscriptions (DOMNAL SELSHOFOTH A SOERTH THETA, "Domnal Seal's-head owned this sword") was found in excavation, but it believed to be long pre-Norman, indicating that the motte was constructed on the site of an earlier tumulus. Also found were animal bones, charcoal, burnt earth, a bronze axe and a bone harp peg with friction marks.

Greenmount was a camp ground for Catholic Irish forces in the Irish Rebellion of 1641. It was excavated in 1830, causing a cave-in, and again in 1870.
