= Dromiskin =

Village in County Louth, Ireland

Dromiskin Droim Ineasclainn
- Village
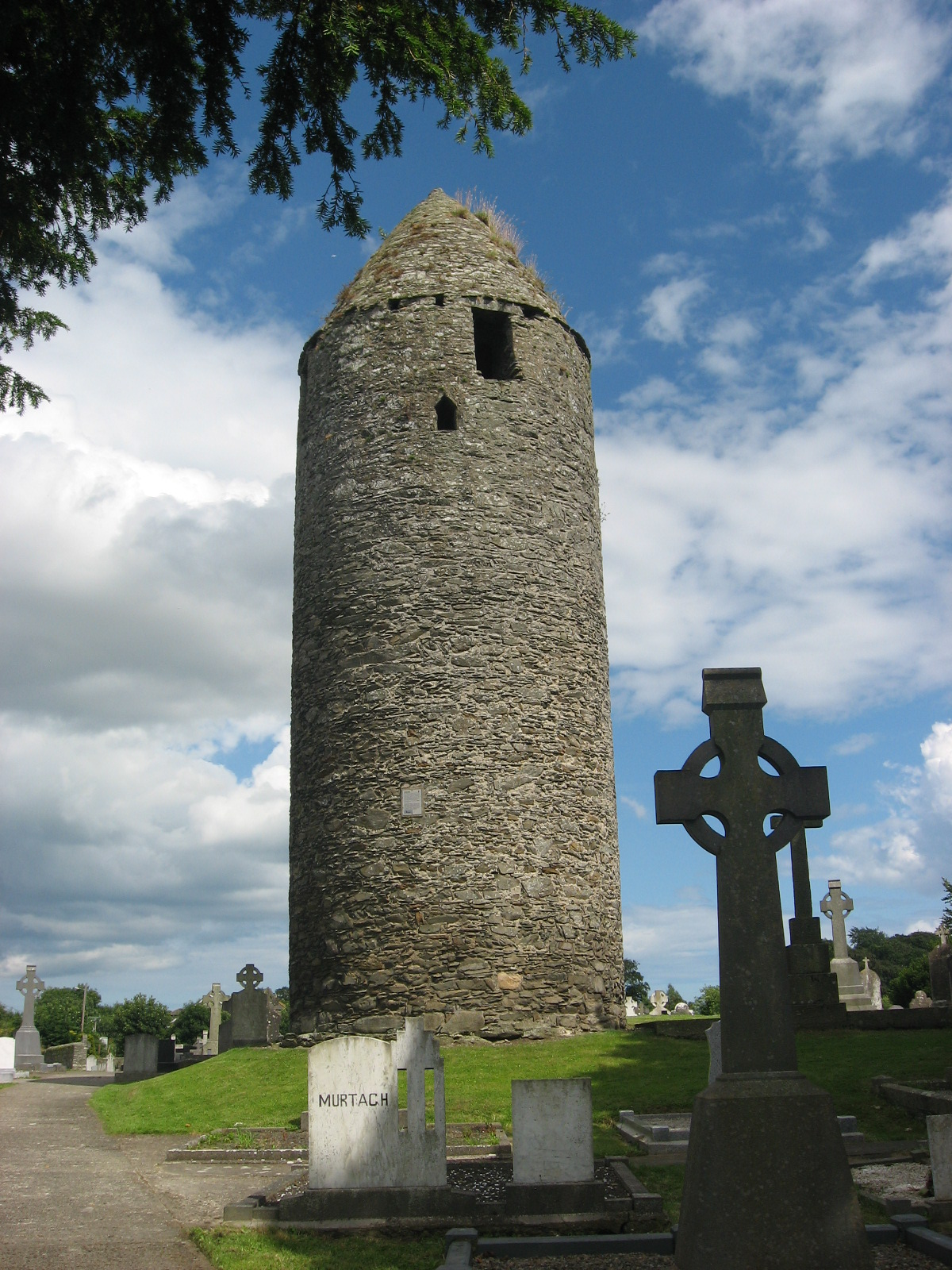
- Round tower at Dromiskin Monastery

- Location in Ireland
- Coordinates: 53°55′20″N 6°23′56″W
- Country: Ireland
- Province: Leinster
- County: County Louth

Area
  - Total: 4.47 km^{2} (1.73 sq mi)

Population (2016)
  - Total: 1,195
  - Density: 267/km^{2} (692/sq mi)
- Time zone: UTC+0 (WET)
  - Summer (DST): UTC-1 (IST (WEST))

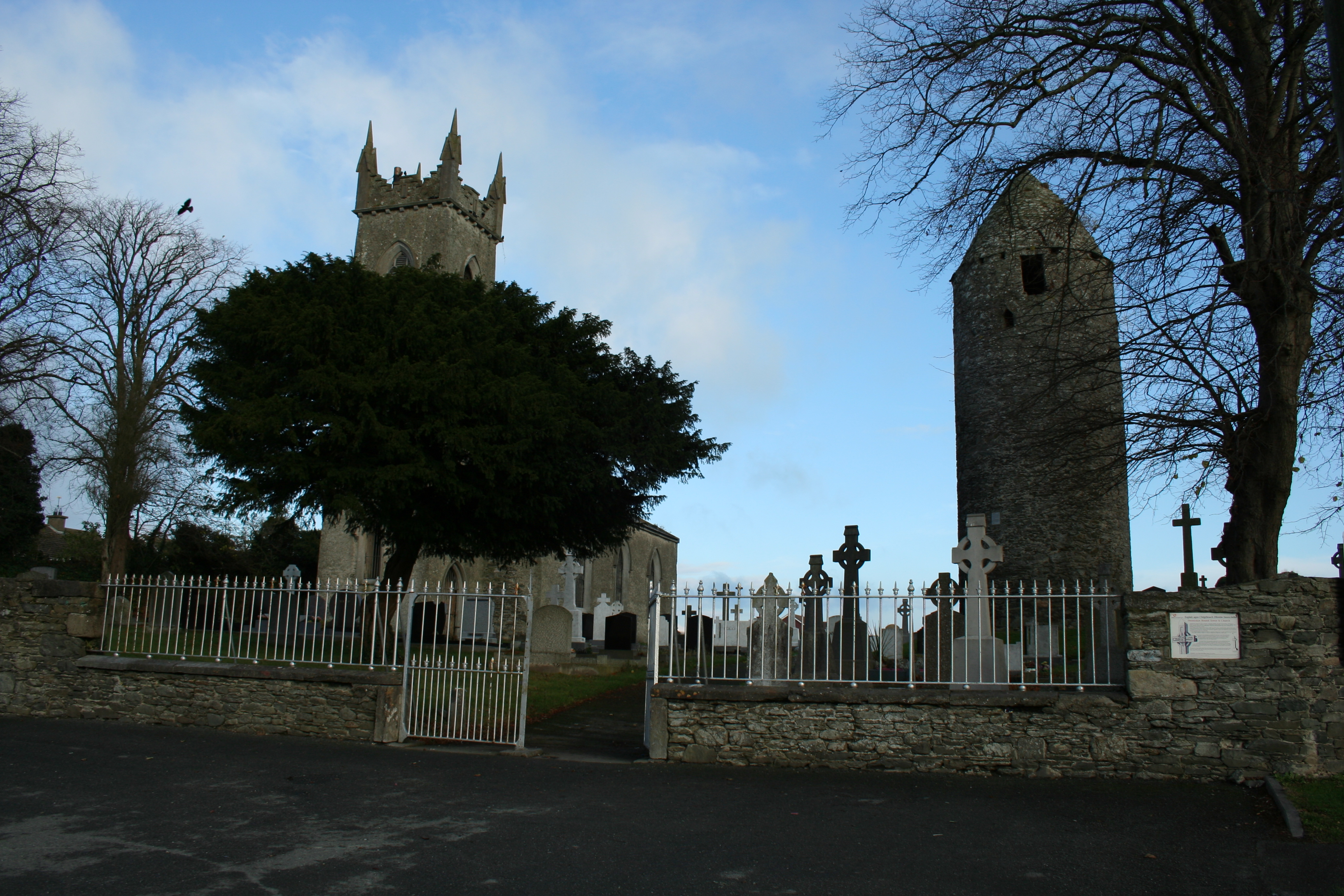
Round tower, cemetery, disused church at monastery site, Dromiskin

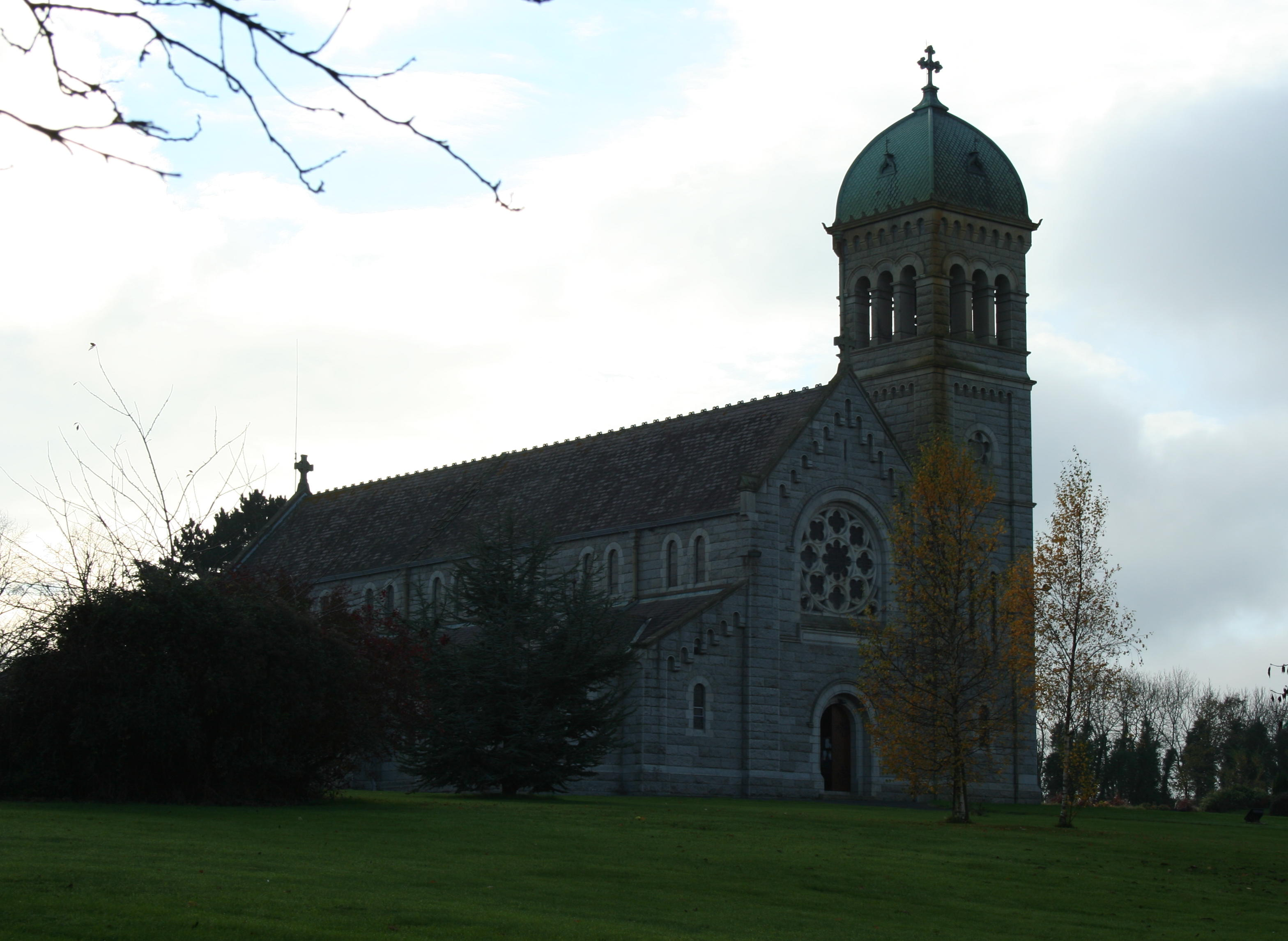
Roman Catholic Church, Dromiskin

Dromiskin (historically Druminisklin, from Irish: Droim Ineasclainn) is a village and townland in County Louth, Ireland. It is situated 10 km south of Dundalk, about 1 km inland from the Irish coast. The village is in a civil parish of the same name.

== History ==
The village was home to a monastery for hundreds of years, which was reputedly associated with Saint Patrick. The first bishop of Dromiskin was Lughaidh, son of Aengus mac Nadfraoch the first Christian king of Munster. St Patrick reputedly pierced Aengus's foot with his pastoral staff during the baptism, which he accepted was part of the ritual.

Áed Findliath monarch of Ireland, son of Niall Caille, retired to and died at Dromiskin. The Chronicon Scotorum records his death at 879. O'Donovan records his death as 876 and the Annals of Ulster place it at 878. Dromiskin was then in the territory of Conaille.

The next few hundred years were turbulent times for Dromiskin. The constant plundering by both Vikings and Irish destroyed the Abbey and dispersed the monks. Annudh macRuaire rampaged through the territory in 1043 and Dromiskin was destroyed. The ecclesiastical site was abandoned and the monks took refuge in the neighbouring Abbey of Saint Mochta, the possessions of this ancient church being placed in the hands of the Prior of Louth Abbey.

Dromiskin served as the home to the Archbishops of Armagh for a time. The Archbishops of Armagh lived at Dromiskin House. The 14th-century Archbishop Milo Sweetman is buried here.

The old ninth-century round tower and parts of the Abbey still remain. From the tower, there is a view of all of Dundalk Bay and the surrounding countryside.

== Parish ==
The village is part of the parish of Darver and Dromiskin parish, Darver being a neighbouring village. The parish is bounded by the Fane River on the north and by the Glyde River on the south.

== Demographics ==
Since the mid-1990s, Dromiskin, like many areas in County Louth, has seen an increase in population. In 2006, 992 people were living in Dromiskin. By 2016, the population of the village had increased to 1,195. According to 2016 census figures, 221 of the village's 391 private houses were built between 1991 and 2010.

== Sport ==
The local Gaelic football club, St. Joseph's, was formed in 1961. It covers the entire parish of Darver & Dromiskin, and won the Senior county championship (Joe Ward Cup) in 1996 and 2006.

As of 2011, the club was playing Intermediate level championship as well as Division 2 league football, having been relegated from League Division 1 in 2010. The club's Minor (U-18) team won the county championship for the first time in 2009 and retained the championship in 2010. St Peter's Athletic Club is located in the outskirts of the village.

== Transport ==
Bus Éireann route 168, Annagassan to Dundalk serves Dromiskin Mondays to Fridays inclusive providing one journey in each direction.

== Notable people ==
- William Boyle (1853–1923), dramatist and short story writer
- Sir Faithful Fortescue (1585–1666), a royalist commander during the English Civil War who bought lands at Dromiskin
- Patrick McDonnell, actor and comedian, known for playing Eoin McLove in the sitcom Father Ted
- Henry Ó Mealláin (c. 1579 – after 1642), Franciscan friar

== See also ==
- List of abbeys and priories in Ireland (County Louth)
- List of towns and villages in Ireland
