= Feartagar Castle =

- Caisleán Fhearta Ghearr (Irish)
- Jennings Castle
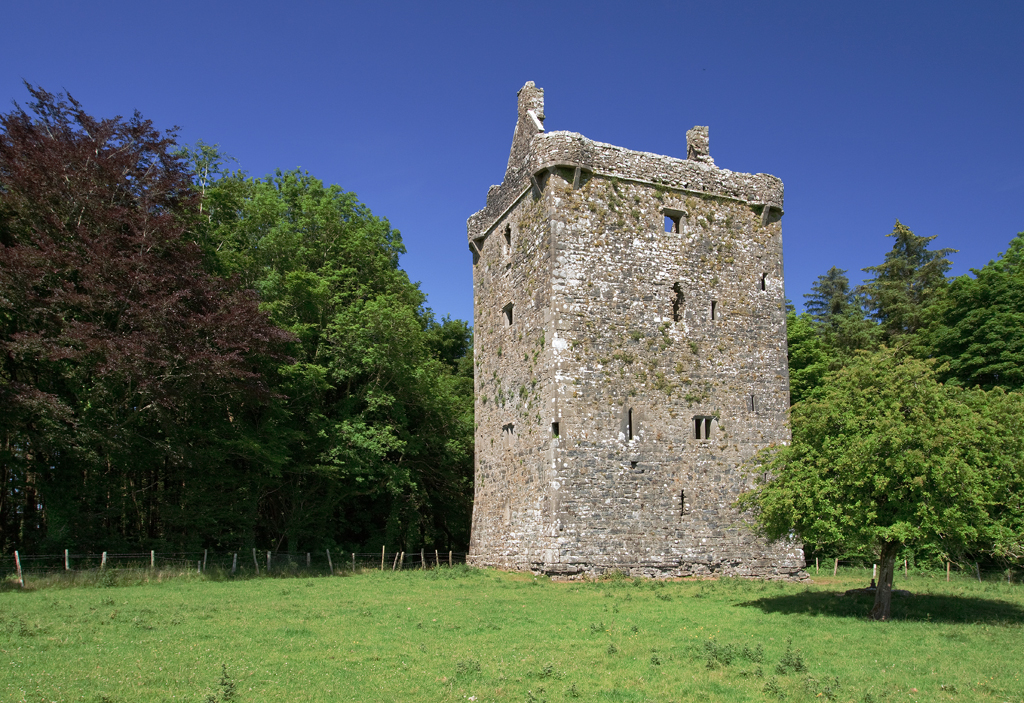

- Location within Ireland
- 53.569655°N 8.942657°W
- Type: tower house
- Location: Castlegrove East, Kilconly, County Galway, Ireland

History
- Built: 15th–17th century

Site notes
- Owner: State

National monument of Ireland
- Official name: Feartagar or Jennings Castle
- Reference no.: 428

Feartagar Castle, also called Jennings Castle, is a tower house and National Monument located in County Galway, Ireland.

== Location ==
Feartagar Castle lies on a hill 2.3 km (1.4 mi) east of Kilconly and 8.4 km (5.2 mi) northwest of Tuam, near to the River Nanny.

== History ==
The tower house was built in the 15th–17th century by the de Burgos (Burkes, de Búrca). Descendants of William de Burgh (c. 1160 – 1205/06), Anglo-Norman knight and close friend of King John, the Burkes ruled in Connacht for centuries. They were dispossessed in 1651 by the Cromwellian conquest of Ireland. The castle later came into the possession of the Blakes of Tuam.

== Description ==
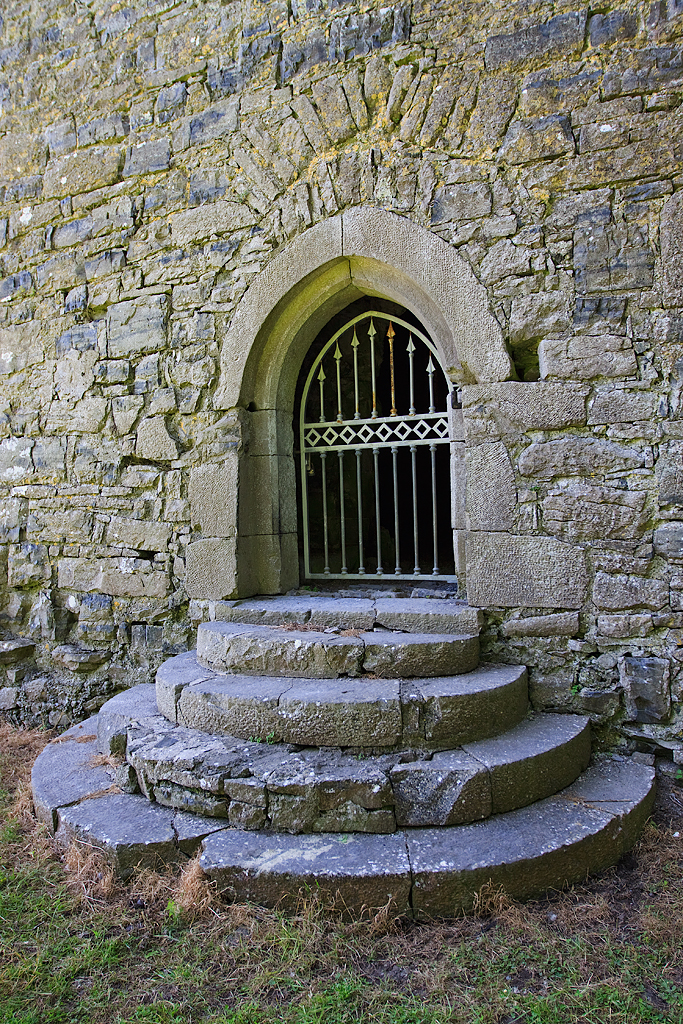
Entrance gate

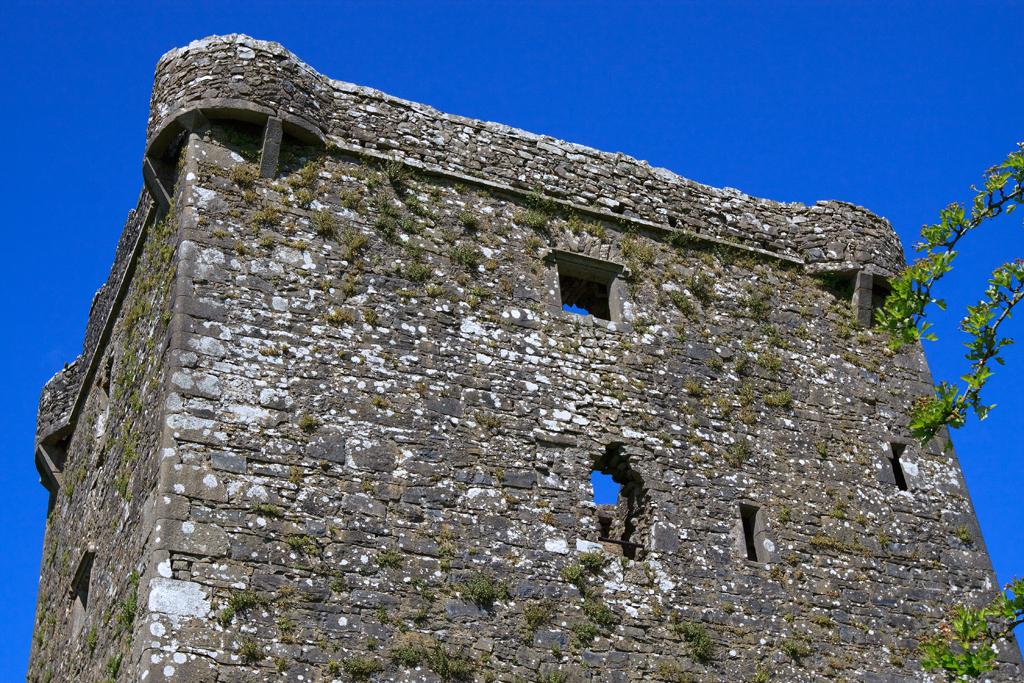
Bartizans

A five-storey tower house, 12 × 10 m at base (39 × 33 ft). Features include round bartizans on each corner, a machicolation above the doorway and a latrine chute. The second floor is vaulted and there are two stone staircases.
