= Dromiskin Monastery =

Monastery in County Louth, Ireland

- Druim-enesclaind; Druim-ineascluin; Droim Ineasclainn
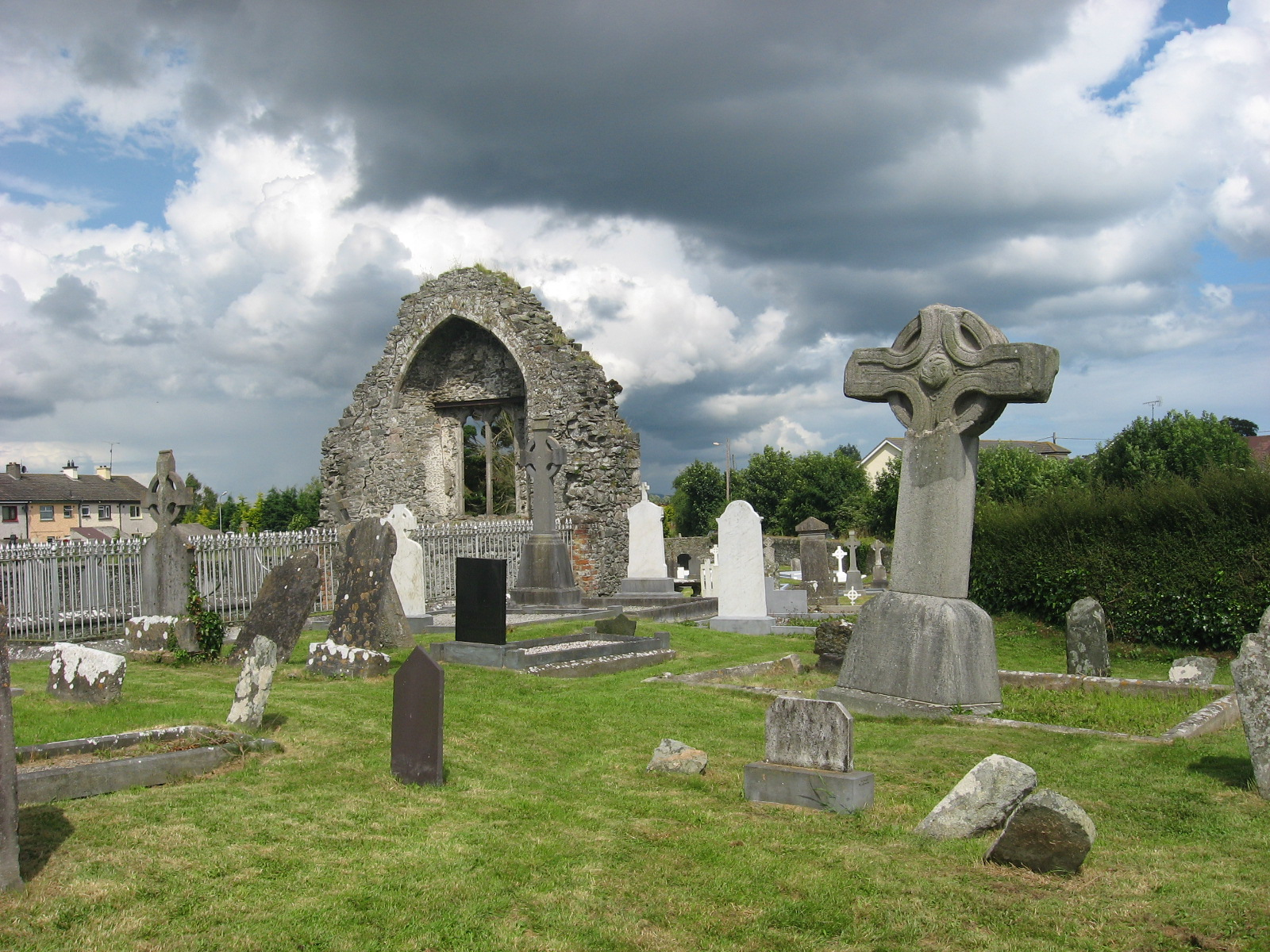
- Church remnants and high cross

- Location within Ireland
- Interactive map of Dromiskin Monastery

Monastery information
- Other name: Drumiskin
- Established: 6th century
- Disestablished: 12th century
- Diocese: Armagh

People
- Founder: Lugaid

Architecture
- Status: Inactive
- Style: Celtic monastic

Site
- Location: Chapel Road, Dromiskin, County Louth
- Coordinates: 53.922003°N 6.398219°W
- Visible remains: church, round tower, cross fragment
- Public access: yes

Dromiskin Monastery is a medieval monastery and National Monument located in Dromiskin, County Louth, in Ireland.

== Location ==
Dromiskin Monastery is located in the centre of Dromiskin village, halfway between the River Fane and River Glyde and 1.5 km (0.93 mi) west of the Irish Sea coast.

== History ==
The monastery at Dromiskin is said to have been founded by Lugaid (d. 515/516), a follower of Saint Patrick and son of Óengus mac Nad Froích, King of Munster, in the 6th century; or by Rónán, son of Bearach in the 7th century. Rónán died in 664 of buide-connaill ("yellow plague," an epidemic illness in ancient Ireland).

The round tower was constructed in the 9th century. Dromiskin was burned by Vikings in 833 (Annals of Ulster). The Uí Chrítáin were hereditary clergy at Dromiskin and it was pillaged by Domnall ua Néill in 970. The monastery was plundered by Irish in 908, Vikings in 978 and Irish again in 1043. It continued in operation until the 12th century.

== Buildings ==
=== Round tower ===
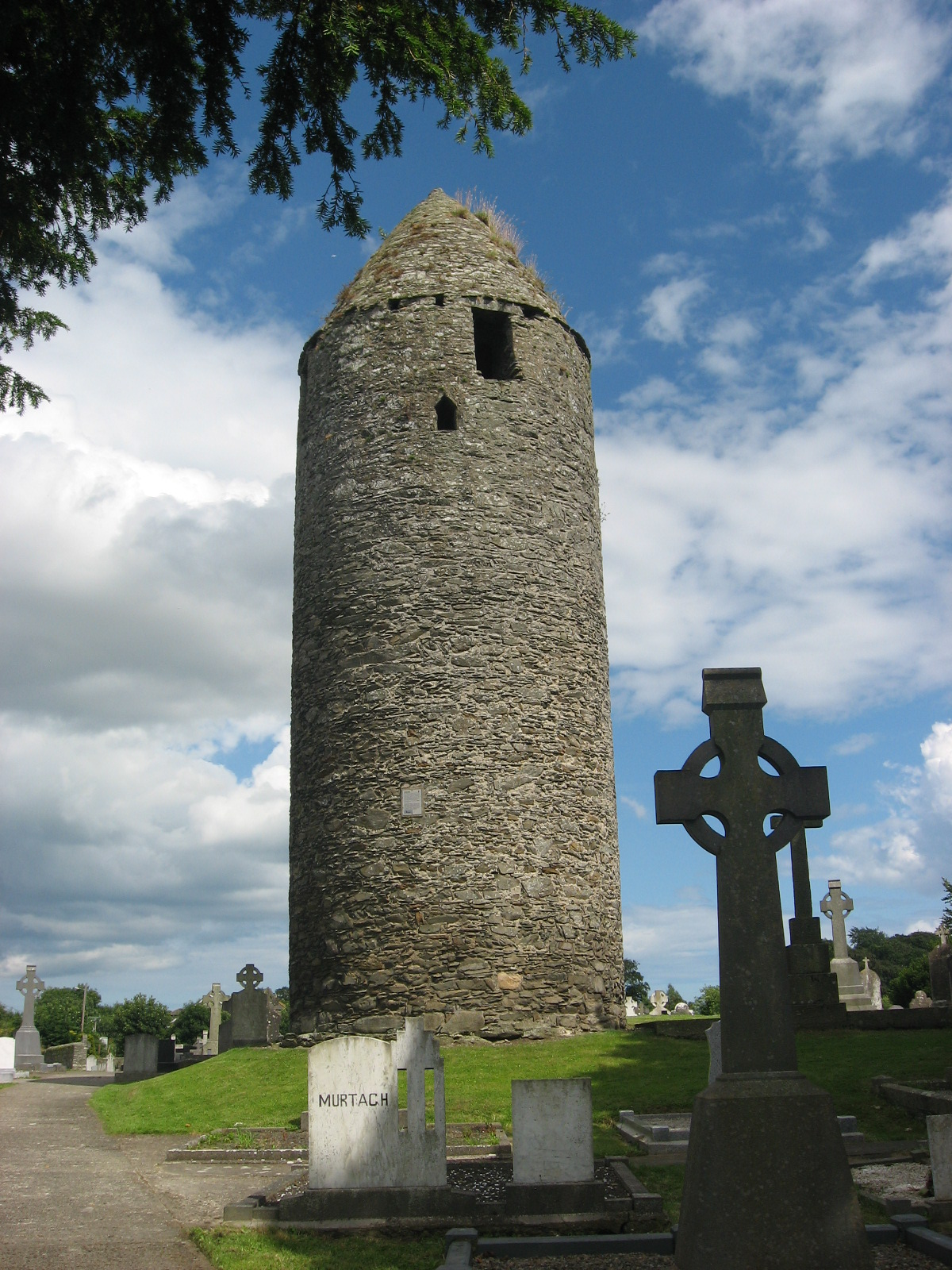
Round tower

Dromiskin Round Tower is relatively small at 15.25 m (50.0 ft) tall, with a conical cap and a two-order Romanesque doorway 3.7 m (12 ft) above ground. The upper portion was rebuilt around the 12th century and used as a bell tower, and remained in use until the 19th century.

=== High cross ===
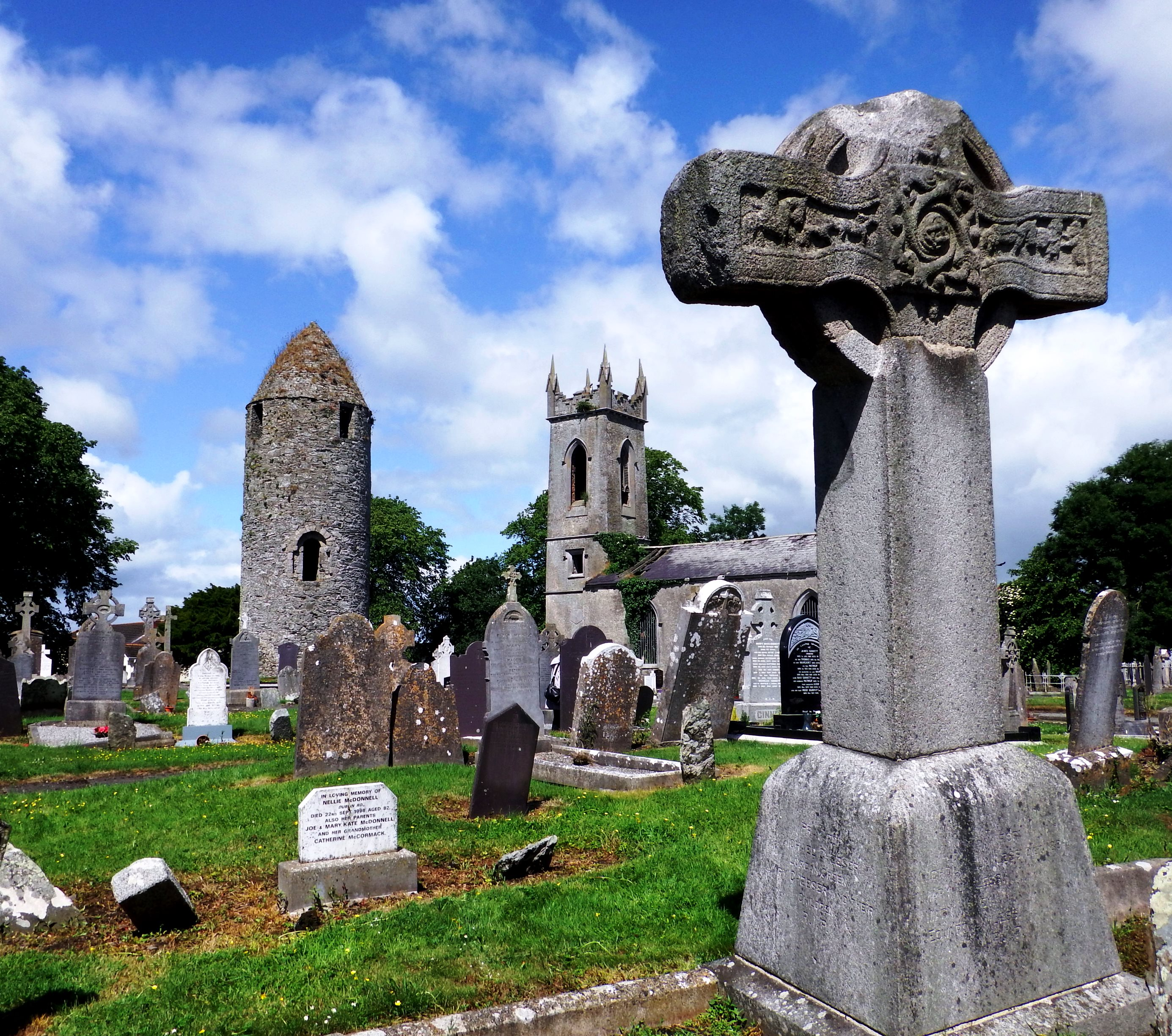
Round tower and high cross

The arms of a high cross (10th century AD) are mounted on a modern shaft (1918). Some accounts associate it with Áed Findliath (High King of Ireland 862–879). One panel is believed to show David presenting Goliath's head to Saul. Also carved on it are dragons and a crucifixion.

=== Church ===
The gable and foundation of a 12th century church with 15th century window remain at Dromiskin.

== See also ==
- List of abbeys and priories in Ireland (County Louth)
