= Linn Duachaill =

Viking fort in County Louth, Ireland

Coordinates: 53.8888°N 6.3578°W

Linn Duachaill (Irish pronunciation: [ˌl̠ʲiːn̠ʲ ˈd̪ˠuəxəl̠ʲ]; "Duachall's pool") is the name of a Viking longphort near the village of Annagassan, County Louth, Ireland. The settlement was built in 841 CE, the same time as the settlement of Dubh Linn, or Dublin. In contrast to Dublin, the settlement was abandoned. It has been argued that possibly because of changing tidal patterns, it lacked continuous access to the sea. The tides would have made access to the water difficult for a number of hours per day.

== History ==
The longphort of Linn Duachaill is first mentioned in Irish annals of the 840s. A certain Tergeis or Turgesius, as he is called in the annals, is said to have founded forts at Dubh Linn and Linn Duachaill, from which the "surrounding territories and churches were plundered and preyed." This Turgesius was a colourful figure: he apparently brought the north of Ireland under his rule and enthroned his wife on the high altar of the cathedral at the monastery of Clonmacnoise, but was taken prisoner in 843 by Máel Sechnaill mac Máele Ruanaid and drowned in Loch Nar.

== Site discovery ==
The archeological site of Linn Duachaill was discovered in 2010 on a flat area on the River Glyde, after a team of archeologists and a geophysicist had searched from 2005 to 2007 and found a pattern of straight ditches, unlike the usually circular forts built by the native population. The initial drive for the excavation came from a local filmmaker, Ruth Cassidy, member of the local historical society. The announcement that the finds were identified as Linn Duachaill was made in September 2010. Since the site is on agricultural land, it is very well preserved.

Three test trenches were dug. The team, headed by archeologist Mark Clinton, excavated a "defensive rampart, consisting of a deep ditch and a bank." This wall would have protected the fort on one side, while the other sides would have been protected by the River Glyde and the Irish Sea. Objects found include "Viking ship rivets, cut-up Viking silver and looted Irish metalwork," besides "part of a human skull, a whorl for spinning thread and a brooch pin."

The nearby hillfort Lisnaran Fort was traditionally associated with Linn Duachaill, although it is also claimed that Lisnaran is Gaelic rather than Viking.
