= Kilconly =

Village in County Galway, Ireland

Coordinates: 53°34′24″N 8°58′22″W

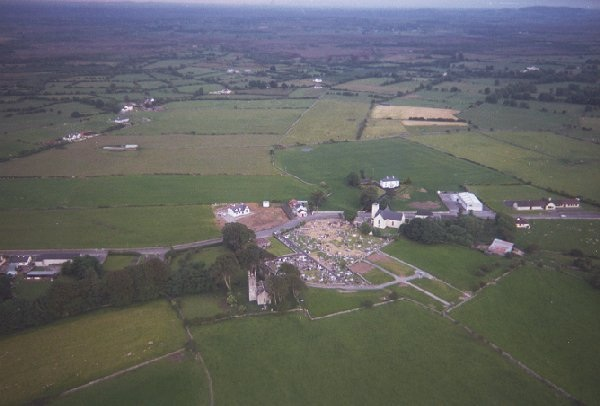
Village from the north

Kilconly is a small rural village near Tuam which is north of Galway City in County Galway, Ireland. It is situated about 12km north west of Tuam town on the Ballinrobe road (R332).

== Facts ==
- Feartagar Castle is located 2.3 km (1.4 mi) to the east.
- Birthplace of British prison reformer Mary Size.
- Kilconly GAA is the local Gaelic Athletic Association club.

== See also ==
- List of towns and villages in Ireland
