= Tower houses in Great Britain and Ireland =

Group of castles in Britain and Ireland

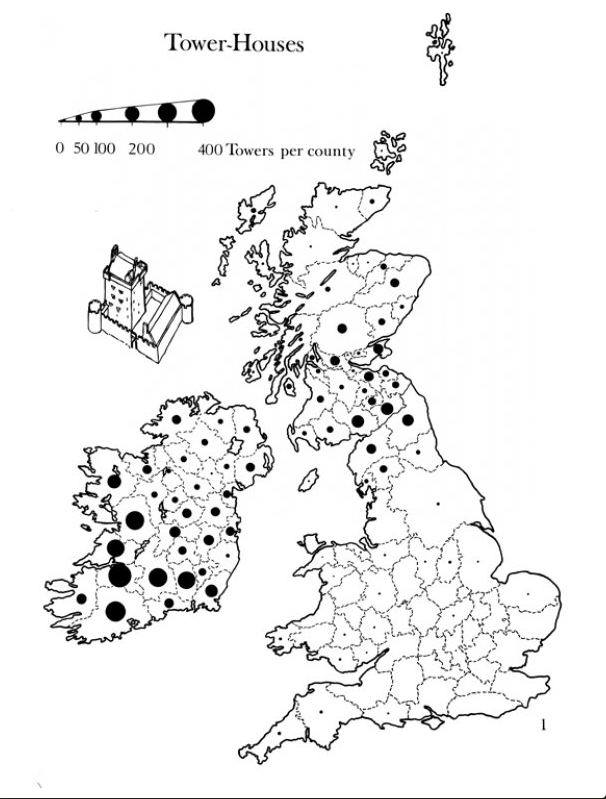
Distribution of tower houses in Great Britain and Ireland

Tower houses (Irish: caisleán) appeared on the islands of Great Britain and Ireland starting from the High Middle Ages. These house-fortifications were constructed in the wilder parts of Great Britain and Ireland, particularly in Scotland, and throughout Ireland, until at least up to the 17th century. The remains of such structures are dotted around the Irish and Scottish countryside, with a particular concentration in the Scottish Borders where they include peel towers and bastle houses. Some are still intact and even inhabited today, while others stand as ruined shells.

== Scottish tower houses ==
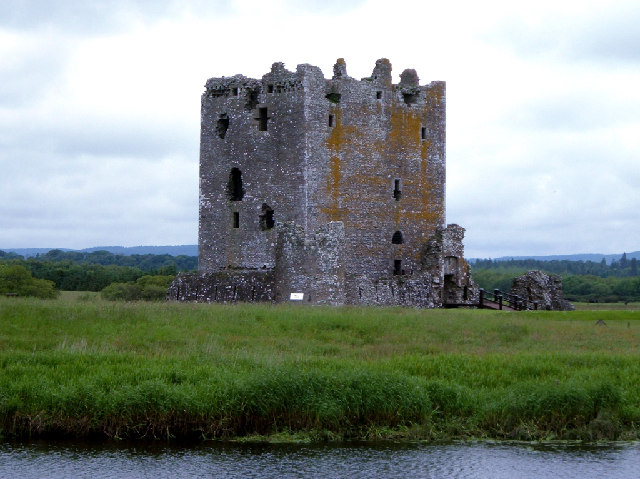
Threave Castle, Dumfries and Galloway. The 15th century outer wall replaced earlier domestic buildings.

Tower houses are often called castles, and despite their characteristic compact footprint size, they are formidable habitations and there is no clear distinction between a castle and a tower house. Some tower houses were built within earlier castles, as at Dunnottar and Edinburgh (David's Tower), while other towers, such as Craigmillar, were later surrounded with outer walls and other buildings to develop them into "full" castles. Tower houses could also become subsumed within later residential extensions, built after the need for defence had subsided, as at Glamis. A widely accepted classification system is based on ground plan. The simplest towers were rectangular, with later examples being L-plan (with a side-wing) or Z-plan (with two wings at diagonally-opposite corners). One example of an L-plan tower was the original layout (prior to enlargement) of Muchalls Castle. Crookston Castle is an X-plan tower house (with a tower at each corner). A rare and unusually massively-built C-plan (or U-plan) tower, with two wings on the same face of the main tower, is Borthwick. Later 16th and 17th century towers, built when the military threat appeared to have subsided, had decorative crowns of tourelles and balustrades instead of defensive battlements. Nevertheless, tower houses were besieged in the Wars of the Three Kingdoms of 1639-51, with some, such as Neidpath and Borthwick, sustaining severe damage from artillery barrages that they were not built to resist. Tower houses continued to be built after the Restoration, such as Cluny Crichton (1666).

The few surviving round Scottish Iron Age towers known as brochs are often compared to tower houses, having mural passages and a battered (sloping) base, although the entrances to brochs are far less ostentatious. The only round tower house is Orchardton Tower.

L-plan tower house at Dunnottar Castle.

Z-plan tower at Claypotts Castle.

C-plan tower at Borthwick Castle.

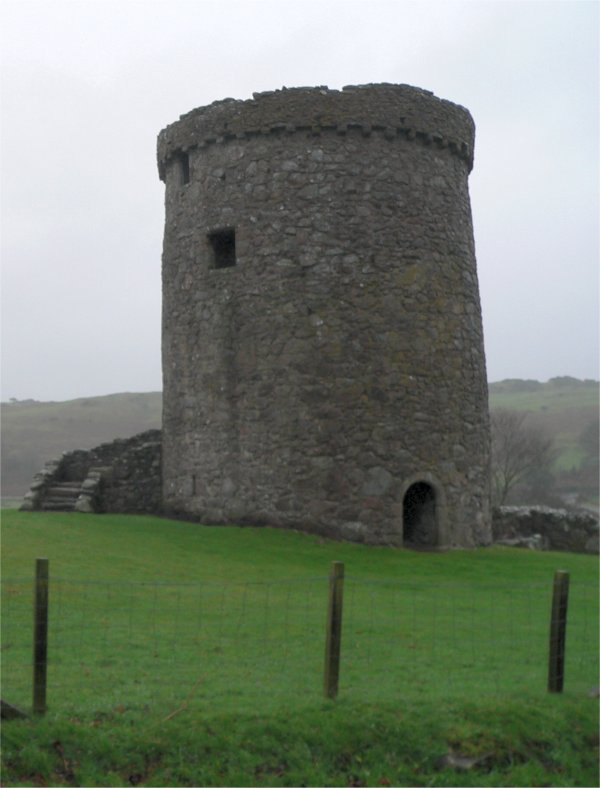
Round tower at Orchardton

Late tower, with ornamental crown, at Craigievar Castle.

== English tower houses ==
Belsay Castle

Tower houses were built in several parts of England, particularly the Scottish border. While English towers were generally smaller than their Scottish counterparts, many falling into the peel tower category, some large examples survive, especially in Northumberland. Of these, one of the largest is Langley Castle, where the main tower is surrounded by five smaller towers, one set aside for the latrines. Several Northumbrian towers, including Belsay and Chipchase, had machicolations and squat round bartizans corbelled out at the corners. Kirkandrews Tower in Cumbria owes more to Scottish architecture in its sheer profile and prominent gabled top.

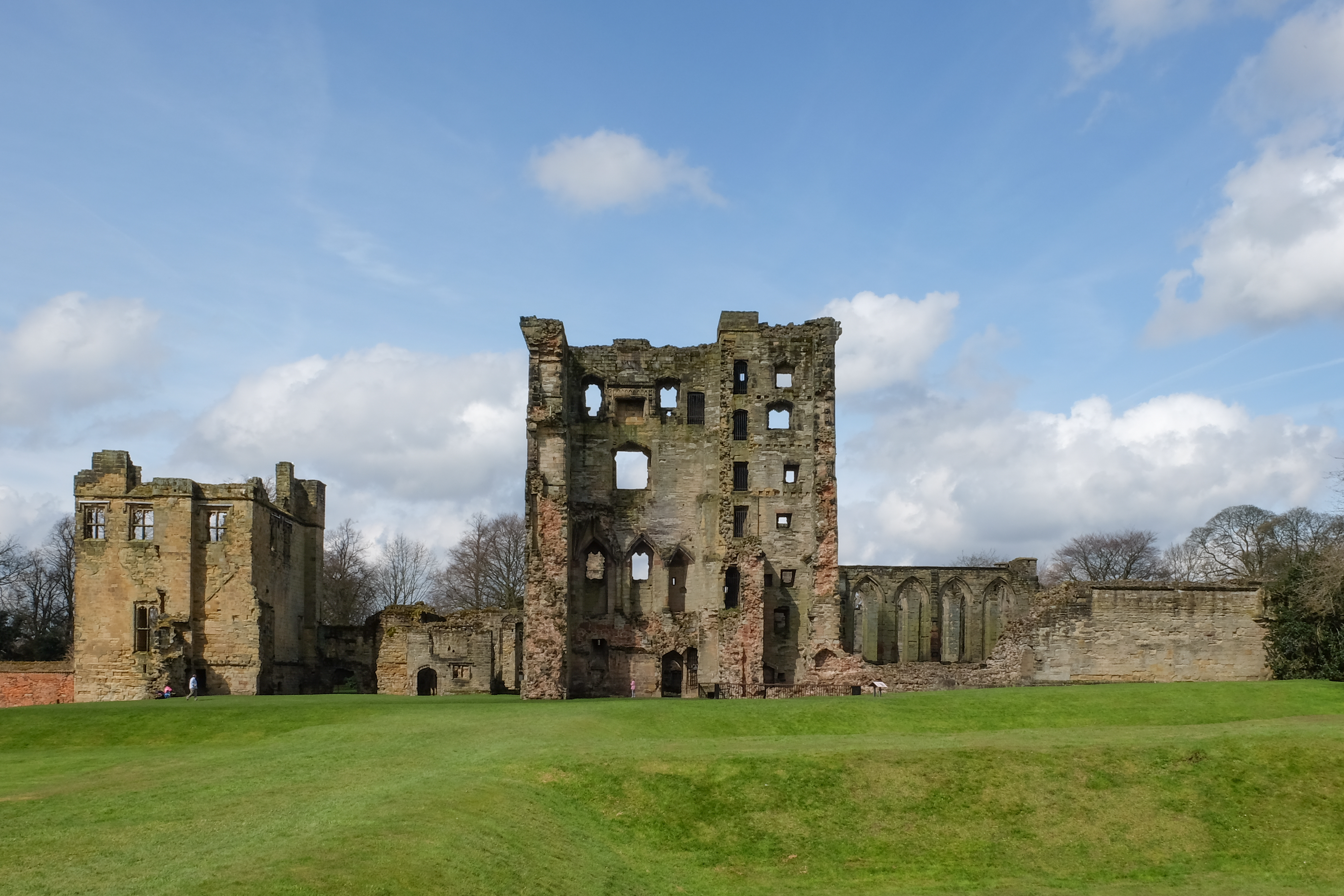
Ashby-de-la-Zouch Castle, with the tower at the centre. The nearer half of the building was destroyed by slighting in the Civil War.

It is debatable whether the prominent towers built at several major English castles and houses in the 14th and 15th centuries may be considered tower houses, later forms of keeps or another category altogether. Examples include the uniquely-planned tower on the motte at Warkworth, the militarily weak brick tower at Tattershall, the L-plan tower at Ashby-de-la-Zouch, the mostly demolished tower at Hunsdon, and possibly Richard III's unfinished artillery tower at Warwick (the Bear Tower). The independence (both militarily and functionally) of these structures from their castles varied, and they have been linked to the theory of bastard feudalism. They may have been influenced by Henry V's palace at Sheen (Richmond), itself derived from French examples such as Vincennes.

== Welsh tower houses ==
The Old Rectory, Angle

Tower houses were never particularly numerous in Wales, as it was conquered and largely pacified in the 13th century, before the age of tower house construction. Welsh towers are concentrated in Pembrokeshire and are generally small; an example is the Old Rectory, Angle.

== Irish tower houses ==
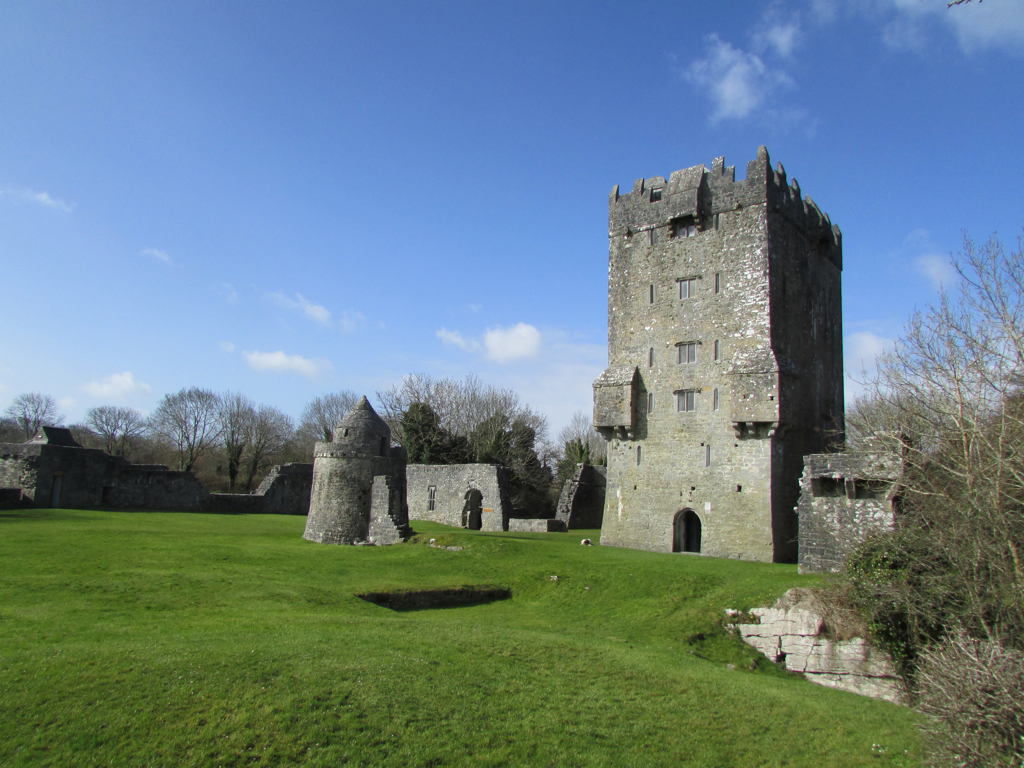
Aughnanure Castle, a tower house and bawn in County Galway, Ireland

Irish archaeologist Tom Finan makes the case that while the precise origins of the Irish tower house are "shady", "the Irish hall house is in fact the parent of the Irish tower house". Tadhg O'Keefe has stressed that the terms ‘hall’, 'hall-house', and 'tower-house' have become needlessly entangled. While archaeologist Thomas Johnson Westropp preferred the term 'peel houses' for these types of fortified residences, the term 'tower house' became more widely used from the early 20th century, with the work and publications of architect and antiquarian Harold Graham Leask.

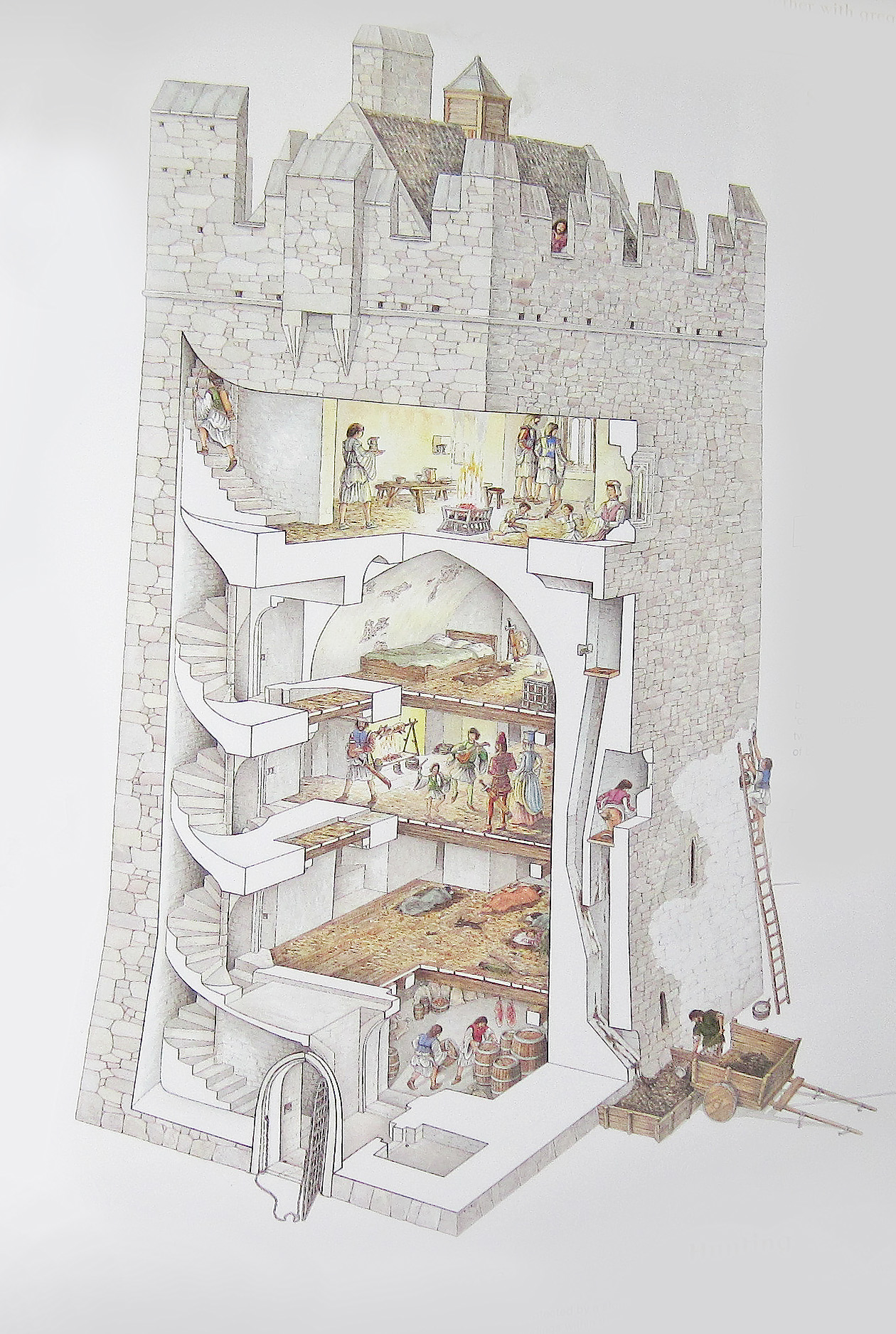
A reconstruction cut-away drawing of Ross Castle in County Kerry. It shows life inside the tower house, with men and women present; servants and the social elite; cooking and dancing; and children playing.

Whether an evolution of an earlier form or otherwise, many tower houses were built in Ireland between the early 15th and 17th centuries, with over two thousand tower houses remaining extant. After 1500, many lords built fortified houses, although the introduction of the cannon slowly rendered such defences obsolete. It is possible many were built after King Henry VI of England introduced a building subsidy of £10 in 1429 to every man in the Pale who wished to build a castle within 10 years (Statute Rolls of the Parliament of Ireland, Reign of Henry VI, pp 33–5). However recent studies have undermined the significance of this grant, demonstrating that there were many similar grants at different times and in different areas, and because many were built in areas outside English control.

They were built by both the Anglo-Irish and Gaelic Irish, with some constructed by English and Scottish immigrants during successive conquests of Ireland between the 1570s and 1690s. Many were positioned within sight of each other and a system of visual communication is said to have been established between them, based on line of sight from the uppermost levels, although this may simply be a result of their high density. County Kilkenny has several examples of this arrangement such as Ballyshawnmore and Neigham. County Clare is known to have had approximately 230 tower houses in the 17th century, some of which were later surveyed by the Irish antiquarian Thomas Johnson Westropp in the 1890s. Intact examples include: Aughnanure Castle, Belvelly Castle, Bunratty Castle, Narrow Water Castle, Rathmacknee Castle, Rockfleet Castle and Roodstown Castle.

The Irish tower house was used for both defensive and residential reasons, with many lordly dynasties building them on their demesne lands in order to assert status and provide a residence for the senior lineage of the family. Many had a defensive wall around the building, known as a bawn (Irish: bábhún).

== Plans ==
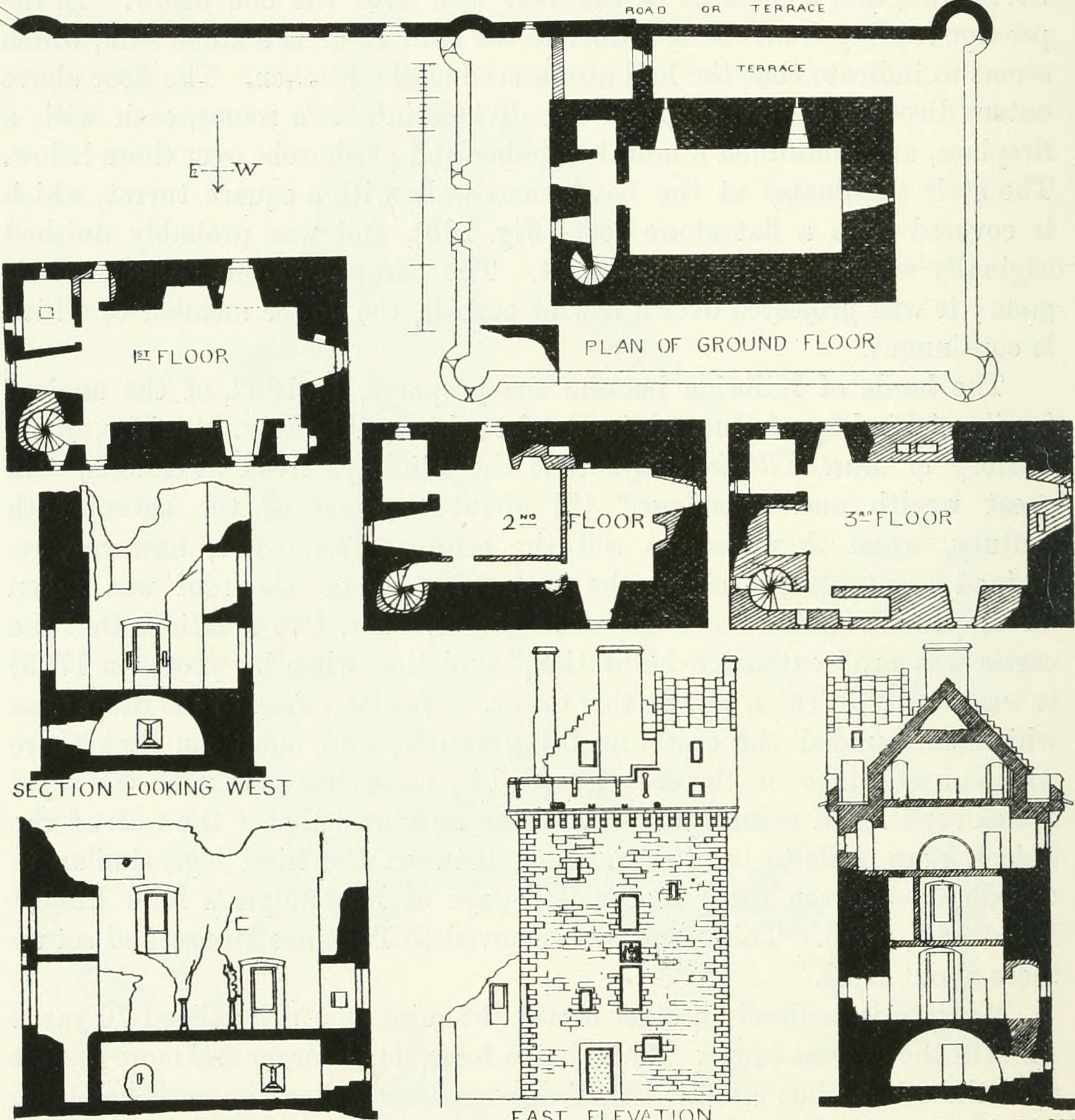
Rectangular tower: Cathcart Castle (demolished 1980)

L-plan tower: Merchiston Tower.

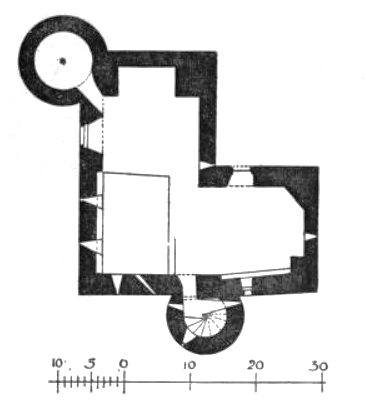
Z-plan tower: Corse Castle.

C-plan tower: Borthwick Castle

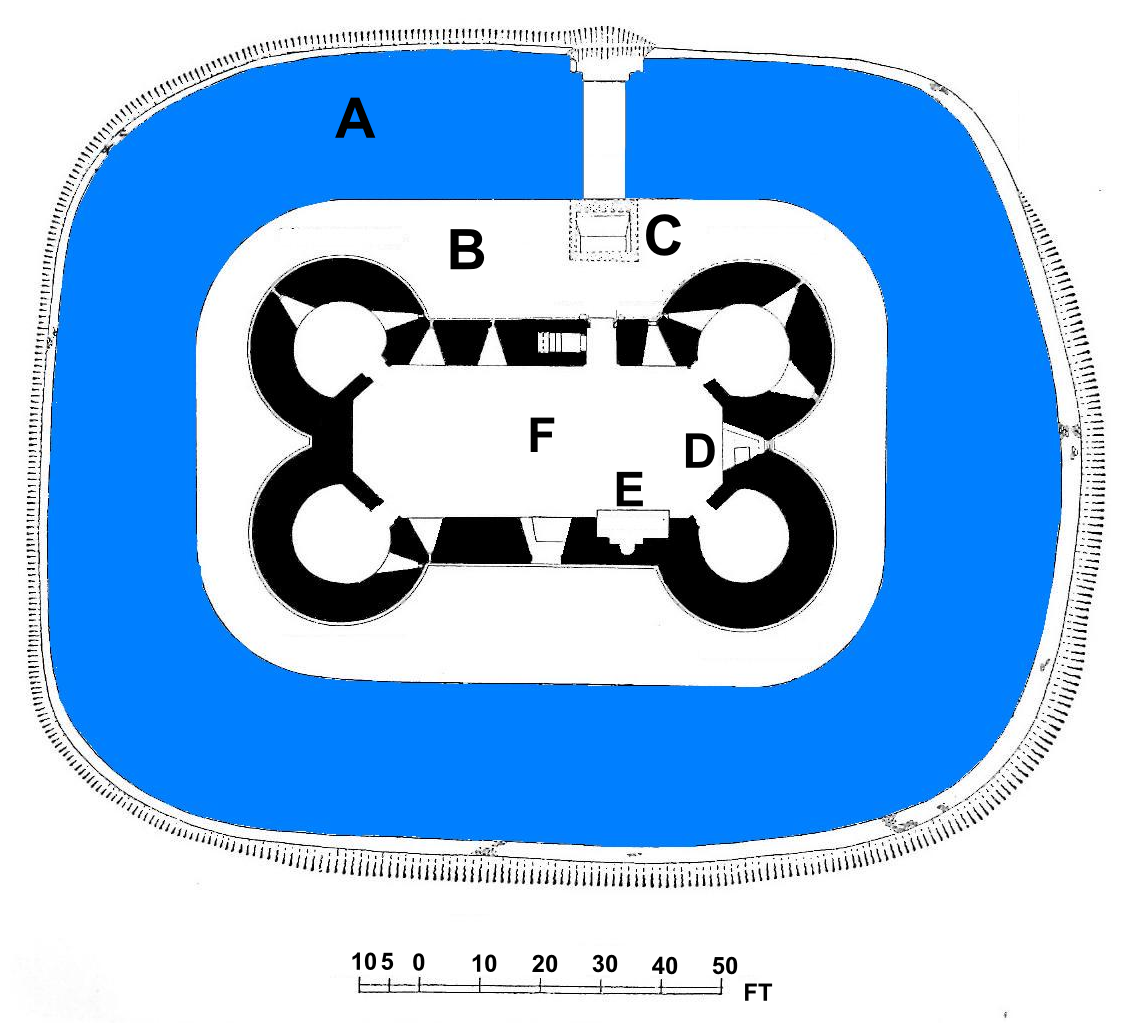
Tower house with corner turrets: Nunney Castle.

== See also ==
- Architecture in early modern Scotland § Vernacular architecture (section)
- Bawn
- Scottish Vernacular
- Vernacular architecture
- Welsh Tower houses
