= Bartizan =

Small turret projecting from the top of towers or parapets

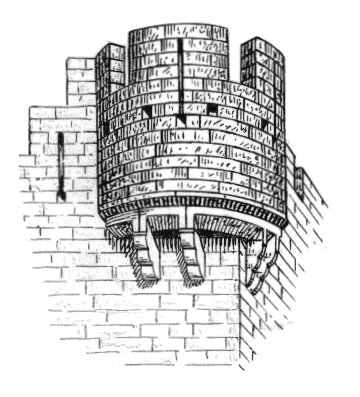
Drawing of a bartizan

A bartizan (an alteration of bratticing), also called a guerite, garita, or échauguette, or spelled bartisan, is an overhanging turret projecting from the walls of late-medieval and early-modern fortifications from the early 14th century up to the 18th century. Most frequently found at corners, they protected a warder and enabled him to see his surroundings. Bartizans are generally furnished with oillets or arrow slits. The turret was usually supported by stepped masonry corbels and could be round, polygonal or square.

Bartizans were incorporated into many notable examples of Scottish Baronial architecture. In the architecture of Aberdeen, the new Town House, built in 1868–74, incorporates bartizans in the West Tower.

== Gallery ==
=== On walls ===
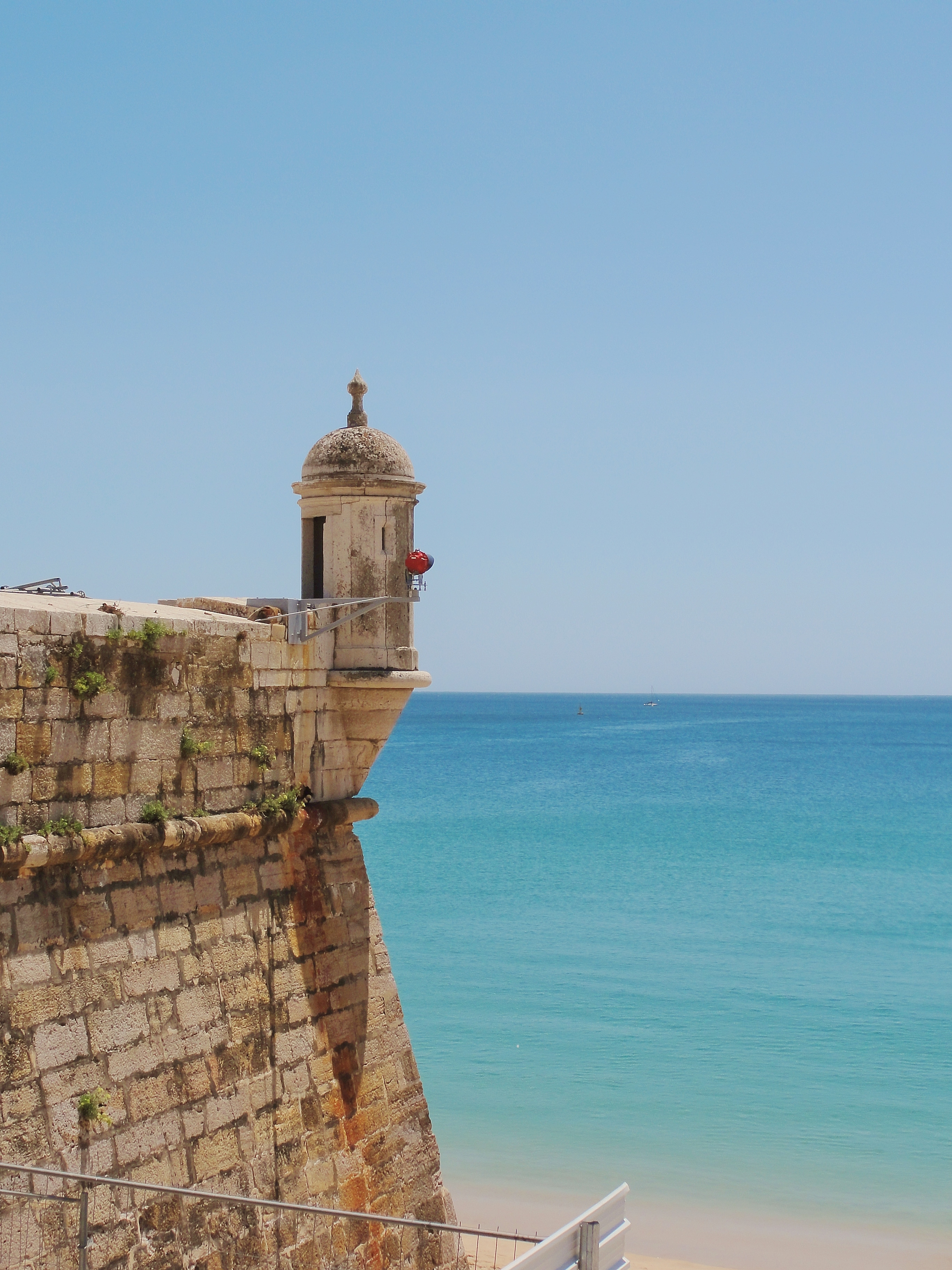
Guarita at Fortaleza de Santiago, Sesimbra Municipality, Portugal

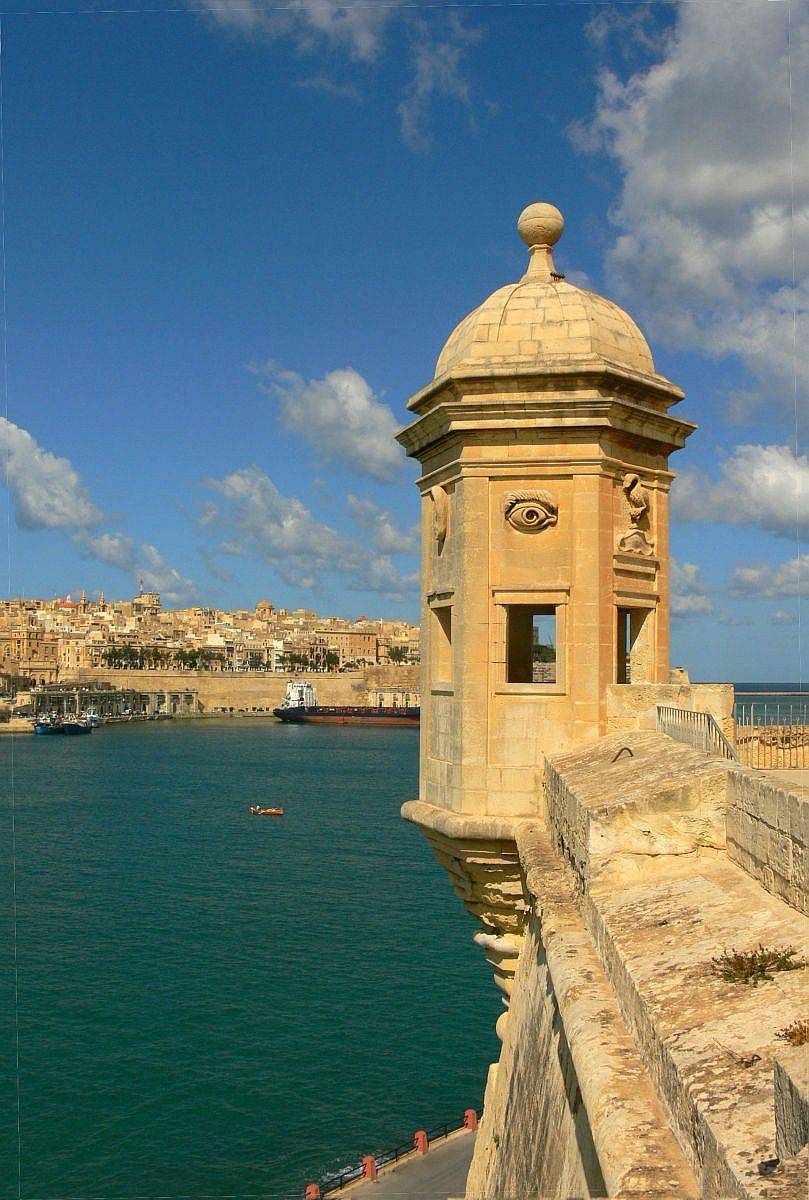
Gardjola at the Spur, Senglea, Malta

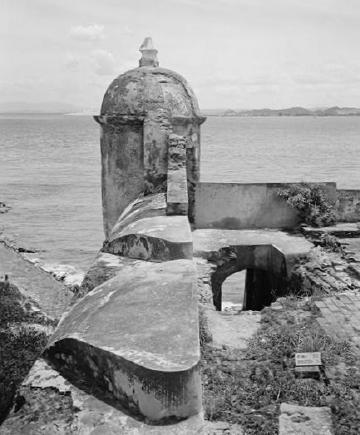
Garita at El Cañuelo in the Bay of San Juan, Puerto Rico

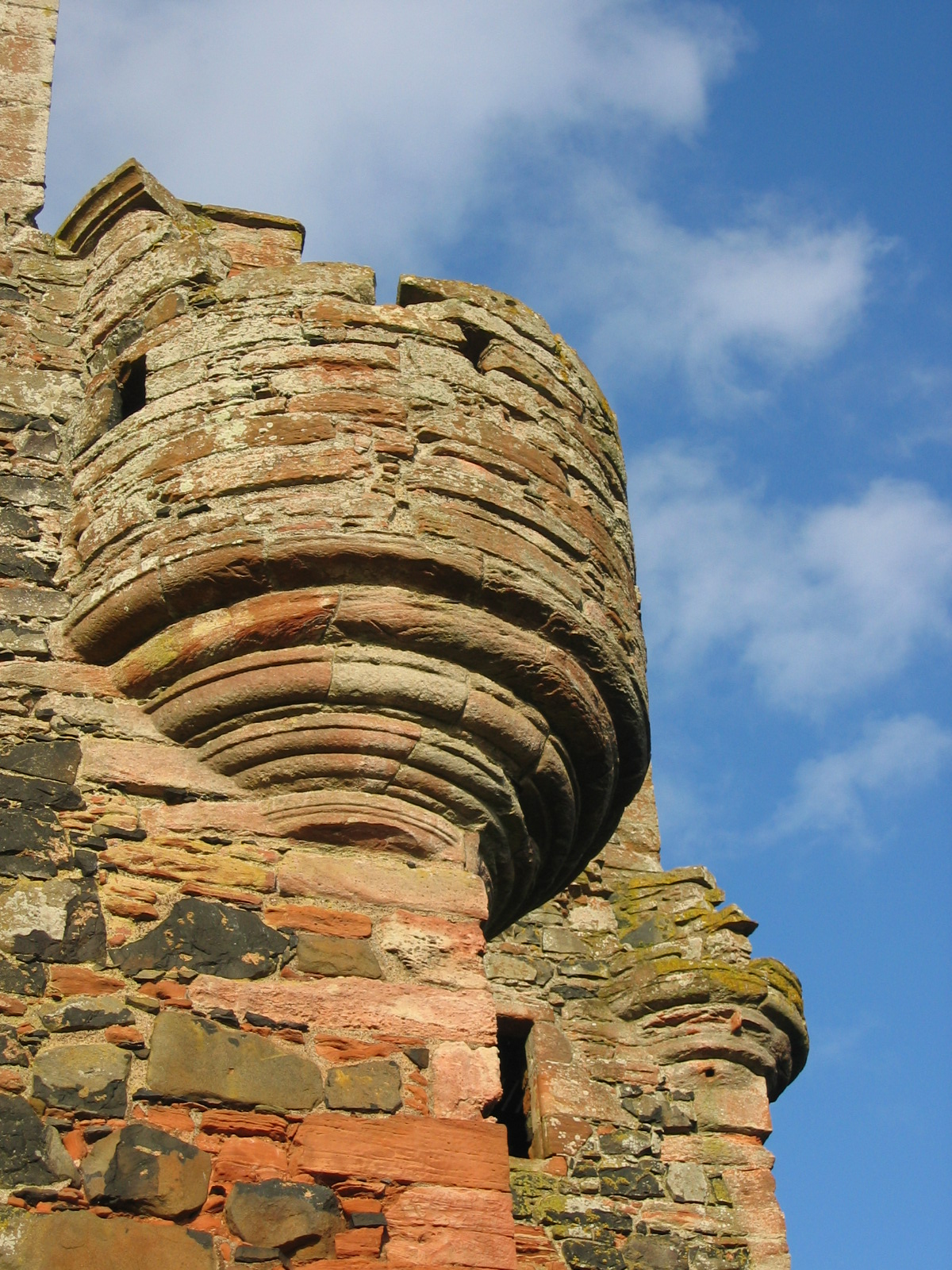
South-East Bartizan on Greenknowe Tower, Scottish Borders (and another one in the background)

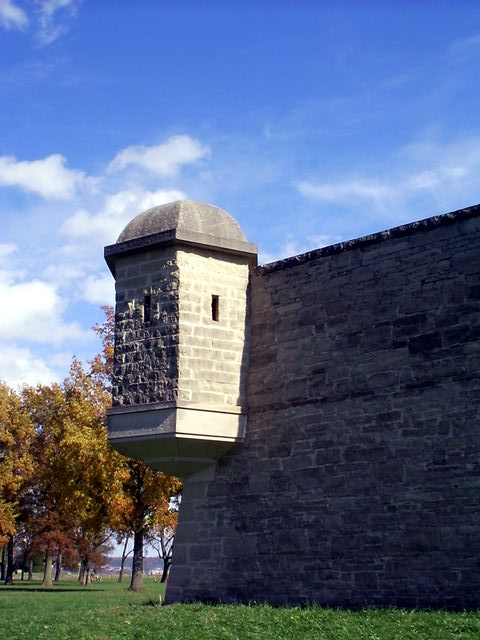
Bartizan at Fort de Chartres, a French colonial era fort in Illinois on the Mississippi River

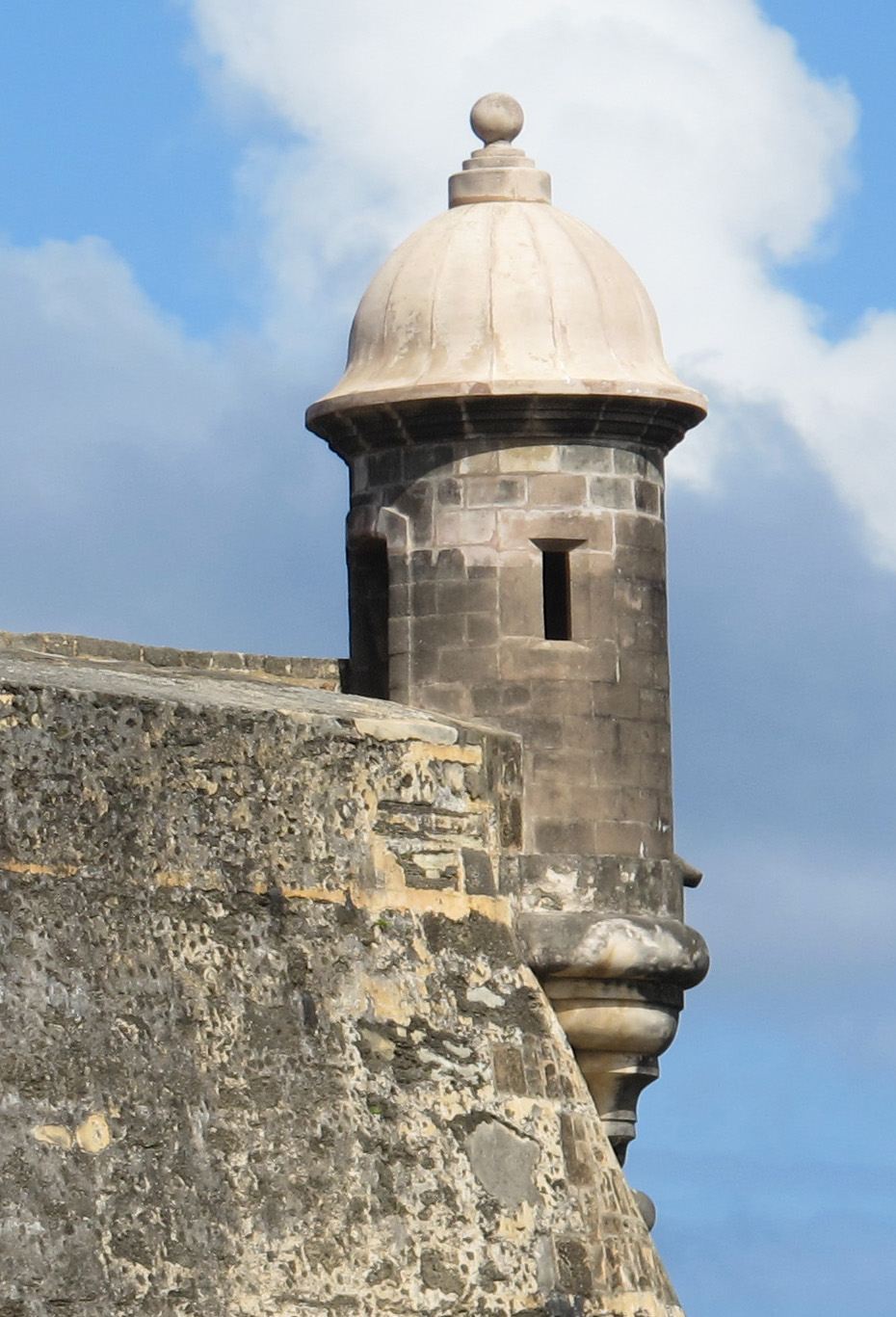
Garita at Castillo San Cristóbal (San Juan) in San Juan, Puerto Rico

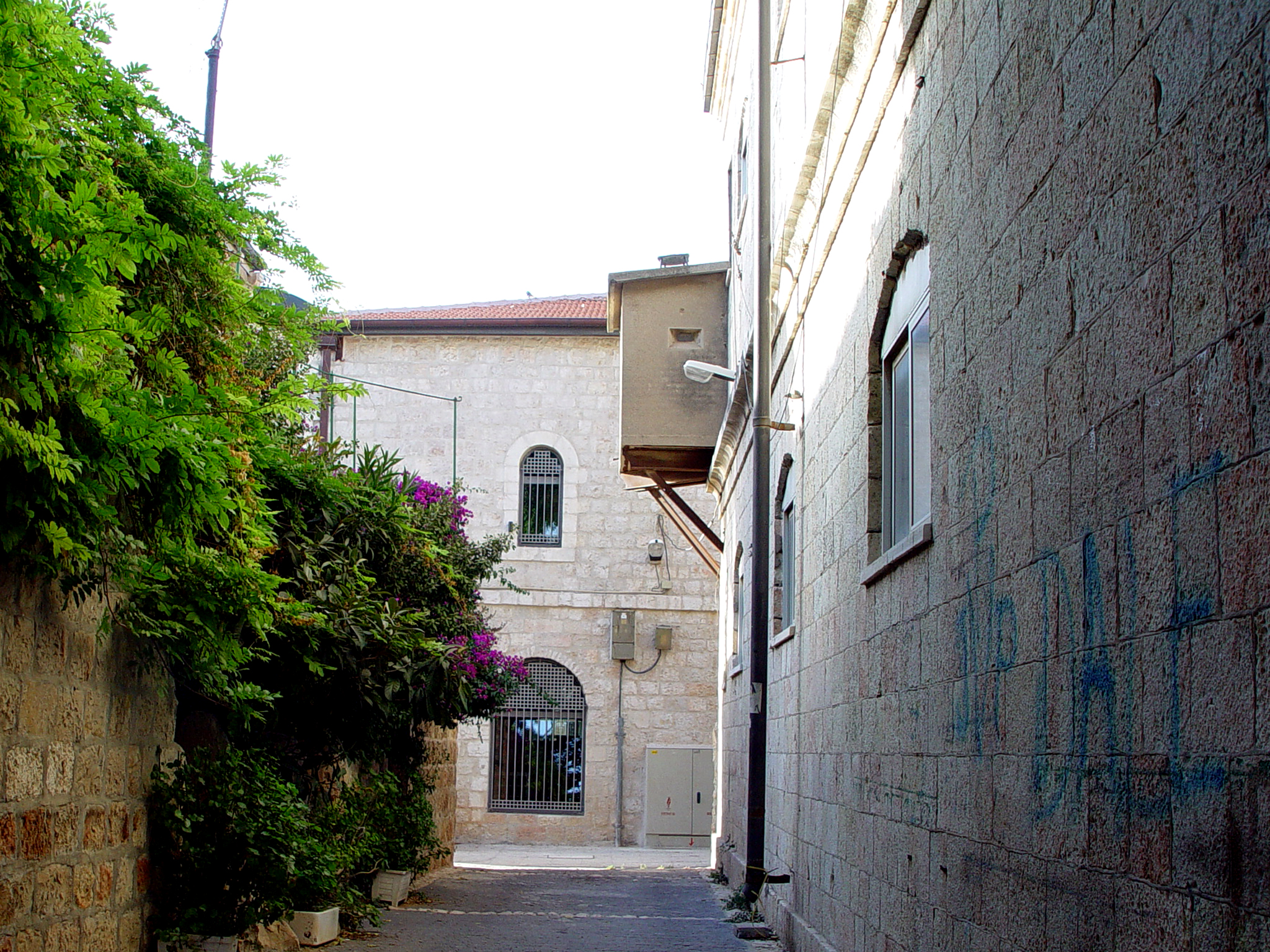
A bartizan-style British concrete position at Sergei courtyard, Jerusalem. This is probably the sole existing testimony of the British "Bevingrad" constructed in 1946.

Devil's Sentry Box, or the "Garita del Diablo", San Cristóbal Castle, in San Juan, Puerto Rico

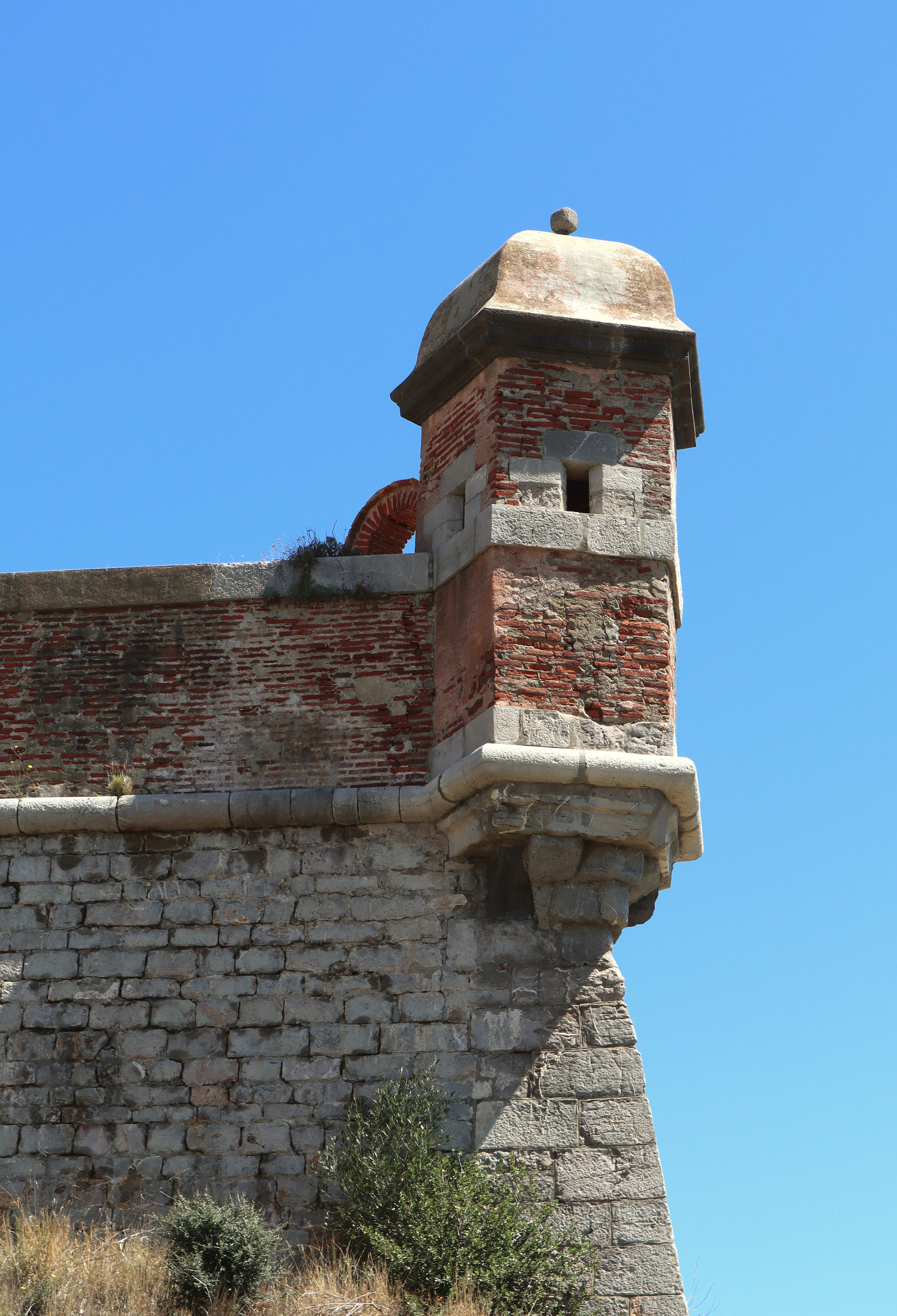
Bartizan of Fort del Fanal in Port-Vendres, Roussillon, France

=== On towers ===
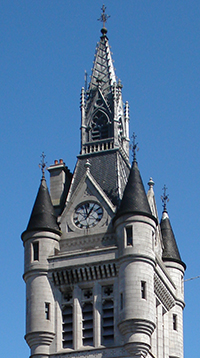
Bartizans on the West Tower of the new Town House in Aberdeen, Scotland, 1868–1874

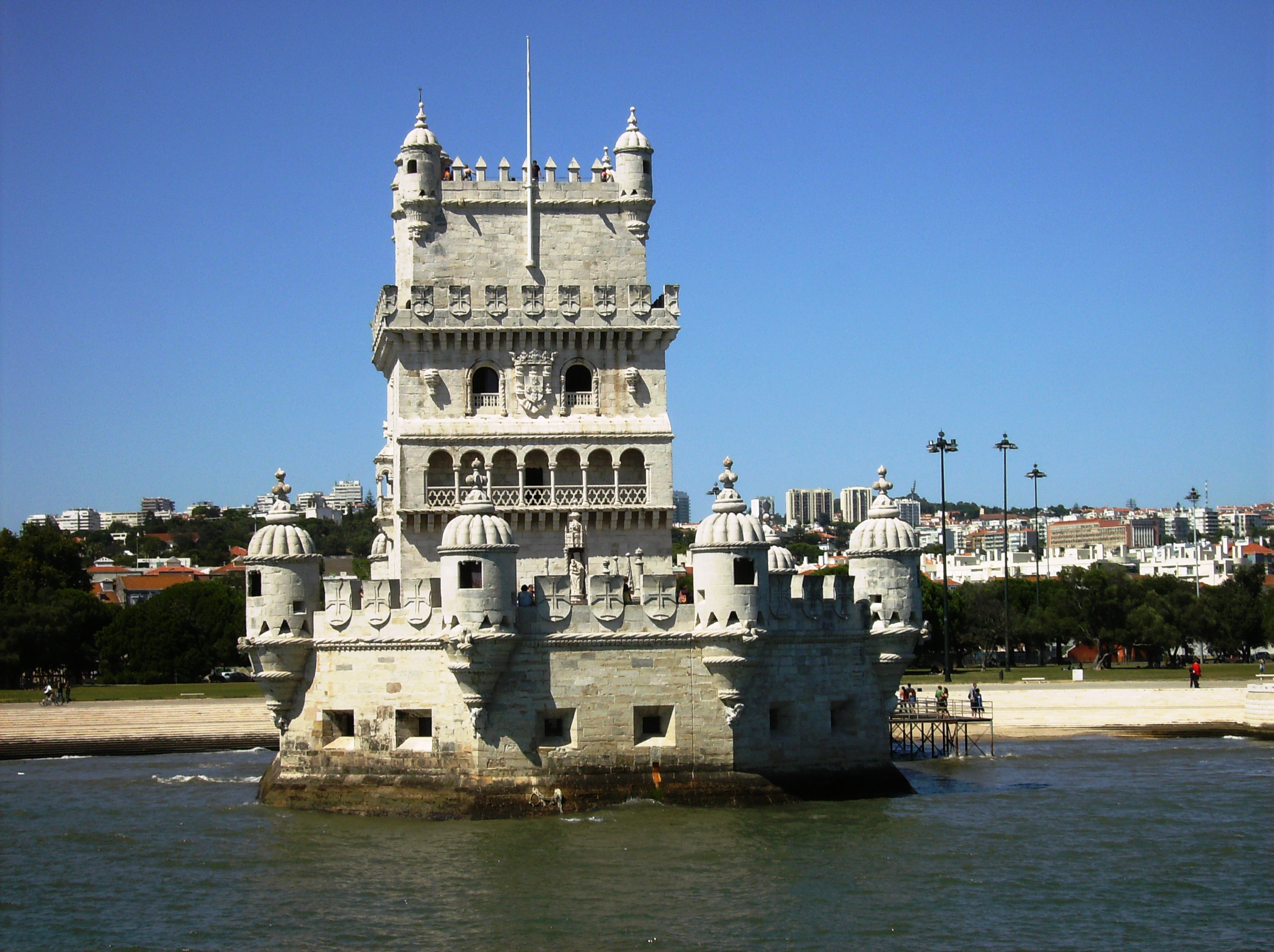
Manueline Guaritas at Belém Tower in Lisbon, Portugal

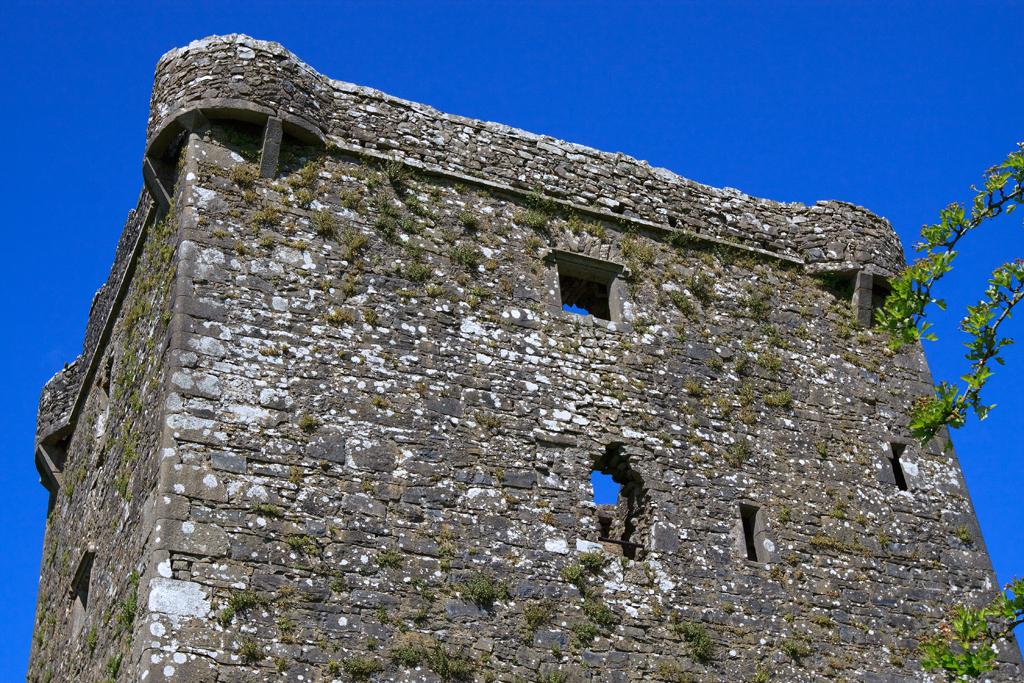
Bartizans at Feartagar Castle, Ireland

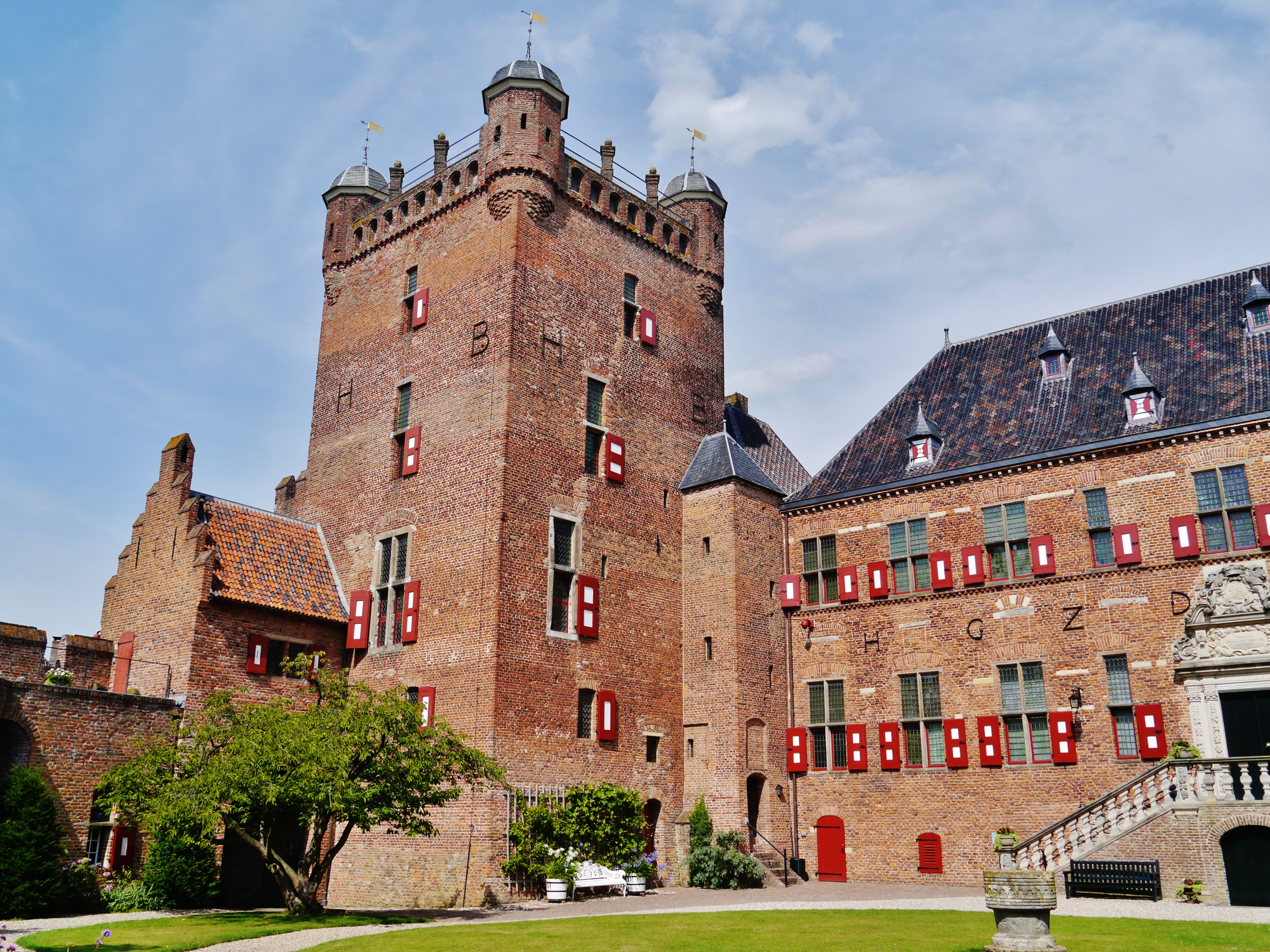
Courtyard of Bergh House, 's-Heerenberg, Netherlands

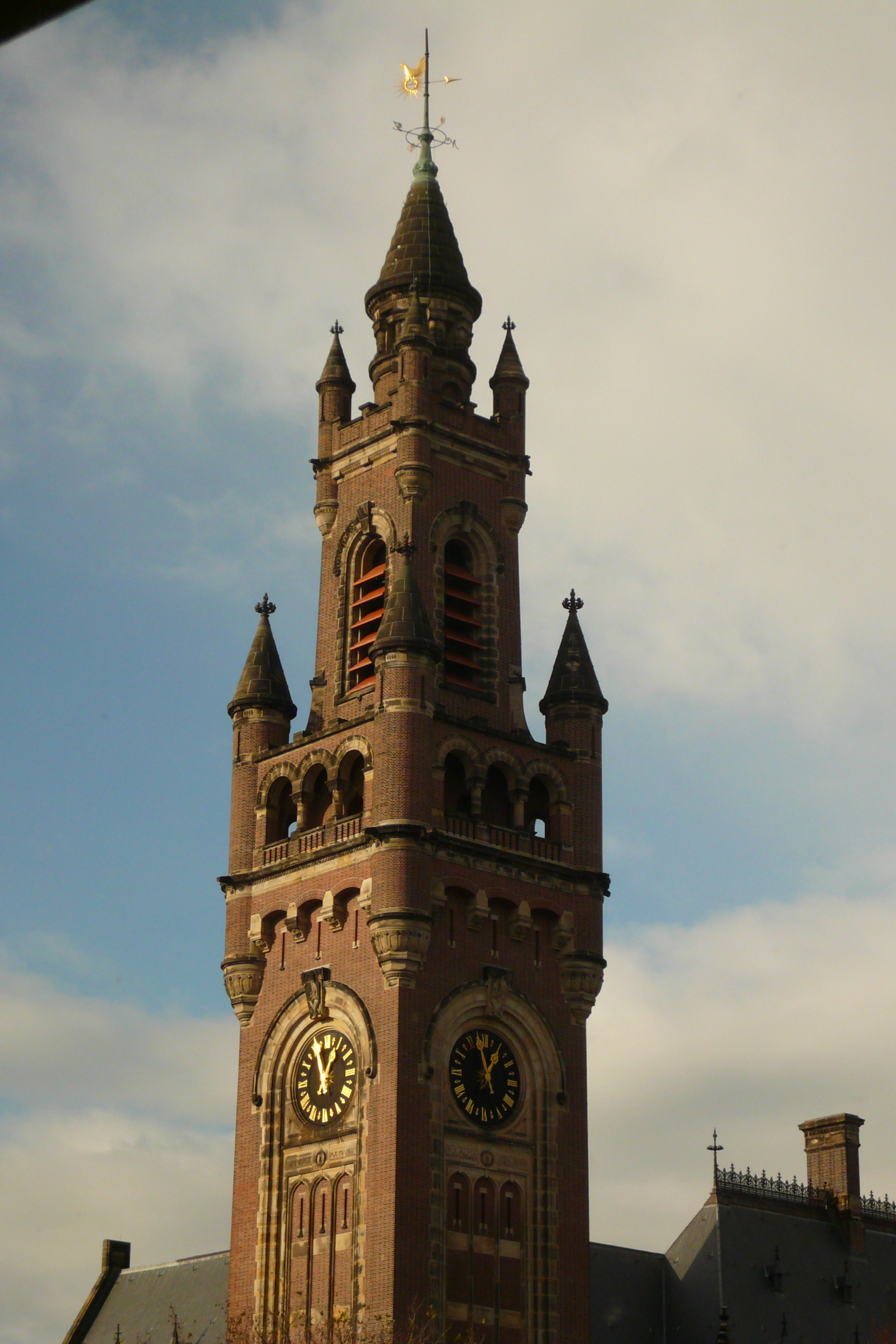
The Peace Palace bell tower, The Hague, Netherlands

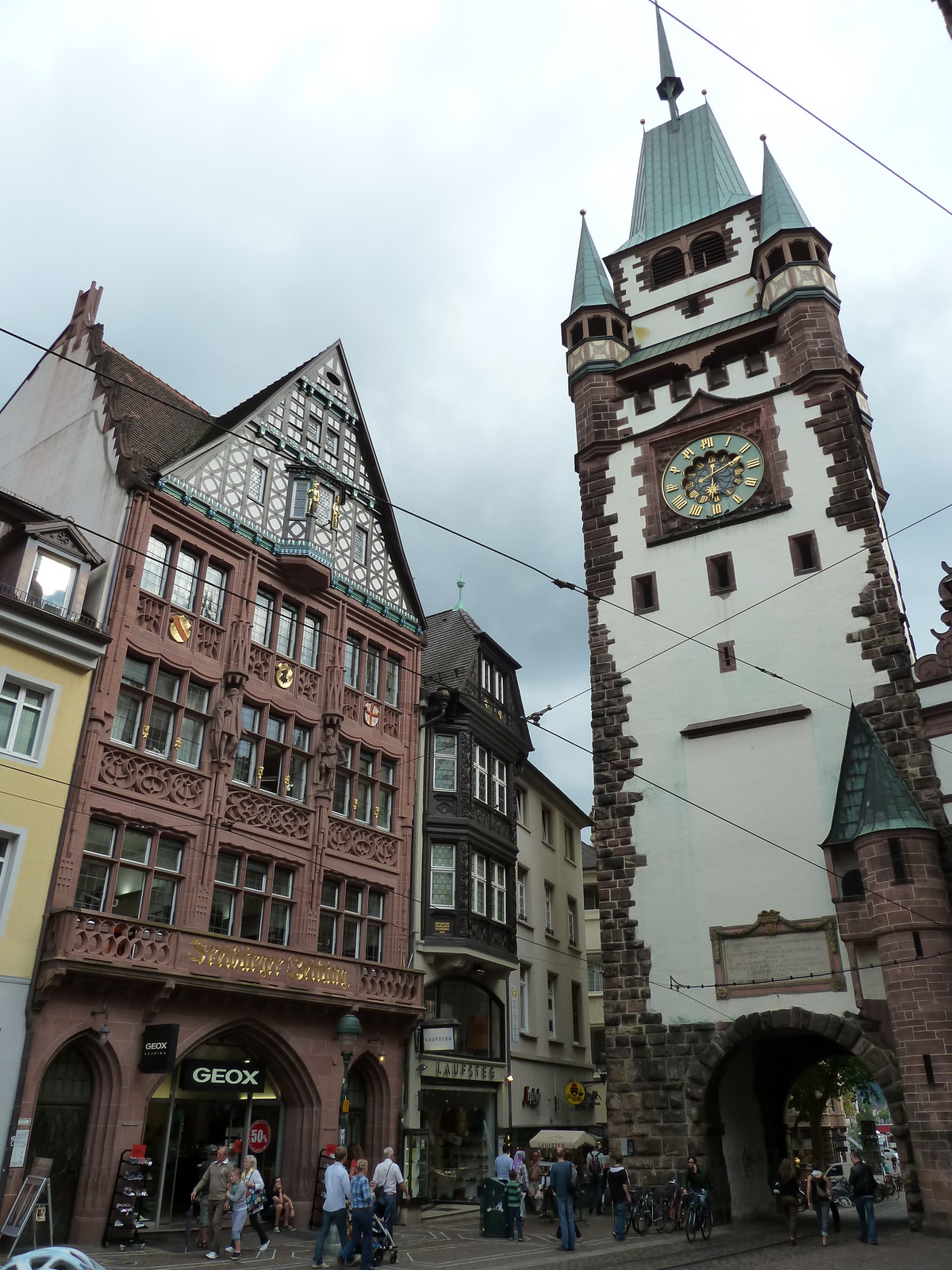
Martinstor, Freiburg, Germany

== See also ==
- Bretèche
- Garret—an attic or top floor room in the military sense; a watchtower from the French word garite
- Hoarding (castle)
