= River Dee (Ireland) =

River in eastern Ireland

Coordinates: 53°53′N 6°21′W

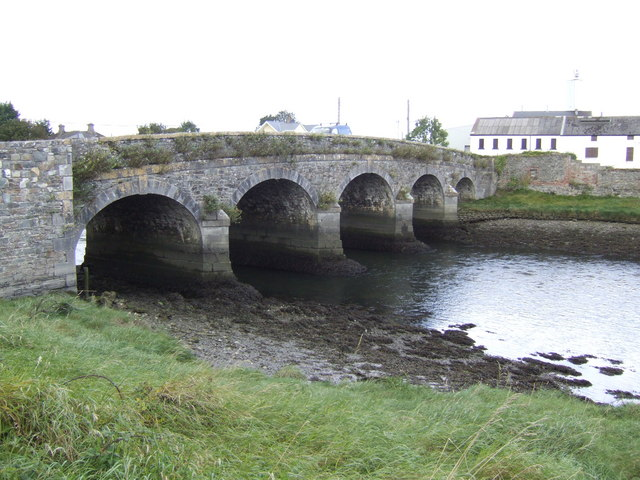
- Annagassan Bridge, where the R166 crosses the Dee
- Etymology: town of Ardee, ultimately níth, "combat" in Irish
- Native name: An Níth (Irish)

Location
- Country: Ireland
- Counties: Cavan, Meath, Louth
- Settlements: Nobber, Ardee, Annagassan

Physical characteristics
- Source
  - location: Teevurcher, County Meath
- Mouth
  - location: Irish Sea at Annagassan via Dundalk Bay
- Length: 60.4 km (37.5 mi)
- Basin size: 392 km^{2} (151 mi^{2})
- Discharge
  - average: 27.16 m^{3}/s (959 cu ft/s)

Basin features
- River system: River Glyde
- Tributaries
  - left: Killary River
  - right: Gara River, White River

The River Dee (Irish: An Níth) is a river in eastern Ireland, flowing from County Cavan to flow into the River Glyde near the coast, in County Louth.

== Legend ==
In the Táin Bó Cúailnge, Cúchulainn fights Ferdia at Ath Carpat ("chariot ford") on the river Níth. The river takes its name from the Irish níth, meaning "combat". The modern name Dee derives from the town of Ardee (Baile Átha Fhirdhia, "town of Ferdiad's ford").

== Course ==
The River Dee rises from a spring near Bailieboro in County Cavan and flows in an easterly direction for 37.75 miles (60.75 km) through County Meath and County Louth before joining with the River Glyde at the village of Annagassan. The Dee in turn has three main tributaries: the Killary River which joins south of Drumconrath (Drumcondra), County Meath, the Gara River which joins west of Ardee, County Louth, and the White River which flows north from Dunleer, County Louth. There is one lake on the Dee, Whitewood Lake, near Nobber, County Meath.

== Wildlife ==
The River Dee is a brown trout fishery.

== See also ==
- Rivers of Ireland
