= Annagassan =

Village in County Louth, Ireland

Annagassan Áth na gCasán
- Village
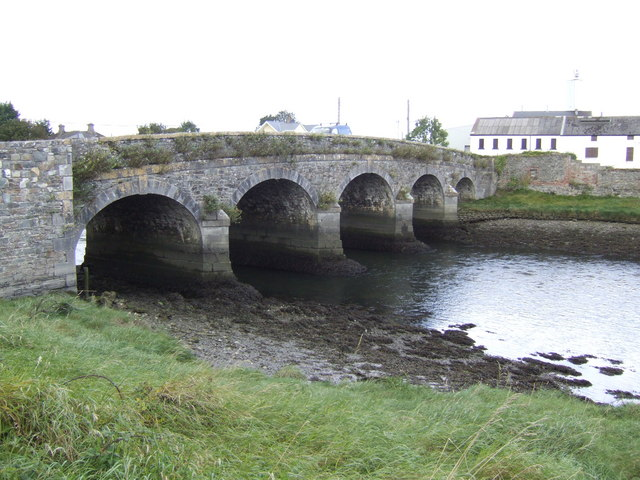
- Annagassan bridge

- Location in Ireland
- Coordinates: 53°53′N 6°21′W
- Country: Ireland
- Province: Leinster
- County: County Louth

Population (2022)
  - Total: 189

Annagassan (Irish: Áth na gCasán, meaning 'ford of the paths') is a village in the townland of Ballynagassan, County Louth, Ireland. It sits where the River Glyde enters the Irish Sea. It is approximately 13 km south of Dundalk and 18 km north of Drogheda. As of the 2022 census, Annagassan had a population of 189 people.

== History ==
Annagassan was first mentioned as Linn Duachaill in AD 841 when the establishment of a Viking longphort was recorded. It is unclear whether the longphort at Annagassan continued under the Dublin Viking regime after 852 since the location is not mentioned for seventy years. The longphort is estimated to have been 1.18 kilometres from north to south. Within this area, the earthwork of Lisnarann may have acted as the citadel. Thomas Wright was the first to record this area in 1748 and described it as a "Danish fort by the pass of the Llyns, upon the banks of the sea". The first material evidence of a Viking presence was a honestone discovered during a field survey of the site in a field near a laneway off Castlebellingham. In 2007, a geophysical survey was conducted that revealed a substantial anomaly spanning roughly 120 meters which likely extended the full 250 meters distance to the sea. The longphort itself was discovered in 2010 during a small research excavation.

In 827, the Annals of Ulster record that the Vikings attacked the Ciannachta people of Louth and north Meath. These early raids were sporadic coastal attacks by small seaborne forces; however, from the 830s, a new phase was characterised by larger fleets, which penetrated up navigable rivers and plundered extensive inland areas.

Annagassan was once as important as the Viking settlement at Dubh Linn (The Black Pool). The modern village is generally believed to be built on what some archaeologists consider to be a man-made polder structure, constructed to provide shelter for the fjord. The original settlement was located further upstream; navigation was considerably easier on the River Glyde in the 9th century before the intervening build-up of sediment.

== Community ==
Pubs in the area include the Glyde Inn, within the village, which was named 'National Irish Pub of the Year' in 2018.

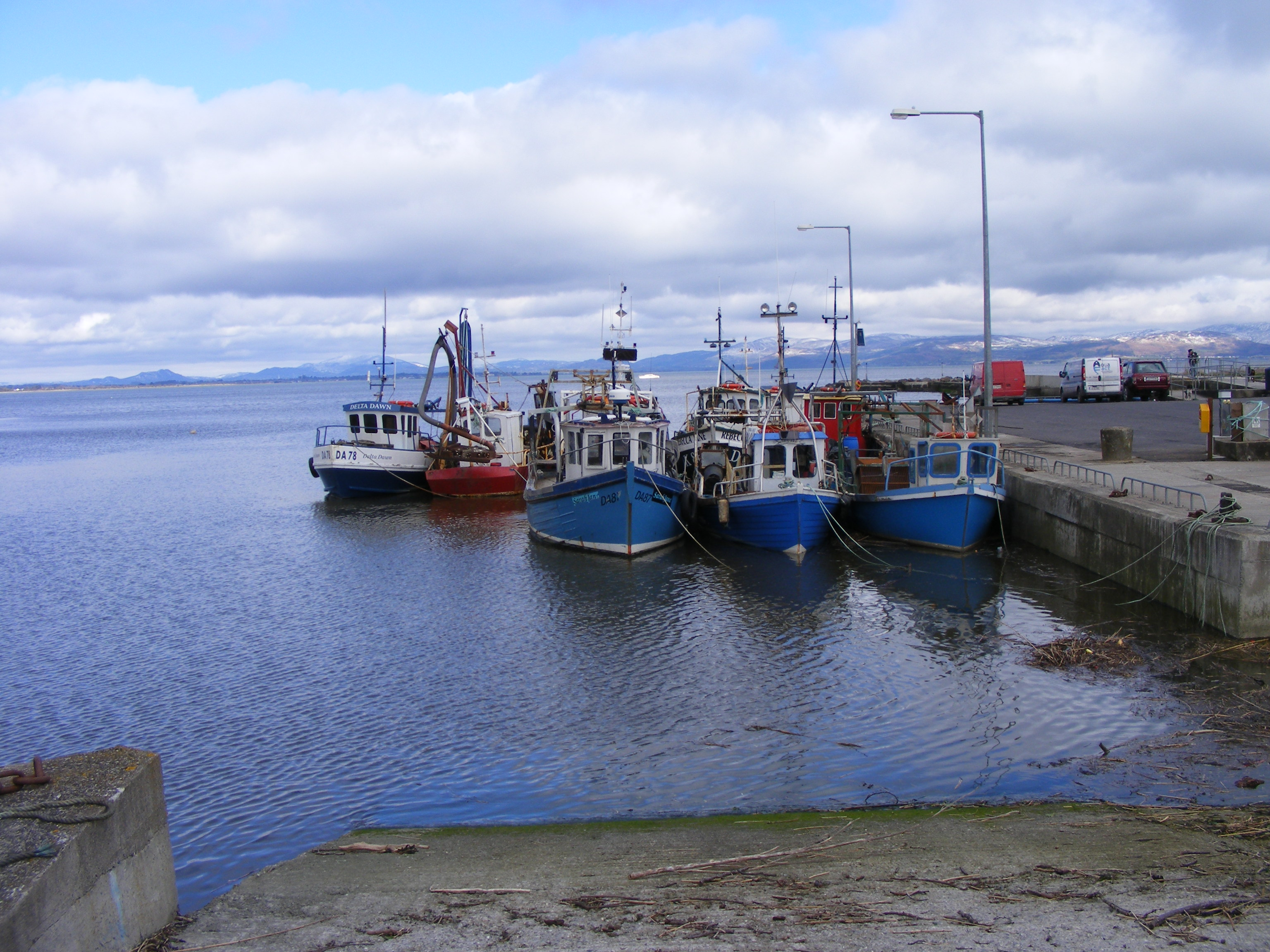
Boats in Annagassan's harbour

Annagassan is a fishing village, and the harbour still houses a number of fishing vessels that set out during the summer months for crab claws and other seafood. The main beach stretches the length of the coastline, beginning at the mouth of the River Glyde and stretching onto Salterstown beach.

From 2008 to 2013, Annagassan celebrated its Viking heritage with an annual "Viking Festival". The festival included demonstrations of sword fighting, dress up competitions, music, food and entertainment. It ended with a parade to the harbour in which a large wooden longboat was carried, and then burned in a bonfire. While the festival ended in 2014, due to insurance issues, the annual Viking 10k run still takes place. This race celebrated its 10th anniversary in 2022.

In sport, the local GAA club, Naomh Fionnbarra and St Anne's GFG, compete in Gaelic football competitions. The club fields children's, men's and women's teams and plays its home matches at John Markey Park in Annagassan.

The local school is St. Finian's of Dillonstown - sharing its name with the local church.

== Transport ==
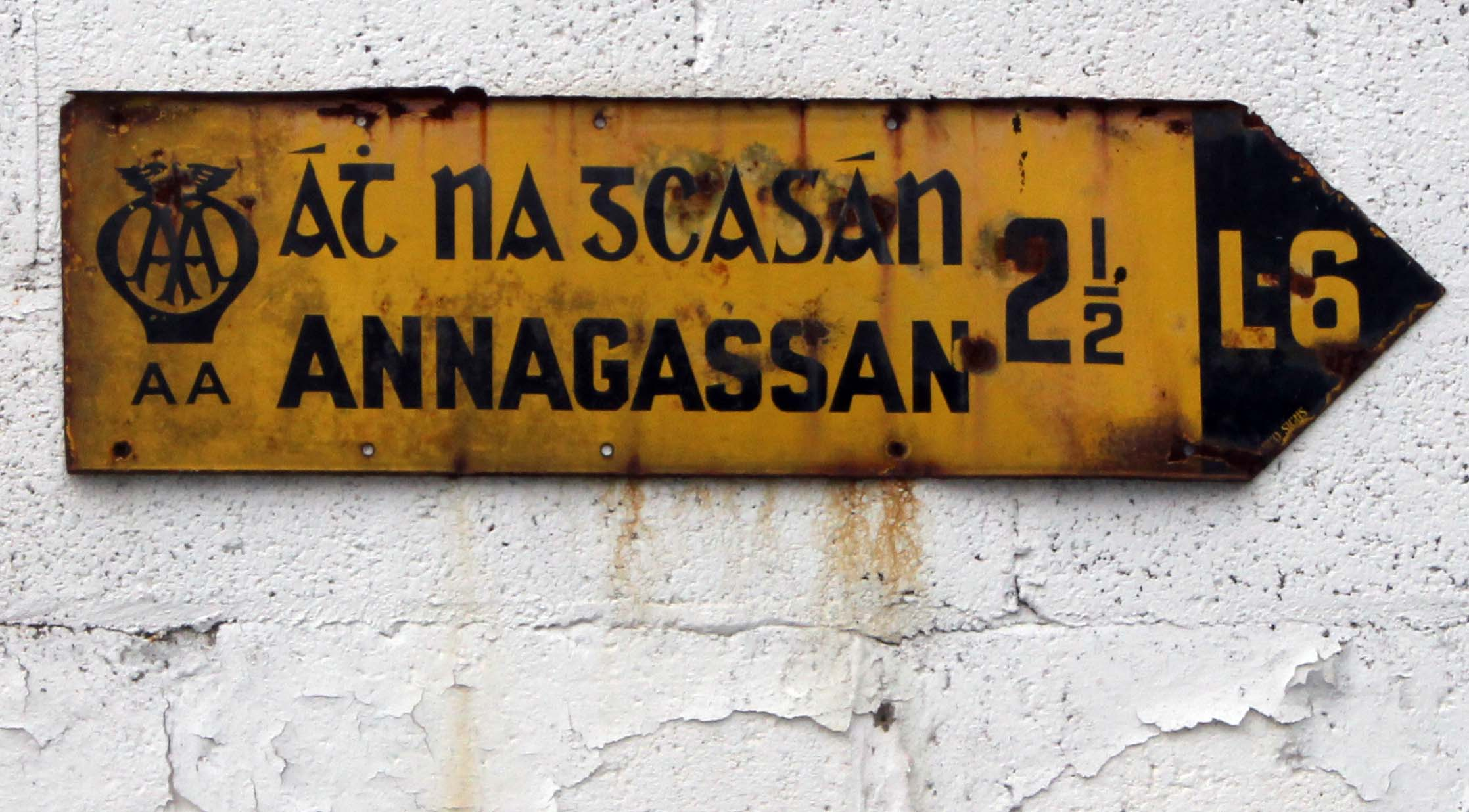
Old style bilingual AA fingerpost

Bus Éireann route 168 provides nine daily journeys to Dundalk, and nine daily journeys to Drogheda, on weekdays. The route also passes through Dromiskin, Castlebellingham, Clogherhead, Termonfeckin and Baltray.

== Notable people ==
- Noel Carroll (1941–1998), Olympic athlete at Tokyo 1964 and Mexico 1968, European and World record holder in 880 yard relay, bronze medal winner at 1969 European Indoor Championships, founder of the Dublin Marathon
- Mick Fairclough, former Republic of Ireland international, footballer for Huddersfield Town, Dundalk and Drogheda United
- C.S. Lewis (1898–1963), spent a number of summers in the Annagassan and Salterstown area

== See also ==
- List of towns and villages in Ireland
