= Longphort =

Irish term for a Viking shore fortress

A longphort (Ir. plur. longphuirt) is a term used in Ireland for a Viking ship enclosure or shore fortress. The longphorts were bases for Viking raids but had multiple purposes. The camps were fortified areas along rivers, usually at a tributary where both sides were protected such that the Vikings could port ships. The sites were easily defended, sheltered, and gave immediate access to the sea. The camps would be of great importance to the Vikings during their raids of Ireland, which included attacks on many churches and monasteries located on the coast. It can be assumed that the purpose of these sites was to ease travel and trade within the region. Longphorts were essential to the economic prosperity of the Vikings. For example, it is clear that the earliest settlements became major trading centers throughout Ireland. Archeological evidence shows that imports and exports included textiles, animal skins, amber, and glass from England. During this time, the Vikings were able to begin a period of extremely profitable trade. Overall, the longphort settlements were essential in establishing the presence of the Vikings in Ireland during the ninth and tenth centuries.

== Origins ==
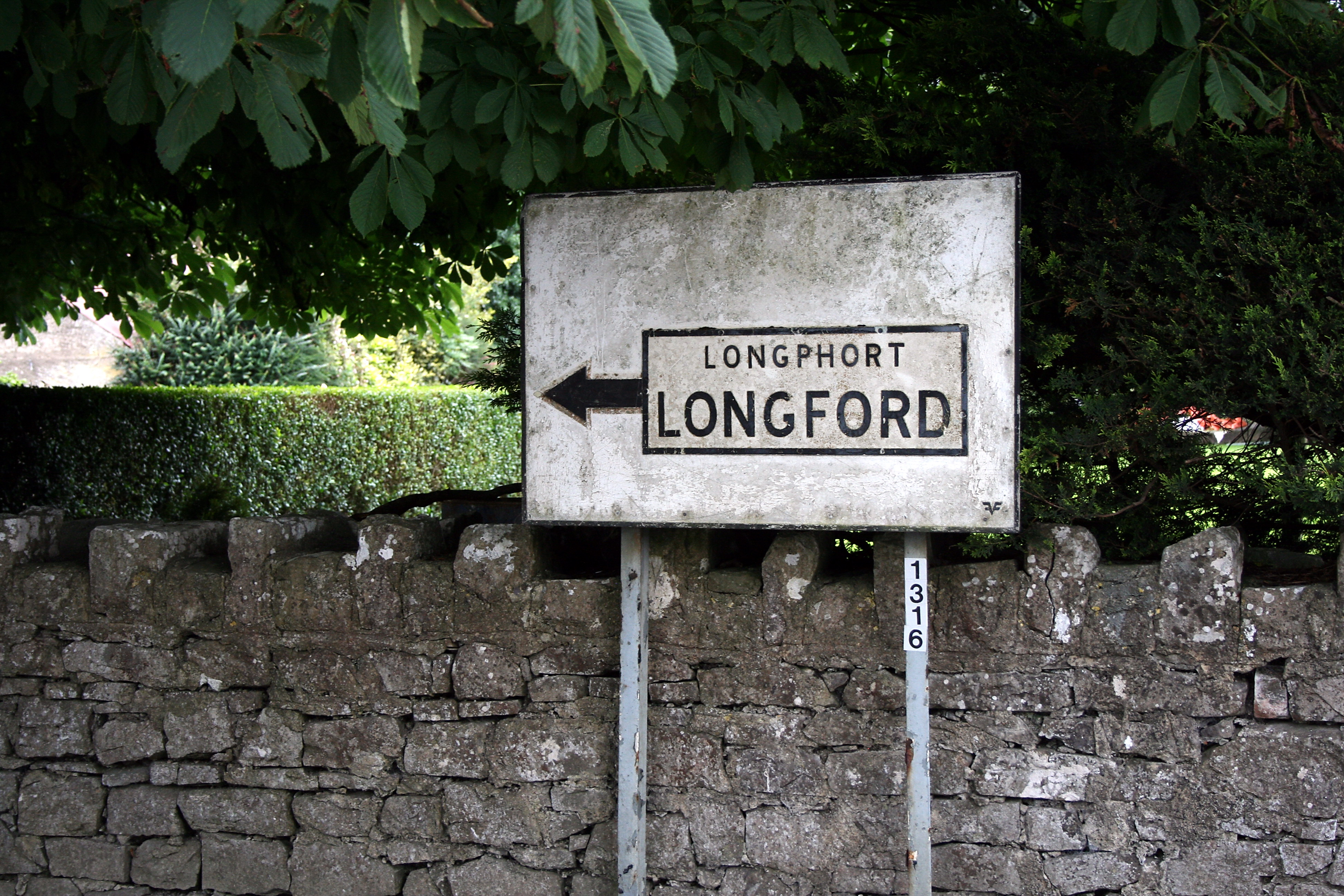
Sign pointing to the town of Longford, Irish Longphort, on the River Camlin, a tributary of the River Shannon.

The word was first used in the 840s in the Irish account of The Annals of Ulster and in the Frankish account in the Annals of St. Bertin with the establishment of Viking encampments at Linn Duachaill and Dublin. It also describes new Viking settlements established at Waterford in 914 and Limerick in 922 possibly by the Uí Ímair. Many camps along river banks and lakes did not last long, some only as little as one or two seasons. Others, however, including Dublin, Cork, Waterford, Woodstown (in Waterford), Wexford, and Limerick, became the largest towns in Ireland.

== Terminology ==
The term longphort, or longphuit in Irish as seen in the annals, literally translates to “ship camp”. This compound word was likely coined by Irish monks from the Latin word "longus" (long) reflecting the Old Norse "lang" (long), thus implying "langskip" (long ship); plus the Latin "portus", meaning port, harbour. There are several towns and townlands in Ireland whose names bear some element of Longphort in them. This may suggest that at some point in history there may have been a longphort situated there, as is attested in some examples.

The town and county of Longford are anglicisations of the Irish equivalent "longfort", referring to a fortress or fortified house. The County Kerry village of Ballylongford and Scottish village of Longformacus also derive their names from longfort.
