= River Glyde =

River in eastern Ireland

Coordinates: 53°53′N 6°21′W

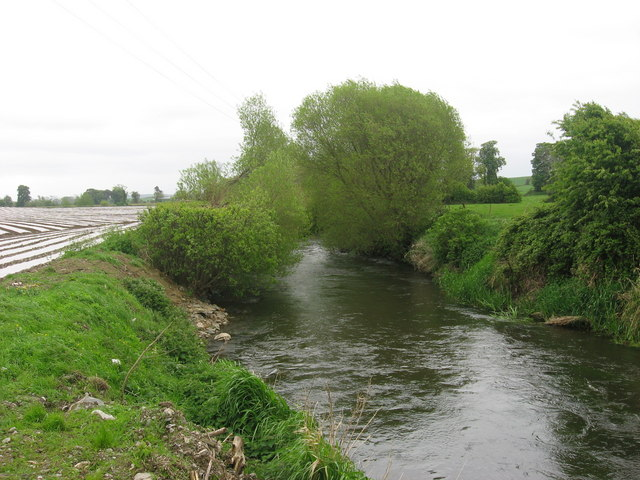
- River Glyde at Glydefarm
- Etymology: for its "gliding" through an extensive flat country
- Native name: An Casán (Irish)

Location
- Country: Ireland
- County: Cavan and Louth

Physical characteristics
- Source
  - location: Bailieborough
- Mouth
  - location: Irish Sea at Annagassan via River Dee
- Length: 55.9 km (34.7 mi)
- Basin size: 348 km^{2} (134 sq mi)

The River Glyde (Irish: an Casán) is a river in eastern Ireland, flowing from County Cavan to County Louth.

== Course ==
The Glyde rises in the town of Bailieborough in Cavan, the upper reaches are sometimes known as the Lagan River, but after the Killanny River joins, exclusively as the Glyde. Another tributary is the River Dee. The Glyde flows in a south-easterly direction before entering the sea at Annagassan in Louth, site of the recently rediscovered ninth-century Viking longphort Linn Duachaill.

The river is 34.75 miles (55.92 km) long.

== Leisure ==
The salmon and sea trout season here is from 1 February – 20 August. The Killanny River contain stocks of sea trout and salmon.

The Glyde Rangers Gaelic Athletic Association team, founded in 1926, from Tallanstown in County Louth is named after the River Glyde.
