= Urban areas in the Republic of Ireland =

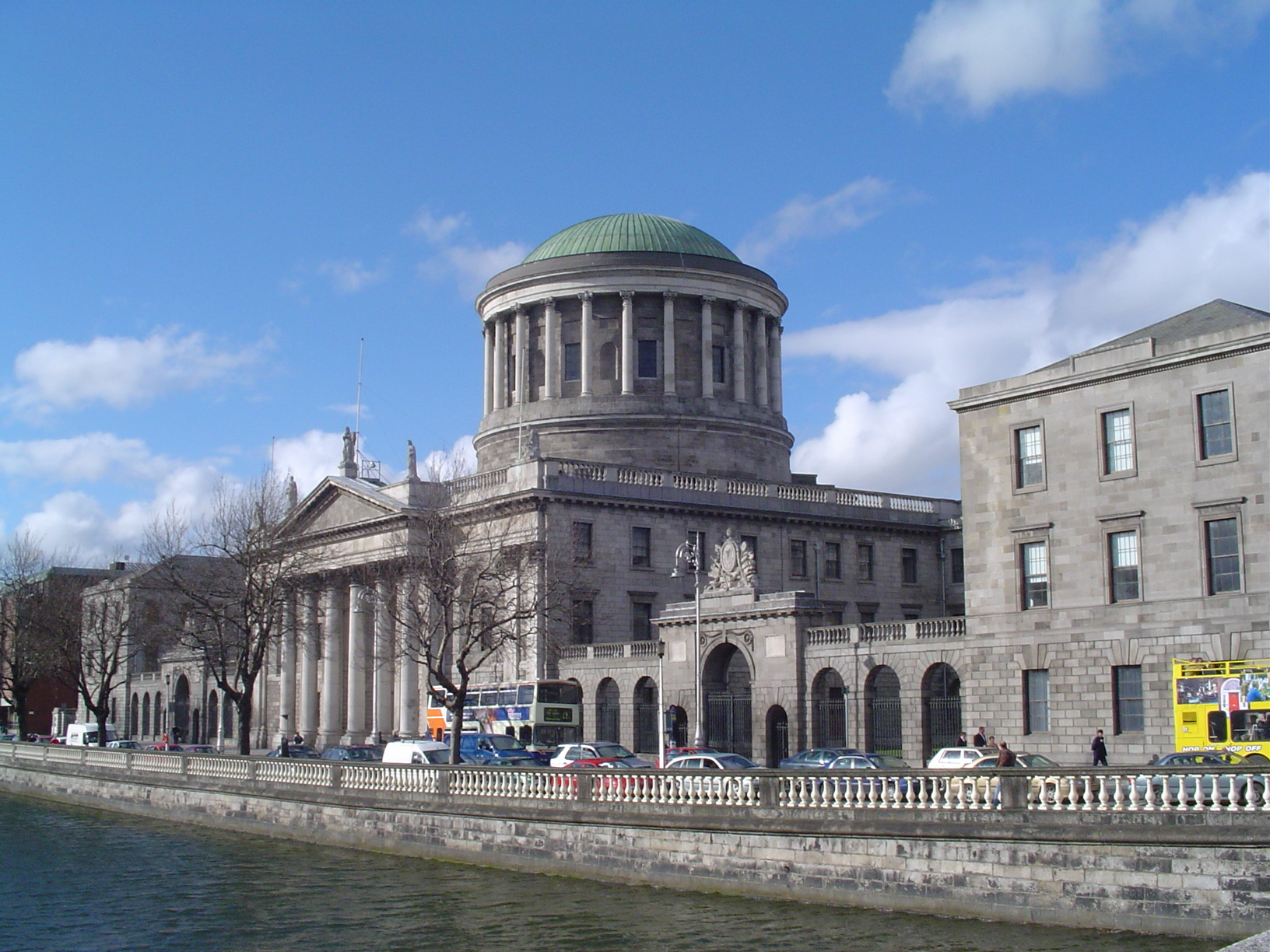
Dublin, the capital of Ireland

This is a list of urban areas in the Republic of Ireland by population. In 2022, the Central Statistics Office (CSO), the Department of Housing, Local Government and Heritage and Tailte Éireann created of a new unit of urban geography called Built Up Areas (BUAs) which were used to produce data for urban areas in the 2022 census of Ireland.

There were 867 BUAs, representing the entire settlement area of each town and city (including suburbs and environs). The 250 largest cities, towns and villages are listed below with data from the 2022 census.

== Cities and towns list ==
Rank 2022	Change since 2016	Urban area	County	Population 2022	Increase since 2016
1	0	Dublin city and suburbs	County Dublin & County Meath	1,263,219	7.7%
2	0	Cork city and suburbs	County Cork	222,526	6.6%
3	0	Limerick city and suburbs	County Limerick & County Clare	102,287	8.6%
4	0	Galway city and suburbs	County Galway	85,910	7.5%
5	0	Waterford city and suburbs	County Waterford & County Kilkenny	60,079	12.3%
6	0	Drogheda	County Louth & County Meath	44,135	7.8%
7	▲1	Dundalk	County Louth	43,112	10.5%
8	▼1	Swords	County Dublin	40,776	3.9%
9	▲1	Navan	County Meath	33,886	12.3%
10	▼1	Bray	County Wicklow & County Dublin	33,512	2.8%
11	▲1	Ennis	County Clare	27,923	10.5%
12	▲1	Carlow	County Carlow & County Laois	27,351	12.7%
13	▼2	Kilkenny	County Kilkenny	27,184	2.5%
14	▲4	Naas	County Kildare	26,180	22.4%
15	▼1	Tralee	County Kerry	26,079	10.1%
16	▼1	Newbridge	County Kildare	24,366	7.1%
17	0	Balbriggan	County Dublin	24,322	12.0%
18	▼2	Portlaoise	County Laois	23,494	6.5%
19	0	Athlone	County Westmeath & County Roscommon	22,869	7.1%
20	0	Mullingar	County Westmeath	22,667	8.3%
21	▲2	Letterkenny	County Donegal	22,549	17.0%
22	▲3	Greystones	County Wicklow	22,009	21.3%
23	▼1	Wexford	County Wexford	21,524	6.6%
24	0	Sligo	County Sligo	20,608	7.3%
25	▼4	Celbridge	County Kildare	20,601	3.8%
26	▲1	Malahide	County Dublin	18,608	12.4%
27	▼1	Clonmel	County Tipperary & County Waterford	18,369	7.2%
28	0	Carrigaline	County Cork	18,239	15.7%
29	▲2	Maynooth	County Kildare	17,259	18.3%
30	▼1	Leixlip	County Kildare	16,733	7.9%
31	▲4	Ashbourne	County Meath	15,680	23.7%
32	▲7	Laytown–Bettystown–Mornington–Donacarney	County Meath	15,642	31.8%
33	▼3	Tullamore	County Offaly	15,598	6.8%
34	▼2	Killarney	County Kerry	14,412	−0.6%
35	▼1	Cobh	County Cork	14,148	10.5%
36	0	Midleton	County Cork	13,906	11.3%
37	0	Mallow	County Cork	13,456	8.0%
38	▼5	Arklow	County Wicklow	13,399	1.8%
39	▼1	Castlebar	County Mayo	13,054	8.2%
40	▲2	Wicklow	County Wicklow	12,957	22.4%
41	▼1	Enniscorthy	County Wexford	12,310	8.2%
42	▼1	Cavan	County Cavan	11,741	7.6%
43	▲5	Gorey	County Wexford	11,517	17.3%
44	▼1	Tramore	County Waterford	11,277	8.6%
45	▲5	Athy	County Kildare	11,035	14.0%
46	0	Longford	County Longford	10,952	9.4%
47	0	Rush	County Dublin	10,875	9.4%
48	▲4	Portmarnock	County Dublin	10,750	13.6%
49	▼4	Skerries	County Dublin	10,743	7.0%
50	▼6	Ballina	County Mayo	10,556	3.8%
51	▲6	Kildare	County Kildare	10,302	19.3%
52	▼3	Shannon	County Clare	10,256	5.4%
53	0	Dungarvan	County Waterford	10,081	9.3%
54	▼3	Ratoath	County Meath	10,077	5.7%
55	0	Nenagh	County Tipperary	9,895	10.3%
56	▲8	Donabate	County Dublin	9,669	29.9%
57	▼1	Tuam	County Galway	9,647	10.0%
58	▼4	Trim	County Meath	9,563	4.0%
59	▼1	Portarlington	County Laois & County Offaly	9,288	11.0%
60	▲2	Lusk	County Dublin	8,806	13.1%
61	▲15	Kilcock	County Kildare	8,674	42.4%
62	▼3	New Ross	County Wexford	8,610	7.1%
63	▼3	Youghal	County Cork	8,564	7.5%
64	▲4	Bandon	County Cork	8,196	17.8%
65	▼4	Thurles	County Tipperary	8,185	3.1%
66	0	Clane	County Kildare	8,152	12.0%
67	▼4	Monaghan	County Monaghan	7,894	2.8%
68	▼3	Edenderry	County Offaly	7,888	7.2%
69	▲2	Kinsealy–Drinan	County Dublin	7,526	13.3%
70	▲2	Newcastle West	County Limerick	7,209	8.9%
71	▼4	Dunboyne	County Meath	7,155	−1.6%
72	▼3	Buncrana	County Donegal	6,971	2.7%
73	▲1	Westport	County Mayo	6,872	10.9%
74	▼1	Fermoy	County Cork	6,720	2.1%
75	▲28	Dunshaughlin	County Meath	6,644	64.7%
76	▼1	Kells	County Meath	6,608	7.7%
77	▼7	Ballinasloe	County Galway & County Roscommon	6,597	−1.0%
78	▼1	Roscommon	County Roscommon	6,555	11.6%
79	▲2	Loughrea	County Galway	6,322	13.8%
80	▼2	Sallins	County Kildare	6,269	7.2%
81	▼1	Passage West	County Cork	6,051	3.6%
82	▲2	Kinsale	County Cork	5,991	13.4%
83	▲4	Oranmore	County Galway	5,819	16.6%
84	▲14	Rathcoole	County Dublin	5,792	33.1%
85	▼5	Carrick-on-Suir	County Tipperary & County Waterford	5,752	−0.3%
86	0	Carrickmacross	County Monaghan	5,745	14.2%
87	▼5	Blessington	County Wicklow	5,611	1.6%
88	▼2	Carrigtwohill	County Cork	5,568	9.6%
89	▼6	Roscrea	County Tipperary	5,542	1.8%
90	▼1	Ardee	County Louth	5,478	11.2%
91	▼1	Ballybofey–Stranorlar	County Donegal	5,406	11.4%
92	▼4	Tipperary	County Tipperary	5,387	8.2%
93	▲6	Monasterevin	County Kildare	5,307	25.0%
94	▼1	Tullow	County Carlow	5,138	10.0%
95	▼1	Clonakilty	County Cork	5,112	11.3%
96	▼4	Mountmellick	County Laois	4,905	2.7%
97	▲4	Duleek	County Meath	4,899	16.1%
98	▼2	Cashel	County Tipperary	4,805	8.7%
99	▼8	Listowel	County Kerry	4,794	−0.5%
100	▲2	Carrick-on-Shannon	County Leitrim & County Roscommon	4,743	16.8%
101	▼4	Birr	County Offaly	4,726	8.1%
102	▼7	Athenry	County Galway	4,603	3.6%
103	▲15	Saggart	County Dublin	4,573	46.0%
104	▼4	Kilcoole	County Wicklow	4,569	7.8%
105	▲14	Newcastle	County Dublin	4,526	46.3%
106	▲5	Courtown (Note: Listed as Courtown Harbour-Riverchapel-Ardamine in the 2016 census.)	County Wexford	4,365	21.6%
107	▼2	Macroom	County Cork	4,096	8.8%
108	▼4	Charleville	County Cork	3,970	1.3%
109	0	Castleblayney	County Monaghan	3,926	8.8%
110	▼2	Claremorris	County Mayo	3,857	4.6%
111	▲4	Kill	County Kildare	3,818	14.0%
112	▼5	Kilcullen	County Kildare	3,815	2.8%
113	▼7	Mitchelstown	County Cork	3,744	0.1%
114	0	Stamullen	County Meath	3,720	10.7%
115	▼5	Cahir	County Tipperary	3,679	2.4%
116	▲1	Enfield	County Meath	3,663	13.1%
117	▲6	Newtownmountkennedy	County Wicklow	3,539	24.8%
118	▼5	Rathnew	County Wicklow	3,482	3.3%
119	▼3	Clara	County Offaly	3,403	2.0%
120	▲1	Annacotty	County Limerick	3,398	16.0%
121	▼9	Tower	County Cork	3,300	-3.5%
122	▲14	Rathangan	County Kildare	3,263	25.0%
123	▲14	Crosshaven	County Cork	3,263	26.6%
124	▲8	Virginia	County Cavan	3,211	21.3%
125	▼1	Ballinrobe	County Mayo	3,148	13.0%
126	▲1	Kinnegad	County Westmeath	3,064	11.6%
127	▼1	Moate	County Westmeath	3,013	9.0%
128	▲2	Bailieborough	County Cavan	2,974	10.8%
129	▲4	Ballina	County Tipperary	2,959	12.4%
130	▲10	Kingscourt	County Cavan	2,955	18.2%
131	▼9	Bagenalstown	County Carlow	2,945	3.8%
132	▼4	Bantry	County Cork	2,929	7.6%
133	▼2	Ballyjamesduff	County Cavan	2,917	9.6%
134	▲4	Boyle	County Roscommon	2,915	13.5%
135	▼10	Skibbereen	County Cork	2,903	4.5%
136	▼16	Gort	County Galway	2,870	-4.1%
137	▼3	Sixmilebridge	County Clare	2,832	7.9%
138	▲10	Kanturk	County Cork	2,803	19.3%
139	0	Blarney	County Cork	2,779	9.5%
140	▲7	Ballyhaunis	County Mayo	2,773	17.2%
141	▲2	Carndonagh	County Donegal	2,768	12.0%
142	▼7	Donegal	County Donegal	2,749	5.0%
143	▼1	Callan	County Kilkenny	2,678	8.2%
144	▼15	Kilrush	County Clare	2,649	-2.6%
145	▲8	Baltinglass	County Wicklow	2,611	22.2%
146	▲18	Bundoran	County Donegal	2,599	32.4%
147	▼3	Athboy	County Meath	2,596	6.2%
148	▼2	Kenmare	County Kerry	2,566	8.0%
149	▼8	Castleisland	County Kerry	2,536	1.1%
150	▲4	Castleconnell	County Limerick	2,488	18.1%
151	▼2	Prosperous	County Kildare	2,413	3.4%
152	▲20	Ballaghaderreen	County Roscommon	2,387	32.0%
153	▲8	Castlerea	County Roscommon	2,348	17.9%
154	▲5	Bearna	County Galway	2,336	16.9%
155	▲7	Tubbercurry	County Sligo	2,307	16.2%
156	▼11	Thomastown	County Kilkenny	2,305	-5.7%
157	▲1	Balrothery	County Dublin	2,282	13.1%
158	▲28	Moycullen (Note: Listed as Maigh Cuilinn in the 2016 and 2022 census.)	County Galway	2,279	33.7%
159	▼7	Clogherhead	County Louth	2,275	6.1%
160	▲25	Rathdrum	County Wicklow	2,264	36.1%
161	▲80	Rosslare Harbour (Note: Listed as Ballygeary (Rosslare Harbour) in the 2016 census.)	County Wexford	2,247	87.3%
162	▼12	Ballyshannon	County Donegal	2,246	-2.3%
163	▼6	Abbeyfeale	County Limerick	2,206	9.0%
164	▼9	Edgeworthstown (Note: Listed as Meathas Truim (Edgeworthstown) in the 2016 census.)	County Longford	2,199	6.1%
165	▼5	Newport	County Tipperary	2,183	9.4%
166	▼15	Killorglin	County Kerry	2,163	-1.6%
167	▲3	Dunleer	County Louth	2,143	17.6%
168	▲8	Mountrath	County Laois	2,070	16.7%
169	▼6	Bunclody (Note: Listed as Bunclody-Carrickduff in the 2016 census.)	County Wexford & County Carlow	2,053	3.5%
170	▼5	Templemore	County Tipperary	2,005	3.4%
171	▼5	Enniskerry	County Wicklow	2,000	5.9%
172	▲22	Termonfeckin	County Louth	1,983	25.6%
173	▲7	Strandhill	County Sligo	1,982	13.1%
174	0	Cloyne	County Cork	1,967	9.1%
175	▲11	Dunmanway	County Cork	1,964	18.7%
176	▲2	Rathcormac	County Cork	1,957	11.1%
177	▲2	Banagher	County Offaly	1,907	8.4%
178	▼1	Abbeyleix	County Laois	1,897	7.2%
179	▲35	Ashford	County Wicklow	1,892	32.8%
180	▼5	Newmarket-on-Fergus	County Clare	1,887	5.8%
181	▲2	Clones	County Monaghan	1,885	12.2%
182	▼1	Portlaw	County Waterford	1,881	8.0%
183	▼12	Ballivor	County Meath	1,870	3.4%
184	▼16	Cootehill	County Cavan	1,856	0.2%
185	▼16	Castlebridge	County Wexford	1,850	0.5%
186	▲43	Oughterard	County Galway	1,846	40.1%
187	▲41	Watergrasshill	County Cork	1,840	36.7%
188	▲2	Derrinturn	County Kildare	1,837	14.7%
189	0	Collooney	County Sligo	1,797	11.6%
190	▼2	Rosslare Strand (Note: Listed as Rosslare in the 2016 census.)	County Wexford	1,795	10.8%
191	▼7	Kilmallock	County Limerick	1,761	5.6%
192	▲33	Ballysadare (Note: Listed as Ballisodare in the 2016 census.)	County Sligo	1,747	29.4%
193	▲5	Fethard	County Tipperary	1,738	12.5%
194	▲15	Lanesborough–Ballyleague	County Roscommon & County Longford	1,733	19.2%
195	▼22	Dunmore East	County Waterford	1,731	-4.3%
196	▼1	Millstreet	County Cork	1,722	10.7%
197	▼30	Ballymahon	County Longford	1,714	-8.7%
198	▼2	Ballymote	County Sligo	1,711	10.5%
199	0	Convoy	County Donegal	1,702	11.5%
200	▼3	Tullyallen	County Louth	1,697	9.7%
201	▲9	Portumna	County Galway	1,690	16.6%
202=	▲3	Castledermot	County Kildare	1,685	14.2%
202=	▲78	Allenwood	County Kildare	1,685	71.8%
202=	▼9	Longwood	County Meath	1,685	6.6%
205	▼49	Dingle (Note: Listed as An Daingean in the 2016 census and as Dingle-Daingean Uí Chuis in the 2022 census.)	County Kerry	1,671	-18.5%
206	▲2	Manorhamilton	County Leitrim	1,667	13.7%
207	▼5	Killaloe	County Clare	1,666	12.3%
208	▲19	Mullagh	County Cavan	1,651	22.5%
209	▲26	Claregalway (Note: Listed as Baile Chláir in the 2016 and 2022 census.)	County Galway	1,632	30.8%
210	▲6	Ballybunion	County Kerry	1,618	14.5%
211	▼24	Lifford	County Donegal	1,613	-0.8%
212	▲11	Belturbet	County Cavan	1,610	17.6%
213	▼22	Castlemartyr	County Cork	1,603	0.2%
214	▲17	Kilbeggan	County Westmeath	1,575	22.3%
215	▲7	Killucan and Rathwire	County Westmeath	1,574	14.9%
216	▼12	Caherconlish	County Limerick	1,569	6.3%
217	▼6	Carlingford	County Louth	1,528	5.7%
218	▼12	Graiguenamanagh–Tinnahinch	County Kilkenny & County Carlow	1,506	2.1%
219	▼12	Rochfortbridge	County Westmeath	1,498	1.7%
220	▼20	Castlecomer (Note: Listed as Castlecomer-Donaguile in the 2016 census.)	County Kilkenny	1,496	-4.6%
221	▲129	Coill Dubh (Note: Listed as Coill Dubh (Blackwood) in the 2016 and 2022 census.)	County Kildare	1,476	97.9%
222	▲32	Killumney	County Cork	1,466	29.5%
223	▼6	Swinford	County Mayo	1,459	4.7%
224	▲6	Foxford	County Mayo	1,452	10.4%
225	▼1	Slane	County Meath	1,445	5.6%
226	▼14	Aughrim	County Wicklow	1,437	-0.3%
227	▼7	Murroe	County Limerick	1,432	4.0%
228	▲29	Ballyconnell	County Cavan	1,422	28.7%
229	▲10	Muff	County Donegal	1,418	15.7%
230	▼11	Oldcastle	County Meath	1,409	1.9%
231	▼5	Stradbally	County Laois	1,404	4.0%
232	▼29	Moville	County Donegal	1,390	-6.1%
233	▲16	Ballinroad	County Waterford	1,389	19.6%
234	▼2	Rathdowney	County Laois	1,368	7.6%
235	▲13	Castlepollard	County Westmeath	1,349	16.0%
236	▼15	Lismore	County Waterford	1,347	-2.0%
237	▼1	Ballybay	County Monaghan	1,329	7.1%
238	▲5	Ferbane	County Offaly	1,324	11.2%
239	▲38	Johnstown	County Kildare	1,320	31.3%
240	▼25	Ferns	County Wexford	1,317	-6.9%
241	▲29	Cahirciveen	County Kerry	1,297	24.6%
242	0	Dromiskin	County Louth	1,292	8.1%
243	▲8	Enniscrone (Note: Listed as Inniscrone in the 2016 census.)	County Sligo	1,291	11.7%
244	▼11	Ramelton	County Donegal	1,288	1.7%
245	▼5	Piltown	County Kilkenny	1,275	4.5%
246	▲73	Greencastle	County Donegal	1,268	52.6%
247	▼9	Portrane	County Dublin	1,262	2.1%
248	▼56	Clifden	County Galway	1,259	-21.2%
249	▼12	Killybegs	County Donegal	1,258	1.8%
250	▼17	Kilpedder	County Wicklow	1,248	0.6%

== Notes ==
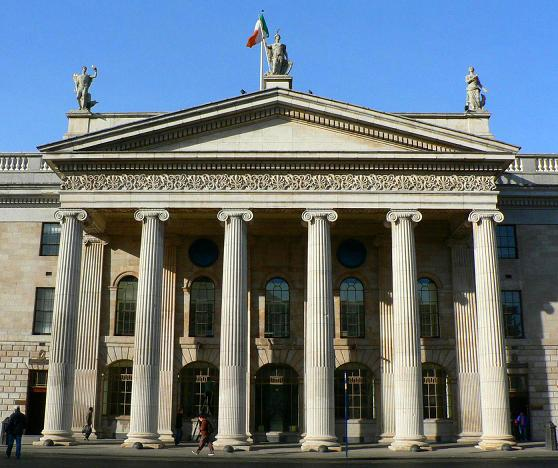
1st, Dublin

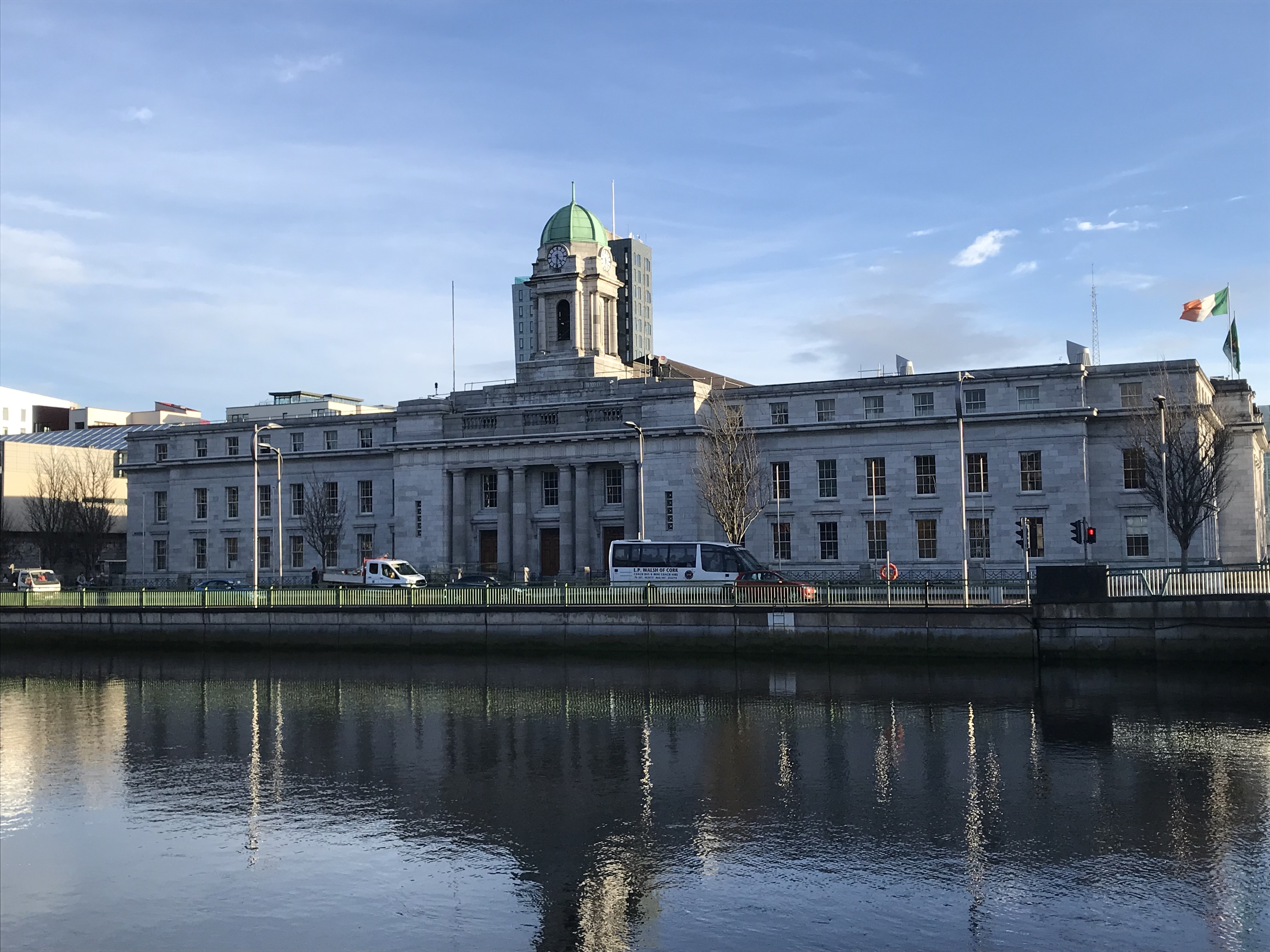
2nd, Cork

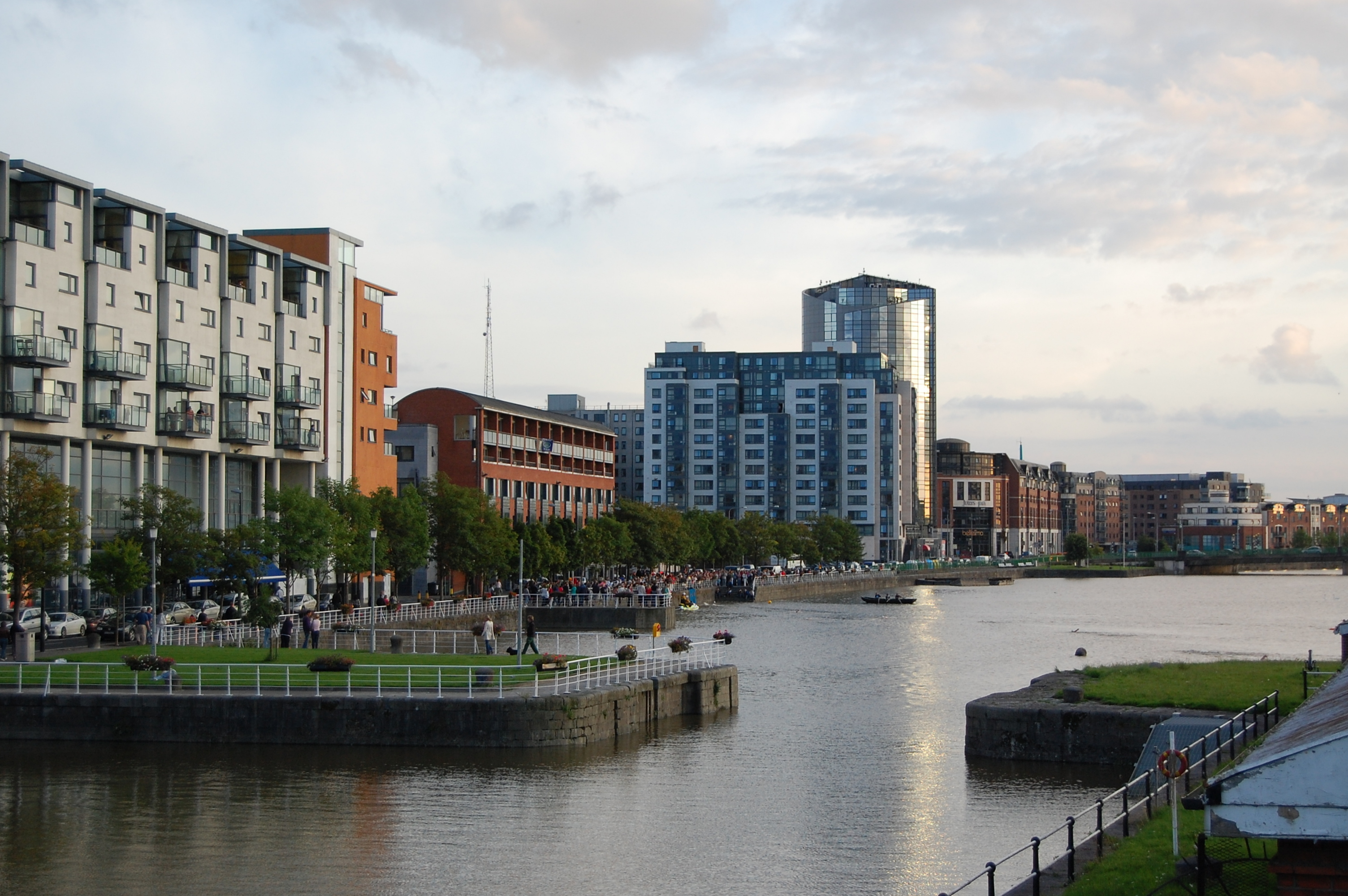
3rd, Limerick

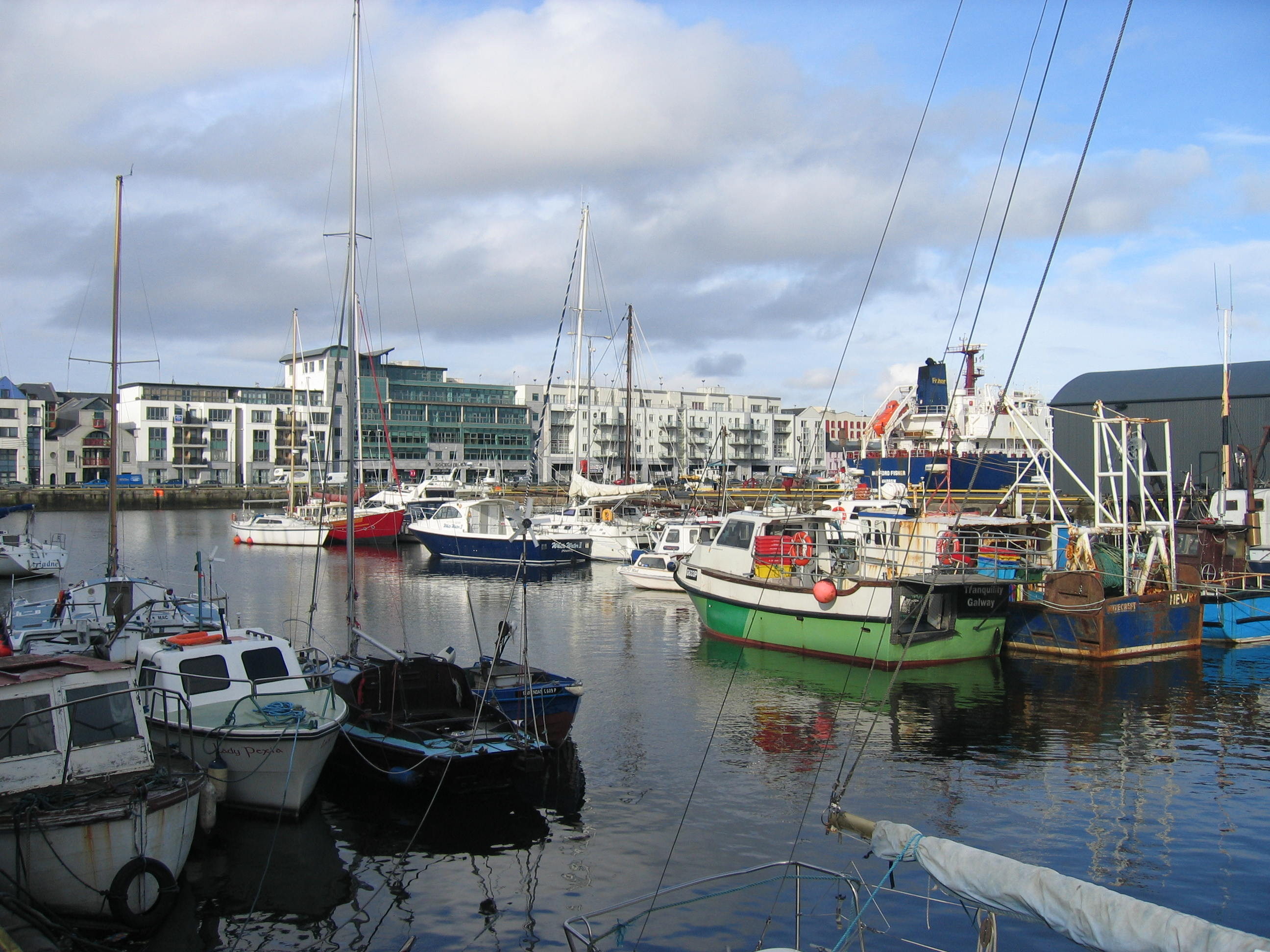
4th, Galway

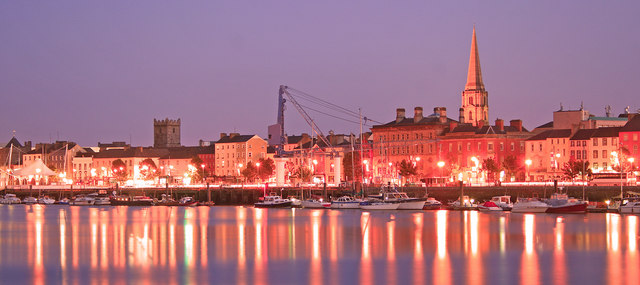
5th, Waterford

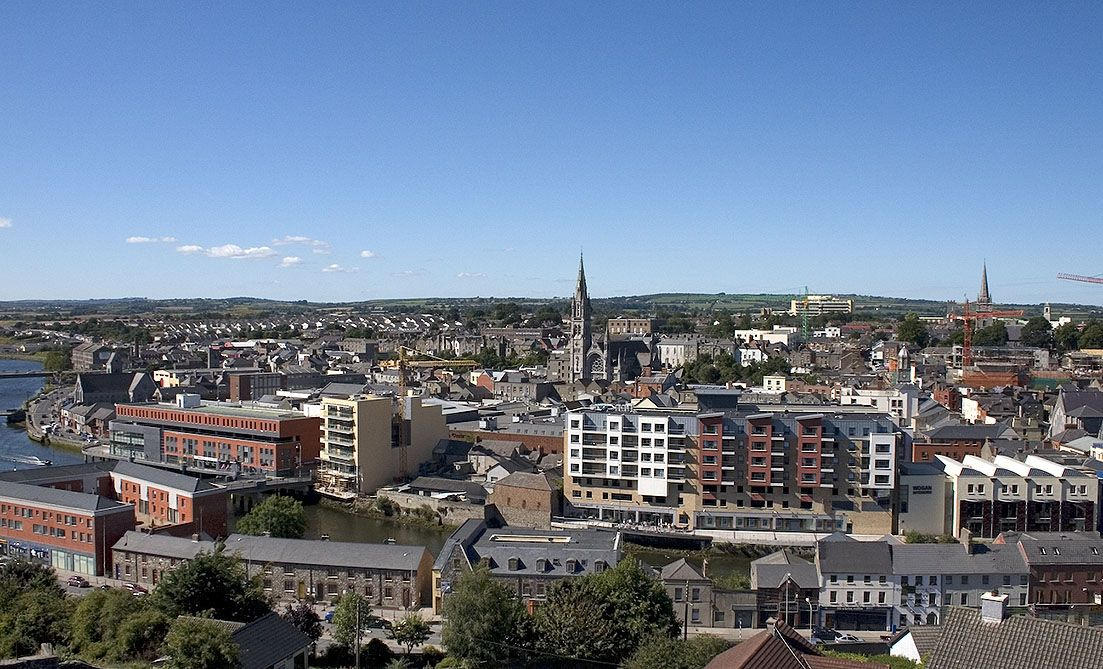
6th, Drogheda

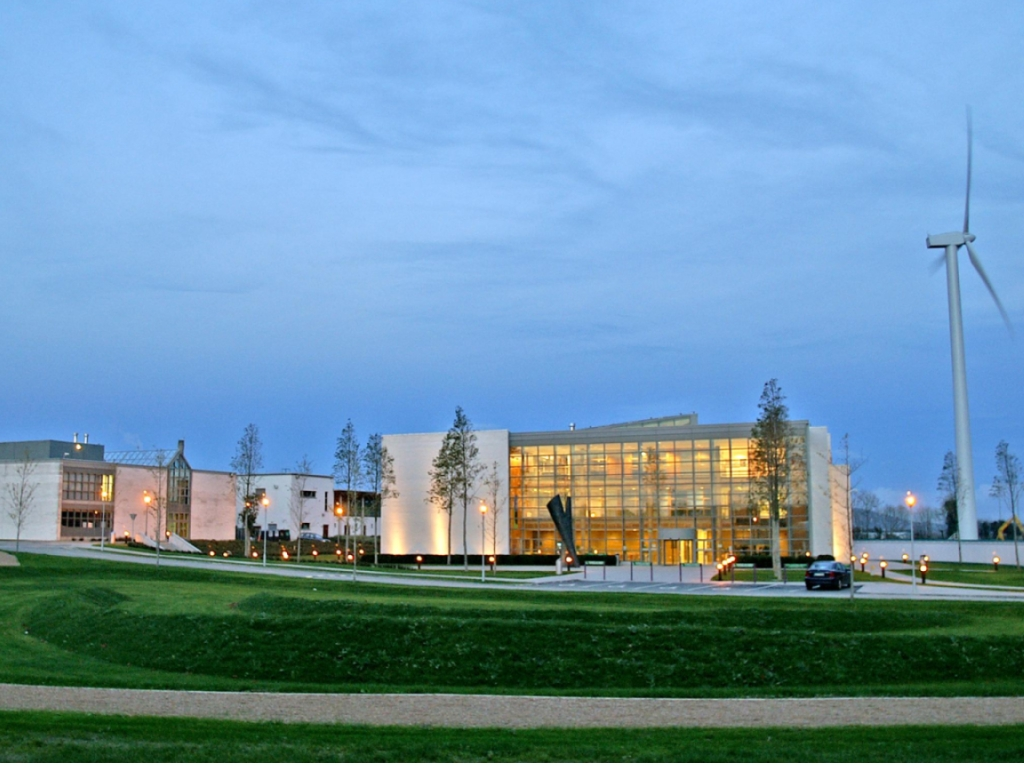
7th, Dundalk

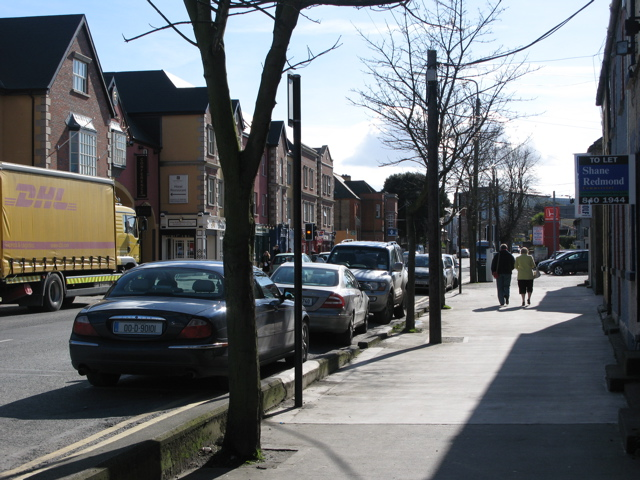
8th, Swords

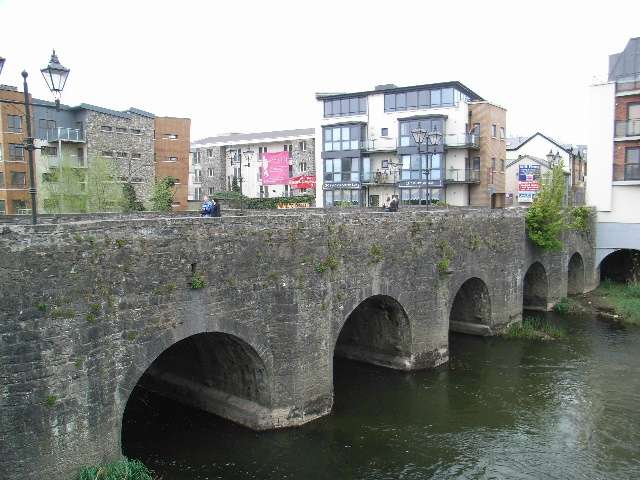
9th, Navan

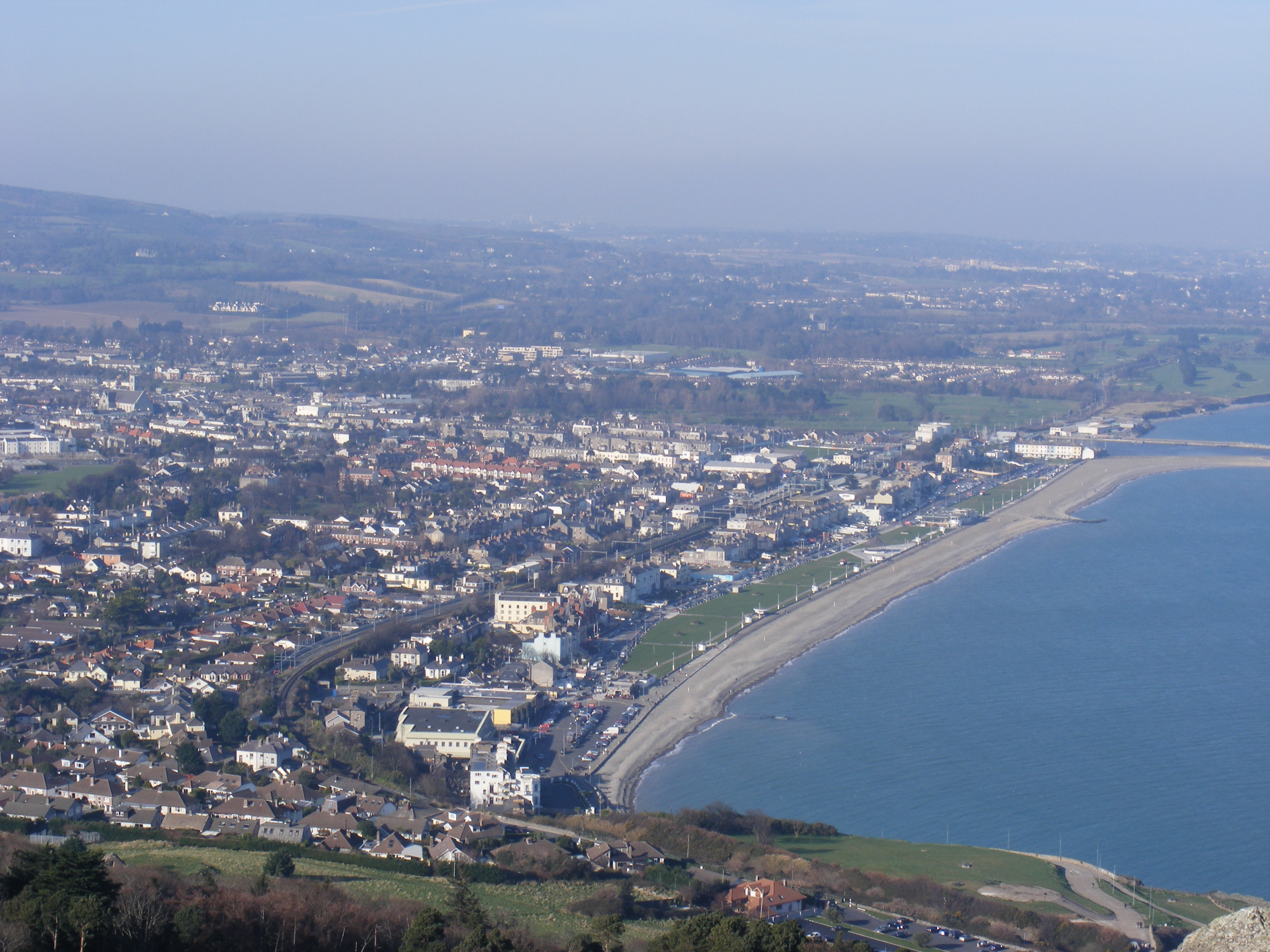
10th, Bray

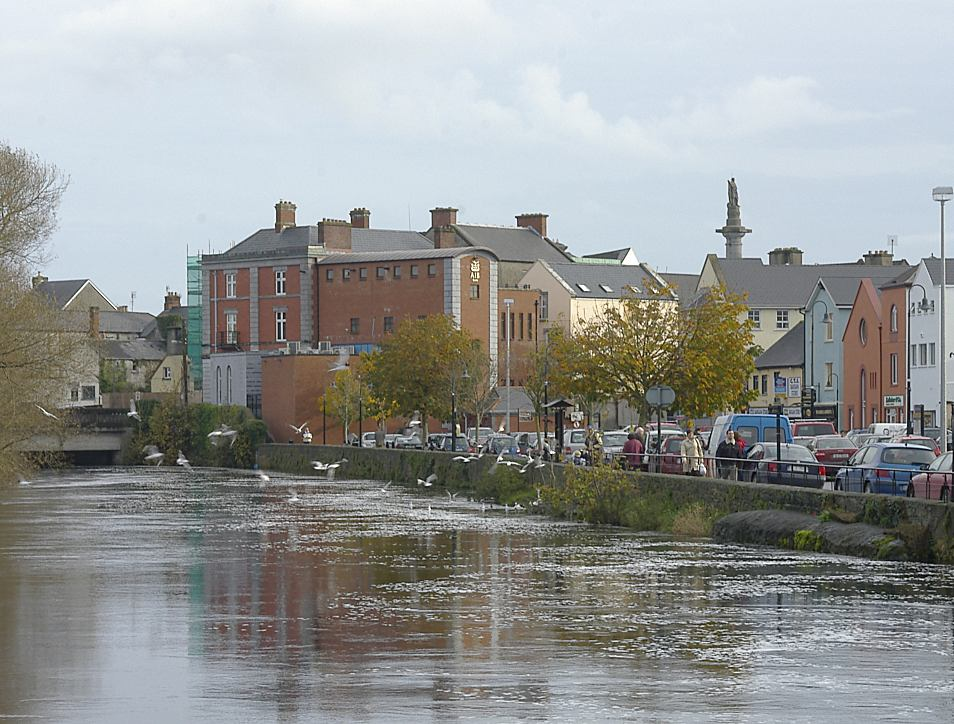
11th, Ennis

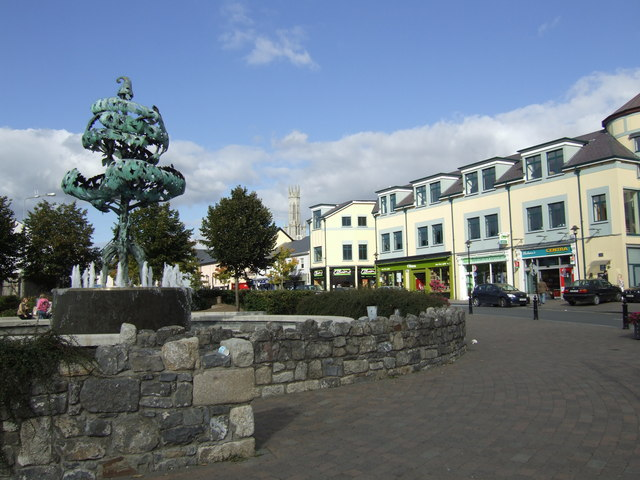
12th, Carlow

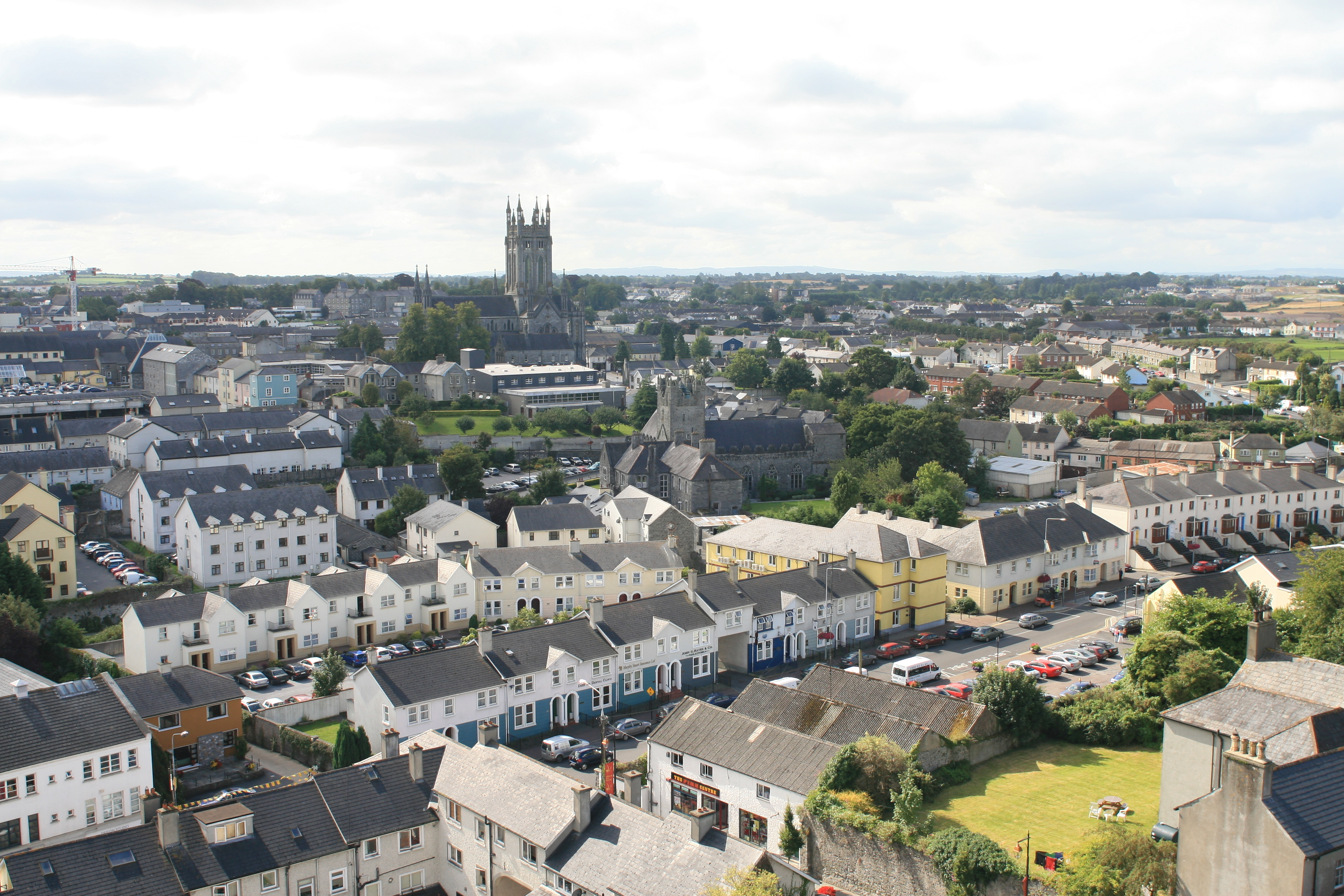
13th, Kilkenny

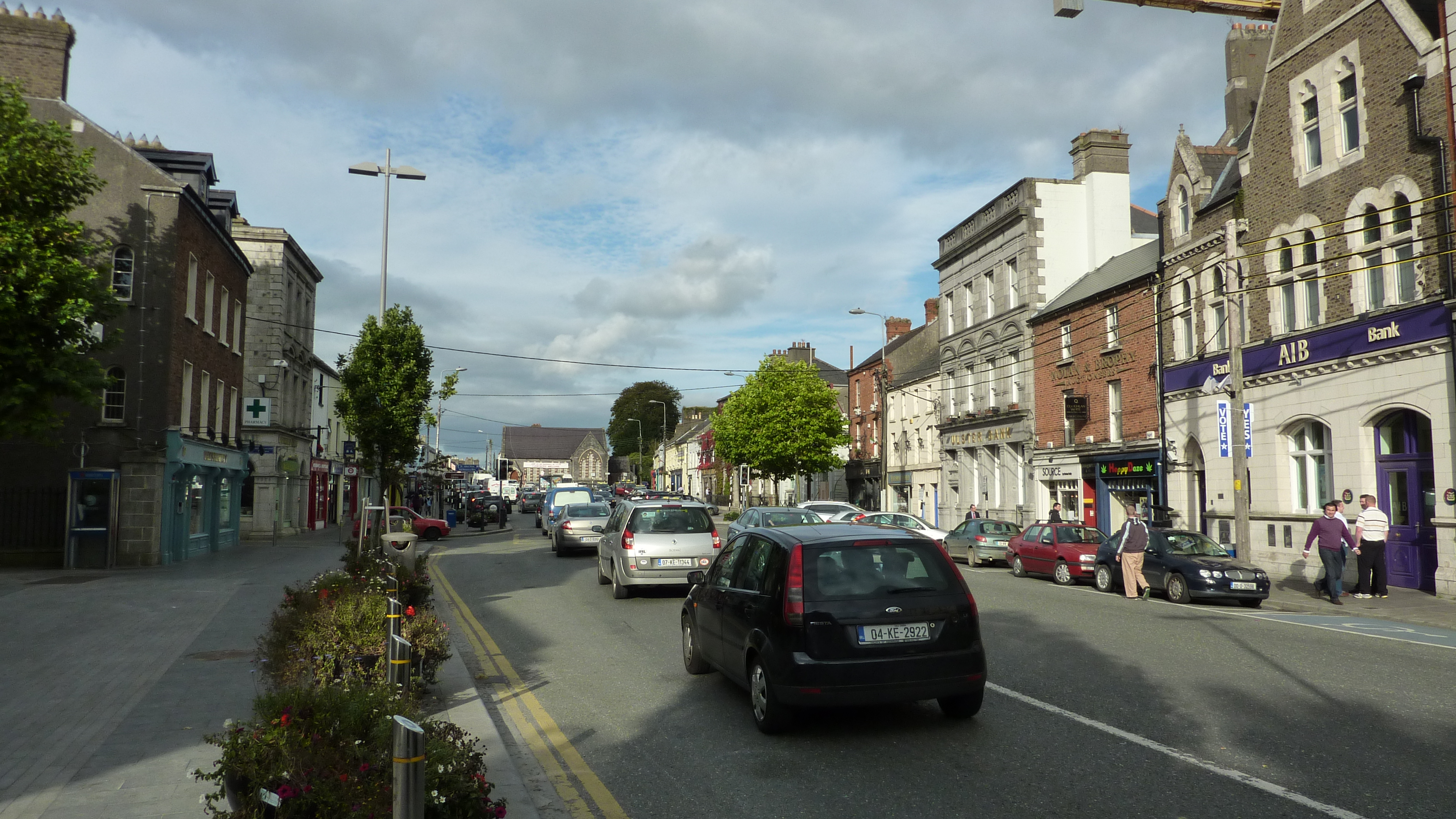
14th, Naas

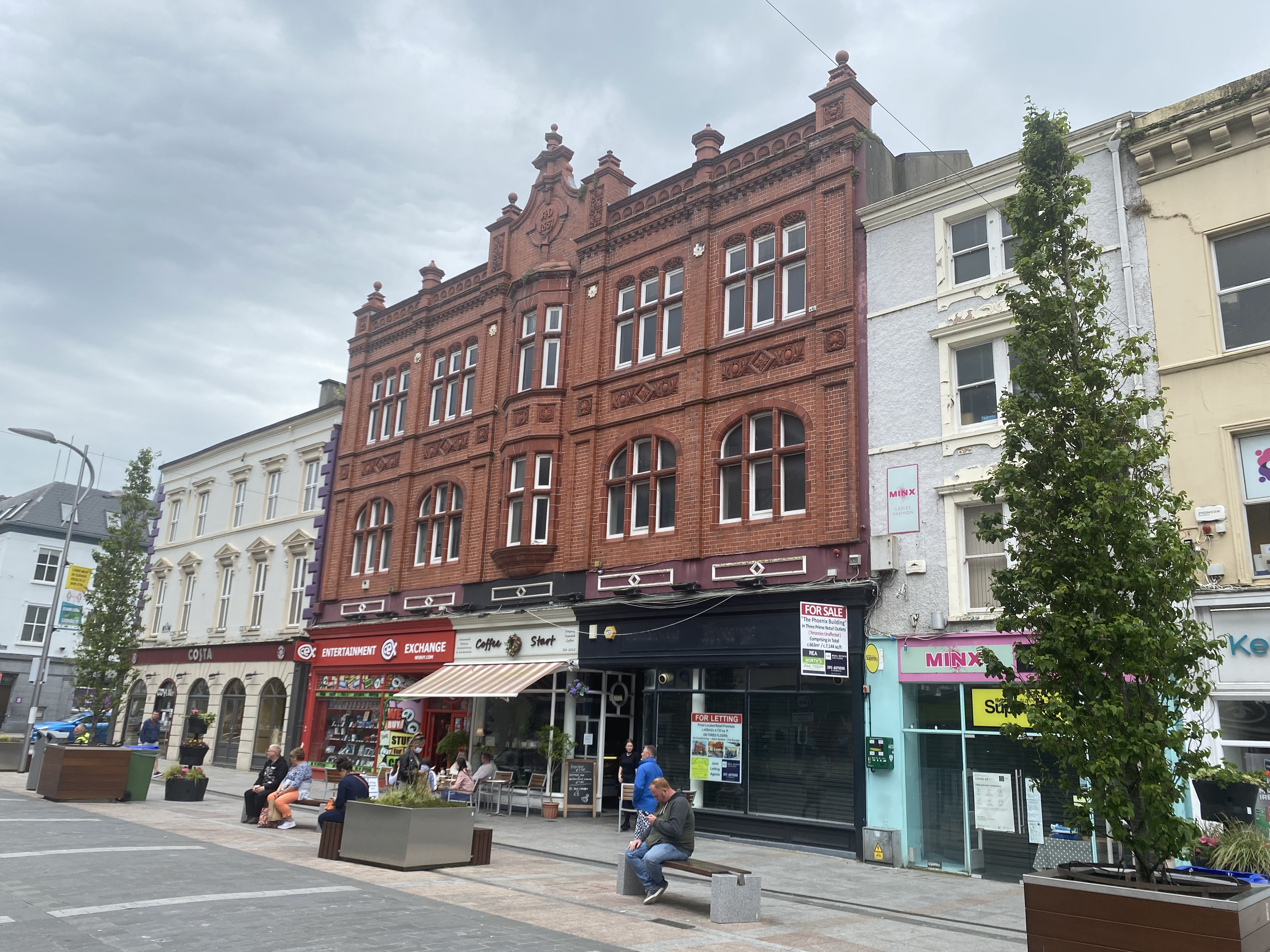
15th, Tralee

== See also ==
- List of urban areas in the Republic of Ireland for the 2016 census
- List of urban areas in the Republic of Ireland for the 2011 census
- List of urban areas in the Republic of Ireland for the 2006 census
- List of urban areas in the Republic of Ireland for the 2002 census
- List of towns and villages in the Republic of Ireland
- List of localities in Northern Ireland by population
- List of settlements on the island of Ireland by population
