= Urban areas in the Republic of Ireland for the 2016 census =

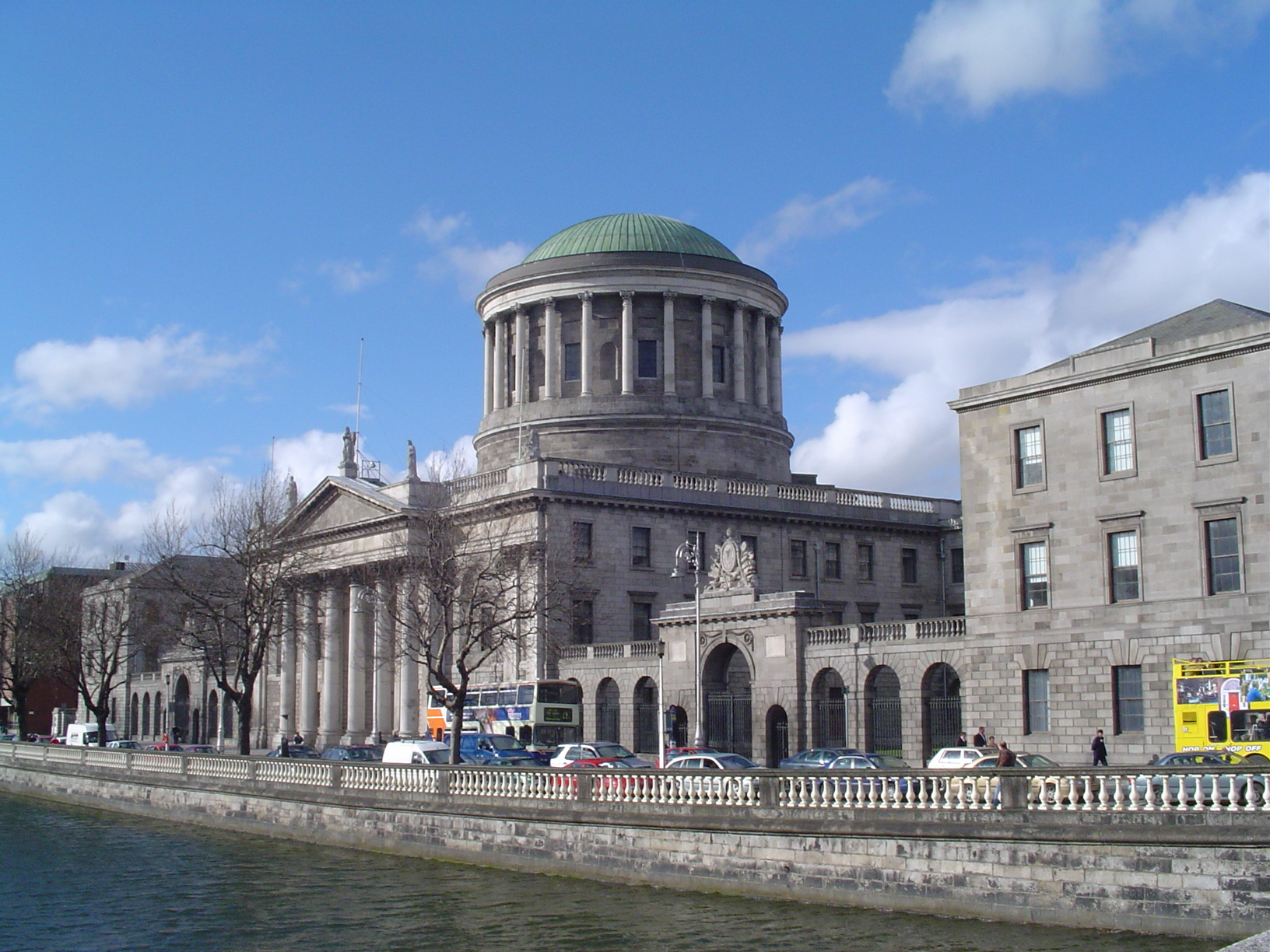
Dublin, the capital of Ireland

This is a list of urban areas in the Republic of Ireland with their populations from the 2016 census. The population represents the entire settlement area of each town and city (including suburbs and environs). For convenience, all cities included are shown in bold. This list includes the top 100 urban areas as defined by the Central Statistics Office in 2016.

== Cities and towns list ==
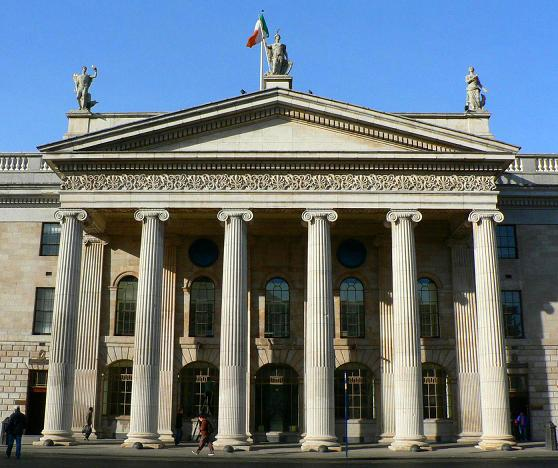
1st, Dublin

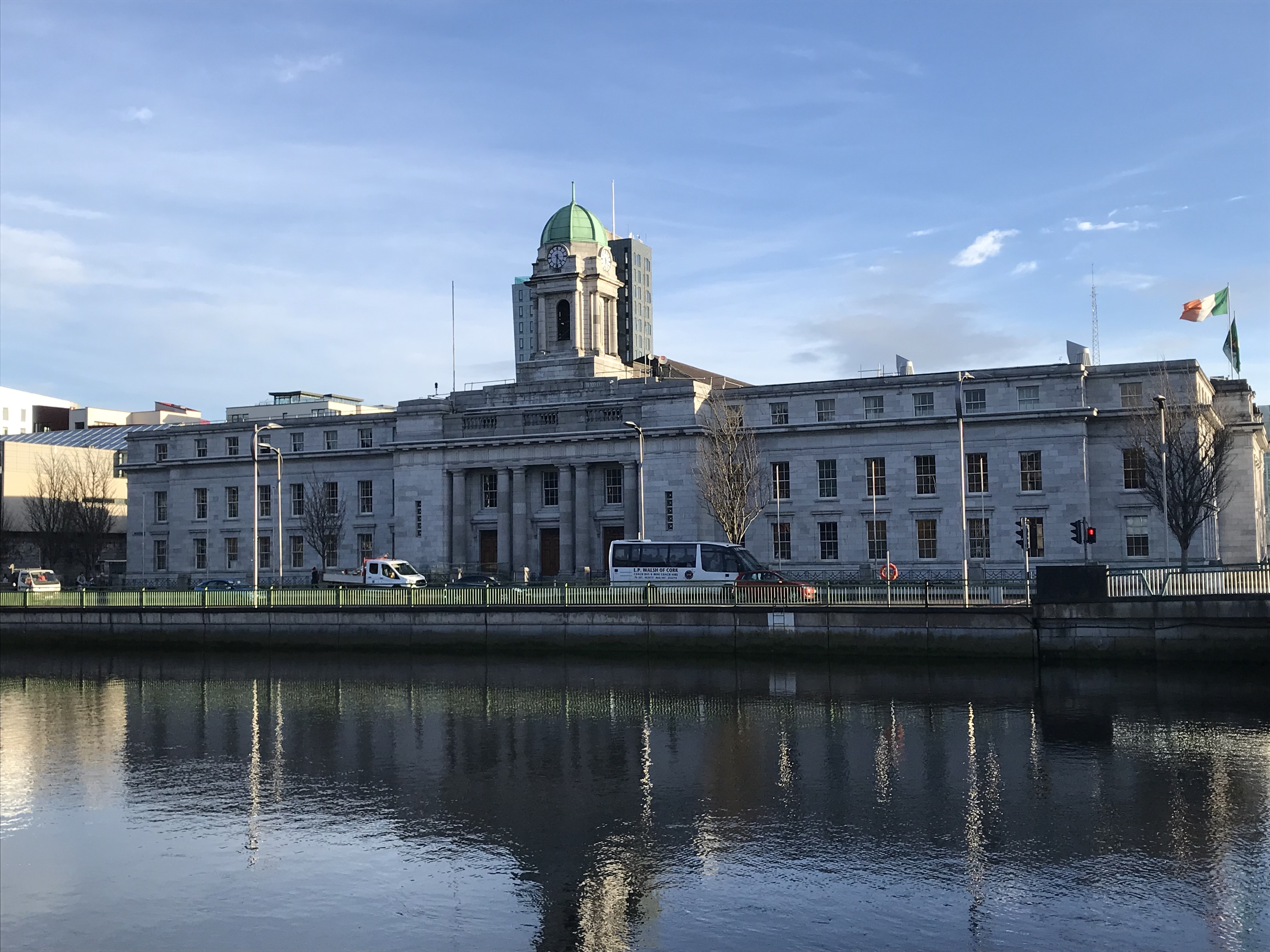
2nd, Cork

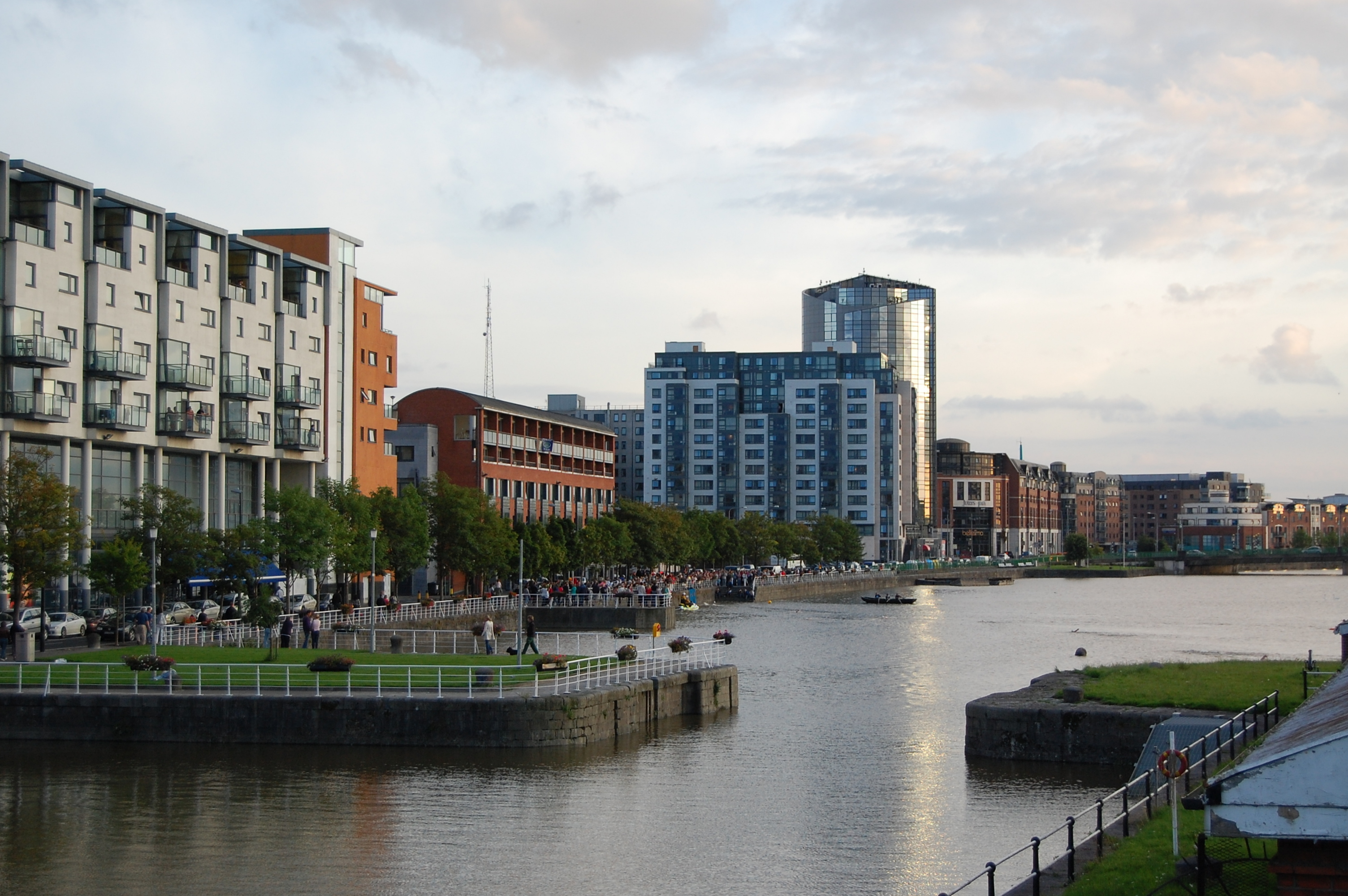
3rd, Limerick

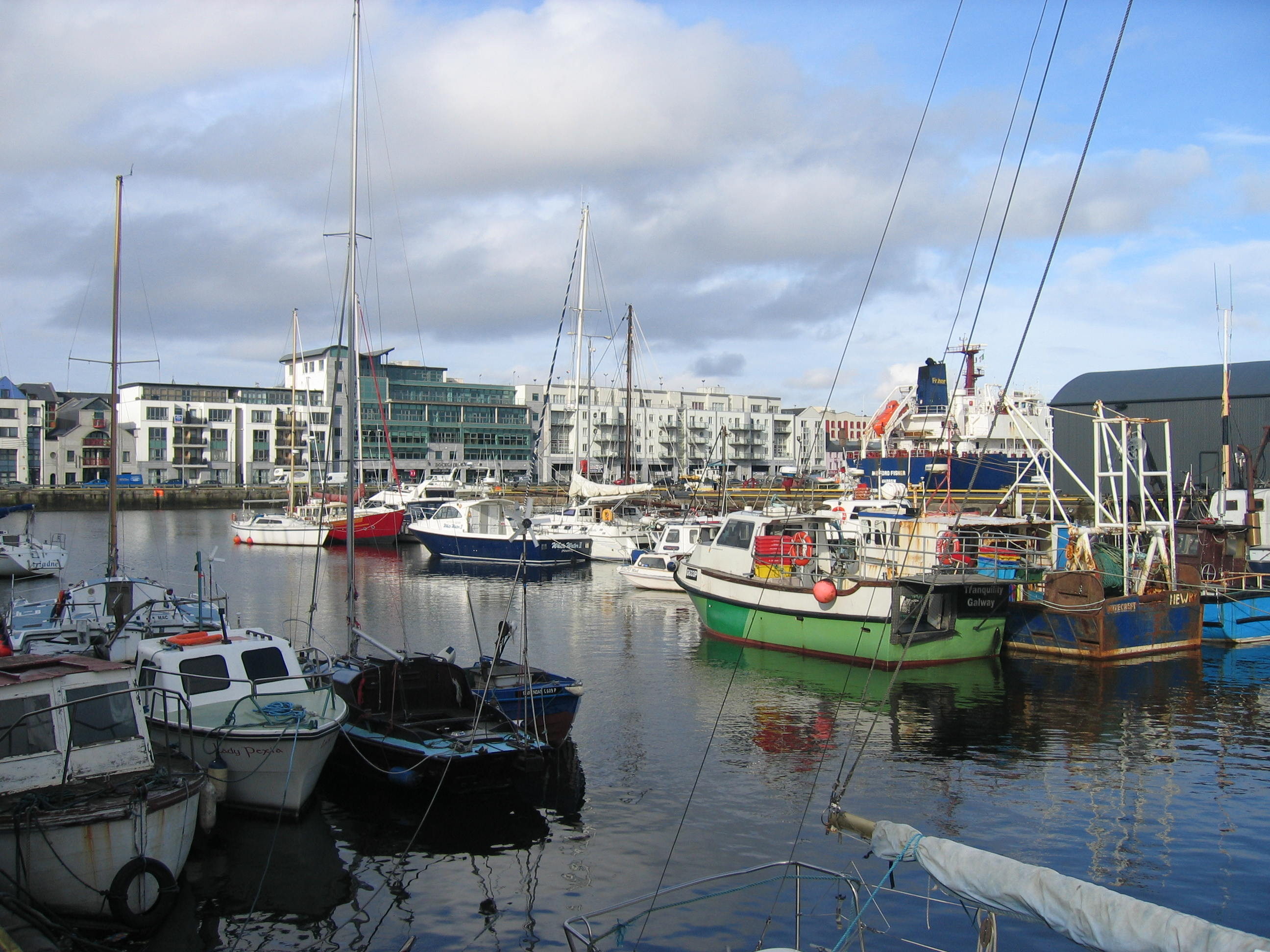
4th, Galway

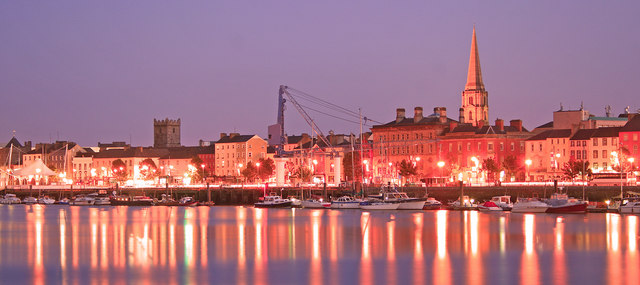
5th, Waterford

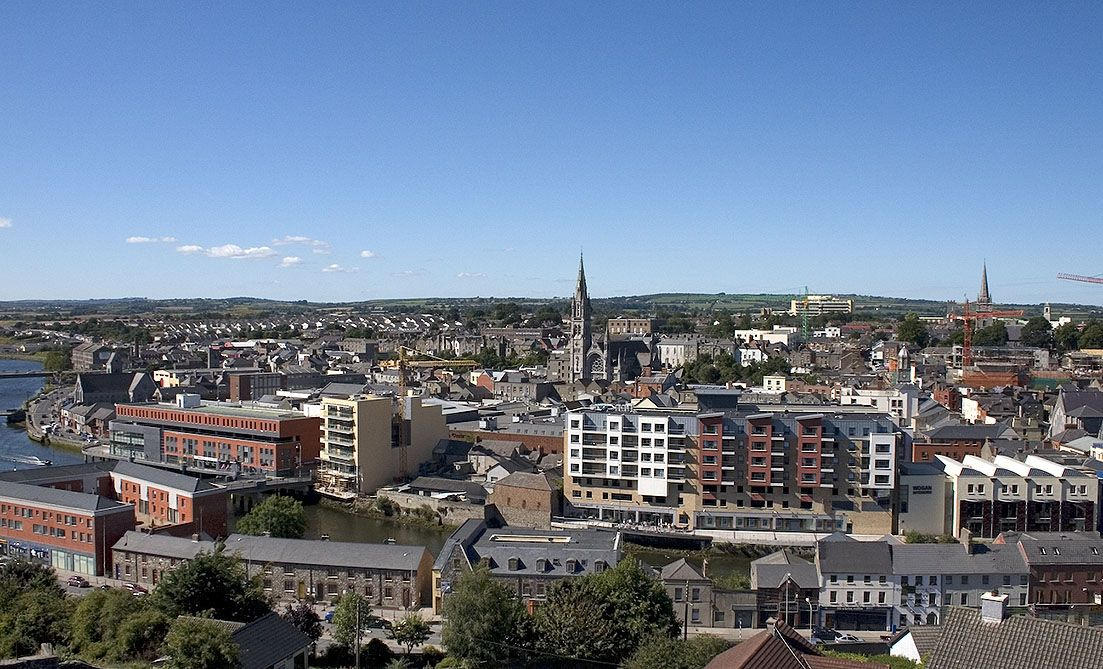
6th, Drogheda

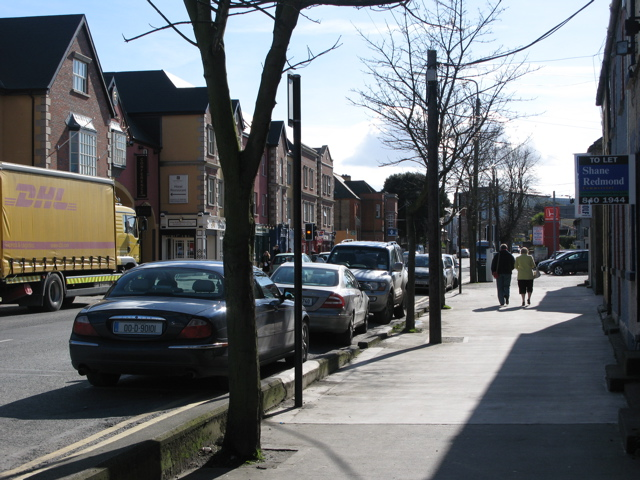
7th, Swords

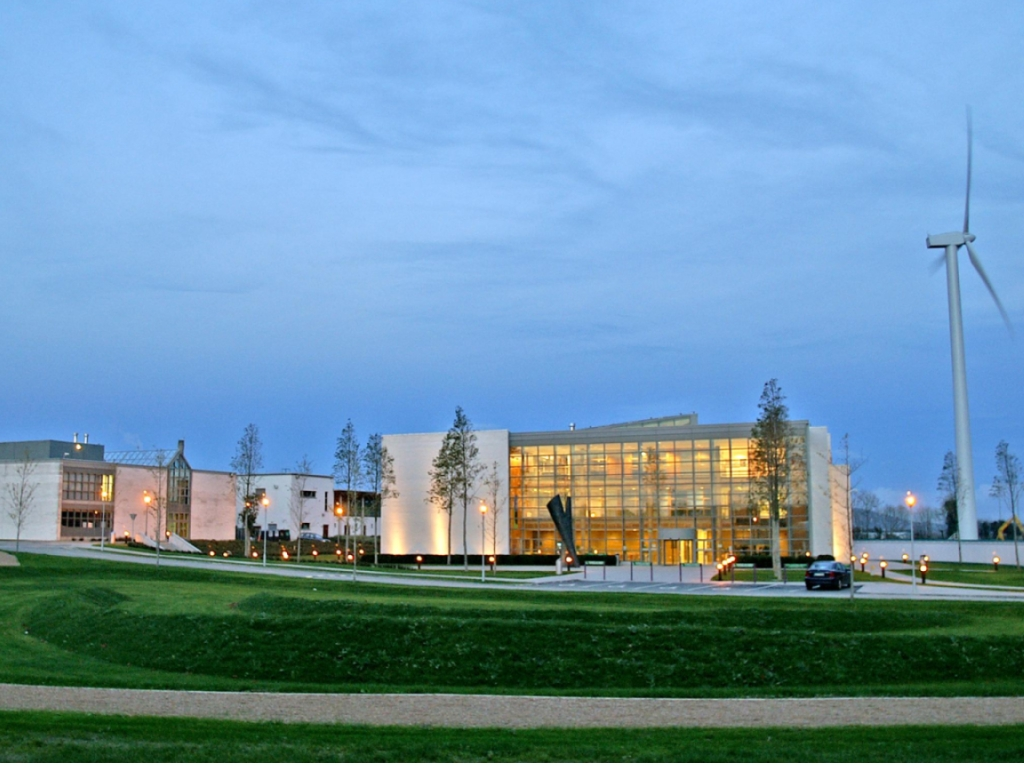
8th, Dundalk

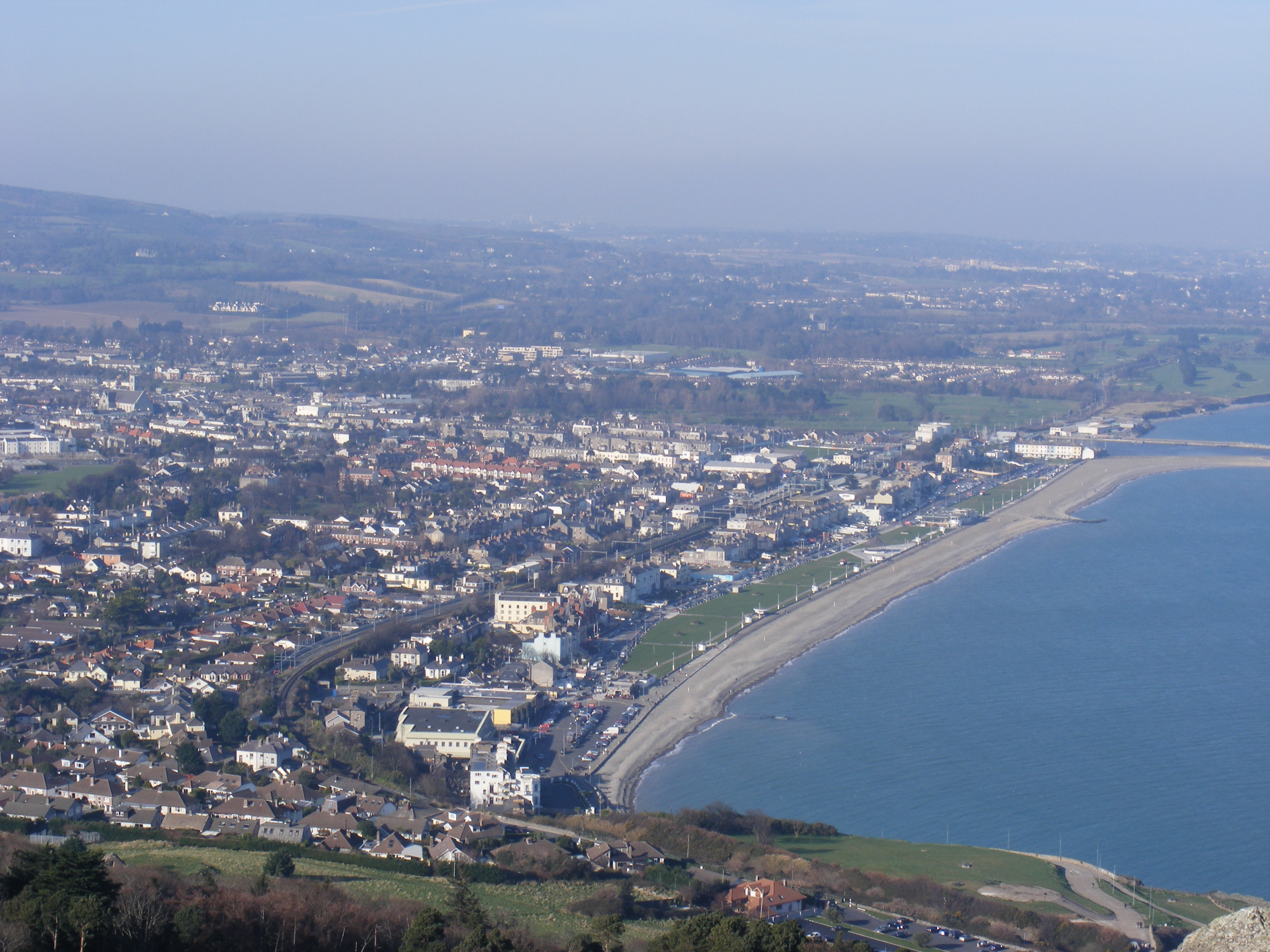
9th, Bray

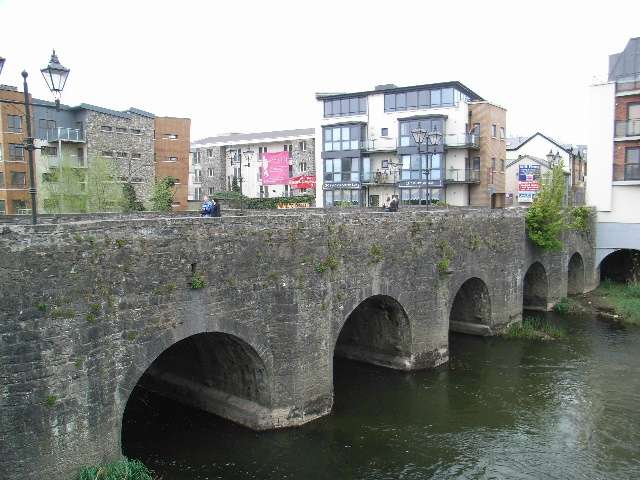
10th, Navan

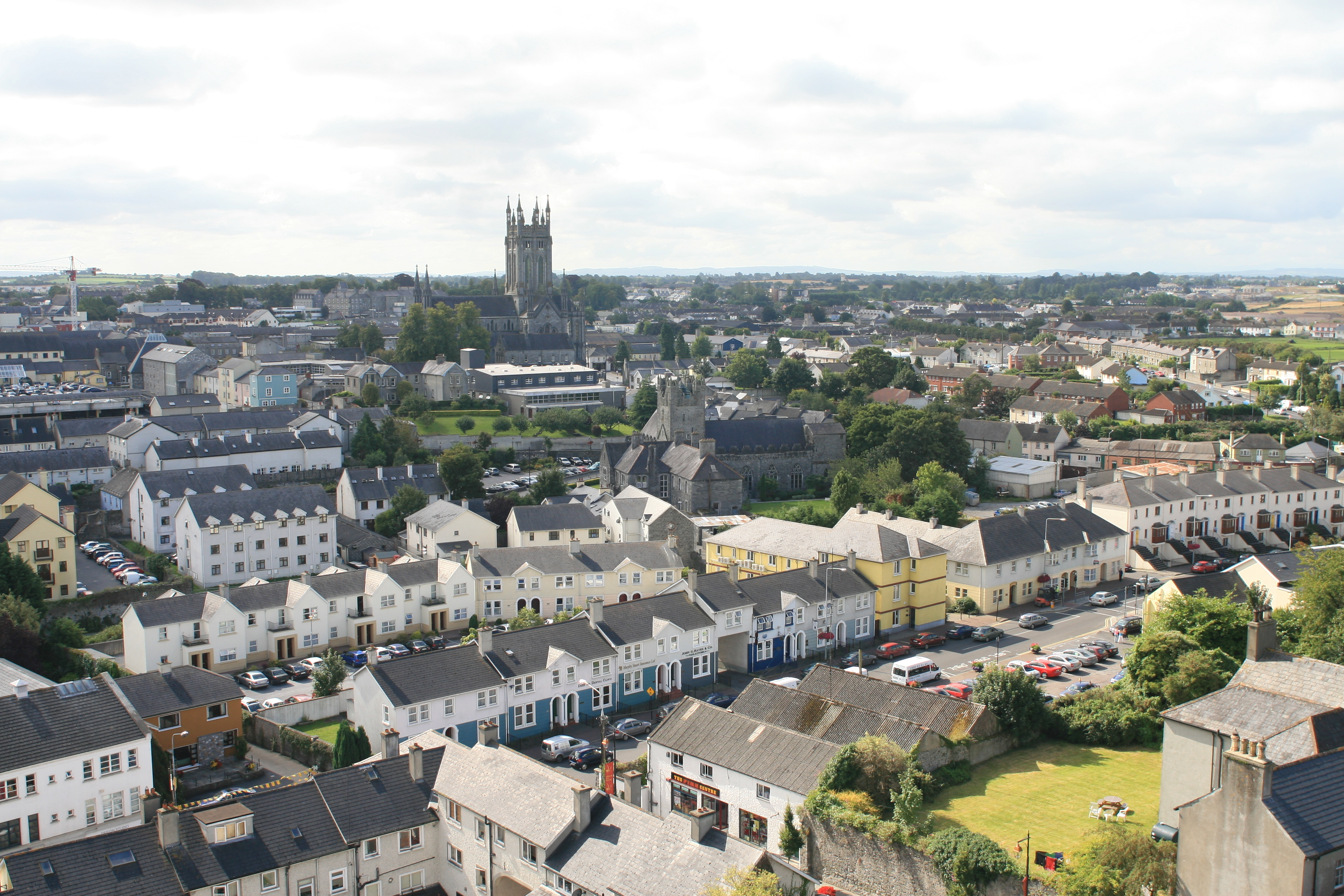
11th, Kilkenny

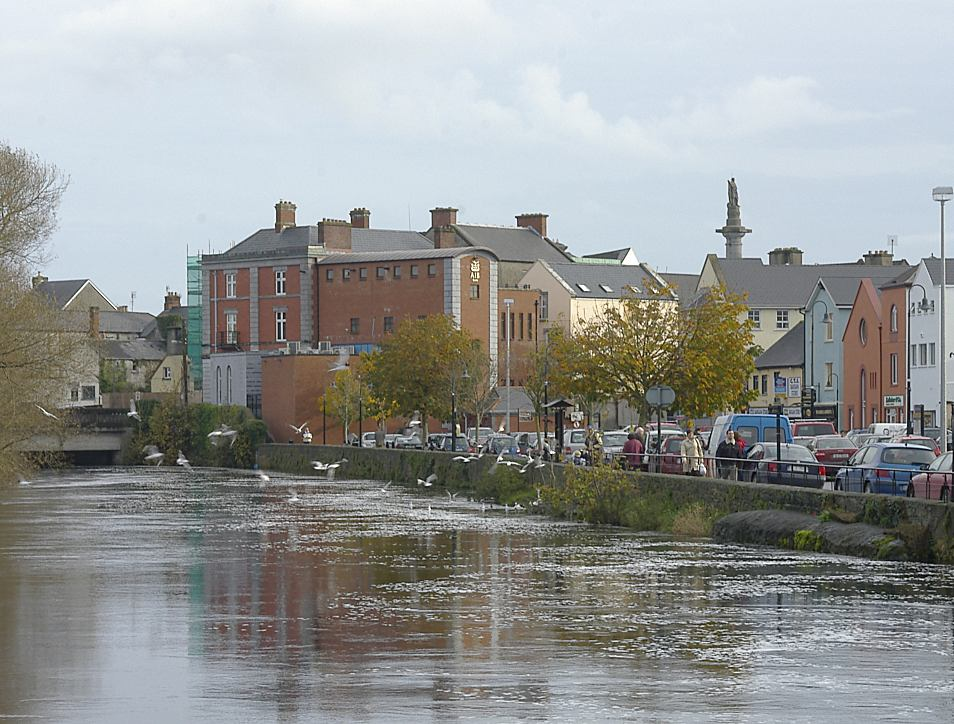
12th, Ennis

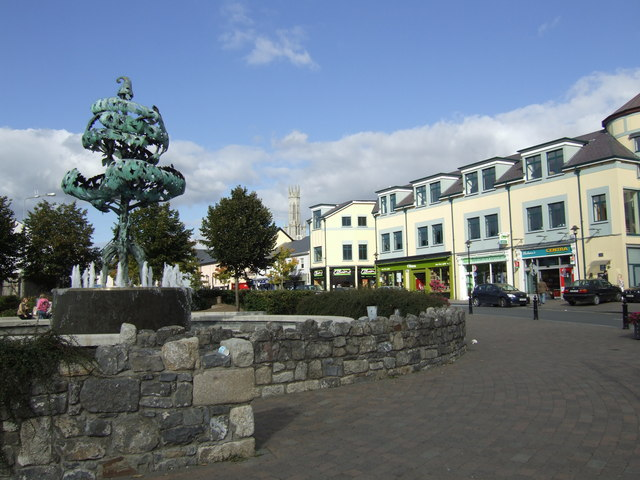
13th, Carlow

| Rank 2016 | Change since 2011 | Urban area | County | Population 2016 | Increase since 2011 |
|---|---|---|---|---|---|
| 1 | **0** | **Dublin** | County Dublin | 1,173,179 | 5.6% |
| 2 | **0** | **Cork** | County Cork | 208,669 | 5.1% |
| 3 | **0** | **Limerick** | County Limerick & County Clare | 94,192 | 3.0% |
| 4 | **0** | **Galway** | County Galway | 79,934 | 4.1% |
| 5 | **0** | **Waterford** | County Waterford & County Kilkenny | 53,504 | 3.9% |
| 6 | **0** | Drogheda | County Louth & County Meath | 40,956 | 6.2% |
| 7 | ▲**1** | Swords (Note: Swords is the county town of Fingal, an administrative county within the traditional County Dublin.) | County Dublin | 39,248 | 6.3% |
| 8 | ▼**1** | Dundalk | County Louth | 39,004 | 3.1% |
| 9 | **0** | Bray | County Wicklow & County Dublin | 32,600 | 2.3% |
| 10 | **0** | Navan | County Meath | 30,173 | 5.7% |
| 11 | ▲**1** | Kilkenny (Note: Kilkenny, while officially a town, may legally call itself a city. (Local Government Act, 2001 §10(16) and Local Government Act, 2001 §11(16).)) | County Kilkenny | 26,512 | 8.6% |
| 12 | ▼**1** | Ennis | County Clare | 25,276 | -0.3% |
| 13 | ▲**1** | Carlow | County Carlow & County Laois | 24,272 | 5.4% |
| 14 | ▼**1** | Tralee | County Kerry | 23,691 | -0.0% |
| 15 | **0** | Newbridge | County Kildare | 22,742 | 5.5% |
| 16 | ▲**2** | Portlaoise | County Laois | 22,050 | 9.5% |
| 17 | ▲**4** | Balbriggan | County Dublin | 21,722 | 8.8% |
| 18 | ▼**2** | Naas | County Kildare | 21,393 | 3.3% |
| 19 | ▼**2** | Athlone | County Westmeath & County Roscommon | 21,349 | 5.9% |
| 20 | ▼**1** | Mullingar | County Westmeath | 20,928 | 4.1% |
| 21 | ▲**2** | Celbridge | County Kildare | 20,288 | 3.8% |
| 22 | ▼**2** | Wexford | County Wexford | 20,188 | 0.6% |
| 23 | ▼**1** | Letterkenny | County Donegal | 19,274 | -1.6% |
| 24 | **0** | Sligo | County Sligo | 19,199 | -1.3% |
| 25 | ▲**1** | Greystones | County Wicklow | 18,140 | 3.8% |
| 26 | ▼**1** | Clonmel | County Tipperary & County Waterford | 17,140 | -4.3% |
| 27 | **0** | Malahide | County Dublin | 16,550 | 4.4% |
| 28 | ▲**1** | Carrigaline | County Cork | 15,770 | 6.7% |
| 29 | ▼**1** | Leixlip | County Kildare | 15,504 | 0.3% |
| 30 | **0** | Tullamore | County Offaly | 14,607 | 1.7% |
| 31 | ▲**2** | Maynooth | County Kildare | 14,585 | 16.6% |
| 32 | ▼**1** | Killarney | County Kerry | 14,504 | 2.0% |
| 33 | ▼**1** | Arklow | County Wicklow | 13,163 | 1.2% |
| 34 | **0** | Cobh | County Cork | 12,800 | 3.7% |
| 35 | ▲**3** | Ashbourne | County Meath | 12,679 | 11.7% |
| 36 | **0** | Midleton | County Cork | 12,496 | 4.1% |
| 37 | **0** | Mallow | County Cork | 12,459 | 7.4% |
| 38 | ▼**3** | Castlebar | County Mayo | 12,068 | -2.0% |
| 39 | ▲**1** | Laytown–Bettystown–Mornington–Donacarney | County Meath | 11,872 | 9.0% |
| 40 | ▲**1** | Enniscorthy | County Wexford | 11,381 | 5.0% |
| 41 | ▲**3** | Cavan | County Cavan | 10,914 | 6.4% |
| 42 | **0** | Wicklow | County Wicklow | 10,584 | 2.2% |
| 43 | **0** | Tramore | County Waterford | 10,381 | 0.5% |
| 44 | ▼**5** | Ballina | County Mayo | 10,171 | -8.3% |
| 45 | ▲**2** | Skerries | County Dublin | 10,043 | 3.8% |
| 46 | ▲**2** | Longford | County Longford | 10,008 | 4.2% |
| 47 | ▲**4** | Rush | County Dublin | 9,943 | 7.7% |
| 48 | ▲**4** | Gorey | County Wexford | 9,822 | 7.8% |
| 49 | ▼**3** | Shannon | County Clare | 9,729 | 0.6% |
| 50 | ▼**5** | Athy | County Kildare | 9,677 | -2.5% |
| 51 | ▲**2** | Ratoath | County Meath | 9,533 | 5.4% |
| 52 | ▼**2** | Portmarnock | County Dublin | 9,466 | 1.9% |
| 53 | ▼**4** | Dungarvan | County Waterford | 9,227 | -2.1% |
| 54 | ▲**1** | Trim | County Meath | 9,194 | 11.2% |
| 55 | ▼**1** | Nenagh | County Tipperary | 8,968 | 6.3% |
| 56 | **0** | Tuam | County Galway | 8,767 | 6.4% |
| 57 | ▲**1** | Kildare | County Kildare | 8,634 | 6.0% |
| 58 | ▲**3** | Portarlington | County Laois & County Offaly | 8,368 | 7.4% |
| 59 | ▼**2** | New Ross | County Wexford | 8,040 | -1.4% |
| 60 | **0** | Youghal | County Cork | 7,963 | 2.2% |
| 61 | ▼**2** | Thurles | County Tipperary | 7,940 | 0.1% |
| 62 | ▲**1** | Lusk | County Dublin | 7,786 | 10.9% |
| 63 | ▼**1** | Monaghan | County Monaghan | 7,678 | 3.0% |
| 64 | ▲**3** | Donabate | County Dublin | 7,443 | 9.8% |
| 65 | ▼**1** | Edenderry | County Offaly | 7,359 | 5.5% |
| 66 | ▲**2** | Clane | County Kildare | 7,280 | 8.6% |
| 67 | ▼**2** | Dunboyne | County Meath | 7,272 | 4.5% |
| 68 | ▲**2** | Bandon | County Cork | 6,957 | 4.8% |
| 69 | ▼**3** | Buncrana | County Donegal | 6,785 | -0.8% |
| 70 | ▼**1** | Ballinasloe | County Galway & County Roscommon | 6,662 | 0.0% |
| 71 | ▲**6** | Kinsealy–Drinan | County Dublin | 6,643 | 14.3% |
| 72 | **0** | Newcastle West | County Limerick | 6,619 | 4.6% |
| 73 | ▼**2** | Fermoy | County Cork | 6,585 | 1.5% |
| 74 | ▼**1** | Westport | County Mayo | 6,198 | 2.2% |
| 75 | **0** | Kells | County Meath | 6,135 | 4.2% |
| 76 | ▲**4** | Kilcock | County Kildare | 6,093 | 10.1% |
| 77 | ▲**2** | Roscommon | County Roscommon | 5,876 | 3.2% |
| 78 | ▲**5** | Sallins | County Kildare | 5,849 | 10.7% |
| 79 | ▼**1** | Passage West | County Cork | 5,843 | 0.9% |
| 80 | ▼**6** | Carrick-on-Suir | County Tipperary & County Waterford | 5,771 | -2.7% |
| 81 | ▼**5** | Birr | County Offaly & County Tipperary | 5,741 | -1.3% |
| 82 | ▲**3** | Loughrea | County Galway | 5,556 | 9.8% |
| 83 | ▲**3** | Blessington | County Wicklow | 5,520 | 10.2% |
| 84 | ▼**2** | Roscrea | County Tipperary | 5,446 | 0.8% |
| 85 | ▲**4** | Kinsale | County Cork | 5,281 | 7.9% |
| 86 | ▲**9** | Carrigtwohill | County Cork | 5,080 | 11.6% |
| 87 | ▲**1** | Carrickmacross | County Monaghan | 5,032 | 2.2% |
| 88 | ▲**4** | Oranmore | County Galway | 4,990 | 4.0% |
| 89 | ▼**6** | Tipperary | County Tipperary | 4,979 | -6.2% |
| 90 | ▼**3** | Ardee | County Louth | 4,928 | 0.0% |
| 91 | ▼**1** | Ballybofey–Stranorlar | County Donegal | 4,852 | 0.0% |
| 92 | ▼**1** | Listowel | County Kerry | 4,820 | -0.2% |
| 93 | **0** | Mountmellick | County Laois | 4,777 | 0.9% |
| 94 | ▲**6** | Tullow | County Carlow | 4,673 | 17.6% |
| 95 | ▼**1** | Clonakilty | County Cork | 4,592 | -2.7% |
| 96 | ▲**5** | Athenry | County Galway | 4,445 | 12.5% |
| 97 | ▼**1** | Cashel | County Tipperary | 4,422 | 9.2% |
| 98 | ▲ **new** | Rathcoole | County Dublin | 4,351 | 27.2% |
| 99 | ▲ **new** | Monasterevin | County Kildare | 4,246 | 14.4% |
| 100 | ▼**4** | Kilcoole | County Wicklow | 4,239 | 4.7% |

== See also ==
- List of towns and villages in the Republic of Ireland
- List of urban areas in the Republic of Ireland/2011 census
- List of urban areas in the Republic of Ireland/2006 census
- List of urban areas in the Republic of Ireland/2002 census
- List of localities in Northern Ireland by population
- List of settlements on the island of Ireland by population
