= Urban areas in the Republic of Ireland for the 2006 census =

List of towns, together with their population as recorded by the 2006 Census of Ireland. Towns with fewer than 1,000 people are not listed.

Town	County	Population
Abbeyfeale	Limerick	1,940
Abbeyleix	Laois	1,568
An Bun Beag-Doirí Beaga	Donegal	1,359
An Clochán Liath	Donegal	1,068
Annacotty	Limerick	1,839
Ardee	Louth	4,694
Ardnacrusha (Castlebank)	Clare	1,169
Arklow	Wicklow	11,712
Ashbourne	Meath	8,528
Ashford	Wicklow	1,349
Athboy	Meath	2,213
Athenry	Galway	3,205
Athlone	Westmeath	17,544
Athy	Kildare	8,218
Aughrim	Wicklow	1,145
Bailieborough	Cavan	1,966
Balbriggan	Dublin	15,559
Ballaghaderreen	Roscommon	1,720
Ballina	Mayo	10,409
Ballina	Tipperary	1,861
Ballinasloe	Galway	6,303
Ballinrobe	Mayo	2,098
Ballivor	Meath	1,212
Ballybay	Monaghan	1,217
Ballybofey-Stranorlar	Donegal	4,176
Ballybunion	Kerry	1,365
Ballygeary	Wexford	1,041
Ballyhaunis	Mayo	1,708
Ballyjamesduff	Cavan	1,690
Ballymote	Sligo	1,229
Ballyragget	Kilkenny	1,014
Ballyshannon	Donegal	2,686
Baltinglass	Wicklow	1,735
Banagher	Offaly	1,636
Bandon	Cork	5,822
Bantry	Cork	3,309
Béal an Mhuirthead	Mayo	1,074
Belturbet	Cavan	1,395
Birr	Offaly	5,081
Blarney	Cork	2,400
Blessington	Wicklow	4,018
Boyle	Roscommon	2,522
Bray	Wicklow	31,901
Bunclody-Carrickduff	Carlow	1,863
Buncrana	Donegal	5,911
Bundoran	Donegal	1,964
Cahir	Tipperary	3,381
Cahersiveen	Kerry	1,294
Callan	Kilkenny	1,771
Carlow	Carlow	20,724
Carndonagh	Donegal	1,923
Carrickmacross	Monaghan	4,387
Carrick-on-Shannon	Leitrim	3,163
Carrick-on-Suir	Tipperary	5,856
Carrigaline	Cork	12,835
Carrigtwohill	Cork	2,782
Cashel	Tipperary	2,936
Castlebar	Mayo	11,891
Castleblayney	Monaghan	3,124
Castlebridge	Wexford	1,624
Castlecomer-Donaguile	Kilkenny	1,531
Castleconnell	Limerick	1,330
Castleisland	Kerry	2,300
Castlepollard	Westmeath	1,004
Castlerea	Roscommon	1,873
Cavan	Cavan	7,883
Ceannanus Mór	Meath	5,248
Celbridge	Kildare	17,262
Clane	Kildare	4,968
Clara	Offaly	3,001
Claremorris	Mayo	2,595
Clifden	Galway	1,497
Clogherhead	Louth	1,558
Clonakilty	Cork	4,154
Clonee	Meath	1,000
Clones	Monaghan	1,767
Clonmel	Tipperary	17,008
Cloyne	Cork	1,095
Cobh	Cork	11,303
Convoy	Donegal	1,193
Cootehill	Cavan	1,892
Cork City and Suburbs	Cork	190,384
Courtown	Wexford	1,421
Croom	Limerick	1,045
Crosshaven	Cork	1,669
Daingean	Offaly	1,056
Daingean Uí Chúis	Kerry	1,920
Derrinturn	Kildare	1,138
Donabate	Dublin	5,499
Donegal	Donegal	2,339
Drogheda & Environs	Louth	35,090
Drogheda (within legal boundary)	Louth	28,973
Droichead Nua	Kildare	18,520
Dublin City and Suburbs	Dublin	1,045,769
Duleek	Meath	3,236
Dunboyne	Meath	5,713
Dundalk & Suburbs	Louth	35,085
Dundalk (within legal boundary)	Louth	29,037
Dungarvan	Waterford	8,362
Dunleer	Louth	1,449
Dunmanway	Cork	1,522
Dunmore East	Waterford	1,547
Dunshaughlin	Meath	3,384
Edenderry	Offaly	5,888
Enfield	Meath	2,161
Ennis	Clare	24,253
Enniscorthy	Wexford	9,538
Enniskerry	Wicklow	1,881
Ferbane	Offaly	1,164
Fermoy	Cork	5,873
Fethard	Tipperary	1,374
Foxford	Mayo	1,058
Galway City and Suburbs	Galway	72,729
Gorey	Wexford	7,193
Gort	Galway	2,734
Graiguenamanagh-Tinnahinch	Kilkenny	1,376
Greystones	Wicklow	14,569
Kanturk	Cork	1,915
Kenmare	Kerry	1,701
Kilcock	Kildare	4,100
Kilcoole	Wicklow	3,252
Kilcullen	Kildare	2,985
Kildare	Kildare	7,538
Kilkee	Clare	1,325
Kilkenny	Kilkenny	22,179
Kill	Kildare	2,510
Killaloe	Clare	1,035
Killarney	Kerry	14,603
Killorglin	Kerry	1,627
Killybegs	Donegal	1,280
Kilmallock	Limerick	1,443
Kilrush	Clare	2,657
Kiltimagh	Mayo	1,096
Kingscourt	Cavan	1,748
Kinnegad	Westmeath	2,245
Kinsale	Cork	4,099
Kinsealy-Drinan	Dublin	3,651
Lanesborough-Ballyleague	Longford	1,112
Laytown-Bettystown-Mornington	Meath	8,978
Leixlip	Kildare	14,676
Letterkenny	Donegal	17,586
Lifford	Donegal	1,448
Limerick City and Suburbs	Limerick	90,757
Lismore	Waterford	1,240
Listowel	Kerry	4,338
Longford	Longford	8,836
Loughrea	Galway	4,532
Lusk	Dublin	5,236
Macroom	Cork	3,553
Maigh Cuilinn	Galway	1,237
Malahide	Dublin	14,937
Mallow	Cork	10,241
Manorhamilton	Leitrim	1,158
Maynooth	Kildare	10,715
Meathas Truim	Longford	1,221
Midleton	Cork	10,048
Millstreet	Cork	1,401
Mitchelstown	Cork	3,365
Moate	Westmeath	1,888
Monaghan	Monaghan	6,710
Monasterevin	Kildare	3,017
Mooncoin	Kilkenny	1,002
Mountmellick	Laois	4,069
Mountrath	Laois	1,435
Moville	Donegal	1,427
Muine Bheag	Carlow	2,735
Mullingar	Westmeath	18,416
Naas	Kildare	20,044
Navan (An Uaimh)	Meath	24,851
Nenagh	Tipperary	7,751
New Ross	Wexford	7,709
Newcastle West	Limerick	5,098
Newcastle	Dublin	1,506
Newmarket-on-Fergus	Clare	1,542
Newport	Tipperary	1,286
Newtownmountkennedy	Wicklow	2,548
Oldcastle	Meath	1,316
Oranmore	Galway	3,513
Oughterard	Galway	1,305
Passage West	Cork	5,203
Portarlington South	Laois	5,054
Portarlington North	Laois	2,038
Portlaoise	Laois	14,613
Portlaw	Waterford	1,495
Portmarnock	Dublin	8,979
Portrane	Dublin	1,532
Portumna	Galway	1,377
Prosperous	Kildare	1,939
Ramelton	Donegal	1,088
Raphoe	Donegal	1,065
Rathangan	Kildare	1,718
Rathcoole	Dublin	2,927
Rathcormac	Cork	1,072
Rathdowney	Laois	1,212
Rathdrum	Wicklow	1,405
Rathkeale	Limerick	1,494
Rathluirc	Cork	2,984
Rathnew	Wicklow	1,849
Ratoath	Meath	7,249
Rochfortbridge	Westmeath	1,473
Roscommon	Roscommon	5,017
Roscrea	Tipperary	4,910
Rosslare	Wexford	1,359
Rush	Dublin	8,286
Sallins	Kildare	3,806
Shannon	Clare	9,222
Sixmilebridge	Clare	1,659
Skerries	Dublin	9,535
Skibbereen	Cork	2,338
Slane	Meath	1,099
Sligo	Sligo	19,402
Stamullen	Meath	2,487
Stradbally	Laois	1,056
Strandhill	Sligo	1,413
Swinford	Mayo	1,502
Swords	Dublin	33,998
Templemore	Tipperary	2,384
Thomastown	Kilkenny	1,837
Thurles	Tipperary	7,682
Tipperary	Tipperary	5,065
Tower	Cork	3,102
Tralee	Kerry	22,744
Tramore	Waterford	9,634
Trim	Meath	6,870
Tuam	Galway	6,885
Tubbercurry	Sligo	1,421
Tullamore	Offaly	12,927
Tullow	Carlow	3,048
Tullyallen	Louth	1,036
Virginia	Cavan	1,734
Waterford City and Suburbs	Waterford	49,213
Westport	Mayo	5,475
Wexford	Wexford	18,163
Wicklow	Wicklow	10,070
Youghal	Cork	6,785

== See also ==
- List of towns and villages in the Republic of Ireland
