= Urban areas in the Republic of Ireland for the 2002 census =

Return to List of towns in the Republic of Ireland

Alphabetical list of towns, together with their population as recorded by the Census of 2002. Villages with fewer than 100 people are not listed.

== A ==
Town and County	Population
Abbeyside, Waterford	218
Abbeydorney, Kerry	218
Abbeyfeale, Limerick	1683
Abbeyleix, Laois	1383
Achill Sound, Mayo	355
Adamstown, Wexford	176
Adare, Limerick	1102
Aghada-Farsid-Rostellan, Cork	774
Aglish, Waterford	193
Ahascragh, Galway	271
Allenwood, Kildare	481
Annacotty, Limerick	1342
Annagry, Donegal	247
Annascaul, Kerry	202
Ardagh, Limerick	270
Ardara, Donegal	578
Ardee, Louth	3948
Ardfert, Kerry	691
Ardfinnan, Tipperary South	779
Ardmore, Waterford	459
Ardnacrusha (Castlebank), Clare	926
Ardskeagh, Clare	149
Arklow Town, Wicklow	9993
Arvagh, Cavan	357
Ashbourne, Meath	6362
Ashford, Wicklow	1356
Askeaton, Limerick	921
Athboy, Meath	1538
Athea, Limerick	410
Athenry, Galway	2154
Athlone Town, Westmeath	15936
Athy Town, Kildare	6049
Aughrim, Wicklow	871
Avoca, Wicklow	564

== B ==
Town and County	Population
Bailieborough, Cavan	1660
Balbriggan, Fingal, Dublin	10294
Balla, Mayo	443
Ballaghaderreen, Roscommon	1416
Ballina, Mayo	9647
Ballina, Tipperary	1185
Ballinagh, Cavan	502
Ballinakill, Laois	328
Ballinamore, Leitrim	687
Ballinasloe Town, Galway	6129
Ballincar, Sligo	510
Ballindine, Mayo	297
Ballineen/Enniskean, Cork	619
Ballingarry, Limerick	348
Ballingarry, Tipperary South	314
Ballingeary, Cork	205
Ballinlough, Roscommon	254
Ballinroad, Waterford	431
Ballinrobe, Mayo	1626
Ballintra, Donegal	216
Ballisodare, Sligo	853
Ballitore, Kildare	338
Ballivor, Meath	793
Ballon, Carlow	284
Ballyagran, Limerick	185
Ballybay, Monaghan	437
Ballybay Environs, Monaghan	627
Ballybofey-Stranorlar, Donegal	3603
Ballyboghil, Fingal	313
Ballybunion, Kerry	1329
Ballycanew, Wexford	302
Ballycannan, Clare	654
Ballycastle, Mayo	249
Ballyclerahan, Tipperary South	408
Ballyclogh, Cork	208
Ballyconnell, Cavan	572
Ballycotton, Cork	425
Ballycullane, Wexford	207
Ballycumber, Offaly	248
Ballydehob, Cork	206
Ballydesmond, Cork	193
Ballyduff, Kerry	614
Ballyfarnon, Roscommon	206
Ballygar, Galway	642
Ballygeary (or Rosslare Harbour), Wexford	1038
Ballyhack, Wexford	210
Ballyhaise, Cavan	530
Ballyhaunis, Mayo	1381
Ballyheigue, Kerry	626
Ballyhooly, Cork	179
Ballyjamesduff, Cavan	871
Ballylanders, Limerick	333
Ballyliffin, Donegal	313
Ballylinan, Laois	430
Ballylongford, Kerry	405
Ballymahon, Longford	827
Ballymakeery, Cork	337
Ballymore, Westmeath	239
Ballymore Eustace, Kildare	786
Ballymote, Sligo	981
Ballymulcashel, Clare	255
Ballynacargy, Westmeath	260
Ballyoulster, Kildare	411
Ballyporeen, Tipperary South	295
Ballyragget, Kilkenny	821
Ballyroan, Laois	142
Ballyroe, Kildare	151
Ballysax, Kildare	170
Ballyshannon, Donegal	2715
Ballysimon, Wexford	217
Ballyvaughan, Clare	201
Balreask, Meath	221
Baltimore, Cork	383
Baltinglass, Wicklow	1260
Baltray, Louth	120
Banagher, Offaly	1553
Bandon, Cork	5051
Bangor Erris, Mayo	266
Bansha, Tipperary South	302
Banteer, Cork	327
Bantry, Cork	3150
Barntown, Wexford	394
Beaufort, Kerry	159
Bellanode, Monaghan	330
Belmont, Offaly	252
Belmullet, Mayo	952
Belturbet, Cavan	1295
Bennettsbridge, Kilkenny	735
Birr, Offaly	4436
Blacklion, Cavan	166
Blarney, Cork	2146
Blessington, Wicklow	2509
Boherbue, Cork	379
Borris, Carlow	580
Borris-in-Ossory, Laois	379
Borrisokane	832
Borrisoleigh, Tipperary North	598
Boyle, Roscommon	2205
Bracknagh, Offaly	259
Bray, Wicklow	30951
Bridebridge, Cork	214
Bridge End, Donegal	298
Bridgetown, Wexford	183
Brinlack, Donegal	381
Brittas, South Dublin	174
Broadford, Limerick	300
Brosna, Kerry	204
Brownstown, Kildare	500
Bruff, Limerick	695
Bruree, Limerick	299
Bunbeg-Derrybeg, Donegal	1388
Bunclody-Carrickduff, Carlow and Wexford	1361
Buncrana Town, Donegal	5271
Bundoran Town, Donegal	1842
Burnfoot, Donegal	240
Burtonport, Donegal	346
Butlersbridge, Cavan	182
Buttevant, Cork	987

== C ==
Town and County	Population
Cabragh, Monaghan	201
Caherconlish, Limerick	616
Cahir, Tipperary South	2794
Cahersiveen, Kerry	10234
Callan, Kilkenny	1325
Camolin, Wexford	320
Campile, Wexford	335
Cappamore, Limerick	684
Cappawhite, Tipperary South	340
Cappoquin, Waterford	756
Carlingford, Louth	604
Carlow Town, Carlow	18487
Carndonagh, Donegal	1673
Carnew, Wicklow	809
Carragh, Kildare	242
Carraroe, Galway	629
Carrick, Donegal	245
Carrickmacross Town, Monaghan	3832
Carrick-on-Shannon, Leitrim and Roscommon	2237
Carrick-on-Suir Town, Tipperary South	5586
Carrigaline, Cork	11191
Carrigallen, Leitrim	257
Carrigans, Donegal	158
Carrigtwohill, Cork	1411
Carrowkeel, Donegal	253
Cashel Town, Tipperary South	2770
Castlebar Town, Mayo	11371
Castlebellingham/Kilsaran, Louth	721
Castleblayney Town, Monaghan	2936
Castlebridge, Wexford	1013
Castlecomer-Donaguile, Kilkenny	1482
Castleconnell, Limerick	1343
Castledermot, Kildare	726
Castle Ellis, Wexford	165
Castlefin, Donegal	783
Castlegregory, Kerry	186
Castleisland, Kerry	2162
Castlelyons, Cork	211
Castlemartyr, Cork	577
Castlepollard, Westmeath	895
Castlerea, Roscommon	2689
Castletown, Laois	289
Castletownbere, Cork	875
Castletownroche, Cork	423
Castletownshend, Cork	157
Causeway, Kerry	251
Cavan Town, Cavan	6098
Ceannanus Mór (formerly Kells) Town, Meath	4421
Celbridge, Kildare	16016
Charlestown-Bellahy, Mayo and Sligo	753
Cheekpoint, Waterford	325
Churchbay, Cork	270
Clane, Kildare	4417
Clara, Offaly	2704
Claregalway, Galway	562
Claremorris, Mayo	2101
Clarinbridge, Galway	173
Clashmore, Waterford	161
Clifden, Galway	1355
Cliffoney, Sligo	327
Cloghan, Offaly	523
Clogh-Chatsworth, Kilkenny	320
Clogheen, Tipperary South	550
Clogherhead, Louth	906
Clonakilty Town, Cork	3698
Clonard, Meath	248
Clonaslee, Laois	538
Clonbullogue, Offaly	390
Clonee Village, Meath	173
Clonegal, Carlow and Wexford	193
Clones Town, Monaghan	1947
Clongeen, Wexford	224
Clonlara, Clare	472
Clonmany, Donegal	393
Clonmel Borough, Tipperary South	16910
Clonmellon, Westmeath	403
Clonroche, Wexford	339
Clontuskert, Roscommon	236
Cloonboo, Galway	351
Cloughjordan, Tipperary North	431
Cloyne, Cork	785
Coachford, Cork	412
Cobh Town, Cork	9801
Coill Dubh (or Blackwood), Kildare	592
Collinstown, Westmeath	229
Collon, Louth	424
Collooney, Sligo	619
Cong, Galway and Mayo	185
Conna, Cork	258
Convoy, Donegal	1028
Coolagary, Offaly	241
Coolaney, Sligo	167
Coolgreany, Wexford	398
Coonagh, Limerick	222
Cootehill, Cavan	1744
Cork City, Cork	186239
Corofin, Clare	382
Courtmacsherry, Cork	259
Courtown Harbour, Wexford	502
Cratloe, Clare	656
Craughwell, Galway	358
Creeslough, Donegal	304
Crocknamurleog, Donegal	346
Cromane, Kerry	125
Crookstown, Cork	320
Croom, Limerick	1056
Crosshaven, Cork	1373
Crossmolina, Mayo	935
Culdaff, Donegal	182

== D ==
Town and County	Population
Daingean, Offaly	777
Danescastle, Wexford	168
Delvin, Westmeath	1000
Derrinturn, Kildare	791
Dingle, Kerry	5281
Donabate, Fingal	3854
Donard, Wicklow	201
Donegal, Donegal	2453
Doneraile, Cork	800
Donore, Meath	334
Doon, Limerick	407
Doonbeg, Clare	206
Drimoleague, Cork	363
Drogheda Borough, Louth	31020
Droichead Nua (formerly Newbridge), Kildare	16739
Dromahair, Leitrim	312
Dromina, Cork	190
Dromiskin, Louth	949
Drommahane, Cork	548
Dromcolliher, Limerick	496
Drumconrath, Meath	389
Drumkeeran, Leitrim	242
Drumlish, Longford	277
Drumshanbo, Leitrim	623
Drumsna, Leitrim	173
Dublin, Dublin	1045000
Duleek, Meath	2173
Dunboyne, Meath	5363
Duncannon, Wexford	303
Duncormick, Wexford	501
Dundalk Town, Louth	32505
Dundrum, Tipperary South	191
Dunfanaghy, Donegal	293
Dungarvan Town, Waterford	7452
Dungloe, Donegal	946
Dunkineely, Donegal	353
Dunlavin, Wicklow	814
Dunleer, Louth	1014
Dunmanway, Cork	1532
Dunmore, Galway	594
Dunmore East, Waterford	1750
Dunshaughlin, Meath	3063
Durrow, Laois	717
Durrus, Cork	283

== E ==
Town and County	Population
Easky, Sligo	211
Edenderry, Offaly	4559
Elphin, Roscommon	527
Emly, Tipperary South	278
Emo, Laois	220
Emyvale, Monaghan	583
Enfield, Meath	1072
Ennis Town, Clare	22051
Enniscorthy Town, Wexford	8964
Enniskerry, Wicklow	1904
Ennistymon, Clare	881
Eyrecourt, Galway	354

== F ==
Town and County	Population
Fahan, Donegal	338
Falcarragh (or Cross Roads), Donegal	852
Farran, Cork	368
Feakle, Clare	149
Fenit, Kerry	433
Ferbane, Offaly	1198
Fermoy Town, Cork	4804
Ferns, Wexford	985
Fethard, Tipperary South	1388
Fethard-on-Sea, Wexford	302
Ford, Wexford	378
Fountainstown, Cork	852
Foxford, Mayo	878
Foynes, Limerick	491
Frenchpark, Roscommon	358
Freshford, Kilkenny	756
Furbogh, Galway	319

== G ==
Town and County	Population
Galbally, Limerick	235
Galway City, Galway	72000
Carrigkerry, Limerick	173
Garristown, Fingal	289
Geashill, Offaly	344
Glanworth, Cork	378
Glassan, Westmeath	216
Glasslough, Monaghan	296
Glen, Limerick	216
Glenamaddy, Galway	457
Glenbeigh, Kerry	330
Glencolumbkille, Donegal	254
Glencullen, Dún Laoghaire–Rathdown, Dublin	204
Glenealy, Wicklow	377
Glenties, Donegal	789
Glin, Limerick	560
Gneevgullia, Kerry	239
Golden, Tipperary South	268
Goresbridge, Kilkenny	401
Gorey, Wexford	5282
Gormanston, Meath	504
Gort, Galway	1776
Gortahork, Donegal	155
Gortnahoo, Tipperary South	207
Gowran, Kilkenny	454
Grahormac, Wexford	162
Graiguenamanagh- Tinnahinch, Carlow and Kilkenny	1435
Granard, Longford	1013
Grange, Sligo	225
Grangemore, Kildare	171
Greencastle, Donegal	570
Greystones, Wicklow	11913
Gurteen, Sligo	250

== H ==
Town and County	Population
Hacketstown, Carlow	614
Headford, Galway	703
Holycross, Tipperary North, and Tipperary South	610
Hospital, Limerick	1206

== I ==
Town and County	Population
Inchigeelagh, Cork	157
Inistioge, Kilkenny	266
Inniscrone, Sligo	668
Innishannon, Cork	679
Inniskeen, Monaghan	310

== J ==
Town and County	Population
Jenkinstown, Louth	263
Johnstown, Kildare	211
Johnstown, Kilkenny	517
Julianstown/Whitecross, Meath	422

== K ==
Town and County	Population
Kanturk, Cork	1651
Keadew, Roscommon	194
Keel-Dooagh, Mayo	541
Keenagh, Longford	225
Kells, Kilkenny	176
Kenmare, Kerry	1844
Kentstown, Meath	355
Kernanstown, Carlow	244
Kilbeggan, Westmeath	652
Kilberry, Kildare	417
Kilcar, Donegal	262
Kilcloon, Meath	309
Kilcock, Kildare	2740
Kilcoole, Wicklow	2826
Kilcormac (or Frankford), Offaly	879
Kilcullen, Kildare	1483
Kildalkey, Meath	137
Kildare, Kildare	5694
Kildorrery, Cork	215
Kildrum, Donegal	267
Kildysart, Clare	271
Kilfenora, Clare	128
Kilfinane, Limerick	779
Kilgarvan, Kerry	156
Kilkee, Clare	1260
Kilkelly, Mayo	230
Kilkenny Borough, Kilkenny	20735
Kilkishen, Clare	324
Kill, Kildare	2246
Kill, Waterford	173
Killala, Mayo	650
Killaloe, Clare	1174
Killarney Town, Kerry	26992
Killavullen, Cork	224
Killeagh, Cork	426
Killeigh, Offaly	183
Killenaule, Tipperary South	715
Killeshandra, Cavan	417
Killimor, Galway	345
Killorglin, Kerry	1359
Killucan-Rathwire, Westmeath	575
Killumney, Cork	522
Killybegs, Donegal	1396
Killygordan, Donegal	399
Kilmacanogue, Wicklow	834
Kilmacow, Kilkenny	566
Kilmacrennan, Donegal	430
Kilmacthomas, Waterford	717
Kilmaine, Mayo	184
Kilmainham, Meath	237
Kilmallock, Limerick	1362
Kilmeage, Kildare	436
Kilmessan, Meath	292
Kilmihill, Clare	325
Kilmoganny, Kilkenny	236
Kilmore Quay, Wexford	417
Kilnaleck, Cavan	305
Kilpedder, Wicklow	517
Kilrane, Wexford	309
Kilronan, Galway	270
Kilrush Town, Clare	2699
Kilsheelan, Tipperary South	497
Kiltimagh, Mayo	1000
Kilworth, Cork	427
Kingscourt, Cavan	1307
Kinlough, Leitrim	335
Kinnegad, Westmeath	1296
Kinnitty, Offaly	226
Kinsale Town, Cork	3554
Kinsealy-Drinan, Fingal	2110
Kinvara, Galway	447
Knightstown, Kerry	172
Knock, Mayo	595
Knockbridge, Louth	335
Knockglass, Cork	239
Knocklong, Limerick	204
Knocknagree, Cork	204

== L ==
Town and County	Population
Lackaghbeg, Galway	220
Ladytown, Kildare	242
Laghy (Laghey), Donegal	174
Lahinch, Clare	625
Lanesborough-Ballyleague, Longford and Roscommon	943
Lawcus, Kilkenny	273
Laragh, Wicklow	357
Laytown-Bettystown-Mornington, Meath	5597
Leap, Cork	160
Leighlinbridge, Carlow	646
Leixlip, Kildare	15016
Lemybrien, Waterford	210
Letterkenny Town, Donegal	15231
Lifford, Donegal	1395
Limerick City, Limerick	86998
Liscannor, Clare	108
Liscarroll, Cork	256
Lisdoonvarna, Clare	822
Lismore, Waterford	1182
Listowel Town, Kerry	3999
Littleton, Tipperary North	500
Lixnaw, Kerry	248
Longford Town, Longford	7557
Longwood, Meath	480
Loughanure, Donegal	312
Loughglinn, Roscommon	182
Loughrea, Galway	4004
Loughshinny, Fingal	663
Louisburgh, Mayo	207
Louth, Louth	514
Lusk, Fingal	2456

== M ==
Town and County	Population
Macroom Town, Cork	2985
Maddenstown, Kildare	179
Malahide, Fingal	13826
Mallow Town, Cork	8937
Manorcunningham, Donegal	320
Manorhamilton, Leitrim	927
Maynooth, Kildare	10151
Meathas Truim (or Edgeworthstown), Longford	726
Meenlaragh, Donegal	430
Midleton Town, Cork	7957
Milford, Cork	204
Milford, Donegal	793
Millstreet, Cork	1289
Milltown, Kerry	332
Milltown, Kildare	271
Milltown Malbay, Clare	562
Mitchelstown, Cork	3300
Moate, Westmeath	1520
Model Village (or Dripsey), Cork	295
Mohill, Leitrim	786
Monaghan Town, Monaghan	5936
Monasterevin, Kildare	2583
Moneenroe, Kilkenny	678
Moneygall, Offaly	291
Monivea, Galway	300
Mooncoin, Kilkenny	854
Moroe, Limerick	464
Mount Bellew, Galway	667
Mountcharles, Donegal	432
Mountcollins, Limerick	230
Mountmellick, Laois	3359
Mountrath, Laois	1331
Moville, Donegal	1465
Moycullen, Galway	883
Moylough, Galway	236
Mucklagh, Offaly	521
Muff, Donegal	773
Muinebeag (formerly Bagenalstown), Carlow	2728
Mullagh, Cavan	479
Mullaghmore, Sligo	137
Mullinahone, Tipperary South	348
Mullinavat, Kilkenny	309
Mullingar, Westmeath	15621
Multyfarnham, Westmeath	153
Mungret, Limerick	248
Murntown, Wexford	243

== N ==
Town and County	Population
Naas Town, Kildare	18288
Naul, County Dublin	215
Navan (An Uaimh) Town, Meath	19417
Nenagh Town, Tipperary North	6454
Newbawn, Wexford	169
Newbliss, Monaghan	270
Newcastle West, Limerick	4017
Newcastle, County Dublin	1160
Newcastle, Tipperary South	201
Newcastle, Wicklow	851
Newmarket, Cork	1055
Newmarket-on-Fergus, Clare	1496
Newport, Mayo	527
Newport, County Tipperary	887
New Ross Town, Wexford	6537
Newtown, Cork	224
Newtown, Laois	245
Newtowncunningham, Donegal	663
Newtownforbes, Longford	561
Newtownmountkennedy, Wicklow	2521
Newtownsandes, Kerry	326
Nobber, Meath	245
Nurney, Kildare	239

== O ==
Town and County	Population
O'Briensbridge-Montpelier, Clare and Limerick	375
Oilgate, Wexford	265
Oldcastle, Meath	937
Omeath, Louth	231
Oldtown, Fingal	162
Oola, Limerick	391
Oranmore, Galway	1692
Oughterard, Galway	1209

== P ==
Town and County	Population
Pallas Green, Limerick	368
Pallaskenry, Limerick	550
Passage East, Waterford	636
Passage West, Cork	4595
Patrickswell, Limerick	998
Paulstown, Kilkenny	292
Pettigo (pt.) (a), Donegal	275
Piercetown, Wexford	471
Piltown, Kilkenny	778
Portarlington, Laois and Offaly	4001
Portlaoise (formerly Maryborough), Laois	15037
Portlaw, Waterford	1183
Portmarnock, Fingal	8376
Portrane, Fingal	1726
Portroe, Tipperary North	401
Portumna, Galway	1235
Prosperous, Kildare	1523
Puckaun, Tipperary North	269

== Q ==
Town and County	Population
Quilty, Clare	234
Quin, Clare	427

== R ==
Town and County	Population
Raharney, Westmeath	232
Ramelton, Donegal	1051
Rannafast, Donegal	279
Raphoe, Donegal	949
Rathangan, Kildare	1811
Rathard, Cork	172
Rathcoole, South Dublin	2499
Rathcormac, Cork	429
Rathdowney, Laois	1111
Rathdrum, Wicklow	1387
Rathkeale, Limerick	1362
Rathluirc (or Charleville), Cork	6685
Rathmolyon, Meath	194
Rathmore, Kerry	450
Rathmullan, Donegal	514
Rathnew, Wicklow	1441
Rathvilly, Carlow	500
Ratoath, Meath	3794
Reardnogy, Tipperary North	159
Rhode, Offaly	705
Ring, Waterford	332
Ringaskiddy (or Loughbeg), Cork	407
Rivermeade, Fingal	558
Riverstown, Sligo	273
Robertstown, Kildare	375
Rochfortbridge, Westmeath	1382
Rockcorry, Monaghan	287
Roosky, Leitrim and Roscommon	198
Roscommon, Roscommon	4489
Roscrea, Tipperary North	4578
Rosscarbery, Cork	437
Rosses Point, Sligo	774
Rosslare, Wexford	1145
Roundstone, Galway	239
Roundwood, Wicklow	518
Rush, Fingal	6769

== S ==
Town and County	Population
Saggart, South Dublin	588
St. Johnston, Donegal	470
Sallins, Kildare	2922
Scarriff, Clare	807
Schull, Cork	693
Scotstown, Monaghan	220
Shanagarry, Cork	291
Shanagolden, Limerick	373
Shannon, Clare	8228
Shannon Environs, Clare	333
Shannonbridge, Offaly	248
Shercock, Cavan	454
Shillelagh, Wicklow	278
Shinrone, Offaly	488
Shrule, Mayo	326
Silvermines, Tipperary North	257
Sixmilebridge, Clare	1327
Skerries, Fingal	9149
Skibbereen Town, Cork	2000
Slane, Meath	823
Slieverue, Kilkenny	461
Sligo Borough, Sligo	19735
Smithborough, Monaghan	240
Sneem, Kerry	285
Spa, Kerry	424
Spiddle, Galway	190
Stamullen, Meath	779
Stradbally, Laois	1178
Stradbally, Waterford	298
Stratford-on-Slaney, Wicklow	151
Straffan, Kildare	332
Strandhill, Sligo	1002
Strokestown, Roscommon	631
Summerhill, Meath	668
Suncroft, Kildare	498
Swanlinbar, Cavan	223
Swinford, Mayo	1497
Swords, Fingal	27175

== T ==
Town and County	Population
Taghmon, Wexford	625
Tallanstown, Louth	443
Tallow, Waterford	845
Tarbert, Kerry	548
Templemore Town, Tipperary North	2270
Templetuohy, Tipperary North	325
Termonfeckin, Louth	503
Thomastown, Kilkenny	1600
Thurles Town, Tipperary North	7425
Tievebane, Donegal	267
Timoleague, Cork	323
Tinahely, Wicklow	692
Tinriland, Carlow	371
Tinure, Louth	296
Tipperary Town, Tipperary South	4964
Toomevara, Tipperary North	321
Tower, Cork	3032
Tralee Town, Kerry	21987
Tramore, Waterford	8115
Tramore Environs, Waterford	190
Trim Town, Meath	5894
Tuam, Galway	5847
Tubbercurry, Sligo	1171
Tulla, Clare	414
Tullamore Town, Offaly	11098
Tullow, Carlow	2417
Tullyallen, Louth	617
Two-Mile Borris, Tipperary North	474
Tyrrellspass, Westmeath	443

== U ==
Town and County	Population
Union Hall, Cork	202
Urlingford, Kilkenny	739

== V ==
Town and County	Population
Villierstown, Waterford	192
Virginia, Cavan	1093

== W ==
Town and County	Population
Waterford City, Waterford	46736
Watergrasshill, Cork	386
Waterville-Spunkane, Kerry	538
Westport, Mayo	5634
Wexford Borough, Wexford	17235
Whitegate, Cork	440
Whitegate, Clare	193
Wicklow Town, Wicklow	9355
Woodford, Galway	280

== Y ==
Town and County	Population
Youghal, Cork	6577
