= Kinsealy–Drinan =

Neighbourhood in Dublin, Ireland

Kinsealy–Drinan Cionn Sáile–Draighneán
- Urban area in County Dublin
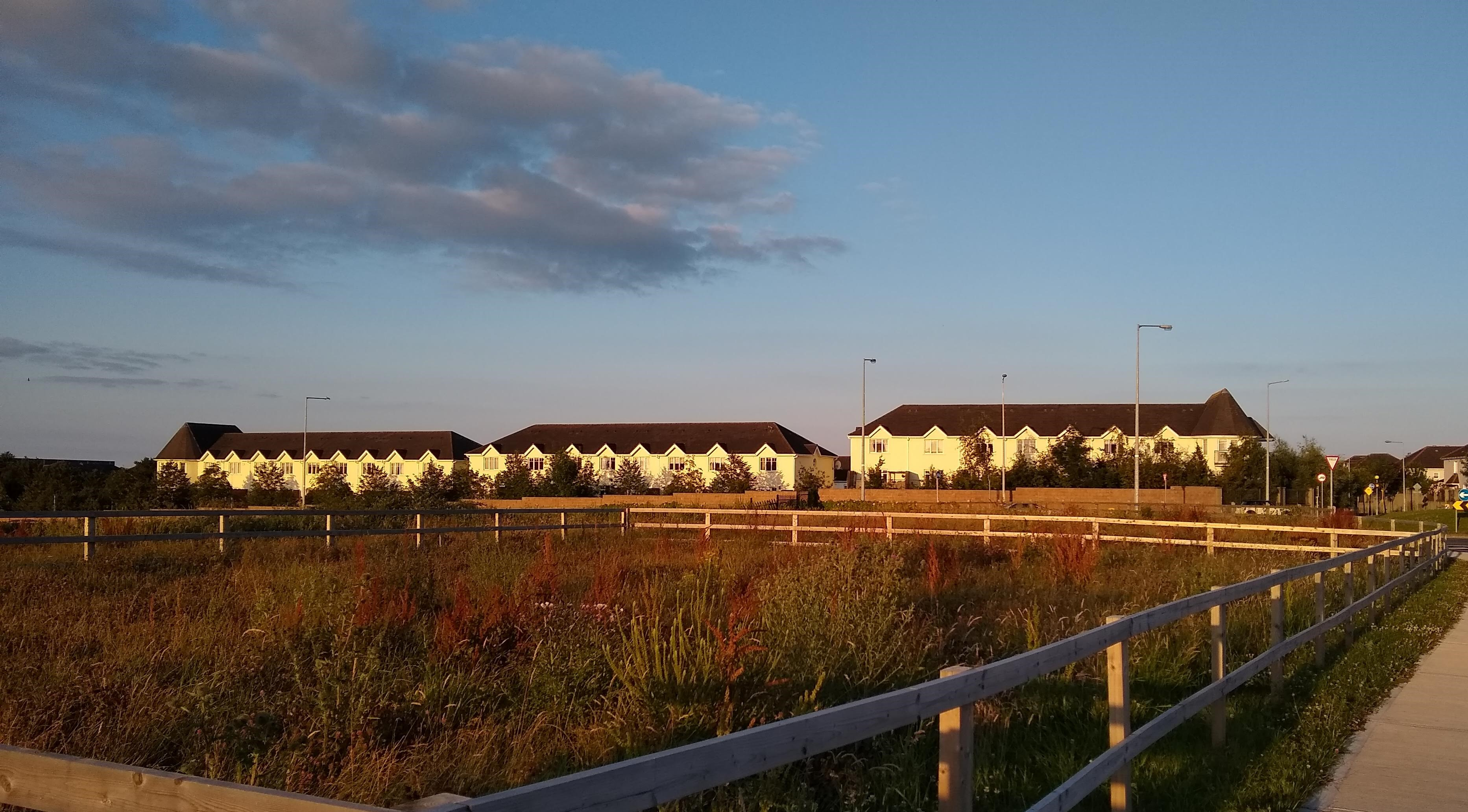
- Holywell, a housing development in Kinsealy–Drinan

- Location in Dublin area
- Coordinates: 53°26′36″N 6°12′37″W
- Country: Ireland
- Province: Leinster
- County: County Dublin
- Local government area: Fingal

Government
  - Dáil constituency: Dublin Fingal East
  - EU Parliament: Dublin

Population (2022)
  - Total: 7,526
- Time zone: UTC+0 (WET)
  - Summer (DST): UTC-1 (IST (WEST))
- Area code: 01, +353 1

Kinsealy–Drinan (Irish: Cionn Sáile–Draighneán) is an urban area in County Dublin near Swords, Ireland.

Kinsealy–Drinan
Year	Pop.	±%
1986	1,095	—
1991	2,084	+90.3%
1996	2,182	+4.7%
2002	2,110	−3.3%
2006	3,651	+73.0%
2011	5,814	+59.2%
2016	6,643	+14.3%
2022	7,526	+13.3%

The main business and industrial areas to the east of Swords along the R132 dual carriageway separate the town centre of Swords, and its western suburbs, from the residential neighbourhoods further east — Seatown, Lissenhall, Holywell and Drynam (or Drinan) — for which reason the Central Statistics Office treats the latter areas as forming a separate census town, which since 1991 it has dubbed "Kinsealy–Drinan". The development plan for Fingal County Council treats Kinsealy–Drinan as part of Swords.

== Holywell ==
Holywell, a housing development in the area, was developed in phases and marketed under various names, including Feltrim Hall, Gorse Hill, Abbey Stone, Holywell and The Meadows. All the street names in the development include the common name Holywell e.g. Holywell Drive. It is the eastern part of Kinsealy–Drinan, separated from the western part by the M1 motorway. Holywell is located to the south-east of Swords, on the west side of the motorway. The Swords junction, off the M1, serves the estate. The name Holywell is related to a "holy well" which is located nearby.

Founded in 2004, the community grew rapidly over its first four years. While the development of social and recreational facilities initially lagged behind the development of housing, from 2008 onwards a small commercial centre, primary school, sports facilities and community centre were opened. In 2017, a retail park was constructed adjacent to the estate, anchored by a Tesco store.

== Transport ==
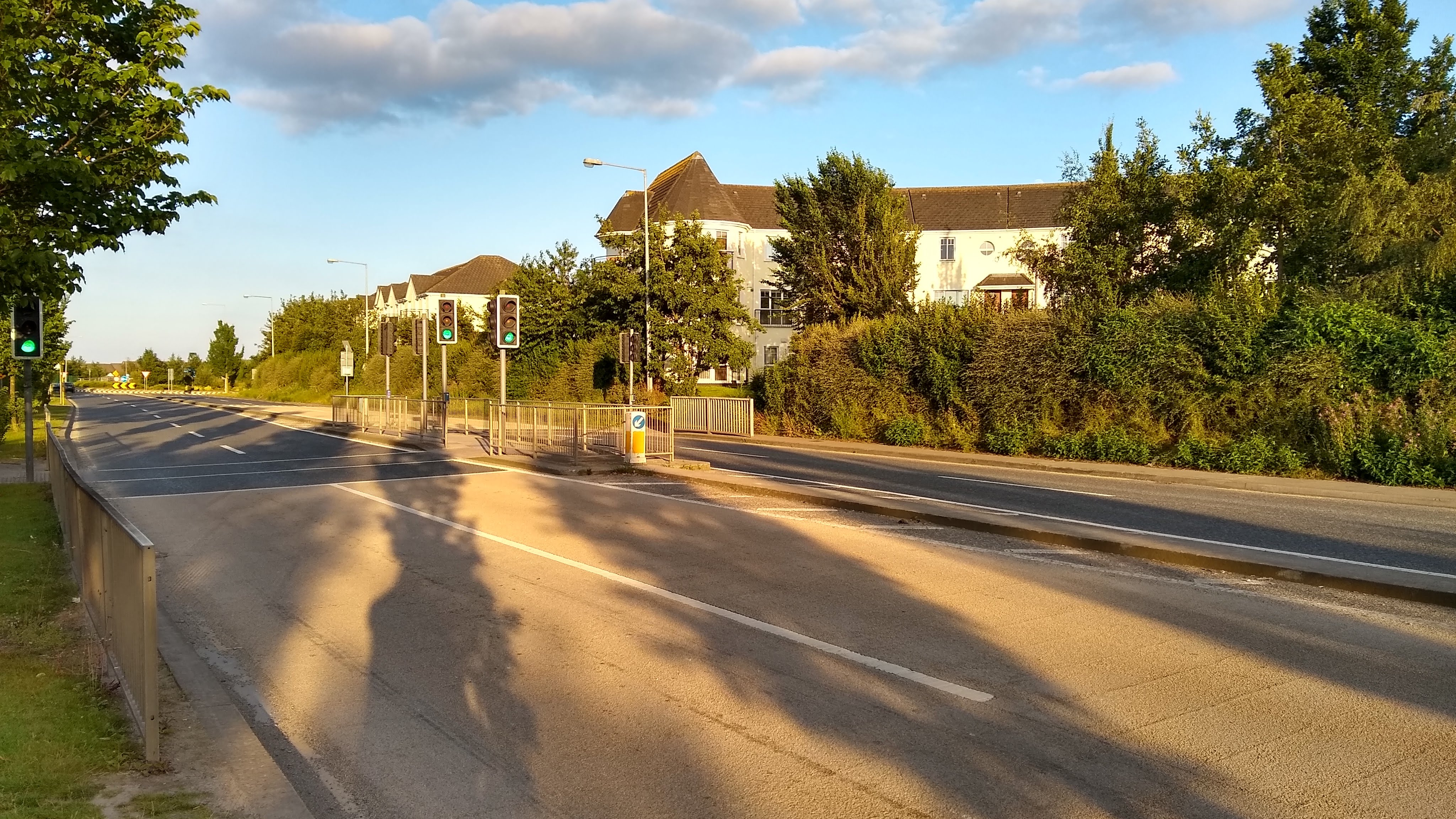
The R125 passes through Holywell

Kinsealy–Drinan is adjacent to the M1 motorway. The R125 dual carriageway also passes through the area.

The Swords Express bus service serves Holywell. The area is also served by Dublin Bus routes 41x and 142. Route 41x operates from Swords Manor to UCD Belfield via Holywell, Dublin Port Tunnel and Dublin City Centre. It serves Holywell in the morning peak only. Route 142 operates from Portmarnock to Rathmines/UCD via Malahide, Holywell, Dublin Port Tunnel and Dublin City Centre.

Dublin Bus route 43 and Go-Ahead Ireland route 102 also stop nearby on Montgorry Way. Route 102, which operates from Dublin Airport to Sutton, also has a stop nearby.
