= Ballybofey and Stranorlar =

Built up area in County Donegal, Ireland

- Built up area
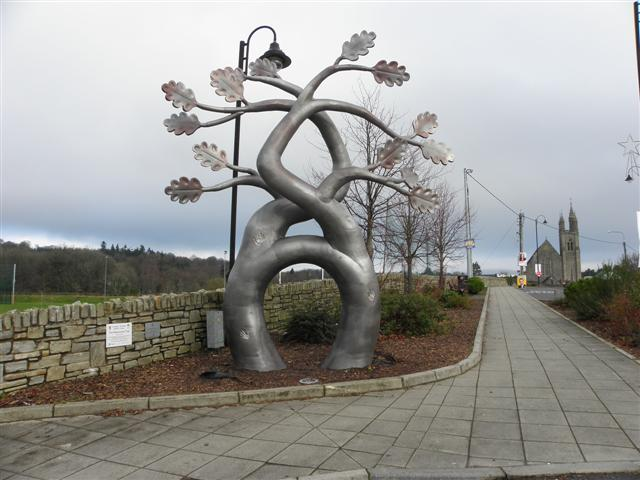
- Matrimonial Tree, Ballybofey

- Location within Ireland
- Coordinates: 54°48′06″N 7°46′30″W
- Country: Ireland
- Province: Ulster
- County: County Donegal

Population (2022)
  - Total: 5,406
- Time zone: UTC±0 (WET)
  - Summer (DST): UTC+1 (IST)

Ballybofey–Stranorlar is a built up area in County Donegal, Ireland, comprising the towns of Ballybofey and Stranorlar, which face each other across the River Finn.

Historical population
Year	Pop.	±%
2002	3,603	—
2016	4,852	+34.7%
2022	5,406	+11.4%

Ballybofey and Stranorlar can be seen from MacCumhaill Park, where Donegal plays home matches.

They are sometimes colloquially referred to as the "Twin Towns".
