= Inch (disambiguation) =

An inch is a unit of measurement.

Inch or inches may also refer to

== Units ==
- Inch as a measurement of rain, as measured by a rain gauge
- Inch of mercury, a unit of pressure
- Inch of water, a unit of pressure
- Scottish inch, a Scottish unit of measurement
- Column inch, a unit of publication measurement
- Gear inches, a measure of bicycle gearing
- Miner's inch, a unit of flow
- Pyramid inch, a unit used by pyramidologists

== Places ==
"Inch" in Scottish and Irish placenames (an anglicisation of the Gaelic innis) usually meaning an island (often an islet) or meadow:

Ireland

- Inch, County Clare, a village
- Inch, County Cork, a village
- Inch, County Kerry, a coastal settlement
- Inch, County Laois, a townland
- Inch, County Wexford, a village
- Inch, County Wicklow, a civil parish in County Wicklow
- Inch, Inch, a townland in the parish of the same name in County Tipperary
- Inches, County Cork, a townland
- Inch Island, County Donegal
- The Inch, Dublin, a cricket ground in Fingal, Ireland

New Zealand

- Inch Valley, a locality near Otago

Northern Ireland

- Inch, County Down, a townland in County Down
- Inch Abbey, a ruined monastic site in County Down

Scotland

- Alloa Inch, an island in the tidal reaches of the River Forth near Alloa
- Inch, Dumfries and Galloway, a civil parish in Dumfries and Galloway
- The Inch, Edinburgh, a suburb of southern Edinburgh
- Inch, an islet off St Mary's Isle Priory in Dumfries and Galloway
- Inch Kenneth, an islet off the west coast of the Isle of Mull
- North Inch and South Inch, public parks in Perth
- St Serf's Inch, an island in Loch Leven

=== See also ===
- Insch, a town in Aberdeenshire, Scotland
- Insh, a village in the Highland Council Area of Scotland

== People with the surname ==
- Richard Inch (1843–1911), an American admiral
- Adam Inch (1857–1933), a Scottish-Canadian farmer and politician
- Robert Alexander Inch (1873–1961), an American judge
- Thomas Inch (1881–1963), British "strongest man"

== Other ==
- USS Inch (DE-146), an American naval ship
- Big Inch, a 1942 American oil pipeline
- Inches, a gay monthly publication established by George W. Mavety
- Inches (album), a music album by Les Savy Fav
- Inch (band), a 90s pop-punk band from San Diego

== See also ==
- , including islands starting with "Inch"
- Insh (disambiguation)
- Inch House, Edinburgh, Scotland
- H. Augustus and Agnes Cleveland O'Dell House, Michigan, Scotland
