= List of towns and villages in the Republic of Ireland =

This is a link page for cities, towns and villages in the Republic of Ireland, including townships or urban centres in Dublin, Cork, Limerick, Galway, Waterford and other major urban areas. Cities are shown in bold; see City status in Ireland for an independent list.

== A ==
- Abbeydorney
- Abbeyfeale
- Abbeyknockmoy
- Abbeylara
- Abbeyleix
- Abbeyshrule
- Abbeyside
- Achill Sound (Gob a' Choire)
- Achonry
- Aclare
- Adamstown (Dublin)
- Adamstown (Wexford)
- Adare
- Adrigole
- Affane
- Aghaboe
- Aghabullogue
- Aghada
- Aghamore
- Agher
- Aglish
- Ahakista
- Annacurra
- Ahascragh
- Aherla
- Ahiohill
- Allen
- Allenwood
- Allihies
- Anglesboro
- Annacotty
- Annagassan
- Annagry (Anagaire)
- Annamoe
- Annascaul
- Annestown
- Annyalla
- Ardagh (Limerick)
- Ardagh (Longford)
- Ardara
- Ardcroney
- Ardee
- Ardfert
- Ardfield
- Ardgroom
- Ardmore
- Ardpatrick
- Ardrahan
- Ardsallis
- Arigna
- Arklow
- Arless
- Artane
- Arthurstown
- Arvagh
- Asdee
- Ashbourne
- Ashford
- Askeaton
- Askill
- Athboy
- Athea
- Athenry
- Athgarvan
- Athlacca
- Athleague
- Athlone
- Athy
- Attymass
- Attymon
- Aughagower
- Aughleam (Eachléim)
- Aughrim (Galway)
- Aughrim (Wicklow)
- Avoca

== B ==
- Bagenalstown (Muine Bheag)
- Bailieborough
- Balbriggan
- Baldoyle
- Balgriffin
- Balla
- Ballaghaderreen
- Ballaghmore
- Balally
- Ballickmoyler
- Ballina (Mayo)
- Ballina (Tipperary)
- Ballinaclash
- Ballinacurra
- Ballinadee
- Ballinagar
- Ballinagh
- Ballinaglera
- Ballinagree
- Ballinakill
- Ballinalee
- Ballinamore
- Ballinascarty
- Ballinasloe
- Ballincollig
- Ballindaggin
- Ballinderreen
- Ballindine
- Ballindooley
- Ballinea
- Ballineen and Enniskean
- Ballingarry (Limerick)
- Ballingarry (Tipperary)
- Ballingeary (Béal Átha an Ghaorthaidh)
- Ballingurteen
- Ballinhassig
- Ballinkillin
- Ballinlough
- Ballinode
- Ballinroad
- Ballinrobe
- Ballinskelligs (Baile an Sceilg)
- Ballinspittle
- Ballinteer
- Ballintemple
- Ballintra
- Ballintober (Roscommon)
- Ballintogher
- Ballintubber (Mayo)
- Ballitore
- Ballivor
- Ballon
- Ballsbridge
- Ballybay
- Ballybeggan
- Ballyboden
- Ballybofey
- Ballybough
- Ballybrack
- Ballybrittas
- Ballybrophy
- Ballybunion
- Ballycanew
- Ballycarney
- Ballycastle
- Ballycolla
- Ballyconnell
- Ballyconneely
- Ballycotton
- Ballycroy
- Ballycullane
- Ballycullen
- Ballycumber
- Ballydavid (Baile na nGall)
- Ballydehob
- Ballydesmond
- Ballyduff (Kerry)
- Ballyduff (Waterford)
- Ballyduff (Wexford)
- Ballyedmond
- Ballyfarnan
- Ballyfermot
- Ballyferriter (Baile an Fheirtéaraigh)
- Ballyfin
- Ballyforan
- Ballygarrett
- Ballygarvan
- Ballygawley
- Ballyhack
- Ballyhaise
- Ballyhale
- Ballyhaunis
- Ballyhea
- Ballyheigue
- Ballyhide
- Ballyhuppahane
- Ballyjamesduff
- Ballykeeran
- Ballyknockan
- Ballylanders
- Ballylaneen
- Ballyleague
- Ballylickey
- Ballyliffin
- Ballylongford
- Ballylooby
- Ballylinan
- Ballymacward
- Ballymagauran
- Ballymahon
- Ballymakeera (Baile Mhic Íre)
- Ballymascanlan
- Ballymoe
- Ballymore (Cork)
- Ballymore (Westmeath)
- Ballymore Eustace
- Ballymote
- Ballymount
- Ballymun
- Ballymurphy
- Ballynacally
- Ballynacargy
- Ballynacregga
- Ballynahinch
- Ballynahown (Baile na hAbhann)
- Ballynanty
- Ballyogan
- Ballyporeen
- Ballyragget
- Ballyroan
- Ballysadare
- Ballysaggart
- Ballyshannon
- Ballysloe
- Ballyvary
- Ballyvaughan
- Ballyvourney (Baile Bhuirne)
- Ballywilliam
- Balscadden
- Baltimore
- Baltinglass
- Banagher
- Bandon
- Bangor Erris
- Bannow
- Bansha
- Banteer
- Bantry
- Barefield
- Barleycove
- Barna (Bearna)
- Barnane
- Barndarrig
- Barrowhouse
- Bartlemy
- Batterstown
- Bawnboy
- Bayside
- Bealadangan (Béal a' Daingin)
- Bective
- Bekan
- Belcarra
- Belclare
- Belderrig (Béal Deirg)
- Belfield
- Belgooly
- Bellanagare
- Bellanamullia
- Bellavary
- Bellewstown
- Belmullet (Béal an Mhuirthead)
- Belturbet
- Belvelly
- Bennettsbridge
- Bettystown
- Binghamstown
- Birdhill
- Birr
- Bishopstown
- Blacklion
- Blackpool
- Blackrock (Dublin)
- Blackrock (Dundalk)
- Blackrock (Cork)
- Blackwater
- Blanchardstown
- Blarney
- Blennerville
- Blessington
- Blue Ball
- Boherbue
- Bohola
- Bonniconllon
- Boolavogue
- Booterstown
- Borris
- Borris-in-Ossory
- Borrisokane
- Bree
- Borrisoleigh
- Boston
- Bouladuff
- Boyerstown
- Boyle
- Bracknagh
- Brandon (Cé Bhréannain)
- Bray
- Breaffy
- Brickens
- Bridgend
- Bridgetown
- Brittas
- Broadford (Clare)
- Broadford (Limerick)
- Broadstone
- Broadway
- Brosna (Kerry)
- Brosna (Offaly)
- Bruckless
- Bruff
- Buckode
- Bullaun
- Bunacurry (Bun a' Churraigh)
- Bunbeg
- Buncrana
- Bunclody
- Bundoran
- Bunmahon
- Bunnanadden
- Bunratty
- Burnfoot
- Burtonport (Ailt an Chorráin)
- Butlersbridge
- Buttevant

== C ==
- Cabinteely
- Cabra
- Cadamstown
- Caherconlish
- Caherdaniel (Cathair Dónall)
- Cahersiveen
- Cahir
- Cahiracon
- Callan
- Caltra
- Calverstown
- Camp
- Campile
- Camus
- Canningstown
- Cappagh
- Cappamore
- Cappawhite
- Caragh
- Carlingford
- Carlow
- Carnaross
- Carndonagh
- Carran
- Carraroe (an Cheathrú Rua)
- Carrick
- Carrickbeg
- Carrickmacross
- Carrickmines
- Carrick-on-Shannon
- Carrick-on-Suir
- Carrigadrohid
- Carrigaholt
- Carrigaline
- Carrigallen
- Carriganima
- Carrigans
- Carrigart (Carraig Airt)
- Carrigeen
- Carrigtwohill
- Carrowteige (Ceathrú Thaidhg)
- Cashel
- Casla
- Castlebaldwin
- Castlebar
- Castlebellingham
- Castleblakeney
- Castleblayney
- Castlebridge
- Castlecomer
- Castleconnell
- Castlecove
- Castledaly
- Castledermot
- Castlefin
- Castlegregory
- Castlehill
- Castleiney
- Castleisland
- Castlejordan
- Castleknock
- Castlelyons
- Castlemaine
- Castlemartyr
- Castleplunket
- Castlepollard
- Castlerea
- Castleshane (Monaghan)
- Castletown (Laois)
- Castletownbere
- Castletown-Geoghegan
- Castletown-Kilpatrick
- Castletown-Kinneigh
- Castletownroche
- Castletownshend
- Castletroy
- Causeway
- Cavan
- Celbridge
- Chapelizod
- Chapeltown
- Charlestown
- Charleville (Ráth Luirc)
- Cheekpoint
- Cherrywood
- Church Hill
- Churchtown (Cork)
- Churchtown (Dublin)
- Cill Ghallagáin
- Citywest
- Claddaghduff
- Clane
- Clara (Offaly)
- Clarecastle
- Clareen
- Claregalway (Baile Chláir)
- Claremorris
- Clarina
- Clashmore
- Cleariestown
- Cleggan
- Clifden
- Cliffoney
- Clogh
- Cloghan (Donegal)
- Cloghan (Offaly)
- Cloghane (an Clochán)
- Clogheen
- Clogherhead
- Cloghroe
- Clohamon
- Clonaghadoo
- Clonakilty
- Clonbur (an Fhairche)
- Clondalkin
- Clondrohid
- Clonegal
- Clones
- Clonfert
- Clonlara
- Clonliffe
- Clonmacnoise
- Clonmany
- Clonmel
- Clonmellon
- Clonmore (Carlow)
- Clonmore (Tipperary)
- Clonony
- Clonoulty
- Clonroche
- Clonsilla
- Clonskeagh
- Clontarf
- Clontibret
- Cloonacool
- Cloonbonniffe
- Cloondara
- Cloone
- Cloonfad
- Cloonfush
- Cloughduv
- Cloughjordan
- Clounanaha
- Cloyne
- Coachford
- Cobh
- Coill Dubh
- Colehill
- Collinstown
- Collon
- Collooney
- Cong
- Conna
- Convoy
- Coolafancy
- Coolaney
- Coolboy
- Coolderry
- Coolgreany
- Coolkenno
- Coolmine
- Coolock
- Coolrain
- Coonagh
- Cooraclare
- Cootehall
- Cootehill
- Corduff
- **Cork**
- Corlough
- Cornafulla
- Cornamona (Corr na Móna)
- Cornelscourt
- Corofin (Clare)
- Corofin (Galway)
- Corroy
- Courtmacsherry
- Courtown
- Craanford
- Cranford
- Cratloe
- Craughwell
- Crecora
- Cree
- Creeslough
- Cregganbaun
- Creggs
- Crettyard
- Croagh
- Croghan
- Crolly Croithlí
- Crookhaven
- Crookstown (Cork)
- Crookstown (Kildare)
- Croom
- Cross
- Crossabeg
- Crossbarry
- Crossdoney
- Crosshaven
- Crossmolina
- Crumlin
- Coolea (Cúil Aodha)
- Culdaff
- Cullen (Cork)
- Cullen (Tipperary)
- Cullenstown
- Cullohill
- Curracloe
- Curraghboy
- Currans
- Currow
- Cushina
- Cushinstown

== D ==
- Daingean
- Dalkey
- Daly's Cross
- Dartry
- Deansgrange
- Delphi
- Delvin
- Derrew
- Derrinturn
- Derrybeg (Doirí Beaga)
- Derrybrien
- Derrynane
- Dingle (Daingean Uí Chúis)
- Dolla
- Dollymount
- Dolphin's Barn
- Donabate
- Donaghmede
- Donaghmore
- Donegal
- Doneraile
- Donnybrook
- Donnycarney
- Doochary (an Dúchoraidh)
- Dooega (Dumha Éige)
- Doohoma
- Doolin
- Doon (Limerick)
- Doon (Offaly)
- Doonaha
- Doonbeg
- Dooniver (Dún Ibhir)
- Douglas
- Downings (Na Dúnaibh)
- Dowra
- Drimnagh
- Drimoleague
- Dripsey
- Drinagh
- Drogheda
- Dromahair
- Dromahane
- Dromcolliher
- Dromineer
- Dromiskin
- Dromod
- Dromore West
- Drum (Monaghan)
- Drum (Roscommon)
- Drumcliff
- Drumcondra
- Drumkeeran
- Drumlish
- Drummin
- Drumraney
- Drumshanbo
- Drumsna
- Duagh
- Dualla
- **Dublin**
- Duhallow
- Duleek
- Dunboyne
- Duncannon
- Duncormick
- Dundalk
- Dunderrow
- Dundrum (Dublin)
- Dundrum (Tipperary)
- Dunfanaghy
- Dungarvan (Waterford)
- Dungarvan (Kilkenny)
- Dungloe (an Clochán Liath)
- Dungourney
- Dunkineely
- Dún Laoghaire
- Dunlavin
- Dunleer
- Dunmanway
- Dunmore
- Dunmore East
- Dunquin (Dún Chaoin)
- Dunshaughlin
- Durrow (Laois)
- Durrow (Offaly)
- Durrus
- Dysart (Roscommon)
- Dysart (Westmeath)
- Dartry

== E ==
- Eadestown
- Easky
- East Wall
- Edenderry
- Edgeworthstown (Mostrim)
- Effin
- Elphin
- Emly
- Emo
- Emyvale
- Enfield
- Ennis
- Enniscrone
- Enniscorthy
- Enniskerry
- Ennistymon
- Errew
- Errill
- Eyeries
- Eyrecourt

== F ==
- Fahamore
- Fahan
- Falcarragh (an Fál Carrach)
- Fallmore
- Fanore
- Farranfore
- Feakle
- Fedamore
- Fenagh (Leitrim)
- Feenagh (Limerick)
- Fennagh (Carlow)
- Feohanagh (an Fheothanach)
- Ferbane
- Fenit
- Fermoy
- Ferns
- Fethard
- Fethard-on-Sea
- Fiddown
- Firies
- Finglas
- Finnea
- Fintown (Baile na Finne)
- Finuge
- Firhouse
- Flagmount
- Fossa
- Foulkesmill
- Fountainstown
- Foxford
- Foxrock
- Foynes
- Frenchpark
- Freshford
- Frosses
- Furbo

== G ==
- Galbally
- Galmoy
- **Galway**
- Garrafrauns
- Garrienderk
- Garristown
- Garryspillane
- Geesala
- Geevagh
- Glandore
- Glangevlin
- Glanmire
- Glanworth
- Glasheen
- Glaslough
- Glasnevin
- Glassan
- Glasthule
- Glen
- Glenamaddy
- Glenageary
- Glenamoy
- Glenbrook
- Glencolmcille (Gleann Cholm Cille)
- Glencullen
- Gleneely
- Glenealy
- Glenfarne
- Glengad
- Glengarriff
- Glenhest
- Glenties
- Glin
- Glinsk, County Galway
- Glinsk, County Mayo
- Glounthaune
- Gneeveguilla
- Goatstown
- Golden
- Goleen
- Goresbridge
- Gorey
- Gormanston
- Gort
- Gortahork (Gort a' Choirce)
- Gorteen
- Gortnahoe
- Gortnavern
- Gougane Barra
- Gowlan
- Gowran
- Graiguenamanagh
- Granard
- Grange (Sligo)
- Grange (Tipperary)
- Grange (Waterford)
- Grangecon
- Grangemockler
- Greenan
- Greencastle
- Greenore
- Grenagh
- Greystones
- Gurteen
- Gurranabraher
- Gweedore (Gaoth Dobhair)

== H ==
- Hacketstown
- Halfway
- Harold's Cross
- Headford
- Herbertstown
- Hollyford
- Horseleap
- Hollyfort
- Hollymount
- Hollywood
- Holycross
- Horse and Jockey
- Hospital
- Howth
- Hugginstown
- Hurlers Cross

== I ==
- Inagh
- Inch (Clare)
- Inch (Wexford)
- Inistioge
- Innishannon
- Inniskeen
- Inver (Donegal)
- Inver (Mayo)
- Inverin (Indreabhán)
- Irishtown (Dublin)
- Irishtown (Mayo)
- Islandeady
- Ivarstown
- Inchicore

== J ==
- Jamestown
- Jenkinstown (Kilkenny)
- Jenkinstown (Louth)
- Johnstown (Kildare)
- Johnstown (Kilkenny)
- Johnstown (Meath)
- Johnstown Bridge
- Julianstown

== K ==
- Kanturk
- Keadue
- Kealkill
- Keel
- Keenagh
- Kells
- Kenmare
- Kerrykeel
- Keshcarrigan
- Kilbarrack
- Kilbaha
- Kilbeggan
- Kilbeheny
- Kilberry
- Kilbricken
- Kilbrin
- Kilbrittain
- Kilcar (Cill Charthaigh)
- Kilclooney
- Kilcock
- Kilcogy
- Kilcolgan
- Kilconly
- Kilcoole
- Kilconnell
- Kilcormac
- Kilcorney
- Kilcrohane
- Kilcullane
- Kilcullen
- Kilcurl
- Kildangan
- Kildare
- Kildavin
- Kildimo
- Kildorrery
- Kildysart
- Kilfenora
- Kilfinane
- Kilflynn
- Kilgarvan
- Kilglass
- Kilkea
- Kilkee
- Kilkelly
- Kilkenny
- Kilkerrin
- Kilkieran (Cill Chiaráin)
- Kill (Kildare)
- Killadysert
- Killala
- Killaloe
- Killanne
- Killarga
- Killarney
- Killashee
- Killavullen
- Killea, County Donegal
- Killea, County Tipperary
- Killeigh
- Killenaule
- Killeshandra
- Killeshin
- Kilmainhamwood
- Killimordaly
- Killinaspick
- Killiney
- Killinierin
- Killorglin
- Kilrossanty
- Killucan
- Killurin (Offaly)
- Killurin (Wexford)
- Killybegs
- Kilmacanogue
- Kilmacduagh
- Kilmacow
- Kilmacthomas
- Kilmaine
- Kilmaley
- Kilmallock
- Kilmead
- Kilmeaden
- Kilmeage
- Kilmeedy
- Kilmeena
- Kilmessan
- Kilmichael
- Kilmihil
- Kilmore
- Kilmore Quay
- Kilmoyley
- Kilmuckridge
- Kilnaboy
- Kilnaleck
- Kilnamartyra (Cill na Martra)
- Kilpedder
- Kilquade
- Kilrane
- Kilronan (Cill Rónáin)
- Kilrush
- Kilshanchoe
- Kilshanny
- Kilskeer
- Kiltale
- Kiltartan
- Kiltealy
- Kilteel
- Kilteely
- Kiltegan
- Kilternan
- Kiltimagh
- Kiltormer
- Kiltyclogher
- Kilumney
- Kilworth
- Kincasslagh (Cionn Caslach)
- Kingscourt
- Kinlough
- Kinnegad
- Kinnitty
- Kinsale
- Kinsealy
- Kinvara
- Knightstown
- Knock (Clare)
- Knock (Mayo)
- Knockbridge
- Knockaderry
- Knocknahur
- Knockananna
- Knockanore
- Knockcroghery
- Knocklyon
- Knocknagoshel
- Knocknagree
- Knockraha
- Knocktopher

== L ==
- Labasheeda
- Lackagh
- Lacken
- Laghy
- Lahardane
- Lahinch
- Lanesborough
- Laragh (Cavan)
- Laragh (Wicklow)
- Largydonnell
- Lattin
- Lawrencetown
- Laytown
- Leabgarrow
- Leap
- Lecanvey
- Lecarrow
- Leenaun
- Leighlinbridge
- Leitrim
- Leixlip
- Lemybrien
- Letterfrack
- Letterkenny
- Lettermacaward (Leitir Mhic a' Bhaird)
- Lettermore (Leitir Móir)
- Lettermullen (Leitir Mealláin)
- Lifford
- **Limerick**
- Liscannor
- Liscarroll
- Lisdoonvarna
- Lisgoold
- Lismire
- Lismore
- Lispole (Lios Póil)
- Lisronagh
- Lisryan
- Lisselton
- Lissycasey
- Listowel
- Littleton
- Lixnaw
- Lombardstown
- Longford
- Longwood
- Lorrha
- Loughanure (Loch an Iúir)
- Loughglinn
- Loughlinstown
- Loughmore
- Loughrea
- Loughshinny
- Louisburgh
- Louth
- Lucan
- Lullymore
- Lusk
- Lyre
- Liscooley

== M ==
- Maam Cross
- Macroom
- Magheraroarty (Machaire Rabhartaigh)
- Mahon Bridge
- Mahoonagh
- Malahide
- Malin
- Mallow
- Manorhamilton
- Marlfield
- Maum
- Mayfield
- Maynooth
- Mayo
- Meelick (Clare)
- Meelick (Mayo)
- Meelin
- Meenagolan
- Menlo
- Menlough
- Merrion
- Midfield Co. Mayo
- Midleton
- Milestone
- Milford (Cork)
- Milford (Donegal)
- Millstreet
- Milltown (Dublin)
- Milltown (Galway)
- Milltown (Kerry)
- Milltown (Kildare)
- Milltownpass
- Milltown Malbay
- Minane Bridge
- Mitchelstown
- Moate
- Mohill
- Monageer
- Monaghan
- Monamolin
- Monaseed
- Monasteraden
- Monasterevin
- Moneenroe
- Moneygall
- Monkstown (Cork)
- Monkstown (Dublin)
- Montenotte
- Montpelier
- Mooncoin
- Moone
- Mothel
- Mountbellew
- Mountcharles
- Mountcollins
- Mountmellick
- Mountnugent
- Mountrath
- Mountshannon
- Mount Merrion
- Mount Temple
- Moville
- Moycarkey
- Moycullen (Maigh Cuilinn)
- Moydow
- Moygownagh
- Moylough
- Moynalty
- Moyvane
- Moyvoughly
- Muff
- Mulhuddart
- Mulhussey
- Mullagh (Cavan)
- Mullagh (Clare)
- Mullaghmore
- Mullinahone
- Mullinavat
- Mullingar
- Mulranny
- Multyfarnham
- Murroe
- Murrooghtoohy
- Murrintown
- Murrisk
- Myrtleville
- Myshall

== N ==
- Naas
- Nad
- Narin
- Narraghmore
- Naul
- Navan
- Neale
- Nenagh
- Newbawn
- New Birmingham
- Newbliss
- Newbridge (Galway)
- Newbridge (Kildare)
- Newcastle (Dublin)
- Newcastle (Wicklow)
- Newcastle West
- Newcestown
- New Inn (Galway)
- New Inn (Laois)
- New Inn (Tipperary)
- Newmarket
- Newmarket-on-Fergus
- Newport (Mayo)
- Newport (Tipperary)
- New Ross
- Newtown (Laois)
- Newtown (Tipperary)
- Newtowncashel
- Newtowncunningham
- Newtownforbes
- Newtowngore
- Newtownmountkennedy
- Ninemilehouse
- Nobber
- Nohoval
- North Wall
- Nurney (Carlow)
- Nurney (Kildare)

== O ==
- O'Briensbridge
- O'Callaghans Mills
- Ogonnelloe
- Oilgate
- Old Leighlin
- Oldcastle
- Oldtown (Dublin)
- Old Town (Roscommon)
- Omeath
- Ongar
- Oola
- Oranmore
- Oughterard
- Oulart
- Ovens
- Owenbeg
- Oxmantown
- Oysterhaven

== P ==
- Palatine
- Pallasgreen
- Pallaskenry
- Palmerstown
- Parteen
- Partry
- Passage East
- Passage West
- Patrickswell
- Paulstown
- Perrystown
- Pettigo
- Piltown
- Pollagh
- Pontoon
- Portacloy
- Portarlington
- Portlaoise
- Portlaw
- Portmagee
- Portmarnock
- Portnablagh
- Portrane
- Portroe
- Portumna
- Poulaphouca
- Poulpeasty
- Prosperous
- Puckane
- Pullathomas

== Q ==
- Quigley's Point
- Quilty
- Quin

== R ==
- Rahara
- Raharney
- Raheen (Laois)
- Raheen (Limerick)
- Raheen (Wexford)
- Raheny
- Ramelton
- Ranelagh
- Rannafast (Rann na Feirste)
- Raphoe
- Rathangan (Kildare)
- Rathangan (Wexford)
- Rathcabbin
- Ráth Chairn
- Rathcoffey
- Rathconrath
- Rathcoole
- Rathcormac
- Rathdowney
- Rathdrum
- Rathfarnham
- Rathgar
- Rathgormack
- Rathkeale
- Rathmines
- Rathmolyon
- Rathmore
- Rathmullan
- Rathnaconeen
- Rathnew
- Rathnure
- Rathowen
- Rathvilly
- Ratoath
- Rearcross
- Recess
- Redcastle
- Redcross
- Redhouse
- Redhills (Cavan)
- Rerrin
- Renmore
- Ring (An Rinn)
- Ringaskiddy
- Ringsend
- Riverchapel
- Riverquarter
- Riverstick
- Riverstown (Sligo)
- Riverstown (Tipperary/Offaly)
- Robertstown
- Rochfortbridge
- Rochestown
- Rockchapel
- Rockbrook
- Rockcorry
- Rockmills
- Rolestown
- Roosky
- Rosbercon
- Roscommon
- Roscrea
- Rosegreen
- Rosemount
- Rosenallis
- Roslevan
- Rosmuc
- Rossaveel (Ros a' Mhíl)
- Rosscarbery
- Rosses Point
- Rossinver
- Rosslare Harbour
- Rosslare Strand
- Rossnowlagh
- Rossport (Ros Dumhach)
- Roundstone
- Roundwood
- Royal Oak
- Ruan
- Rush
- Rushbrooke
- Rylane
- Rialto

== S ==
- Saggart
- Salia (Sáile)
- Sallins
- Sallybrook
- Sallynoggin
- Salthill
- Saltmills
- Sandpit
- Sandycove
- Sandyford
- Sandymount
- Santry
- Scarnagh
- Scariff
- Scartaglen
- Scraggane
- Schull
- Scotshouse
- Scotstown
- Screeb
- Shammer
- Shanagarry
- Shanahoe
- Shanagolden
- Shandonagh
- Shanbally
- Shanballymore
- Shankill
- Shannonbridge
- Shannon Harbour
- Shannon
- Sheean
- Shercock
- Sheriff Street
- Shinrone
- Shrove
- Shrule
- Silvermines
- Sixmilebridge
- Skehana
- Skerries
- Skibbereen
- Skreen
- Skryne
- Slane
- Sligo
- Smithborough
- Sneem
- Sooey
- Spanish Point
- Spiddal (an Spidéal)
- Spink
- St Johnston
- St Mullin's
- Stamullen
- Staplestown
- Stepaside
- Stillorgan
- Stonetown
- Stoneybatter
- Stradbally (Laois)
- Strade
- Stradone
- Straffan
- Stranorlar
- Stratford-on-Slaney
- Streamstown
- Strokestown
- Summerhill
- Suncroft
- Sutton
- Swanlinbar
- Swinford
- Swords

== T ==
- Tacumshane
- Taghmaconnell
- Taghmon
- Taghshinny
- Tallaght
- Tallow
- Tang
- Tarbert
- Tarmonbarry
- Tassan
- Teelin (Teileann)
- Templeglantine
- Templemore
- Templeogue
- Templenoe
- Terenure
- Termon
- Termonfeckin
- Terryglass
- The Glen
- The Harrow
- The Rower
- The Swan
- Thomastown
- Thurles
- Ticknock
- Timahoe
- Timoleague
- Timolin
- Tinahely
- Tinryland
- Tinure
- Tipperary
- Tivoli
- Togher, Cork
- Toomevara
- Touraneena
- Toorlestraun
- Toormakeady (Tuar Mhic Éadaigh)
- Tower
- Tragumna
- Tralee
- Tramore
- Trim
- Tuam
- Tuamgraney
- Tournafulla
- Tubber (Clare)
- Tubber (Galway)
- Tubber (Offaly)
- Tubberclare
- Tubbercurry
- Tulla
- Tullaghan
- Tullahought
- Tullamore
- Tullow
- Tullyallen
- Tulrahan
- Tulsk
- Turloughmore
- Two-Mile Borris
- Tydavnet
- Tynagh
- Tyrrellspass

== U ==
- Union Hall
- Upperchurch
- Upton
- Urlingford
- Urris

== V ==
- Valleymount
- Ventry (Ceann Trá)
- Vicarstown
- Villierstown
- Virginia

== W ==
- Walkinstown
- Walsh Island
- Watch House Village
- Waterfall
- **Waterford**
- Watergrasshill
- Waterville
- Wellingtonbridge
- Wellpark
- Westport
- Wexford
- Whitechurch
- Whitegate (Clare)
- Whitegate (Cork)
- Wicklow
- Wilkinstown
- Williamstown
- Wilton
- Windgap
- Windy Arbour
- Woodenbridge
- Woodford
- Woodlawn
- Whitehall

== Y ==
- Yellow Furze
- Youghal

== See also ==
- List of places in Ireland
  - List of places in the Republic of Ireland
  - List of urban areas in the Republic of Ireland as defined by the Central Statistics Office. Includes non-municipal towns and suburbs outside municipal boundaries
    - List of urban areas in the Republic of Ireland/2011 census
    - List of urban areas in the Republic of Ireland/2006 census
    - List of urban areas in the Republic of Ireland/2002 census
  - List of cities, boroughs and towns in the Republic of Ireland, with municipal councils and legally defined boundaries up to 2014
- List of towns and villages in Northern Ireland
- List of settlements on the island of Ireland by population
