= Cillín =

Unconsecrated burial place for unbaptised children

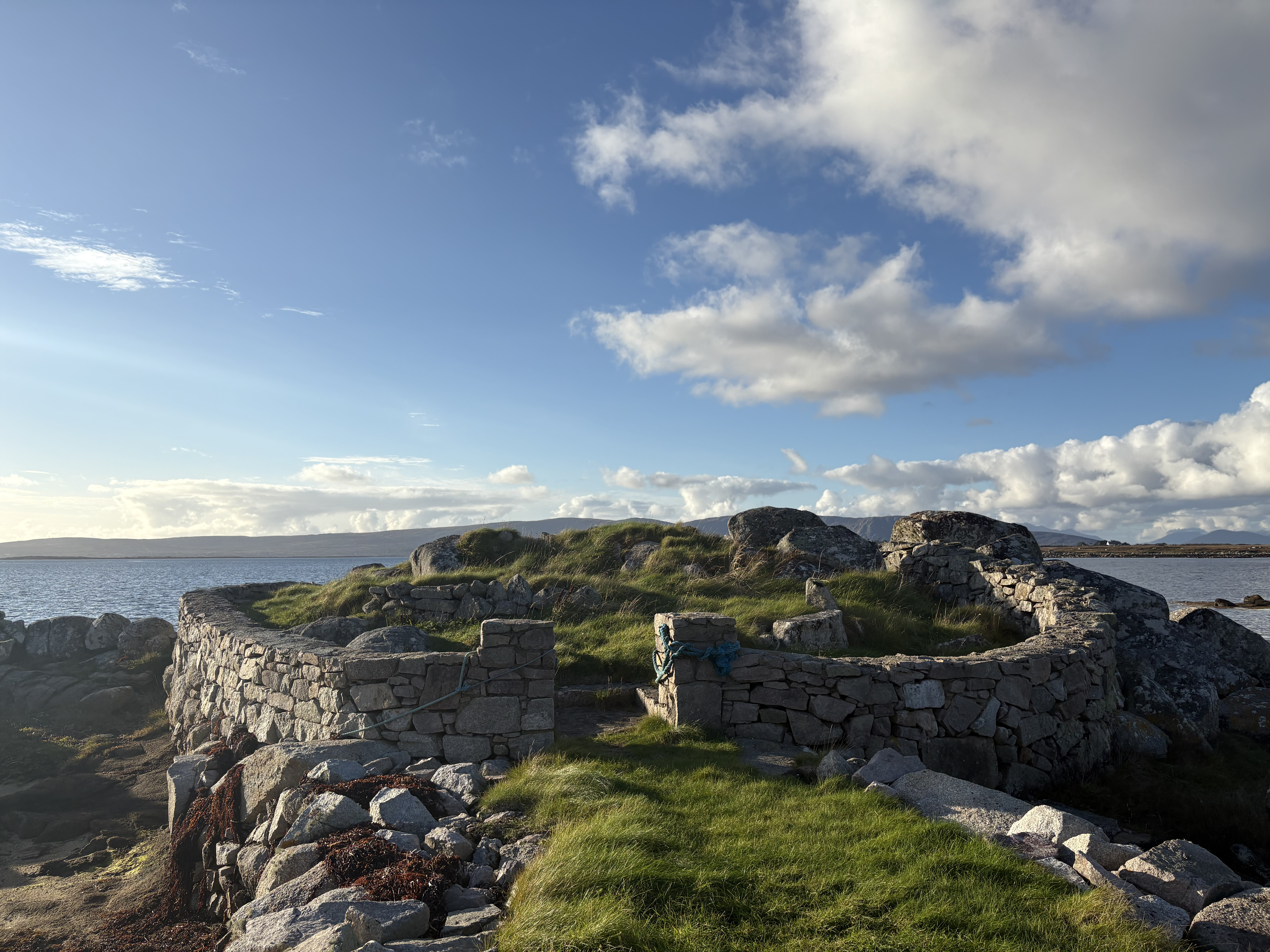
Cillín on the seashore of Bealadangan, County Galway

A cillín (Note: Cilliní are known by a variety of terms, including caldragh, calluragh, cealltrach, ceallúnach, ceallúrach, lisín, children's burial ground, cill burial ground, killeen, and kyle burial ground.) (plural cillíní or cillíns) is a type of historic burial ground in Ireland, used primarily for the burial of unbaptised and stillborn children. They were also used to inter other people who could not be buried in consecrated Catholic cemeteries, including suicides, the mentally ill and disabled, shipwrecked dead, criminals, famine victims, and foreigners.

== Description ==
Cillín burials are often marked with small stones outlining the shape of the burial, and may contain a cist-like structure or wooden coffin holding the remains. Many were buried in shrouds held together with pins. These burial practices are very similar to those of contemporaneous consecrated cemeteries.

Some folkloric accounts suggest that burial would take place during the daytime, while others state that burial typically took place at night due to the shame associated with stillbirth.

== Distribution ==
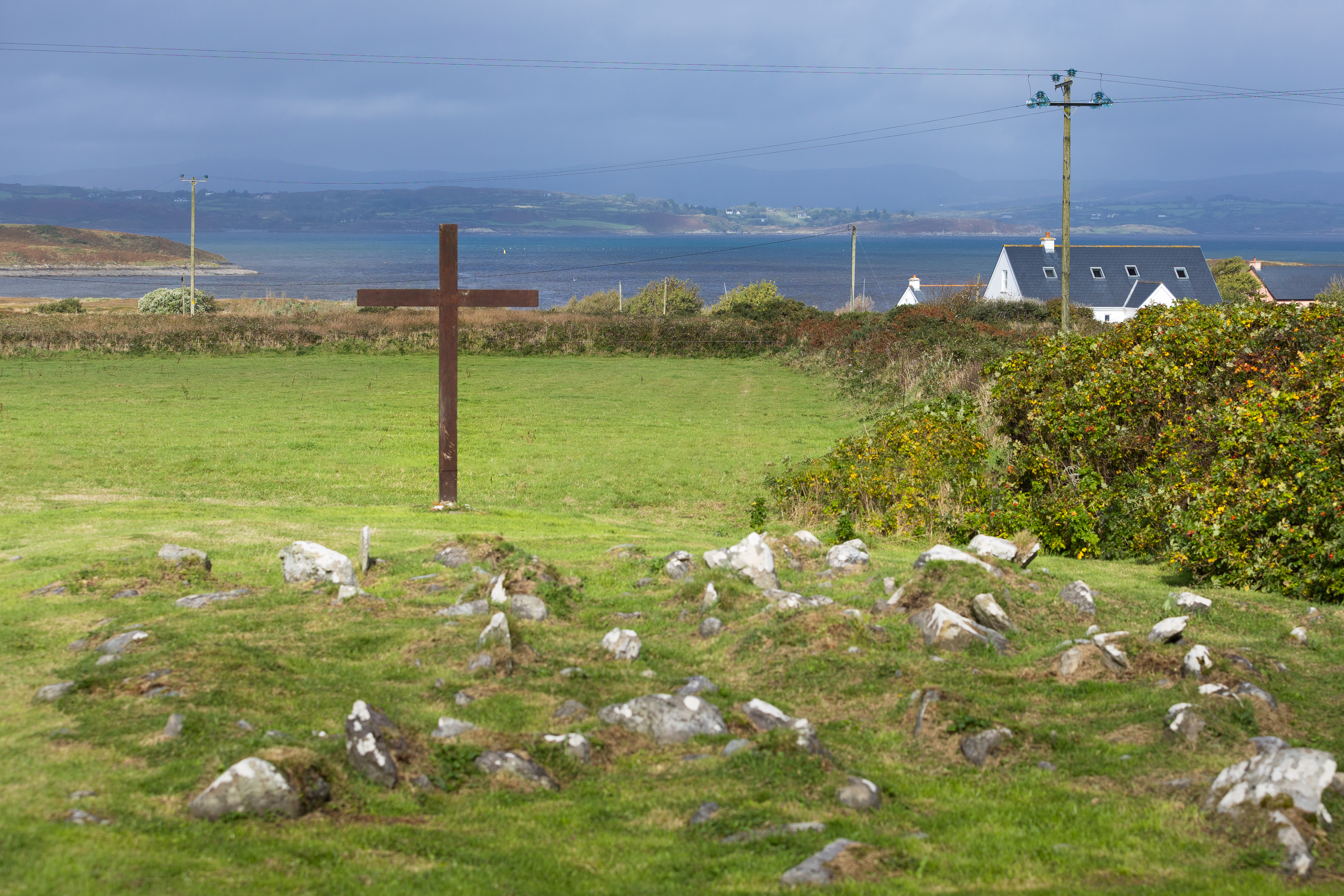
Cillín on Heir Island, County Cork

As of 2021, there were 1,693 recorded cillíní on the island of Ireland. County Galway has the most recorded cillíní, with 480 in 2021; Kerry has 260, Mayo has 224, Cork has 198, and Clare has 150.

Cilliní can be located in a number of different environments, but are typically in prominent places in the landscape. They are frequently found in repurposed ecclesiastical sites, abandoned graveyards, or other archaeological monuments. Other common sites are natural landmarks, crossroads, and boundaries, as well as lakeshores and seashores. Deirdre Crombie found that 65% of the 34 cillíní in the barony of Dunmore, County Galway, were in the vicinity of townland boundaries. The majority (56%) of them were located within ringforts, and a further seven were at church sites.

== History ==
In the early Christian Church, the baptism of a newborn baby was of primary importance. In some regions, but not all regions, the Catholic Church prohibited the burial of unbaptized babies in consecrated graveyards. It is not known when people began to use separate burial grounds in Ireland. There is no historical evidence that supports the use of alternative burial grounds during the early medieval period. The earliest historical reference to the use of cillíní in Ireland was in 1619. It has been theorized that cillíní were established during this time period as a result of strict reforms implemented by the Catholic Church during the Counter-Reformation regarding unbaptized infants, and continued to be used until the Second Vatican Council in the 1960s.

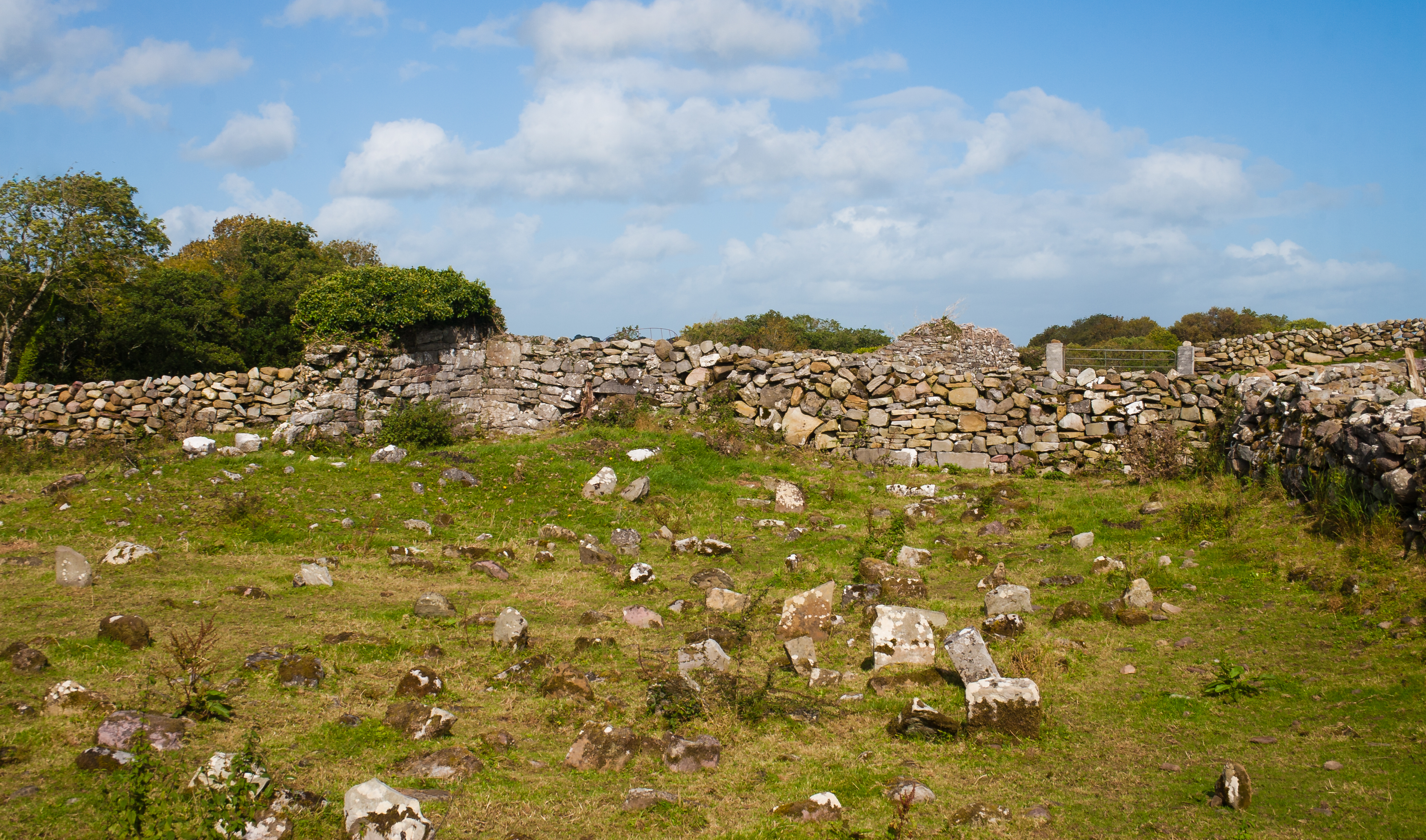
Cillín on Inishmicatreer in Lough Corrib

Sixteen cillíní were excavated in Ireland from 1966 to 2004. The findings from the excavations revealed that these sites dated from the mid-1500s to mid 1800s. Historical evidence has shown that cillíní were carefully selected. Areas with a previous religious function were often used because of the idea of the sacred nature of the site. A characteristic of many cillíní burials were the placement of white quartz pebbles along with other stone pebbles on the child's grave. Quartz had been used in monastic burials in Great Britain, and may have held a special significance for honoring or cherishing the dead. There is historical evidence that cillíní burials were a respectful process. Graves were often surrounded by stones to mark their outline. Some children were carefully placed during burial, either lying on their back or their sides. In some locations, there were coffin burials or graves lined with stones.

The study of 19th century maps, local histories, and interviews with community elders have helped preserve the location of many cillíní, but as people moved away from small towns, many of these sites were lost. In the 19th century, many of the burial sites were destroyed and converted to farmland. Legislation enacted in Ireland in the mid-1800s's had a profound impact on cillíní burials. The 1863 Act for the Registration of Births and Deaths in Ireland, obligated parents to register the birth and death of their children. There would be no more hidden burials without the penalty of a fine. Priests were also undergoing change by the late 1800s. There are examples of new arrangements being made at the end of cemeteries to accommodate the burial of unbaptized children.

Cillíní are now recognized as a class of archaeological monument. They have attracted the attention of archaeologists and historians, and have been the subject of study and archaeological excavations throughout Ireland. Today, many towns and villages in Ireland are recovering human remains from cillíní and moving these once excluded individuals to consecrated churchyards. Other sites remain intact, and have been consecrated by special religious ceremonies. In August 2014, at St. Patrick's Church in Cushendun, a religious ceremony led by the parish priest and attended by many in the community, celebrated the reburial of 19 children's skeletons. The children's remains were discovered during an archeological excavation at Castle Carra, near Cushendun.

== Cultural significance and perception ==
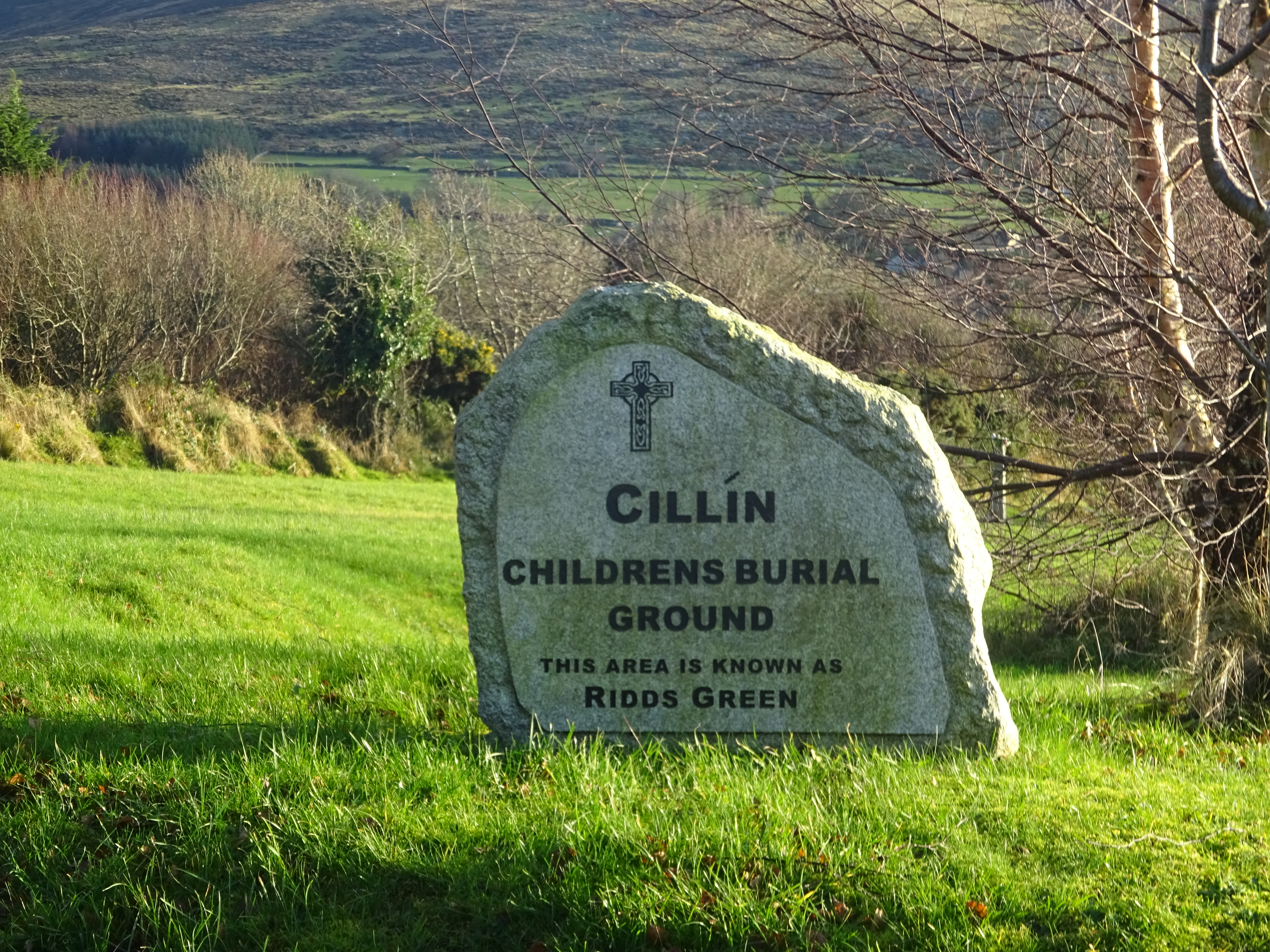
Plaque at Ridds Green, near Lacken, County Wicklow

Cilliní have been compared to the mass graves found at Mother and Baby Homes, Magdalene laundries, and the Kerry babies case.

=== Folklore ===
Seán Ó Súilleabháin produced the first study of the folklore around cillíní in 1939. Archaeologist Marion Dowd surveyed the National Folklore Collection and the Record of Monuments and Places to correlate folklore with known cillíní. One of the most common ideas in cillín folklore is the "stray sod": if a person were to walk over the grave of an unbaptized person, they would lose their sense of direction and be unable to find their way home. A similar concept is the "hungry sod" (or "famine sod") which causes the person walking over it to have intense pangs of hunger. Another common theme relates to the spirits of the unbaptized children buried in cillíní. Belief that the deceased were not at peace was common, and there are numerous stories about the spirits of infants appearing as lights and disembodied voices.

=== In media ===
Cilliní are rarely discussed in English-language Irish literature, although they feature in Tom Murphy's play Bailegangaire and are central to Mary Burke's 1985 novel The Killeen, in which the cillín is portrayed as "a conduit for unsanctioned ritual and unacknowledged suffering."

== See also ==
- Eaves-drip burial
