= Scarnagh =

Coordinates: 52°45′20″N 6°12′37″W

Scarnagh Cross or Scarnagh (Irish: Scearnach) is a small hamlet in north County Wexford in Ireland. It is located four miles from the sea, on the R772 regional road between Gorey and Arklow. The village of Coolgreany is nearby. The townlands of Scarnagh Lower (Irish: Scearnach Íochtarach) and Scarnagh Upper (Scearnach Uachtarach) lie in the historic barony of Gorey.

== See also ==
- List of towns and villages in Ireland
