= George Harrison (Irish republican) =

Irish-American gun runner (1915–2004)

- Born: 2 May 1915; Shammer, Kilkelly, County Mayo, Ireland
- Died: 6 October 2004 (aged 89); Brooklyn, New York City, U.S.
- Occupation: Gun runner
- Organization(s): Provisional IRA; Continuity IRA
- Political party: Sinn Féin (until 1986); Republican Sinn Féin
- Military Service
- Allegiance: United States
- Branch: US Army
- Service years: April 1944 to February 1946
- Rank: Corporal
- Conflicts: World War II: Pacific Theatre

George Harrison (2 May 1915 – 6 October 2004) was a primary gun runner for the Irish Republican Army and Provisional Irish Republican Army from the 1950s until 1981.

== Background ==
Harrison was born in May 1915 in Shammer, Kilkelly, County Mayo, Ireland to parents Tom ‘Yank’ Harrison and Winnie McDermott. The area Harrison grew up in has been described as fiercely Irish Republican, and it was there that he experienced the chaotic years of both the Irish War of Independence and the Irish Civil War. In one incident that stayed with him for the rest of his life, he remembered a visit by the Black and Tans to his mother's shop that ended with them assaulting him. During the Civil War a cousin of Harrison, Michael Duffy, was shot while fighting as a part of the Anti-Treaty IRA. Both these incidents contributed to his growing belief in Irish Republicanism.

At age 16 in 1931, Harrison joined what remnants remained of the Irish Republican Army. However, by this point, the IRA was at a low ebb and his unit never saw any actual fighting. By the mid-1930s, he had emigrated to England where he worked as a farm labourer. He briefly returned to Ireland in 1938 before emigrating again, this time to the United States, settling in New York City. Between April 1944 and February 1946, he served with the US Army in World War II in the Pacific Theatre. Following the war, he became active in Irish-American political organisations such as Clan na Gael and the James Connolly Club. It was during this time Harrison became affiliated with Liam Cotter, a fellow Irish immigrant from County Kerry who had also spent time in the IRA.

At some point in the mid-1950s, the IRA approached Cotter and Harrison about supplying them arms for their Border Campaign, a request which the pair accepted, beginning a gun running career which would last for several decades. Harrison was able to source arms for the IRA through George de Meo, an Italian-American neighbour of his who had connections to the Mafia as well as gun runners who were supplying rebels in Cuba.

In 1962, Cotter and Harrison cut their ties with the IRA as it became apparent the Border campaign was a failure. However, after the start of the Troubles, Dáithí Ó Conaill was able to convince them to support the Provisional IRA in 1970; once again, they began supplying arms to the IRA. Almost all smuggled guns went through the network run by Harrison. In 1975, Harrison appeared before a grand jury investigating arms trafficking; however, he was released without charge.

By 1975, the United States Department of Justice started to significantly weaken the Harrison network by prosecuting dozens of IRA arms trafficking cases since the start of the Troubles in 1969, and as early as 1973, the IRA already found more lucrative sources of funding and weapons from foreign states, including Libyan dictator Muammar Gaddafi. The prosecutions of IRA gunrunners in America were so great that according to Belfast author Jack Holland, "Harrison was not aware of any major shipments of arms that had successfully reached the IRA from the U.S. since the late 1970s; that is, before his network's destruction [in 1981]." U.S. House Speaker Tip O'Neill told Northern Ireland Secretary of State Roy Mason in mid-October 1977 that "[t]he flow of guns and money had been greatly reduced."

== 1981 arrest and trial in the US ==
In 1981, Harrison was arrested by the FBI Joint Terrorism Task Force during a sting operation called "Operation Bushmill". Harrison, Tom Falvey, Michael Flannery, Pat Mullin, and Danny Gormley, all Irish immigrants, were acquitted in a criminal trial held in New York City, which lasted from December 1980 to June 1981. Their acquittal was widely attributed to the unconventional efforts of Harrison's personal attorney, Frank Durkan; the men admitted to their activities but claimed that they believed the operation had Central Intelligence Agency sanction. During the trial, a number of people spoke on the defendants' behalf, including Bernadette Devlin.

== Post-acquittal ==
Although he had spent much of the previous decade involved in this operation, his acquittal marked the end of his active career as an IRA gun-runner as well as the IRA's considerable source of American arms supply (by 1980, the IRA was already importing a large number of weapons from mainland Europe and the Middle East). Throughout his life he would devote his time to other various left-wing causes, including support for the African National Congress, the Sandinista movement, the Cuban Revolution, the Second Spanish Republic and the independence movement in Puerto Rico.

Harrison broke with the Provisional Republican Movement in 1986 when Provisional Sinn Féin dropped the traditional Republican stance of not taking their seats in Dáil Éireann. He joined Republican Sinn Féin and was a founder and activist of the Republican support group Cumann na Saoirse/Irish Freedom Committee in the US. He was a patron of Republican Sinn Féin until he died.

He also took a number of controversial stances within the broader Irish-American community in New York City, including outspoken support for former Mayor David Dinkins, support for the inclusion of LGBT marchers in the New York Saint Patrick's Day Parade and his open defiance of the Ancient Order of Hibernians.

He died at the age of 89 in October 2004 from natural causes at his home in Brooklyn, New York City.
