= Goulane =

Goulane or Gowlane is an anglicisation of the Irish language term, An Gabhlán, which means "little fork". Gowlane is the name of a number of townlands in Ireland, including:

- Goulane (or Gowlane), a townland in the civil parish of Stradbally, County Kerry
- Goulaun, a townland in the civil parish of Crossmolina, County Mayo
- Gowlan, a townland in the civil parish of Tomregan, County Cavan
- Gowlan West (or Gowlan), a townland in the civil parish of Moyrus, County Galway
