= Insh (disambiguation) =

Insh is an alternative spelling of the Scots word "inch", itself derived from the Gaelic innis, meaning "island" or "meadow". Insh may refer to:

- Insh, a village in Speyside
- Insh Island, one of the Slate Islands off the west coast of Argyll
- Loch Insh in Speyside
- Insh Marshes an RSPB wildlife reserve, in Speyside

== See also ==
- Insch, a village in the Garioch, Aberdeenshire
- Inshes, a district of Inverness
- Scottish inch, a unit of measurement
- , including islands named "Inch ..."
