= Ballinagar =

Village in County Offaly, Ireland

Ballinagar Béal Átha na gCarr
- Village
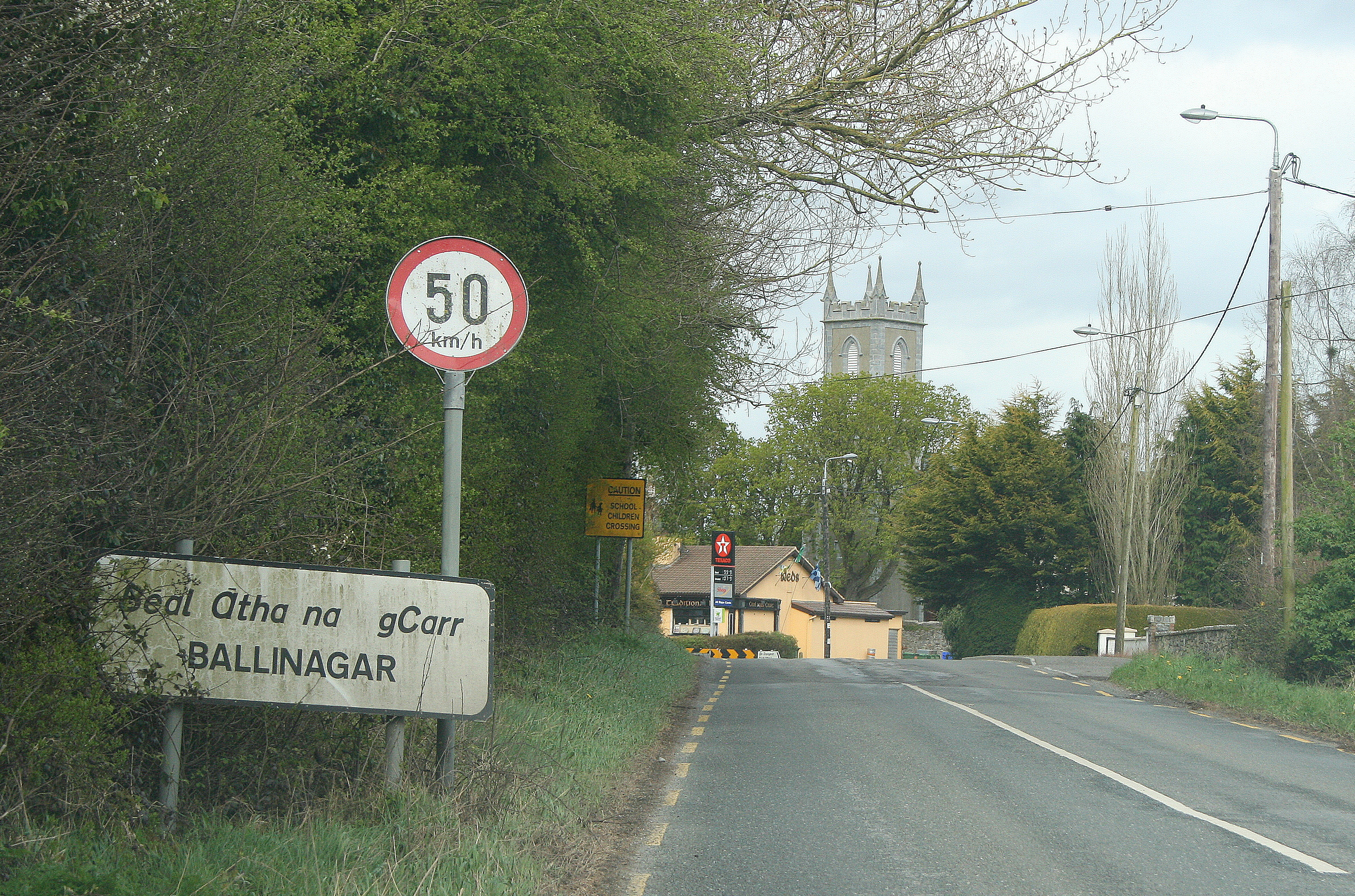

- Location in Ireland
- Coordinates: 53°16′00″N 7°20′17″W
- Country: Ireland
- Province: Leinster
- County: Offaly
- Elevation: 82 m (269 ft)

Population (2016)
  - Total: 453
- Time zone: UTC+0 (WET)
  - Summer (DST): UTC-1 (IST (WEST))
- Irish Grid Reference: N441242

Ballinagar (historically Bellanagar, from Irish: Béal Átha na gCarr) is a village in County Offaly, Ireland. It lies on the R402 regional road, roughly midway between Daingean and Tullamore.

The Church of St. Joseph, built in 1837, serves as the Roman Catholic parish church in the village. The local national school, also named St. Joseph's, originally opened in 1949 but moved to a new building in 2011/2012.

== Sport ==
Ballinagar GAA is a Gaelic Athletic Association Gaelic Football club in the village of Ballinagar in County Offaly, Ireland.

== See also ==
- List of towns and villages in the Republic of Ireland
