= Redhouse, County Kilkenny =

Redhouse An Tigh Rua
- Townland
- Location in Ireland
- Coordinates: 52°35′08″N 7°25′30″W
- Country: Ireland
- Province: Leinster
- County: County Kilkenny
- Time zone: UTC+0 (WET)
  - Summer (DST): UTC-1 (IST (WEST))
- Website: www.kilkennycoco.ie/eng/

Redhouse (Irish: An Tigh Rua) is a townland in County Kilkenny, Ireland located midway between the towns of Callan and Kilmanagh.

Redhouse is noted in historical records as having a well which was used by thousands during the Great Irish Famine as many other wells in the area had gone dry. This is attributed to a higher-than-average survival rate in the area during the famine.

== See also ==
- List of towns and villages in Ireland
