= Daingean =

Town in County Offaly, Ireland

Daingean An Daingean
- Town
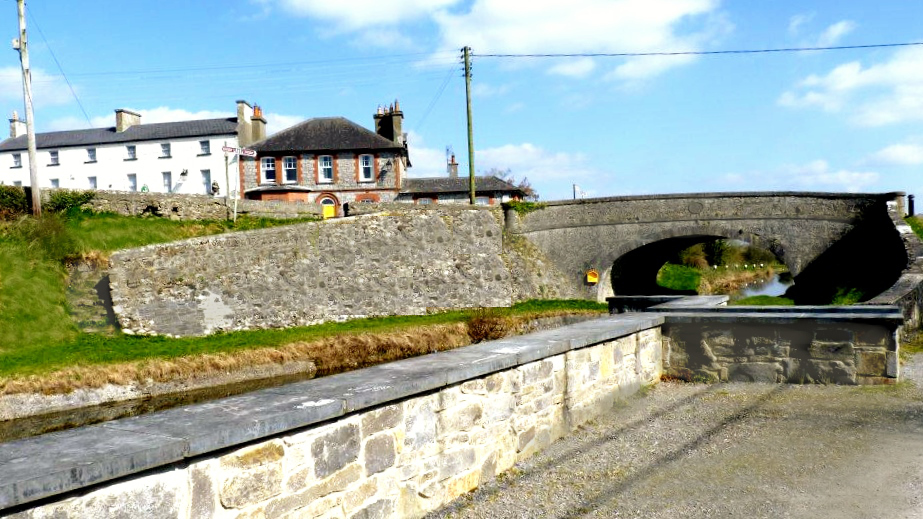
- Molesworth Bridge, Daingean as seen from the Harbour

- Location in Ireland
- Coordinates: 53°17′42″N 7°17′31″W
- Country: Ireland
- Province: Leinster
- County: Offaly

Government
  - Dáil constituency: Laois–Offaly
- Elevation: 78 m (256 ft)

Population (2022)
  - Total: 1,223
- Time zone: UTC+0 (WET)
  - Summer (DST): UTC-1 (IST (WEST))
- Area code: 057
- Irish Grid Reference: N474275

Historical population
Year	Pop.	±%
1821	1,619	—
1831	1,454	−10.2%
1841	1,189	−18.2%
1851	748	−37.1%
1861	1,074	+43.6%
1871	820	−23.6%
1881	829	+1.1%
1891	836	+0.8%
1901	778	−6.9%
1911	659	−15.3%
1926	460	−30.2%
1936	518	+12.6%
1946	663	+28.0%
1951	660	−0.5%
1956	648	−1.8%
1961	679	+4.8%
1966	605	−10.9%
1971	492	−18.7%
1981	551	+12.0%
1986	659	+19.6%
1991	641	−2.7%
1996	679	+5.9%
2002	777	+14.4%
2006	1,056	+35.9%
2011	1,037	−1.8%
2016	1,077	+3.9%
2022	1,223	+13.6%

Daingean (/ˈdæŋɡən/; Irish: An Daingean, meaning 'the fort' or Daingean Ua bhFáilghe), formerly Philipstown, named after King Philip II of Spain (then King of Ireland by jure uxoris), is a small town in east County Offaly, Ireland. It is situated midway between the towns of Tullamore and Edenderry on the R402 regional road. The town of Daingean had a population, as of the 2022 census, of 1,223. It is the principal town of the Daingean Catholic Parish. The other main poles of this parish are Ballycommon, Kilclonfert, and Cappincur.

== History ==
Daingean was originally named Philipstown in 1556 when it was established as the county town of the newly shired King's County that was planted by Mary I. The town and the county were so named after her husband and co-monarch Philip who was the titular King of Ireland. From his wife's death in 1558 he no longer held royal status in England or Ireland, and was soon afterwards crowned as Philip II of Spain. The Philipstown parliamentary borough sent two MPs to the Irish House of Commons until its abolition in 1801.

The town was once the seat of the O'Connor clan, who were chieftains of the surrounding area of Offaly. Its current name of Daingean, from Daingean Ua bhFáilghe, means fortress of the Uí Fáilghe clan, a name that it derived from the medieval island fortress of O'Connor Faly. In 1883, Tullamore replaced Daingean as the focal point of the county, being on a railway line. As a result, Philipstown was demoted from county town to village and as a result lost most of its political status. With the foundation of the Irish Free State in 1922, the village was renamed Daingean, at the same time as County Offaly replaced the old style of King's County.

In the 1850s, Philipstown Gaol was used to detain people who were convicted and sentenced to transportation to Australia while they waited for a ship to transport them. Many of them died in the jail after spending several years waiting to be transported.

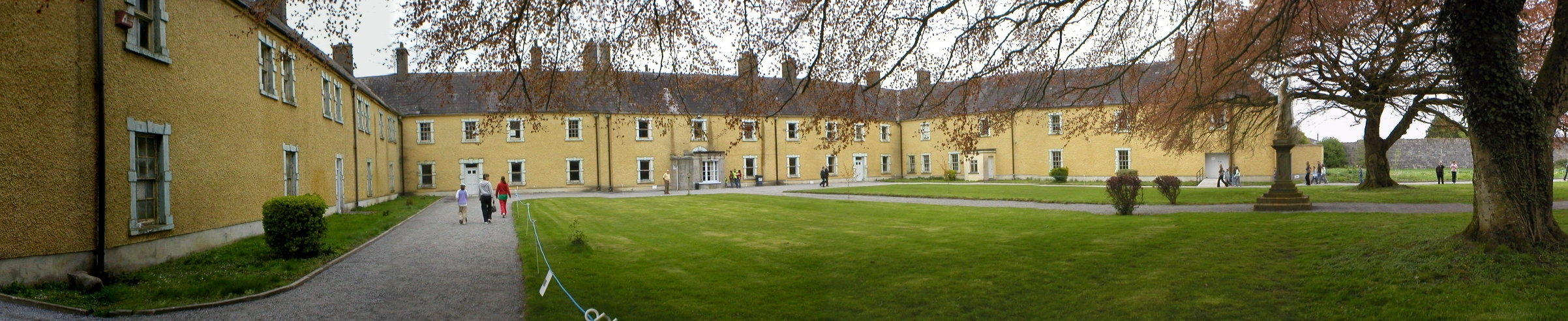
The Daingean Reformatory

Public buildings in Daingean include the courthouse, whose design is locally attributed to James Gandon, and a children's reformatory, known as St Conleth's Reformatory. The remnants of a military barracks (known as the footbarrack) gives its name to the bridge leading out of the town towards Tullamore - the footbarrack bridge. There are the remnants of a Church of Ireland (Anglican) church and a functioning Roman Catholic church. A number of these buildings are no longer used for their original function. The courthouse, for example, has functioned as a town hall, dance hall and bingo hall, having been renovated in the 1980s.

A bog body, given the name Old Croghan Man, was found near Daingean in 2004 and featured on the BBC Two Timewatch programme in January 2006.

A book called From the Quiet Annals of Daingean was written and published by John Kearney of Daingean in December 2006.

While there is a local farming economy, many of the people from Daingean work in Tullamore or commute further afield. Daingean is surrounded by the Bog of Allen and Bord Na Mona (BnM) remains a local employer, however the number employed is much reduced from the heyday when local people made a living working at the briquette factory and on the bog. The ESB power station at nearby Rhode was also a significant employer before its closure. Even in the period of high unemployment in the 1980s, the ESB and BnM trained local men in their apprenticeship programmes.

Publican Matt Farrell was murdered in the town on 1 April 2009. A €10,000 reward was offered for information when the crime had not been solved several months later.

== Tourism ==
The Grand Canal, which links Dublin and the River Shannon, passes through the village. The village has an 18-hole golf course, Castle Barna Golf Club. Daingean is also home to Grand Canal Adventures who provide kayaking, water zorbing, bicycle hire and other water sports and leisure activities on the canal.

== Cultural events ==
The Daingean Homecoming Festival is a week-long event hosted at the beginning of each August. The festival includes a raft race on the Grand Canal, a parade, traditional threshing, a karaoke competition and a children's day. During the Daingean Homecoming Festival, a "festival queen" is selected by a panel of judges. On the Friday night of the festival, the Tullamore Harriers Athletic Club organise a 5 km road race which makes four loops of the town. The race has previously seen over 100 runners taking part.

== Transport ==
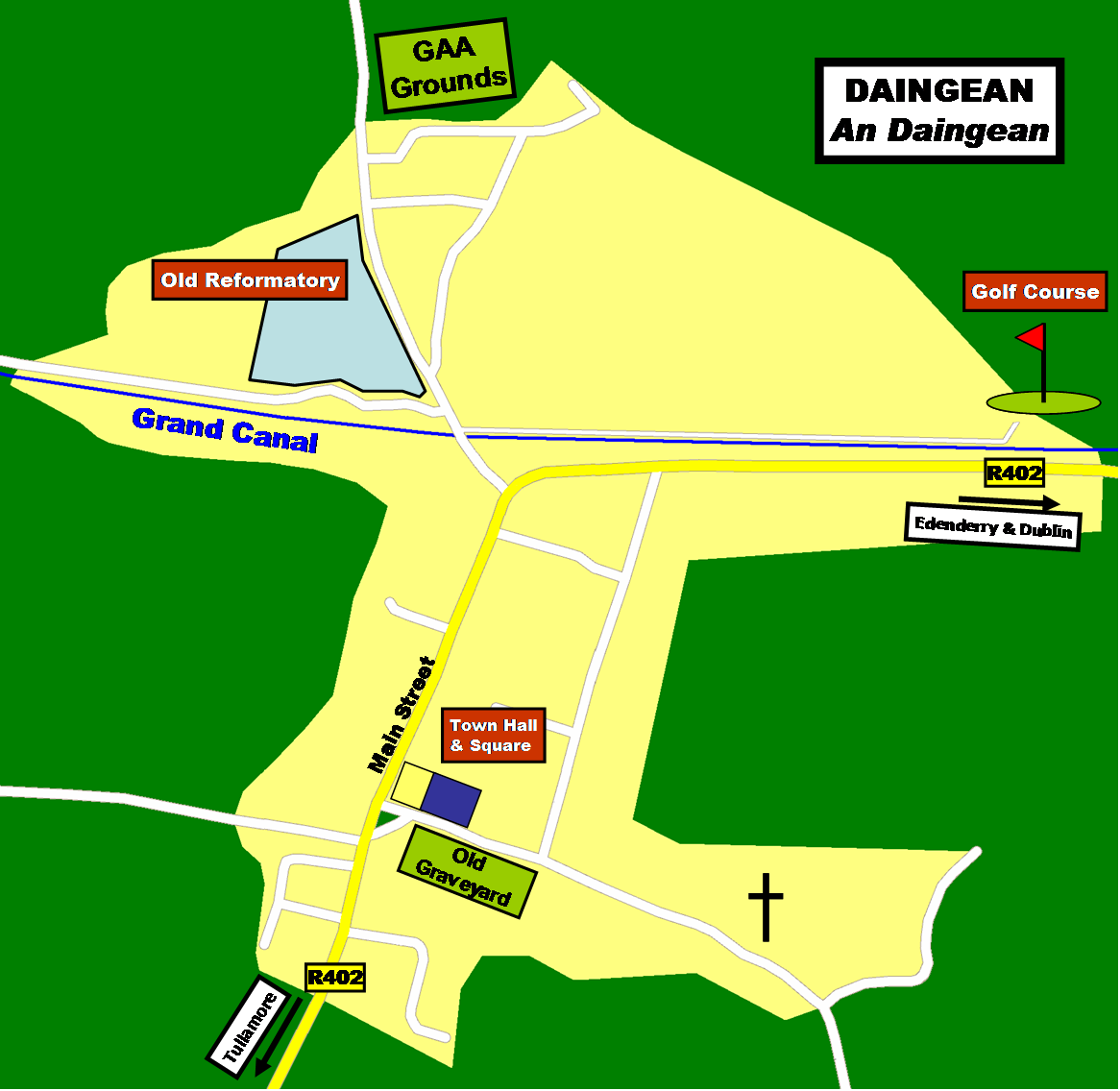
Map of Daingean

The regional R402 road forms the principal street of Daingean known as Main Street. This road links Enfield, Edenderry, Daingean, Ballinagar and (through the R420) Tullamore.

Daingean is served by a Bus Éireann commuter bus service through route 120.

The nearest railway station is Tullamore railway station, approximately 17.5 km (10.9 mi) or 15 to 20 minutes away.

== People ==
- Mrs. Eckleston of Philipstown was stated to be 143 when she died (1548–1691).
- Patrick Dunne (1818–1900), a Roman Catholic priest who ministered in Australia, was born in Philipstown.
- Lord Charles Beresford (1846–1919), British admiral and politician; born in Philipstown.
- Joe Connor (1877–1934), an Irish international footballer who played for West Bromwich Albion, Arsenal and Fulham among others, was born in Philipstown.
- Kevin Kilmurray, former Offaly footballer and manager
- Geraldine O'Neill is an author, originally from Scotland, living in Daingean since 1991. Her mother was originally from Daingean. O'Neill primarily writes historical fiction novels, many of which are set in County Offaly.

== See also ==
- List of towns and villages in Ireland
