= R402 road (Ireland) =

Regional road in Ireland

R402 road
- Bóthar R402
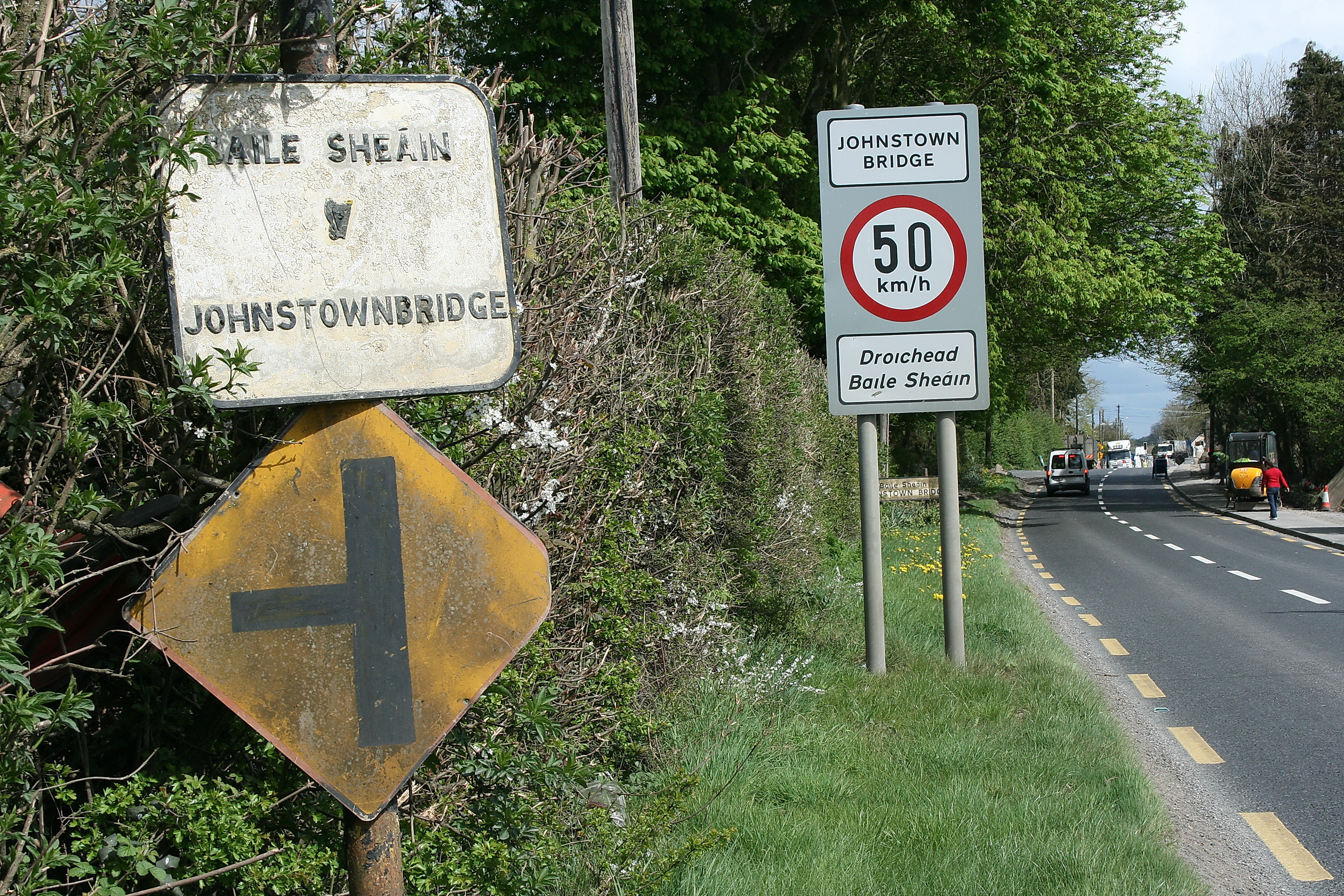
- Approaching Johnstown Bridge from the west

Route information
- Length: 45 km (28 mi)

Location
- Country: Ireland
- Primary destinations: County Meath; Enfield – leaves R148 at junction with the M4; County Kildare; Johnstown Bridge; Kilshanchoe; Carbury; R403; County Offaly; Edenderry – R401, R441; Crosses the Grand Canal; Ballyfore; R400; Daingean; Ballinagar; Terminates at the R420

Highway system
- Roads in Ireland; Motorways; Primary; Secondary; Regional

The R402 road is a regional road in Ireland, linking the M4 at Enfield, County Meath to the R420 east of Tullamore in County Offaly.

== Route ==
The official description of the R402 from the Roads Act 1993 (Classification of Regional Roads) Order 2012 reads:

R402: Innfield, County Meath — Ballina Cross, County Offaly

Between its junction with M4 at Newcastle in the county of Meath and its junction with R420 at Ballina Cross in the county of Offaly via Johnstown Bridge at the boundary between the county of Meath and the county Kildare: Ballynamullagh, Newbury Cross and Carbury in the county of Kildare: Kishawanny Bridge at the boundary between the county of Kildare and the county of Offaly: Coneyburrow Street, Father Kearns Street, J.K.L. Street and Saint Marys Street in the town of Edenderry; Killane Cross, Rathmore, Ballyfore Big, Eskermore, Ballycon, Killoneen; Main Street at Daingean; Clonad and Ballinagar in the county of Offaly.

The R402 is 45 kilometres (28 mi) long (map of the road).

== Improvements ==
Kildare County Council announced the award of a road building contract on 2 March 2012 for the R402 Enfield to Edenderry Improvement Scheme covering about 11 kilometres of the R402 and costing approximately €36.5 million for a two-year project. Carbury village will likely be bypassed by this new route. The scheme was originally expected to be completed in 2013 but the improvements will not be completed until 2014. Farmers with land along the route refused to allow road workers and county council officials to enter their lands in May 2008 because Kildare County Council had issued compulsory purchase orders without any prior consultation with the owners. The farmers declared that they would not allow work to proceed on their lands until procedures and a timetable for the purchase of the lands had been agreed.

== See also ==
- Roads in Ireland
- National primary road
- National secondary road
