= Knocknahur =

Knocknahur Cnoc na hIora Ransboro
- Village
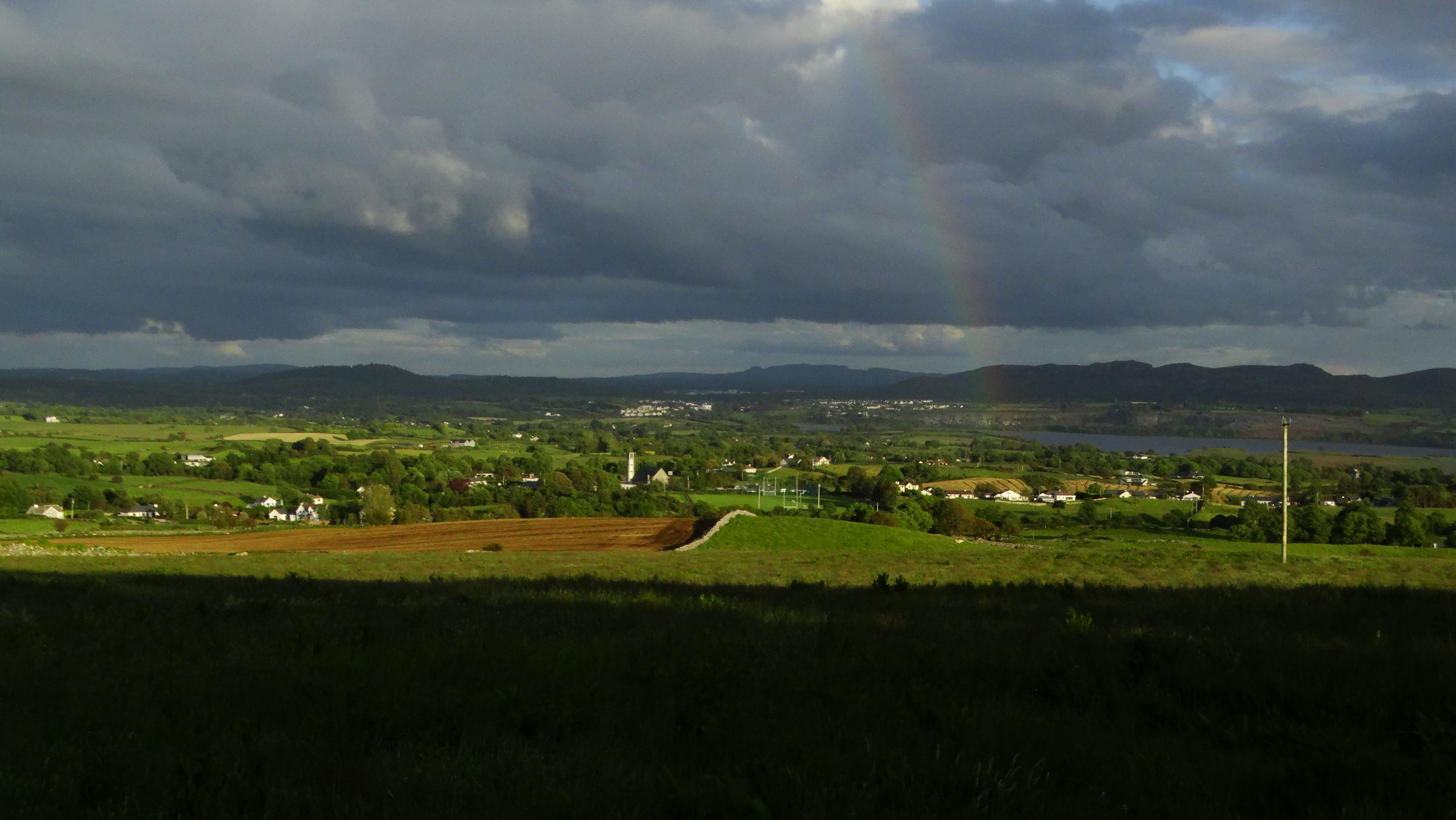
- Knocknahur area in June 2019

- Location in Ireland
- Coordinates: 54°14′42″N 8°32′19″W
- Country: Ireland
- Province: Connacht
- County: County Sligo
- Elevation: 39 m (128 ft)
- Time zone: UTC+0 (WET)
  - Summer (DST): UTC-1 (IST (WEST))
- Irish Grid Reference: G649330

Knocknahur (Irish: Cnoc na hIora, meaning 'hill of the surety'), also known as Ransboro, is a village in County Sligo, Ireland.

Evidence of ancient settlement in the area includes examples of ringforts, souterrains and enclosures in the neighbouring townlands of Knocknahur North and Knocknahur South. The megalithic complex at Carrowmore lies approximately 1 km east of the village.

The area is home to Ransboro National School, the church of Our Lady Star of the Sea (in the Roman Catholic Diocese of Elphin) and the grounds of Coolera/Strandhill GAA club at Ransboro Park.

== See also ==
- List of towns and villages in Ireland
- R292 road (Ireland)
