= Myrtleville =

Seaside village in County Cork, Ireland

Myrtleville Irish: Baile an Chuainín
- Townland
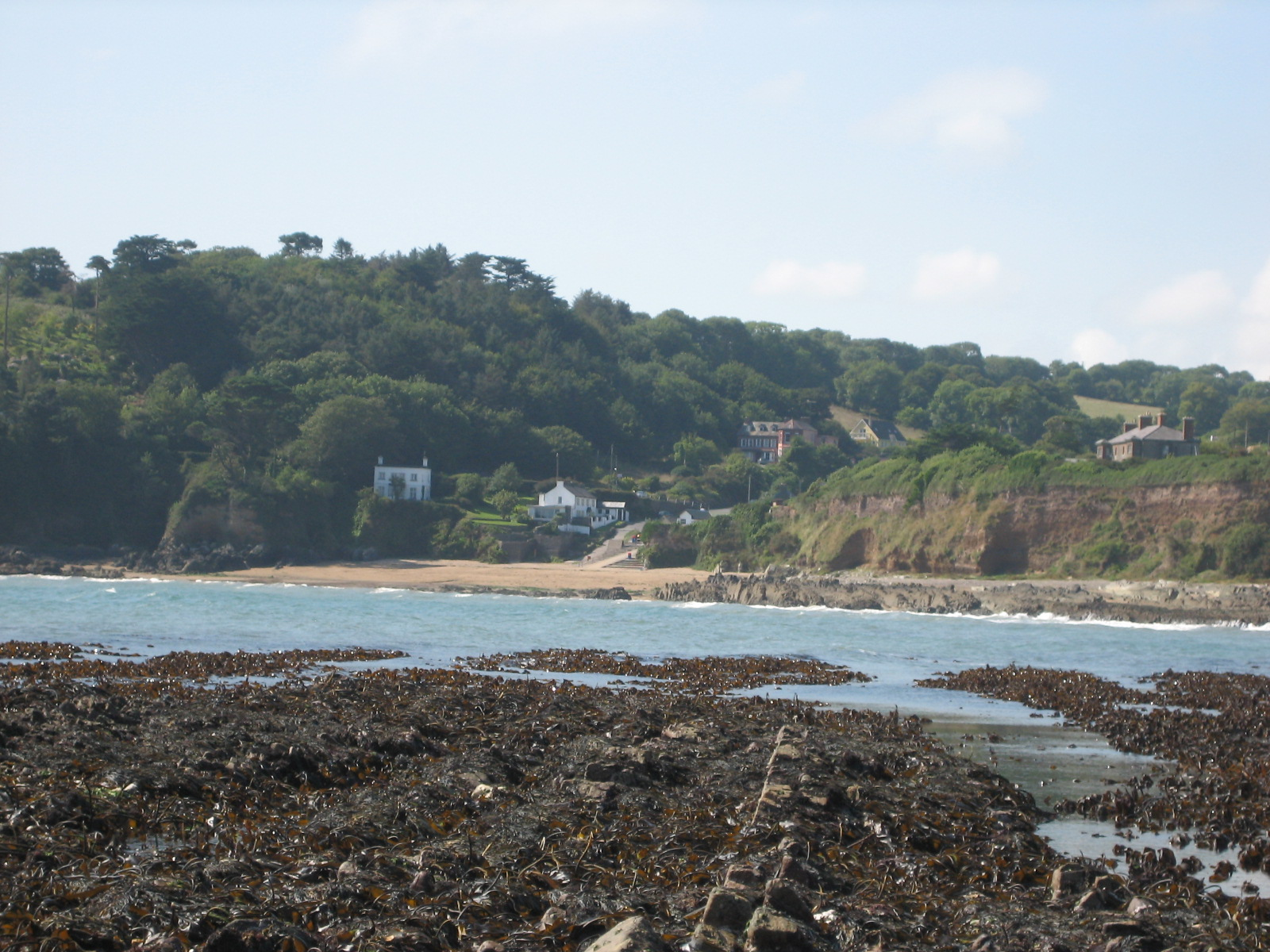
- Myrtleville Beach taken from Fennells' Bay

- Location in Ireland
- Coordinates: 51°46′58″N 08°17′46″W
- Country: Ireland
- Province: Munster
- County: County Cork
- Time zone: UTC+0 (WET)
  - Summer (DST): UTC-1 (IST (WEST))
- Eircode: P43

Myrtleville (Irish: Baile an Chuainín, meaning 'town of the small harbour') is a small seaside village in County Cork, Ireland. The village lies within the townlands of Ballinluska and Myrtleville, just west of the entrance to Cork Harbour. Myrtleville has one grocery shop, a pub, and a restaurant.

18th and 19th century records of the local estate houses associate Myrtleville House with the Daunt family. One of the other waterfront properties, Bunnyconnellan, developed around a cottage from 1824, operated for several decades as a restaurant, bar and a hotel until its closure in 2022. County development plans, including from the 1990s, allowed the building of modern houses with limitations ensuring the protection of the village's character, such as only allowing one-storey houses plus attic. Crosshaven rugby club has its sports ground at the top of Myrtleville hill.

The beach at Myrtleville is used by swimmers all year round, with frequent fundraising swims organized.

The northern part of the Myrtleville shore

== See also ==
- Fountainstown
- List of towns and villages in Ireland
