= Cloonbonniffe =

Village in County Roscommon, Ireland

Coordinates: 53.7815°N 8.5825°W

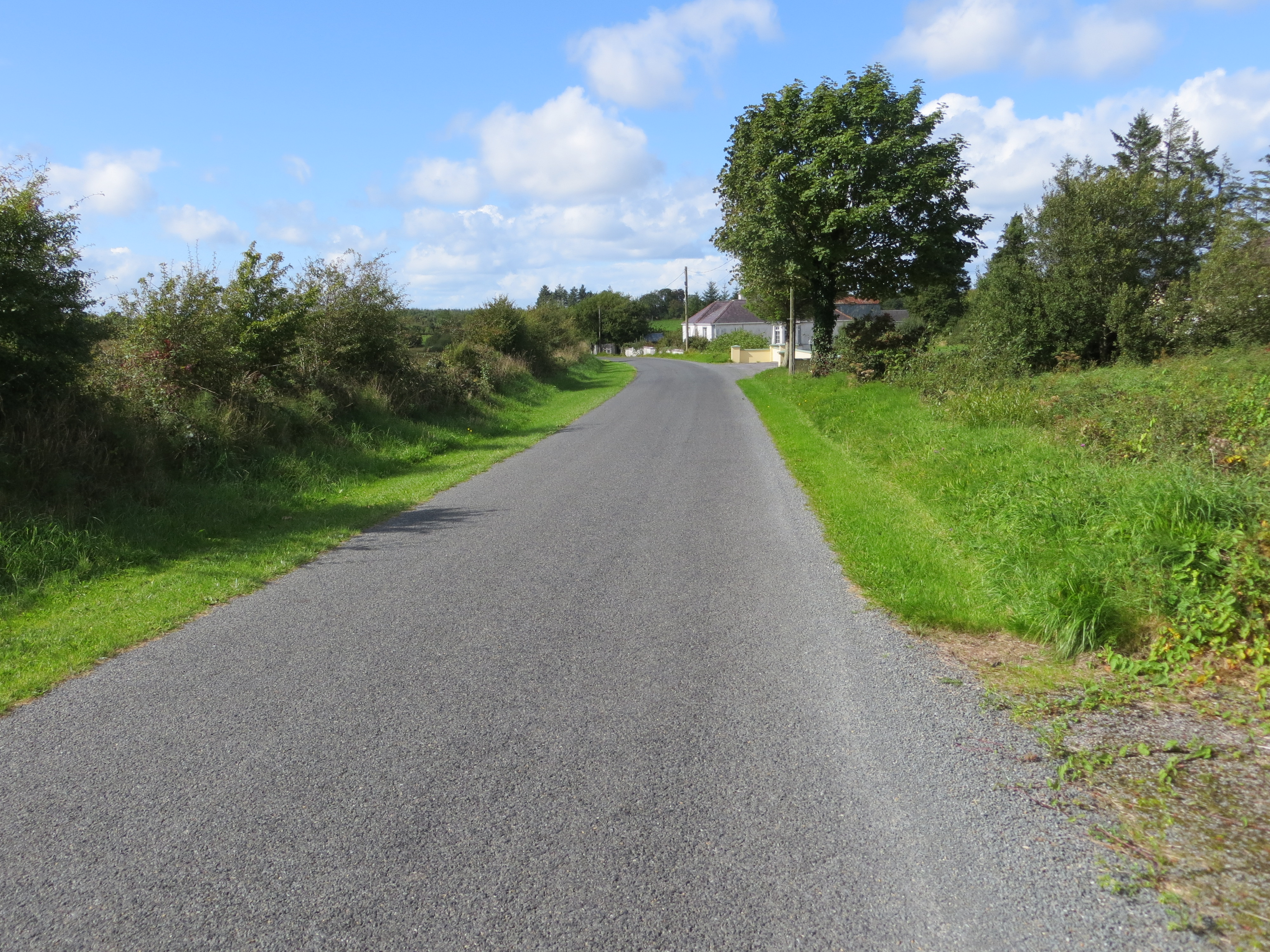
Road near Cloonbonniff

Cloonbonniffe, officially Cloonbonniff (Irish: Cluain Banbh), is a small village and townland in County Roscommon, Ireland. The nearest town is Castlerea, six kilometres east.

Cloonbonniff is home to the O'Connor Don National School and community centre, which is beside Cloonbonniffe Catholic Church.

== See also ==
- List of towns and villages in Ireland
