= Kilshanchoe =

Village in County Kildare, Ireland

Coordinates: 53°23′N 6°53′W

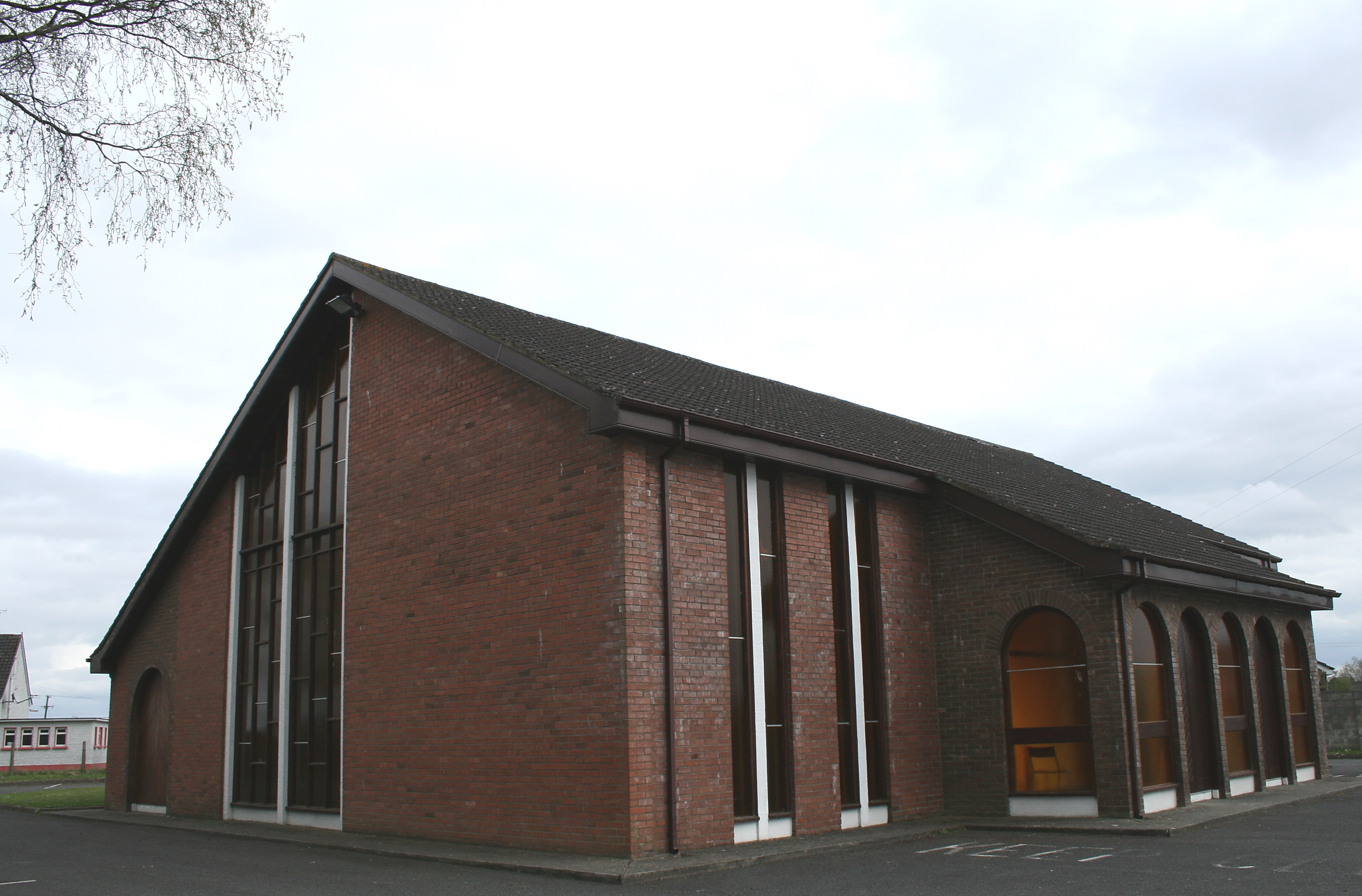
Kilshanchoe's modern Catholic Church

Kilshanchoe/Kilshanroe (Irish: Cill Seanchua) is a village in north County Kildare, Ireland. It is on the R402 regional road, roughly midway between Enfield and Carbury. It has an area of 1.0267 km^{2} (0.40 mi^{2})

== See also ==
- List of towns and villages in Ireland
