= St Conleth's Reformatory School =

Former military barracks and reformatory school in County Offaly, Ireland

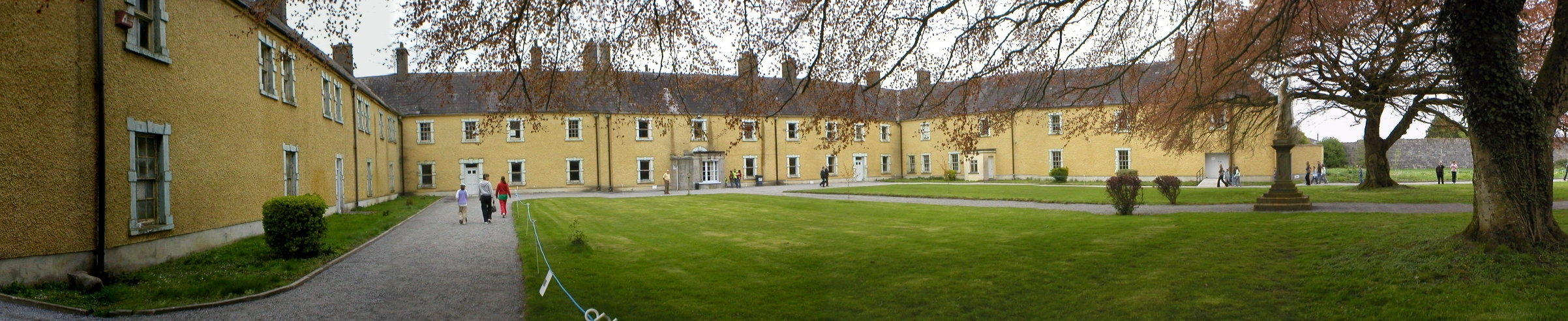
The Daingean Reformatory

St. Conleth's Reformatory School was a reformatory in Daingean, County Offaly which operated from 1870 to 1973. It was run by the Missionary Oblates of Mary Immaculate.

The campus was formerly constructed as a military barracks around 1800, but was converted to a reformatory school around 1870.

Unlike industrial schools in Ireland, boys at this school were convicted of offences that would have resulted in prison or penal servitude had they been committed by adults. The school was one of those covered by the Ryan Commission investigation of child abuse at reformatory and industrial schools.

The complex is now used as a storage facility for the National Museum of Ireland and is owned by the Office of Public Works.
