= Ivarstown =

Village in County Clare, Ireland

Coordinates: 52°44′35″N 8°46′21″W

Ivarstown (Irish: Baile an hÍomhar) is a small village in County Clare, Munster in Ireland. The village covered a total area of 13 acres (53,000 m^{2}) and was located within the parish of Kilfinaghta, in the baronry of Lower Bunratty. It takes its name from the Ievers family and is located on the opposite bank of the O'Garney river from the village of Sixmilebridge.

== See also ==
- List of towns and villages in Ireland
