= Sandpit, County Louth =

Village in County Louth, Ireland

Coordinates: 53.7703°N 6.3089°W

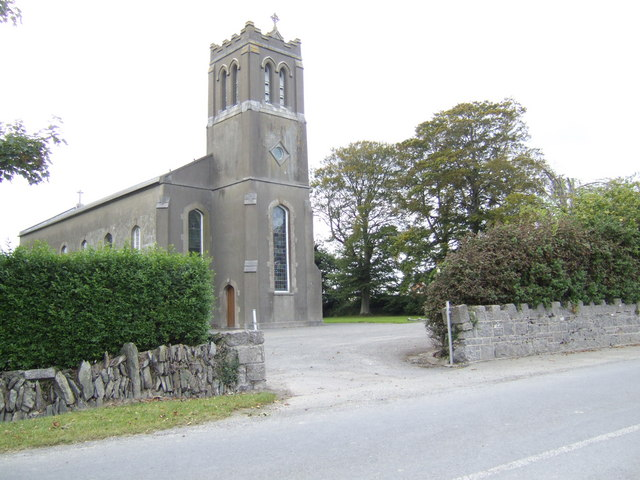
Catholic church in Sandpit, County Louth

Sandpit (Irish: Clais an Ghainimh) is a small village in the rural hinterland of Drogheda in County Louth, Ireland. It lies in the townland of Milltown, which had a population of 213 as of the 2011 census.

== Location ==
Sandpit is located approximately 6 kilometres (4 mi) north of Drogheda, off the road to Termonfeckin. The village lies in civil parish of Termonfeckin, between the M1 motorway and the coast, where there are beaches and golf courses at Baltray and Seapoint.

== Amenities ==
Within the village is a 19th-century church, a small supermarket, and the local national (primary) school. Also nearby is a community hall, which is used by some local organisations and houses a playschool.

The Catholic church, the Church of the Assumption, is in Termonfechin parish in the Roman Catholic Archdiocese of Armagh.

Sandpit National School, which was founded in 1956, had an enrollment of approximately 260 pupils in 2012.

== See also ==
- List of towns and villages in Ireland
