= Inch, County Wexford =

Village in County Wexford, Ireland

Inch An Inis
- Village
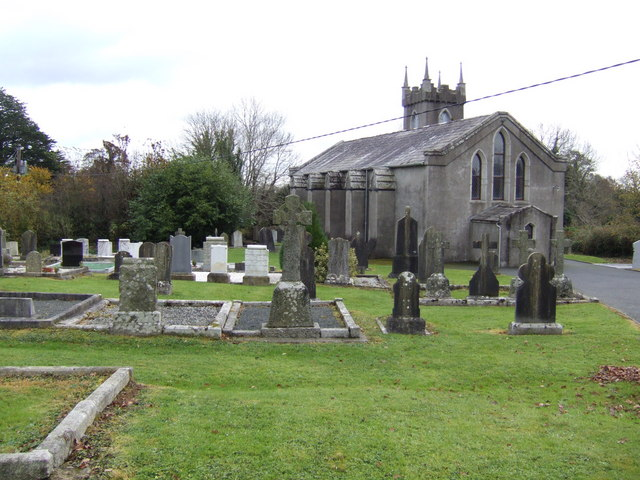
- The church in Inch

- Location in Ireland
- Coordinates: 52°44′24″N 6°14′17″W
- Country: Ireland
- Province: Leinster
- County: County Wexford
- Elevation: 48 m (157 ft)
- Time zone: UTC+0 (WET)
  - Summer (DST): UTC-1 (IST (WEST))
- Irish Grid Reference: T187669

Inch (Irish: An Inis or Inse Mocholmóg) is located in County Wexford, Ireland on the R772 road between Arklow and Gorey. In September 2007 Inch was bypassed, having formerly been on the N11 Dublin to Wexford road. There is a creamery in Inch run by Glanbia.

Nearby villages include Castletown and Coolgreany.

== Transport ==
=== Rail ===
Inch had a station on the Dublin to Rosslare railway line, but the station is now closed. Inch railway station opened on 1 July 1885, closed for goods traffic on 9 June 1947, and finally closed altogether on 30 March 1964.

=== Bus ===
Inch is served by a Local Link bus on Tuesdays linking it to Gorey via Castletown. Until 2012 Inch was served by Bus Éireann route 2, which then operated between Dublin Airport and Rosslare Harbour. Previously, the number of services through Inch was reduced from 18 January 2009 following the implementation of a new timetable.

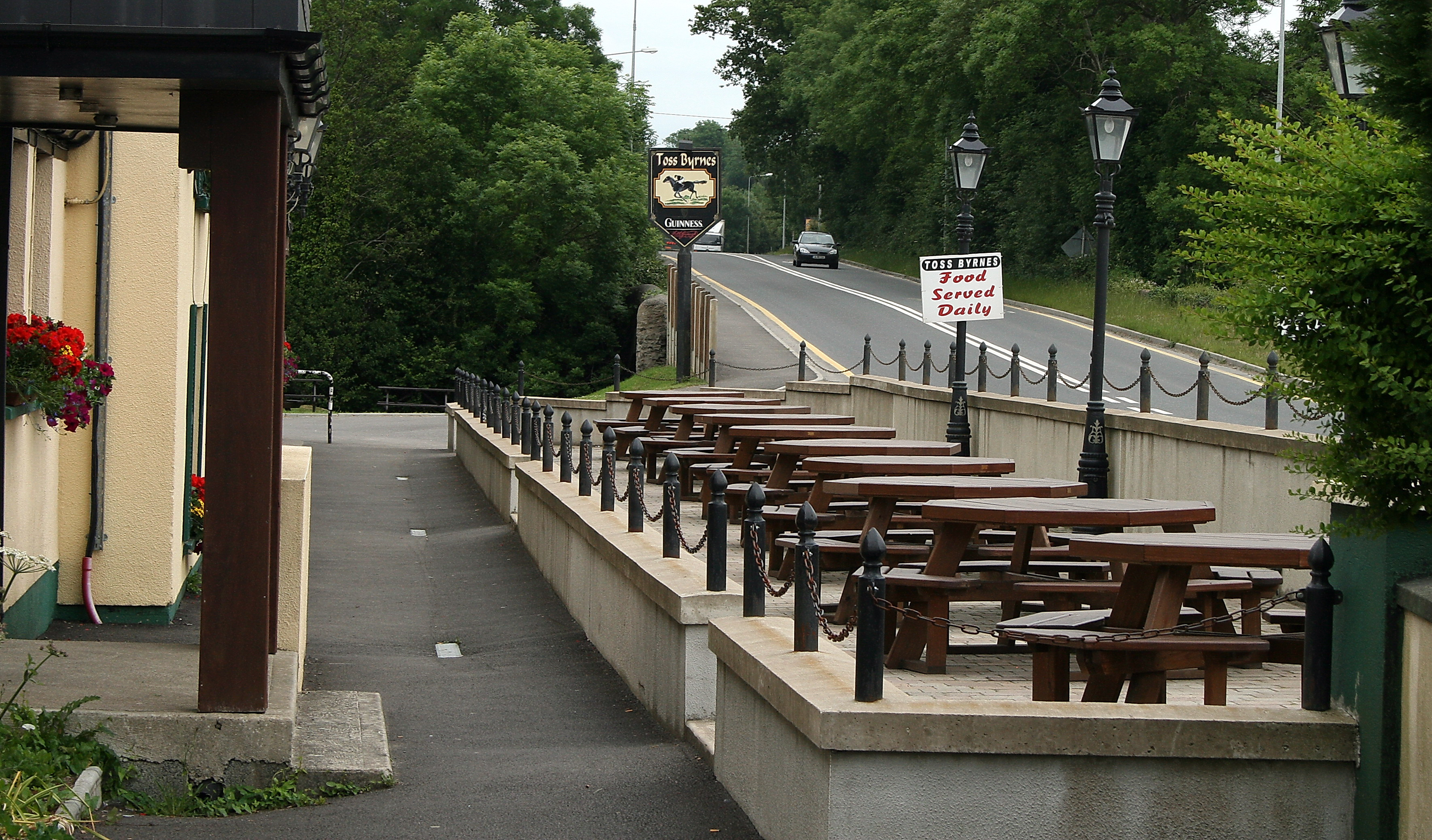
The R772 passes Toss Byrnes pub in Inch

== See also ==
- List of towns and villages in Ireland
- Inch, County Clare
