= Rathnaconeen =

Townland in County Mayo, Ireland

Coordinates: 54.08962°N 9.16166°W

Rathnaconeen (Irish: Ráth na gCoinín, meaning 'ringfort of the rabbits') is a small townland outside the town of Ballina, County Mayo, Ireland. It is in the parish of Knockmore.

The village's Irish name comes from the traditionally high number of rabbits in the area, and also the location of a very visible ringfort at the top of the hill in the village. There was also possibly another fort at the top of the same hill.

Historically, Rathnaconeen was in the old parish of Ballinahaglish, which was in the barony of Lord Tirawley. Following the Poor law union of 1852, it was designated as an area of Ballina but was redesignated as an electoral division of Rural Ballina in 1898. It belongs to the electoral area with node ID 243 called Ballina Rural. Surrounding areas include Carrowntreilla, Rehins, Ballinahaglish, the Commons and Behybaun.

The population of the townland has been traced since 1841 when a population of 53 lived in incredibly only 5 houses. After the famine, the population dropped considerably, being only 18 approximately 30 years later. The population subsequently rose, and now it stands at almost 75, with around 30 houses.

Rathnaconeen is a cul-de-sac which stretches for about 1 kilometre (0.62 mi). The townland is built along the River Moy, the banks of which can walked right into the village. The area's upkeep is aided by a grant from the County Council.

The townland has a church devoted to the Jehovah's Witnesses faith, a multi-million euro concrete business, a car showroom, two vehicle workshops as well as an agri-hire business. The area is located 2 kilometres (1.2 mi) from Ballina town centre just off the N57. The Ramada Manor Court Hotel is metres away from the end of Rathnaconeen Road, as is Rehins school. The view from the top of Rathnaconeen hill takes in the railroad tracks and the mountain of Nephin. On the opposite view are the Ox Mountains.

== See also ==
- List of towns and villages in Ireland
