= Fountainstown =

Seaside village in County Cork, Ireland

Fountainstown Baile Mhóntáin (Irish)
- Village
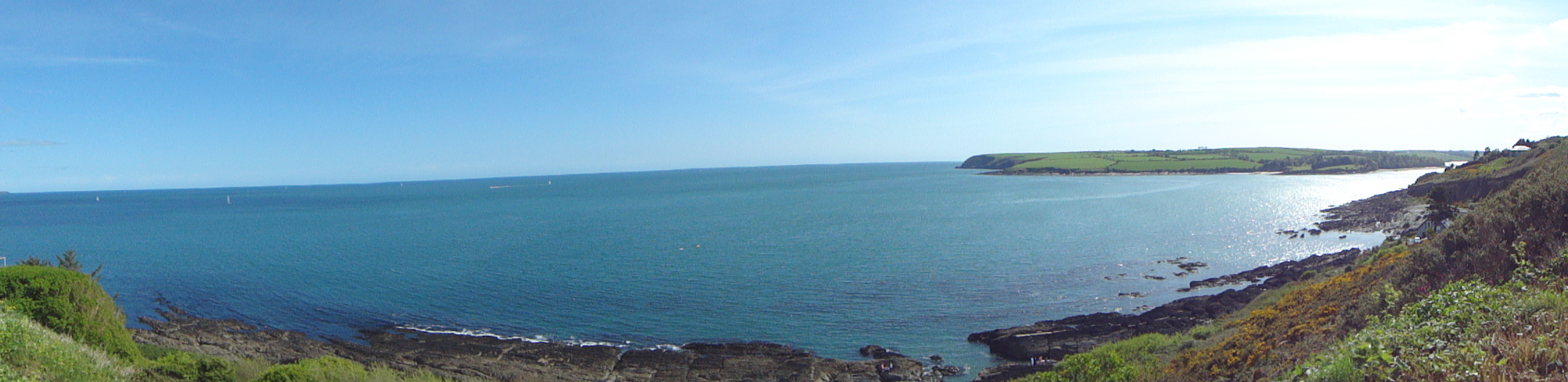
- Ringabella Bay from Fountainstown

- Location in Ireland
- Coordinates: 51°46′33″N 08°18′41″W
- Country: Ireland
- Province: Munster
- County: Cork
- Elevation: 30 m (98 ft)

Population (2016)
  - Total: 993
- (includes the nearby village of Myrtleville)
- Time zone: UTC+0 (WET)
  - Summer (DST): UTC+1 (IST (WEST))
- Irish Grid Reference: W785582

Fountainstown (Irish: Baile Mhóntáin, historically anglicised as Ballymontane) is a coastal village in County Cork, Ireland, situated approximately 23 km south of Cork city. A seaside village, it is separated by small promontory headland from the nearby village and beach at Myrtleville.

== Places of interest ==
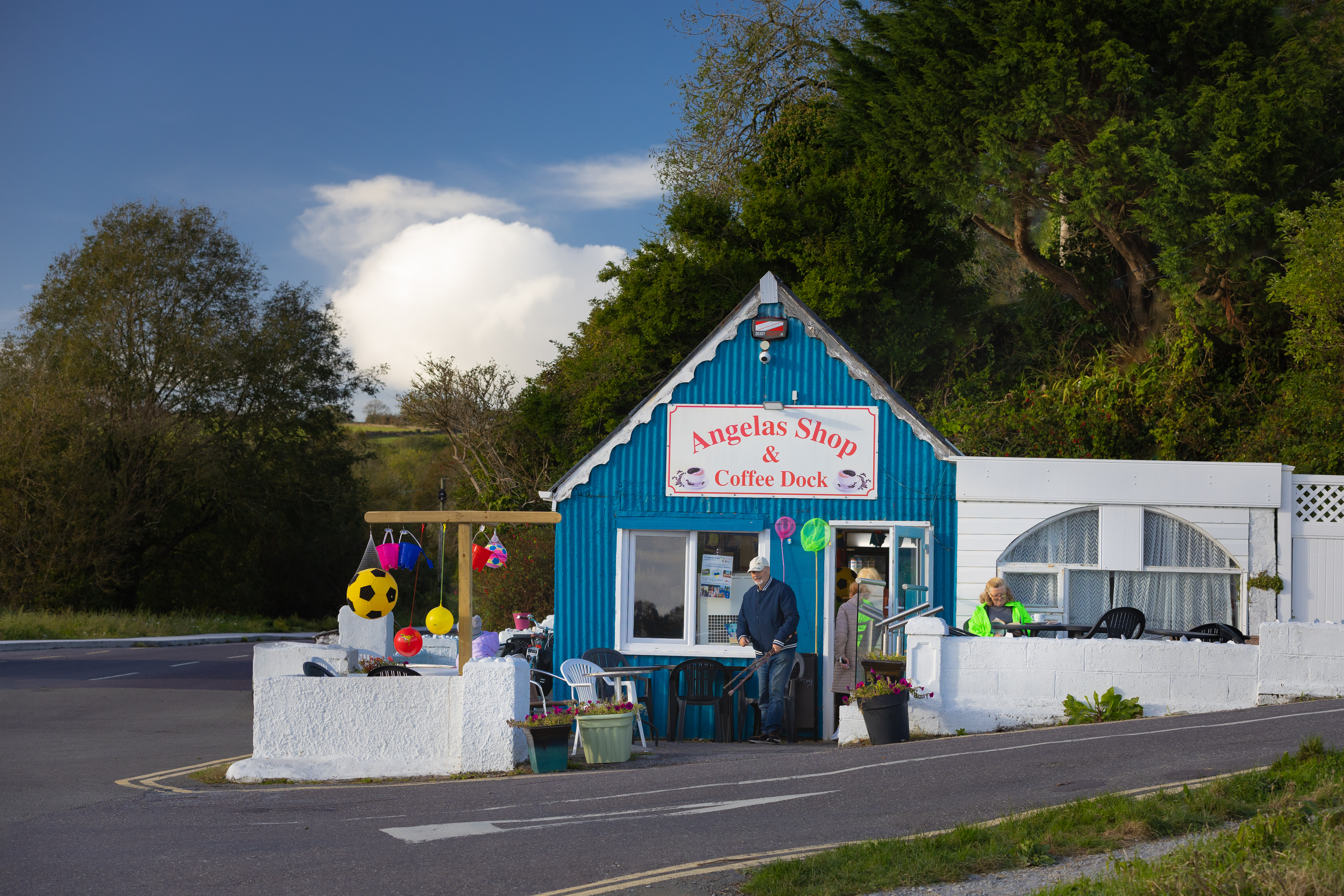
Angelas Shop & Coffee Dock

Fountainstown is a seaside village and its beach received Blue Flag status in 1991. It overlooks Ringabella creek to the south.

Close to the village centre is Fountainstown House, a stately home which was originally built in 1699 by the Roche family - a Norman family who may have acquired lands at Fountainstown in the 15th or 16th century. The house has 12 bedrooms and was restored in 1995.

Fountainstown's pitch and putt club, established in 1936, is sometimes considered to be the home of the sport's first course, and described by the European Pitch and Putt Association as the origin point of "modern day organised competitive Pitch and Putt". The club was initially established by "Fountainstown Developments Limited", a company with most of the town's residents as shareholders. This club, known locally as "Fountainstown Sports Club", declined in the 1950s and 1960s, due to a "lack of interest and insufficient willing hands", before being revived in 1973. New rounds of funding helped revitalise the club grounds in the 2020s. Adjoining the pitch and putt fields are tennis courts, with the tennis club having been established at the same time as the pitch and putt one. The Fountainstown Developments company has also organised sailing, swimming and fishing activities. The clubhouse has been used for social activities including dancing and Catholic masses.

The coast road between Fountainstown and nearby Myrtleville is used as a walk or promenade. Near the start of this road, on the Fountainstown side, is Angelas Shop & Coffee Dock. The owner of this small shop, which has been in operation since the late 1980s, received a Cork Person of the Year award in January 2023. The shop's owner has also reportedly sponsored local road bowling tournaments.

== Transport ==
Fountainstown is served by a number of bus routes, with 12 services a day to Cork, each operating via Carrigaline and Douglas, and several services operating via Crosshaven.

The nearest airport is Cork Airport.

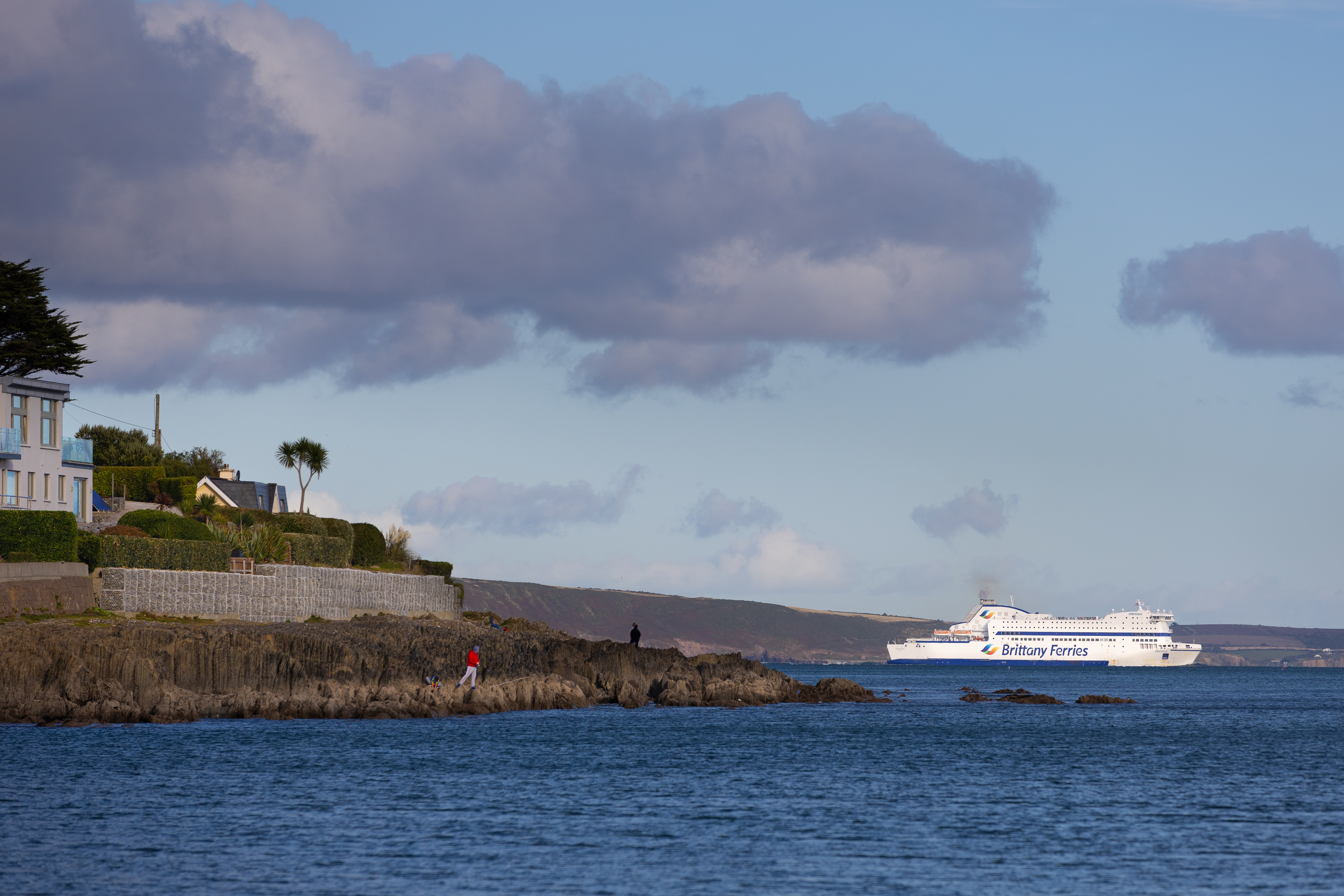
Ringabella Bay as seen from Fountainstown Beach, with Brittany Ferries ferry departing from Ringaskiddy visible

== See also ==
- List of towns and villages in Ireland
