= Riverquarter =

- Location in Ireland
- Coordinates: 52°19′N 7°17′W
- Country: Ireland
- Province: Leinster
- County: County Kilkenny
- Time zone: UTC+0 (WET)
  - Summer (DST): UTC-1 (IST (WEST))

Riverquarter is a small hamlet in the south of Kilkenny in Southeast Ireland. Within the townland of Clonmore, it is part of the Catholic parish and electoral district of Mooncoin.

The area overlooks the River Suir, and the river can be reached from a minor access road.

== See also ==
- List of towns and villages in Ireland
- List of Market Houses in Ireland
