= Bealadangan =

Village in County Galway, Ireland

Béal an Daingin Bealadangan
- Village
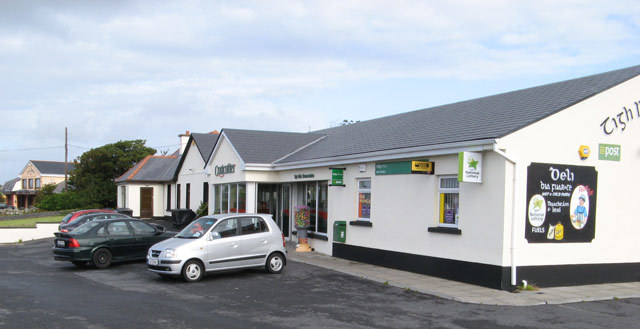
- Shop and post office at Béal an Daingin

- Location in Ireland
- Coordinates: 53°18′50″N 9°36′59″W
- Country: Ireland
- Province: Connacht
- County: County Galway
- Elevation: 1 m (3.3 ft)
- Irish Grid Reference: L922305
- As this is a Gaeltacht village, the Irish Béal an Daingin is the only official name. The anglicized spelling Bealadangan has no official standing.

Béal an Daingin or Béal a' Daingin (meaning "mouth of the stronghold", anglicized as Bealadangan) is a small Gaeltacht village in Connemara, County Galway, Ireland.

The primary spoken language is Irish, and all but a few of the elderly population also speak English. A pub, a post office and a primary school (Scoil an Tuairín) are within a few miles. Other nearby villages are Leitir Móir and An Cheathrú Rua.

Diarmuid Mac an Adhastair (1943–2015), born in Béal an Daingin, was an actor in the TV drama Ros na Rún.

== See also ==
- List of towns and villages in Ireland
