= H. Augustus and Agnes Cleveland O'Dell House =

- H. Augustus and Agnes Cleveland O'Dell House-Inch House
- U.S. National Register of Historic Places
- Interactive map
- Location: 1945 Tiverton Rd., Bloomfield Hills, Michigan
- Coordinates: 42°35′17″N 83°14′42″W
- Area: 1.4 acres (0.57 ha)
- Built: 1926
- Architect: H. Augustus O'Dell
- Architectural style: English Cottage
- NRHP reference No.: 09000129
- Added to NRHP: March 17, 2009

The H. Augustus and Agnes Cleveland O'Dell House, also known as the Inch House, is a single family home located at 1945 Tiverton Road in Bloomfield Hills, Michigan. The house was designed by architect H. Augustus O'Dell for his personal use, and was listed on the National Register of Historic Places in 2009.

== History ==
H. Augustus O'Dell was born in 1875, in what is now Port Huron, Michigan. He started his architectural career in 1893 as a draftsman in the Port Huron office of George L. Harvey, In 1895 he moved to Detroit, working as a draftsman for Malcomson and Higginbotham, Rogers and MacFarlane, and theatre architect James M. Wood. In 1902, O'Dell established his own firm, Baxter & O'Dell, in partnership with Frank G. Baxter. The firm was successful, and O'Dell became known for his designs of apartment buildings and large suburban houses.

In the late nineteenth century, this area of Bloomfield Hills started becoming suburbanized and transportation made it more accessible to Detroit. Charles Stinchfield, Sr., a wealthy timber man and president of American Radiator Company, established "Stonycroft," a 286-acre working farm on this site. In 1925, Stinchfield's heirs platted and landscaped the farm into a real estate development. O'Dell and his wife Agnes purchased this lot, among the first to be sold. The house was constructed in 1926, and O'Dell named it the "Inch House" after the O'Dell family ancestral home in Athy, Ireland. O'Dell lived there from 1926 to 1943.

== Description ==
The O'Dell House is a two-story L-shaped house with intersecting gable roofs. It has a mixture of French Eclectic and English Cottage styling, with a dominant, steep, undulating roof sheathed with textured slate. The roofline is broken by dormers with wooden windows. The front facade is made of concrete block, with a protruding entry vestibule of brick. A patio, pool house and pool are behind the house.

== See also ==
- National Register of Historic Places listings in Oakland County, Michigan
