= Ballynacregga =

Ballynacregga Baile na Creige
- Town
- Location in Ireland
- Coordinates: 53.441167°N 9.164783°W
- Country: Ireland
- Province: Connacht
- County: County Galway
- Time zone: UTC+0 (WET)
  - Summer (DST): UTC-1 (IST (WEST))

Ballynacregga (Irish: Baile na Creige) is a town in County Galway, Ireland. Ballynacregga is on the eastern shore of Lough Corrib. It is in a northern part of County Galway, near the border of County Mayo.

== History ==
In 1901, eight households lived in Ballynacregga. In 1911, that number had increased to ten households. The population was listed as 33 individuals in both years.

The Irish language town name, Baile na Creige, means "town of the rock" in English.

== Irish language ==
Ballynacregga had a large Irish-speaking population in the early 1900s. Most people in the town spoke both Irish and English. A few older residents only spoke Irish. This chart is a breakdown of how Ballynacregga residents responded to the census category, "Write the word "IRISH" in this column opposite the name of each person who speaks IRISH only, and the words "IRISH & ENGLISH" opposite the names of those who can speak both languages. In other cases no entry should be made in this column." in 1901 and 1911.

Irish speakers in Ballynacregga, 1901 and 1911
| Census year | Irish and English | Irish only | No response |
|---|---|---|---|
| 1901 | 25 | 1 | 7 |
| 1911 | 29 | 1 | 3 |
