= Meenagolan =

Townland in County Donegal, Ireland

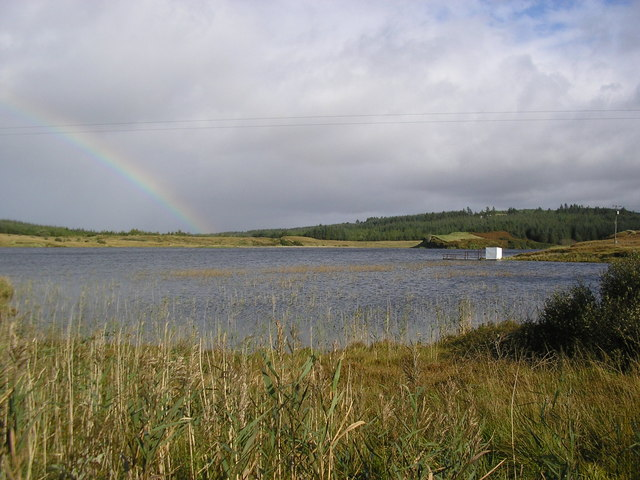
Croagh Lough

Meenagolan (Irish: Mín na Gualann, meaning 'field of the shoulder') is a townland in Southwest of County Donegal, Ireland in the civil and church parish of Killaghtee. The main geographical feature is Croagh Lough. The lough is currently used as a reservoir for the nearby town of Ardara.

Large tracts of the townland are now owned by Coillte, the Irish forestry state body, and planted with fir.
