= Coolgreany =

Village in County Wexford, Ireland

Coolgreany Cúil Ghréine
- Village
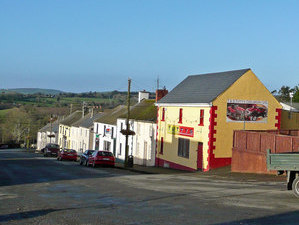
- Coolgreany village

- Location in Ireland
- Coordinates: 52°45′54″N 6°14′02″W
- Country: Ireland
- Province: Leinster
- County: County Wexford
- Elevation: 48 m (157 ft)

Population (2016)
  - Total: 376
- Time zone: UTC+0 (WET)
  - Summer (DST): UTC-1 (IST (WEST))
- Irish Grid Reference: T181683

Coolgreany (Irish: Cúil Ghréine, meaning 'nook of the sun') is a village located in north County Wexford in Ireland, in the shadow of Croghan Mountain, overlooking Tara Hill in the extreme north of County Wexford.

The village is located about 3 km from the N11 Dublin-Wexford road at Inch. Amenities include a Gaelic Athletic Association pitch, handball alley, a grocery store, two pubs (public houses) and national (primary) school. The primary school opened in the early 1980s. A fire closed the grocery store in December 2025.

Nearby major towns are Arklow and Gorey.

Historically the village is known for the evictions of 1887.

== See also ==
- List of towns and villages in Ireland
