= Shammer =

Village in County Mayo, Ireland

Coordinates: 53°52′46″N 8°50′55″W

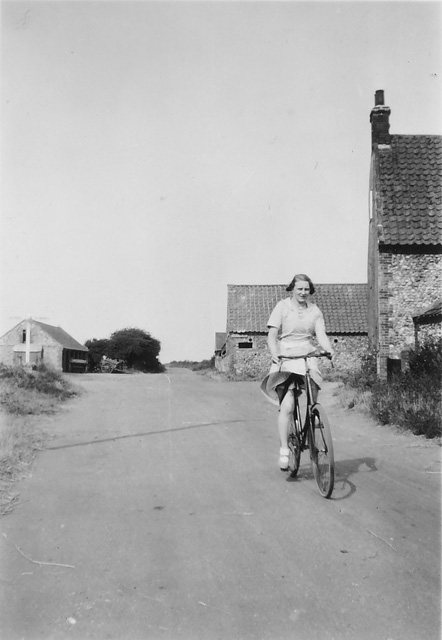
1935

Shammer is a small village beside the village of Kilkelly in County Mayo, Ireland. Shammer is 3 km south of Knock Airport.

== See also ==
- List of towns and villages in Ireland
