= Carra Castle, Antrim =

Castle Carra
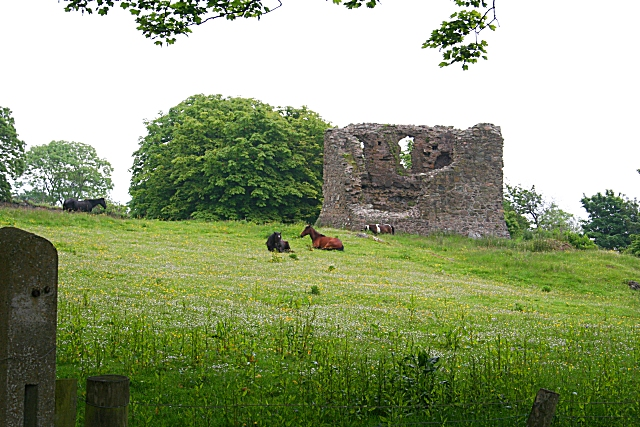

- Location within Northern Ireland

General information
- Type: Ruined castle
- Location: Near Cushendun, County Antrim, Northern Ireland
- Coordinates: 55°7′57.5″N 6°2′29.4″W

Carra Castle or Castle Carra (Irish: Caisleán Carrach) is a ruined castle, just north of Cushendun, County Antrim, Northern Ireland. It dates to around the early 14th century. The castle lies in a field near the coast and the harbour of Cushendun. The site had once been used during medieval times as a children's cemetery.

== Etymology ==
Carra may be a corruption of "Carey". It may have been known as Goban Saer's Castle.

== History ==
The castle was once occupied by Irish king Shane O'Neill, and Sorley Boy McDonnell was held as a prisoner here in 1565. In 1567, two years after being defeated by O'Neill, the McDonnells entertained him in Castle Carra during two days of hunting and feasting. However, on the third day, 2 June, during a quarrel, they stabbed O'Neill to death to avenge their earlier defeat and sent his head to the English representatives of Queen Elizabeth in Dublin Castle.

In 1585, Donnell Gorm MacDonnell was besieged by the English; his father, Sorley Boy landed near the castle and drove off the besiegers. Around 1730, it was known to have been occupied by the Lynch family. Today the castle is in ruins and overgrown with ivy.

== Architecture and fittings ==
The house has the characteristics of a hall house, but its outside dimensions are that of a tower house. What remains are the ruins of a 16th-century square tower house built over a Mesolithic flint working site.
