= Insh =

Coordinates: 57.091187°N 3.955551°W

Insh: Scottish Gaelic: Am Baile Ùr
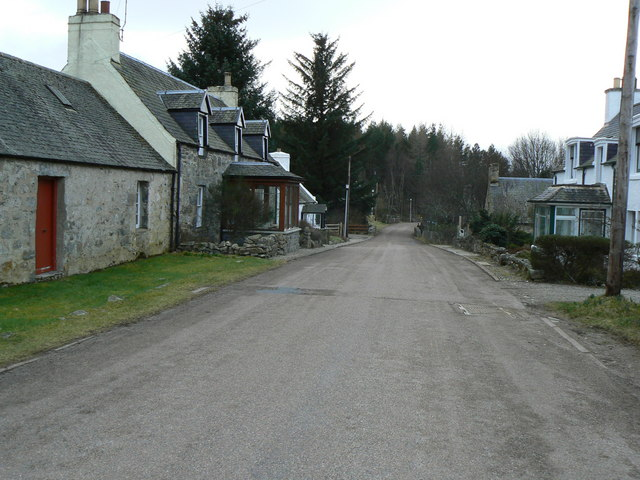

- Location within the Highland council area
- OS grid reference: NH815016
- Council area: Highland
- Country: Scotland
- Sovereign state: United Kingdom
- Post town: KINGUSSIE
- Postcode district: PH21
- Dialling code: 01540
- Police: Scotland
- Fire: Scottish
- Ambulance: Scottish
- UK Parliament: Inverness, Nairn, Badenoch and Strathspey
- Scottish Parliament: Skye, Lochaber and Badenoch

Insh (Scottish Gaelic: Am Baile Ùr) is a village in Highland, Scotland that lies on the east coast of the Insh Marshes. It is in the Badenoch and Strathspey area, around 3 1/2 miles (5.5 kilometres) east of Kingussie, in the Spey valley. It is located in historic Inverness-shire. The B970 road from Kingussie to Kincraig and Aviemore passes through the village. At the other side of the valley is the major A9 road from Inverness to the Central Belt. Along the road towards Ruthven Barracks is the small Speyside Distillery.

== Location ==
Insh is noteworthy as the location of the RSPB Insh Marshes Wildlife Reserve. At nearby Loch Insh it is possible to take part in various watersports, including windsurfing and sailing. There are also walking routes in the woods around Insh.

Insh contains a small church. There was once a school in the village, but it is no longer there. The building that once contained one of the oldest inns in the area has been converted into a house named ‘Rose Cottage’. It is the building next to the telephone box.
