= Inch, County Clare =

Village in County Clare, Ireland

Inch An Inse
- Village
- Location in Ireland
- Coordinates: 52°49′20″N 9°03′33″W
- Country: Ireland
- Province: Munster
- County: County Clare
- Time zone: UTC+0 (WET)
  - Summer (DST): UTC-1 (IST (WEST))
- Irish Grid Reference: R258774

Inch (Irish: An Inse) is a village in County Clare, in Ireland. It is around 5.5 kilometres (3.4 mi) south-west of Ennis town centre, on the R474 Ennis to Milltown Malbay road. Inch has a church, primary school and several bed and breakfasts.

The village of Inch is in the parish of Inch and Kilmaley in the Roman Catholic Diocese of Killaloe. Parish churches are Our Lady of the Wayside in Inch, St John the Baptist in Kilmaley and St Michael the Archangel in Connolly.
