= Kilmaley =

Village in County Clare, Ireland

Kilmaley Cill Mháille
- Village
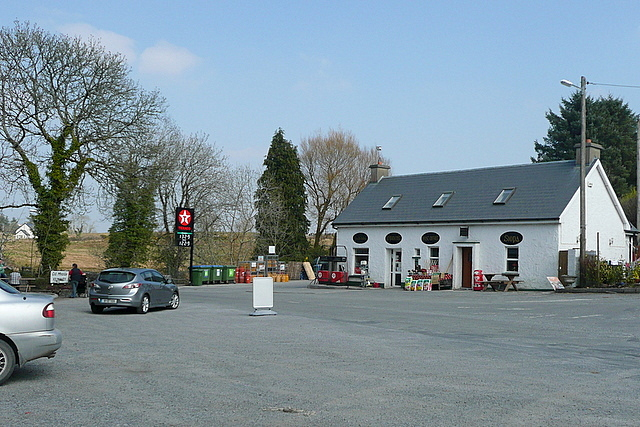

- Location in Ireland
- Coordinates: 52°49′04″N 9°06′33″W
- Country: Ireland
- Province: Munster
- County: County Clare
- Elevation: 70 m (230 ft)

Population (2022)
  - Total: 296
- Time zone: UTC+0 (WET)
  - Summer (DST): UTC-1 (IST (WEST))
- Irish Grid Reference: R258774

Kilmaley (Irish: Cill Mháille) is a village in County Clare, Ireland, 8 km (5 mi) west of Ennis. The name is from the Irish language Cill Mháille or 'church of (Saint) Maley'.

== Geography ==
The Kilmaley River runs through the village. Kilmaley is in the barony of Islands, much of whose land is moor or mountain. There is forestry, in which you can go on short trails and many lakes for fishing.

There was a castle at Ballymacooda that in 1580 belonged to the Baron of Inchiquin.

=== Kilmaley Parish ===
The Kilmaley Parish area is the largest in County Clare. Every hill in the parish holds the remains of an ancient fort or rath, over 30 in total. As at 1845, the parish was crossed by the road from Ennis to Milltown Malbay.

In the 1830s fairs were held at Cornally four times a year. In 1841 the population was 4,908 in 758 houses.

== Sports ==
The Kilmaley Gaelic Athletic Association (GAA) club was senior champions of Clare in 1985 and 2004.

There are two sport fields in Kilmaley. The main field is a GAA field and the second is located behind Kilmaley National School and is used for hurling and camogie. Athletics is also very prominent where St. Cronans Athletic club lead the way in activities.

== Religion ==
Kilmaley church was established in 1195 by Domnall Mór Ua Briain, King of Limerick and Thomond. He placed it in the charge of the Augustinians. In 1893 only part of the old church was still standing. Nearby there was a large cemetery and not far away two holy wells. The modern Catholic parish of Kilmaley, Inch and Connolly is in the Roman Catholic Diocese of Killaloe, and has its parish office is in the Parochial House, Kilmaley. Churches in the parish include Our Lady of the Wayside in Inch, St John the Baptist in Kilmaley and St Michael the Archangel in Connolly.

== Amenities ==
There are three primary schools in the parish of Kilmaley, Inch and Connolly: Kilmaley National School, Connolly National School and Inch National School. Two other schools, Kinkurk National School and Lisroe National School, closed in 1969 and 1970 respectively due to low class numbers. There is also a playschool or crèche located adjacent to Kilmaley National School and the main parish church (St Johns Church).

There are three pubs and three shops in the Kilmaley Parish area. Other local businesses including a number of local tractor and car repair garages.

== Townlands ==
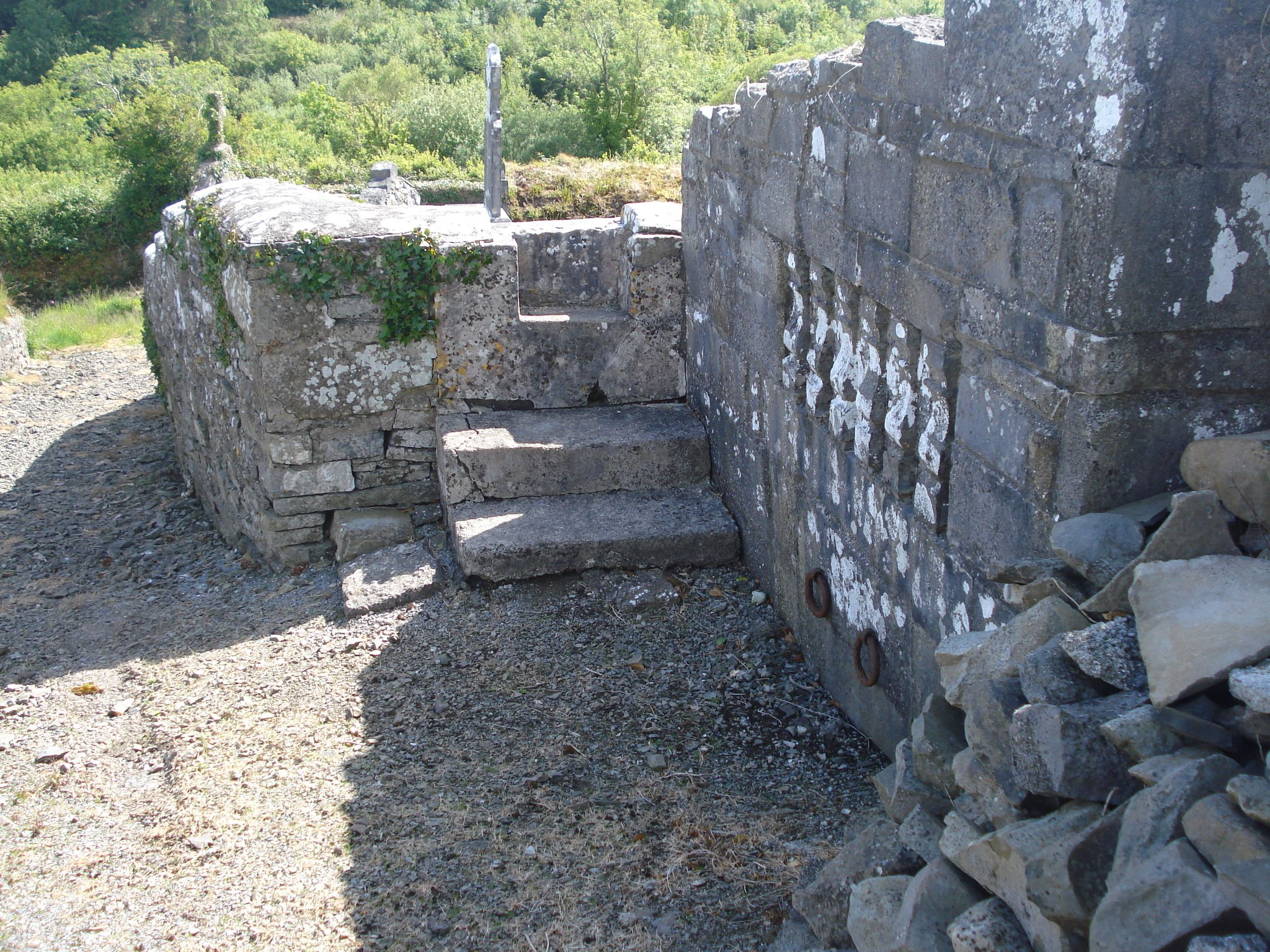
Old Kilmaley Graveyard, rings for horses

There are 54 Townlands in the parish, these are Ailldavore, Balleen, Ballydonohoe, Ballyillaun, Ballymacaula, Ballymacooda, Ballyvoe, Bealcragga, Booltiagh, Boolybrien, Boolynaknockaun, Boolynagleragh, Boolyneaska, Caherea, Cahermore, Cappalea North, Cappalea South, Carncreagh, Cloonlaheen, Cloontabonniv, Cloonbooly, Culleen, Derrynacarragh, Drumanure, Drumatehy, Feighroe, Furroor, Garrynagry, Glenletternafinny, Gortaganniv, Kilcloher, Kilcolumb, Kilmaley, Kinturk, Knockadangan, Knockatunna, Knockmore, Knockmoy, Kyleatunna, Lehaknock, Lecarrow Beg, Lecarrow More, Letteragh, Lisbiggeen, Lispuckaun, Lisroe, Loughburke, Magowna, Rathcrony, Reanagishagh, Sheeaun, Slaghbooly, Slievealoughaun and Tullaghaboy.
