= Gowlan West =

Village in County Galway, Ireland

Coordinates: 53.4855°N 9.9690°W

Footpath and cycleway alongside the N59 in Gowlan West townland

Goulane West or Gowlan West (Irish: An Gabhlán Thiar) is a townland located approximately 3.5 kilometres (2 mi) east of Clifden in County Galway, Ireland. It is within the electoral division of Derrylea and the civil parish of Moyrus. The townland lies beside the N59 national secondary road. To the south is Killywongaun and a by-road which leads to Clifden and the Dooneen area. The name An Gabhlán means "the small fork". As of the 2011 census, the townland of Gowlan West had a population of 87 people.

The townland of Gowlan East (An Gabhlán Thoir) is also in the parish of Moyrus.
