= Scarawalsh =

Barony in County Wexford, Ireland

Scarawalsh Scairbh Bhailis (Irish)
- Barony
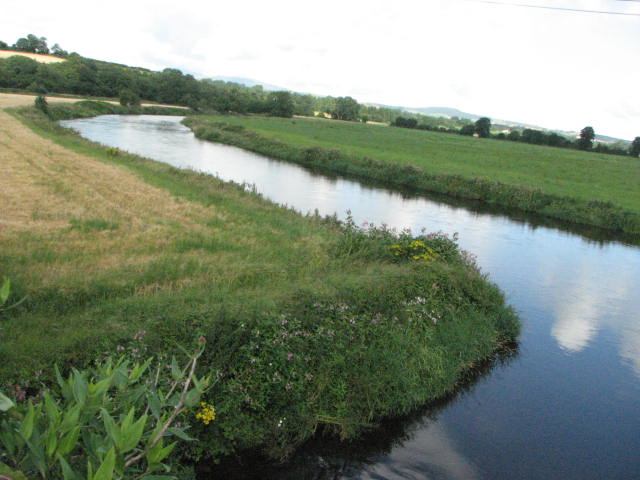
- The Slaney near Scarawalsh bridge

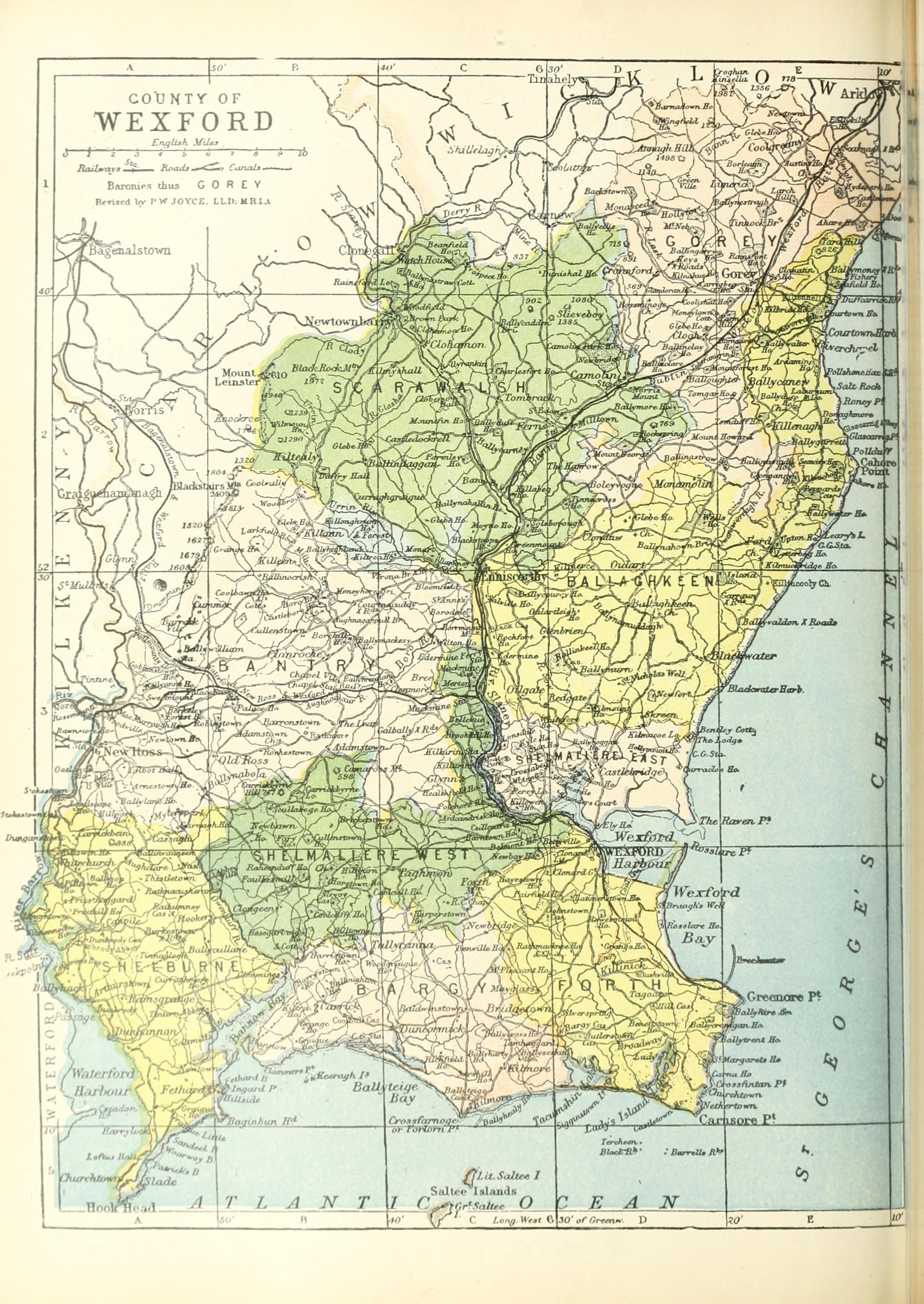
- Barony map of County Wexford, 1900; Scarawalsh barony is in the north, coloured green.

- Location within Ireland
- Coordinates: 52°33′N 6°33′W
- Sovereign state: Ireland
- Province: Leinster
- County: Wexford

Area
  - Total: 431.6 km^{2} (166.6 sq mi)

Scarawalsh (Irish: Scairbh Bhailis) is a historical barony in northern County Wexford, Ireland.

Baronies were mainly cadastral rather than administrative units. They acquired modest local taxation and spending functions in the 19th century before being superseded by the Local Government (Ireland) Act 1898.

== History ==
The barony of Scarawalsh takes its name from a townland of the same name; the name is Irish for "Walsh's shallow ford with stony bottom," referring to a crossing-point on the River Slaney on the Ferns–Enniscorthy road.

Scarawalsh contains the capital of the Uí Ceinnselaig (Kinsellas) at Ferns. In the early medieval period the Síl Chormaic were the dominant section (sept) of the Kinsellas, but in the mid-11th century, control was taken by the related Síl Fáelchán (Mac Murchadha) branch.

In the 1798 rebellion, a Scarawalsh infantry unit fought on the British side, led by a Captain Cornock; they supplied 1 captain, 2 lieutenants, 3 sergeants, a drummer, and 60 men.

== Geography ==
Scarawalsh is a large barony in the north of the county, bordering County Carlow and County Wicklow; much of it is mountainous, especially in its north. The River Bann flows through the eastern part of the barony, meeting the River Slaney downriver of Scarawalsh Bridge (near the ancient ford).

== List of settlements ==
Settlements in whole or in part the historical barony of Scarawalsh include:

- Ballindaggin
- Ballycanew
- Ballycarney
- Ballyfad
- Boolavogue
- Bunclody
- Camolin
- Castletown
- Clohamon
- Coolgreany
- Craanford
- Enniscorthy
- Ferns
- Gorey
- The Harrow
- Hollyfort
- Inch
- Killinierin
- Kilmyshall
- Kiltealy
- Monaseed
