= Gorey (barony) =

Barony in County Wexford, Ireland

Gorey Guaire (Irish)
- Barony
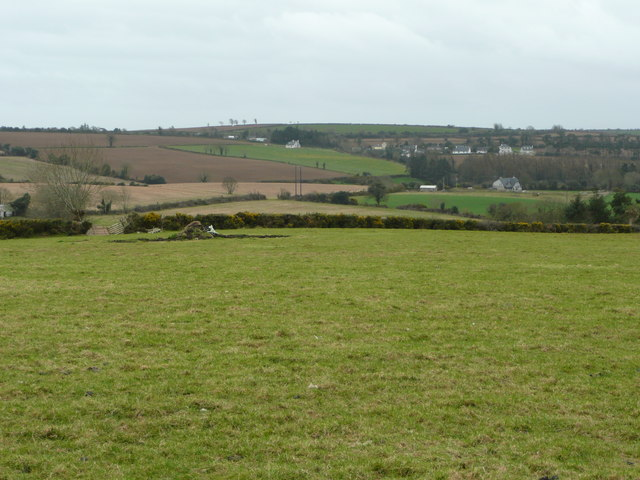
- Countryside near Gorey town

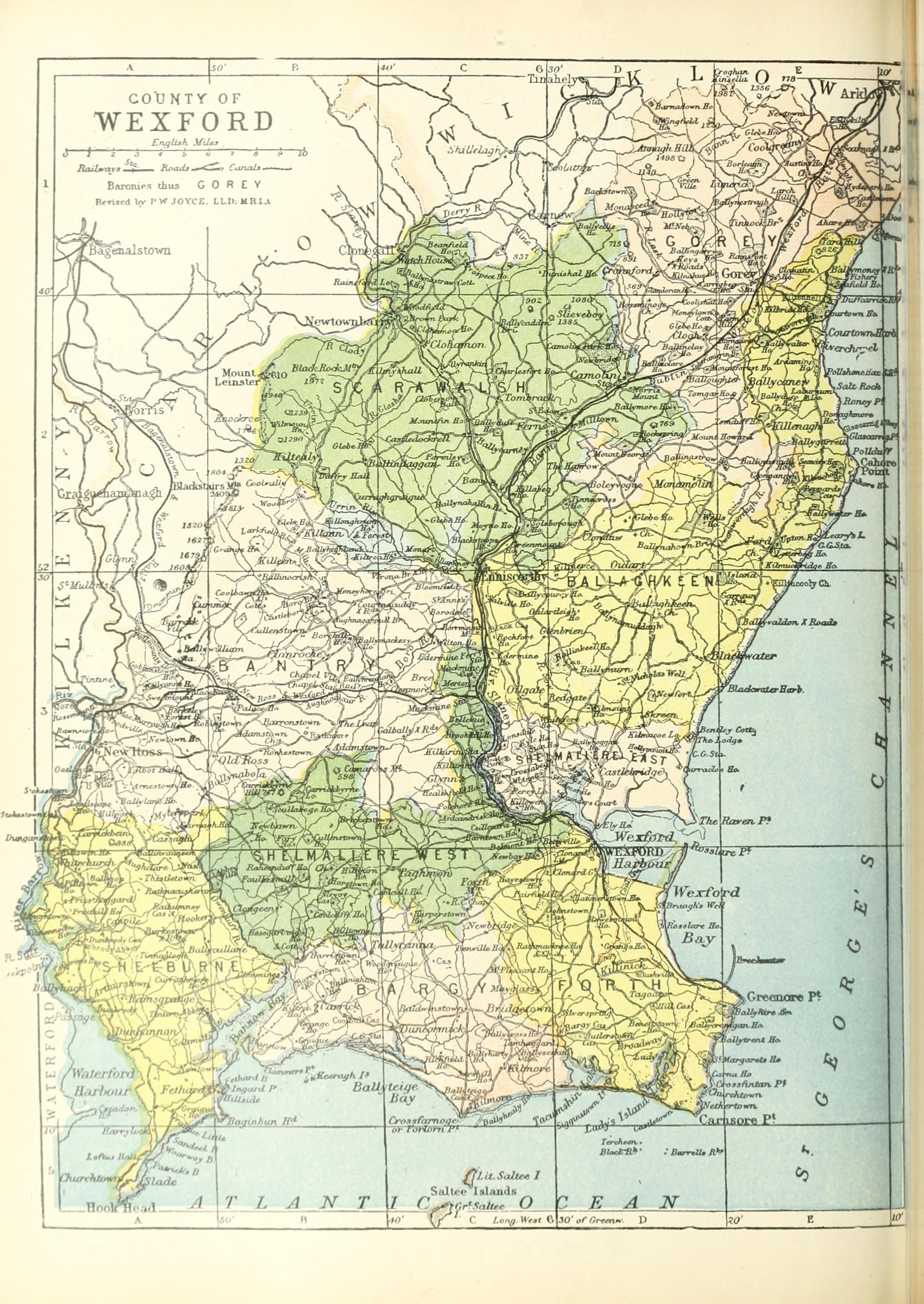
- Barony map of County Wexford, 1900; Gorey barony is in the northeast, coloured pink.

- Location within Ireland
- Coordinates: 52°41′46″N 6°18′50″W
- Sovereign state: Ireland
- Province: Leinster
- County: Wexford

Area
  - Total: 331.5 km^{2} (128.0 sq mi)

Gorey (Irish: Guaire) is a historical barony in northeastern County Wexford, Ireland.

Baronies were mainly cadastral rather than administrative units. They acquired modest local taxation and spending functions in the 19th century before being superseded by the Local Government (Ireland) Act 1898.

== History ==
The town and barony of Gorey (Irish Guaire) is believed to derive from the earlier Irish language form Gabraige, meaning "goat tribe," possibly a totemic name of the local people. There was also a group of Gabraige near the River Suck, who were described as being of the Fir Bolg.

In the Gaelic Ireland period, part of the Gorey barony was Uí Dega territory, as well as the Cenél Flaitheamhain. The northern part of the barony was ruled by the Uí Enechglaiss, whose territory continued into County Wicklow. The Uí Ceinnselaig (Kinsellas) were also based here.

== Geography ==
Gorey is in the northeast of the county, containing the source and upper parts of the River Bann and a small coastal strip, bordered by County Wicklow to the north.

== List of settlements ==
Settlements within the historical barony of Gorey include:

- Ballycanew
- Boolavogue
- Castletown
- Coolgreany
- Craanford
- Ferns
- Gorey
- The Harrow
- Hollyfort
- Inch
- Killinierin
- Monaseed
