= Coolafancy =

Village in County Wicklow, Ireland

Coolafancy Cúl na Fuinse
- Village
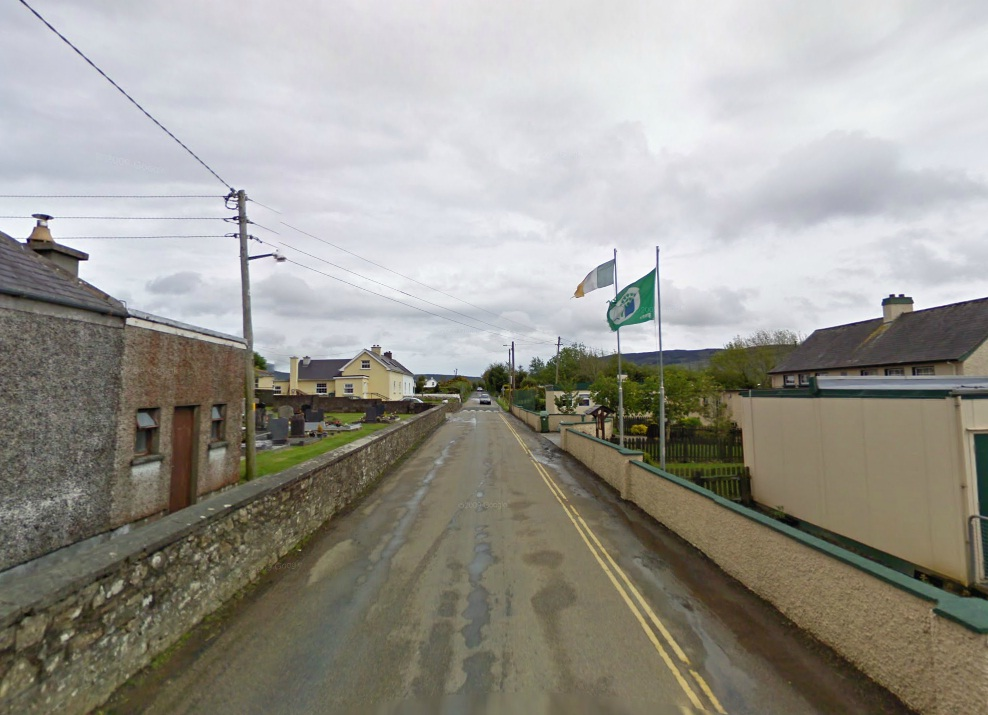
- Main Street

- Location in Ireland
- Coordinates: 52.764°N 6.432°W
- Country: Ireland
- Province: Leinster
- County: County Wicklow

Area
  - Total: 3.66 km^{2} (1.41 sq mi)
- Elevation: 136 m (446 ft)
- Irish Grid Reference: T054691

Coolafancy (Irish: Cúl na Fuinse, meaning 'recess of the ash-tree') is a townland and village in County Wicklow, Ireland. The area of Coolafancy is often referred to as Crosspatrick on maps. It is located roughly between Tinahely and Carnew, close to the neighbouring village of Coolboy. Coolafancy contains the only primary national school in the area, St. Mary's National School. The school serves the village itself and also the village of Coolboy and surrounding areas like Hillbrook, Coolroe, Cummer and Cummerduff. The name Coolafancy is sometimes written as Coolnafancy or simply Coolfancy. Coolafancy is in the civil parish of Crosspatrick.

== Location and access ==
It is located near the R748 road, which links the town of Aughrim with Carnew (via the R747). The village is situated near the southern point of the Wicklow Way which winds through the Wicklow Mountains. Annagh Hill, Croghan Mountain, and Kilcavan Gap are located nearby.

== History ==
The history of Coolafancy, as with so many other areas nearby, was dominated by the FitzWilliam family in the 19th century. The family lived in nearby Coolattin House. The Coolattin estate once comprised 88,000 acres (360 km2), had 20,000 tenants and occupied almost a quarter of County Wicklow.

The village currently only has a Roman Catholic church, but once had a Church of Ireland church named Crosspatrick Church which stood until 1973.

== See also ==
- List of towns and villages in Ireland
