= Annagh Hill =

Hill in Ireland

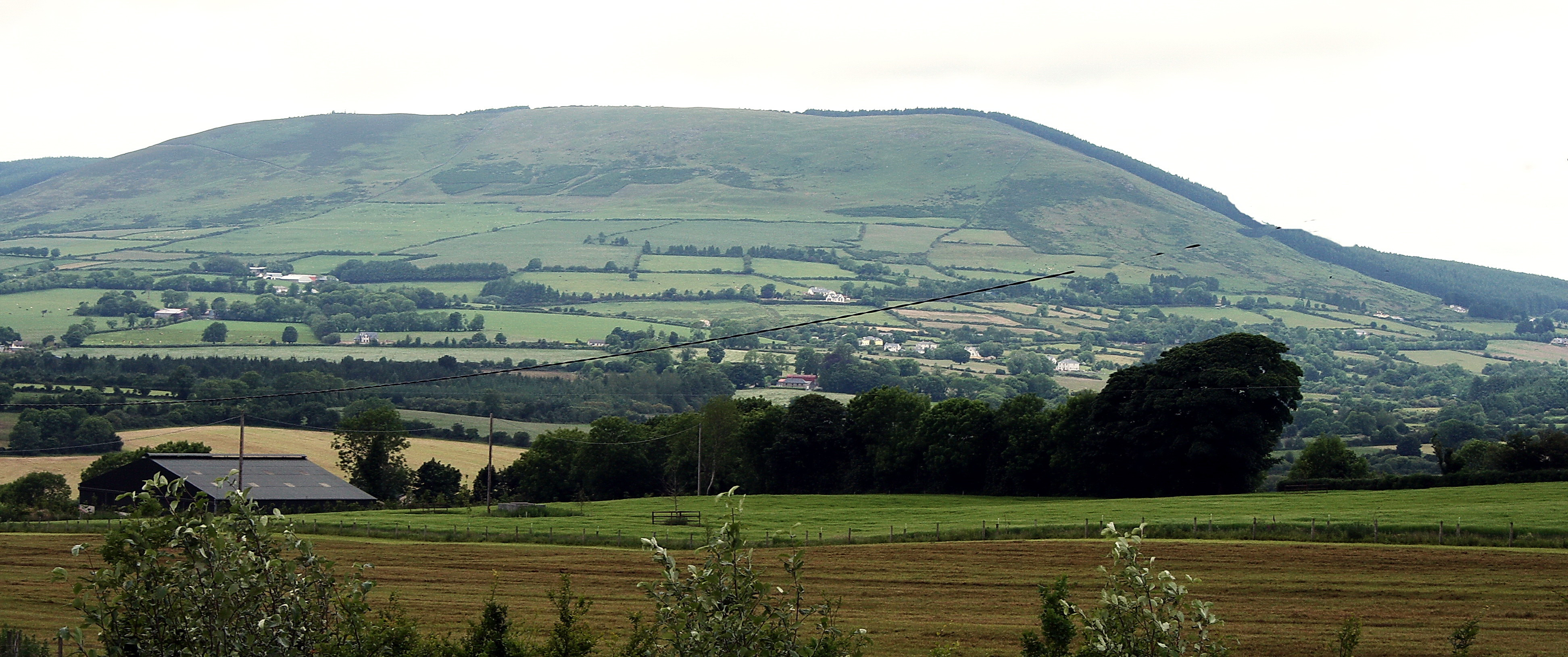
- From the southeast

Highest point
- Elevation: 454 m (1,490 ft)
- Prominence: 231 m (758 ft)
- Listing: Marilyn
- Coordinates: 52°45′N 6°22′W

Naming
- Native name: Cnoc na hEanaí

Geography
- Location within island of Ireland
- Location: County Wexford, Ireland
- Parent range: Wicklow Mountains
- OSI/OSNI grid: T100680
- Topo map: OSi Discovery 62

Annagh Hill (Irish: Cnoc na hEanaí) is a hill in the north of County Wexford, Ireland.

== Geography ==
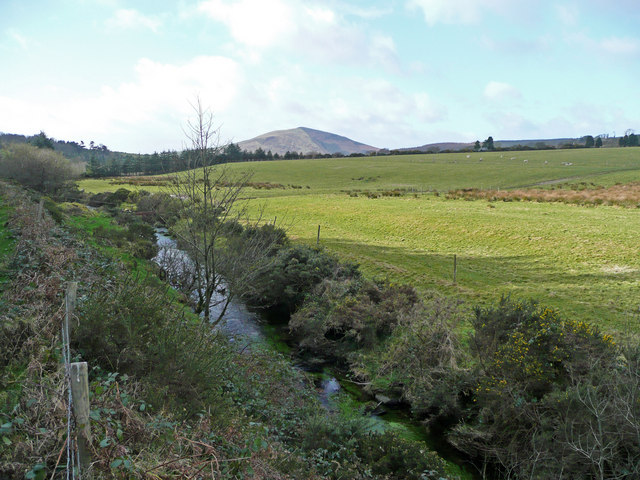
Bann River and Annagh Hill

Annagh Hill is separated from Croghan Mountain to the north by the "Wicklow Gap", not to be confused with the Wicklow Gap in County Wicklow. Except for the southeastern face (see photo) it is covered in coniferous forest.

It overlooks the villages of Monaseed and Hollyfort to the south, across the valley of the Blackwater stream.

== See also ==
- River Bann (Wexford)
