= Coolboy =

Village in County Wicklow, Ireland

Coolboy An Cúl Buí
- Village
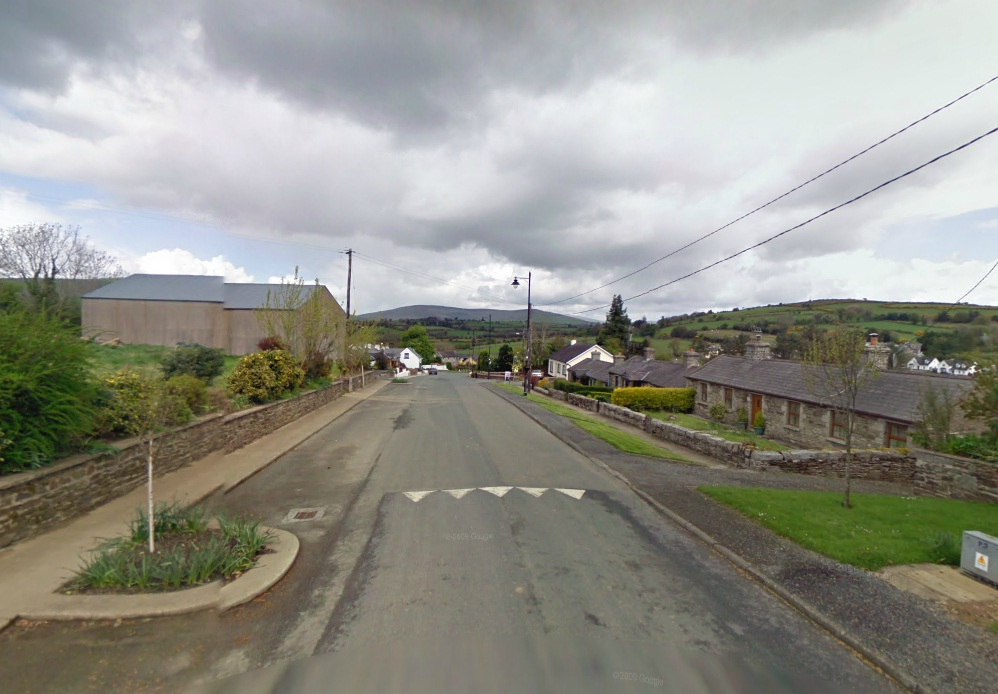
- Entering village from the west

- Location in Ireland
- Coordinates: 52.761°N 6.464°W
- Country: Ireland
- Province: Leinster
- County: County Wicklow
- Elevation: 95 m (312 ft)

Population (2016)
  - Total: 267
- Irish Grid Reference: T036691

Coolboy (Irish: An Cúl Buí) is a village in County Wicklow in Ireland. It is located between Tinahely and Carnew, in the middle of Holts Way, close to the Kilcavan Gap.

== Location and access ==
It is located on the R748 road which links the town of Aughrim with Carnew (via the R747). The village is situated near the southern point of the Wicklow Way which winds through the Wicklow Mountains.

== History ==
Most of the village dates from the early part of the 19th century. In this time the area was dominated by the Fitzwilliam family who lived in nearby Coollattin House. The Coollattin estate once comprised 88,000 acres (360 km^{2}), had 20,000 tenants and occupied almost a quarter of County Wicklow.

== Recreation ==
The village has a Gaelic handball alley, home of the Coolboy Handball Team. Coolattin Golf Club is 3 km from Coolboy and is an 18-hole, par 70 course.

Tomnafinnoge Woods, also located nearby, has a number of woodland walking trails. One of these walking routes travels along the line of a former railway, leading to the nearby town of Tinahely.

An annual agricultural show takes place in Tinahely, near Coolboy, on the first Monday of August (a bank holiday in the Republic of Ireland). The one-day show is held at Fairwood Park and has been running since 1935.

== See also ==
- List of towns and villages in Ireland
