= Ballyoughter, County Wexford =

Village in County Wexford, Ireland

Coordinates: 52.6151°N 6.3733°W

Ballyoughter is a small village in County Wexford, Ireland, around 8 kilometres (5 mi) south west of Gorey.

It comprises the Church of the Sacred heart, (completed 1876) and Ballyoughter National School.
