= Coolboy (disambiguation) =

Coolboy is a village in County Wicklow, Ireland.

Coolboy may also refer to:

- Coolboy Ngamole, South African marathon runner
- Coolboy, a townland in County Tipperary, Ireland – see List of townlands of County Tipperary
- Coolboys and the Frontman, Australian rock band
