= Kilcavan =

Kilcavan may refer:

- Kilcavan, County Wicklow, a townland in Ireland
- Kilcavan GAA, a Gaelic football club in County Laois, Ireland
- Various townlands in County Wexford, Ireland; see List of townlands of County Wexford
- A townland in County Laois; see List of townlands of County Laois
- A parish in County Wexford; see List of civil parishes of Ireland § Wexford
