= Hollyfort =

Village in County Wexford, Ireland

Coordinates: 52°43′N 6°21′W

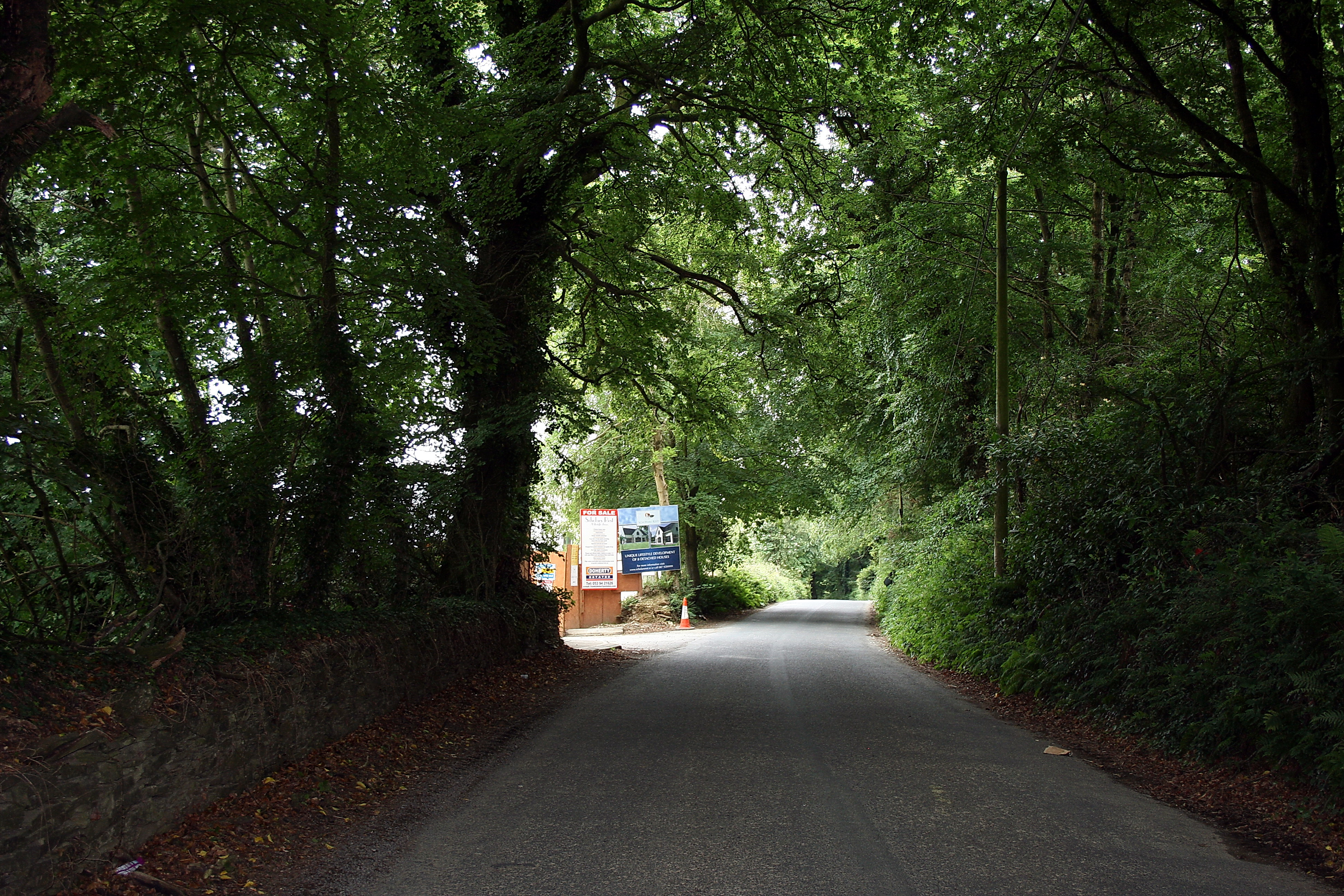
Hollyfort village - opening on the left

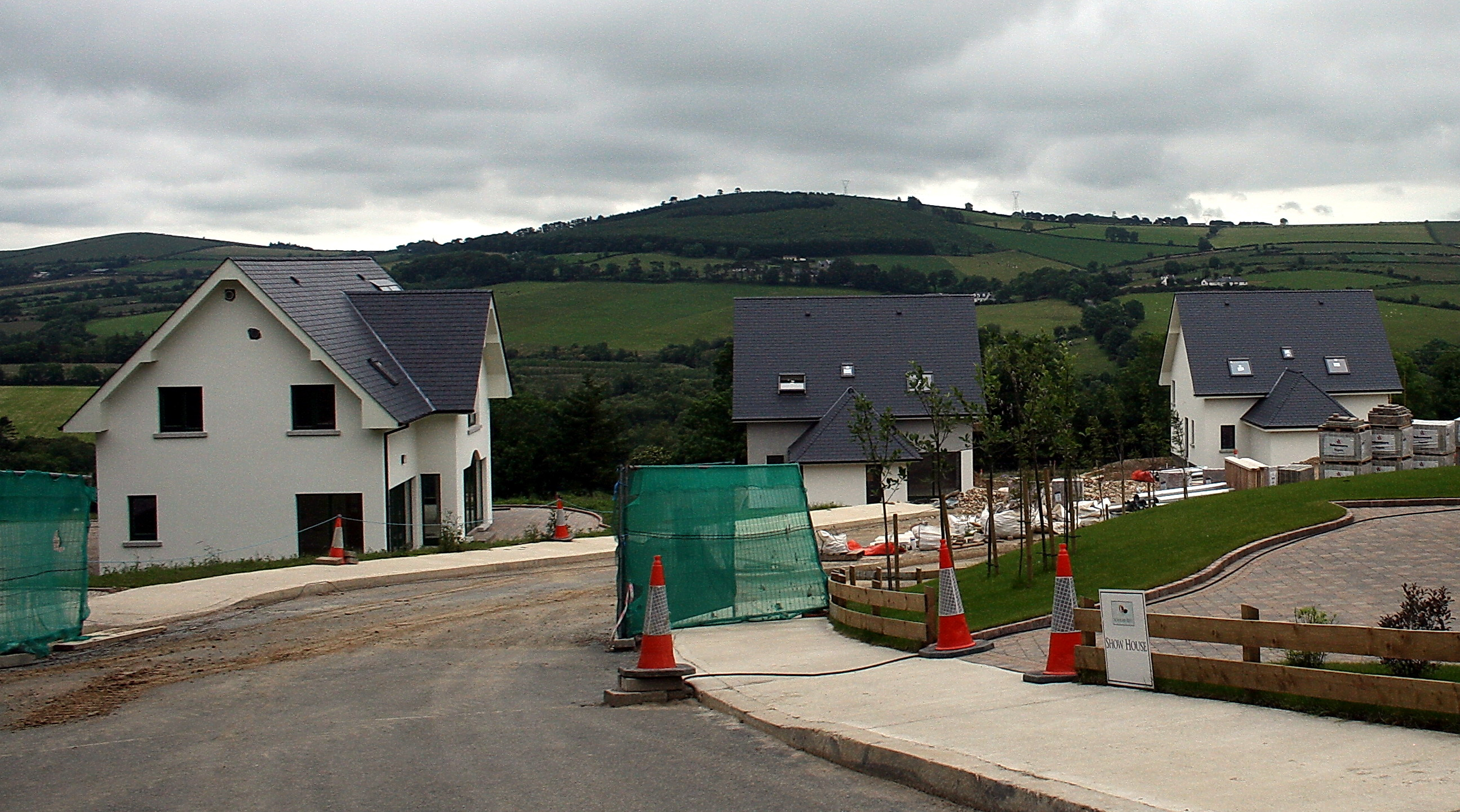
Through the opening - new suburban housing

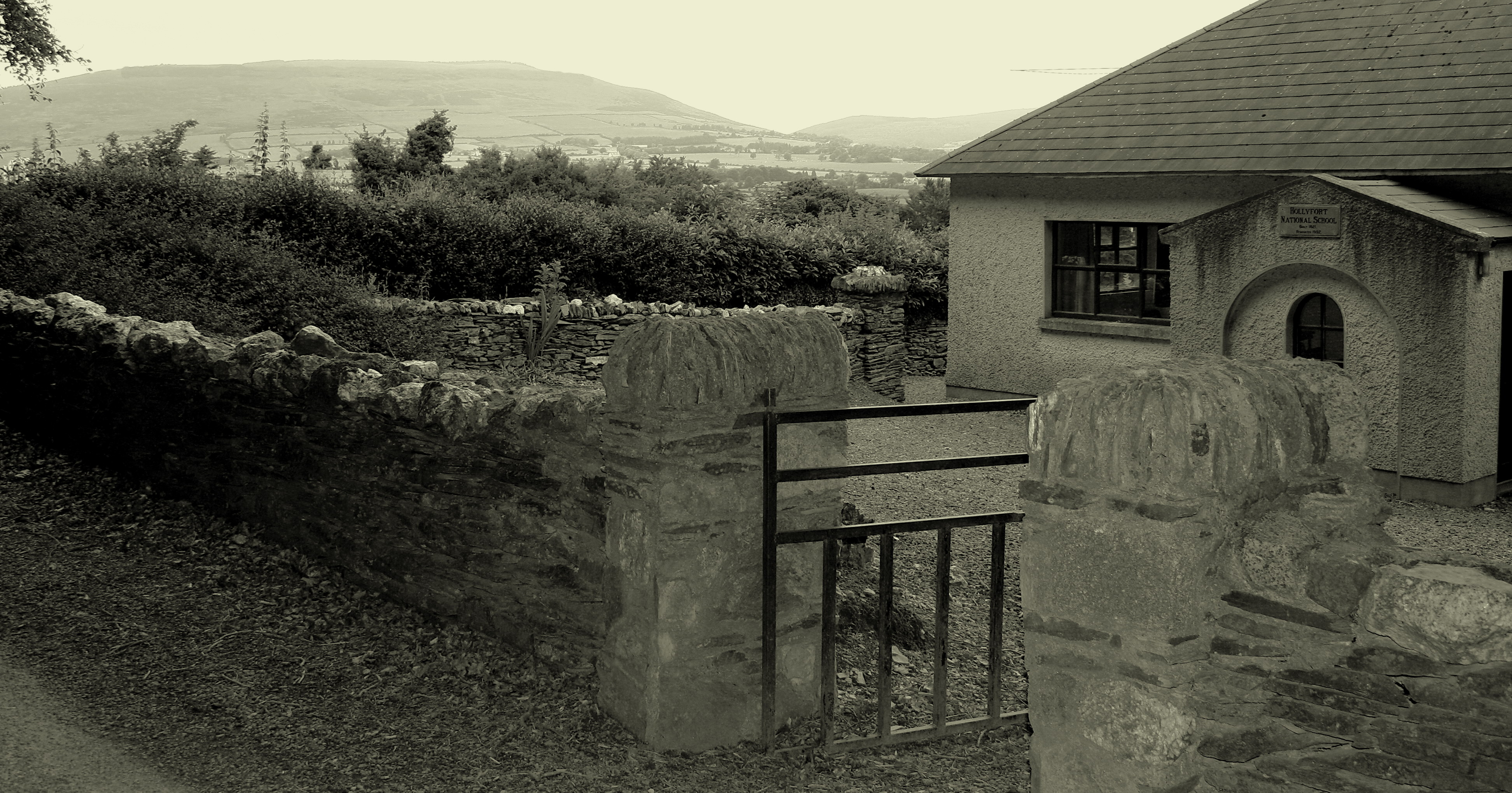
National School with Annagh Hill in background

Hollyfort (Irish: Ráth an Chuilinn, meaning 'ringfort of the holly') is a village north of County Wexford, Ireland. It lies within the townland of Mongan (Irish: an Mongán, meaning 'the little swamp') in the valley of the River Bann, 5 km northwest of Gorey.

Like its neighbour Monaseed 4 km to the west, Hollyfort is currently experiencing the addition of housing, in the form of small housing estates. Unlike Monaseed, the Hollyfort developments are generally within the village area. Hollyfort has a pub, Cooney's, as well as a few abandoned buildings, such as the old bakery and petrol station.

== See also ==
- List of towns and villages in Ireland
