= R746 road (Ireland) =

Road in Ireland

R746 road
- Bóthar R746
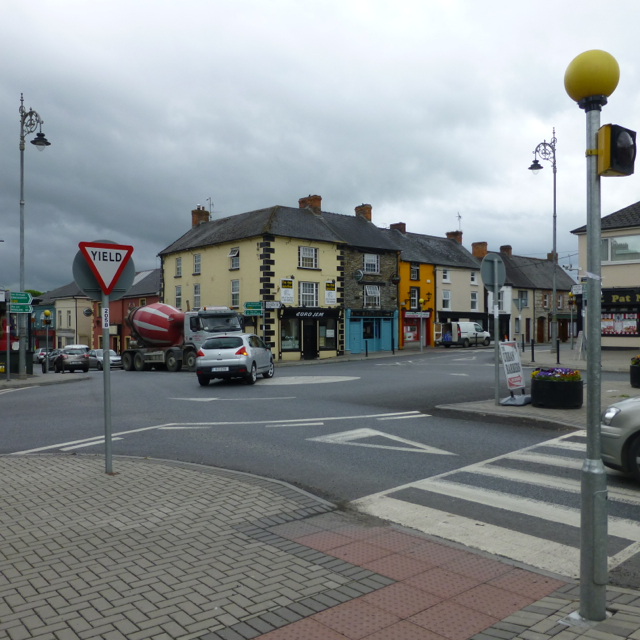
- Junction of R746 and N80 in Bunclody

Route information
- Length: 22.2 km (13.8 mi)

Major junctions
- From: R702 at Doran's Cross, County Wexford
- N80 at Bunclody; Enter County Wicklow
- To: R725 at Croneyhorn, County Wicklow

Location
- Country: Ireland

Highway system
- Roads in Ireland; Motorways; Primary; Secondary; Regional
← R745	→ R747

The R746 road is a regional road in Ireland. It connects the R702 road at Doran's Cross, County Wexford with the R725 road at Croneyhorn, County Wicklow, via Bunclody. The R746 is 22.2 kilometres (13.8 mi) long.
