= Gorey Guardian =

Newspaper in County Wexford, Ireland

- Type: Weekly newspaper
- Format: Tabloid
- Owner(s): Mediahuis Ireland, a subsidiary of Mediahuis
- Language: English
- Headquarters: Market Square, Gorey, County Wexford
- Price: €2
- Website: http://www.goreyguardian.ie/

The Gorey Guardian is a local newspaper published once per week (every Wednesday) in County Wexford, Ireland. It is published in colour.

The newspaper contains stories relating primarily to Gorey town and its surrounding area, as well as stories relating to County Wexford.

Founded c. 1904, it is owned by the Mediahuis Ireland (formerly Independent News & Media) group.
