= R725 road (Ireland) =

Road in Ireland

R725 road
- Bóthar R725
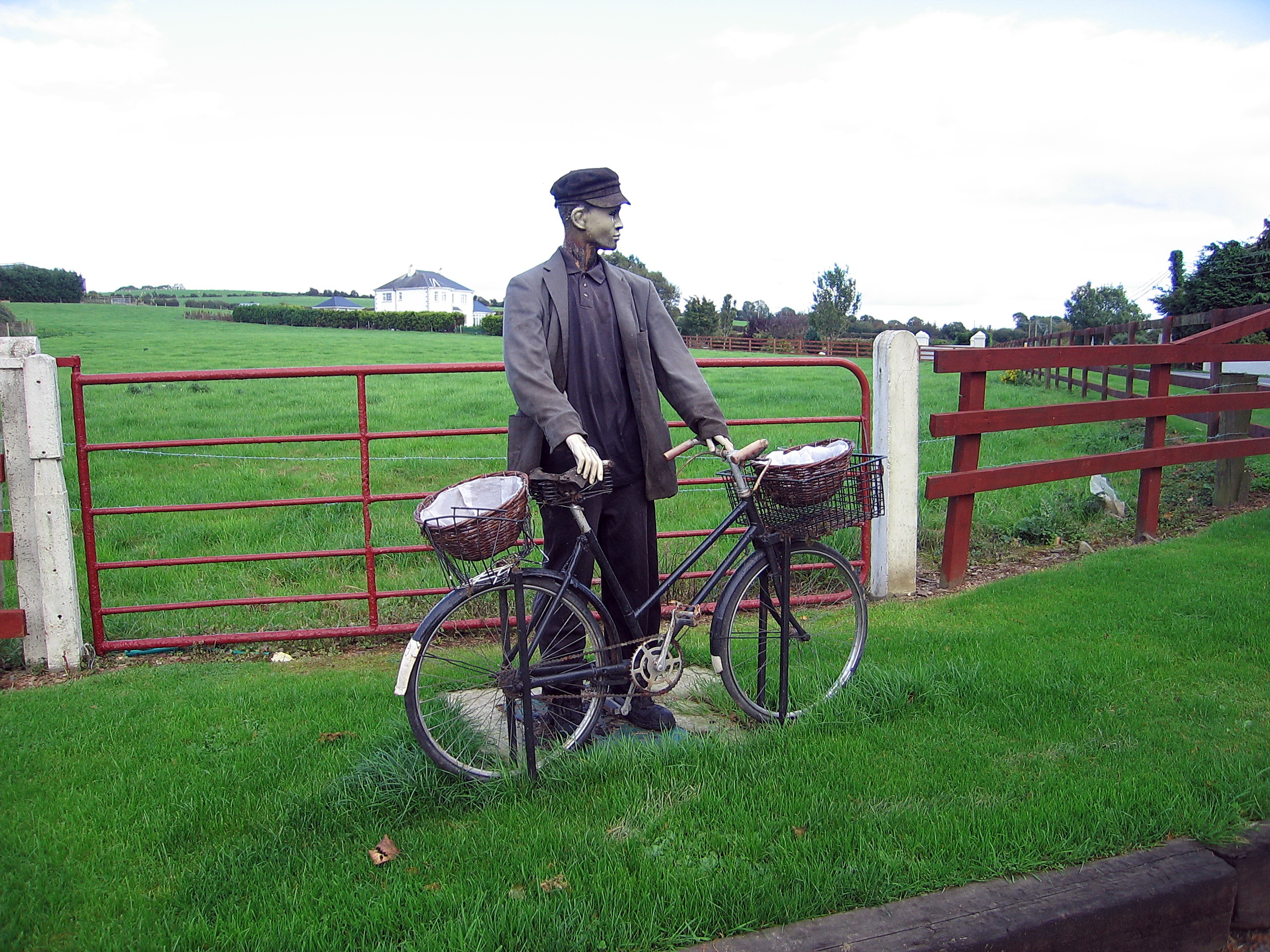
- Watching the R725 at Craanford

Route information
- Length: 53 km (33 mi)

Location
- Country: Ireland
- Primary destinations: County Carlow; Carlow – leaves the N80; Grangeford; Tullow – (R418), join N81 to cross the River Slaney, leave N81; Cross the Derreen River; County Wicklow; Cross the Wicklow Way; Shillelagh – (R749), cross the Derry Water; (R746); Carnew – (R748); County Wexford; Craanford; Gorey, terminates at the R772

Highway system
- Roads in Ireland; Motorways; Primary; Secondary; Regional

The R725 road is a regional road in Ireland. From its junction with the N80 on the western outskirts of Carlow Town it takes an easterly route to its junction with the N81 in Tullow, where it crosses the River Slaney on a bridge shared with the N81 in the town centre. It continues east to Shillelagh in County Wicklow, turns due south for 6 km, then eastwards through Carnew. It then enters County Wexford for the final 15 km stretch, terminating in Gorey at the R772. The road is 53 km (33 mi) long.

== See also ==
- Roads in Ireland
- National primary road
- National secondary road
