= R748 road (Ireland) =

Regional road in Ireland

R748 road
- Bóthar R748
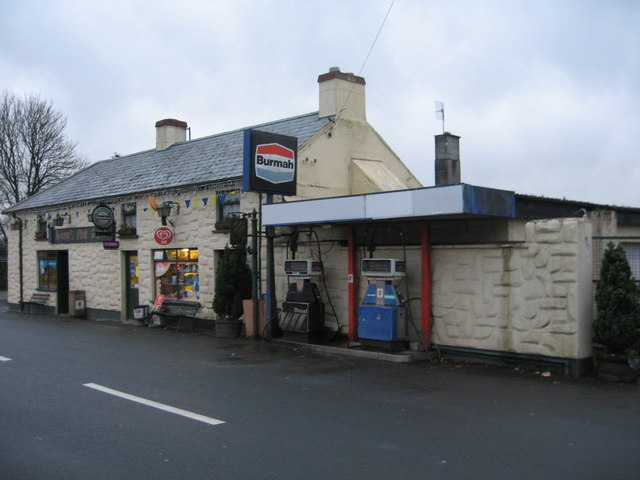
- Petrol station on the R748 in Carnew

Route information
- Length: 11.0 km (6.8 mi)

Major junctions
- From: R725 at Main Street, Carnew, County Wicklow

- To: R747 at Killaveny

Location
- Country: Ireland

Highway system
- Roads in Ireland; Motorways; Primary; Secondary; Regional
← R747	→ R749

The R748 road is a regional road in County Wicklow, Ireland. It travels from Carnew to the R747 road, via Kilcavan, Coolboy and Coolafancy. The road is 11.0 kilometres (6.8 mi) long.
