= River Bann (County Wexford) =

River in Wexford, Ireland

Coordinates: 52°33′N 6°33′W

River Bann Wexford Bann
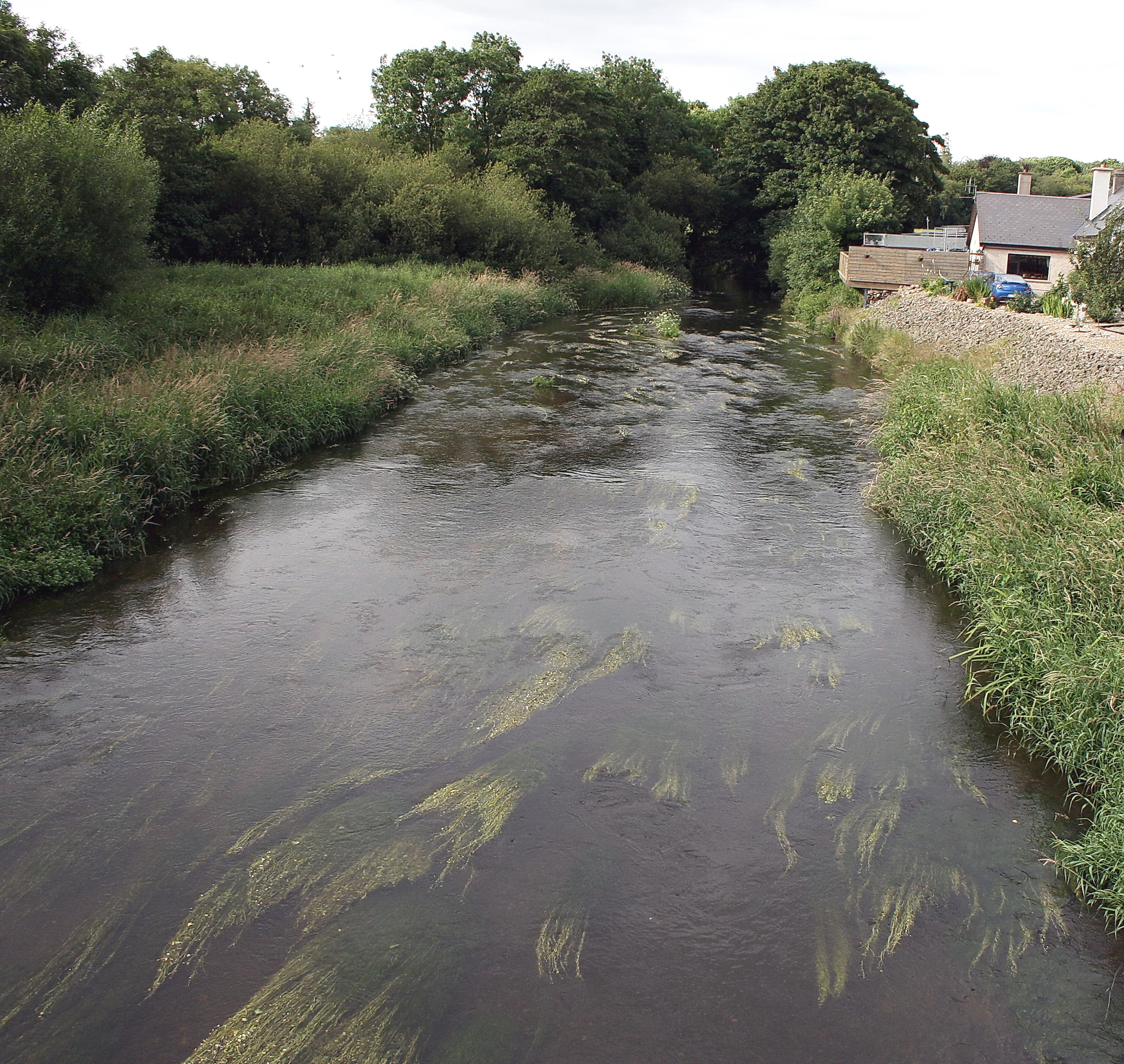
- River Bann at Milltown near Ferns

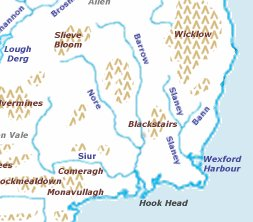
- Map of the rivers of southeast Ireland
- Etymology: Irish bán-abha, "white river"
- Native name: An Bhanna (Irish)

Location
- Country: Ireland

Physical characteristics
- Source
  - location: Croghan Mountain, County Wexford
  - coordinates: 52.5562, -6.5254
- Mouth
  - location: Irish Sea at Wexford, as the River Slaney
- Length: 42 kilometres (26 mi)
- Basin size: 161 km^{2} (62 sq mi)
- Discharge
  - average: 3.18 m^{3}/s (112 cu ft/s) (at Ferns)

The River Bann (Irish: An Bhanna) is a river in County Wexford, in the southeast of the Republic of Ireland.

== Course ==
The river rises in the southern slopes of Croghan Mountain in north Wexford on the County Wicklow border. It flows south and is joined by the Blackwater Stream near the village of Hollyfort. Veering southwest it passes under the R725, then continuing southwestwards it flows beneath the N11 national primary route at the village of Camolin.

It is crossed by the Dublin - Wexford railway four times as it flows past the town of Ferns before joining the River Slaney north of Enniscorthy.

== History ==
In the 1950s a reservoir was built at Ballythomas to supply water to the town of Gorey, County Wexford. Before that, its banks regularly spilled over and made a lot of swamp land on its route.

== Wildlife ==
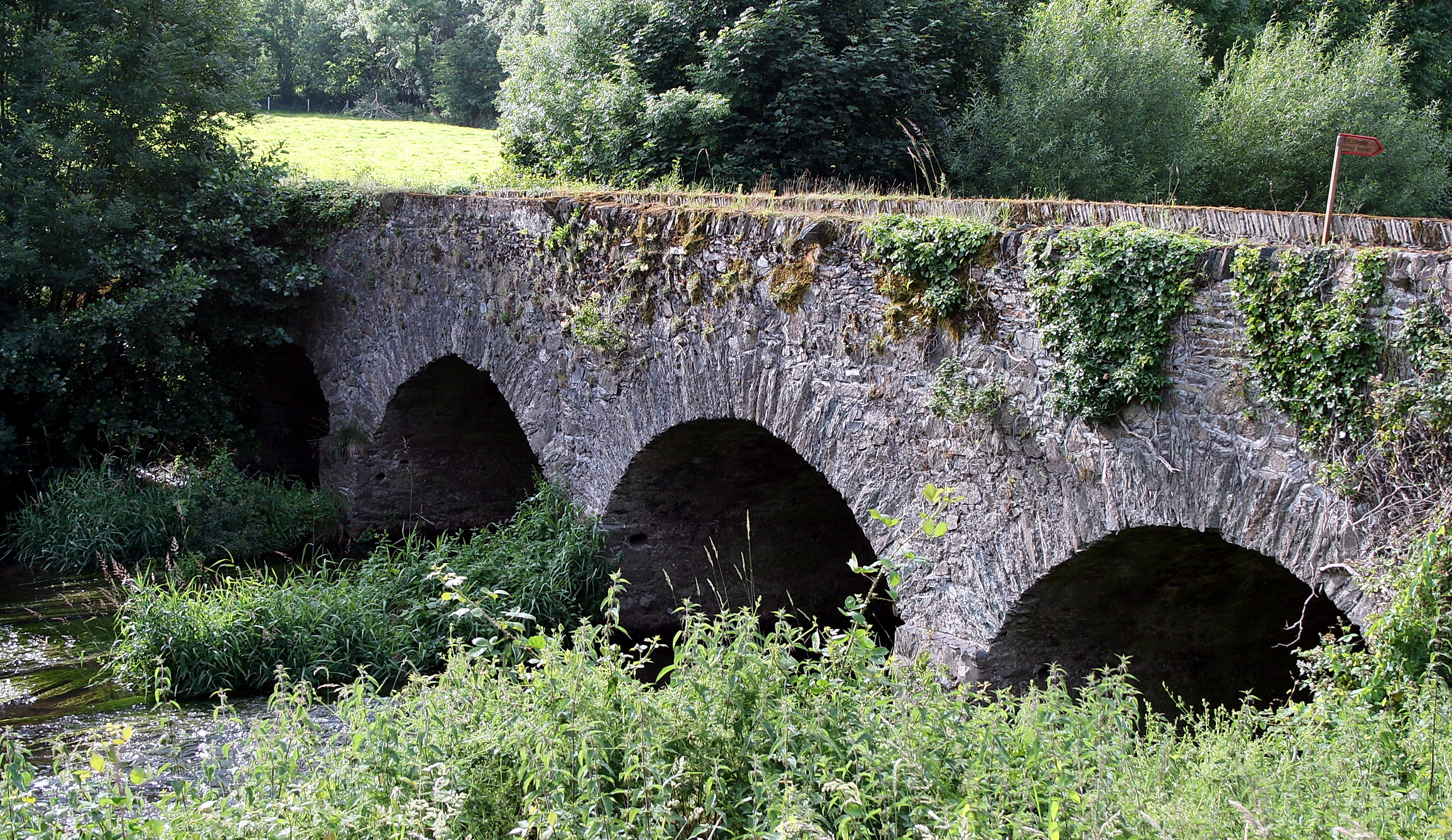
River Bann at Milltown Bridge, Ferns

Varied and plentiful wildlife can be found in the environs of the river. In Wicklow and North Wexford, herds of deer can be seen, as well as mute swans, dippers, mallards, grey herons and kingfishers. At dusk, bats, owls and otters may be seen, while the mudflats of the Slaney estuary are favoured by black-headed gulls, redshanks and oystercatchers. In season, salmon and trout and occasional pike are fished. It is primarily a sea trout fishery, with the best fishing from mid-April to October. The upper reaches are known for good brown trout fishing from March to October.

== See also ==
- Rivers of Ireland
