= Bunclody =

Town in County Wexford, Ireland

Bunclody Bun Clóidí
- Town
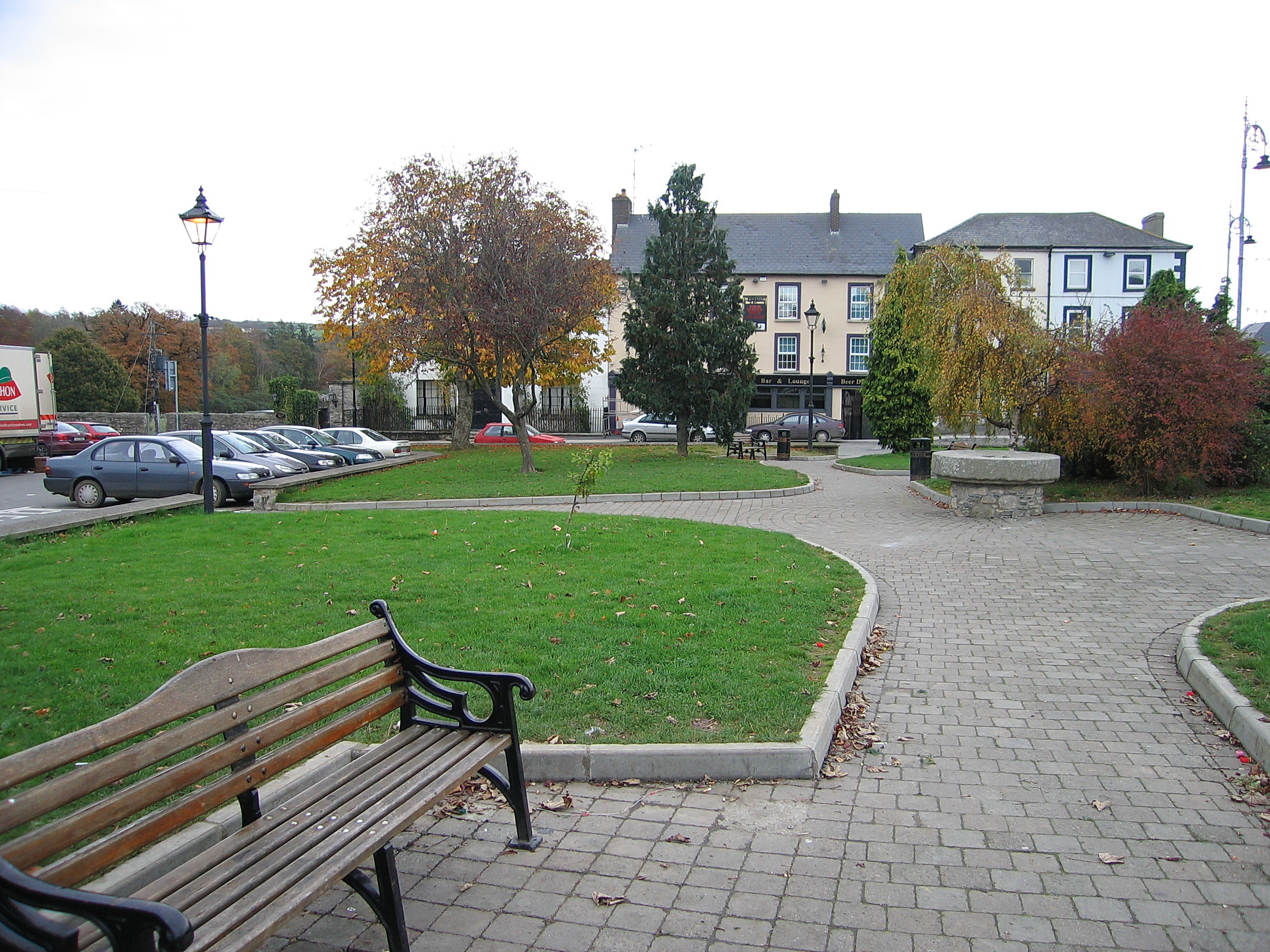
- Bunclody's market square

- Location in Ireland
- Coordinates: 52.655°N 6.651°W
- Country: Ireland
- Province: Leinster
- County: Wexford
- Elevation: 52 m (171 ft)

Population (2022)
  - Total: 2,053
- Irish Grid Reference: S909569

Bunclody (Irish: Bun Clóidí, meaning 'bottom of the (river) Clody'), formerly Newtownbarry (until 1950), is a small town on the River Slaney in Wexford, Ireland. It is located near the foot of Mount Leinster. Most of the town is in County Wexford; a small area at the north end of town is in County Carlow. Bunclody has received a number of high scores in the Tidy Towns competition.

Bunclody is 20 km by road north of Enniscorthy. The R746 road intersects the N80 road in the town.

== Name ==
During the 17th century, the name of the town was changed from Bunclody to Newtownbarry, but was reverted to its original name in the 20th century, following Irish independence. The change was made official by a local government order in 1950.

== History ==
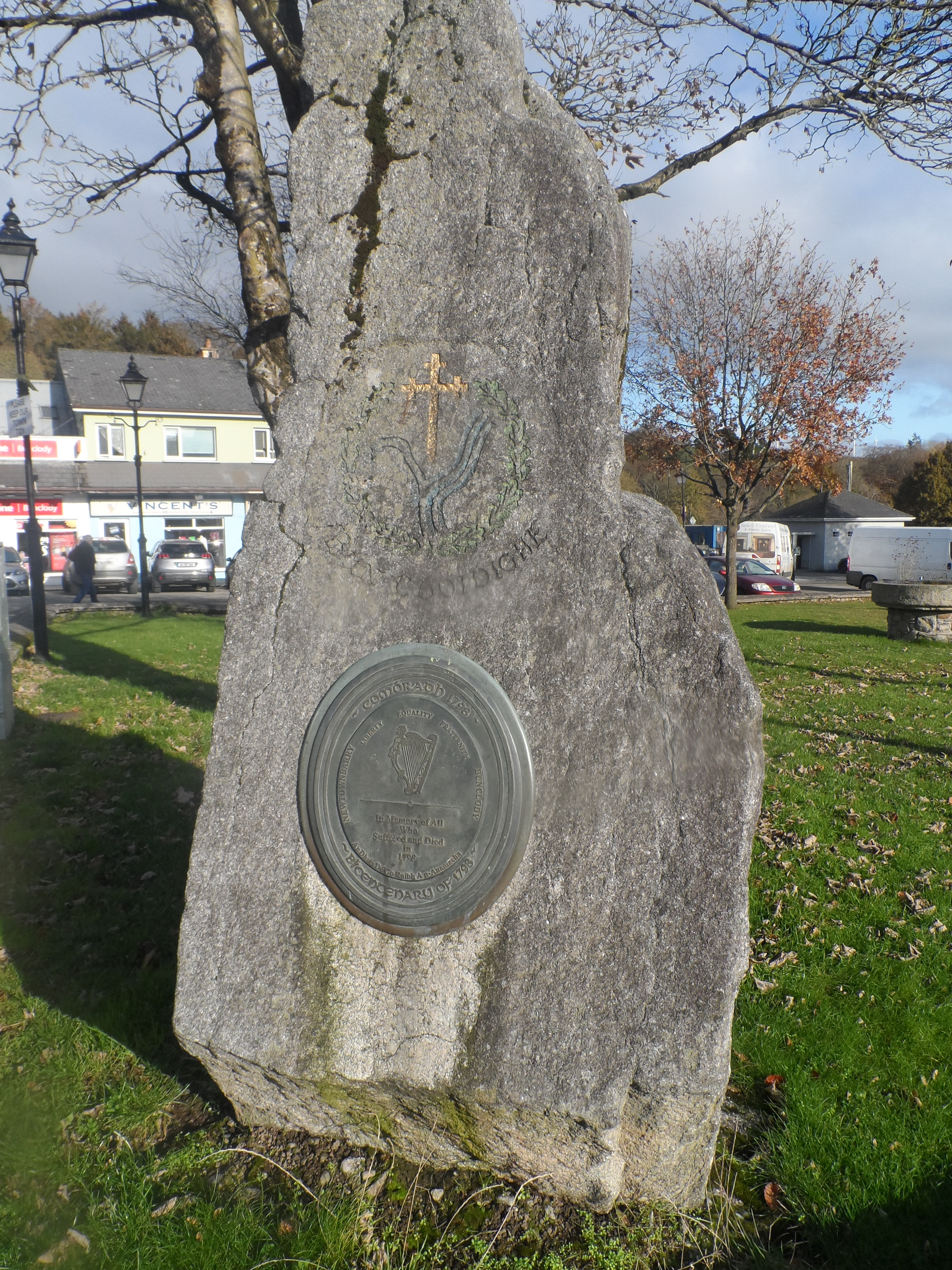
1798 Rebellion memorial stone, Bunclody

Although a hamlet already existed here, Bunclody was raised to the status of a post town in 1577 by alderman James Barry, sheriff of Dublin.

The town was the scene of the Battle of Bunclody during the 1798 rebellion.

In the 19th century, a small canal was made, drawing water from the Clody river, to provide drinking water for the town. The canal still flows along the middle of the town's main street. During the Tithe War, 1830–1836, 'Newtownbarry' was the scene of a clash between locals and the officials of the Crown. Locals had become enraged by the seizure of property by the police and army to pay for the Protestant Episcopal polity. According to James Connolly, "twelve peasants were shot and twenty fatally wounded".

In 1884, a metal bridge was built across the River Slaney upstream from today's bridge. It was built of iron from New Ross, and assembled in the bridge meadow beside where the bridge stood. This bridge was washed away in 1965 by a flood. The remains of the bridge were visible from the bank of the river for some years, until it was removed in 2007, during the building of Bunclody Golf and Fishing Club beside the River Slaney.

Notable residents included the travel writer Mabel Hall-Dare (1847–1929), who grew up in the town before her marriage, in 1877, to the explorer J. Theodore Bent (1852–1897). At nearby Ballyrankin House lived the mother and daughter writers Moira O'Neill (1864–1955) and Molly Keane (1904–1996).

=== Civil War events ===
The town was a site of three fatalities during the Irish Civil War.

The first was James Roche, a member of the Anti-Treaty IRA, who died in a car crash on 4 July 1922.

The second person killed was Lieutenant Ignatius "Nacey" Redmond, a local member of Sinn Féin, who held the post of secretary. He had overseen pro-treaty meetings in Easter 1922 in the town, in opposition to the position of his comrades, and resigned his post in Sinn Féin in August 1922 before joining the pro-treaty Free State army. On 2 October 1922, he was killed approximately two and a half miles from Bunclody on the old Bunclody-Kiltealy road.

The third was 29 year old Thomas Doyle, a World War I veteran from Enniscorthy, who later worked as a clerical officer with the Free State army. He was shot dead at Ryland's Cross outside the town when a Free State army vehicle was ambushed on 1 December 1922.

== Demography ==
Historical population
Year	Pop.	±%
1821	1,095	—
1831	1,430	+30.6%
1841	1,437	+0.5%
1851	1,307	−9.0%
1861	1,097	−16.1%
1871	1,014	−7.6%
1881	960	−5.3%
1891	909	−5.3%
1901	890	−2.1%
1911	884	−0.7%
1926	709	−19.8%
1936	684	−3.5%
1946	699	+2.2%
1951	805	+15.2%
1956	976	+21.2%
1961	891	−8.7%
1966	940	+5.5%
1971	929	−1.2%
1981	1,467	+57.9%
1986	1,423	−3.0%
1991	1,316	−7.5%
1996	1,241	−5.7%
2002	1,361	+9.7%
2006	1,863	+36.9%
2011	2,012	+8.0%
2016	1,984	−1.4%
2022	2,053	+3.5%

Bunclody–Carrickduff is a census town split between County Carlow and County Wexford. It comprises the town of Bunclody and the adjoining village of Carrigduff, and had a population of 2,053 at the 2022 census, an increase from 1,984 at the 2016 census.

Demographically, a number of nationalities are represented, with approximately 13% of its population being of Polish nationality, and approximately 8.7% Irish Traveller.

== Schools ==
The town has two primary schools: Bunclody National School and Carrigduff National School. There are two secondary schools. The FCJ Secondary School and Bunclody Vocational College. The FCJ (Faithful Companions of Jesus) school was founded by a French order of nuns in 1861, and was a boarding school for girls throughout the 20th century. The all-girls school provided education for day pupils and accepted male day pupils from the late 1960s when the school became co-educational. The old boarding school was demolished in 2002.

== Tourism and culture ==
Bunclody featured in the 2018 Venice Architectural Biennale, alongside nine other Irish market towns. A volunteer-led tourist office is open in the town.

The Bunclody Adventure Hub at Ryland Road allows access to water sports on the River Slaney. There are also a number of walking trails along the Clody Valley and off-road trails at Coolmeelagh and Kilbranish. It is a point on the Columban Way, which runs from Bangor, County Down through Bunclody and on through mainland Europe to Bobbio in Italy – following the life journey of Saint Columbanus.

A folk song about Bunclody, titled Streams of Bunclody and written by a local emigrant, was reputedly one of Luke Kelly's favourite ballads. A festival, the "Streams of Bunclody Festival", is held annually in July.

== Transport ==
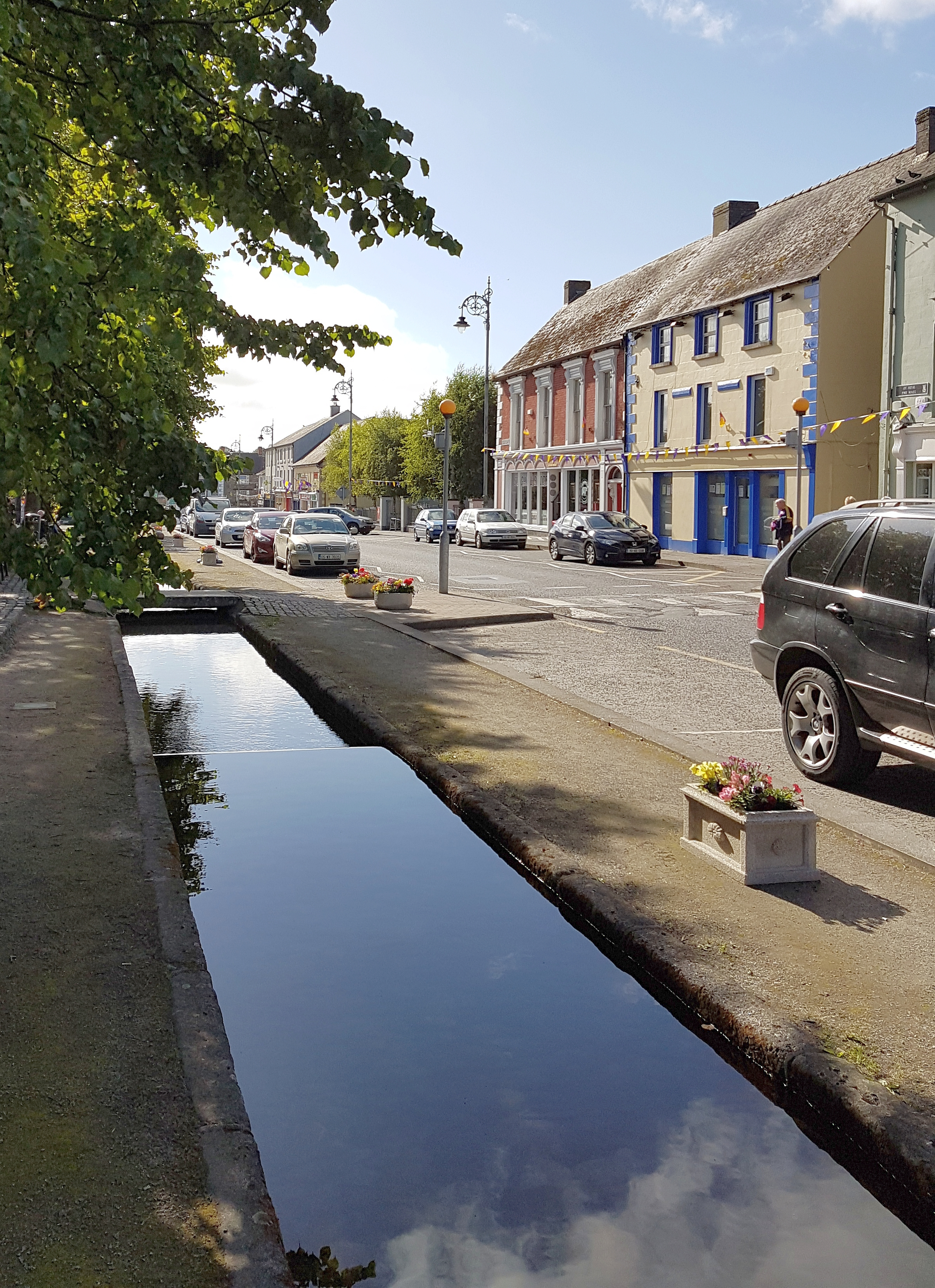
Main Street in Bunclody

The town is approximately 25 km from the M9 motorway and 20 km from the M11. Bunclody is served by Local Link bus routes 368 (Bunclody to Enniscorthy) and 369 (New Ross to Tullow via Bunclody). Bus Éireann operates route 132 from the town to Dublin. Wexford Bus also provides a scheduled service from Wexford to Carlow via Bunclody on route 376. While Bunclody was never served by rail, early 19th century proposals called for two railway lines to serve the area; these plans never progressed. The nearest station is Enniscorthy railway station approximately 23 kilometres away.

== Sport ==
Bunclody Golf and Fishing Club was officially opened in early 2009. The course is on the Carlow side of the town. The 18-hole course is set on 300 acres (1.2 km^{2}) beside the river Slaney, and is home to Ireland's first on-course elevator, which links the 17th green to the 18th tee. The great spotted woodpecker, Ireland's newest breeding bird, was spotted there in 2013. Bunclody Golf and Fishing Club hosted the Irish PGA in August 2019.

The local Gaelic Athletic Association club, Halfway House Bunclody (sometimes abbreviated to HWH-Bunclody), won the Wexford Intermediate Hurling Championship in 2010. The club also fields Gaelic football teams, in the Enniscorthy District, and won the Wexford Senior Football Championship in 1985.

A local association football club, Bunclody AFC, was founded in 1969 and fields teams in the Wexford Football League Premier Division.
