= Craanford =

Village in County Wexford, Ireland

Craanford Áth an Chorráin
- Village
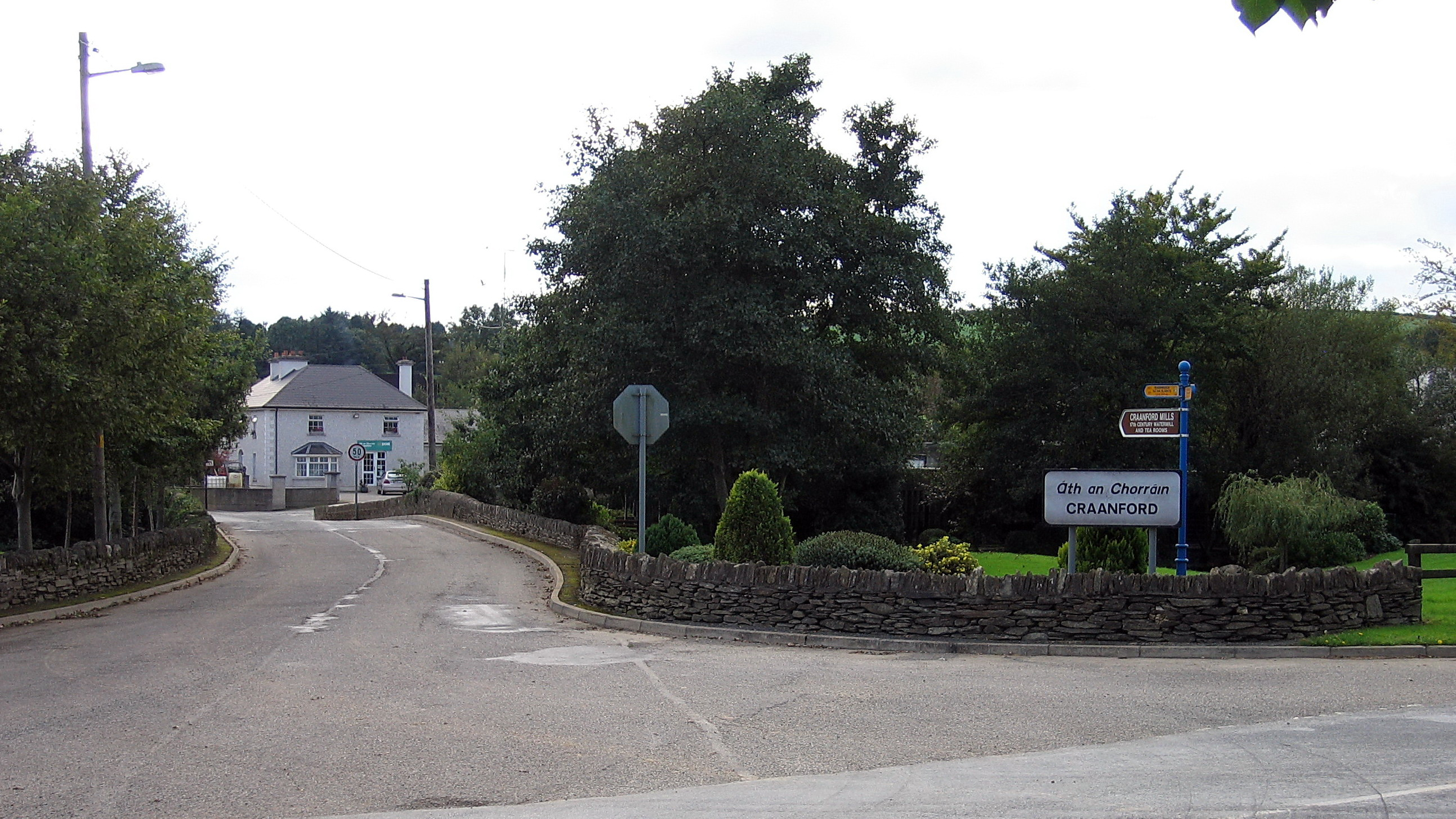
- Craanford village

- Location in Ireland
- Coordinates: 52°41′00″N 6°23′00″W
- Country: Ireland
- Province: Leinster
- County: County Wexford
- Elevation: 48 m (157 ft)
- Time zone: UTC+0 (WET)
  - Summer (DST): UTC-1 (IST (WEST))
- Irish Grid Reference: T085604

Craanford (Irish: Áth an Chorráin) is a small village in north County Wexford, Ireland, situated on the R725 regional road midway between Gorey and Carnew.

It is closely associated with the Irish Rebellion of 1798. The village features an early 17th-century corn mill which has been restored and a small church. Craanford also has an aqua park at the bottom of the village. The River Lask also flows through Craanford.

== Education ==
St. Patricks National School is the local primary school.

== Sport ==
The village also has a GAA club and Camogie Club which now has a walking track around the local G.A.A. pitch. They have an indoor complex and two new dressing rooms and an underpass from the school.

== See also ==
- List of towns and villages in Ireland
