= Tomnafinnoge Woods =

Woodland in County Wicklow, Ireland

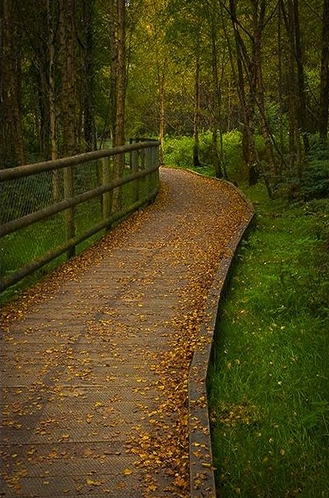
Walkway in Tomnafinogue Woods

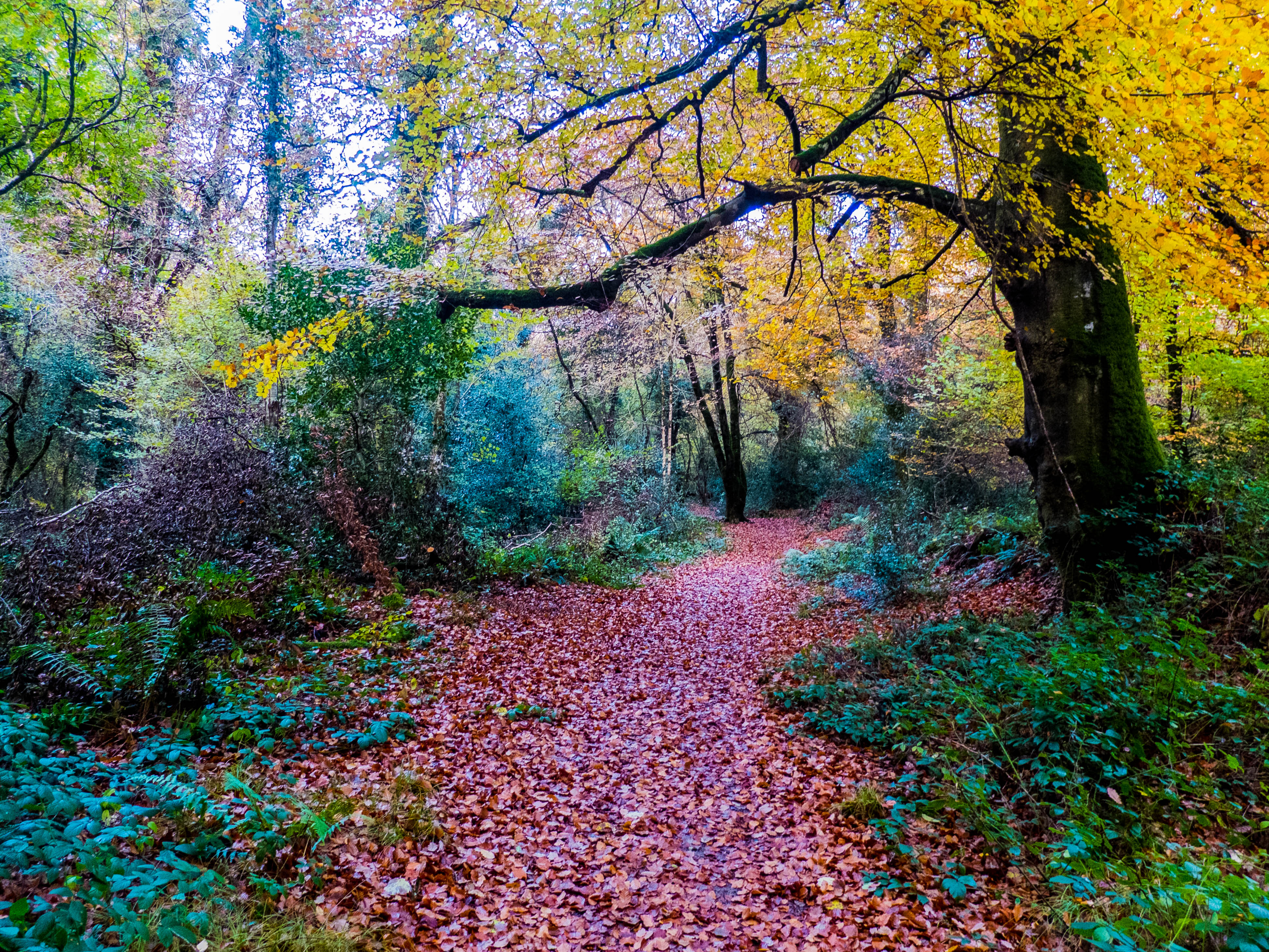
Tomnafinnoge Woods in autumn

Tomnafinnoge Woods (Irish: Coillte Tom na Feannóige) is the last surviving fragment of the great Oak Woods of Tinahely, which once clothed the hills and valleys of south Wicklow, Ireland. As early as 1444 these woods supplied timber for the construction of King's College, Cambridge, and later for Westminster Abbey, St Patrick's Cathedral, Dublin and Trinity College, Dublin. In 1634, the woods were estimated to cover 'more than many thousand acres', but from then on they were heavily exploited especially for shipbuilding.

Some sources say that it was oak from these woods that was originally used to make the old Irish walking sticks, commonly called "Shillelaghs", however this is not true. There is no actual connection between the walking sticks with the village or forest of Shillelagh (Irish: Síol Éalaigh, meaning "descendants of Éalach") in County Wicklow, other than the fact that both the original Irish names have ended up with the same Anglicized pronunciation.

Today the woods are owned and protected by the Irish State. They are included in the Slaney River Valley candidate Special Area of Conservation. A tributary of the Slaney, the River Derry flows through the woods. This is one of the best places in Ireland to see the great spotted woodpecker, which has recently recolonised the country.

== Things to do ==
Tomnafinnoge has several very popular woodland walks, one of the newest walks which opened in 2003 travels along the line of the former railway. It leads from Tomnafinnoge Woods to the nearby town of Tinahely.
