= Croghan Mountain =

Mountain in Counties Wicklow/Wexford, Ireland

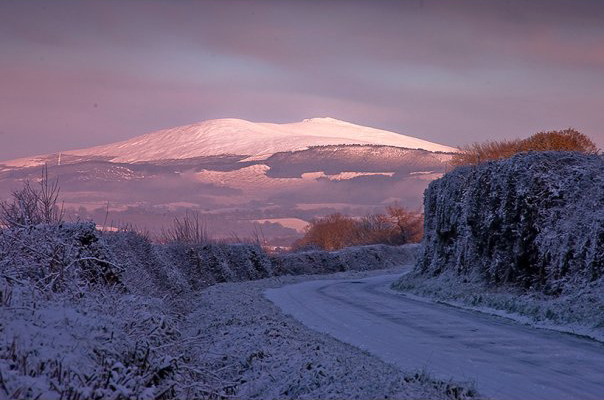
- Croghan, and Croghan East Top, in snow as viewed from Kilcavan, County Wicklow

Highest point
- Elevation: 606 m (1,988 ft)
- Prominence: 520 m (1,710 ft)
- Listing: Marilyn, Arderin, Simm, Vandeleur-Lynam
- Coordinates: 52°48′N 6°19′W

Naming
- Native name: Cruachán Uí Chinnsealaigh
- English translation: little stack of Kinsella

Geography
- Location within island of Ireland
- Location: Wicklow/Wexford border, Ireland
- Parent range: Wicklow Mountains
- OSI/OSNI grid: T1309672884
- Topo map: OSi Discovery 62

Geology
- Rock type(s): Basalt and gabbro

Croghan Mountain, also known as Croghan Kinsella or Croghan Kinshelagh (Irish: Cruachán Uí Chinnsealaigh, meaning 'little stack of the Kinsella family') at 606 metres (1,988 ft), is the 211th–highest peak in Ireland on the Arderin scale, and the 258th–highest peak on the Vandeleur-Lynam scale. Croghan is situated at the far southeastern end of the Wicklow Mountains on the County Wicklow and Wexford border, in Ireland.

== Naming ==
The fuller name comes from the Uí Chinnsealaigh, who were the dominant gaelic family in the area; and is used to differentiate it from other "Cruachan" mountains.

== History ==
The Wicklow gold rush of 1795 began after gold was discovered on the northern slopes of the mountain during tree felling.

== Geography ==
Croghan is situated at the far southeastern end of the Wicklow Mountains on the County Wicklow and Wexford border, in Ireland. Croghan is separated from the main range on its own small massif that includes neighbouring Croghan East Top 562 metres (1,844 ft) (which gives Croghan the profile of a "double peak"), and Slievefoore 414 metres (1,358 ft) to the east. Croghan is the source of the River Bann with rises from its southern slopes.

== Raheenleagh Wind Farm ==
The eastern side of Croghan contains the Raheenleagh Wind Farm, which was a 32.2 MW Coillte-ESB Group joint venture project that opened on 20 September 2016. The wind farm was constructed in an existing Coillte forest, and consists of 11 Siemens Wind Power (108 – DD – 3.2MW) wind turbines. The project received planning permission in 2012, and a 17-month construction process started in mid-2015.

In 2018, it was reported that Coillte had sold their 50 percent stake to Greencoat Renewables.

== See also ==
- Wicklow Way
- Wicklow Mountains
- Lists of mountains in Ireland
- List of mountains of the British Isles by height
- List of Marilyns in the British Isles

== Bibliography ==
- MountainViews Online Database (Simon Stewart) (2013). A Guide to Ireland's Mountain Summits: The Vandeleur-Lynams & the Arderins. Collins Books. ISBN 978-1-84889-164-7.
