= Ballycanew =

Village in County Wexford, Ireland

Ballycanew Baile Uí Chonnmhaí
- Village
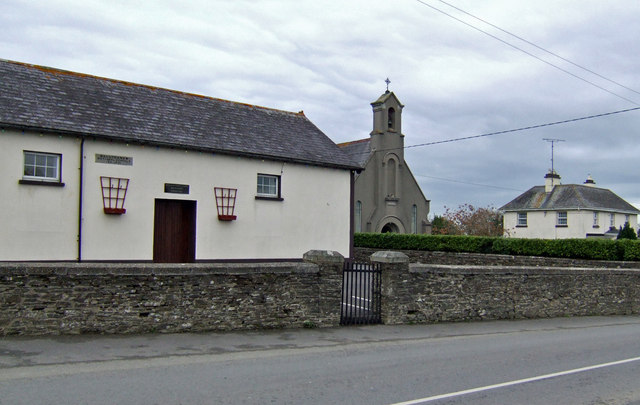
- Parish hall and church

- Location in Ireland
- Coordinates: 52°36′32″N 6°18′36″W
- Country: Ireland
- Province: Leinster
- County: County Wexford
- Elevation: 60 m (200 ft)

Population (2022)
  - Total: 544
- Time zone: UTC+0 (WET)
  - Summer (DST): UTC-1 (IST (WEST))
- Irish Grid Reference: T146524

Ballycanew (historically Ballyconway, from Irish: Baile Uí Chonnmhaí) is a small rural village in County Wexford, Ireland. It is on the R741 road, about 8 km (5 mi) south of Gorey. This road is locally known as the "Coast Road". The village is in a townland and civil parish of the same name. The Ounavarra River passes through the village.

== History ==
The village was once known as Ballyconway. An old Irish name for Ballycanew is 'Baile Gan Uaigh' - Town without a grave.

The earliest reference is 1247 when Theodore de Nevel held lands there. In 1821, the population was 1094, but following the great famine it was reduced to 361.

In the past, the Furney family owned a mill, built in 1589 and demolished in 1962. The old creamery was once a thriving industry, with an average of 2.5 million imperial gallons (11,000 m^{3}) of milk supplied per annum.

In June 1965, a Bronze Age grave was discovered in the Ballycanew Parish. This grave yielded a slightly damaged food vessel and broken human bones. The exact date of the burial is uncertain but is probably more than 3,000 years old.

== Amenities ==
The area is served by a primary school, Saint Enda's National School. There are two churches, St Moling's is part of the Roman Catholic parish of Camolin, and St. Mogue's is part of Church of Ireland parish of Gorey. The village has two shops and two pubs. It also has three community halls, a fast food outlet and a hairdressers.

== Public transport ==
Wexford Bus route 884 serves Ballycanew from Monday through Sunday linking it to Gorey and Wexford. The nearest railway station is Gorey railway station on the Rosslare Europort to Dublin line.

== See also ==
- List of towns and villages in Ireland
