= Monaseed =

Village in County Wexford, Ireland

Coordinates: 52°43′N 6°23′W

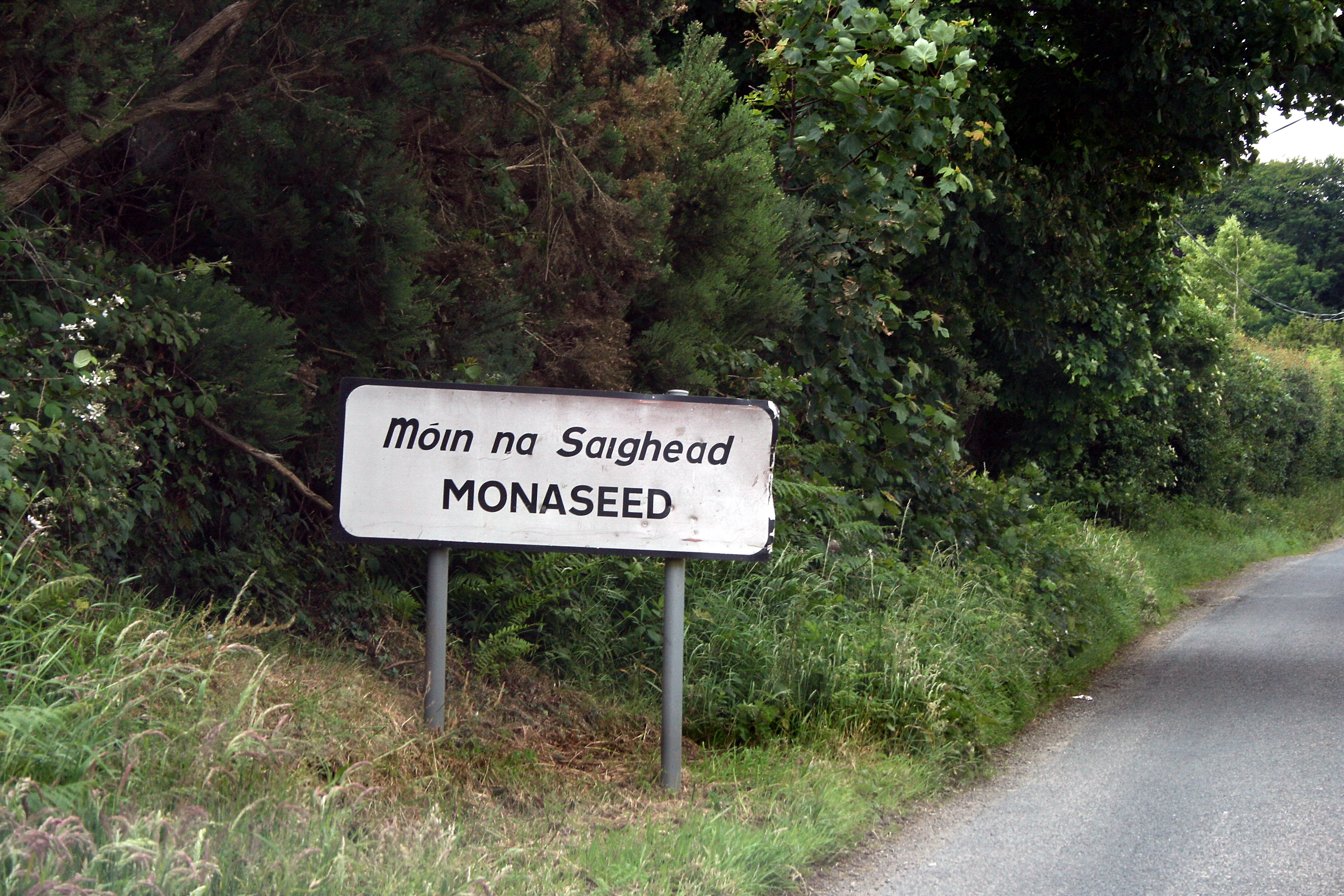
Road sign on approach to Monaseed

Monaseed (Irish: Móin Na Saighead, meaning 'boggy place of flint arrows') is a small village in north County Wexford. The small village centre comprises a primary national school (established in 1913), a Catholic church, and a community hall. Monaseed is approximately 4 km from Craanford, and 14 km from the larger town of Gorey. Monaseed is one half of a parish with the other half being the village of Craanford.

The Myles Byrne Community Hall was built in 1948 and dedicated to the memory of Myles Byrne on 150th anniversary of the Irish Rebellion of 1798.

== History ==
The English King James I decreed the plantation of the north of County Wexford with foreigners, clearing out the owners and occupiers of the land. Monaseed Castle was built in 1613 and granted to William Marwood. The subsequent plantation caused a huge displacement of local families, some of whom were transported to Virginia. In 1630, according to one source, '[The] Plantation in the Co. has extirpated the Irish almost quite.' Following the Cromwellian invasion soon after, Monaseed Castle was destroyed, and only four Irishmen still resided in Monaseed.

== Education ==
Monaseed National School was established in 1913. Some repairs were carried out in 1965, but by the 1980s it was in a poor condition, and refurbishment took place in 1991. New classrooms were added as well as a staff room and a learning support room. A prefab was added in 2002 when Monaseed grew to include 5 teachers, 4 classroom teachers and a shared learning support teacher. In 2008, two new art classrooms were officially opened.

== Notable people ==
- Myles Byrne, leader in the 1798 Rebellion
- Donal McCann, actor

== See also ==
- List of towns and villages in Ireland
