= The Harrow, County Wexford =

Village in County Wexford, Ireland

Coordinates: 52°33′18″N 6°27′21″W

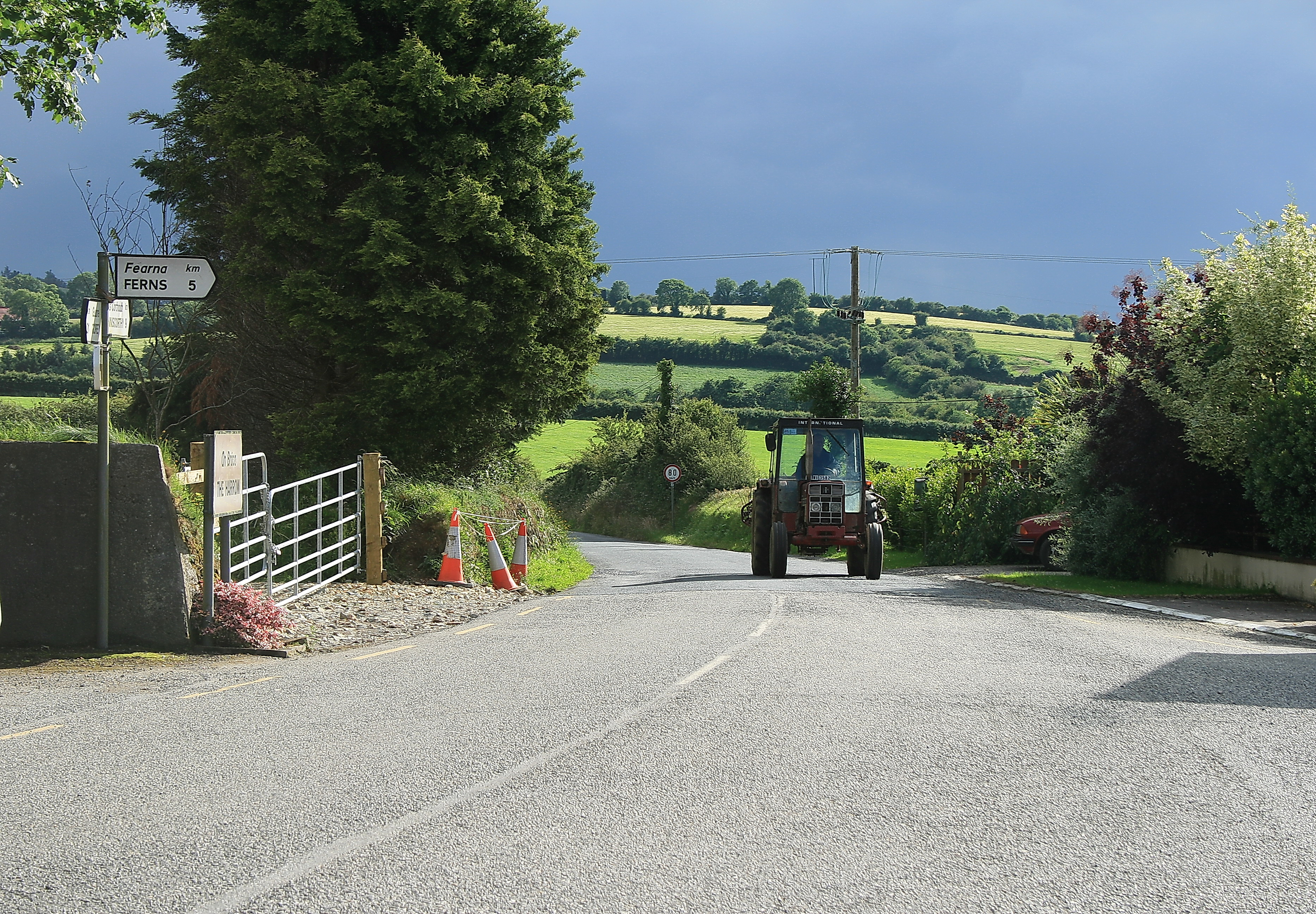
The Harrow

The Harrow (Irish: An Bráca) is a small rural village in County Wexford in the southeastern corner of Ireland. It is situated 5 km (3.1 mi) east of Ferns.

Pat Redmond bred the 1946 Irish Greyhound Derby champion "Steve" in the village.

== See also ==
- List of towns and villages in Ireland
