= Carnew =

Village in County Wicklow, Ireland

Carnew Carn an Bhua
- Village
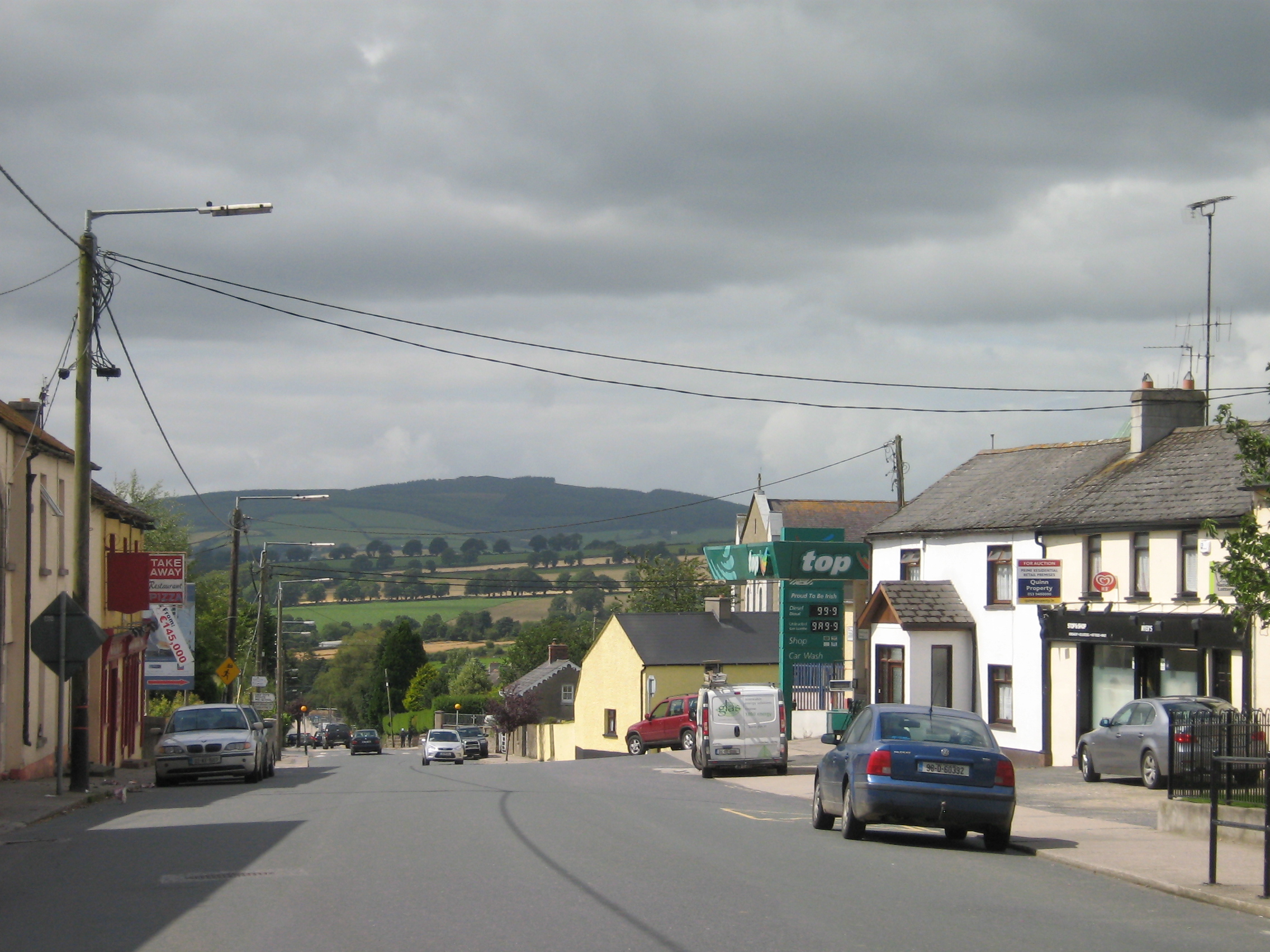
- R725 road through the village

- Location in Ireland
- Coordinates: 52°42′32″N 6°29′42″W
- Country: Ireland
- Province: Leinster
- County: County Wicklow
- Elevation: 105 m (344 ft)

Population (2022)
  - Total: 1,233
- Irish Grid Reference: T013631

Carnew (Irish: Carn an Bhua, meaning 'victory mound') is a village in County Wicklow, Ireland. It is the most southerly town in Wicklow situated just a mile from the border with County Wexford. For historical reasons it has often been described as "a Protestant enclave". The village is in a civil parish of the same name.

== Location ==
Carnew is a market town situated in the extreme south of County Wicklow, almost on the County Wexford border, and not far from the County Carlow border. It is on the R725 (Carlow to Gorey road) and R748 road.

== Transport ==
Bus Éireann route 132 from Rosslare Europort to Dublin serves Carnew on Thursdays only providing a means of travelling into Tallaght or Dublin for a few hours. Cousins Coach Hire (for TFI Local Link Carlow Kilkenny Wicklow) operate a Monday to Friday commuter route (1393) from Shillelagh stopping in Carnew, linking the two areas to Gorey. Bernard Kavanagh & Sons (for TFI Local Link Carlow Kilkenny Wicklow) operate Route 800A which connects Carnew with Arklow twice daily on weekdays, serving Coolboy, Shilellagh, Annacurragh, Woodenbridge along the way.

== History ==
Carnew made its first appearance in historical records in 1247 as the Norman borough of "Carnebothe" with its own Royal Charter granted by King Henry III of England.

A Welshman, Calcott Chambre, leased Carnew Castle in 1619, and over the following two decades established a large iron smelting industry just outside the town. He encouraged Welsh families to settle in the area, and created one of the country's largest deer parks, with a radius of about seven Irish miles.

During the Rebellion of 1641 Chambre and about 160 settlers were besieged in the castle for 22 weeks, compelled to feed on carcasses that "had long lain in lime pits", by a force of around 1,000 insurgents led by the Mastersons, Byrnes and Donal Kavanagh of Ballingate, who also "pulled down ye pulpits, burned ye seats and defaced and demolished the church of Carnowe". When the besieged finally surrendered some of them were hanged, some were detained for service while the largest number, including Chambre, were accompanied by a convoy to Dublin. The castle was held by the Knockloe O'Byrnes until 1649, when it was taken by Sir Richard Talbot. Two years later the castle took a pounding from Cromwell's Roundheads under the command of Colonel Hewson during the course of which the roof was destroyed. In 1655 an edict was issued ordering all "inhabitants of Carne, Coolattin and Clohamon who had not shown good affection" to be banished, and their property shared amongst the Adventurers.

Protestant colonisers arrived during the second half of the 17th century when the exploitation of the great oak forest of Shillelagh was at its peak; many were skilled specialists such as bellows makers, founders, finers and hammer men, who worked in the local ironworks, which used vast quantities of oak for the manufacture of charcoal to smelt iron ore shipped from Bristol.

== 1798 rebellion ==
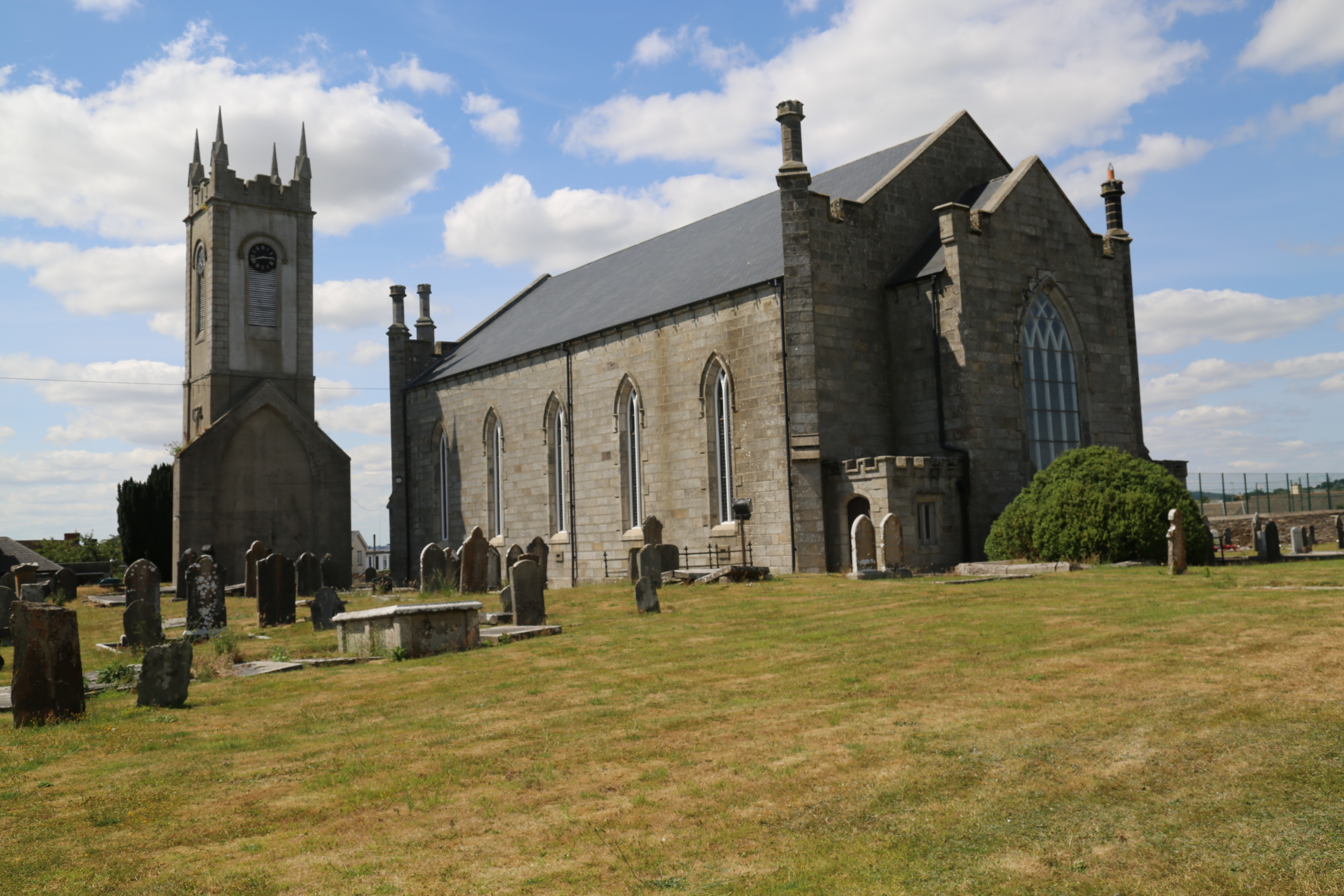
All Saints, Church of Ireland

On the morning of 25 May, news of the long-expected outbreak of the 1798 rebellion in neighboring County Kildare and of military losses in the battles of Ballymore-Eustace, Naas, and Prosperous had reached the garrison in Carnew, who decided to take preventative measures by assembling the rebel suspects in detention. The suspects were marched from Carnew Castle to the local handball alley and executed by firing squad as a warning to the local populace.

On 4 June, the government evacuated the town and four days later it was attacked and burned in a revenge raid by Wexford rebels, led by "the screeching general" Anthony Perry.

On 30 June, rebel forces inflicted a heavy defeat on government cavalry at the Ballyellis ambush. Crown losses numbered 49 but many more died as a result of injuries sustained in the battle. Casualties included 25 of the Regiment of Ancient Britons.

Following the battle Carnew was once again attacked. The loyalists under the command of Captain Thomas Swan of Tombreane barricaded themselves in Blayney's Malthouse (now Quinn's estate agents). The rebels failed in their efforts to either dislodge them or to set the building on fire, and incurred 19 casualties in their efforts to do so.

Carnew's most infamous daughter, Bridget "Croppy Biddy" Dolan, spent three months as a camp follower with the rebels. As a paid government informer, she helped to convict many of her former associates and relatives. Her most notable victim was Billy Byrne of Ballymanus who was hanged in Wicklow Gaol in September 1799. On Dolan's evidence, at least nine Carnew men were transported to New South Wales in 1802. In later life she was compelled to eke out a living from the poor box in the town's Protestant church. She was stoned every time she appeared in public, and kept two bulldogs for her protection. She died aged 50 in 1827, and is the only member of her family to be interred in Carnew's Church of Ireland churchyard.

The early decades of the 19th century saw the rebuilding of Carnew and Tinahely, heavily funded by the Coollattin Estate. Carnew Castle was re-roofed and modernised for the arrival as rector in 1813 of a brother in law of Earl Fitzwilliam, Rev. Richard Ponsonby (later Bishop of Derry). His successor, Revd Henry Moore, who built the high castle wall, strongly opposed Earl Fitzwilliam and his agent Bob Challoner's efforts to provide an interdenominational school (now Carnew Enterprise Centre) as a means of healing old wounds. Following a Chancery Court ruling, Moore got his way and was allowed to build a Protestant school on the only site available to him, the corner of the churchyard. Fitzwilliam's reaction was to evict the rector from the castle.

Sectarian strife was never far below the surface. During the latter part of the century there were prosecutions for the removal of a Union Jack from the churchyard on 12 July. In court, discretion generally prevailed and the offenders were released with a warning.

== Sport ==
Carnew has a Gaelic Athletic Association team, the Carnew Emmets. Their colours are blue and gold. They are the 2009 Wicklow senior hurling champions. They provide a large number of members of the Wicklow senior hurling team. For many years Carnew was also home to a soccer team called Carnew Celtic.

== People ==
- Calcot Chambre, 17th-century parliamentarian, died and buried in Carnew.
- Lillie Connolly, Irish trade union organiser and wife of Irish revolutionary James Connolly, was born in Carnew.
