= Kilcavan, County Wicklow =

Townlands in County Wicklow, Ireland

Coordinates: 52.731°N 6.476°W

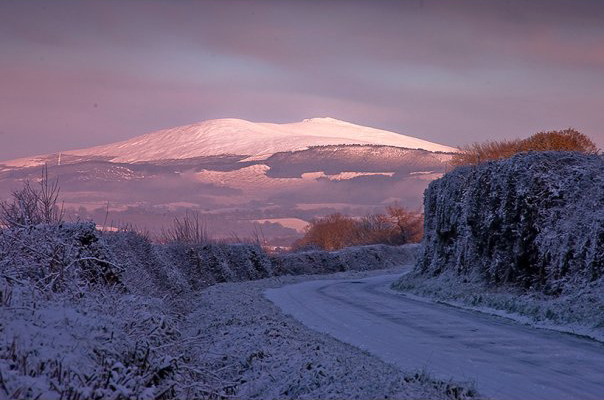
View of Croghan mountain in the snow from Kilcavan

Kilcavan is an area in south County Wicklow in Ireland, approximately 5 kilometres (3.1 mi) north-east of Carnew. The area, comprising the townlands of Kilcavan Lower and Kilcavan Upper, is located at the southern end of the Wicklow Mountains.

== Name ==
The Irish language name of the area is Cill Chaomháin, referring to a church (cill) associated with a person named Caomhán. Early anglicised versions of this name include a reference, in the Calendar of Patent Rolls of James I (1608), to Killkavane. Other references include Kilkevine (1636), Killcavan (c. 1660), and Kilkeavan (1667). 19th century records, attributed to place-name archivist John O'Donovan, refer to Cill Caemhain or "St Cavan's church".

== History ==
=== Former church ===
Near the R748 road between Carnew and the Kilcavan Gap, in Kilcavan Upper, is the site of an ecclesiastical enclosure. This circular enclosure is marked as the site of Kilcavan Church on mid-19th century Ordnance Survey maps. Today there is very little left of the church except scattered granite stones and a "crude Latin cross (WI047-006003-)" which is incorporated in a field boundary to the south of the church site.

Kilcavan Church was named after Saint Caomháin, who founded the monastery of Airdne Coemain, now Ardcavan, County Wexford, c. 548. Caomháin may be the same priest named Caeman of Dairinis in other sources, who Saint Finnian of Clonard, visited before he went to Aghowle.

=== Quarrying ===
From at least 1800 until the early 1940s, the slate quarries of Kilcavan provided a source of employment for local inhabitants. The extracted slate, which was "of a dark colour", was mainly exported, but also used locally and elsewhere within Ireland.

In addition to slate and stone for building, the quarries at Kilcavan also exported the component used as a base for the "Battleship Gray" paint used on warships. The slate quarry closed in 1942.

=== Land use ===
In the very early nineteenth century the area was in the control of Lord Fitzwilliam and was originally leased only to Protestants. This changed after 1808, and Catholics were given the chance to sub-lease land.
