= Gorey =

Town in County Wexford, Ireland

Gorey Guaire
- Town
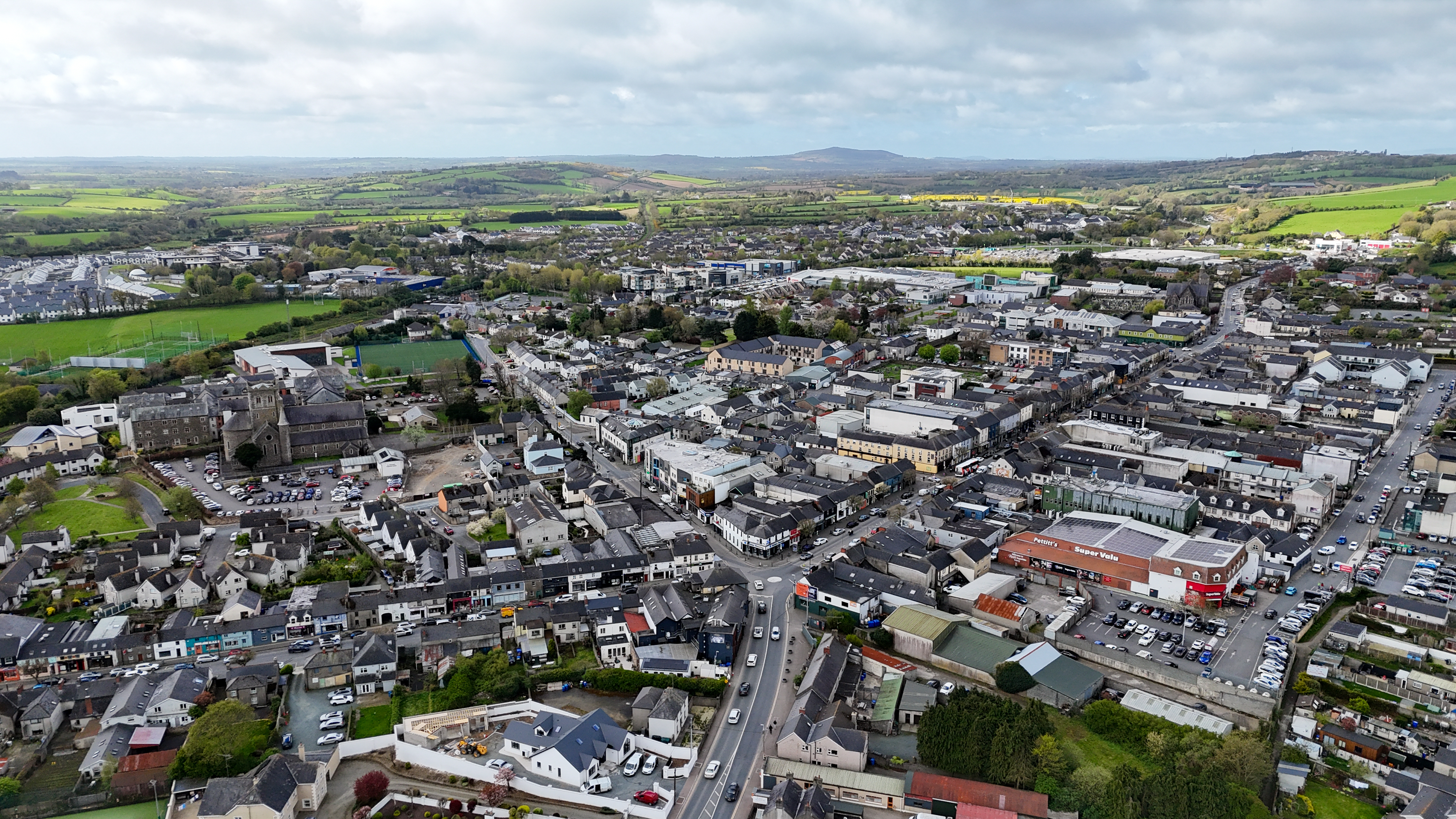
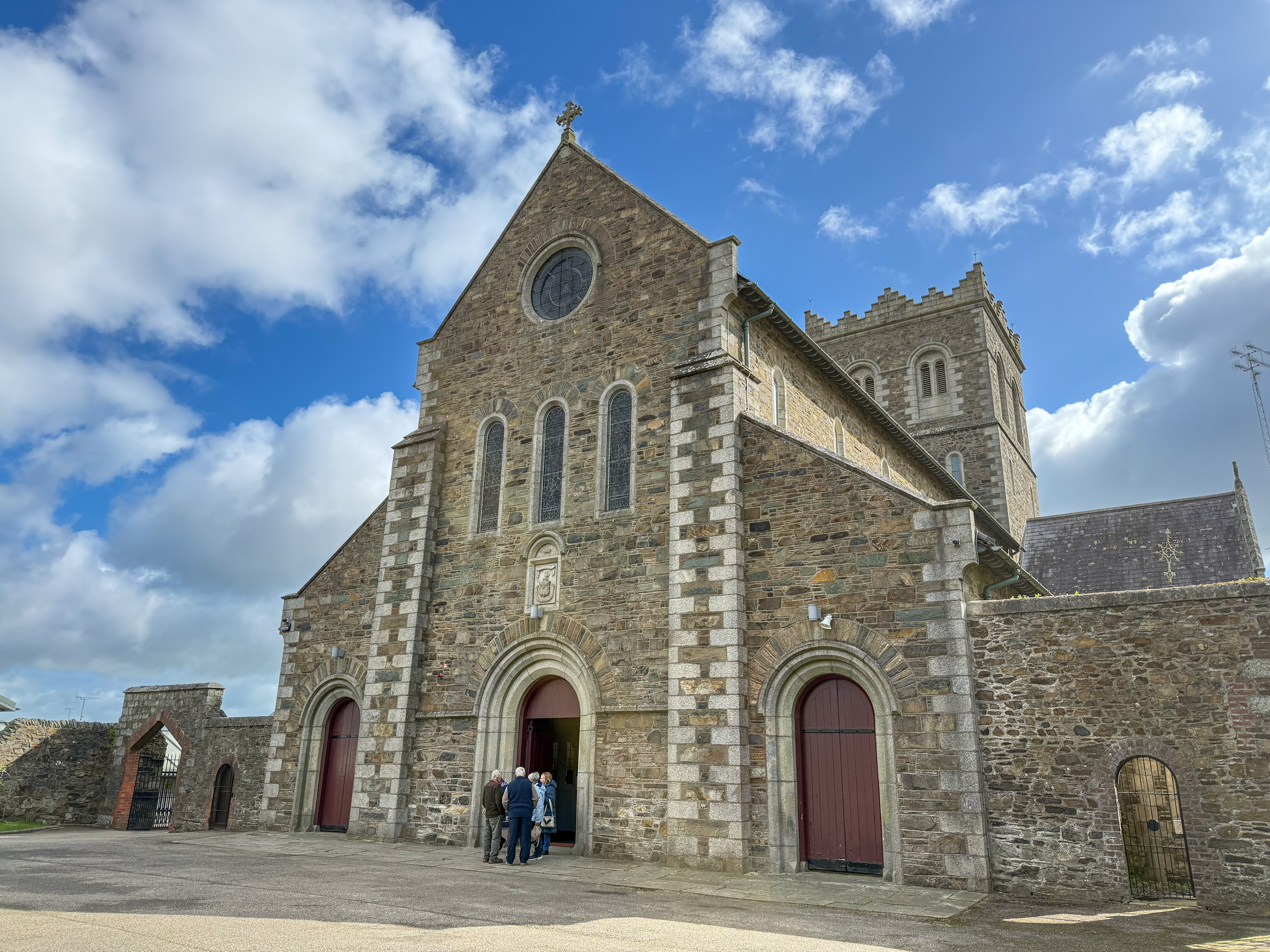
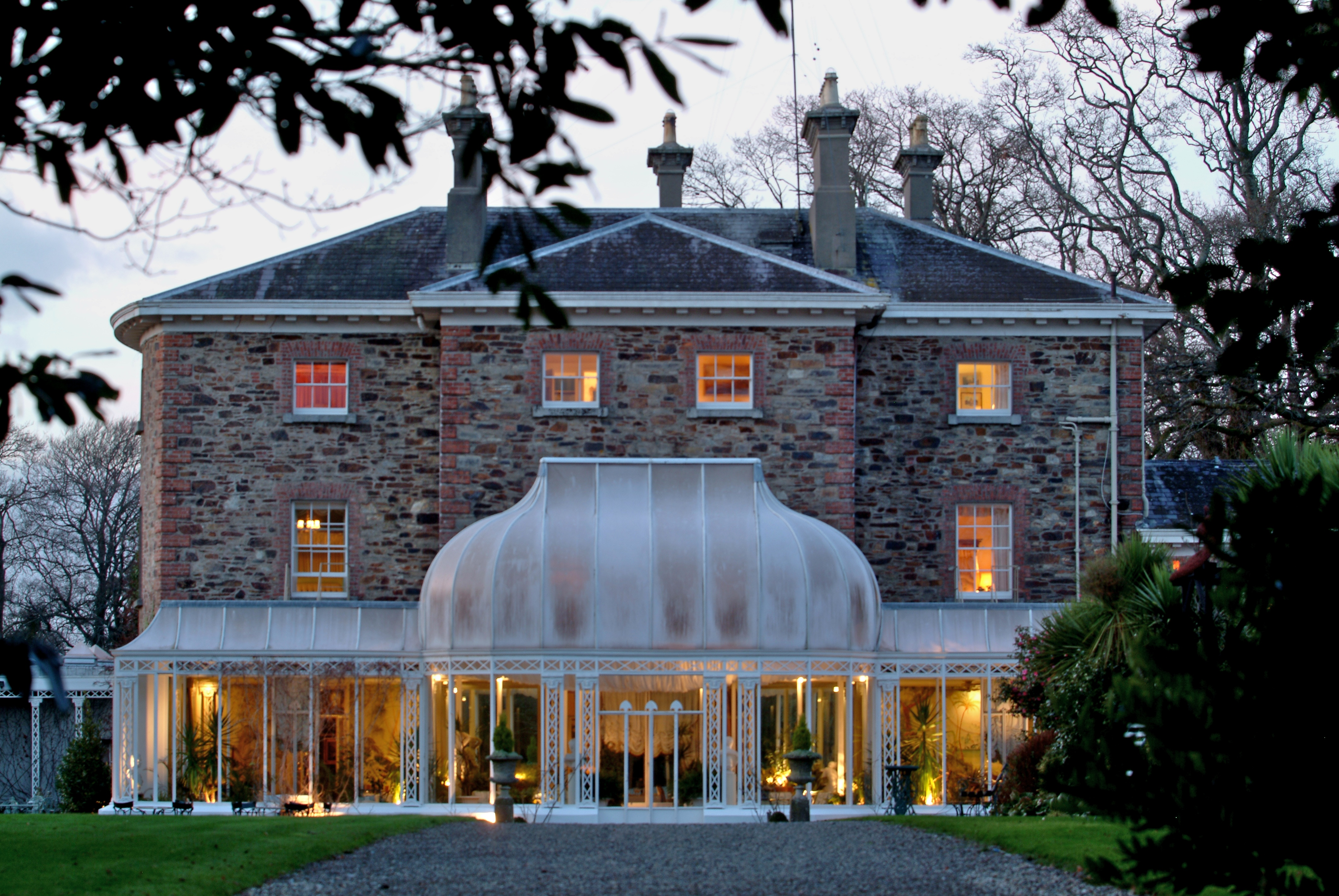
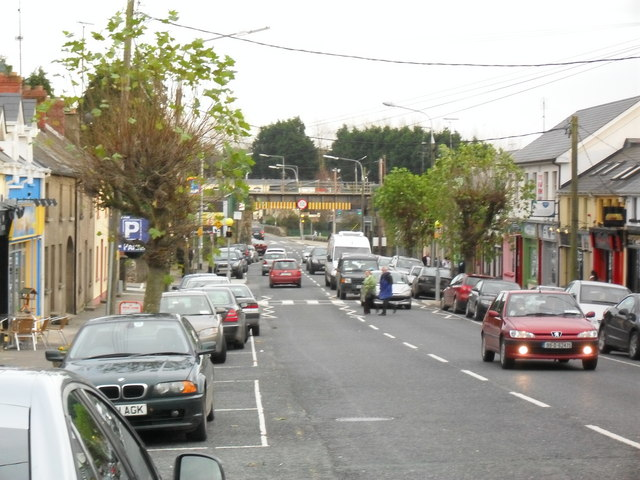
- Town skyline Christ Church St Michael's Church Marlfield House Esmonde Street

- Coat of arms

- Location in Ireland
- Coordinates: 52.677°N 6.292°W
- Country: Ireland
- Province: Leinster
- County: County Wexford
- Elevation: 48 m (157 ft)

Population (2022)
  - Total: 11,517
- Time zone: UTC±0 (WET)
  - Summer (DST): UTC+1 (IST)
- Eircode routing key: Y25
- Telephone area code: +353(0)53
- Irish Grid Reference: T151598

Gorey (Irish: Guaire) is a market town in north County Wexford, Ireland. It is bypassed by the main M11 Dublin to Wexford road. The town is also connected to the railway network along the same route. Local newspapers include the Gorey Guardian.

As a growing commuter town to Dublin for some residents, there has been an increase in population in the early 21st century. Between 1996 and 2002, the population of the surrounding district grew by 23%, and the town itself almost trebled in population (from 3,939 to 11,517 inhabitants) in the period between the 1996 and 2022 census.

== Name ==
While the town and parish were sometimes historically known as Kilmichaelogue (Irish: Cill Mhocheallóg, meaning 'church of Mocheallóg'), the town's modern English name may derive from the Irish Gabhraighe, meaning a "a place abounding in goats".

The town was granted a charter as a borough in 1619, under the name Newborough. However, as noted in A Topographical Dictionary of Ireland (published in 1837 by Samuel Lewis) and in Wexford Guide and Directory (published by George Henry Bassett in 1885), this name "never [grew] into general use" as the "inhabitants did not take kindly to the name chosen for the town".

== History ==
Historical population
Year	Pop.	±%
1821	2,132	—
1831	3,944	+85.0%
1841	3,365	−14.7%
1851	2,972	−11.7%
1861	2,673	−10.1%
1871	2,639	−1.3%
1881	2,450	−7.2%
1891	2,213	−9.7%
1901	2,178	−1.6%
1911	2,339	+7.4%
1926	2,296	−1.8%
1936	2,323	+1.2%
1946	2,687	+15.7%
1951	2,889	+7.5%
1956	2,816	−2.5%
1961	2,671	−5.1%
1966	2,858	+7.0%
1971	3,024	+5.8%
1981	3,554	+17.5%
1986	3,884	+9.3%
1991	3,850	−0.9%
1996	3,939	+2.3%
2002	5,282	+34.1%
2006	7,293	+38.1%
2011	9,114	+25.0%
2016	9,822	+7.8%
2022	11,517	+17.3%

Evidence of ancient settlement in the area includes a number of standing stone, fulacht fiadh, burnt mound, holy well and ringfort sites in the townlands of Gorey Hill, Gorey Corporation Lands and Ramstown Lower.

Among the earliest written recordings relating to Gorey are Norman records from 1296 which refer to an existing town on the site. Several centuries later, in 1619, the town was granted a charter as a borough, under the name Newborough. The borough charter had been obtained by the then Bishop of Ferns and Leighlin, Thomas Ram (1564–1634).

As the principal local landlords, the Ram family laid-out the town as a "planned town" in the early 17th century. Together with several other developments in the area, the Ram family also built a large estate to the north of the town. The manor house of this estate, Ramsfort, was burned following the Irish Rebellion of 1641, and again during the Irish Rebellion of 1798. Ramsfort house was rebuilt in the 19th century to designs attributed to architect Daniel Robertson.

In addition to Gorey's 18th century market house, many of the larger buildings within the town itself date to the mid-19th century. These include Gorey railway station which dates to 1863, the Church of Ireland church (Kilmakilloge) dating to 1861, and the Roman Catholic church (dedicated to Saint Michael) completed in 1843. Gorey was the centre of several conflicts during the 1798 Rebellion, and a memorial to these events was erected in the town in the rebellion's centenary year (1898).

The parents of Jim Bolger, the former Prime Minister of New Zealand, emigrated from Gorey in the 1930s.

== Amenities ==
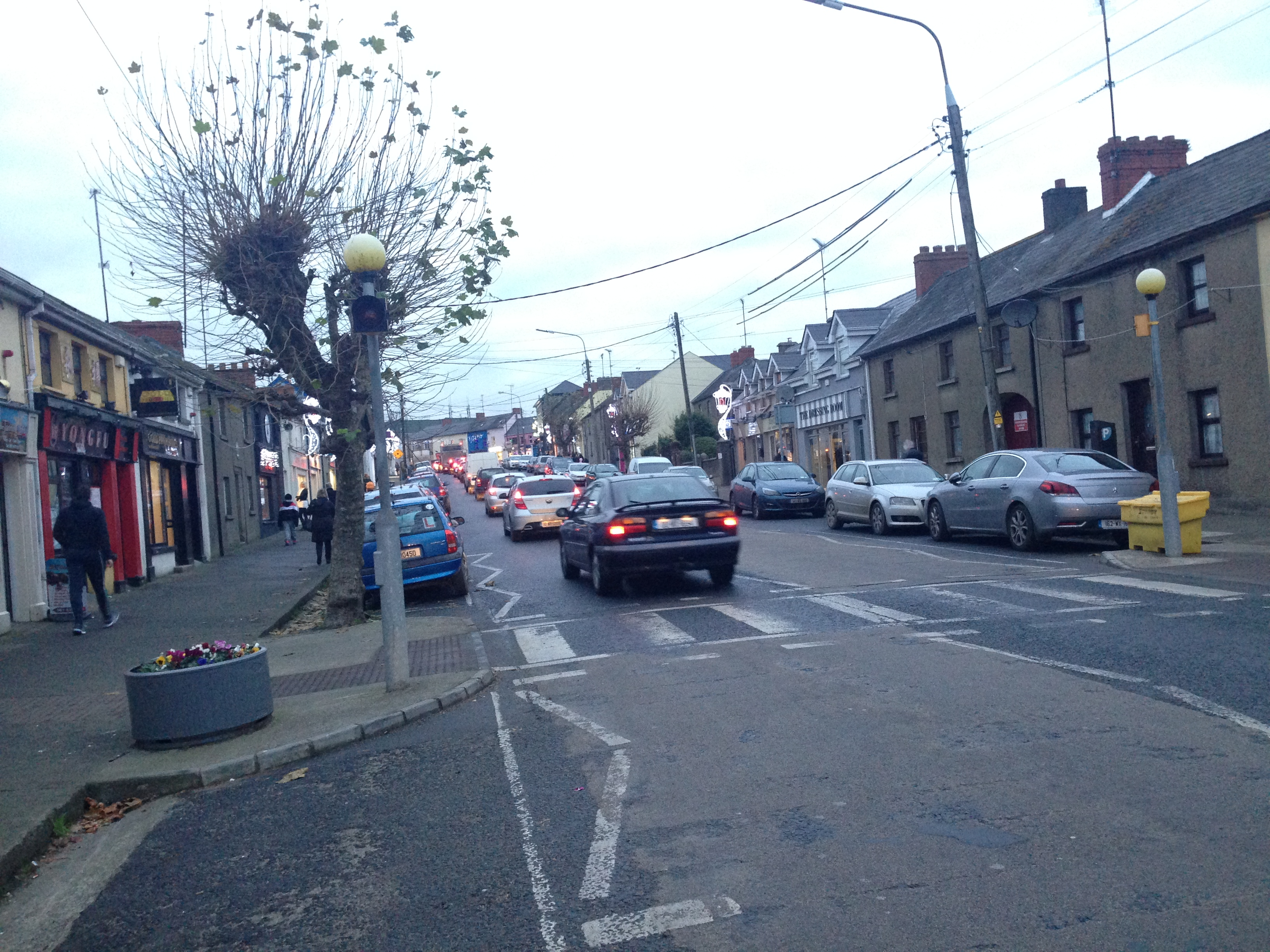
Esmonde Street

Courtown Harbour or Courtown, a small holiday resort used by weekend visitors from Dublin, is situated 6 km (3.7 mi) east of Gorey.

The town marked the 150th anniversary of the consecration of Christ Church (Kilmakilloge) in 2011. The church, which was completed in 1861, was designed by James Welland, one of the provincial architects of the Ecclesiastical Commissioners of the Church of Ireland. Its stained glass windows were designed by Harry Clarke and Catherine O'Brien.

== Sport ==
Naomh Éanna GAA was founded in 1970 by a group of Christian Brothers. Naomh Éanna's club ground is called Pairc Uí Síochain located at the top of Clonattin Gorey, County Wexford. Naomh Éanna won their first senior hurling county title in 2018.

There are also two soccer clubs located in the town: Gorey Rangers and Gorey Celtic. Gorey Rangers are located at The Showgrounds and Ramstown, while Gorey Celtic are located in Mullaunfin Creagh on the outskirts of the town.

Gorey Rugby Club is located at Clonattin. Former players include Nick Popplewell and Robin Copeland.

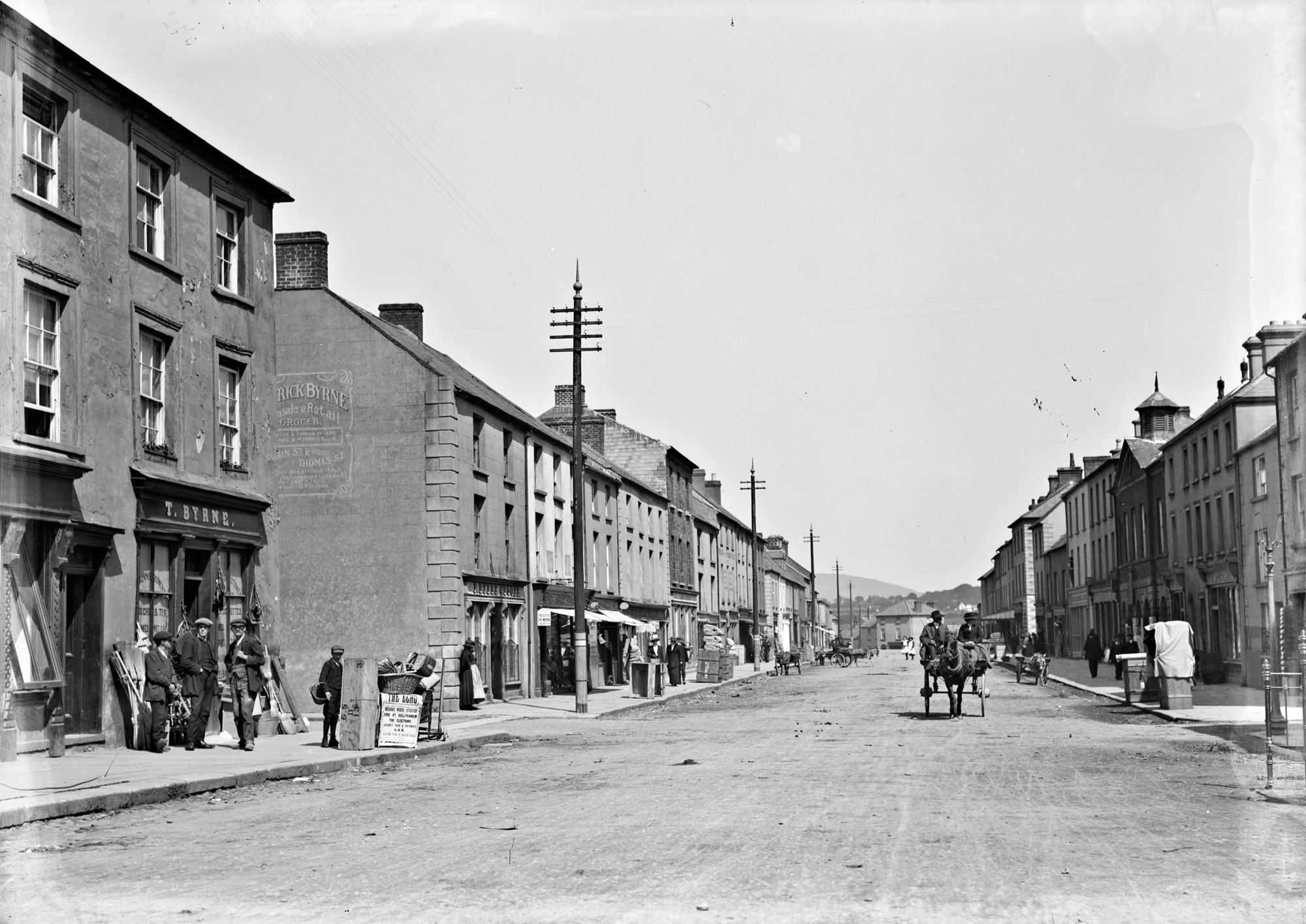
Shops on Gorey Main Street, c.1920s

== Education ==
Gorey's largest secondary school, Gorey Community School has over 1,500 students. In 2011 another post-primary school, Creagh College, opened to accommodate Gorey's increased population of secondary school students. Then, in 2021 an Educate Together Secondary School opened to accommodate more second-level students. Five local primary schools, Gorey Educate Together National School, Gorey Loreto Primary, Saint Joseph's Primary, Gorey Central School and Gaelscoil Moshíológ Guaire feed the secondary schools in Gorey, as do a number of schools in the surrounding area. Gorey School of Art is Post Leaving Certificate school for the arts.

The library in Gorey opened its doors in 2011 - after a decade of plans to build it.

== Transport ==
Gorey railway station opened on 16 November 1863. It is located on the Dublin to Rosslare Europort line, and is served by a total of 12 trains per weekday.

The town lies on the N11 road route (Dublin-to-Rosslare) and, until a bypass consisting of 23km of dual carriageway was opened in 2007, local traffic congestion was an issue. The by-pass was upgraded to motorway status in August 2009.

Several bus services serve Gorey, with most serving the Main Street's two opposing bus stops. Bus Éireann's Expressway route 2 links the town with Dublin Airport, Dublin and Wexford. Bus Éireann also operates route 379 between Gorey, Ballycanew and Wexford on Mondays and Saturdays only.

Wexford Bus's route 740 links Gorey with Wexford, Dublin and Dublin Airport. The company's route 740A also provides a service to Dublin Airport via Arklow and Wicklow. Route UM11 is operated by Wexford Bus between Gorey and Maynooth University during term time for students. It also operates route 389 under the TFI Local Link brand.

Gorey Bus Links operates route 879 from Gorey Shopping Centre, linking Gorey with Ballycanew, Ballygarrett and Courtown. Dunnes Coaches operates route IW07 between Gorey's Main Street and Carlow College via Camolin.

== Media and entertainment ==
The Gorey Guardian is the local newspaper.

Gorey has had a local theatre group since the 1950s, which hosts a number of performances annually from its 300-seat auditorium.

Gorey Musical Society has one production a year, and its 2007 staging of Oklahoma! received the 'Best Overall Show' award at the Association of Irish Musical Societies awards in Killarney.

Gorey Choral Group, a mixed-voice choir founded in the 1970s, has participated in a number of contests and won the first plan in the jazz and popular music section of the 2016 Cork International Choral Festival.

For 15 years during the 1970s and early 1980s, the Gorey Arts Festival, organised by local artist Paul Funge, was held in the town during the summer. Performers at the festival included U2, Horslips, Chris de Burgh, Christy Moore, Planxty, Makem and Clancy, Niall Tóibín and Eamon Morrissey.

Every year, varying from late July to early August, Gorey's main street closes over several days for the Market House Festival.

There are a number of pubs, bars, and nightclub in the town. A seven-screen cinema is located on the Courtown road.

== People ==
- Jim Bolger, 35th Prime Minister of New Zealand; parents were born in Gorey
- Paul Boyle, Connacht and Ireland rugby union player
- Billy Byrne, former hurler and All-Ireland winner
- Robin Copeland, Munster, Connacht and Ireland rugby union player
- Ger Cushe, former hurler and All-Ireland winner
- Michael W. D'Arcy, politician
- James Godkin, author and journalist
- Herbert F. Hore, historian, author and archaeologist, born in Clonattin
- Conor McDonald, hurler
- Darragh McDonald, former paralympic gold medalist in swimming
- Colm O'Gorman, director of Amnesty International Ireland
- Alanna O'Kelly, artist, born in Gorey
- Aisling O'Neill, actress, lives in Gorey

== Town twinning ==
Gorey is twinned with Oban in Scotland.

== See also ==
- List of towns and villages in Ireland
- Market Houses in Ireland
