= Mattie Hetherton =

Cavan Gaelic footballer (1951–2021)

Personal information
- Native name: Maitiú Ó hArrachtáin (Irish)
- Born: 1951 Virginia, County Cavan, Ireland
- Died: 6 April 2021 (aged 69) Blanchardstown, Dublin, Ireland
- Height: 5 ft 9 in (175 cm)

Sport
- Sport: Gaelic football
- Position: Midfield
Clubs
- Years: Club
- Munterconnaught; St Mary's
Club titles
- Cavan titles: 1
Inter-county
- Years: County
- 1975–1978: Cavan
Inter-county titles
- Ulster titles: 0
- All-Irelands: 0
- NFL: 0
- All Stars: 0

Matthew Hetherton (1951 – 6 April 2021) was an Irish Gaelic footballer who played for club sides Munterconnaught and St Mary's and at senior level for the Cavan county team.

== Career ==
Hetherton began his Gaelic football career at club level with Munterconnaught. He had his most successful season in 1976 when the club claimed the County Junior Championship title. Within the space of two weeks, Hetherton had also won a County Senior Championship title with a St. Mary's amalgamation and was also named man of the match in the final. By this stage he had also been drafted onto the Cavan senior football team, making his debut during the National League in 1975. Hetherton maintained his place in the panel for three years.

== Death ==
Hetherton had been in poor health for some time and died at St Francis Hospice in Blanchardstown on 6 April 2021.

== Honours ==
Munterconnaught

- Cavan Junior Football Championship: 1976

St Mary's

- Cavan Senior Football Championship: 1976
