= Ramor =

Ramor may refer to two things in County Cavan, Ireland:

- Lough Ramor, a lake
- Ramor United GFC, a Gaelic football club
