= Virginia College, Cavan =

Location
- Virginia, Cavan; Ireland
- Coordinates: 53°49′53.72″N 7°4′59.39″W

Information
- Type: Vocational Education Committee
- Opened: 1962
- School district: Cavan & Monaghan ETB
- Principal: Niall Lynch
- Faculty: 60
- Years offered: 1st–6th, Transition Year, LCA & Cavan institute
- Enrollment: 769
- Colours: Black and red
- Website: virginiacollege.ie

Virginia College, Cavan, formerly Virginia Vocational School Cavan, is the only secondary school in Virginia, Cavan, Ireland. It was founded in 1962. Situated beside Lough Ramor, it is a mixed school educating over 800 pupils. With three new extensions over the years (most recent in 2012), a new extension is being planned for summer 2024. the school houses three ICT suites and a language ICT lab. Results in state exams have increased significantly since its introduction in 2009. The Virginia school celebrated its 50th anniversary in September 2012.

The motto of the school is "Tús Feasa Fiafraí", meaning "The beginning of knowledge is asking".
