= Wheat fly =

Wheat fly is a common name for several insects and may refer to:

- Contarinia tritici
- Mayetiola destructor
- Oscinella soror
- Sitodiplosis mosellana
- Tetramesa tritici
