= Séamus Hetherton =

Irish Gaelic footballer (1930–2019)

Personal information
- Born: 1930 Munterconnaught, County Cavan, Ireland
- Died: 11 July 2019 (aged 89) Birmingham, England
- Occupation: Roman Catholic priest
- Height: 5 ft 9 in (175 cm)

Sport
- Sport: Gaelic football
- Position: Right wing-forward
Club
- Years: Club
- Munterconnaught
Club titles
- Cavan titles: 0
Inter-county
- Years: County
- 1951–1956: Cavan
Inter-county titles
- Ulster titles: 2
- All-Irelands: 1
- NFL: 0

Séamus Hetherton (1930 – 11 July 2019) was an Irish Gaelic footballer who played for Cavan Championship club Munterconnaught. He played at senior level for the Cavan county team for five seasons, during which time he usually lined out at right wing-forward.

Later in life Hetherton became a Catholic priest in England. In 1997 he received a suspended jail sentence in connection with the disappearance of £104,000 from a church bank account.

== Honours ==
St Finian's College

- Leinster Colleges Senior Football Championship (1): 1949

Cavan

- All-Ireland Senior Football Championship (1): 1952
- Ulster Senior Football Championship (2): 1952, 1954
