= Virginia Show =

Annual agricultural show in Ireland

- Genre: Dairy Cow Evaluation, Agricultural and livestock show
- Dates: Wednesday in late August
- Locations: Show Grounds Virginia, County Cavan, Ireland
- Founded: 1800s
- Attendance: c.15,000 (2013)
- Website: www.virginiashow.com

The Virginia Agricultural Show, or Virginia Show is an annual agricultural fair held in the town of Virginia, County Cavan, Ireland. It is held at the Virginia Show Grounds. The current show has been running for over 80 years. The show is known for its dairy cow competition. The 76th edition was the subject of Show Day a documentary short directed by Alan Bradley in 2018.

== Event ==
Over the years, the event has had exhibitions and cow, sheep, dog and goat competitions, as well as arts, and dancing events. There were 490 competition classes in 2012.

=== Irish Champion Cow competition ===
The Irish Champion Cow, known as the "Baileys Irish Champion Cow" for sponsorship reasons, is a dairy cow evaluation competition. Running for more than 30 years, its entrants are judged on aspects such as legs, neck, back and udder qualities. The top prize was worth €8,000 in the mid 2000's, reducing to £2,150 in 2016.

== Virginia Show Grounds ==
As well as an exhibition centre, meeting and sports centre, the Show Grounds is the site of agricultural academic research. It has been used as a temporary COVID-19 testing centre.
