= Castlerahan =

Barony in County Cavan, Ireland

Castlerahan Caisleán Raithin (Irish)
- Barony
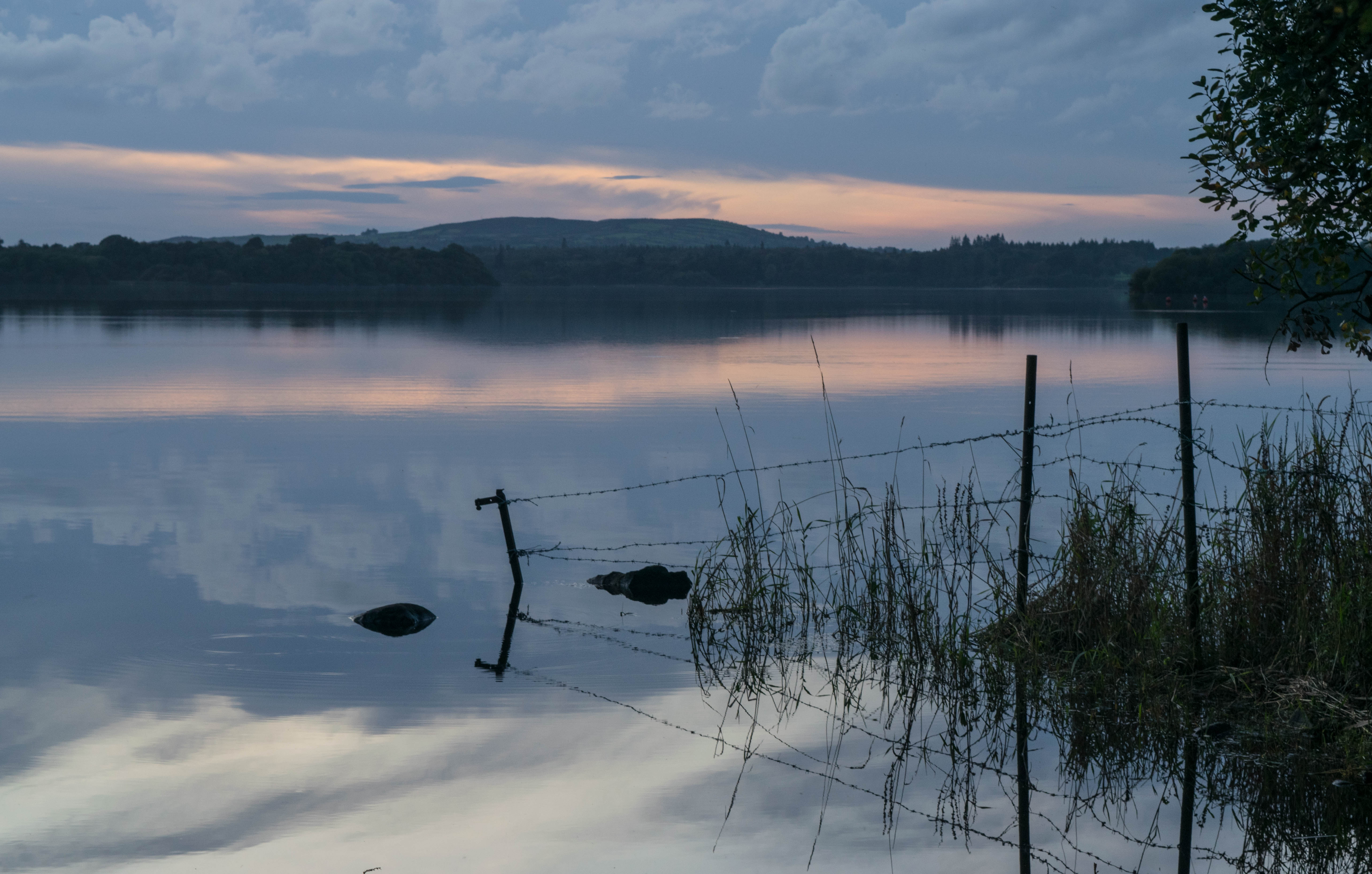
- View of Lough Ramor

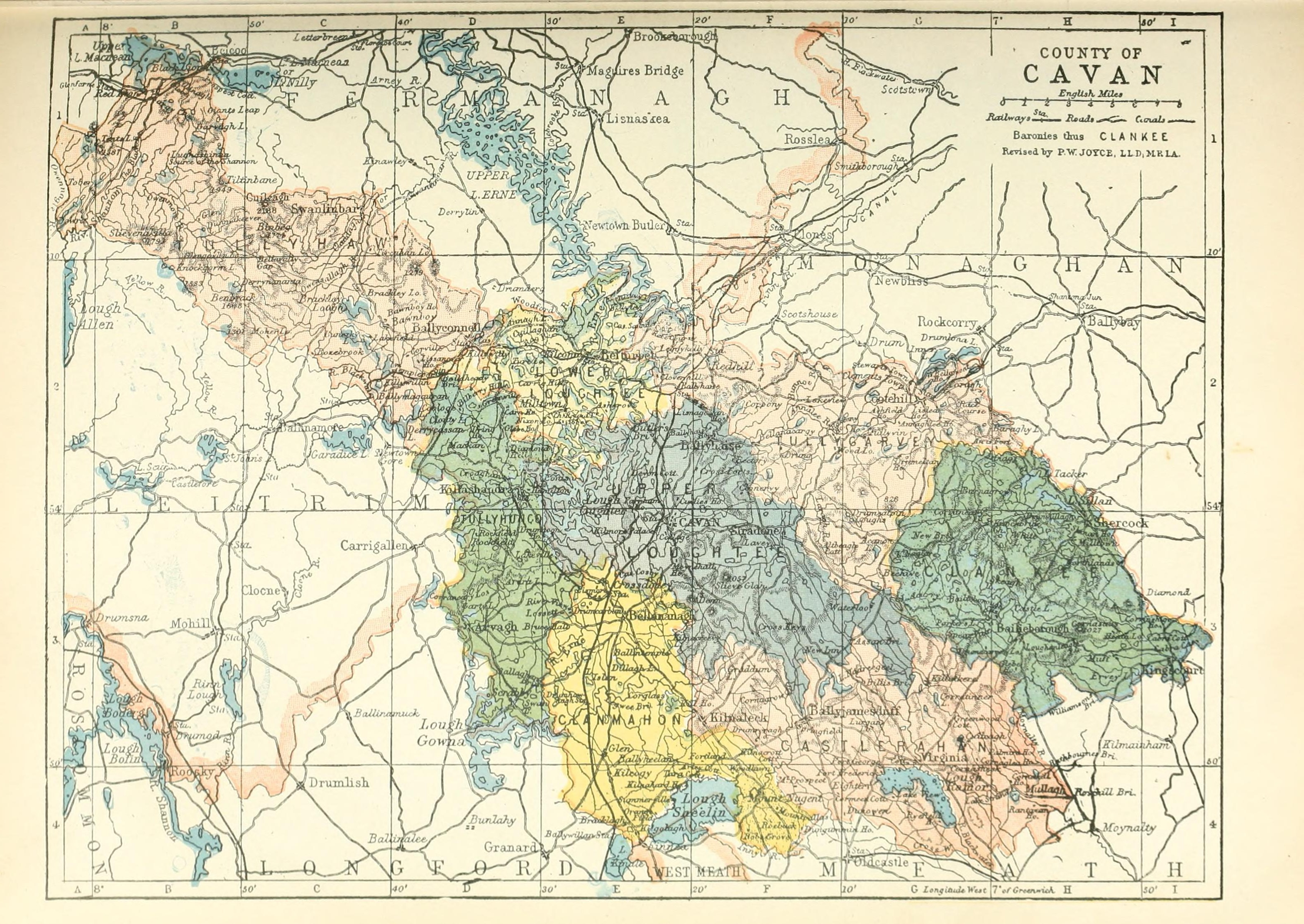
- Barony map of County Cavan, 1900; Castlerahan is in the southeast, coloured peach.
- Sovereign state: Ireland
- Province: Ulster
- County: Cavan

Area
  - Total: 280.36 km^{2} (108.25 sq mi)

Castlerahan (Irish: Caisleán Raithin) is a barony in County Cavan, Ireland. Baronies were mainly cadastral rather than administrative units. They acquired modest local taxation and spending functions in the 19th century before being superseded by the Local Government (Ireland) Act 1898.

== Etymology ==
Castlerahan barony takes its name from Castlerahan townland, from Castlera[c]han, an ancient hillfort located at 53.824°N 7.188°W. The name is derived from Irish Caisleán Raithín, "stone fort of the little ringfort," although other writers link it with raithean, "bracken", or with a Norse Gael leader named Raithin.

== Geography ==
Castlerahan is located in the southeast of County Cavan, the area surrounding Lough Ramor.

== History ==
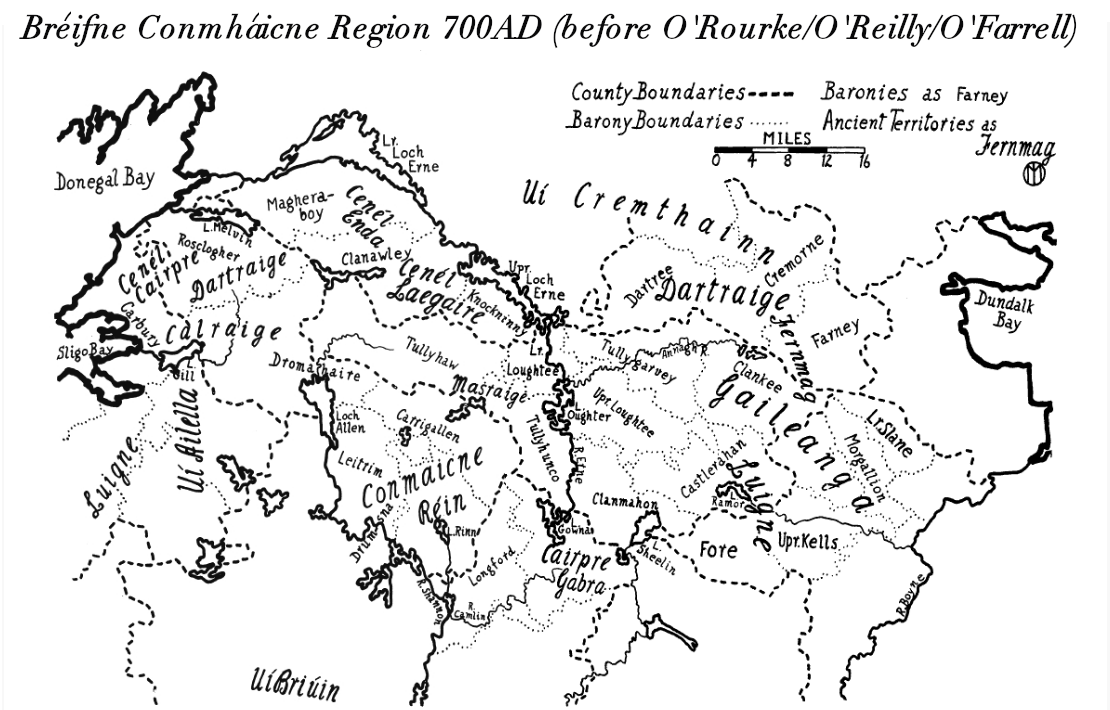
Map of Breifne in AD 700; Castlerahan is seen near to the "Luigne" tribe.

The Luigni tribe lived in the area since the 8th century. It contains the parish of Munterconnaught, named for Cu Connaght Ua Raghallaigh (O'Reilly). The barony of Castlerahan was created by 1609 in the Plantation of Ulster, and was archaically spelled Castlerachan.

The barony gives its name to Castlerahan GAA, based in Ballyjamesduff.

== List of settlements ==
Below is a list of settlements in Castlerahan:

- Ballyjamesduff
- Crosserlough
- Kilnaleck
- Mullagh
- Virginia
