= Contarinia coloradensis =

Scientific classification
- Domain: Eukaryota
- Kingdom: Animalia
- Phylum: Arthropoda
- Class: Insecta
- Order: Diptera
- Family: Cecidomyiidae
- Supertribe: Cecidomyiidi
- Tribe: Cecidomyiini
- Genus: Contarinia
- Species: C. coloradensis

Binomial name
- Contarinia coloradensis Felt, 1912

Species of fly

Contarinia coloradensis is a species of gall midges in the family Cecidomyiidae.
