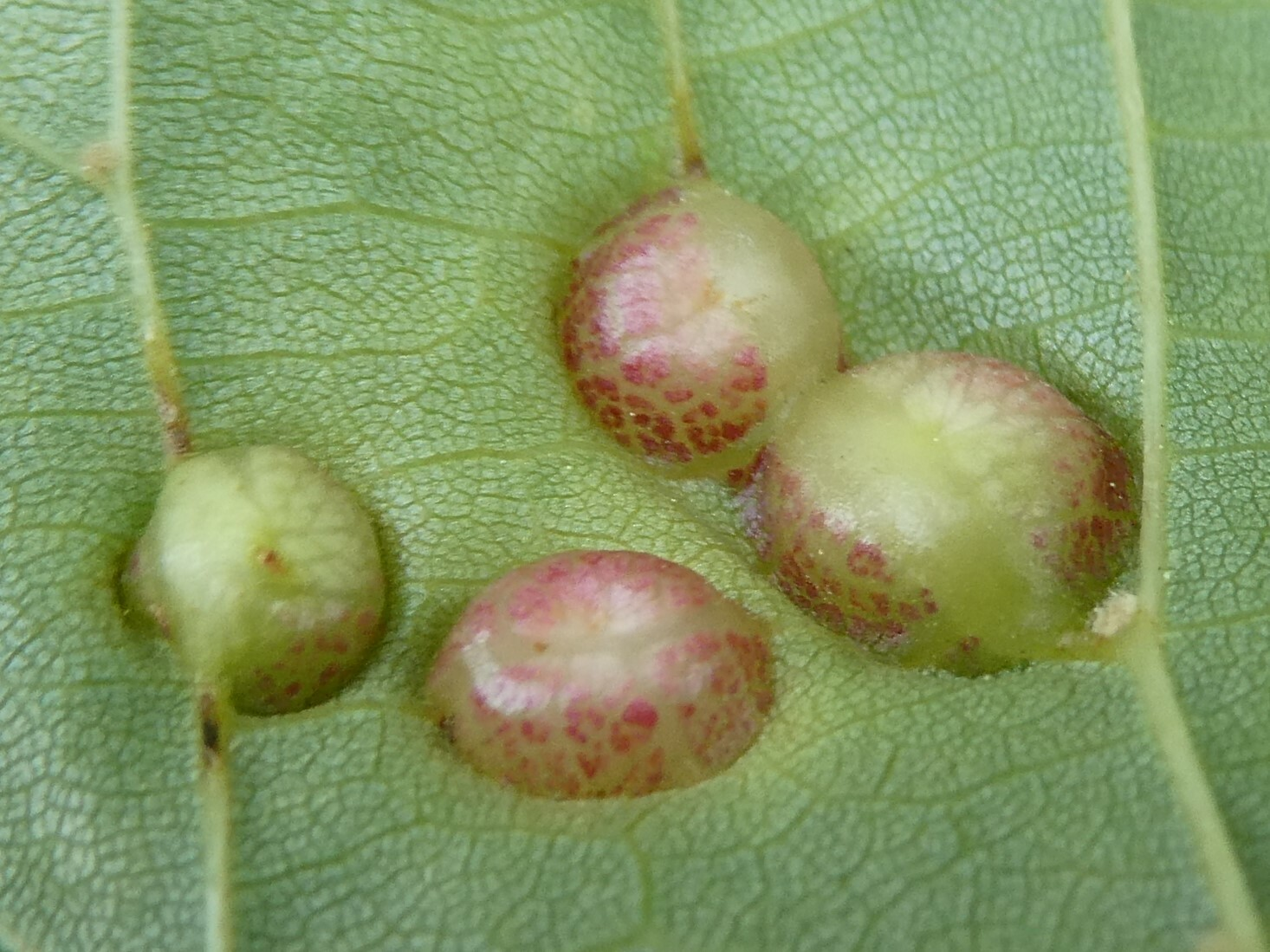
- Leaf galls caused by Contarinia verrucicola

Scientific classification
- Kingdom: Animalia
- Phylum: Arthropoda
- Class: Insecta
- Order: Diptera
- Family: Cecidomyiidae
- Genus: Contarinia
- Species: C. verrucicola

Binomial name
- Contarinia verrucicola (Osten Sacken, 1875)

Synonyms
- Cecidomyia verrucicola Osten Sacken, 1875

= Contarinia verrucicola =

Species of insect

Contarinia verrucicola, known generally as the linden wart gall midge, is a species of gall midges in the family Cecidomyiidae.
