= Munterconnaught =

Parish in County Cavan, Ireland

Munterconnaught Irish: Muintir Connacht
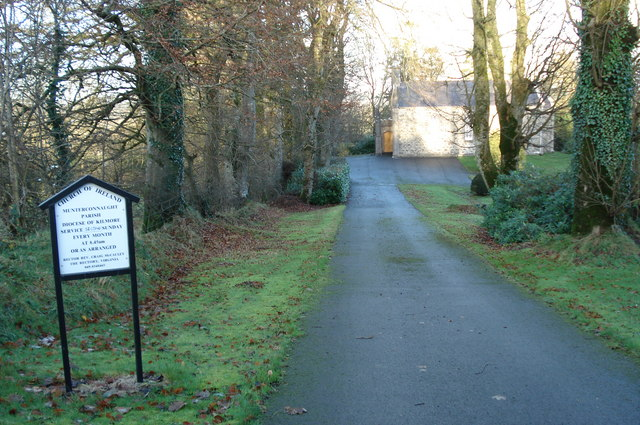
- Parish sign and church in Munterconnaught

- Location of Munterconnaught within the Republic of Ireland
- Coordinates: 53°48′15″N 7°5′23″W
- Country: Ireland
- Province: Ulster
- County: County Cavan
- Irish grid reference: N599842

Munterconnaught (Irish: Muintir Connacht) is a civil and ecclesiastical parish of County Cavan, Ireland. It is located between the southern shores of Lough Ramor and the county boundary with County Meath.

== Etymology ==
The name Munterconnaught has often been mistaken as being derived from the Irish Muintir meaning people and Connacht being the western province. However, it actually has nothing to do with this and is named after Choncur, one of the 13 sons of the O'Reilly's of Breffni. The O'Reilly Clan ruled the area of Cavan and Leitrim which was known as Breffni for centuries.

== Civil parish ==
Munterconnaught consists of drumlin country, lush farmland and lakeshore. It featured in Griffith's Valuation in the 1850s.

Lewis' Topographical Dictionary in 1837 wrote of Munterconnaught

"Munterconnaght a parish, in the barony of Castlerahan, county of Cavan, and province of Ulster, 4 Miles from Oldcastle, on the road from Kells to Ballyjamesduf; containing 2969 inhabitants. This parish is on the confines of the county of Meath, and comprises, according to the Ordnance survey, 7434 statute acres, of which 5828 are applotted under the tithe act, and 965 are in Lough Ramor. It is a rectory and vicarage, in the diocese of Kilmore, forming part of the union of Lurgan: the tithes amount to £148. The church is a very neat building, erected in 1832 by a gift of £900 from the late Board of First Fruits. In the R.C divisions it is part of the union of Castlerahan and Munterconnaught; the chapel is a good stone building. About 140 children are educated in a school aided by subscriptions; and there are three private schools, in which are about 160 children. Here was anciently a hospital, the endowment of which was granted by Jas. I. to Sir Edward Moore."

== Townlands ==
Munterconnaught has a total of 6,450 acres (26.10 km^{2}; 10.08 sq mi) and made up of the following 14 townlands:

- Ballaghdorragh, 325 acres (1.32 km^{2}; 0.51 sq mi)
- Behernagh, 771 acres (3.12 km^{2}; 1.20 sq mi)
- Carrick, 557 acres (2.25 km^{2}; 0.87 sq mi)
- Corronagh, 369 acres (1.49 km^{2}; 0.58 sq mi)
- Croaghan, 442 acres (1.79 km^{2}; 0.69 sq mi)
- Crossafehin, 218 acres (0.88 km^{2}; 0.34 sq mi)
- Eighter, 718 acres (2.91 km^{2}; 1.12 sq mi)
- Island, 369 acres (1.49 km^{2}; 0.58 sq mi)
- Knockaraheen, 316 acres (1.28 km^{2}; 0.49 sq mi)
- Knockatemple, 497 acres (2.01 km^{2}; 0.78 sq mi)
- Knocknagartan, 251 acres (1.02 km^{2}; 0.39 sq mi)
- Knocknaveagh, 422 acres (1.71 km^{2}; 0.66 sq mi)
- Lurganboy, 272 acres (1.10 km^{2}; 0.43 sq mi)
- Ryefield, 923 acres (3.74 km^{2}; 1.44 sq mi)

== Census records ==
Munterconnaught is one of the few locations in Ireland to have early census returns that survive. The destruction of the Public Records Office in the Four Courts in 1922 destroyed all surviving Irish census records from before the 1901 census, and most Church of Ireland records, with rare exceptions. Munterconnaught's census records from 1821 survived the inferno significantly intact along with some other parishes in Cavan.

== Ecclesiastical parishes ==
Church of Ireland parish

Munterconnaught Parish Church, Knockatemple was built in 1831. It is one of the Church of Ireland places of worship in the Virginia Group of Parishes in the Diocese of Kilmore, Elphin and Ardagh. The other churches in the group are Lurgan Parish Church in Virginia (built 1821), Killinkere Parish Church (built 1817), and Billis Church (built 1844). The four churches were amalgamated under one incumbency in 1972.

Roman Catholic parish

The Roman Catholic Parish of Castlerahan and Munterconnaught is one of the parishes in the Diocese of Kilmore. St. Bartholomew's Church, Knockatemple (built 1847) is the Munterconnaught part of the parish, and St. Mary's Church, Castlerahan (built 1834) and St. Joseph's Church, Ballyjamesduff (built 1966) are in the Castlerahan part of the parish.

== Sport ==
Munterconnaught's Gaelic Athletic Association club has won many championships and leagues since its re-affiliation in 1969. The team was originally formed in 1926 but records date the playing of some form of football in Munterconnaught as early as the 1860s.

== People ==
Local celebrities included the singer-songwriter Austin Tighe, and actor Liam Riddley, who had a recurring role as muscles in the television series Glenroe. The journalist and political advisor Jim Duffy is of Munterconnaught descent through his mother, Bernadette Duffy (née Cadden), who was from Munterconnaught. She had been a student in Munterconnaught National School in the 1940s.
