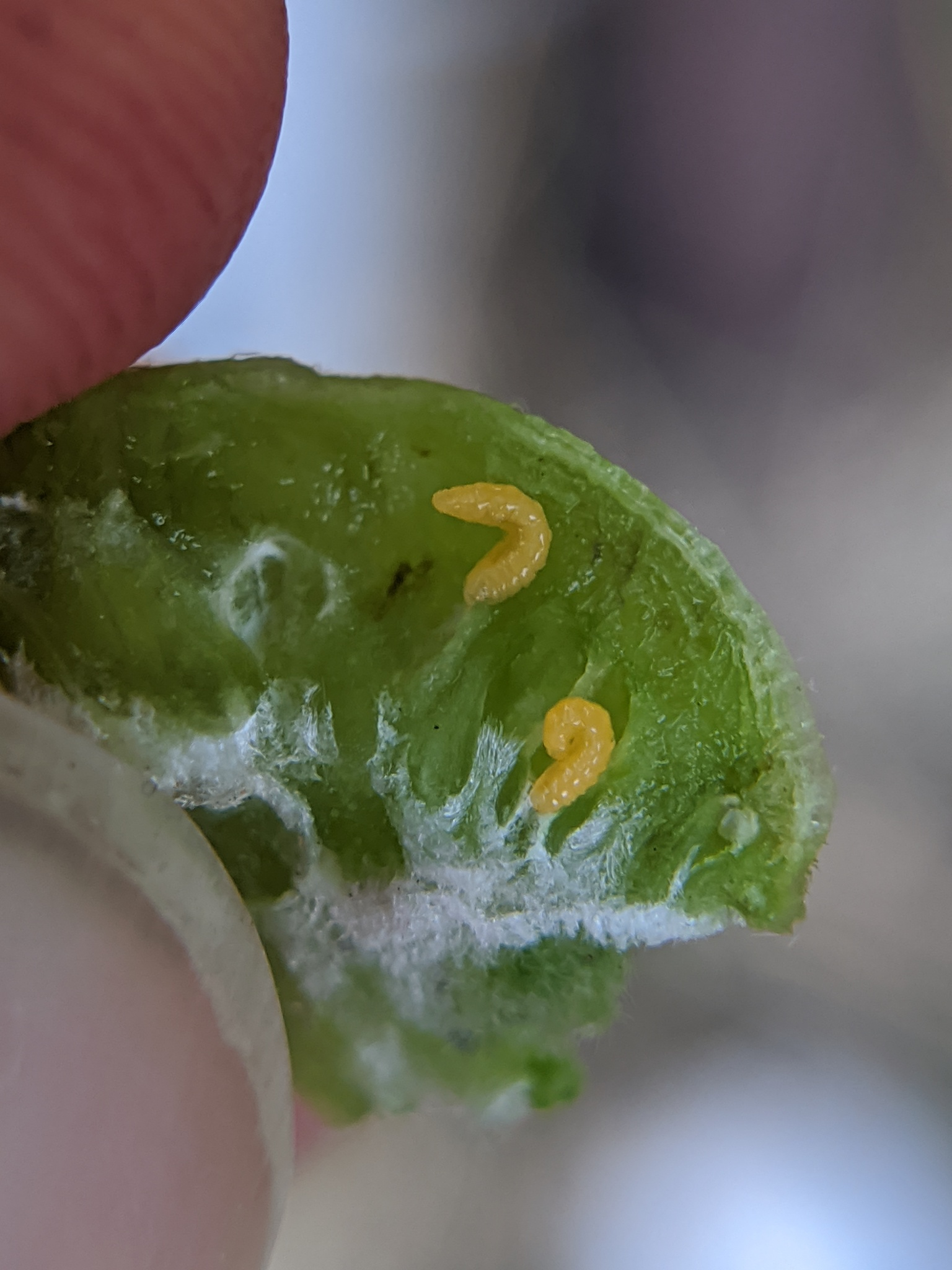
- Larvae on leaf

Scientific classification
- Domain: Eukaryota
- Kingdom: Animalia
- Phylum: Arthropoda
- Class: Insecta
- Order: Diptera
- Family: Cecidomyiidae
- Supertribe: Cecidomyiidi
- Tribe: Cecidomyiini
- Genus: Contarinia
- Species: C. negundinis

Binomial name
- Contarinia negundinis Gillette, 1890

Synonyms
- Cecidomyia negundinis Gillette, 1890; Contarinia negundifolia Felt, 1908

= Contarinia negundinis =

Species of fly

Contarinia negundinis, known generally as boxelder gall midge, is a species of gall midges in the family Cecidomyiidae. Other common names include the boxelder bud gall midge and boxelder leaf gall midge. It is the only North American species that enters diapause during the pupal stage of development.
