= Contarinia citrina =

Scientific classification
- Domain: Eukaryota
- Kingdom: Animalia
- Phylum: Arthropoda
- Class: Insecta
- Order: Diptera
- Family: Cecidomyiidae
- Supertribe: Cecidomyiidi
- Tribe: Cecidomyiini
- Genus: Contarinia
- Species: C. citrina

Binomial name
- Contarinia citrina (Osten Sacken, 1878)

Synonyms
- Cecidomyia citricola Thompson, 1915; Cecidomyia citrina Osten Sacken, 1878

Species of fly

Contarinia citrina is a species of gall midge in the family Cecidomyiidae.
