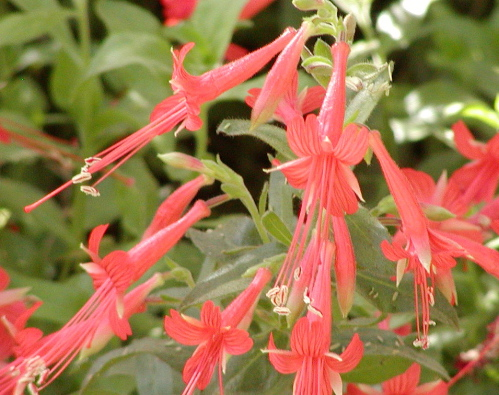
- Zauschneria flowers

Conservation status
- Secure (NatureServe)

Scientific classification
- Kingdom: Plantae
- Clade: Tracheophytes
- Clade: Angiosperms
- Clade: Eudicots
- Clade: Rosids
- Order: Myrtales
- Family: Onagraceae
- Genus: Epilobium
- Species: E. canum

Binomial name
- Epilobium canum (Greene) P.H.Raven

Synonyms
- Zauschneria californica Zauschneria cana

= Epilobium canum =

Species of flowering plant

Epilobium canum, also known as California fuchsia or Zauschneria, is a species of willowherb in the evening primrose family (Onagraceae). It is native to dry slopes and in chaparral of western North America, especially California. It is a perennial plant, notable for the profusion of bright scarlet flowers in late summer and autumn.

The name reflects that in the past it used to be treated in a distinct genus Zauschneria, but modern studies have shown that it is best placed within the genus Epilobium. Other common names include California-fuchsia (from the resemblance of the flowers to those of fuchsias), hummingbird flower or hummingbird trumpet (the flowers are very attractive to hummingbirds), and firechalice.

The original genus name was in honor of Johann Baptista Josef Zauschner (1737–1799), a professor of medicine and botany in Prague.

== Description ==
It is a subshrub growing to 60 centimetres (24 in) tall. Native populations of these plants exhibit considerable variation in appearance and habit. The small leaves may be opposite or alternate, lance-shaped or ovate, with short to nonexistent stalks, and range in color from green to nearly white. Overall shape may be matting or mounding, the plants commonly spreading via rhizomes. The racemes of tubular or funnel-shaped flowers are terminal, and colors are mostly reddish, ranging from fuchsia to pink to red-orange.

The wide degree of variation has led to the description of many subspecies, mostly no longer recognised as distinct due to the extensive intergradation between them; the following are still recognised:

- Epilobium canum subsp. canum (including subsp. angustifolia, subsp. microphylla)
- Epilobium canum subsp. garrettii
- Epilobium canum subsp. latifolium

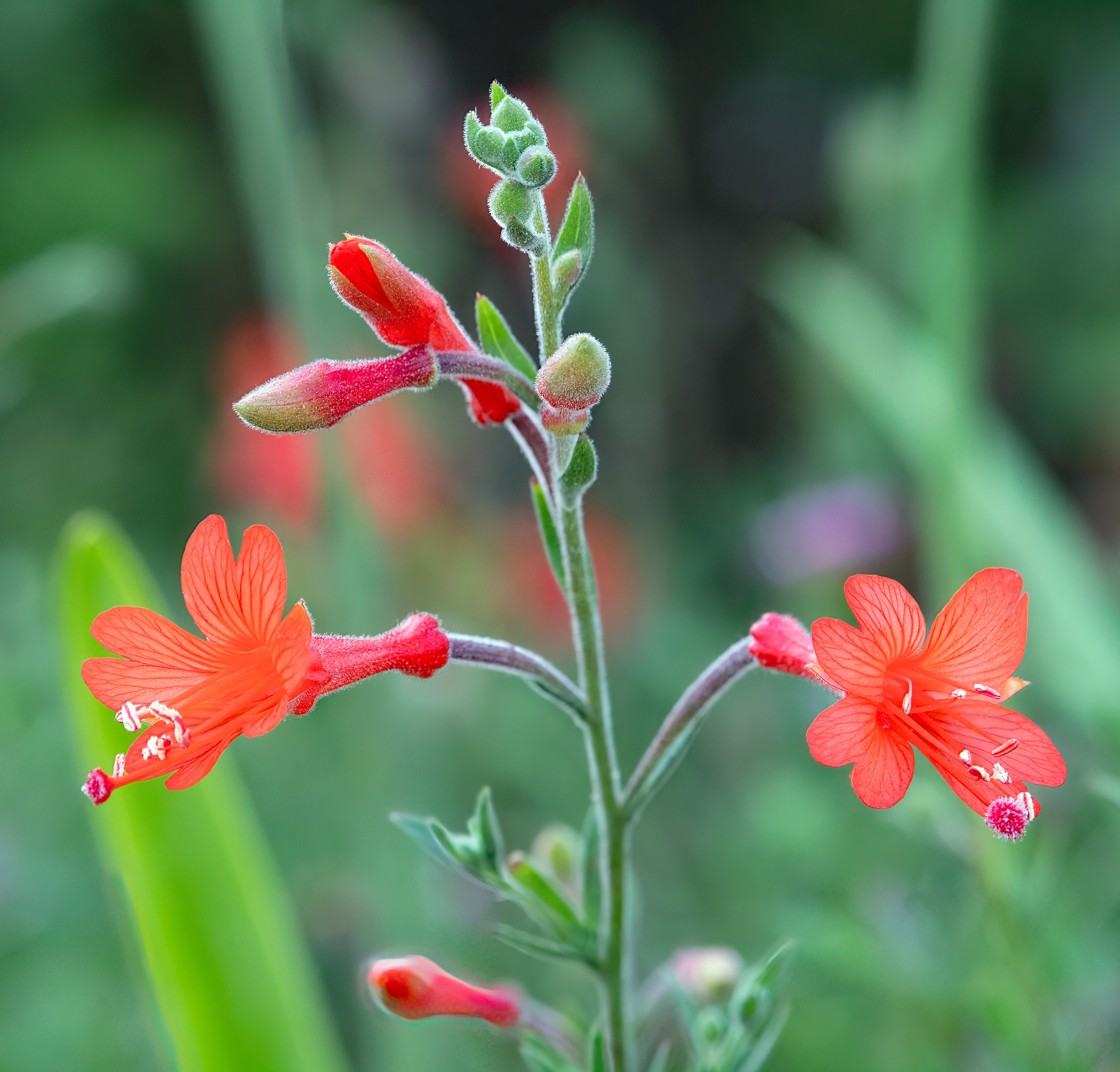
Epilobium canum

== Cultivation ==
As befits their origin, they prefer to be cultivated in well-drained soil exposed to full sun but protected from the wind, and need little watering. Epilobium canum subsp. canum is hardy to USDA zone 8a. Epilobium canum (or its cultivar(s)) is a recipient of the Royal Horticultural Society's Award of Garden Merit under the Zauschneria californica name.

A small number of hybrid cultivars have been introduced by various growers, in some cases by working from isolated populations, such as those on Santa Cruz Island off the California coast.

== See also ==
- California fuchsia gall midge
