= Contarinia cerasiserotinae =

Scientific classification
- Domain: Eukaryota
- Kingdom: Animalia
- Phylum: Arthropoda
- Class: Insecta
- Order: Diptera
- Family: Cecidomyiidae
- Supertribe: Cecidomyiidi
- Tribe: Cecidomyiini
- Genus: Contarinia
- Species: C. cerasiserotinae

Binomial name
- Contarinia cerasiserotinae (Osten Sacken, 1871)

Synonyms
- Cecidomyia cerasiserotinae Osten Sacken, 1871

Species of fly

Contarinia cerasiserotinae is a species of gall midge in the family Cecidomyiidae.
