= Contarinia virginianiae =

Scientific classification
- Kingdom: Animalia
- Phylum: Arthropoda
- Class: Insecta
- Order: Diptera
- Family: Cecidomyiidae
- Supertribe: Cecidomyiidi
- Tribe: Cecidomyiini
- Genus: Contarinia
- Species: C. virginianiae

Binomial name
- Contarinia virginianiae (Felt, 1906)

Synonyms
- Cecidomyia virginianiae Felt, 1906; Contarinia Virginianae

Species of fly

Contarinia virginianiae, known as chokecherry midge or chokecherry gall midge, is a species of gall midges in the family Cecidomyiidae. Its host is the chokecherry Prunus virginiana.

== Description ==
=== Gall ===
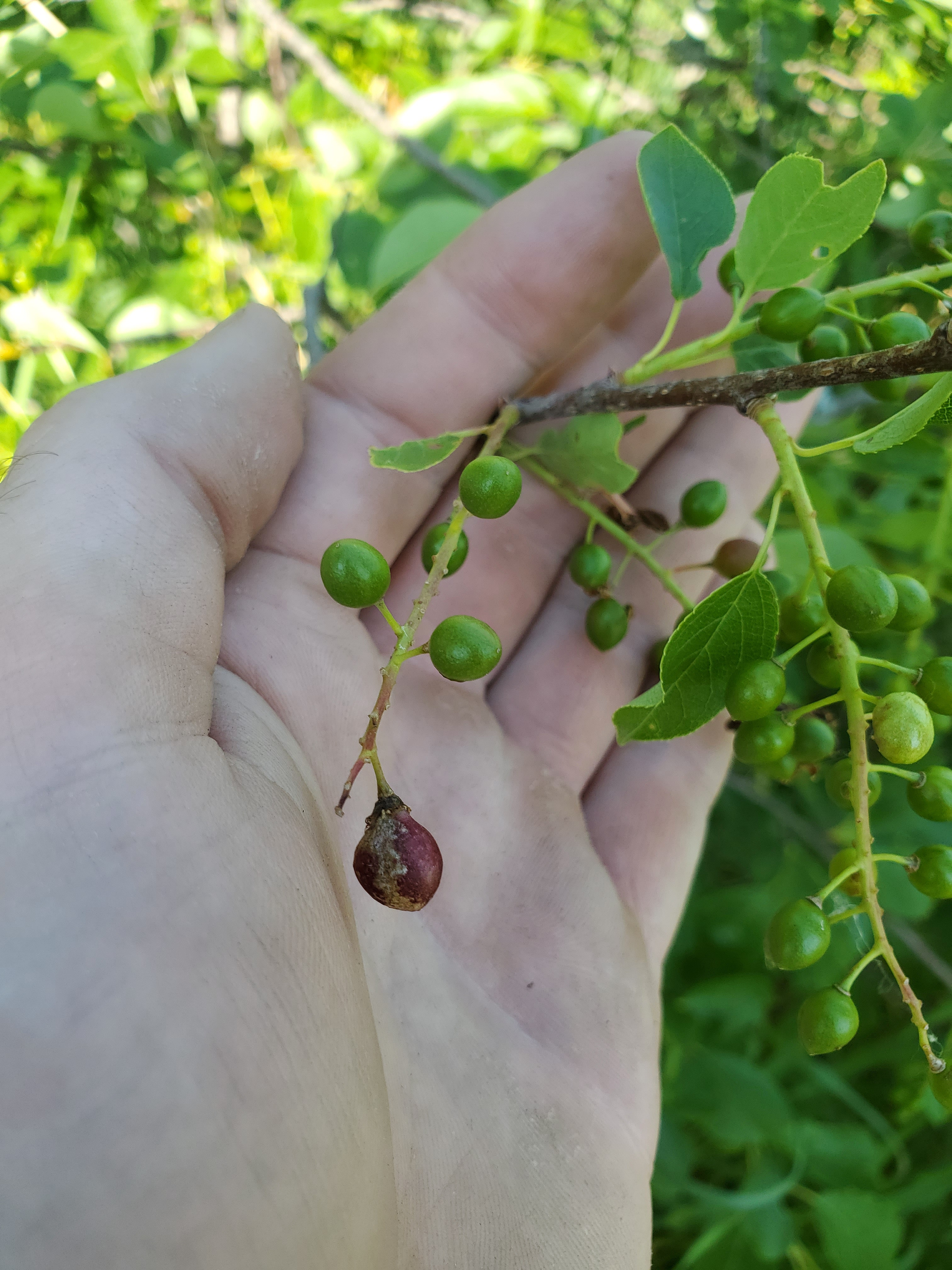
Chokecherry gall midge infected fruit later stage

Tiny yellowish-orange maggots feed on the developing fruit. As feeding continues, the developing fruit becomes enlarged (gall). The gall is the enlarged fruit, which is pear-shaped and hollow. There may be a combination of normal berries and galls on the same fruit cluster. Initially the gall is green in colour but changes to red as it develops. Eventually the seed aborts. Larval feeding continues until late July, when the larvae drops out of the gall to the ground to pupate. The hollow, damaged fruit will often drop off before the berries are ripe.
