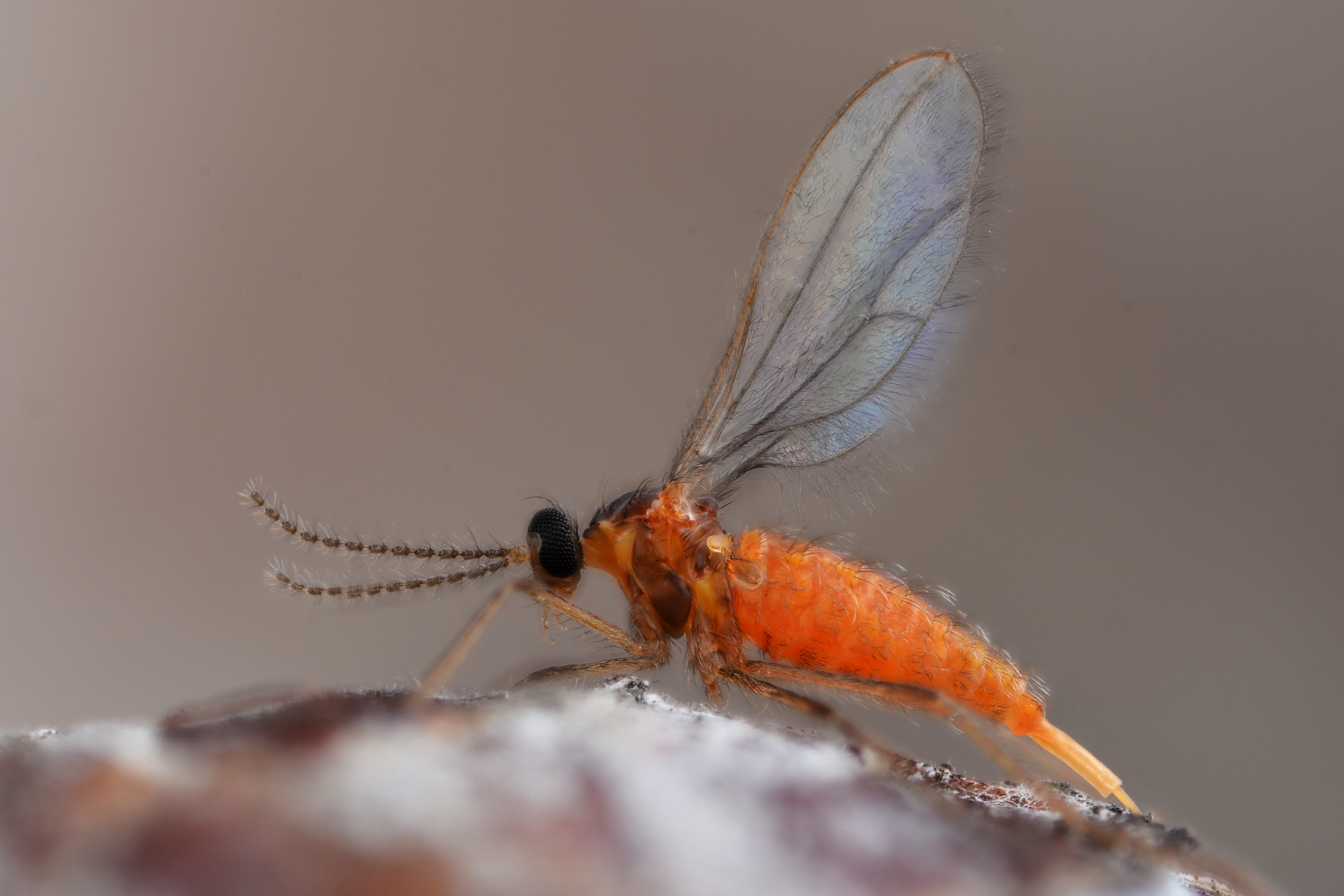
- Contarinia pseudotsugae

Scientific classification
- Kingdom: Animalia
- Phylum: Arthropoda
- Clade: Pancrustacea
- Class: Insecta
- Order: Diptera
- Family: Cecidomyiidae
- Tribe: Cecidomyiini
- Genus: Contarinia; Rondani, 1860

Type species
- Tipula loti De Geer, 1776

Synonyms
- List: Eudiplosis Kieffer, 1894; Stictodiplosis Kieffer, 1894; Contariuia Rübsaamen, 1906; Syndiplosis Rübsaamen, 1910; Atylodiplosis Rübsaamen, 1910; Doxodiplosis Kieffer, 1912; Dryodiplosis Kieffer, 1912; Navasodiplosis Tavares, 1920; Sissudiplosis Mani, 1943; Bothriochloamyia Rao & Sharma, 1977; Contarinomyia Fedotova, 1991; Achillinia Fedotova, 1992

= Contarinia =

Genus of flies

Contarinia is a genus of midges, small flies in the family Cecidomyiidae. There are over 300 described species in the genus.

== Description ==
As cecidomyiids, adult Contarinia are flies with hairy wings and long antennae. Males have antennal flagellomeres equally binodose, with each node surrounded by one circumfilum. The palpi are four-segmented. The tarsal claws of the legs are simple. The wing costal vein is interrupted after its union with the radius or third vein.

The genus was erected by Rondani and commemorates the naturalist Nicolò Bertucci Contarini.

== Ecology ==
Many species of Contarinia have herbivorous larvae that attack inflorescences, fruits, or buds of plants. They include a number of crop pests, such as C. nasturtii (attacks various parts of cruciferous plants), C. citri (attacks flowers of citrus), C. pisi (attacks flower buds of legumes), C. caryafloralis (attacks inflorescences of Chinese hickory) and C. pruniflorum (attacks flower buds of stone fruits).

Two species of Contarinia are the main insects to visit inflorescences of Artocarpus integer (and possibly other plants). They are attracted by "a fruit-like, somewhat unpleasant smell" produced by the inflorescences. The adult midges feed on mycelia of Choanephora fungus (thus they are fungivorous, not herbivorous), which infects the male inflorescences, and females also oviposit in male inflorescences. Midge larvae hatch from the eggs, develop while also feeding on the fungus, pupate and then emerge from male inflorescences. Female inflorescences are not infected by the fungus and so cannot be used by the midges to breed, but they still attract Contarinia midges. The midges are known to carry pollen, so they are believed to pollinate A. integer - a pollination mutualism mediated by a pathogenic fungus.

== Species ==
The following species are recognised in the genus Contarinia:

- Contarinia acerplicans (Kieffer, 1889)
- Contarinia acetosellae (Rübsaamen, 1891)
- Contarinia achilleae Fedotova 1992
- Contarinia aconitifloris Stelter, 1962
- Contarinia acrocecis Stelter, 1962
- Contarinia acuta Gagne, 1984
- Contarinia aequalis Kieffer, 1898
- Contarinia agrimoniae Felt, 1907
- Contarinia ajaguzensis Fedotova, 1995
- Contarinia albotarsa (Felt, 1907)
- Contarinia allii Fedotova 1995
- Contarinia alloteropsidis Harris 1979
- Contarinia amenti (Kieffer, 1909)
- Contarinia ampelophila Felt, 1907
- Contarinia angreni Fedotova, 1993
- Contarinia anthobia (Löw, 1877)
- Contarinia anthonoma (Kieffer, 1890)
- Contarinia anthophthora (Löw, 1880)
- Contarinia aprilina Kieffer, 1901
- Contarinia arrhenatheri Kieffer, 1901
- Contarinia artemisiae Rübsaamen, 1917
- Contarinia asclepiadis Giraud, 1863
- Contarinia asperae Siddiqui, Najam & Deshpande, 2010
- Contarinia asperulae Kieffer, 1909
- Contarinia astragalicarpa Fedotova, 1991
- Contarinia atraphaxiflorae Fedotova, 1988
- Contarinia avenae Kieffer, 1901
- Contarinia baeri (Prell, 1931)
- Contarinia baggendorfi Stelter, 1982
- Contarinia bajankolica Fedotova, 1997
- Contarinia ballotae Kieffer, 1898
- Contarinia balsamifera Felt, 1907
- Contarinia barbichei (Kieffer, 1890)
- Contarinia berulae Fedotova, 1992
- Contarinia beskokotovi Fedotova, 1996
- Contarinia betulicola (Kieffer, 1889)
- Contarinia bitensis (Kieffer, 1909)
- Contarinia bivalviae (Rao, 1952)
- Contarinia bothriochloae Harris, 1979
- Contarinia brassicola Sinclair, 2019
- Contarinia brizae Kieffer, 1896
- Contarinia bulliformis Gagné, 2008
- Contarinia bursariae Kolesik, 1995
- Contarinia calophacae Fedotova 1989
- Contarinia campanulae (Kieffer, 1895)
- Contarinia camphorosmae (Tavares, 1920)
- Contarinia canadensis Felt, 1908
- Contarinia capparis Fedotova, 1983
- Contarinia caraganae (Fedotova, 1990)
- Contarinia caraganicola Marikovskij, 1955
- Contarinia cardariae Fedotova, 1994
- Contarinia carolinae Gagné, 1993
- Contarinia carpini Kieffer, 1897
- Contarinia catalpae (Comstock, 1881)
- Contarinia caryafloralis Jiao, Bu & Kolesik, 2018
- Contarinia caudata Felt, 1920
- Contarinia cerasiserotinae (Osten Sacken, 1871)
- Contarinia cerriperda Skuhravá, 1991
- Contarinia chrysanthemi (Kieffer, 1895)
- Contarinia citri Barnes, 1944
- Contarinia citrina (Osten Sacken, 1878)
- Contarinia clarkei (Felt, 1908)
- Contarinia clematidis Felt, 1908
- Contarinia cockerelli (Felt, 1918)
- Contarinia coffeae Harris, 1970
- Contarinia coloradensis Felt, 1912
- Contarinia constricta Condrashoff, 1961
- Contarinia convallaria Rübsaamen, 1925
- Contarinia convolvulicola Fedotova, 1991
- Contarinia convolvuliflora Fedotova, 1991
- Contarinia coronillae Jane, 1978
- Contarinia coryli (Kaltenbach, 1859)
- Contarinia cotini Kieffer, 1901
- Contarinia craccae (Loew, 1850)
- Contarinia crispans Kieffer, 1909
- Contarinia cucubali Kieffer, 1909
- Contarinia cucumata Gagné, 2008
- Contarinia cuniculator Condrashoff, 1961
- Contarinia cybelae Kieffer, 1909
- Contarinia czalikovae Fedotova, 1996
- Contarinia dactylidis (Loew, 1851)
- Contarinia dalbergiae Mani, 1943
- Contarinia desertophila Fedotova, 1993
- Contarinia desertorum Marikovskij, 1961
- Contarinia dichanthii Harris, 1979
- Contarinia dichanthiumae Siddiqui, Najam & Deshpande, 2010
- Contarinia digitata (Loew, 1850)
- Contarinia dipsacearum Rübsaamen, 1921
- Contarinia divaricata Felt, 1908
- Contarinia echii (Kieffer, 1895)
- Contarinia elaeagniflorae Fedotova, 1988
- Contarinia enceliae (Felt, 1916)
- Contarinia erigeronis Kieffer, 1909
- Contarinia erucastris Fedotova, 1994
- Contarinia excavationis (Felt, 1908)
- Contarinia fagi Rübsaamen, 1921
- Contarinia festucae Jones, 1940
- Contarinia fimbristylidis Harris, 1979
- Contarinia fitchii Felt, 1912
- Contarinia flavolinea Felt, 1908
- Contarinia floricola (Oettingen, 1927)
- Contarinia floriperda Rübsaamen, 1917
- Contarinia florum Rübsaamen, 1917
- Contarinia forskalei Debski, 1918
- Contarinia galatellae Fedotova, 2003
- Contarinia galeobdolontis Kieffer, 1909
- Contarinia galii Kieffer, 1909
- Contarinia gei Kieffer, 1909
- Contarinia gemmae Maia, 2003
- Contarinia geonomae Gagné, 2018
- Contarinia glycyrrhizae Fedotova, 1983
- Contarinia goebeliae Fedotova, 1987
- Contarinia gossypii Felt, 1908
- Contarinia halimodendronis Fedotova, 1991
- Contarinia hedysari Fedotova, 1993
- Contarinia heptapotamica Fedotova, 1991
- Contarinia heraclei (Rübsaamen, 1889)
- Contarinia hongoi Gagné, 1993
- Contarinia hudsonici Felt, 1908
- Contarinia humuli (Theobald, 1909)
- Contarinia hydrangeae Shinji 1939
- Contarinia hyperici Barnes, 1952
- Contarinia hypochoeridis (Rübsaamen, 1891)
- Contarinia ilicis Kieffer, 1898
- Contarinia inouyei Mani, 1954
- Contarinia inquilina Rübsaamen, 1917
- Contarinia intrans Harris, 1979
- Contarinia inulicola Stelter, 1965
- Contarinia ishkovi Fedotova, 1997
- Contarinia istriana Janežič, 1980
- Contarinia jaapi Rübsaamen, 1914
- Contarinia jacobaeae (Loew, 1850)
- Contarinia johnsoni Felt, 1909
- Contarinia jongi Kolesik, 2017
- Contarinia juniperina Felt, 1939
- Contarinia juniperiramea Fedotova, 1985
- Contarinia kanervoi Barnes, 1958
- Contarinia karataliensis Fedotova, 1994
- Contarinia karatavica Fedotova, 1994
- Contarinia kiefferi (Schlechtendahl, 1891)
- Contarinia kochiae Fedotova, 1998
- Contarinia kurenzovi Kovalev, 1972
- Contarinia lamii Kieffer, 1909
- Contarinia lamiicola Rübsaamen, 1915
- Contarinia lathyri Kieffer, 1909
- Contarinia lentis Aczel
- Contarinia lepidii Kieffer, 1909
- Contarinia lespedezifolia Kovalev, 1972
- Contarinia liliacea Wahlgren, 1957
- Contarinia lilii Kieffer, 1909
- Contarinia limonii Fedotova, 1992
- Contarinia lini Simova & Skuhravá, 2007
- Contarinia lolii Metcalfe, 1933
- Contarinia lonicerae Kieffer, 1909
- Contarinia lonicerearum (Löw, 1877)
- Contarinia loti (De Geer, 1776)
- Contarinia luteola Tavares, 1902
- Contarinia lycii Debski, 1918
- Contarinia lyciicola Fedotova, 1983
- Contarinia lycopersici Felt, 1911
- Contarinia lysimachiae (Rübsaamen, 1893)
- Contarinia maculipennis Felt, 1933
- Contarinia maculosa Felt, 1908
- Contarinia majanthemi (Rübsaamen, 1925)
- Contarinia mali Barnes, 1939
- Contarinia manii Harris, 2010
- Contarinia marchali Kieffer, 1896
- Contarinia martagonis Kieffer, 1909
- Contarinia matusintome Haraguti & Monzen, 1955
- Contarinia medicaginis Kieffer, 1895
- Contarinia melaleucae Kolesik, 2017
- Contarinia melanocera Kieffer, 1904
- Contarinia melissitis Fedotova, 1992
- Contarinia merceri Barnes, 1930
- Contarinia meristotropea Fedotova, 1993
- Contarinia minima Kieffer, 1909
- Contarinia molluginis Rübsaamen, 1889
- Contarinia montana Fedotova, 1993
- Contarinia morindae Grover, 1966
- Contarinia moringae Mani, 1936
- Contarinia mucidus Fedotova, 1993
- Contarinia nasturtii (Kieffer, 1888) – swede midge
- Contarinia negundinis (Gillette, 1890)
- Contarinia nicolayi Fedotova, 1997
- Contarinia nitensis Fedotova, 1997
- Contarinia nitrariae Fedotova, 1988
- Contarinia nitrariagemmae Fedotova, 1988
- Contarinia nubilipennis (Kieffer, 1889)
- Contarinia obesa Felt, 1918
- Contarinia okadai (Miyoshi, 1926)
- Contarinia onobrychidis Kieffer, 1895
- Contarinia ononidis Kieffer, 1899
- Contarinia opuntiae (Felt, 1910)
- Contarinia oregonensis Foote, 1956
- Contarinia orientalis (Rao & Sharma, 1977)
- Contarinia ovipositosclera Fedotova, 1993
- Contarinia oxytropeocarpi Fedotova, 1993
- Contarinia oxytropiflora Fedotova, 1984
- Contarinia partheniicola (Cockerell, 1900)
- Contarinia passlowi Harris, 1979
- Contarinia pastinacae (Rübsaamen, 1892)
- Contarinia pentaphylloidifolia Fedotova 1990
- Contarinia perfoliata Felt, 1908
- Contarinia peritomatis (Cockerell, 1913)
- Contarinia perplicata Fedotova, 1997
- Contarinia petioli (Kieffer, 1898)
- Contarinia phellodendrobia Kovalev, 1972
- Contarinia phytolaccae Plakidas, 2016
- Contarinia picridis (Kieffer, 1894)
- Contarinia pilosellae Kieffer, 1896
- Contarinia pimpinellae Tavares, 1902
- Contarinia piri Tavares, 1922
- Contarinia pisi (Loew, 1850) – pea midge
- Contarinia plicata Gagné, 1993
- Contarinia plumosi Harris, 1979
- Contarinia polygonati Rübsaamen, 1921
- Contarinia populi (Rübsaamen, 1917)
- Contarinia pratula Fedotova, 1993
- Contarinia pravdini Becknazarova & Mamaeva, 1981
- Contarinia prolixa Gagné & Byers, 1985
- Contarinia prosopidis (Mani, 1938)
- Contarinia pruniflorum Coutin & Rambier, 1955
- Contarinia psammophila Marikovskij, 1975
- Contarinia pseudotsugae Condrashoff, 1961
- Contarinia pulcherrima Kieffer, 1909
- Contarinia pulchripes (Kieffer, 1890)
- Contarinia pyrivora (Riley, 1886)
- Contarinia quercicola (Rübsaamen, 1899)
- Contarinia quercina (Rübsaamen, 1890)
- Contarinia quinquenotata (Löw, 1888) – daylily gall midge
- Contarinia racemi (Stebbins, 1910)
- Contarinia ramachandrani (Mani, 1953)
- Contarinia ramicola (Rudow, 1875)
- Contarinia reaumuriae Fedotova, 1991
- Contarinia rhamni Rübsaamen, 1892
- Contarinia ribis Kieffer, 1909
- Contarinia roperi Harris, 1979
- Contarinia rosaecarpae Fedotova, 1992
- Contarinia rubicola Kieffer, 1909
- Contarinia rubsaameni (Kieffer, 1894)
- Contarinia rudbeckiae Plakidas, 2016
- Contarinia rumicina (Tavares, 1919)
- Contarinia rumicis (Loew, 1850)
- Contarinia salatica Fedotova, 1996
- Contarinia salicola Shinji, 1939
- Contarinia sambuci (Kaltenbach, 1873)
- Contarinia sambucifoliae Felt, 1907
- Contarinia saussureaflora Fedotova, 1996
- Contarinia scabiosae Kieffer, 1898
- Contarinia schlechtendaliana (Rübsaamen, 1893)
- Contarinia schulzi Gagné, 1972
- Contarinia scirpi Harris, 1979
- Contarinia scoparii (Rübsaamen, 1889)
- Contarinia scrophulariae Kieffer, 1896
- Contarinia scutati Rübsaamen, 1910
- Contarinia sehimae Harris, 1979
- Contarinia selevini Fedotova, 1984
- Contarinia sennicola Kolesik, 2000
- Contarinia sesami Grover & Bakhshi, 1978
- Contarinia setigera (Lintner, 1897)
- Contarinia shelahovi Kolomoets, 1986
- Contarinia shevtshenkoi Fedotova, 1991
- Contarinia silenei Tavares, 1916
- Contarinia silvestris Kieffer, 1897
- Contarinia solani (Rübsaamen, 1892)
- Contarinia soongarica Fedotova, 1994
- Contarinia sorbariaflora Fedotova, 2004
- Contarinia sorbi (Kieffer, 1894)
- Contarinia sphaerophysae Fedotova, 1984
- Contarinia spiraeaphaga Fedotova, 1988
- Contarinia spiraeina Felt, 1911
- Contarinia squamulicola (Stebbins, 1910)
- Contarinia stackelbergi Kovalev 1972
- Contarinia steini (Karsch, 1881)
- Contarinia subulifex Kieffer, 1897
- Contarinia symphyti Kieffer, 1909
- Contarinia tanaceti Rübsaamen, 1921
- Contarinia tecomae (Felt, 1906)
- Contarinia tephrosiae (Mani, 1944)
- Contarinia texana (Felt, 1921)
- Contarinia thalactri (Felt, 1907)
- Contarinia thermopsidis s Fedotova, 1993
- Contarinia thlaspeos Rübsaamen, 1910
- Contarinia tianschanica Fedotova, 1997
- Contarinia tiliarum (Kieffer, 1890)
- Contarinia tragopogonis Kieffer, 1909
- Contarinia tremulae Kieffer, 1909
- Contarinia trifolii Felt, 1907
- Contarinia tritici (Kirby, 1798) – wheat fly
- Contarinia trizni Fedotova, 1996
- Contarinia trotteri Kieffer, 1909
- Contarinia truncata Felt, 1908
- Contarinia turkmenica Becknazarova & Mamaeva, 1981
- Contarinia ubiquita Gagné 2001
- Contarinia umbellatarum Rübsaamen, 1910
- Contarinia utechini Fedotova, 1996
- Contarinia valerianae (Rübsaamen, 1890)
- Contarinia variabilis Rübsaamen, 1917
- Contarinia vera Fedotova, 1997
- Contarinia verna (Curtis, 1827)
- Contarinia vernalis (Felt, 1908)
- Contarinia veronicastum Fedotova, 2003
- Contarinia verrucicola (Osten Sacken, 1875)
- Contarinia viatica Felt, 1908
- Contarinia viburnorum Kieffer, 1913
- Contarinia viciocarpi Fedotova, 1993
- Contarinia vincetoxici Kieffer, 1909
- Contarinia virginianiae (Felt, 1906)
- Contarinia viridiflava Felt, 1908
- Contarinia virosa Fedotova, 1996
- Contarinia viticola Rübsaamen, 1906
- Contarinia washingtonensis Johnson, 1963
- Contarinia zauschneriae (Felt, 1912)
- Contarinia ziziphorae Fedotova, 1998
- Contarinia zygophylli Debski, 1918
- Contarinia zygophylliflorae Fedotova, 1990
