= Munterconnaught GAA =

GAA club in Munterconnaught, County Cavan, Ireland

Munterconnaught
- Muintir Chú Chonnacht
- Founded: 1926
- County: Cavan
- Nickname: The Munchies
- Colours
- Grounds: St Bartolomew’s Park

Playing kits
Standard colours

Senior Club Championships
	All Ireland	Ulster champions	Cavan champions
Football:	0	0	0

Munterconnaught GFC is a Gaelic Athletic Association club in Munterconnaught, County Cavan, Ireland. The club is affiliated to the Cavan County Board and is exclusively concerned with the game of Gaelic football. Munterconnaught GFC currently compete in the Cavan Junior Football Championship and the Division 3 Football League.

== History ==
Located in the parish of Munterconnaught, on the Cavan–Meath border, Munterconnaught GAA Club was founded in 1926, however, records show that Gaelic football had been played in the area since the 1860s. The club was still in its infancy when, in 1928, the Cavan JFC title was won for the first time. Munterconnaught claimed a second Cavan JFC title in 1949 before being beaten by Bailieborough Shamrocks in the 1952 Cavan SFC final. High rates of emigration in the 1950s resulted in the club becoming dormant for a period.

Munterconnaught GAA Club reorganised in 1969. Seven years later in 1976 the club claimed a third Cavan JFC title, while a senior amalgamation with Castlerahan, known as St Mary's, also won the Cavan SFC title that year. The club beat Cuchulainns by three points to claim the Cavan IFC title in 1980 and senior status.

The club eventually slipped down to the junior grade once again and won a fourth Cavan JFC title in 1994. An underage amalgamation with the Ramor United club yielded three consecutive Cavan U21 FC titles between 2008 and 2010. Munterconnaught won its fifth Cavan JFC title after a 0–11 to 0–10 defeat of Kill Shamrocks in 2025.. Later that year, the club went on to defeat Denn GAA in the delayed Division 3 League Final, crowning them both league and championship winners of 2025.

== Honours ==
- Cavan Senior Football Championship (1): 1976 (as St Marys)
- Cavan Intermediate Football Championship (1): 1980
- Cavan Junior Football Championship (5): 1928, 1949, 1976, 1994, 2025
- Cavan Under-21 Football Championship (3): 2008, 2009, 2010 (as Ramor–Munterconnaught)
- Cavan Division 3 League (1): 2005, 2025

== Notable players ==
- Séamus Hetherton: All-Ireland SFC–winner (1952)
