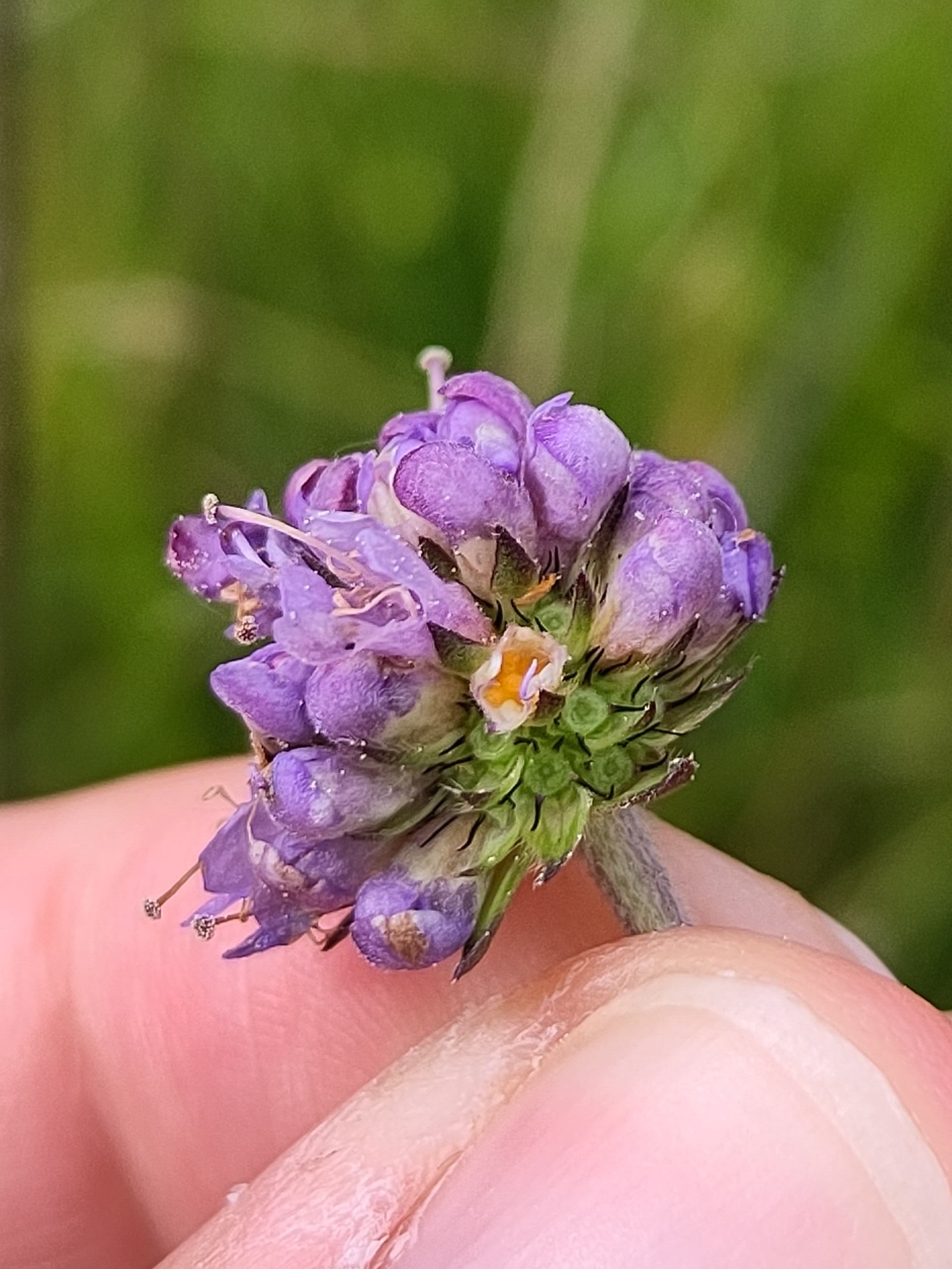
- Larvae of Contarinia dipsacearum in a galled flowerhead of Succisa pratensis.

Scientific classification
- Kingdom: Animalia
- Phylum: Arthropoda
- Class: Insecta
- Order: Diptera
- Family: Cecidomyiidae
- Genus: Contarinia
- Species: C. dipsacearum

Binomial name
- Contarinia dipsacearum Rübsaamen, 1921

= Contarinia dipsacearum =

Species of fly

Contarinia dipsacearum is a gall midge. The larvae develop in and feed on galled flowers of Succisa pratensis and Knautia arvensis. They pupate in the soil.
