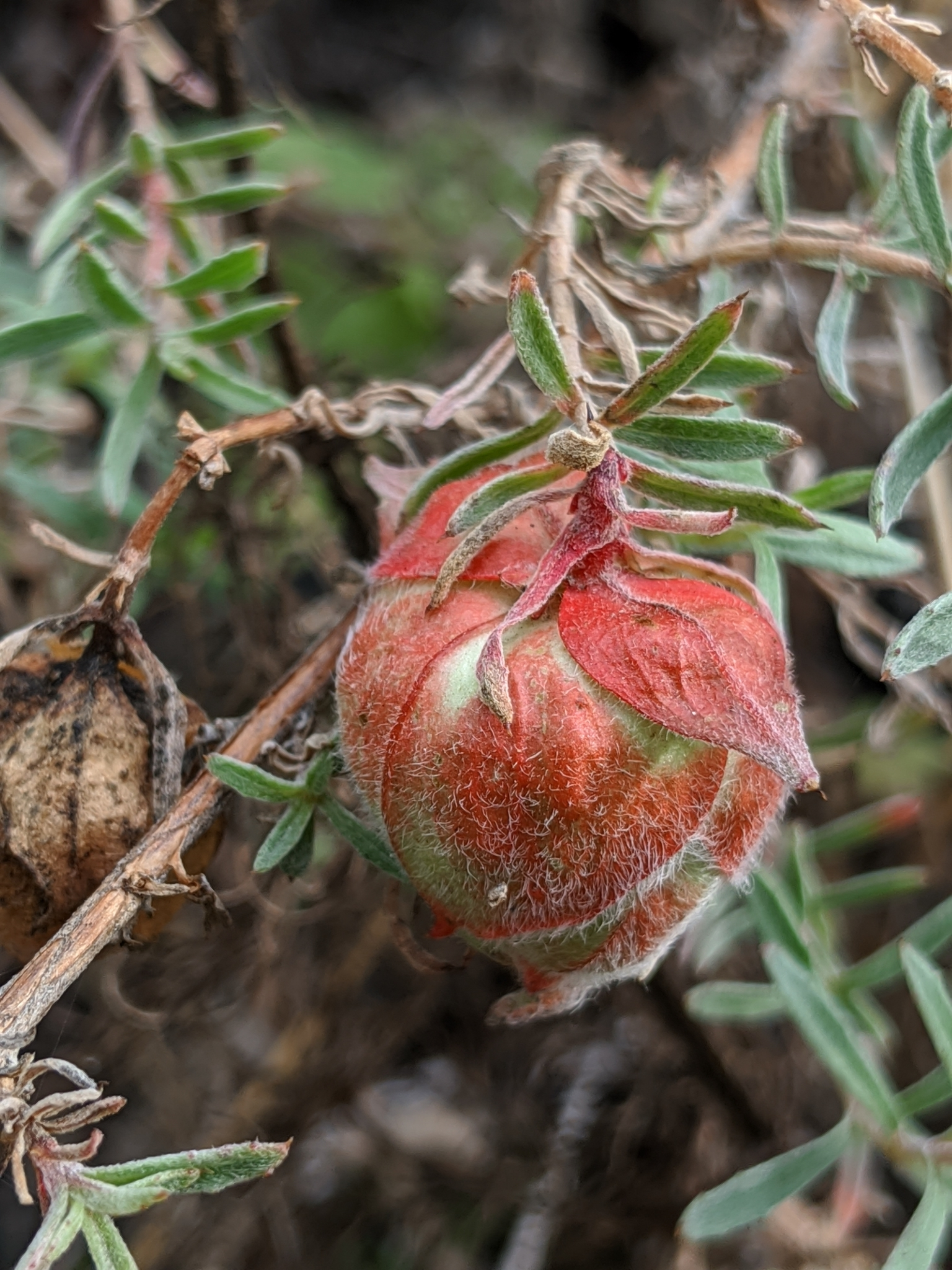

Scientific classification
- Kingdom: Animalia
- Phylum: Arthropoda
- Class: Insecta
- Order: Diptera
- Family: Cecidomyiidae
- Supertribe: Cecidomyiidi
- Tribe: Cecidomyiini
- Genus: Contarinia
- Species: C. zauschneriae

Binomial name
- Contarinia zauschneriae (Felt, 1912)

Synonyms
- Thecodiplosis zauschneriae

= Contarinia zauschneriae =

North American gall-inducing insect

Contarinia zauschneriae, also known as the California fuchsia gall midge, is a species of gall midge that induces roselle-form bud galls on Epilobium canum, a flowering plant of western North America. The galls are typically 25 millimeters high and about 15 millimeters around. The coloration roughly mimics that of a stereotypical red rosebud, with red on the upper half where the petals would be and green-yellow at the base where the leaflets would be. The type species was collected by Ephraim Felt in the Puente Hills, near Whittier, California, in 1910.
