= Dairy cattle evaluation =

Systems for rating dairy cattle

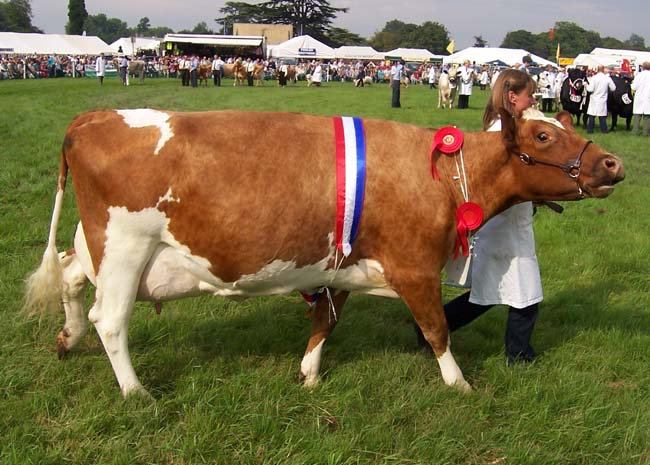
A prize winning Ayrshire cow.

Dairy cattle evaluation is the process of placing a group of dairy cows in order from most to least desirable based on milk production and longevity, where each animal is compared against the "ideal" animal. Dairy cattle are evaluated based on physical traits that equate to high milk production, with slight variations between different breeds. Dairy cattle evaluation is primarily used by producers to select the best cows to keep in the herd.

== Evaluation by country ==
=== United States ===
In the U.S., the standard for dairy cattle evaluation is provided by the Dairy Cow Unified Scorecard, created by the Purebred Dairy Cattle Association. (PDCA) This system of evaluation is the industry standard, and is advised by the Holstein Foundation, Holstein UK, the FFA and 4-H Organizations, and the World Dairy Expo. There are nationwide dairy cattle evaluation contests held by groups such as the National FFA Organization and 4-H, as well as at large dairy shows like the World Dairy Expo and the All-American Dairy show. These contests attract a wide range of evaluators, from high school to post-secondary education age. These contests generally place cows in groups of four, called classes. Each class is made up of cows of the same age and breed. The 7 breeds recognized by the PDCA are: Ayrshire, Brown Swiss, Guernsey, Red and White, Holstein, Jersey, and Milking Shorthorn. The major points considered when evaluating dairy cows are divided into 4 major categories: Frame, Dairy Strength, Rear Feet and Legs, and Udder. Each of the four categories is additionally subdivided into specific traits, and given a specific weight when evaluating dairy cattle. Although judgers reference the scorecard when evaluating cattle, the memorization of the weights of each trait gives them a way to determine the most desirable cow.

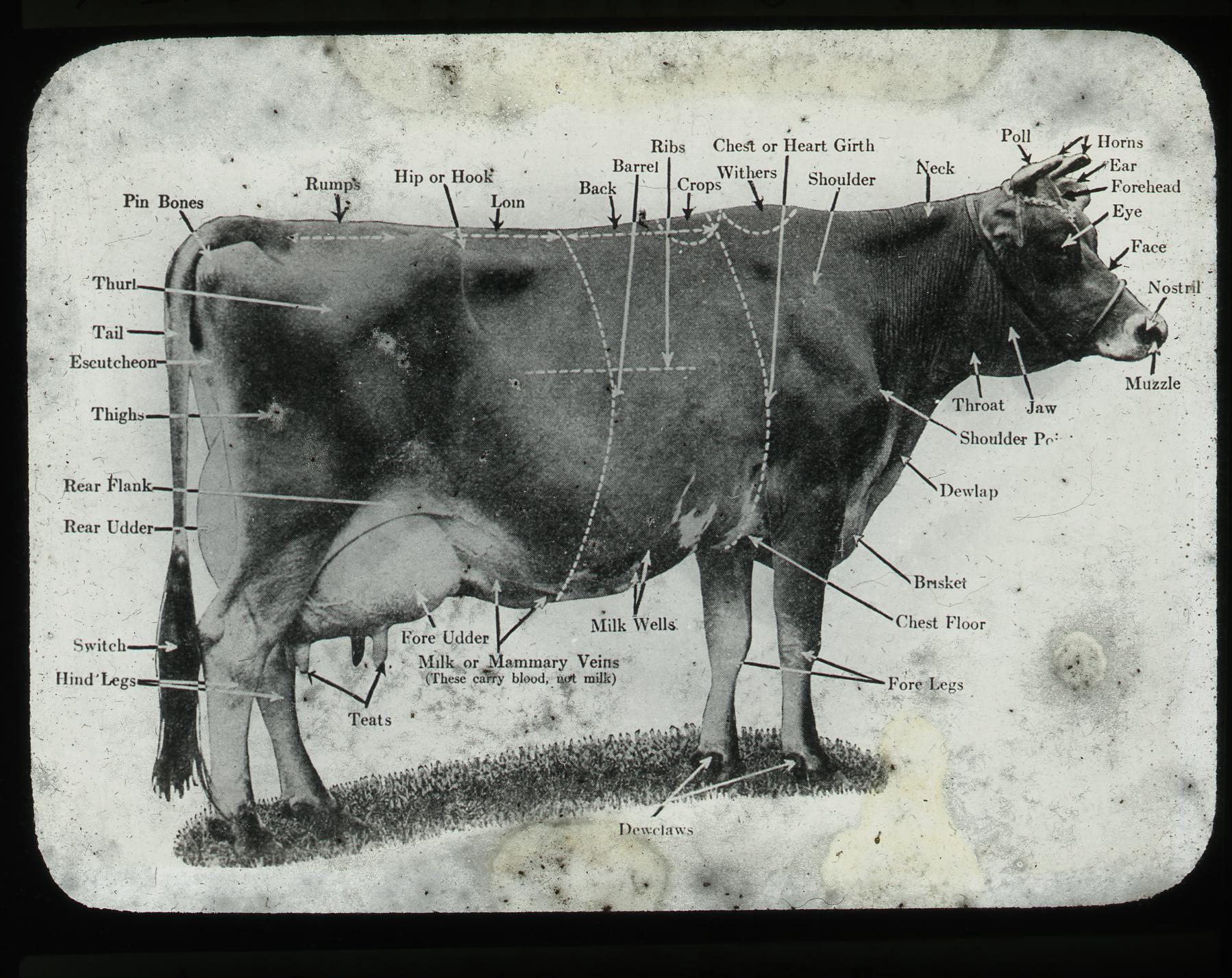
A dairy cow with significant features labeled

==== Udder - 40% ====
Because the primary product of a dairy cow is milk, the udder traits are most heavily weighted. Udder depth is the most important trait of the udder. It is assigned a maximum of 10 points. The udder should not be carried too high nor too low. The floor of the udder should be carried at a depth near the hock of the animal. The appropriate depth of the udder helps to prevent mastitis, but also ensures that the animal can carry the most milk. Udder depth is related to the number of lactations of a cow, and this is taken into consideration. The rear udder is given 9 points. It should be attached high and wide, and continue this width until the udder floor. Teat placement is given 5 points. Teats should be spaced evenly and square with each quarter. Ideal teat position is perfectly vertical. The udder cleft is assigned 5 points. The rear suspensory ligament should be clearly visible and the rear udder should be split evenly into two halves. The fore udder is given 5 points and should be attached so that it blends smoothly into stomach of the animal. A rounded fore udder indicates a loose attachment. Teats are given 3 points and should be of moderate length and width. Cylindrical teats are desirable. Udder Balance is given 3 points. The udder should have a pleasing appearance. It should be level in the fore udder and balanced evenly between fore and rear udder.

==== Dairy strength - 25% ====
Dairy strength is defined as a combination of dairyness and strength. Dairyness is the appearance of angularity, and can be visible in several places, such as over the withers. The ribs are given 8 points and should be visible and flat appearing, with ample space between each rib. They should also show adequate spring of rib, which is the width that the ribs extend from the animal's body. The chest is given 6 points and should be "deep and wide". The barrel should be long, deep, and wide and is given 4 points. The thighs are given 2 points and should be wide and flat. They should appear lean and concave. The neck, given 2 points, should be free of excess skin and fat, appearing long and attached smoothly to the body. The withers are given 2 points and should be well defined and angular. The skin should be "thin, loose, and pliable" and is given 1 point.

==== Rear feet and legs - 20% ====
Rear feet and legs are given 20% of the overall preference of a dairy cow. Movement of the animal is given 5 points. The animal should travel smoothly. The rear feet should almost replace the front in a normal stride length. From a side view, the animal should have a moderate hock set. This trait is given 3 points. From a rear view, the rear feet should be wide spread and square. This is given 3 points. The Dairy Cow Unified Scorecard states that rear feet should also have "steep angle and deep heel with short, well-rounded closed toes" and gives this trait a value of 3 points The thurl is given 2 points and should be centrally located between the hips and pins. The hocks set is given 2 points and should be moderate, not angled too straight, also called post-legged, nor too angled, which is known as sickle-hocked. The bones are given 1 point and should be visible and flat appearing. Pasterns are given 1 point and should be strong but flexible, with a moderate angle to the ground.

==== Frame - 15% ====
Frame is given the lowest level of importance on the Dairy Cow Unified Scorecard. The highest value assigned under frame is given to the rump trait at 5 points. The PDCA says that the rump should "be long and wide throughout. Pin bones should be slightly lower than hip bones with adequate width between the pins. Thurls should be wide apart. Vulva should be nearly vertical and the anus should not be recessed. Tail head should set slightly above and neatly between pin bones with freedom from coarseness." The front end is given 5 and should be smooth across the shoulder, with good spacing between the front legs. The back is given 2 points and should be strong, straight, and level. Stature is given 2 points. A cow should be proportionally correct in terms of stature. The leg bones should be long, and the stature should be consistent with other animals of the same breed and age.

==== Other factors ====
There are several other factors that do not fall into the four categories that are also taken into account. These traits are ranked in severity from no discrimination to disqualification of the animal from a contest. These are also given on the Dairy Cow Unified Scorecard.

No Discrimination	Slight Discrimination	Slight to Serious Discrimination	Serious Discrimination	Disqualification
Presence of horns	Blindness in one eye	Evidence of blindness	Overconditioning	Total Blindness
Capped hip	Cross or bulging eyes	Wry face	Evidence of crampy hind legs	Permanent Lameness
	Cropped ears	Parrot jaw	Udder attachment separation	Blind Quarter
	Temporary lameness	Winged shoulders		Freemartin Heifer
	Fluid in hocks	Tail abnormalities		Tampering of animal
	Toe out	Weak pastern		
	Side leak	Lack of strong rear suspensory ligament		
	Abnormal milk	Weak udder attachment		
		Light quarters, udder abnormalities		
		Lack of frame size		
		Minor or temporary injuries		

==== Breed distinctions ====
Certain breeds are evaluated with a slight deviation from the standard scorecard. These variations are due to the slight differences between breeds, and often reflect what aspects of each breed are considered most important. Such variations include that the Guernsey breed of cattle is not discriminated based on size, and both fore and rear udder are worth 7 points each when evaluating Holstein cows.

=== Canada ===
In Canada, each breed is compared to a different breed conformation chart. The traits are split into 4 sections: Rump, Mammary System, Dairy Strength, and Feet and Legs. Each of the traits that falls under these categories is assigned a percentage of the total component. The weight of each of the four major categories by breed all place the highest value on mammary system, with value percentages ranging from 40 to 48 percent. From there, each breed assigns different values to each group of characteristics based on the breed association's preferences.

=== New Zealand ===
New Zealand uses a system of evaluation called Traits other than Production. This linear classification system uses the numbers one through nine to rank individual traits. There are 18 traits that are evaluated. Four are evaluated by the producer, and the other fourteen are evaluated by a certified herd inspector. The four traits evaluated by the producer are adaptability to milk, shed temperament, milking speed, and overall opinion.

The other fourteen traits evaluated by the inspector are weight, stature, capacity, rump angle, rump width, legs, udder support, front udder, rear udder, front teat placement, rear teat placement, udder overall, dairy conformation, and condition score

After each of these traits is evaluated, the animal is assigned an award based on its score. There are four classifications. In order from most to least desirable, they are: Excellent, Very Good, Good Plus, and Good.

=== UK ===
The UK uses a system of evaluation called Type Classification Scoring, or TCS. This system is a linear based system that uses the values one through nine to rank a cows trait based on its degree of extreme. From the result of this value, the cow is given a classification. The traits ranked by TCS are stature, body depth, rump width, rump angle, angularity, chest width, rear leg set, foot angle, rear leg, rear view, locomotion, bone quality, fore udder attachment, rear udder width, udder support, rear udder height, udder depth, udder texture, rear teat placement, front teat placement, teat length, and teat positions.

The classifications are broken up according to score. They are:

- 90-100: Excellent (EX)
- 85-89: Very Good (VG)
- 80-84: Good Plus (GP)
- 75-79: Good (G)
- 65-74: Fair (F)
- 50-64: Poor (P)
