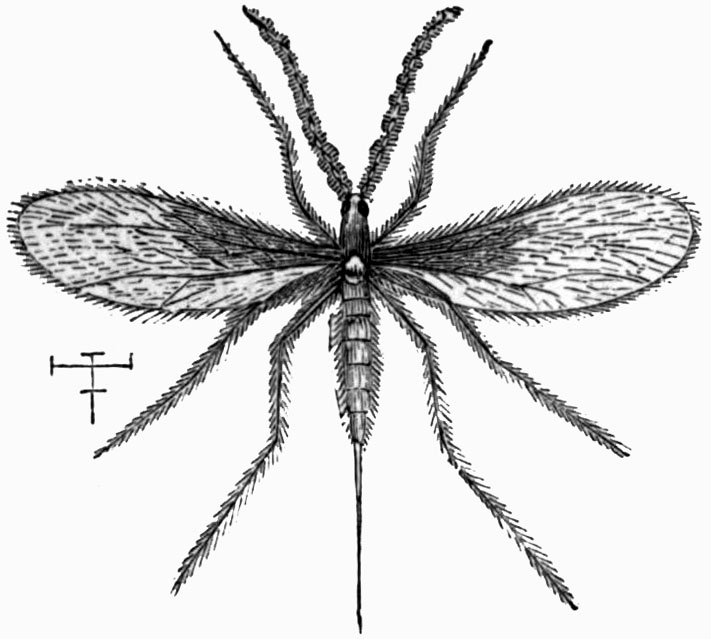

Scientific classification
- Kingdom: Animalia
- Phylum: Arthropoda
- Clade: Pancrustacea
- Class: Insecta
- Order: Diptera
- Family: Cecidomyiidae
- Genus: Contarinia
- Species: C. tritici

Binomial name
- Contarinia tritici (Kirby, 1798)

Synonyms
- Cecidomyia tritici (Kirby, 1798)

= Contarinia tritici =

Species of fly

Contarinia (formerly Diplosis or Mayetiola) tritici is a small dipterous insect of the family of gall gnats. It depredates wheat, to which it is nearly as destructive as the famous and closely allied species, the Hessian fly. As is typical for agricultural pests, the species is known by a number of common names, including wheat fly, lemon wheat blossom midge, wheat blossom midge, wheat yellow blossom midge, yellow wheat blossom midge, and yellow wheat gall midge.

== Description ==
The typical insect is 1/30 of an inch long, orange red, with whitish wings hairy on the edges, and black eyes. They deposit their eggs in the centre of the corolla of the wheat flower, coming out in great numbers between 7 and 9 p.m. early in June, several laying on the same ear. The eggs are hatched in eight to ten days.

The larvae, footless grubs nearly an eighth of an inch long when fully grown, feed upon the flower, rendering it abortive, and not upon the stem like the Hessian fly. They are yellowish, with sharp head and truncated tail, and have a quick wriggling motion. By the first of August they descend about half an inch into the earth, and remain there through the winter. The pupa is narrower, rufous, and sharp at both ends.

== History ==
An insect considered by Harris the same appeared in northern New England about 1828, whence it spread to Canada, Massachusetts, and New York, and disappeared only by being starved out by a change of crop or the substitution of late sown spring wheat. (See Harris, On the Insects injurious to Vegetation.)

== Treatment ==
In the late 19th century, the most efficacious remedies were: fumigations with sulphur for several evenings in succession while the grain was in blossom, lime and ashes strewn over them when wet with dew, liming and ploughing the soil into which they have burrowed, and sowing late in spring or early in autumn.

A little black ichneumon fly deposits her eggs within these larvae, and destroys many.
