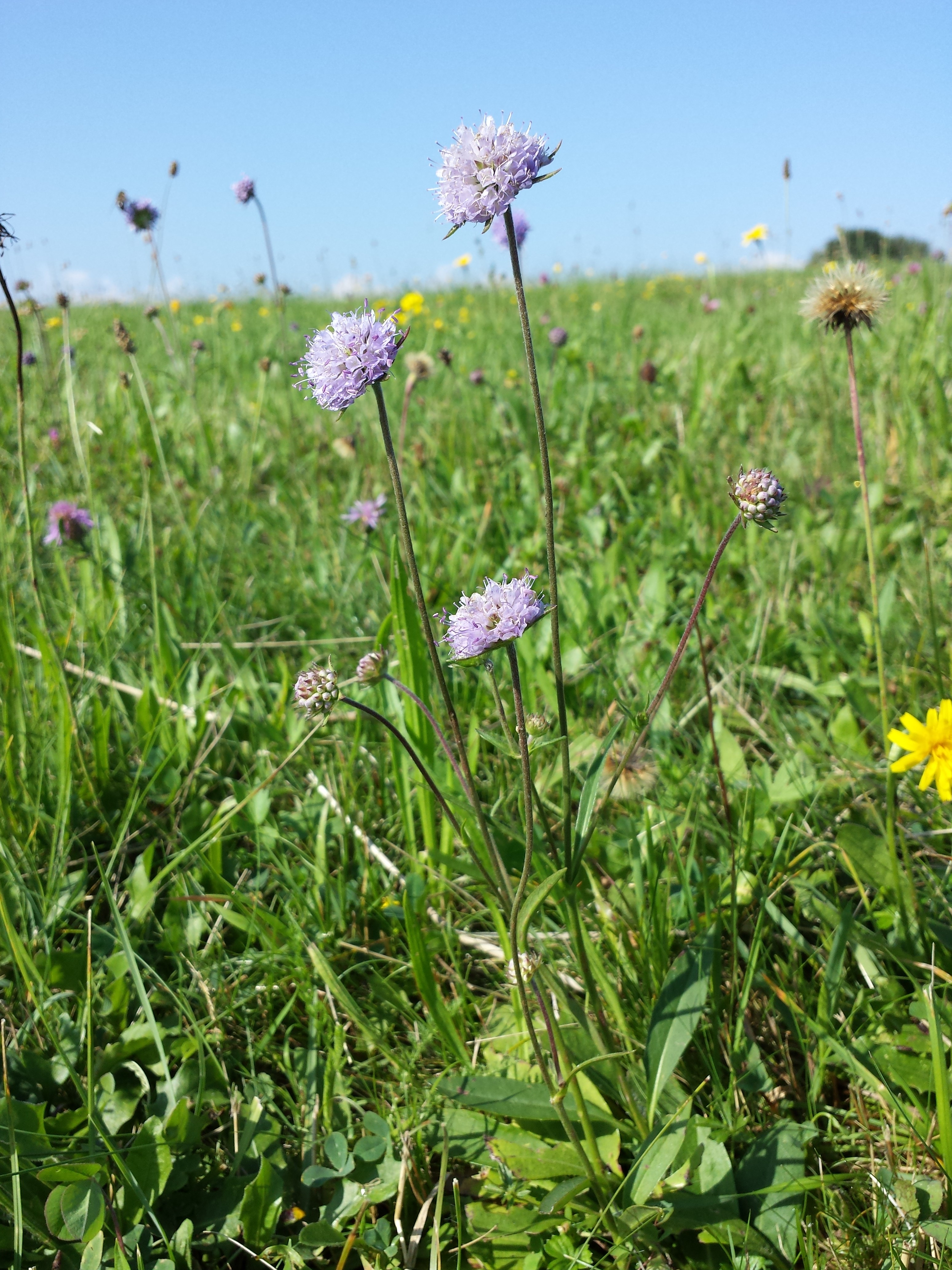

Scientific classification
- Kingdom: Plantae
- Clade: Tracheophytes
- Clade: Angiosperms
- Clade: Eudicots
- Clade: Asterids
- Order: Dipsacales
- Family: Caprifoliaceae
- Genus: Succisa
- Species: S. pratensis

Binomial name
- Succisa pratensis Moench

Synonyms
- List: Asterocephalus succisa (L.) Wallr.; Asterocephalus tomentosus Spreng.; Lepicephalus succisa (L.) Eichw.; Scabiosa borealis Salisb.; Scabiosa glabrata Schott; Scabiosa glabrata Hegetschw.; Scabiosa hirsuta Mazziari; Scabiosa praemorsa Gilib.; Scabiosa prolifera Mazziari; Scabiosa succisa L.; Scabiosa succisa var. arenaria Rouy; Scabiosa succisa var. grandifolia Rouy; Scabiosa succisa var. ovalis Rouy; Succisa altissima Schur; Succisa angustula Jord. & Fourr.; Succisa aurigerana Jord. & Fourr.; Succisa beugesiaca Jord. & Fourr.; Succisa brevis Jord. & Fourr.; Succisa cagiriensis Jeanb. & Timb.-Lagr.; Succisa cuspidata Jord.; Succisa dentata Jord. & Fourr.; Succisa elliptica Jeanb. & Timb.-Lagr.; Succisa fuchsii Gray; Succisa fuscescens Jord. & Fourr.; Succisa gigantea Jeanb. & Timb.-Lagr.; Succisa glabrata Jord. & Fourr.; Succisa glabrata (Schott) Sweet; Succisa gracilescens Jord. & Fourr.; Succisa incisa Jord. & Fourr.; Succisa laetevirens Jord. & Fourr.; Succisa microcephala Jord. & Fourr.; Succisa palustris Sass; Succisa parvula Jord. & Fourr.; Succisa platyphylla Jord. & Fourr.; Succisa praemorsa Asch.; Succisa pratensis var. arenaria (Rouy) P.D.Sell; Succisa pratensis var. grandifolia (Rouy) P.D.Sell; Succisa pratensis subsp. hirsuta (Opiz) Chrtek; Succisa pratensis var. ovalis (Rouy) P.D.Sell; Succisa pratensis subsp. scotiaca (Baksay) Chrtek; Succisa pratensis var. subacaulis (Bernardin) P.D.Sell; Succisa prativaga Jord. & Fourr.; Succisa procera Jord. & Fourr.; Succisa propera Jord. & Fourr.; Succisa pyrenaica Jord. & Fourr.; Succisa rhodanensis Jord. & Fourr.; Succisa sabauda Jord. & Fourr.; Succisa stricta Jord. & Fourr.; Succisa subacaulis Bernardin; Succisa sylvatica Jord. & Fourr.; Succisa tardans Jord. & Fourr.; Succisa viretorum Jord. & Fourr.; Succisa vogesiaca Jord. & Fourr.; Succisa vulgaris J.Presl & C.Presl

= Succisa pratensis =

Species of flowering plant in the honeysuckle family Caprifoliaceae

Succisa pratensis, known as devil's-bit scabious or simply devil's-bit, is a flowering plant in the honeysuckle family Caprifoliaceae, formerly included in the teasel family Dipsacaceae. It is common throughout northern Europe and western Asia in heathland, unimproved damp grassland and chalk or limestone grassland, where it is restricted to nutrient-poor soils. It has decreased somewhat due to agricultural intensification in many areas, but remains widespread and even common throughout its range. Its name derives from the curiously truncated root, which in ancient times was thought to be associated with magical or medicinal properties.

== Description ==
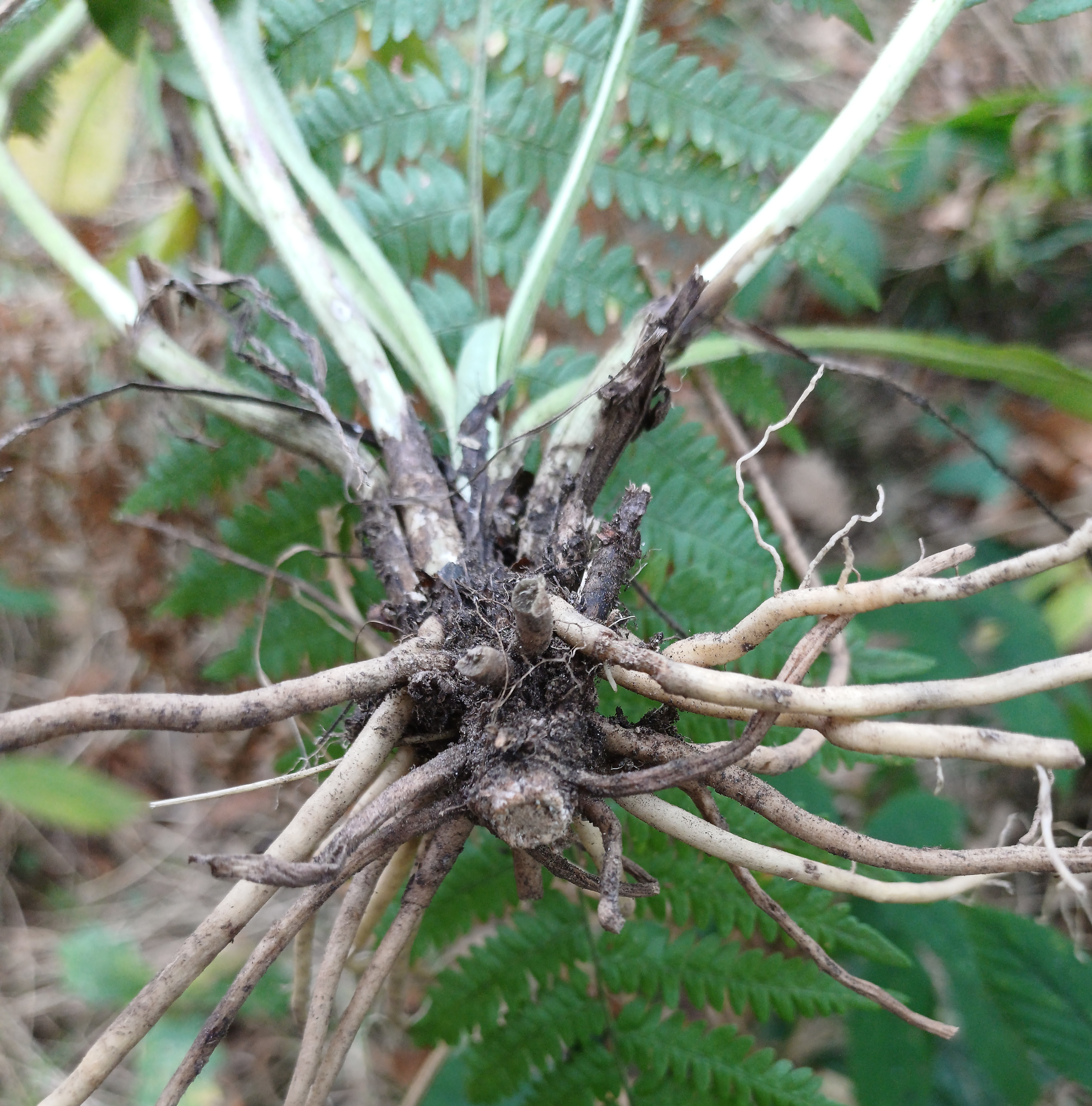
The root of a mature devil's-bit scabious, showing the premorse (bitten-off) taproot.

Devil's-bit scabious is a perennial herbaceous plant, sometimes growing to 1 m (3 ft) or more tall but often much smaller, for example just a few centimetres in montane heathland or Scottish machair. The stem is erect to ascending, often somewhat arched, roughly hairy and unbranched. The leaves are arranged in opposite pairs, the basal ones being 2-15 cm (exceptionally up to 30 cm) long, ovate and sometimes slightly toothed; the stem leaves being smaller and narrower, lanceolate, connate, and shortly sheathing around the stem. All the leaves have winged petioles up to 2 cm long and are also roughly hairy. A curious feature of this plant is the taproot, which grows to about 5 mm thickness in its first year and then becomes woody and dies away at the tip, leaving a premorse stump that produces shallower-growing lateral roots in the second year.

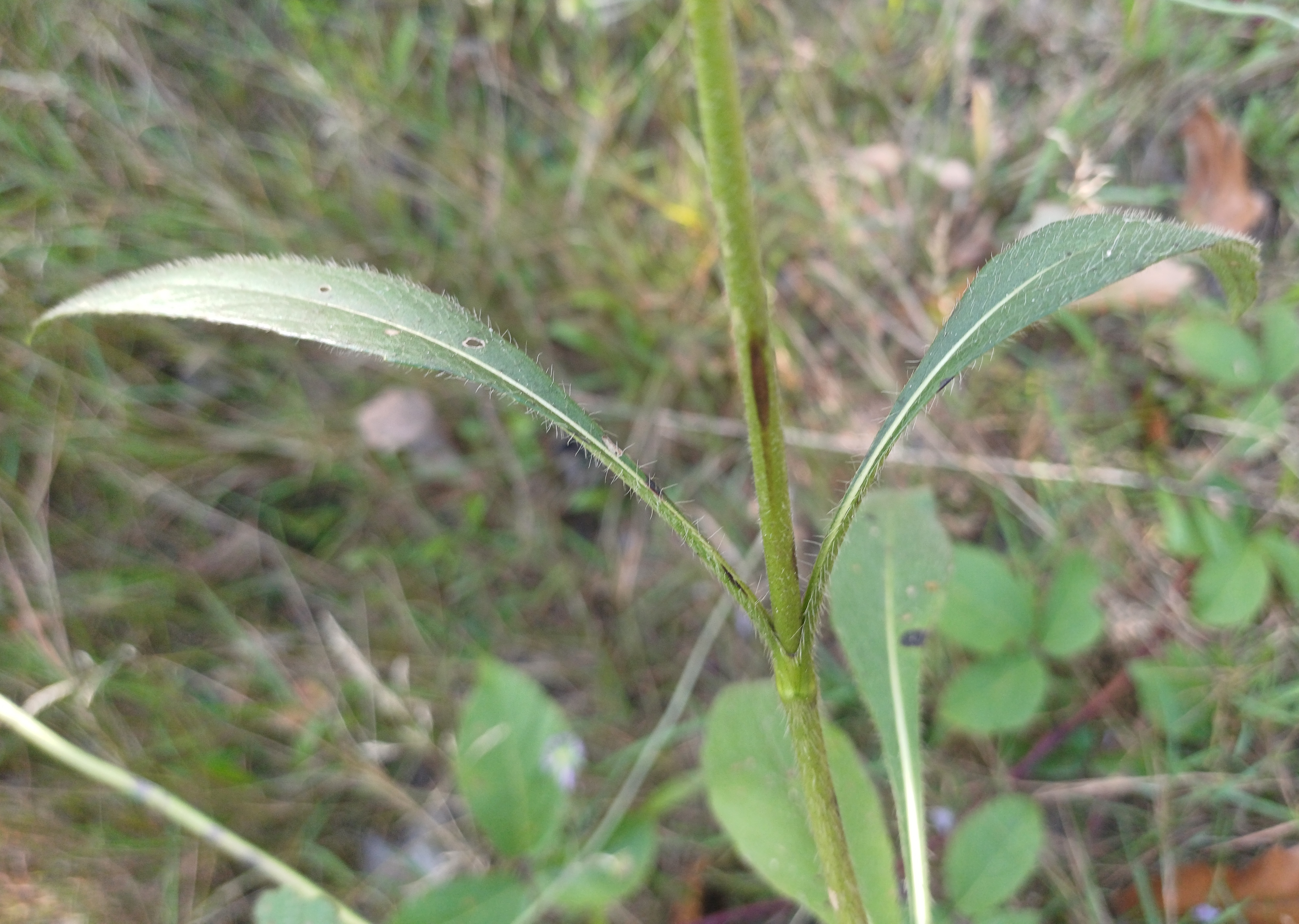
The leaves are connate and shortly sheathing around the stem.

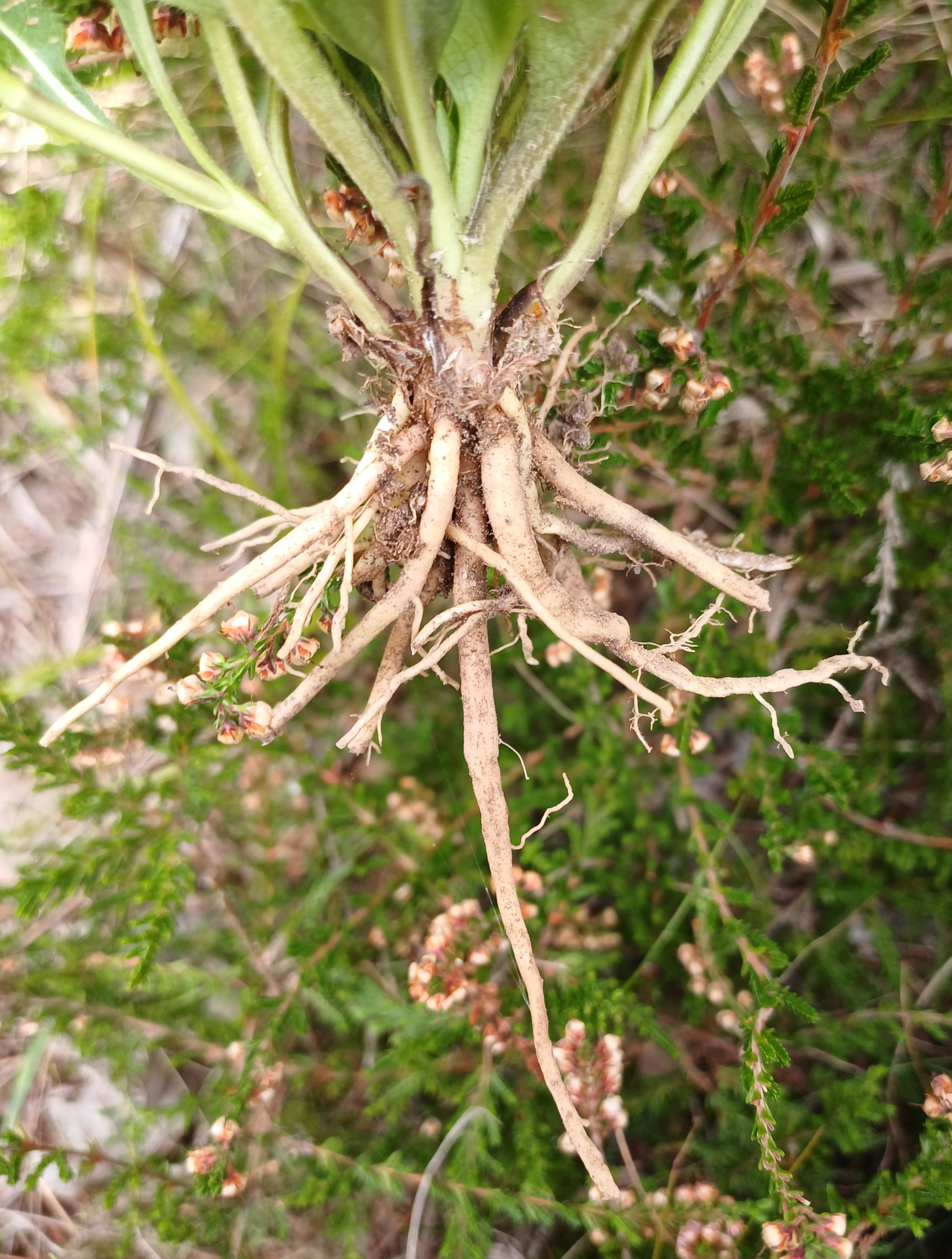
First year plants have a full-length taproot.

Inflorescences are either terminal or in the leaf axils and consist of one, three or sometimes more compound flower heads or capitula, each of which contain 30-50 bluish to violet (occasionally pink or white) flowers in a tightly-packed, almost hemispherical dome 15-25 mm across. Below the flowerhead there are two rows of green involucral bracts up to 10 mm long. The receptacle is up to 10 mm across and slightly elongated. Within the flowerhead there are numerous ciliate bracts and as many flowers, which are made up of an epicalyx or "involucel" which is formed from 4 fused bracteoles, a calyx tube with 4 lobes terminated by 4-5 black bristles, and a corolla up to 7 mm long, also with 4 lobes. All the flowers are similar as they are not divided into ray and disc florets.

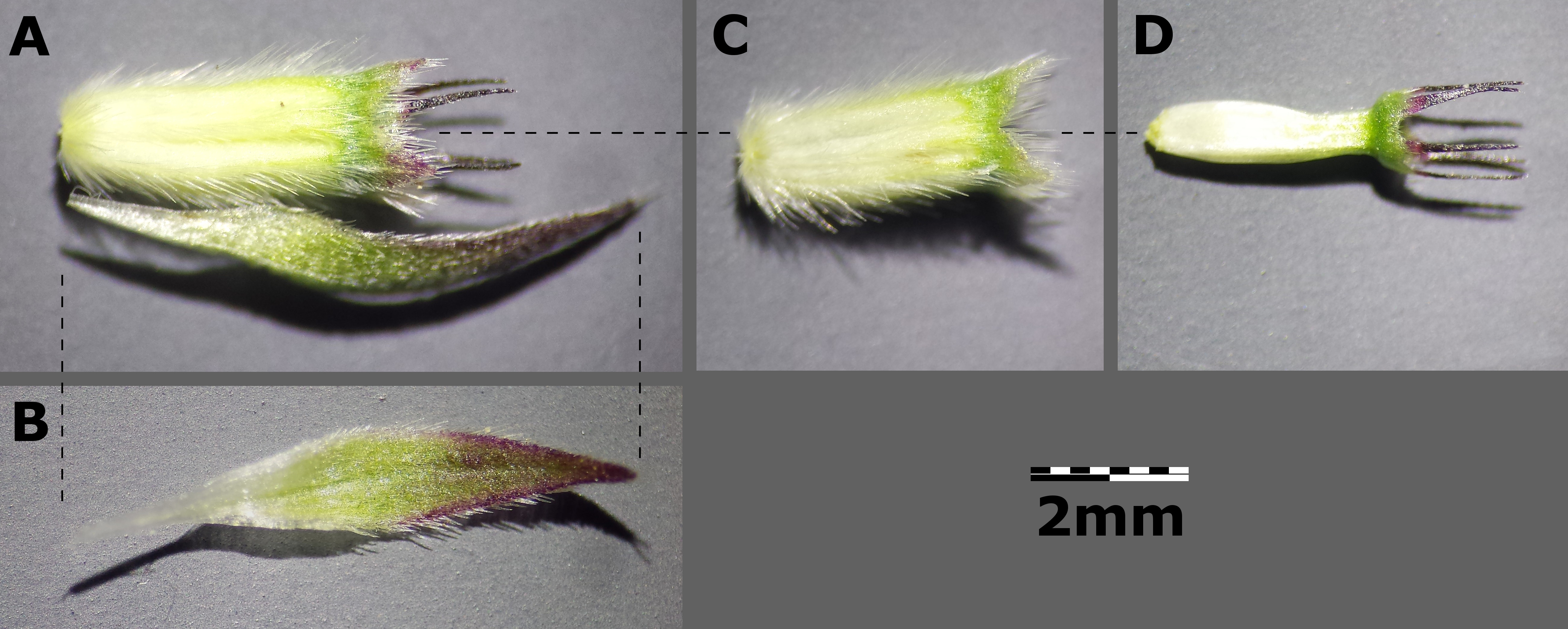
Dissected base of a single flower(A), showing a bract (B) the epicalyx (C) and calyx (D).

The flowers are all bisexual (hermaphroditic), but on a proportion of flowerheads a majority of anthers may be abortive, thus creating the impression of gynodioecy. They are also protandrous, which means the male parts mature first, followed by the female. This adds to the appearance of dioecy. In fact the flowers all produce 4 stamens with very long filaments and purple anthers, and one style with a cream-coloured stigma. The fruit is a small achene, about 0.5 mm long.

== Taxonomy ==
Devil's-bit scabious was not known, or at least not mentioned, by the Ancient Greek and Roman herbalists, presumably because it does not grow in those regions. The earliest mention of it in literature may have been in Camerer's 1586 edition of Pietro Andrea Mattioli's herbal De Plantis Epitome Utilissima. The name he gives is Succisa Officinis, Morsus diaboli, which is a typical pre-Linnaean polynomial and not valid as a modern botanical name.

Linnaeus renamed it Scabiosa succisa in Species Plantarum, 1753, but it was returned to the genus Succisa by Conrad Moench in 1794 and renamed pratensis. This name has been accepted ever since, but while modern books separate the genus Succisa from Scabiosa by the number of corolla lobes, that is not the distinction that Moench made.

The scientific name comes from the Latin succisus, which means cut down or truncated, while pratensis means "of the meadow". Linnaeus's name for it, Scabiosa, derives from the Latin verb scabo, scabere: "to scratch." The "devil's-bit" name is sometimes said to refer to the devil biting off the root, or to its use in treating devil's bites, or scabies.

There are no recorded hybrids of devil's-bit scabious, but numerous subspecies and varieties have been described. Adams (1955) lists several of these and reports how most of the characters are quickly lost in cultivation, which suggests that they are merely ecotypes. Some authorities still claim to recognise some regional subspecies, such as var. subcaulis (Bernardin.) P.D. Sell from Cornwall and the Scottish isles, and var. ovalis (Ruoy) P.D. Sell, which is supposed to occur only at Pixey Mead in Oxfordshire, but these are not widely accepted.

Its chromosome number is 2n = 20.

== Identification ==
Devil's-bit can be easily confused with field scabious, greater knapweed and small scabious, but those plants all have enlarged ray florets and lobed leaves. Sheep's-bit can resemble a small devil's-bit, but it has 5-lobed flowers and club-shaped anthers.

The white midrib allows the overwintering rosettes to be distinguished from those of knapweed.

== Distribution and status ==
Devil's-bit scabious is common throughout most of the British Isles, western and central Europe, extending eastwards into central Asia, and it has been introduced to eastern North America. It occurs from sea level to high mountain pastures, growing as high as 2,400 m in Hungary.

There has been no change in its range or distribution in Britain since the 1950s, but it is believed to have decreased in abundance and declined locally due to intensification of agriculture in the late 20th century. In northern and western counties it is considered to be ubiquitous on all soils and at all altitudes, while in the south and east it is highly restricted to areas with suitable soils. Adams (1955) considered it to be more common on disturbed ground and ditch sides, such as Stone Age ditches at Avebury and Roman workings at Hadrian's Wall.

Although its status globally has not been assessed by the IUCN, most countries consider devil's-bit not to be threatened and have given it a status of LC (least concern). In Britain its overall status is also LC, but in most English counties it is thought to be at least in a long-term decline.

It is considered an axiophyte in most counties in England, Wales and Scotland.

== Habitat and ecology ==
Devil's-bit scabious grows in a wide variety of habitats but in many places, rather confusingly, it is restricted to highly localised areas on specific soil types. Adams (1955) listed its habitats in Britain as "deciduous woods (except beech), rides in coniferous plantations, poor pastures, fens, bogs roadsides, sea-cliffs and... sandy or marshy ground near the seashore." Despite this apparently wide range of situations, they are all nutrient-poor and reasonably open to sunlight. Thus, it may be abundant along a woodland ride but absent from the closed wood, or common in chalk downland but eliminated entirely from areas of farmland. Its Ellenberg values in Britain are L = 7, F = 7, R = 5, N = 2, and S = 0, which reflect how it favours damp, reasonably sunny places with neutral soils and very low fertility, and that it does not tolerate salt.

The flowers are visited by various types of insects, but especially frequently by hoverflies of the genus Eristalis. It is a good source of nectar, and is the larval food plant of the marsh fritillary, the eggs of which are laid in groups on the underside of the plant, and the narrow-bordered bee hawk-moth (Hemaris tityus).

The flowers are galled by the gall midge Contarinia dipsacearum, the leaves by the triozid bug Trioza munda, and the roots by the nematode Meloidogyne hapla.

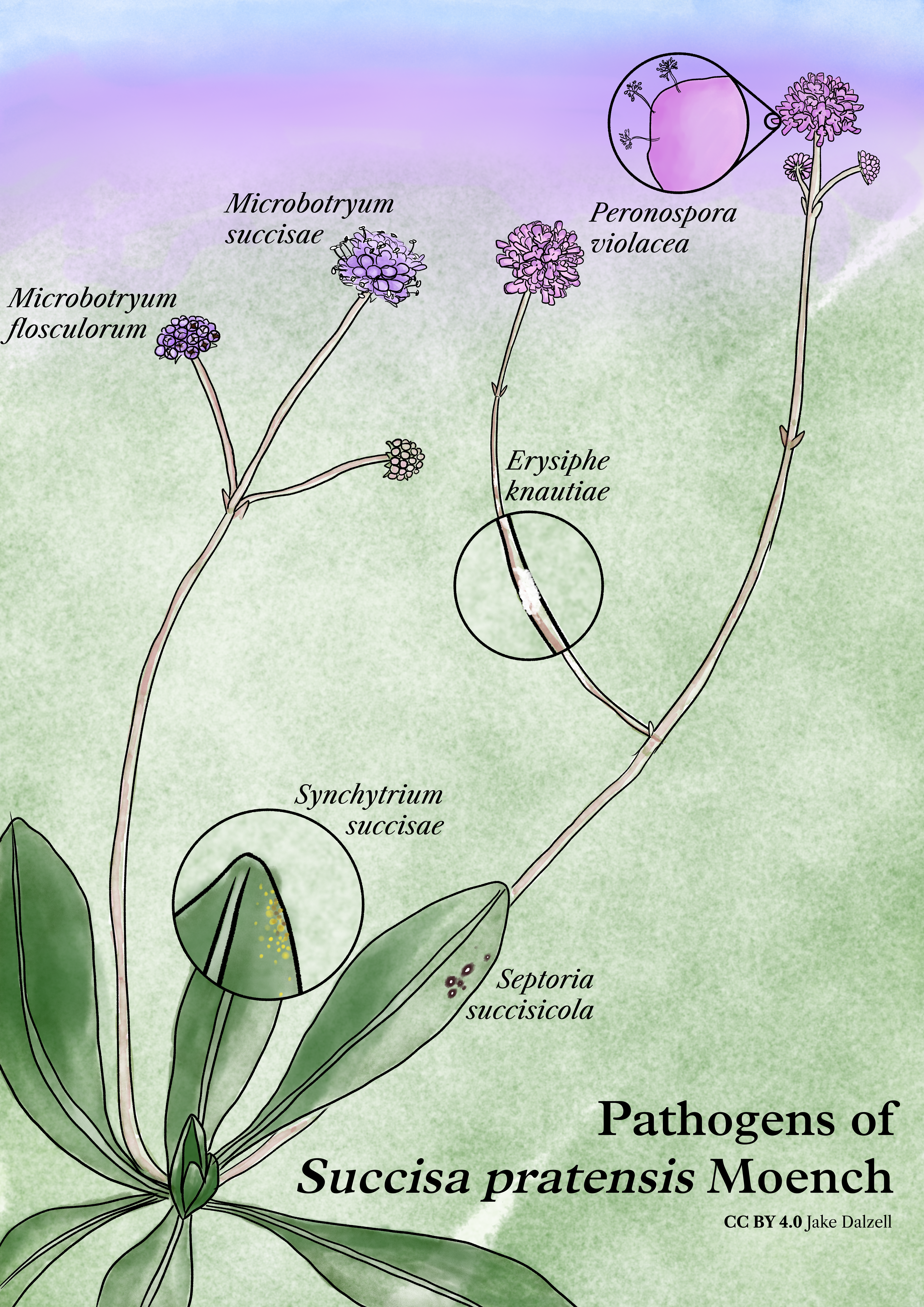
An illustration showing some of the fungal and oomycetous pathogens that infect Succisa pratensis.

The leaves are parasitized by the chytrid fungus Synchytrium succisae, the powdery mildew Erysiphe knautiae, the rust fungus Aecidium succisae, and the leaf spot fungi Fusicladium consors, Ramularia succisae, Septoria succisicola, and Septoria scabiosicola. The flowers are parasitised by the smut fungi Microbotryum succisae and Microbotryum flosculorum, and the downy mildew Peronospora violacea.

== Management ==
Its conservation is best promoted by an uneven patchwork of short and long vegetation by the end of the grazing period, between 8 and 25 cm (3.1 and 9.8 in). This can be achieved through low intensity grazing (also known as extensive grazing) using cattle. Sheep are not so good as they are more efficient at removing wild plants.

== In culture ==
Allen and Hatfield describe how the truncated root of devil's-bit may have inspired belief in its magical properties, and led to its use as treatment for 'devil's bites' (scabies). They also claim it had a "well-founded reputation as an antiseptic" in Britain and the Isle of Man.

Nicholas Culpeper referred to devil's-bit as Marsus Diaboli (the devil's bite) and claimed that it was useful to take away swellings in the mouth. He wrote that there was not "a more present remedy in the world for those cold swellings in the neck which the vulgar call the 'almonds of the ears' than this herb bruised and applied to them". "Almonds of the ears" is an old name for the tonsils.
