= Virginia, County Cavan =

Town in County Cavan, Ireland

Virginia Achadh an Iúir
- Town
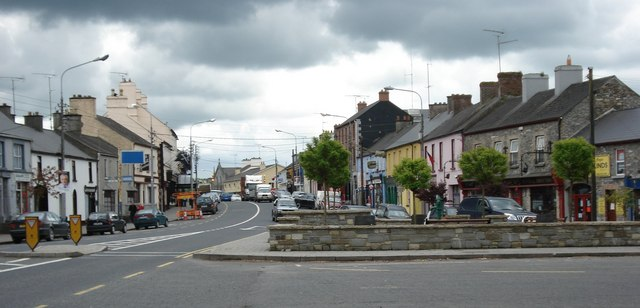
- Main Street and Square

- Location in Ireland
- Coordinates: 53°50′00″N 7°05′00″W
- Country: Ireland
- Province: Ulster
- County: County Cavan
- Barony: Castlerahan
- Elevation: 113 m (371 ft)

Population (2022)
  - Total: 3,211
- Irish grid reference: N604876
- Website: www.virginia.ie

Virginia (Irish: Achadh an Iúir, meaning 'field of the yew') is a town in County Cavan, Ireland. Founded in the 17th century as a plantation town, it now holds both local industry and commuter housing.

== History ==
=== Foundation ===
Virginia was founded in the early 17th century, at Aghanure (Irish: Achadh an Iúir, meaning 'field of the yew'), during the Plantation of Ulster and was named Virginia after Queen Elizabeth I of England, the "Virgin Queen."

The settlement was started when an English adventurer named John Ridgeway was granted the Crown patent in August 1612 to build a new town, situated upon the Great Road, approximately midway between the towns of Kells and Cavan. The chosen site was, according to tradition, where a ruined Ó Raghallaigh (O'Reilly) castle stood, and was then described as Aghaler, a location once set within the ancient Lurgan parish townland of Ballaghanea. The patented conditions of the settlement were to introduce English settlers to the area and build the town to incorporate borough status. Ridgeway had difficulty in attracting sufficient English tradespeople and settler families into what was then regarded as a hostile territory outside of the protection of the Pale, so he only managed to build a few wooden cabins and a corn mill near to the castle. His new town was situated close to the shores of Lough Ramor.

Ridgeway passed the patent on to another Englishman, Captain Hugh Culme, who already possessed lands beside Lough Oughter in County Cavan and had access to building timber. Culme persuaded the Plantation Commission to move the location of Virginia to its present site close to the Blackwater tributary river, whereupon he built a number of cabins for the settlers but still failed to meet the commission's time frame for developing the town further before giving up on the task, probably for the same reasons as his predecessor.

=== The Plunketts ===
During November 1622, the Virginia estate came into the possession of the 10th Baron Killeen (who was created the 1st Earl of Fingall in 1628), who also held extensive lands around County Meath. Lord Killeen, who was a Catholic Anglo-Irish peer of Norman descent, whose family had come to Ireland in the twelfth century, undertook to complete the patented project. Complaints from the Virginia inhabitants about the lack of development progress reached the commission by 1638 whereupon Christopher Plunkett, 2nd Earl of Fingall (who had succeeded his father in the earldom in 1637) was ordered to submit a substantial bond with the commission's court, and to build the church in Virginia or face forfeiture of his County Cavan lands. The Anglican Bishop of Kilmore, William Bedell, undertook to lay out the town in accordance with the commission's requirement. However, events which led to the Irish Rebellion of 1641 and Irish Confederate Wars enveloped Virginia causing widespread destruction and depopulation. The summer of 1642 saw the outright destruction by government forces of the castle along with the burning of stocks of hay, corn and turf in a bid to punish the outlawed Lord Fingall for his role in the Siege of Drogheda (1641).

What remained of Virginia after the wars can be assessed through hearth tax records from the 1660s, indicating a small resident community. During the following century estate surveys were undertaken for the absentee landlord (exiled since the Williamite wars of 1688–91) which tell of a wayside Inn that existed since the earliest times (exact location unknown), operated then in 1727 by a Cornelius Donnellan and was frequented around that time by Jonathan Swift during his several excursions to County Cavan.

=== The Taylours ===
The Virginia estate was eventually sold around the year 1750, on behalf of the Plunketts, to pay off mounting debts, with a new landlord family, the Taylors (later spelt as Taylour), taking over. Virginia and its surrounding estate were particularly developed by Thomas Taylor (1724-1795), who built up the town and succeeded where others had failed. Taylor (who changed the spelling of the family surname to Taylour) succeeded his father in the baronetcy in 1757. The then Sir Thomas Taylour, 3rd Bt., was created 1st Baron Headfort in 1760, and 1st Viscount Headfort in 1762. Lord Headfort was further advanced in the peerage to become The 1st Earl of Bective in 1766. It is recorded that Lord Bective's great-grandfather, also a Thomas Taylor, was a cartographer who assisted Sir William Petty with the Down Survey during the previous century.

The Taylor (later Taylour) family had built a substantial mansion, Headfort House (now a school), beside Kells in the north of County Meath. The family (who were granted the title Marquis of Headfort in 1800) now turned their attention to making the unproductive lands around Virginia into profitable farms through land drainage and afforestation of low-lying areas, also resulting in increases in rent paid by the farm tenants. While this in itself was not unique among Irish landlords, an acre of land at twenty old pennies (20>240) became fifteen shillings (180>240) per acre before the end of the century with a premium paid by flax growers. The results of which brought employment and management to the Headfort estates and quickly led to the setting up of markets and fairs in Virginia where local produce including flax yarn and linen was traded on the streets. Virginia's population doubled between the census years of 1821 to 1841, and there was rapid construction in the town, leading to the Main Street as it is seen today. Successive Marquesses of Headfort created their own private demesne and a hunting lodge (now Virginia Park Lodge) overlooking Lough Ramor. The Lodge is now owned by Irish Celebrity Chef Richard Corrigan.

=== Famine and emigration ===
The Great Famine, caused by successive failures in the potato crop and the export of other foodstuffs outside of Ireland, brought with it extreme hardship for the poorer classes, with death due to diseases like typhus and cholera, prevalent due to poor sanitation, contaminated drinking water and other poor living conditions. Starvation, which impacted many parts of the country, was averted in Virginia due to the efforts of the local Famine Relief Committee, who made extra rations of Indian meal available in return for hard labour, this included women and children breaking stones for making roads and the building of the local Catholic church which took place during 1845 on lands donated by the landlord.

In subsequent years Virginia prospered with the introduction of a butter market in 1856, followed by the opening of the Great Northern Railway (GNR) line between Kells and Oldcastle in March 1863. Cattle and livestock could then be moved for export, however, this also meant that products such as coal and beer could be transported from the larger towns into rural areas which led to the closure of the local malt brewery and several bakeries in the town.

Perhaps the most famous Virginia emigrant was General Philip H. Sheridan (1831-1888), whose parents came from nearby Killinkere, left Ireland around 1830 and settled in America. Sheridan achieved success, and notoriety, through a military career, particularly during the American Civil War. President Lincoln stated, "this Sheridan is a little Irishman, but a big fighter", he eventually became commanding General of the US Army and had many honours bestowed upon him.

The closure of the Virginia Roads railway station, and GNR line, in 1958, came about as Ireland's population fell to its lowest levels - the 1951 census lists Virginia with a population of just 297 persons.

=== Modern development ===
In 2007 the local development association submitted a proposal to have a new regional hospital built near Virginia, on a site owned by Cavan County Council. Although supported by the community and the region's political representatives, the bid was not progressed due to the lack of project funding. Road transport links to Virginia have seen some improvement since the opening in 2010 of the M3 motorway linking Virginia to Dublin. This led to a rise in local developments, with a number of new houses and commercial businesses being built.

== Geography ==
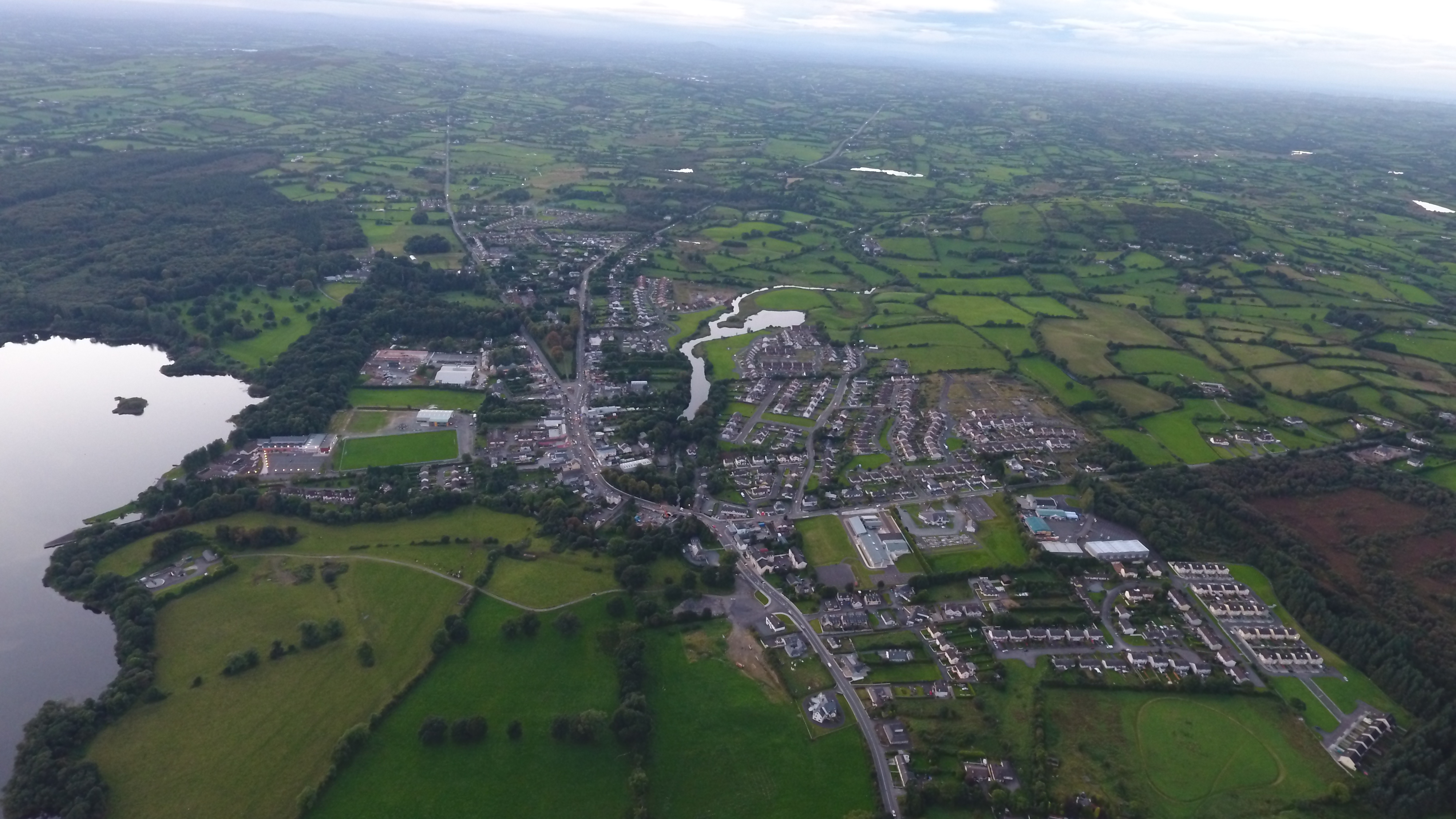
Virginia by Lough Ramor

The town is situated close to Lough Ramor, one of the larger lakes in County Cavan, stretching approximately 7 km in length by 1 km at the narrowest point, and feeding into the Blackwater and Boyne river systems.

== Transport ==
Virginia is on the N3 route approximately 85 km northwest of Dublin, and was once a staging and rest point for the coaches plying between Enniskillen and Dublin. Virginia is connected to Dublin by an hourly bus service from Cavan town Bus Éireann. The M3 motorway was completed in 2010 and links the North-West of Dublin to the nearby town of Kells, 20 km from Virginia.

A 12.5 km long bypass for the town of type 2 dual carriageway, intended to reduce congestion going through the town centre was planned but suspended in the late 2000s. In February 2018, the project was placed as a key project in the National Development Plan, part of 'Project Ireland 2040'.

== Economy ==
Sometimes regarded as a commuter town with its proximity to larger trading towns east and west, the local industry consists mainly of farming and milk processing at the local Tirlán factory (formerly Virginia Milk Products), which produces skim milk powder and cream for the Baileys Irish Cream liqueur brand. Other local manufacturers include the Fleetwood brand of paint products.

Virginia won the Tidy Towns Competition in 1964 and 1965.

== Culture ==
The Ramor Theatre opened in 1999, and is funded by Cavan County Council and the Arts Council. It is the only professional performance space in the county. The theatre is a member of the NOMAD network of venues, and home to the Livin' Dred Theatre Company. The theatre also engages in community-based and amateur work through Ramor Players who present a number of shows each year.

Virginia has been home to the annual Virginia Agricultural Show for over seventy years and hosted Ireland's only pumpkin festival in 2007. The Virginia Pumpkin Festival takes place every October bank holiday weekend at Halloween. It took a break in 2017 and is yet to resume as of 2026.

== Demographics ==
The town population was 3,211, as of the 2022 census. The ethnic makeup (of those stated) was 77% White Irish, 12% Other White, 1% Black/Black Irish, 3% Asian/Asian Irish and 2% Other.

== Education ==
A large primary school in the town is St Mary's NS, located next to St Mary's Roman Catholic Church. The school's population is over 400 pupils. The primary school received an extension in 2014.

Virginia College, Cavan, formerly Virginia Vocational School, was founded in 1962 and is the only secondary school in Virginia. Situated beside Lough Ramor, it is a mixed school educating approximately 740 pupils as of 2017. Three extensions were built in 1988, 2006 and 2012. A fourth extension was planned by the Cavan and Monaghan Education Training Board as of 2024. Virginia College celebrated its 50th anniversary in 2012. This was followed by a visit to the school by the President of Ireland, Michael D. Higgins.

== Notable people ==
- Thomas Fitzpatrick (1832–1900), noted London physician
- Agnes O'Farrelly (1874–1951), founding member of Cumann na mBan, from Rafoney
- Michael Router (born 1965), Roman Catholic prelate, current auxiliary bishop of Armagh and titular bishop of Lugmad, grew up in Rahardrum
- Sir Josias Rowley (1765–1842), 1st Bt. and Royal Navy Admiral, a native of County Leitrim whose brother, Rev. John Rowley, was an Anglican clergyman and incumbent at Virginia during the period that the First Fruits church was built; Admiral Rowley also helped to finance its reconstruction after a major fire destroyed the roof on Christmas night 1830
- Richard Brinsley Sheridan (1751–1816), playwright and grandson to Thomas Sheridan
- Thomas Sheridan (1687–1738), master of a classical school and later headmaster of Royal School Cavan
- Jonathan Swift (1667–1745), penned Gulliver's Travels while staying nearby at Quilca, the home of his cleric friend Thomas Sheridan

== See also ==
- Lough Ramor
- Clayton and Bell Stained glass church window maker

== Sources ==
- Virginia - One for the Road by local historian Chris Kirk ~ a survey of the past 400 years using archive material, maps and photographs.
- Griffiths Valuations
