= Lough Ramor =

Lake in County Cavan, Ireland

- Loch Ramhar (Irish)
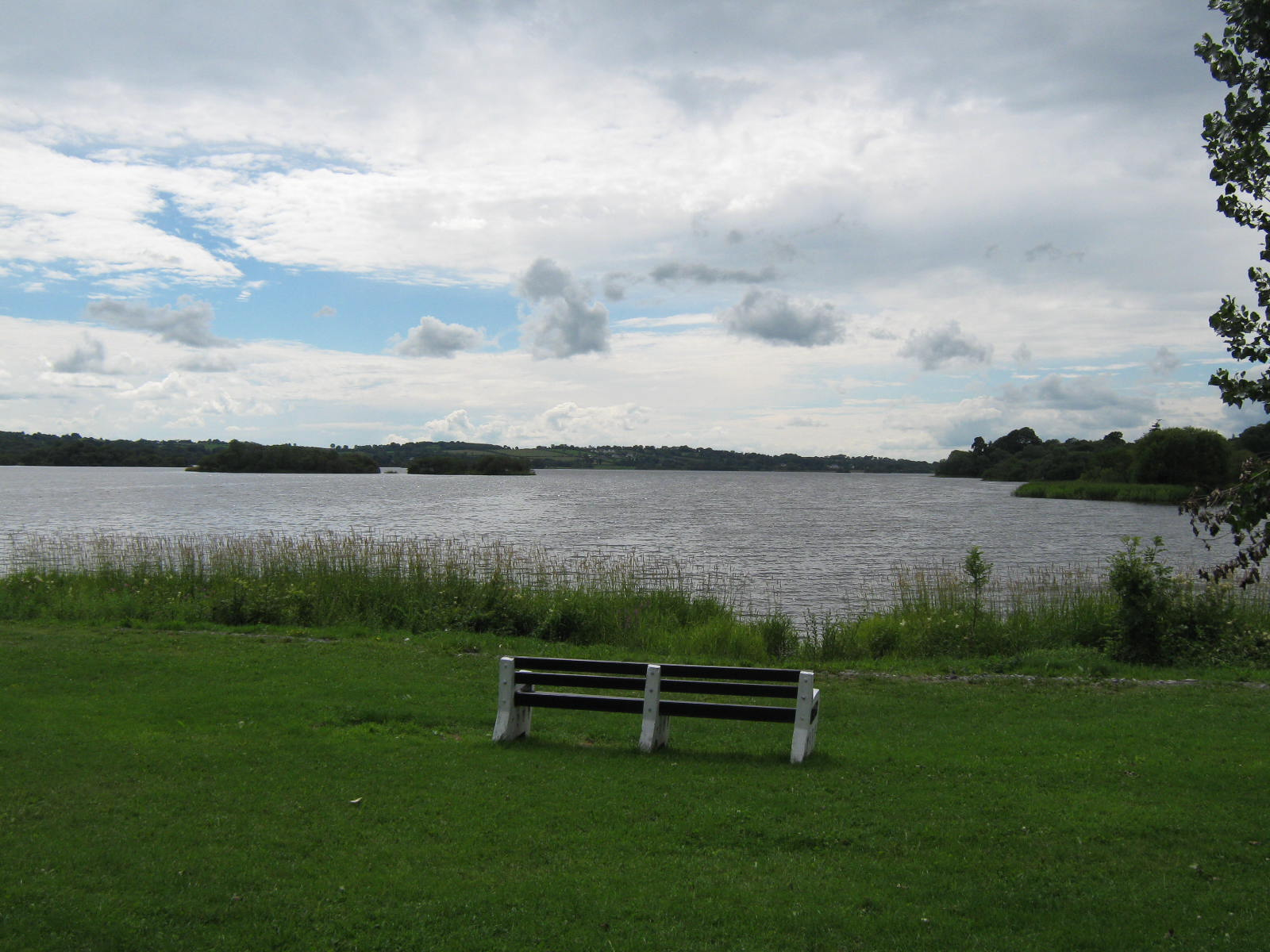

- Location in Ireland
- Location: County Cavan
- Coordinates: 53°49′N 7°5′W
- Type: Glacial
- Primary inflows: River Blackwater
- Primary outflows: River Blackwater
- Catchment area: River Boyne
- Basin countries: Ireland
- Surface area: 7.41 km^{2} (2.86 sq mi)
- Average depth: 3 m (9.8 ft)
- Max. depth: 5.5 m (18 ft)
- Water volume: 22,000 m^{3} (18 acre⋅ft)
- Residence time: 0.17 years

Lough Ramor (Irish: Loch Ramhar) is a large natural lake of 741 hectares situated near Virginia, County Cavan. From early records Vita Tripartita identified as being in the territory of Cenal Muinreamhair. The literal meaning of the term Muinreamhair is 'fat-neck' and appears to be derived from a prehistoric or mythical ancestor warrior, connoting great strength. Loch Muinreamhair also appears in early manuscripts of the Four Masters.

Lough Ramor is a proposed Natural Heritage Area (pNHA) and flows into the Blackwater, designated a Special Area of Conservation (SAC) under the Natura 2000 wildlife habitat conservation programme.

== Natural environment ==
Lough Ramor is a partly wooded wetland site, a haven for many species of wildlife both resident and migratory. Available recorded history indicates that nearly half of the 170 acres (0.69 km^{2}) of Deerpark woodland was once oak woodland, the timber being used for building and agricultural purposes. During the seventeenth century it was reported that early Virginia settlers had to transport their building timber from west Cavan and Fermanagh. The early nineteenth century saw extensive tree planting of ash, elm, oak, larch, spruce and Scots pine. In recent times additional broad leaf varieties were planted including sycamore.

The most recent site study conducted by the Government Department of the Environment describes the Lough Ramor area as a hollow in the Silurian strata that covers most of eastern County Cavan. Lough Ramor is a very shallow lake with a pH of 7.5 and a maximum depth of six metres. The water is nutritionally poor but is periodically enriched, resulting in algal blooms. Being situated on a different rock type than other Cavan lakes it differs also in appearance. Much of the shore has semi-natural woodland of alder, willows and hazel. The stands near Virginia were originally planted.

Hazel and hawthorn scrub is widespread on relatively dry sites with bramble, false brome, wood sedge, violet, bluebell, wild hyacinth and primrose. Where such communities occur on a rocky shore crab apple often grows with roses and dog violet. The scrub grades into woodland in several places on the southern shore and here ash and oak occur with holly. The bird community in such sites include treecreeper, long-tailed tit, chiffchaff, willow warbler and locally blackcap, common woodpigeon, sparrowhawk, jay, pheasant and woodcock are also found.

The islands are mostly covered by Willows, in more open places black-headed gulls nest, mallard, teal and red-breasted merganser breed on the island, great crested grebe largely use the mainland shores of the lake.

Freshwater marshes exist in many places around the shore but extensive reed-beds stretching out into the lake are rare. The margins of the marshes are mostly sedge dominated by such species as bottle sedge, bladder-sedge, tufted-sedge, common-sedge and occasionally water-sedge, water horsetail, marsh cinquefoil and bur-reeds also occur commonly. Also on the fringes occurs a more varied community characteristic of base-poor areas, with such species as marsh ragwort, lesser spearwort, devil's-bit scabious, marsh-bedstraw and hoary willowherb, creeping bent, sweet vernal-grass, Yorkshire fog and purple moor-grass. Cuckooflower occurs commonly and bog violet and greater spearwort are to be found in places.

Stretches of the shore with muddy or stony substrates provide niches for bur marigold and the scarce tasteless water-pepper and small water-pepper.

The lake supports nationally important numbers of great cormorant (averaging around 200) and notable concentrations of whooper swan, wigeon, teal, mallard, grey heron and lapwing. Curlew and lapwing also nest in the fringing marshes.

The plant communities along the lake margins are of note and combine with over wintering bird numbers to make Lough Ramor an important wetland site.

== Early Christian settlements ==
References to an early Christian foundation in the Loch Muinreamhair area are found in the Martyrology of Donegal, where 6 February is recorded as the festival of Saints Brandubh and Coluim of Loch Muinreamhair. There is a similar entry in the Felire of Gorman and other undated Irish Calendars. It is thought that these people flived shortly after the introduction of Christianity, during the fifth century. It is assumed that an island or crannog was used as the initial foundation for the early church in Loch Muinreamhair. One such island has the remains of medieval ecclesiastical associations, its early name is not recorded, but since the early eighteenth century it has been known locally as Woodward's Island, after a prominent Kells family who built a villa upon the island.

The medieval island church belonged to the Augustinian Abbey of St. Mary's in Ceannannus (Kells), an Anglo-Norman institution, not to be confused with the early Columban Abbey of Ceannannus that was founded by Saint Columcille. There was a local tradition that some of the early period monks who lived on the island were killed by thieves who plundered the church. The Augustinians acquired the site, probably during the 13th century, after the ecclesiastical diocese boundaries were changed to include the new diocese of Kilmore in the territory then known as East Breifne.

Neither saints Brandubh or Coluin are mentioned in the Annals of the Four Masters. The name Brandubh (literally interpreted as Black Raven) is mentioned as being the King of Leinster, who died in the year 601.

A warlike race of people called Luigni and Gailanga ruled over the Blackwater and Ramor regions, where it may be inferred that St.Patrick sent missionaries into the territory and that Saints Brandubh and Coluin were these early missionaries.

== Early civilisations ==
There is evidence of early civilisation in the Lough Ramor region dating back to 2000BC. There once stood a Neolithic dolmen, or burial site, in the townland of Ballaghanea. Other stone markings dating from the period of the Bronze Age have been identified in Munterconnacht.

The island ecclesiastical site, described above, comes into prominence during 845, when the Four Masters describes the territory of the Luigni of Sliabh Guire. They were a warlike tribe introduced from the western seaboard and established during the third century, one of a chain of 'buffer states' to guard the frontiers of the kingdom of Tara. Traces ring forts of many raths, lios and ring forts abound the region. Maelseachlainn, King of Meath led an attack to exterminate a band of marauders who established a stronghold on the island. The chronicles describe the event:

"The demolition of the island of Loch Muinreamhair by Maelseachlainn, son of Maelruanaidh against a crowd of 'sons of death' of the Luigni and Gailenga who were plundering the districts at the instigation of the foreigners (Norsemen) and they were destroyed by him."

A similar mention is entered in the Annals of Ulster given as the year 846. But local tradition tells of the robbers fighting amongst themselves for a share of the spoils from various plundering raids including the island church, may be an echo down through the centuries that fierce battles did however take place upon a hillock known locally as Cnoc Fola, the hill of blood.

== Connections ==
The Virginia GAA team, Ramor United is named after the lake, as is a local theatre.

== See also ==
- Virginia, County Cavan
- List of Irish loughs
