= R191 road (Ireland) =

Road in Ireland

Coordinates: 54.063388°N 7.060836°W

R191 road
- Bóthar R191
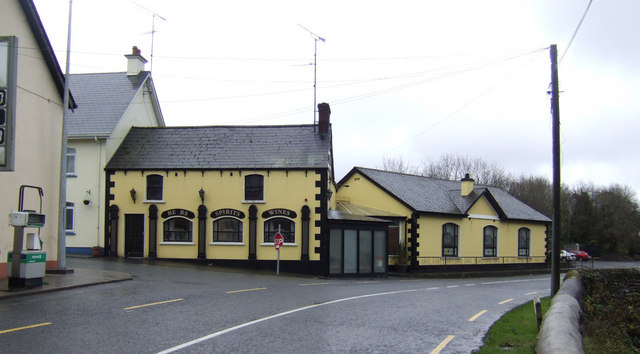
- R191 passing through Canningstown

Route information
- Length: 33.1 km (20.6 mi)

Major junctions
- From: R190 Lisnasaran
- Crosses Annalee River; Passes through Canningstown; R165 Bailieborough; R178 Bailieborough; Enters County Meath and then reenters County Cavan
- To: R194 Mullagh

Location
- Country: Ireland

Highway system
- Roads in Ireland; Motorways; Primary; Secondary; Regional

The R191 road is a regional road in Ireland, located in County Cavan and County Meath.
