= Moynalty =

Village in County Meath, Ireland

Moynalty Maigh nEalta
- Town
- Location in Ireland
- Coordinates: 53°47′23″N 6°53′08″W
- Country: Ireland
- Province: Leinster
- County: County Meath
- Time zone: UTC+0 (WET)
  - Summer (DST): UTC-1 (IST (WEST))

Moynalty (Irish: Maigh nEalta, meaning 'the plain of the flocks') is a village in the north-west of County Meath in Ireland. It is located at the junction of the R194 and R164 regional roads 8 km (5 mi) north of Kells, near the border with County Cavan. It was part of the Kells Poor Law Union. The Borora river flows through the village. Its population in 2011 was 116 people. The village is in a townland and civil parish of the same name.

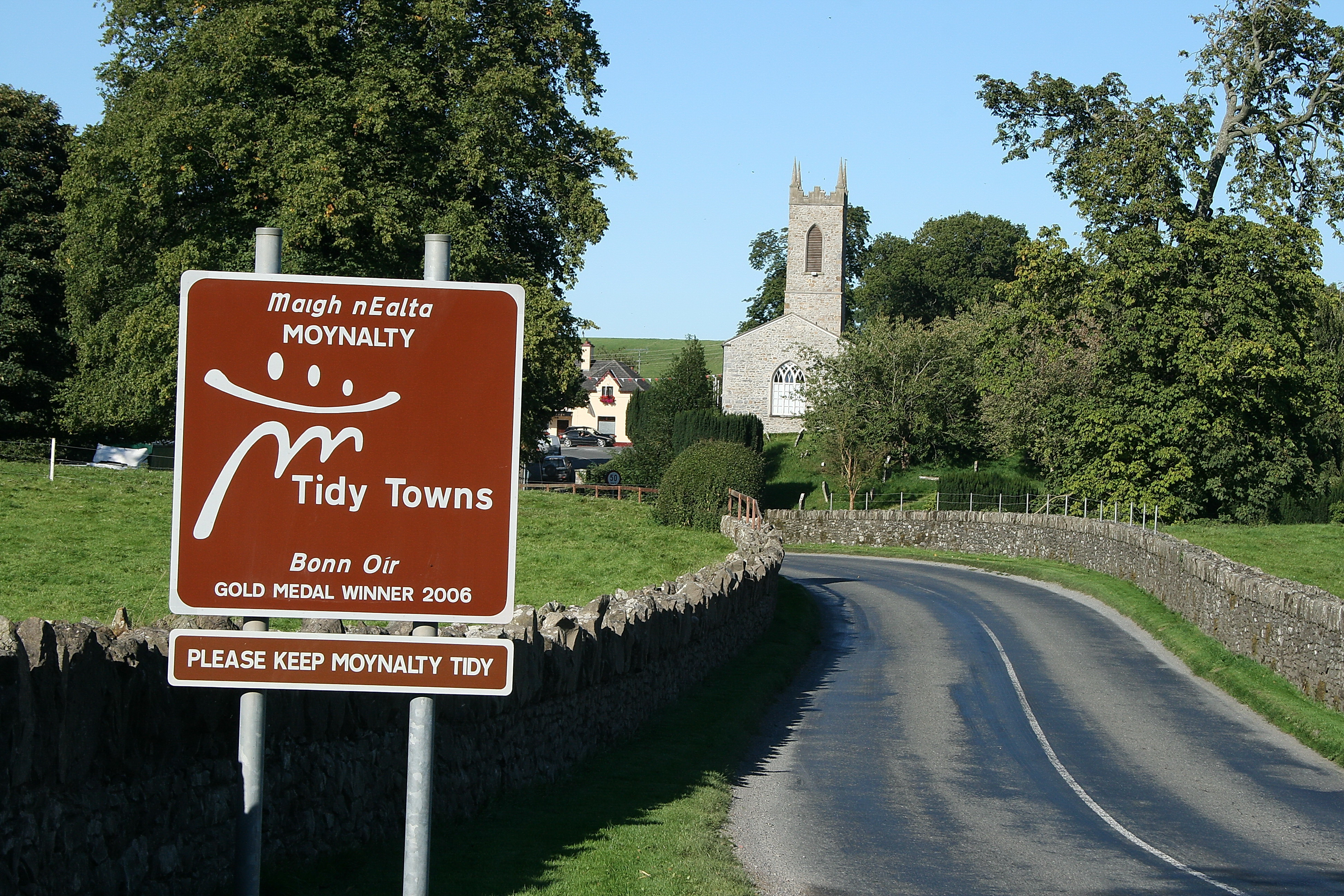
Tidy Towns Winner 2006

== Origins of the name ==
According to the Annals of the Four Masters, the name Mágh nEalta was introduced into Ireland about 2000 BC when Partholon, a Greek, gave that name to a treeless fertile plain in Dublin. Because the description also described its location, the area now known as Moynalty also got the name Magh nEalta. The name was initially used to describe the manorial lands and settlement in the area.

The Synod of Kells in 1152 restructured Catholicism in Ireland, replacing a monastic system of directing the Irish Church with a system of parishes, dioceses and archdioceses. As the old manorial village had embraced the name of the surrounding plain, the new parish assumed that name 'Magh n-Ealta' also.

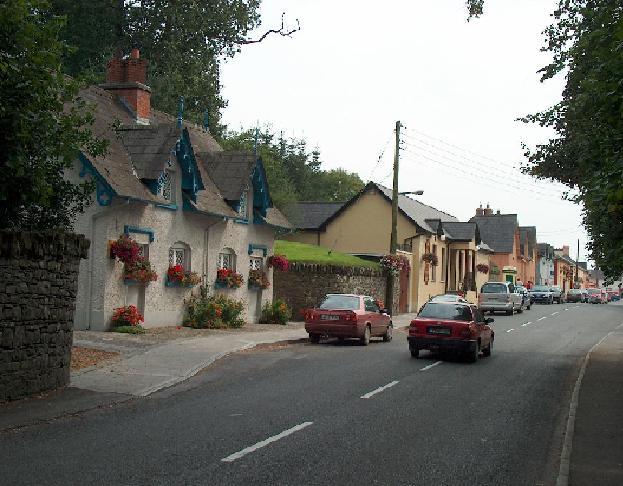
Moynalty in 2006

== Current village ==
The village was built by the grandson of James Farrell, who purchased the lands of Moynalty and its hinterland in 1790. That grandson, John Arthur, completed the building of Moynalty Village in 1837, and it is to some extent based on a Swiss design. The village was built on one side only earning it the saying "All To One Side Like The Village Of Moynalty". It was only after 1900 that houses were built on the river side of the village.

The Donore Hoard of bronze artifacts, a bronze chain, plates, and a door knocker, decorated in an 8th-century style, were discovered in the townland of Donore, Moynalty during an excavation in 1984. The items have been housed in the National Museum of Ireland since June 1985.

There was a small lace-making industry in Moynalty. This lace-making industry supplied Lace to the wife of King George at Buckingham Palace in London. The village has become a familiar face in the national Tidy Towns competition. Moynalty was awarded the title of Best Kept Town in All of Ireland in 2011. The village also hosts the Moynalty Steam Threshing festival, which has been held every August since 1975.

== Transport ==
Bus Éireann routes 108 and 186 provide 8 journeys a day (fewer on Sundays) to Kells and three journeys a day (one on Sundays) to Bailieborough in County Cavan via Mullagh Onward connections to Dublin and Dublin Airport are available at Kells.

== Notable people ==
- Matthew Gilsenan - Member of the Irish-based classical music group The Celtic Tenors was born in Moynalty in the early 1970s.
- Senator Patrick Lynch (1867–1944) - Born in Shearke, Moynalty in 1867.

== See also ==
- List of towns and villages in Ireland
