= Clankee =

Barony in County Cavan, Ireland

Clankee Clann Chaoich (Irish)
- Barony
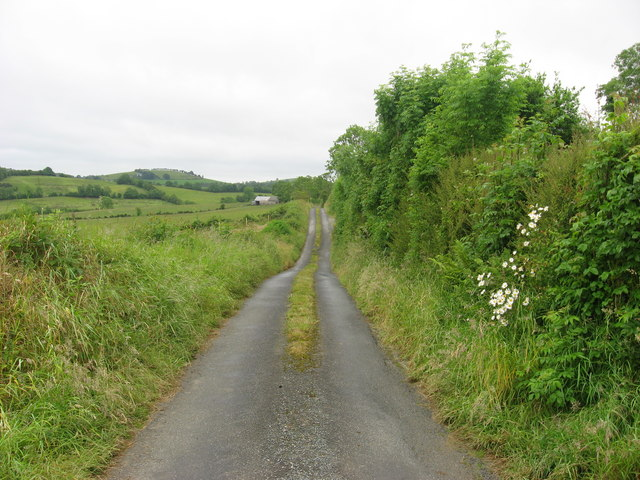
- Country road in Clankee

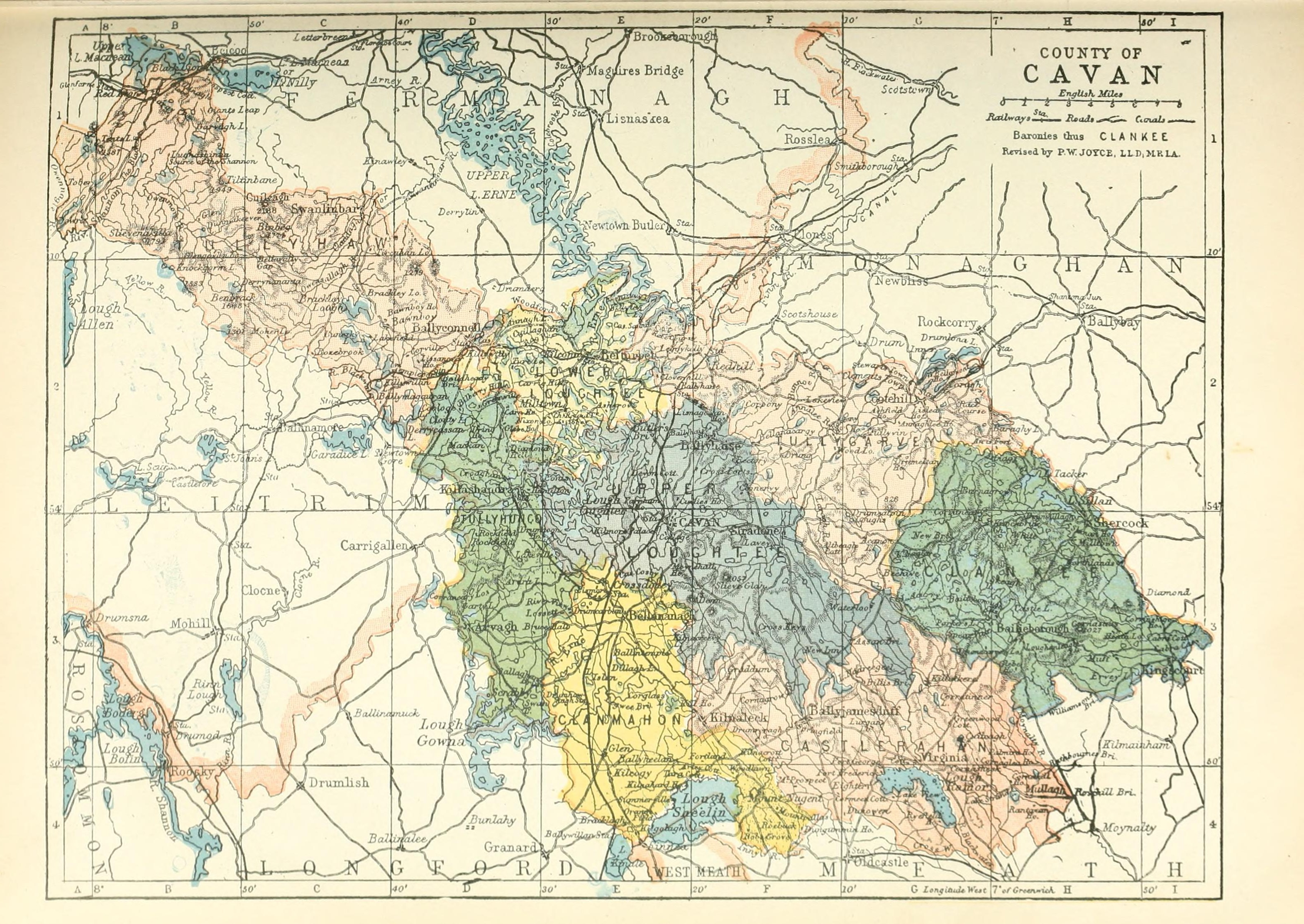
- Barony map of County Cavan, 1900; Clankee is in the east, coloured turquoise.
- Sovereign state: Ireland
- Province: Ulster
- County: Cavan

Area
  - Total: 260.52 km^{2} (100.59 sq mi)

Clankee (Irish: Clann Chaoich) is a barony in County Cavan, Ireland. Baronies were mainly cadastral rather than administrative units. They acquired modest local taxation and spending functions in the 19th century before being superseded by the Local Government (Ireland) Act 1898.

== Etymology ==
The barony name means "Clan (family) of the one-eyed"; cáech ("blind in one eye") was the nickname of the local Ua Raghallaigh (O'Reilly) chieftain Niall O'Reilly, son of Cathal na Beithí, son of Annadh Ó Raghallaigh (died 1256).

The barony also is recorded under the name Clann Chaoich an Fheadha (Clankee of the lengths), Clann Chaoich Uachtarach (“Upper Clankee”) or Clann Chaoich na Seanchlainne (Clankee of the old family).

== Geography ==
Clankee is the easternmost part of County Cavan, mostly woods, drumlins, lakes and bogs, bordering on County Monaghan and County Meath.

== History ==
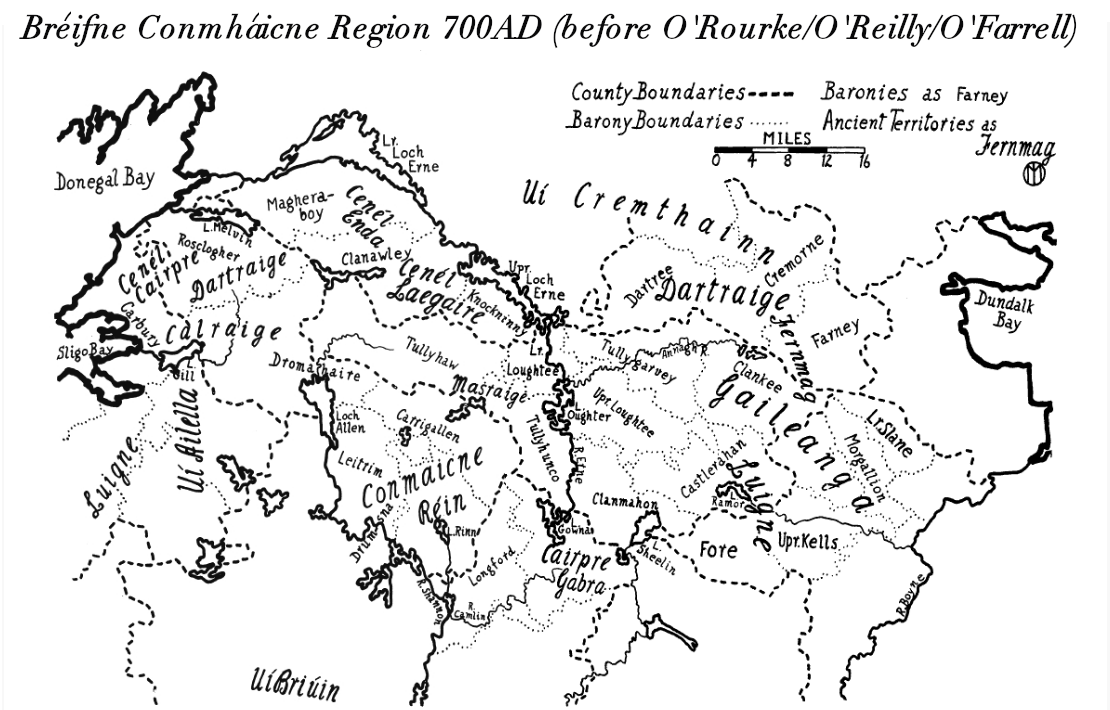
Map of Breifne in AD 700; Clankee is seen near to the "Gailenga" tribe.

Clankee was formerly part of the territory of the Gailenga Móra. The MacTullys, McGargans, O’Clerys and O’Coyles were powerful families in the area. In 1471, a battle between the O’Reilly's and the O’Farrell's took place at Clankee in which the O’Reilly commander was killed and the Chief O’Farrell was taken prisoner.

The barony of Clankee was created by 1609 in the Plantation of Ulster; it was archaically spelled Clonky.

== List of settlements ==
Below is a list of settlements in Clankee:

- Bailieborough
- Canningstown
- Kingscourt
- Shercock
