= R194 road (Ireland) =

Road in Ireland

R194 road
- Bóthar R194
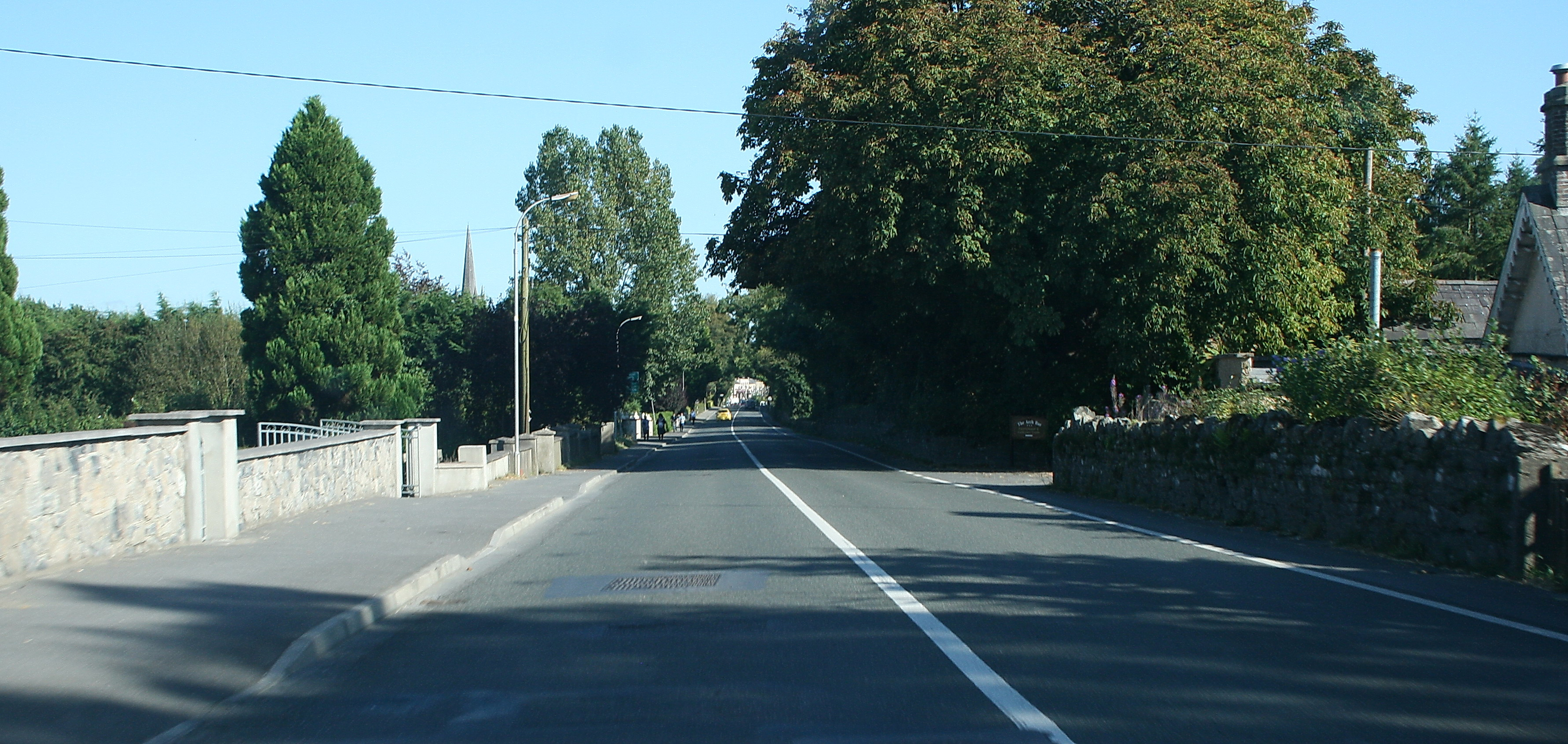
- R194 in Virginia

Route information
- Length: 67 km (42 mi)

Location
- Country: Ireland
- Primary destinations: County Longford; Longford - leave at roundabout junction with N4 and N63; Killoe; Edgeworthstown; Drumlish; Ballinalee; Granard - join/leave the N55; (R396); County Cavan; Join/leave the R394; passes Lough Sheelin; Join/leave the R154; Ballyjamesduff - (R196); (R195); Virginia joins the N3; (R178); leave the N3; Mullagh - (R191); 'County Meath; Moynalty - terminates at the R164

Highway system
- Roads in Ireland; Motorways; Primary; Secondary; Regional
← R193	→ R195

The R194 road is a regional road in Ireland linking Longford in County Longford to Virginia in County Cavan to Moynalty in County Meath. The road is 67 km (42 mi) long.

== See also ==
- Roads in Ireland
- National primary road
- National secondary road
