= R165 road (Ireland) =

Road in Ireland

R165 road
- Bóthar R165
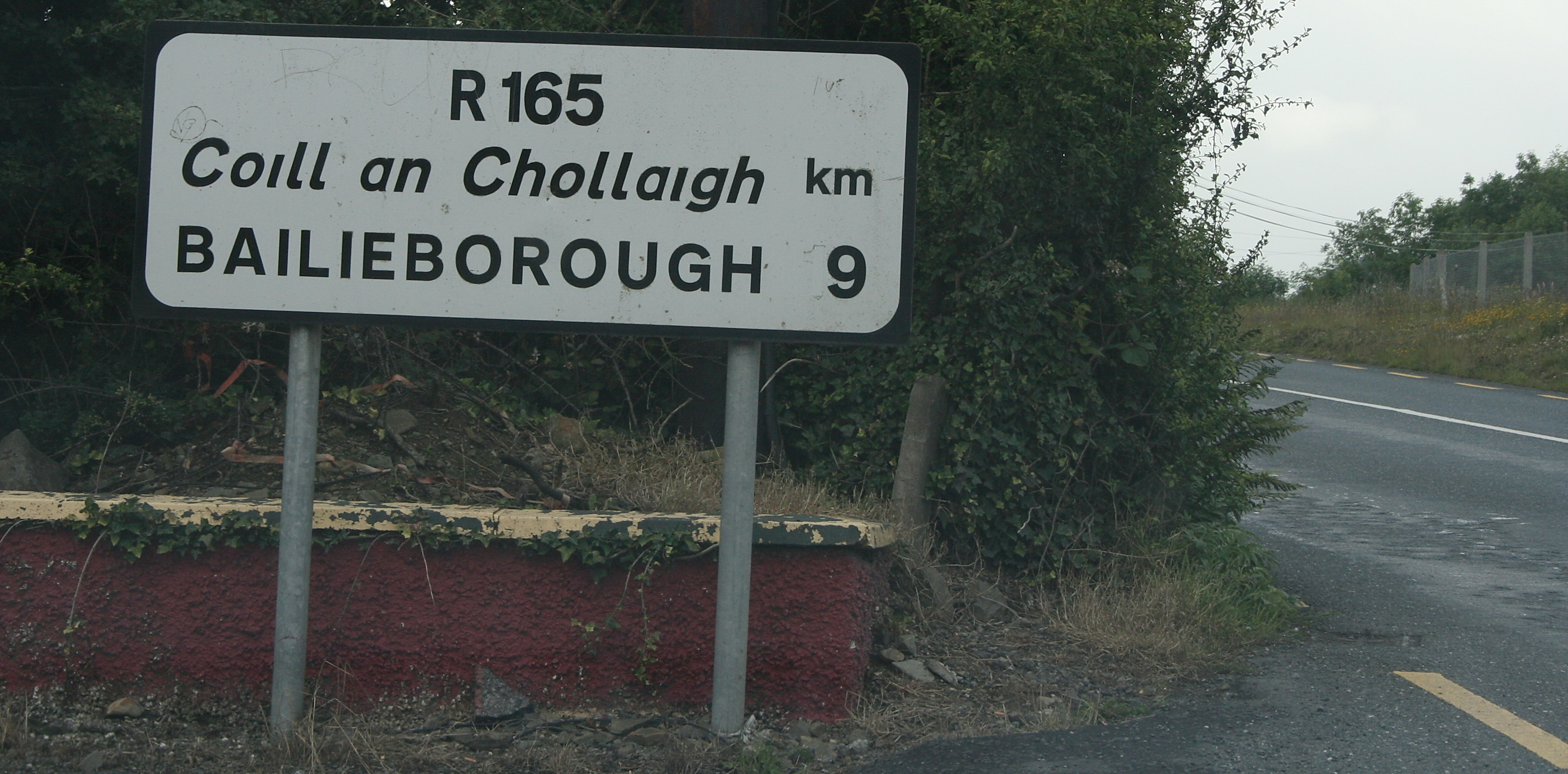
- R165 at Lavey

Route information
- Length: 64 km (40 mi)

Location
- Country: Ireland
- Primary destinations: County Cavan; Starts at junction with the R188; Stradone; Joins/leaves N3 at Lavey; Joins the R191; Bailieborough - (R178); leaves the R191; Kingscourt - (R162); (R164); (R179); Drumcondrath; (N52); County Louth; Terminates at the N2 near Ardee

Highway system
- Roads in Ireland; Motorways; Primary; Secondary; Regional

The R165 road is a regional road in Ireland, linking the R188 5 km (3.1 mi) west of Cootehill in County Cavan to the N2 near Ardee, County Louth.

The route is 64 km (40 mi) long.

== Route ==
Northeast to southwest, the route starts at a junction with the R188 west of Cootehill. It continues southwards through Stradone, to join the N3 and in 500 m leaves the N3 at Lavey.

It heads southeast through Bailieborough, Kingscourt and Drumconrath, crosses the N52 then enters County Louth and terminates at the N2 3 km (1.9 mi) south of Ardee.

== See also ==
- Roads in Ireland
- National primary road
- National secondary road
