= Kingscourt =

Town in County Cavan, Ireland

Kingscourt Dún an Rí
- Town
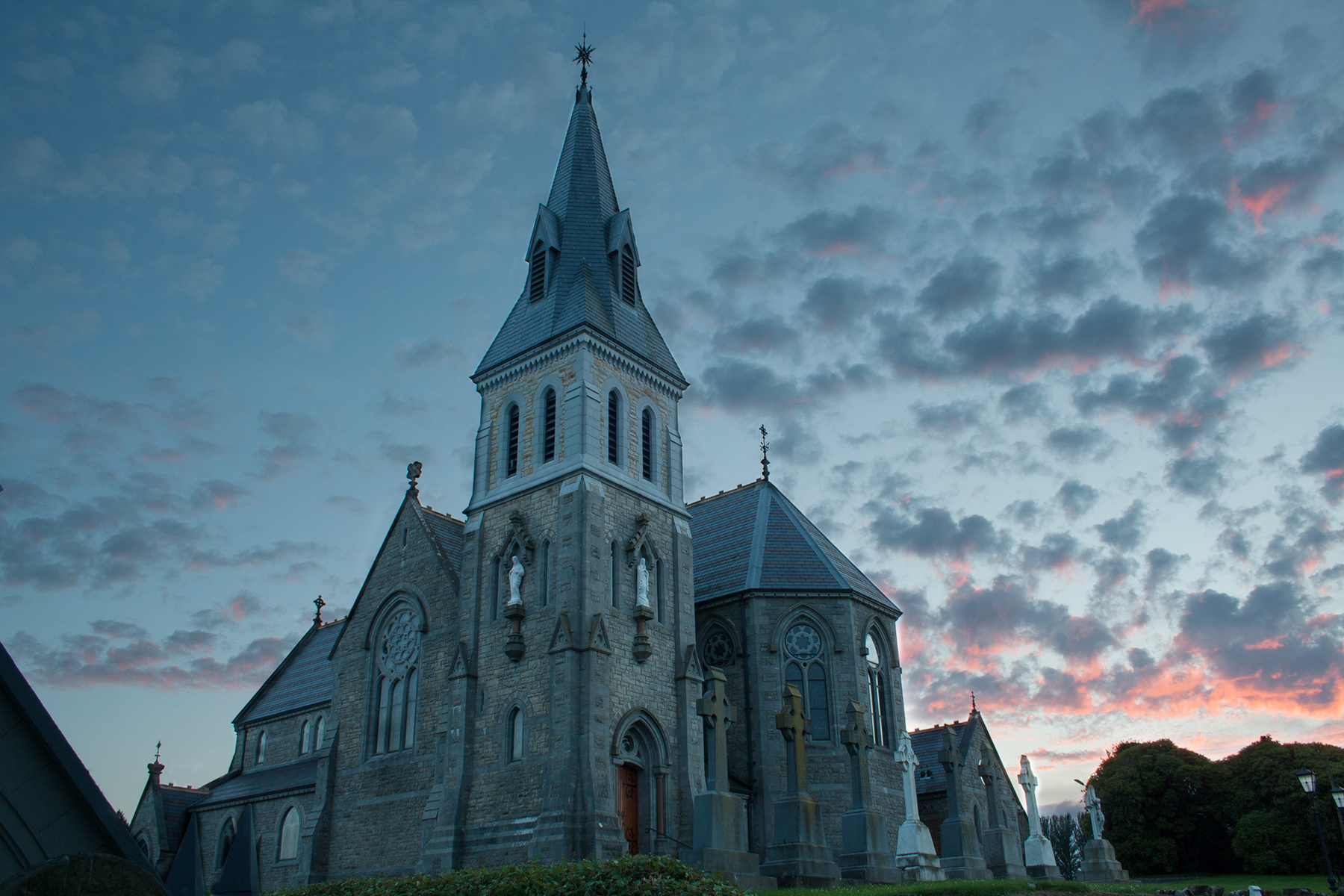
- Church of the Immaculate Conception

- Location in Ireland
- Coordinates: 53°54′17″N 6°48′18″W
- Country: Ireland
- Province: Ulster
- County: County Cavan

Population (2022)
  - Total: 2,955
- Time zone: UTC±0 (WET)
  - Summer (DST): UTC+1 (IST)
- Eircode routing key: A82
- Telephone area code: +353(0)42
- Irish Grid Reference: N787958

Kingscourt, historically known as Dunaree (Irish: Dún an Rí, meaning 'fort of the king'), is a town in County Cavan, Ireland. It is located near the Cavan–Meath border. The town was founded near the site of the old village of Cabra, by Mervyn Pratt, towards the end of the 18th century, and was completed by his brother, the Reverend Joseph Pratt. As of the 2022 census, the population was 2,955.

== History ==
Historical population
Year	Pop.	±%
1926	616	—
1936	631	+2.4%
1946	550	−12.8%
1951	548	−0.4%
1956	807	+47.3%
1961	793	−1.7%
1966	842	+6.2%
1971	1,437	+70.7%
1979	1,769	+23.1%
1981	1,768	−0.1%
1986	1,816	+2.7%
1991	1,797	−1.0%
1996	1,876	+4.4%
2002	2,019	+7.6%
2006	2,580	+27.8%
2011	2,326	−9.8%
2016	2,499	+7.4%
2022	2,955	+18.2%

Cabra Castle, an early 19th-century 'Gothic-style' castle, is located very near the town, being on the R179 road (known locally as the Carrickmacross Road). The castle was originally called Cormey Castle and was built on the site of an earlier Cormey Castle which had been destroyed during the Cromwellian War. The castle has, in recent years, been restored and expanded and is now a four-star hotel.

The first significant evangelical action by The Irish Society for Promoting the Education of the Native Irish through the Medium of Their Own Language was in Kingscourt, in 1822 by Rev. Robert Winning, supported by the local landlord Baron Farnham.

== Architecture ==
The local Catholic church, which is perched high above the town, contains stained glass windows by the renowned Irish artist Evie Hone, who also provided designs for Eton College Chapel. The local Church of Ireland, St. Ernan's, Lisasturrin, Enniskeen, Kingscourt Parish, a gothic revival church built c. 1780, has the stained glass Four Evangelists' window (1864), originally in St. Jude's, Dublin, from the William Wailes studio Newcastle-upon-Tyne.

== Economy ==
Building supplies company Kingspan is headquartered in the town. The company was founded in 1965 and initially known as Kingscourt Construction Group. Kingspan is now a constituent company on the Dublin stock market's ISEQ 20 index.

== Environment ==
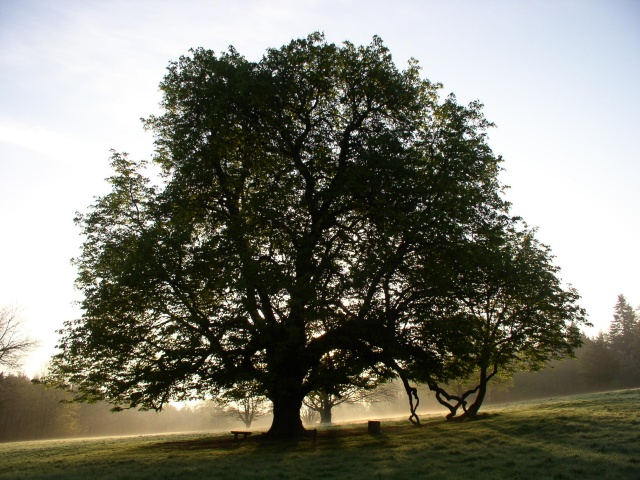
Dún na Rí Forest Park

Dún na Rí Forest Park is located a couple of kilometers from Kingscourt. Situated in a valley, and formerly part of the Pratt family's Cabra Estate (which was centered on nearby Cabra Castle), Dún na Rí is home to stoat, hare, mink, rabbit and otter, as well as red and grey squirrel along the banks of the River Cabra. The park itself borders the Shercock and Carrickmacross roads. The original Cabra House (also sometimes known as Cabra Castle) was located within the modern forest park. The Pratt dynasty moved into the current Cabra Castle (which is just across the Carrickmacross Road from the forest park's main entrance) in 1813.

== Transport ==
=== Railway ===
Kingscourt has a railway line which has been disused following strike action by Iarnród Éireann train drivers in 2001. The line ceased to have passenger services in 1947, and was then a freight-only service. The line, which runs from Kingscourt to Navan and then on to Drogheda, was used to carry gypsum ore daily from Gypsum Industries, but the company withdrew this service when Iarnród Éireann could not guarantee deliveries of Gypsum ore, and was consequently transferred to road transport in 2001.This former railway has been redeveloped as a greenway and links Kingscourt to Navan.

=== Road ===
Kingscourt is situated on the R162 regional road where it connects with the R164, R165 and R179. The town is approximately 30 minutes drive from the M1 motorway, via Ardee, County Louth, providing easy access to Dublin Airport (95 km), Dublin city and its environs (90 km), Drogheda (50 km), Dundalk (35 km) and Belfast (130 km).

=== Bus ===
There are daily bus connections to Nobber, Navan and Dublin with both Sillan Tours Limited and Bus Éireann. On Tuesdays and Thursdays Bus Éireann route 166 provides a link to Cavan via Bailieborough and Stradone, County Cavan. Royal Breffni Tours operate a twice-daily service from Kingscourt to Dundalk IT.

== Sport ==
The Racquetball Association of Ireland is based in Kingscourt and the 14th IRF Racquetball World Championships took place in the town in 2008. Held every two years, previous championships were held in the Dominican Republic (2006), South Korea (2004) and Puerto Rico (2002). The Kingscourt Handball and Racquetball court complex is the largest in Ireland with three 40x20s and one 60x30 court. Kingscourt Handball Club is home to a number of All-Ireland champions, and the club have won the Senior All-Ireland Club title twice; once in 2001 and again in 2003.

In Gaelic football, the Kingscourt Stars are the fourth most successful club in the county having won the Cavan Senior Football Championship eleven times, most recently in 2015.

== Education ==
Schools in the area include Coláiste Dún an Rí, a co-educational secondary school opened in August 2016, Cabra Central National School, a co-educational national school opened in 1978, and St Joseph's National School, a co-educational national school originally opened in April 1953, though expanded to its current building in June 1984.

== Notable people ==
- Shane Connaughton (born 1941), Irish writer and actor
- Eugene Murtagh (born 1942), billionaire businessman, founder and chairman of Kingspan Group
- Victor Sherlock, Gaelic football player for Meath and Cavan

== See also ==
- List of towns and villages in Ireland
