= Clanmahon =

Barony in County Cavan, Ireland

Clanmahon Clann Mhathúna (Irish)
- Barony
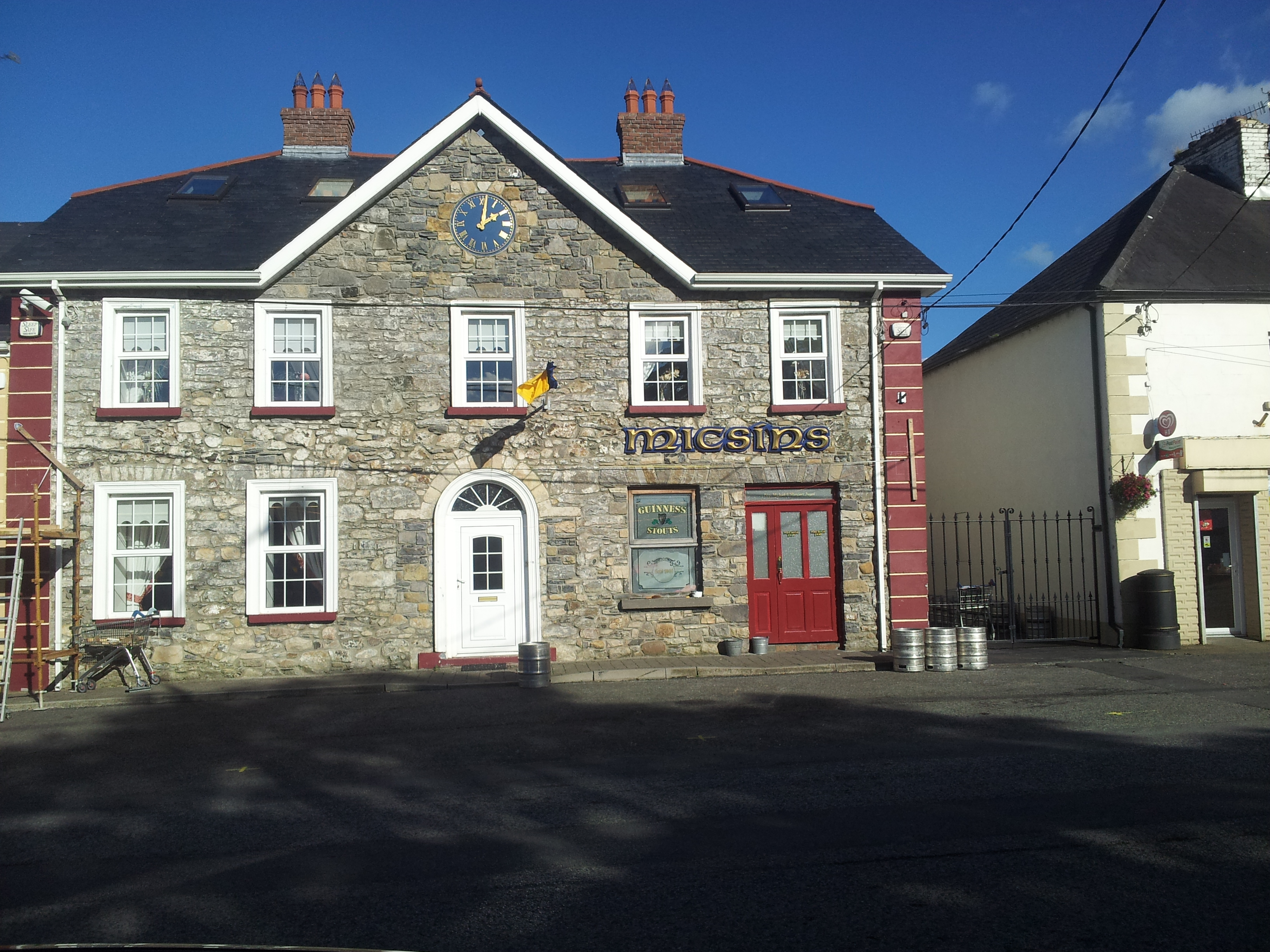
- Pub in Kilcogy, Clanmahon

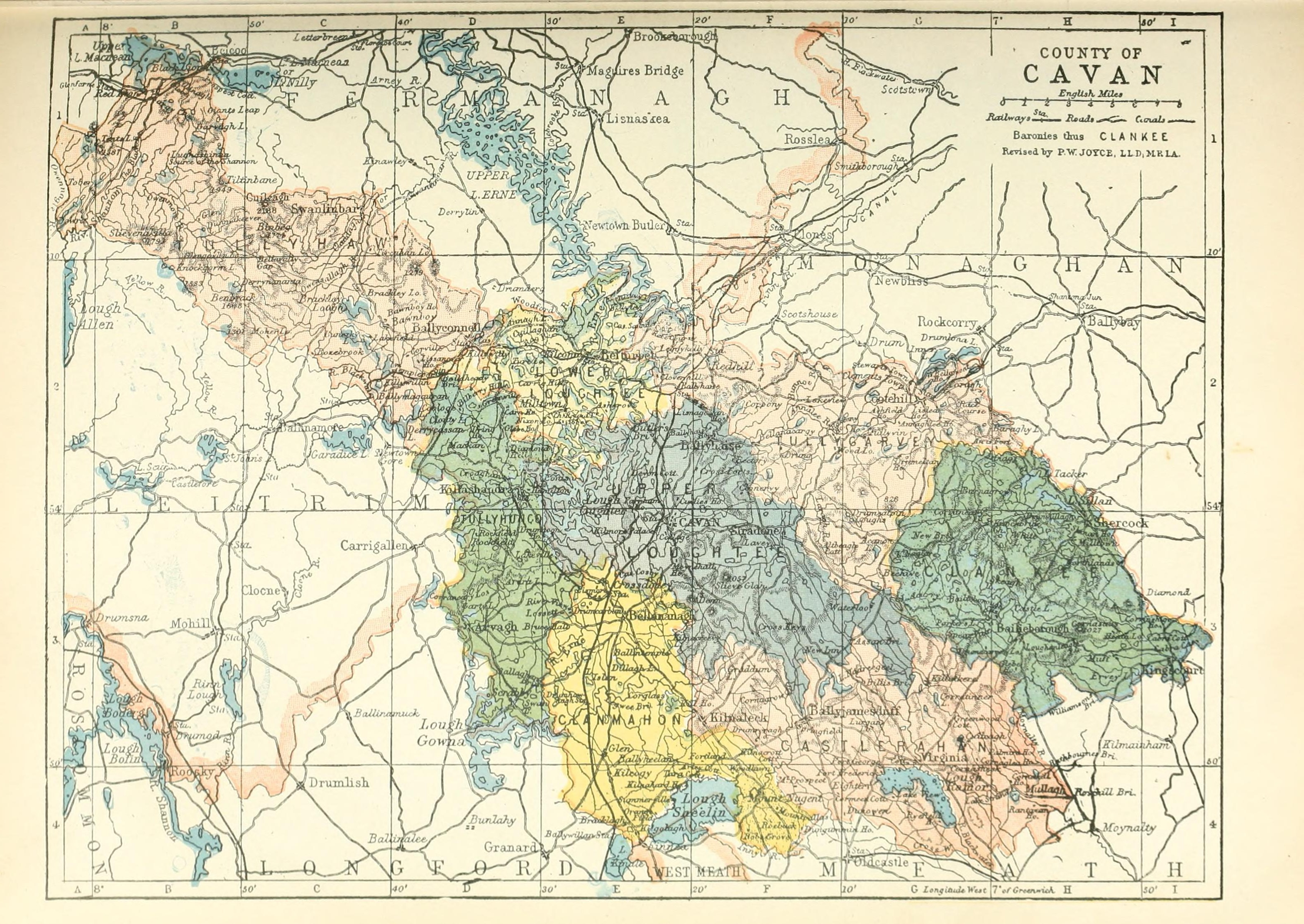
- Barony map of County Cavan, 1900; Clanmahon is in the south, coloured yellow.
- Sovereign state: Ireland
- Province: Ulster
- County: Cavan

Area
  - Total: 207.08 km^{2} (79.95 sq mi)

Clanmahon (Irish: Clann Mhathúna) is a barony in County Cavan, Ireland. Baronies were mainly cadastral rather than administrative units. They acquired modest local taxation and spending functions in the 19th century before being superseded by the Local Government (Ireland) Act 1898.

== Etymology ==
Clanmahon takes its name from the Irish Clann Mathúna, originally Cloinne Mathghamhna, "Mathgamhain's tribe," the ruling Gaelic Irish dynasty in the area in the Middle Ages. The personal name Mathgamhain means "bear" and was a common name among warriors.

== Geography ==
Clanmahon is the southern part of County Cavan, east of the River Erne and north of Lough Sheelin.

== History ==
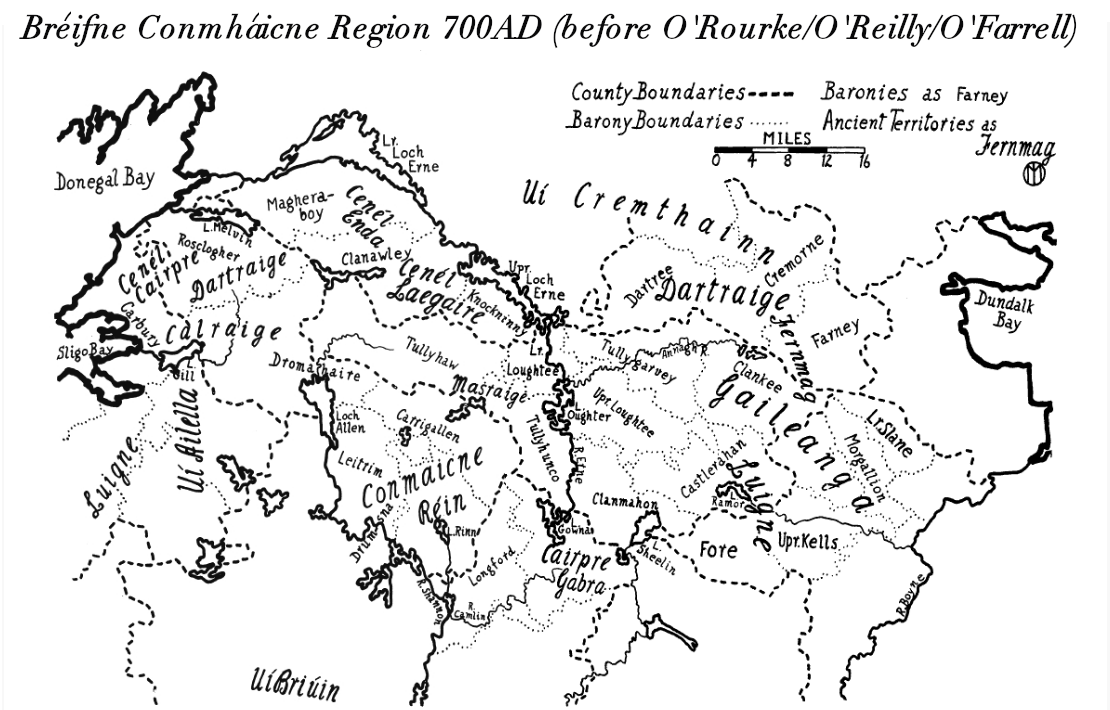
Map of Breifne in AD 700; Clanmahon is seen near to the "Cairpre Gabra" tribe.

The descendants of Tomas Mór O'Reilly, king of East Breifne 1384–92, were rulers of Clanmahon in the 15th century; Tomás was the son of Mathgamain Ua Raighillaigh. The Uí Shioradáin (O'Sheridans) were a vassal tribe. The Ua Raghallaigh (O'Reillys) were also powerful landowners until the 16th century. According to the Annals of the Four Masters, in 1537, "The son of O'Reilly (Brian, the son of Farrell), a great loss in his own country, was slain by the people of the English Lord Justice [Leonard Grey, 1st Viscount Grane], who came to commit ravages in Clann-Mahon."

The barony of Clanmahon was created by 1609 in the Plantation of Ulster.

Clanmahon gives its name to Clanmahon Road, Donnycarney, Dublin; several streets in that area are named after Irish clans.

== List of settlements ==
Below is a list of settlements in Clanmahon:

- Ballinagh
- Crossdoney
- Crosserlough
- Kilcogy
- Mountnugent
