= R179 road (Ireland) =

Regional road in Ireland

R179 road
- Bóthar R179
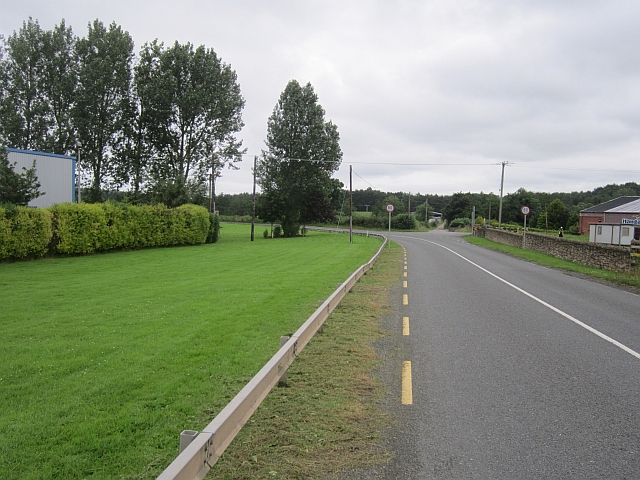
- Carrickmacross Road, Kingscourt, on the R179

Route information
- Length: 23.9 km (14.9 mi)

Location
- Country: Ireland
- Primary destinations: County Cavan; leaves the R165 at Kingscourt; County Monaghan; crosses the R178 at Carrickmacross; crosses the N2 at Coolderry Lower; Terminates at the Republic of Ireland–United Kingdom border at Cullaville

Highway system
- Roads in Ireland; Motorways; Primary; Secondary; Regional

The R179 road is a regional road in Ireland linking Kingscourt in County Cavan and the Republic of Ireland–United Kingdom border in County Monaghan. The road passes through the villages of Magheracloone, Knocknacran, and the town of Carrickmacross. The road is 23.9 km (14.9 mi) long.

== See also ==
- Roads in Ireland
- National primary road
- National secondary road
