= R164 road (Ireland) =

Regional road in Ireland

R164 road
- Bóthar R164
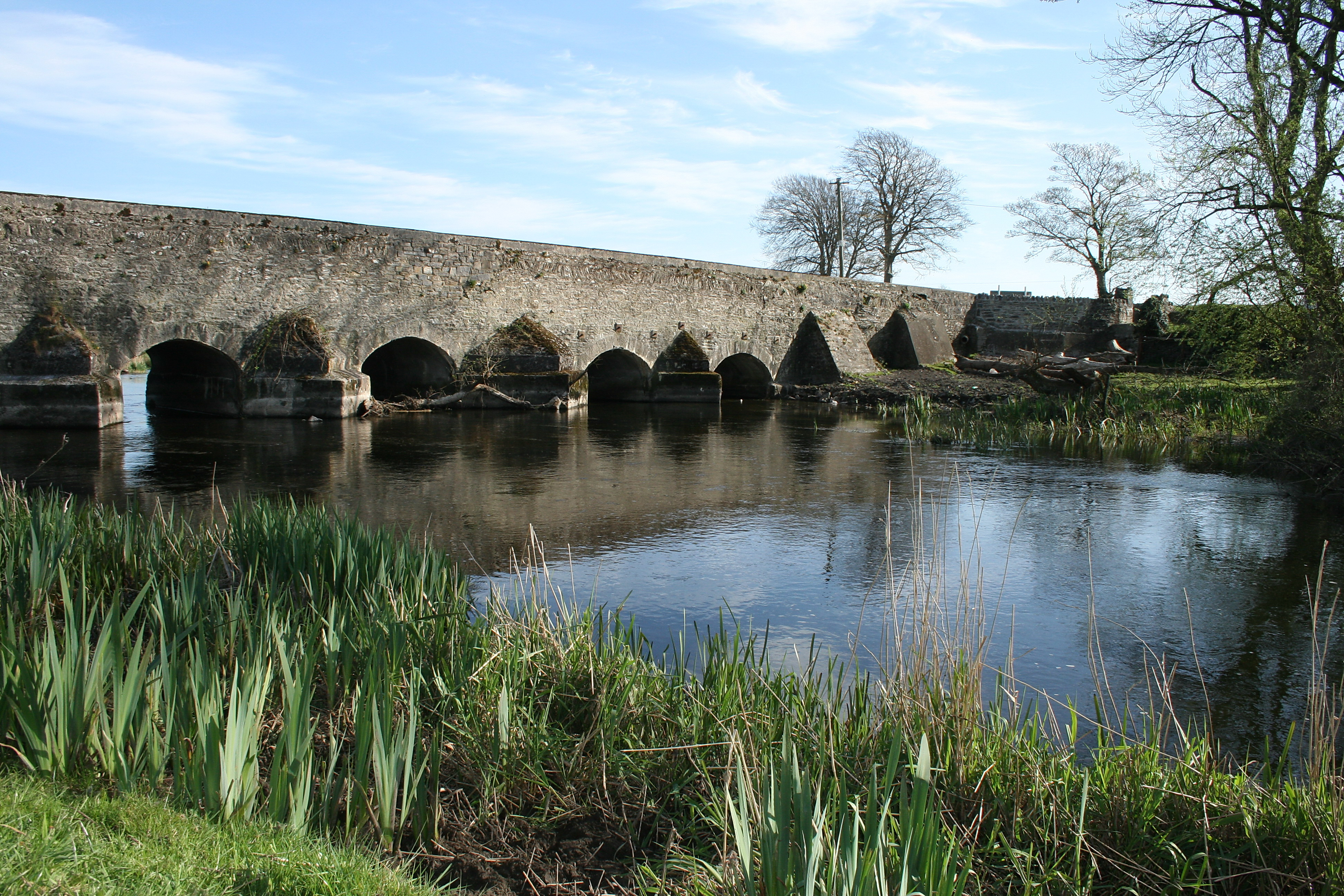
- R164 crosses the Blackwater near Kells

Route information
- Length: 36 km (22 mi)

Location
- Country: Ireland
- Primary destinations: County Cavan; Kingscourt - (R162), (R165); County Meath; Boggan Cross Roads; Moynalty - (R194); Crosses the River Blackwater; Kells joins R147 then N52, leaves N52; Scurlockstown; Fordstown; Terminates at the N51 near Athboy

Highway system
- Roads in Ireland; Motorways; Primary; Secondary; Regional

The R164 road is a regional road in Ireland, linking Kingscourt in County Cavan to the N51 near Athboy, County Meath.

== Route ==
North to South the route starts in Kingscourt, County Cavan and in 2 km crosses into County Meath. It continues southwards through Moynalty, across the Kells Blackwater river and into Kells.

In Kells it joins the R147 at Carrick Street and continues through Castle Street; turns into the N52 at Cross Street; continues through Farrell Street and Bective Street before leaving the N52 and heading south along Rockfield Street.

It leaves Kells south through Scurlockstown and Fordstown before terminating at the N51 3 km east of Athboy.

== See also ==
- Roads in Ireland
- National primary road
- National secondary road
