= Mullagh, County Cavan =

Town in County Cavan, Ireland

Mullagh An Mullach
- Town
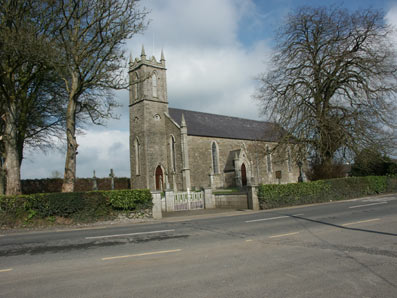
- St. Kilian's Catholic Church

- Location in Ireland
- Coordinates: 53°48′42″N 6°56′55″W
- Country: Ireland
- Province: Ulster
- County: County Cavan
- Elevation: 107 m (351 ft)

Population (2022)
  - Total: 1,651
- Time zone: UTC±0 (WET)
  - Summer (DST): UTC+1 (IST)
- Eircode routing key: A82
- Telephone area code: +353(0)42
- Irish Grid Reference: N690852
- Website: www.mullagh.ie

Mullagh (/ˈmʊlæ/; Irish: An Mullach, meaning 'the hilltop') is a town, civil parish and townland in County Cavan, Ireland. As of the 2022 census, the town's population was 1,651. It lies in the south-east of the county, at the junction of the R191 and the R194 regional roads near the towns of Virginia and Bailieborough.

== St Kilian and churches ==
The town has a heritage centre dedicated to St Kilian, who was born in Mullagh c. 640 and was martyred in Würzburg in Franconia in northern Bavaria, Germany, in c. 689. The centre also has an exhibition related to ogham script and the development of illuminated manuscripts.

The Catholic church, a Victorian neo-Gothic structure located 400 m from the village on the Virginia Road (R194), is named in memory of its patron, Saint Kilian. It was built in the late 1850s. Ruins of an earlier church, known as Teampeall Ceallaigh, remain in what is now part of the Church of Ireland grounds located approximately 600 m along the same road.

== Development ==
Mullagh's population increased substantially between the 2006 and 2022 census. The 2006 census recorded 679 residents, rising to 1,651 by the time of the 2022 census.

There was substantial housing and industrial development in the environs of the village in this period. Mullagh's relative proximity to the new M3 motorway has made Dublin more accessible to Mullagh and County Cavan.

== Amenities ==
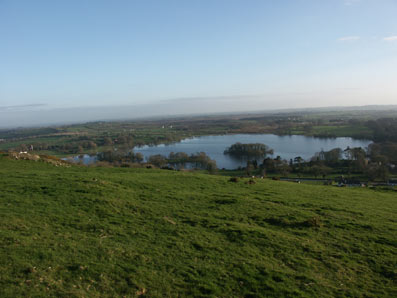
Mullagh Lake seen from Mullagh Hill

Local amenities include Mullagh Lake and Hill Walk (2 kilometers outside the village on the Virginia Road), a tennis court and park on Mullagh Fair Green, and a children's playground beside the St. Kilian's Heritage Center. The Edwin Carolan Memorial Park has a full-size GAA pitch (open to all sports), a 440-metre track around its perimeter and a multi-purpose sports centre and gym. In the winter, the track is floodlit at night-time to facilitate walking and running.

== Community organisations ==
Local community organisations include a men's and ladies' Gaelic Athletic Association (GAA) club (Cúchulainns GFC), a community games (athletics) club, a drama society, a golf society, friendship club, parent and toddler group, Girl Guides and Boy Scouts.

Local committees include the Mullagh Tourism & Community Development Committee, Mullagh Tidy Towns, and St. Kilian's Housing Association.

== Transport ==
Mullagh is served by the Local Link route 186 bus service, from Cavan to Baile Ghib, County Meath.

== Events ==
Mullagh Fair Day was one of the biggest fairs in the North East, and its proximity to the Virginia Road railway station ensured that cattle purchased in Mullagh could easily be transported to ports in Dublin and Drogheda. However, the opening of the Mullagh mart in 1957 finally brought to a close a long chapter in the history of Mullagh since the first charters and licences were granted in 1621.

The Mullagh Tourism & Community Development Committee re-established the Fair Day in 1997, and it has since grown to be one of the largest one-day shows in the North East. The fair takes place each year on the 2nd Sunday in September.

== Historic associations ==
The V. Rev. Dr Jonathan Swift, Dean of St. Patrick's Cathedral in Dublin, wrote parts of Gulliver's Travels and The Tale Of The Tub whilst staying near Mullagh (He is said to have taken inspiration for Gulliver and the Brobdingnagians from a tall local farmer nicknamed 'Big Doughty' when he saw the farmer lifting a large calf over a gate.) Dean Swift was staying at the country home of his cleric friend The Rev. Thomas Sheridan at Quilca House close to the historic location of the original Mullagh village. Other notable descendants from the (Quilca) Sheridan family are the 18th century playwright Thomas Sheridan and the writer Richard Brinsley Sheridan.

The original historic village of Mullagh was situated over a kilometre north-west of the present village close to Mullagh Lake, just off the Virginia Road, but there no longer remain any distinguishing features except the name of the crossroads at the foot of Mullagh Hill which are still called 'The Gates Of Old Mullagh'

== People ==
- Henry Brooke (1703–1783), novelist and dramatist, was born and raised at Rantavan House, very near Mullagh.
- T. P. McKenna, television actor (All Creatures Great and Small, Inspector Morse)
- Brían F. O'Byrne, film, television and stage actor (Intermission, Brooklyn's Finest, Million Dollar Baby, FlashForward, Prime Suspect, Love/Hate)
- Agnes O'Farrelly, professor, novelist, founder of Cumann na mBan, 4th President of the Camogie Association and Irish Language Scholar born at Raffony, Crossreagh, Mullagh near the parish border with Lurgan.
- Saint Kilian, Irish missionary to the Franks of Würzburg. Born in a fort in Cloghballybeg, The Gates, Mullagh in 640 A.D. Martyred in 689 in Franconia. Patron saint of Rheumatism.

== See also ==
- List of towns and villages in Ireland
