= R195 road (Ireland) =

Regional road in Ireland

R195 road
- Bóthar R195
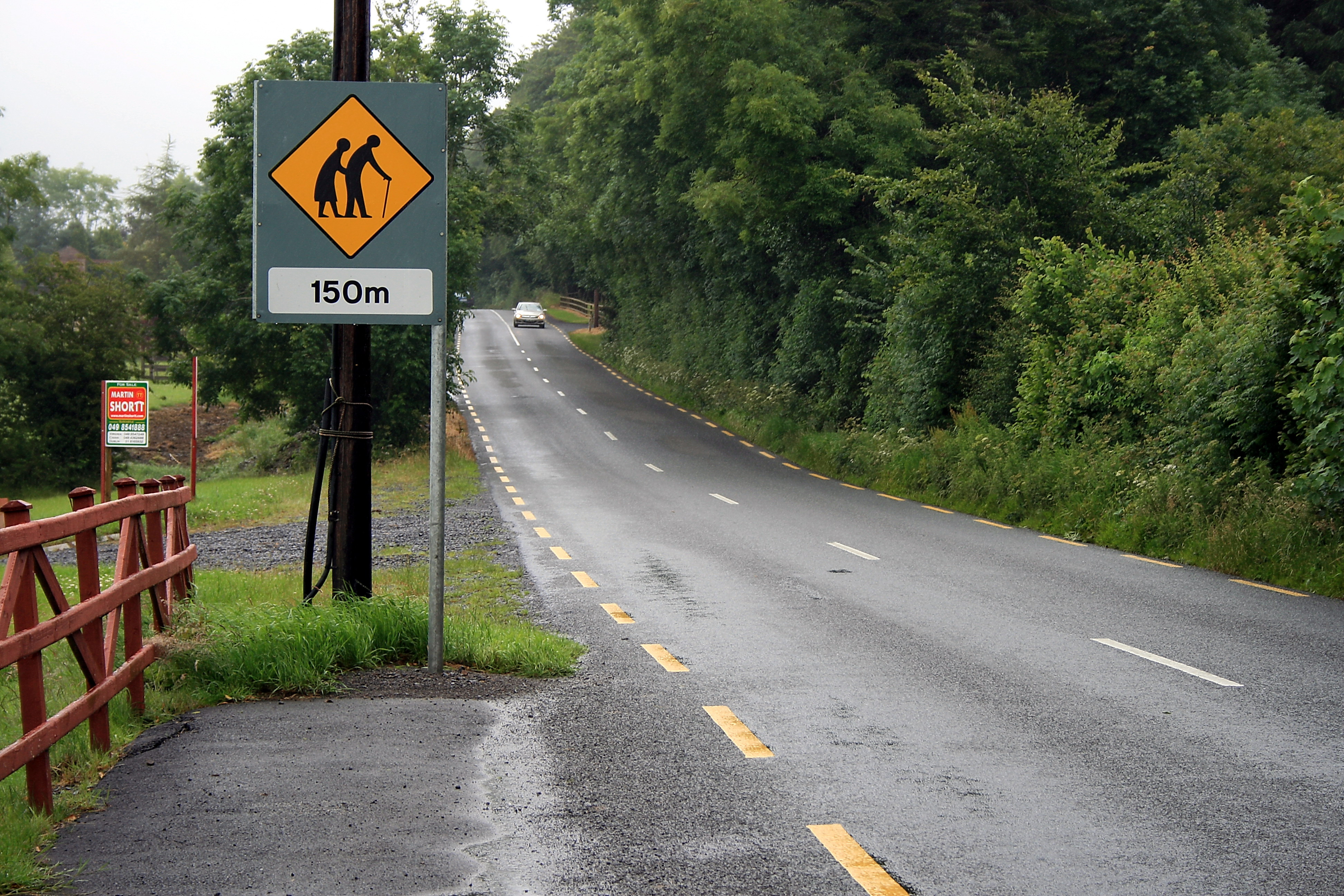
- R195 near Virginia

Route information
- Length: 26 km (16 mi)

Location
- Country: Ireland
- Primary destinations: County Westmeath; Castlepollard - leave junction with R394, R395; Passes 2 km from the village of Fore; County Meath; Oldcastle - (R154); County Cavan; Eighter - passes Lough Ramor; Terminates near Virginia, County Cavan at junction with the R194

Highway system
- Roads in Ireland; Motorways; Primary; Secondary; Regional

The R195 road is a regional road in Ireland linking Castlepollard in County Westmeath to Virginia in County Cavan. It passes through the town of Oldcastle, County Meath and several villages and hamlets en route. The road is 26 km (16 mi) long.

== See also ==
- Roads in Ireland
- National primary road
- National secondary road
