= Cannings Town =

Cannings Town may refer to:

- Canningstown, a village in County Cavan, Ireland
- Canning Town, an area of London
