= R394 road (Ireland) =

Road in Ireland

R394 road
- Bóthar R394
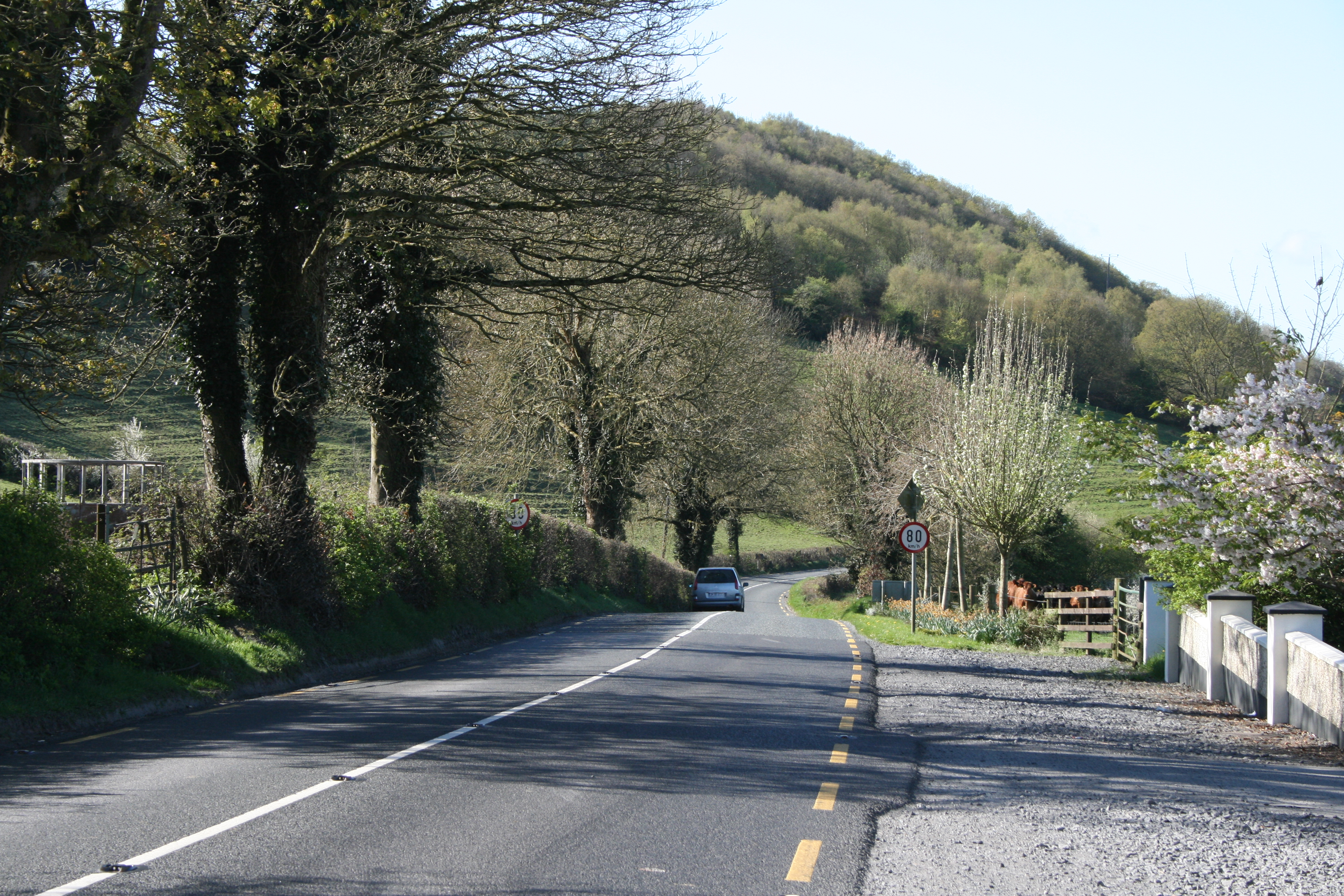
- R394 near Crookedwood

Route information
- Length: 41 km (25 mi)

Location
- Country: Ireland
- Primary destinations: County Cavan; Leaves the N55; Kilcogy; R194; County Westmeath; Finnea; Castlepollard – R195, R395; Crosses the Yellow River; Crookedwood; Monilea; Knockdrin; Crosses over the N4 at grade separated junction; Terminates in Mullingar town centre

Highway system
- Roads in Ireland; Motorways; Primary; Secondary; Regional

The R394 road is a regional road in Ireland linking the N55 in County Cavan to Mullingar in County Westmeath. It passes through the town of Castlepollard and several villages and hamlets en route.

The road is 41 km (25 mi) long.

== See also ==
- Roads in Ireland
- National primary road
- National secondary road
