= Adrian Martin =

Adrian Martin may refer to:

- Adrian Martin (film critic) (born 1959), Australian film and arts critic
- Adrian Martin (chef) (born 1991), Irish chef

== See also ==
- Adrián Martín (disambiguation)
