= Dún na Rí Forest Park =

Park on the Cavan-Monaghan county border, Ireland

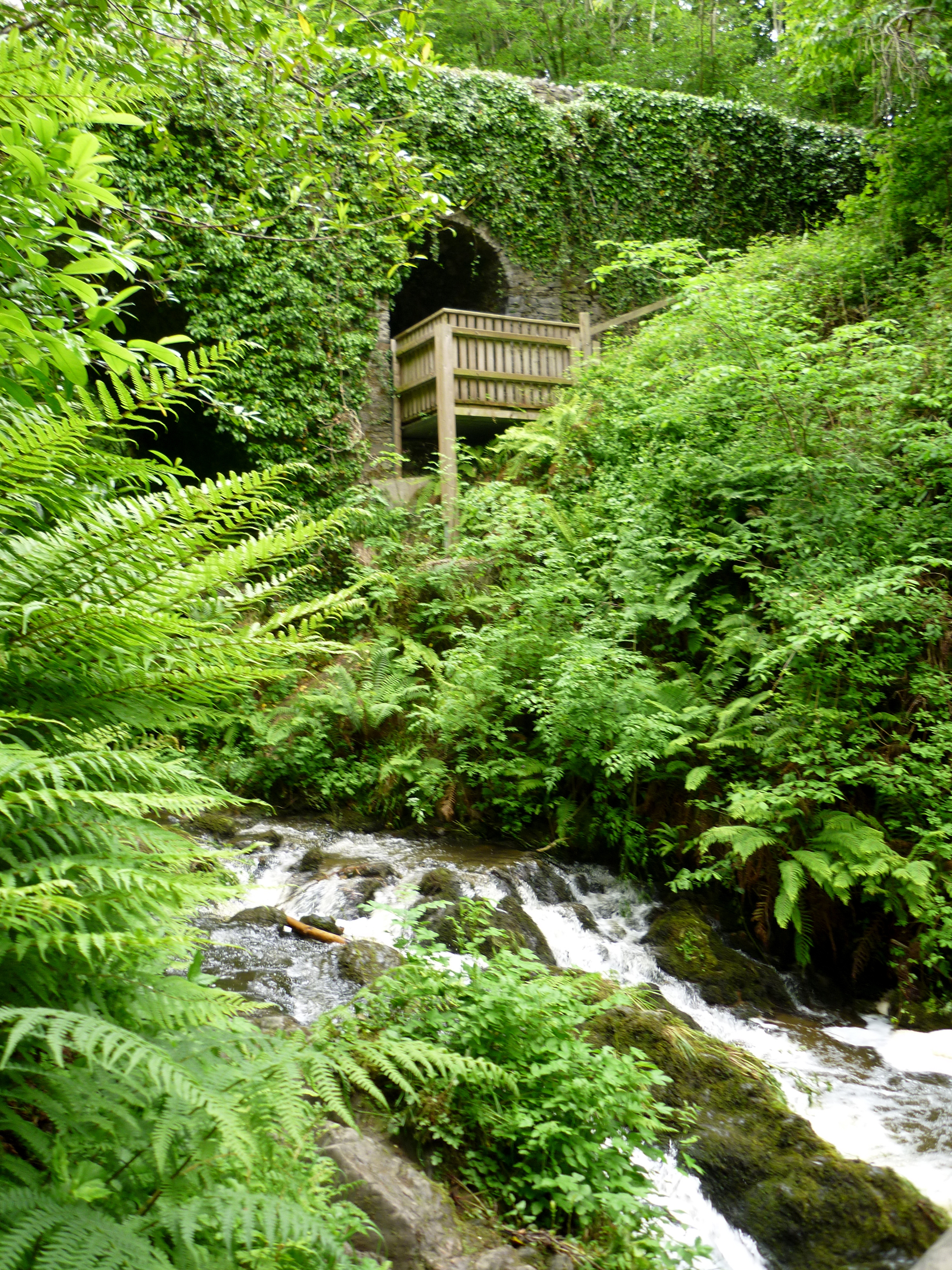
- "Cromwell's Bridge" in Dun na Ri Forest Park

- Location within Ireland
- Location: Clonee, County Cavan, Ireland
- Coordinates: 53.9175°N 6.7922°W
- Area: 565 acres (229 ha)
- Governing body: Coillte

Dún na Rí Forest Park is a forest park situated on the County Cavan–County Monaghan border in Ireland. The park itself borders the Shercock and Carrickmacross roads, more specifically at Magheracloone and Kingscourt. It forms a part of the old Cabra Estate.

== History ==
This land was owned by the O'Reilly family until the end of the sixteenth century when it came into the ownership of Thomas Fleming, 10th Baron Slane. Fleming built a castle on the site, the ruins of which can still be seen. The estate was then passed to the Pratt family, forming part of the Cabra Estate; Mervyn Pratt founded Kingscourt in 1760-1770, the modern name being an anglicisation of Dunaree (Irish: Dún an Rí, meaning 'fort of the king'). In 1959, the land was acquired by the Irish Forest Service, and became a forest park in the 1970s.

== Wildlife ==
Situated in a glen, Dún na Rí is home to stoats, hares, mink, rabbits and otters, as well as red and grey squirrel along the banks of the River Cabra. The larger trees are mainly oak and ash but many other species are also present, with an under storey of hazel, holly and rhododendron. The ground is carpeted with bluebells in spring, and there are snowdrops, wood anemone, woodrush, foxgloves, wood sorrel and a number of species of fern.

== Amenities ==
The park is approximately 2 km (1.2 mi) north of Kingscourt on the R179 road. It has a lake, walled garden and open air sculptures. There are several marked trails, as well as a paid car park, a picnic area and toilets.
