= Thomas Patrick Callaghan =

Irish long-distance runner

- Born: 1937 or 1938 (age 87–88); Bailieborough, County Cavan, Ireland
- Known for: Long distance running

Thomas Patrick Callaghan also known as T.P. Callaghan (born 1937 or 1938), is a former Irish long-distance runner. He was a long-distance runner in the 1950s and 1960s who ran in both cross country and road races throughout Ireland. He also represented Ireland at European level. From Bailieborough in County Cavan, he was the first winner of the Cavan Cross Country Cup in 1963.
