= Adrián Martín =

Adrián Martín may refer to:

- Adrián Martín (footballer) (born 1982), Spanish footballer
- Adrián Martín (motorcyclist) (born 1992), Spanish motorcyclist

== See also ==
- Adrian Martin (disambiguation)
