= St. Jude's Church (Church of Ireland) =

Coordinates: 53°20′32″N 6°18′55″W

St. Jude's Church, on the Inchicore Road, Kilmainham, in Dublin, Ireland, was a Church of Ireland (Anglican) church built between 1862 and 1864 to serve the community working in the nearby railway works, and serving the St. Jude's Parish, which included Goldenbridge, Kilmainham, and Inchicore.

== Background ==
It was built to the designs of designs by Welland and Gillespie (architects to the Ecclesiastical Commissioners of Ireland (Church of Ireland), in an English gothic style. The foundation stone was laid by the Archbishop of Dublin, Dr. Richard Whately. It was formed from the Parish of St. Jame's, and it superseded a chapel of ease. A rectory and Parish hall were also built.

The church ceased to function in 1982, and the building was sold. Four Evangelists' window(1864) from the William Wailes studio Newcastle-upon-Tynem was moved from St Jude's in 1986, to St. Ernan's, Enniskeen, Kingscourt, Co. Cavan. The main church building was dismantled and reassembled at Lodge Park Straffan, Co. Kildare, leaving only the octagonal spire remaining.

With the church's closure, worship was transferred to the neighbouring parishes. The St. Jude's Girl's Brigade (4th Company) moved to St. John's Church, Clondalkin.

In 2022, the Church Tower was put up for sale.

The Belfry Road, which is beside the tower, is named after the tower. Nash Street is named after Rev. G D Nash, who administered the church from 1900, when he replaced the evangelical Rev. Thomas Mills, who had been at St. Judes since its inception, and was primarily responsible for its establishment, and in recognition of this a memorial window was installed in his honour.

The Church would have had many worshipers from the Protestant Ascendancy Class; such as, Richmond Barracks, Inchicore, many parishioners and clerics such as Rev. Capt. Norman Palmer and Rev. Arthur George Atock MC, served in the Great War. The war memorial is now in St. Lawrence's Chapelizod.

== Books ==
- St Jude's Parish Church, Kilmainham Centenary Booklet, 1864-1964 (1964).
- St. Jude's Inchicore Road Kilmainham by John Callery
