= James Owens (VC) =

Irish recipient of the Victoria Cross

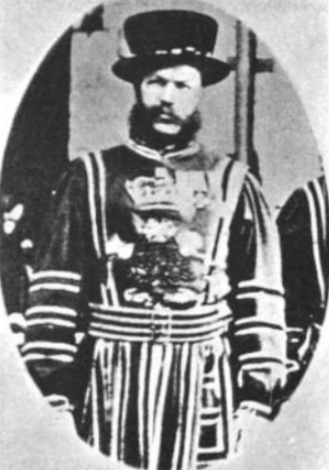
- Born: 1827; Bailieborough, County Cavan
- Died: 20 August 1901 (aged 73–74); Romford, Essex
- Burial place: Lorne Road Cemetery, Brentwood
- Military career
- Allegiance: United Kingdom
- Branch: British Army
- Rank: Sergeant
- Units: 49th Regiment of Foot
- Conflicts: Crimean War
- Awards: Victoria Cross

James Owens VC (1827 – 20 August 1901) was born in Killaine, Bailieborough, County Cavan and was an Irish recipient of the Victoria Cross, the highest and most prestigious award for gallantry in the face of the enemy that can be awarded to British and Commonwealth forces.

== Details ==
He was about 27 years old, and a corporal in the 49th Regiment of Foot (later The Royal Berkshire Regiment (Princess Charlotte of Wales's)), British Army during the Crimean War when the following deed took place for which he was awarded the VC.

On 30 October 1854 at Sebastopol, in the Crimean Peninsula, Corporal Owens greatly distinguished himself in a personal encounter with the Russians, and gave assistance to a lieutenant of his regiment.

He later achieved the rank of Sergeant. He died Romford, Essex, 20 August 1901.

His Victoria Cross is displayed at The Rifles (Berkshire and Wiltshire) Museum (Salisbury, Wiltshire, England).
