= Cabra Castle =

Ruined and 19th-century castles in County Cavan, Ireland

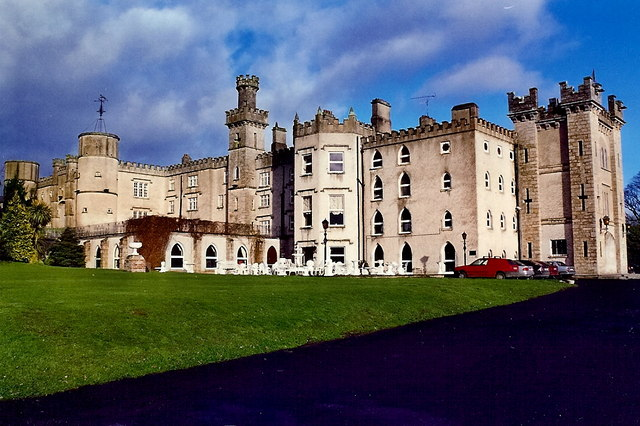

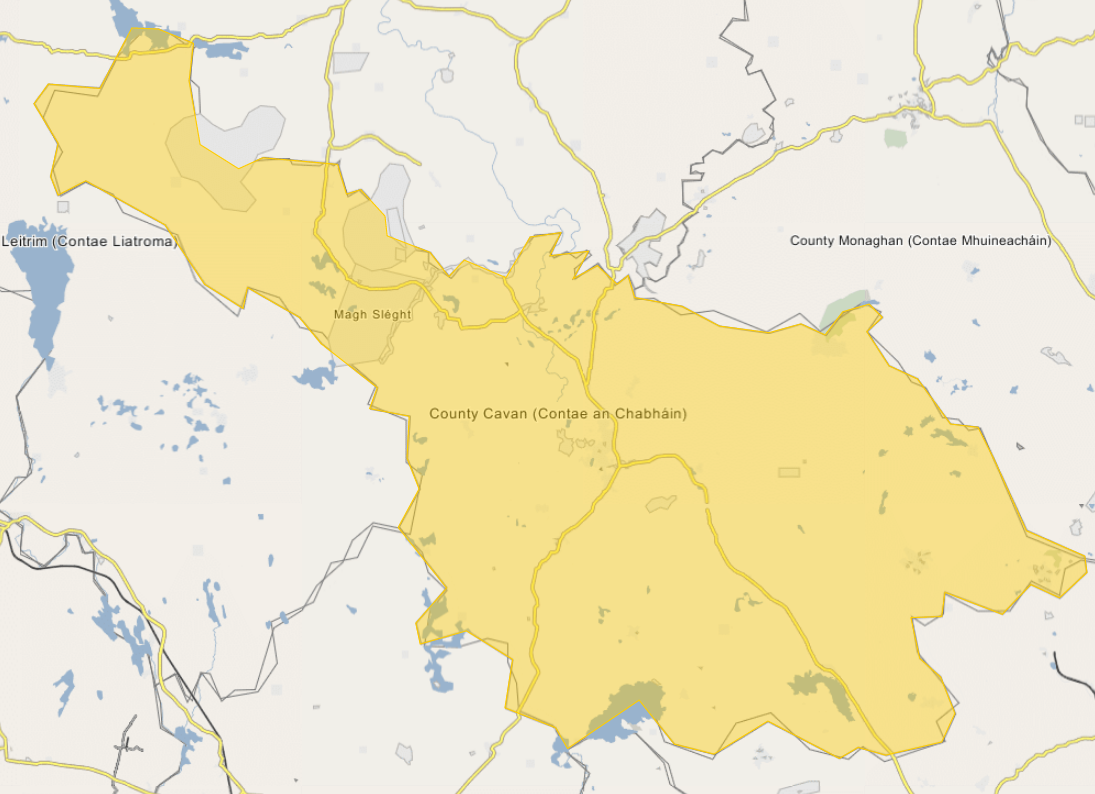
- Location within County Cavan Location within Ireland

General information
- Type: House
- Architectural style: Georgian
- Location: Carrickmacross Road, Cormey, Kingscourt, County Cavan, A82 EC64, Kingscourt, Ireland
- Coordinates: 53.913874°N 6.774524°W
- Elevation: 50 m (160 ft)
- Completed: 1808

Technical details
- Material: limestone, brick
- Floor count: 3
- Floor area: 1,032 m^{2} (11,110 sq ft)
- Grounds: 175.83 ha (434.5 acres)

Design and construction
- Developer: Henry Foster

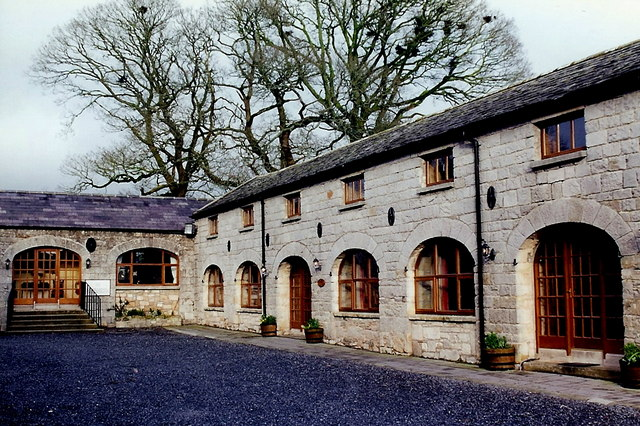
Courtyard Bedrooms Cabra Castle

Cabra Castle is the name given to two castles, one now ruined, the other convered to use as a hotel. Named for the nearby townland of Cabra, the sites of both structures are on the northside of Kingscourt in County Cavan, Ireland.

== 19th-century castle ==
The current Cabra Castle (located just off the R179 road, known locally as the Carrickmacross Road) was constructed in a mixture of the "neo-Norman-style" and the gothic revival style in the first decade of the 19th century. Much of the exterior is in a form of what might be described as the "neo-Norman-style", while the interior is mainly Gothic. This structure was originally called Cormey (or Cormy) Castle, after the local townland where it was built. It was constructed for the Foster family, a local "Ascendancy" family. However, the cost of building the new country house effectively bankrupted the Foster family. So, in 1813, shortly after the new Cormey Castle had been completed, the Fosters sold their new country house to their much wealthier neighbours, the Pratt dynasty, who were another local 'ascendancy' family.

== Earlier castle ==
The aristocratic Pratt family lived just across the Carrickmacross Road at the original Cabra House (also sometimes known as Cabra Castle) on the Cabra Estate, the family's large country estate. The Pratt family had owned the Cabra Estate since 1699. In 1813, Colonel Joseph Pratt added the new Cormey Castle and much of the Fosters' Cormey Estate to his own Cabra Estate. Cormey Castle replaced the original Cabra House as the chief "seat" of the Pratt dynasty in County Cavan. Around 1820, the Pratt family renamed Cormey Castle as Cabra Castle, the name it retains to this day.

The ruins of the original Cabra House, or Cabra Castle, can be seen on a slight height near the wishing well in what is now Dún a' Rí Forest Park, formerly part of the Cabra Estate. The forest park is now owned by Coillte, the Irish Government's forestry company.

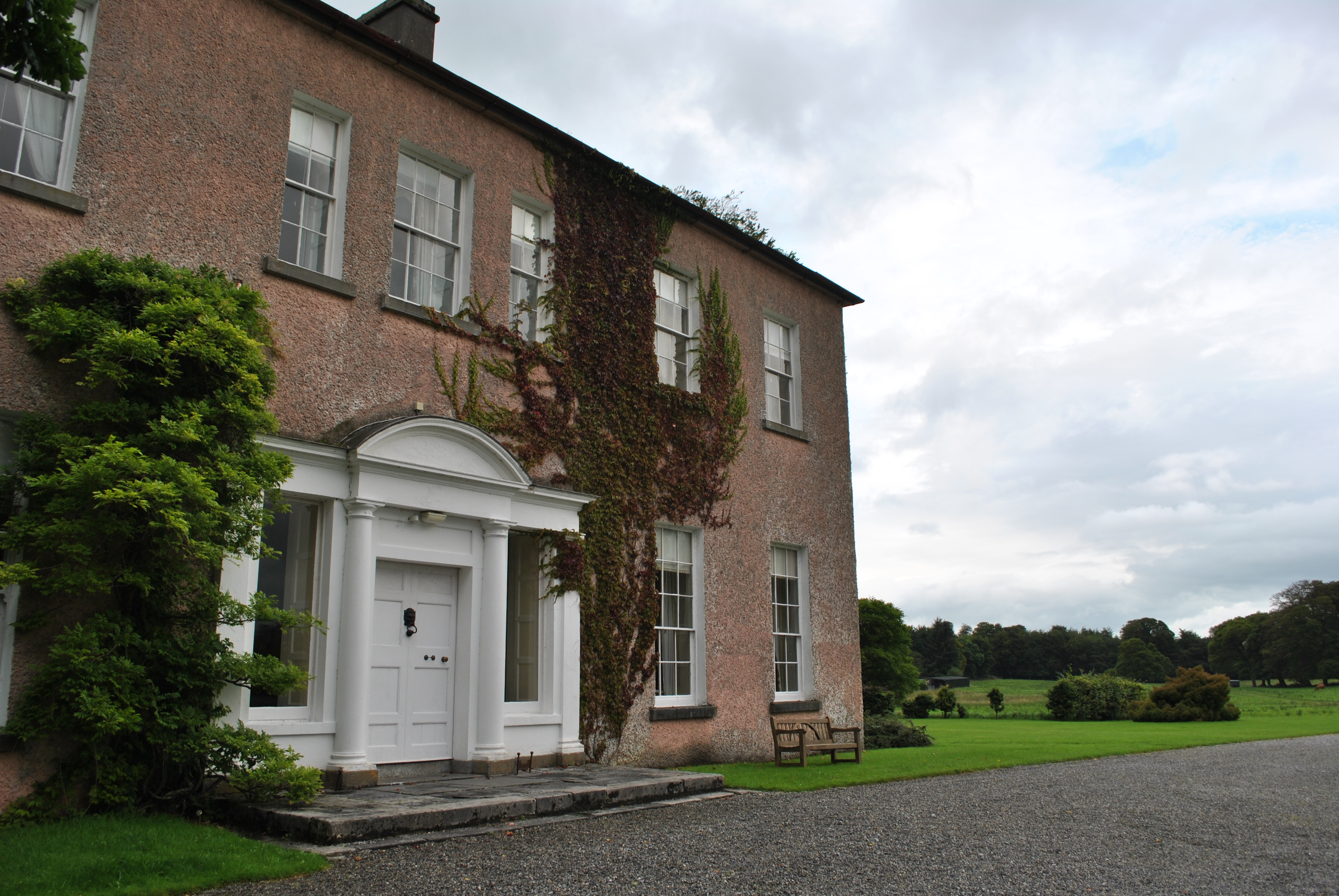
Enniscoe House

=== 20th century ===
Major Mervyn Pratt owned Cabra Castle and the Cabra Estate from 1927 until his death in December 1950. The Major, however, mainly lived at Enniscoe, another country estate that the Pratt family had owned since the 1860s near Crossmolina in County Mayo. He was succeeded by his nephew, Tan Sri Dr. Mervyn Sheppard, a long-serving civil servant with the British Colonial Service in Malaya, who was the last member of the Pratt dynasty to own Cabra Castle. Due to the mounting costs of running the castle and running what remained of the Cabra Estate, he sold the country house to a local Catholic family, the Brennans, in 1964. The Brennan family turned the castle into a hotel.

It was sold 1986 to a Mr. Mansour, a senior politician and businessman from the Emirate of Abu Dhabi in the U.A.E.. Mansour closed the hotel with the intention of turning Cabra Castle back into a private house once more. However, he never actually got round to restoring the castle as a private residence or to restoring it.

In 1991, Mansour sold Cabra Castle to the Corscadden family, who run a number of hotels. They restored the castle and turned it into a hotel again, reopening it as such in the early 1990s. It continues to be owned by the Corscadden family, and the castle remains a hotel. The castle is close to County Cavan's borders with County Monaghan and County Meath. About 100 acres of land now makes up the surrounding demesne of Cabra Castle.
