= Stradone, County Cavan =

Village in County Cavan, Ireland

Stradone Sraith an Domhain
- Village
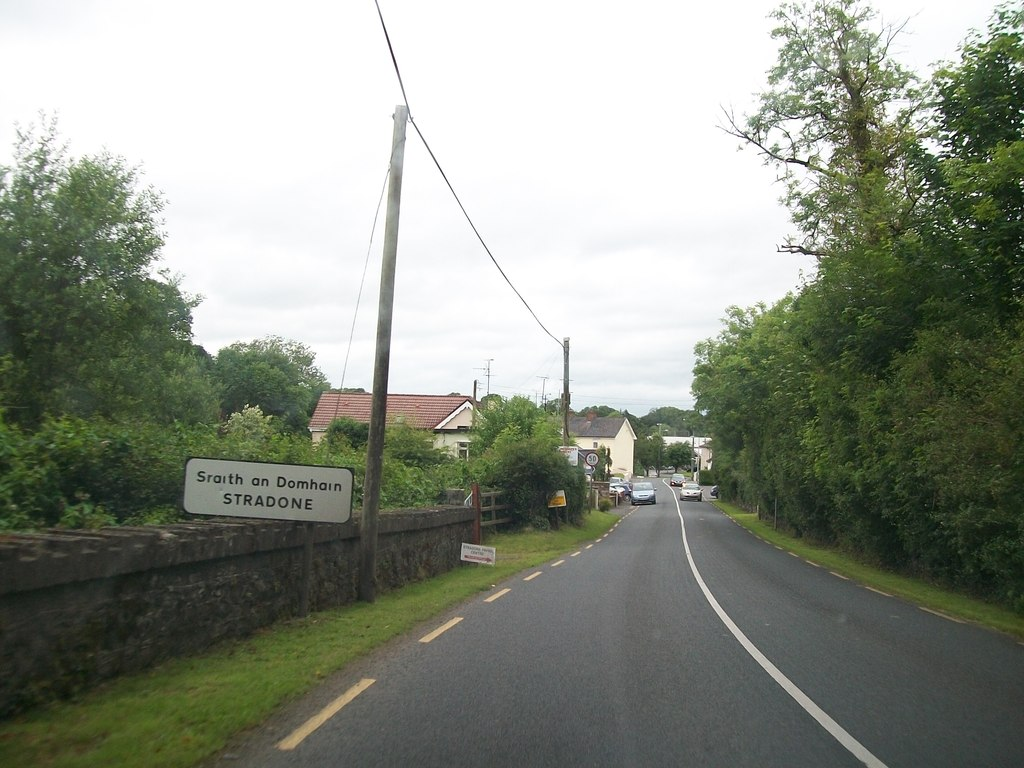
- Entering Stradone on the R165 regional road

- Location within Ireland
- Coordinates: 53.983°N 7.237°W
- Country: Ireland
- County: County Cavan
- Barony: Loughtee Upper
- Civil parish: Larah

Stradone (Irish: Sraith an Domhain; /strəˈdoʊn/ stra-DOH'N) is a village located in County Cavan, Ireland. It is situated in the civil parish of Larah 10 km (6 mi) from Cavan, near the N3 road between Cavan and Virginia. Stradone was classified as a 'small village' in the Cavan County Council Development Plan 2014-2020.

== Location ==
Stradone is a small village approximately 10 km (6 mi) east of Cavan. It is located just off the National Route N3, Dublin to Cavan, where the R165 regional road and L6046 local road converge. It is situated in the Stradone Local Electoral Area.

== History ==
Evidence of ancient settlement in the area includes a number of ringfort sites in the neighbouring townlands of Aghagolrick and Raheelagh.

A large estate house in the area, Stradone House, was built between 1828 and 1835 by architect John Benjamin Keane for the landowning Burrows family. While this burned down in 1921, during the Irish War of Independence and was subsequently demolished, a number of surrounding buildings (including stables and a gate lodge) remain.

== Amenities ==
The main focus of the village is Duke Park football pitch (home to Laragh United Gaelic Football Club) and the Stradone Community Centre, which contains a playschool, gym and shop. There is no school or church within the village boundary (these are located in the nearby Laragh area) and convenience retail is provided by a shop which is located beside "The Cross" public house within the village. Stradone post office is also located at "The Cross" in Clondargan townland.

Stradone received urban renewal scheme funding in 2004 and this resulted in a village core with street furniture and planting. The bridge over the Stradone River is a feature in the village, as are the village's two water pumps (each dated to c. 1880). The Stradone River contains a Brown Trout Fishery.

The local Garda station, which was built c. 1925, closed at the end of January 2013.

== Transport ==
As of 2013, the village was served on a Tuesday and Thursday by the Bus Éireann Dundalk to Cavan route 166 at 11.22am to Cavan and 1.45pm to Dundalk. Stradone was previously served by the Bus Éireann Cavan to Dublin bus.

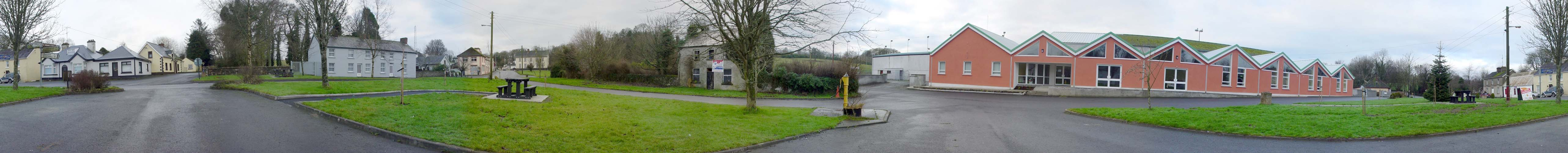
360 degree panorama Stradone village (December 2004)

== See also ==
- List of towns and villages in Ireland,
