= Kilcogy =

Village in County Cavan, Ireland

Kilcogy Coill Chóige
- Town
- The R394 passes through Kilcolgy

- Location in Ireland
- Coordinates: 53°50′N 7°25′W
- Country: Ireland
- Province: Ulster
- County: County Cavan
- Time zone: UTC+0 (WET)
  - Summer (DST): UTC-1 (IST (WEST))

Kilcogy (Irish: Coill Chóige, meaning 'wood of the war'), is a small village and townland in the civil parish of Drumlumman in south-western County Cavan, Ireland. Kilcogy is located on the R394 road.

It has been referred to as Kilcogy since at least 1610 when it is noted in the Maps of the Escheated Counties in Ireland.

== Sport ==
Mullahoran GAA club is located in the area and takes its players from the town and surrounding areas.

== People ==
- John Wilson, former Tánaiste, lived here.

== See also ==
- List of towns and villages in Ireland
