= Canningstown =

Village in County Cavan, Ireland

Canningstown Baile Chainín
- Village
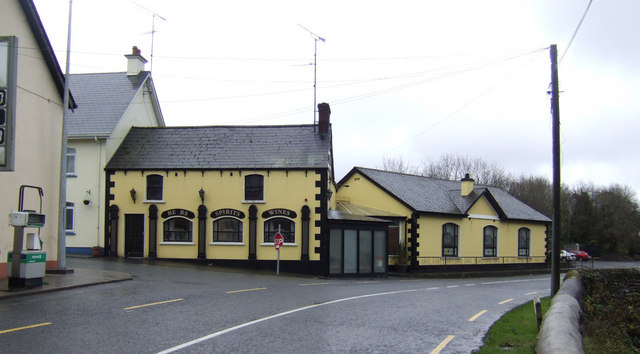
- The Bridge Tavern

- Location in Ireland
- Coordinates: 53°58′49″N 7°02′48″W
- Country: Ireland
- Province: Ulster
- County: County Cavan
- Elevation: 130 m (430 ft)
- Time zone: UTC+0 (WET)
  - Summer (DST): UTC-1 (IST (WEST))
- Irish Grid Reference: H623041

Canningstown (Irish: Baile Chainín) is a village in northeastern County Cavan, Ireland. It is located in the civil parish of Knockbride on the R191 regional road, 12 kilometres (7 mi) south of Cootehill and 10 km (6 mi) north of Bailieborough.

== History ==
The area was originally known as New Bridge, but was renamed to Canningstown around 1850 by the then Lord Garvagh who had the surname "Canning".

== See also ==
- List of towns and villages in Ireland
