= Bailieborough =

Town in County Cavan, Ireland

Bailieborough Coill an Chollaigh
- Town
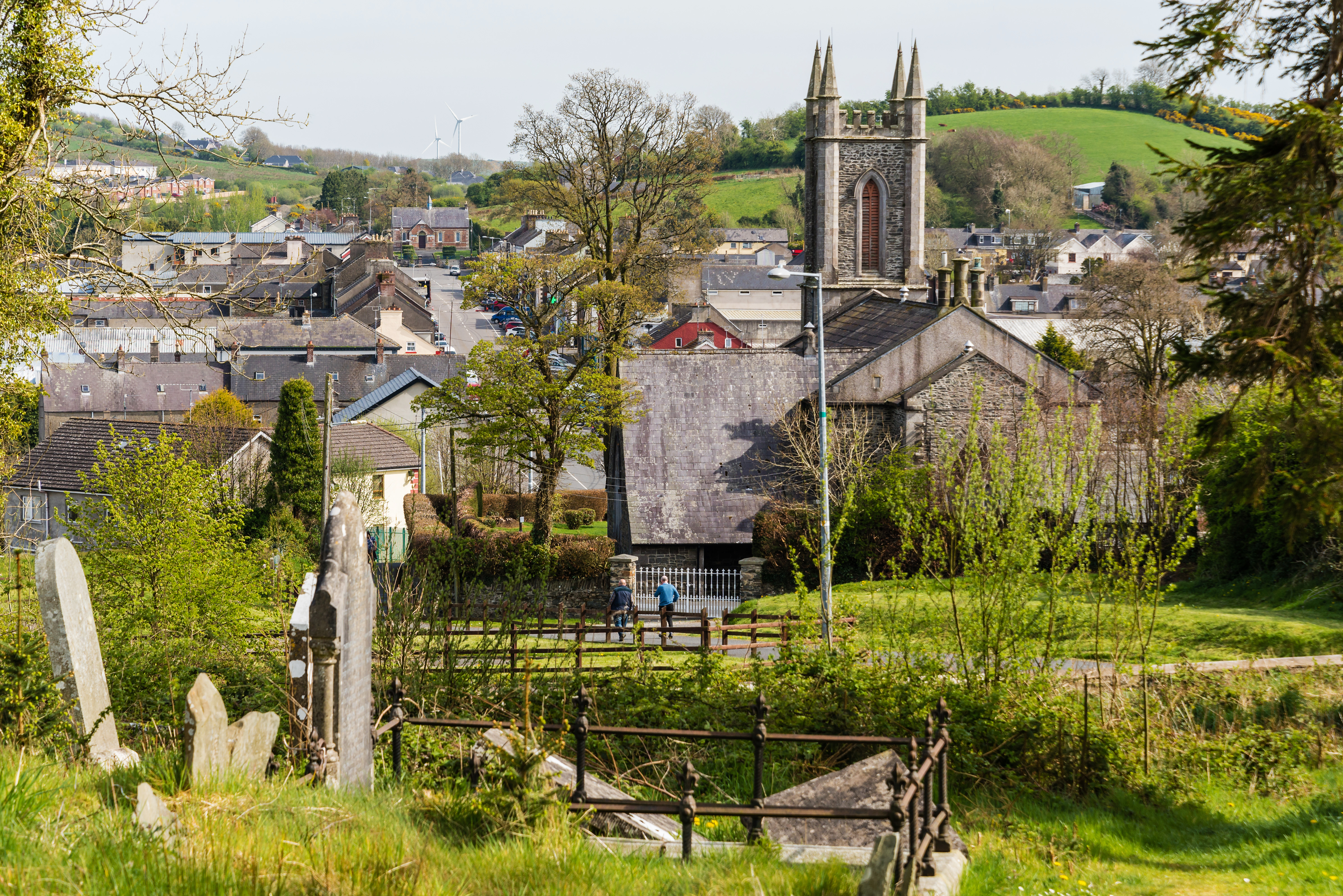
- View of Bailieborough and the Church of Ireland church

- Location in Ireland
- Coordinates: 53°55′01″N 6°58′15″W
- Country: Ireland
- Province: Ulster
- County: County Cavan
- Established: 1610
- Elevation: 146 m (479 ft)

Population (2022)
  - Total: 2,974
- Time zone: UTC±0 (WET)
  - Summer (DST): UTC+1 (IST)
- Eircode routing key: A82
- Telephone area code: +353(0)42
- Irish Grid Reference: N676968
- Website: bailieborough.com

Bailieborough or Bailieboro (/ˈbeɪlibərə/; Irish: Coill an Chollaigh, meaning 'the wood of the boar') is a town and civil parish in County Cavan, Ireland. As of the 2022 census, the population was 2,974, up from 1,529 as of the 1996 census. Bailieborough's proximity to the N3 national road has made it a commuter town.

== History ==
=== Plantation ===
Before the Plantation of Ulster, the area covered by the town was known as Killechally, Killycolly and Killycollie (Irish: Coill an Chollaigh). The modern town was founded by William Bailie, a Scottish planter who was granted the lands of Tonergie (Tandragee) in East Breifne by James I, the King of England. This area was known as the Barony of Clankee, later known as Bailieburrow.

The conditions of being granted these lands were that within 2 years Bailie had to have constructed a house and bawn for himself, along with building tenant houses so he could collect revenue in the form of rent. An annuity would have to be paid to the English monarch, this annuity would also be reduced if Bailie gave preference to settling Scottish people on his land. Included in his duties of planting the area, he had to ensure that there were blunderbusses and muskets available so he could arm his men to defend the new plantation. Finally, he was obliged to take an Oath of supremacy to the English monarch as the Supreme Governor of the Church of England and the undisputed English monarch.

By 1613, Bailie had constructed an estate house for himself known as 'Manor of Bailieburrow'. This house, later known as Bailieborough Castle, was situated in a demesne that is today known as Castle Lake Forest. (This house was damaged by fire in the early 20th century and demolished in the 1930s.)

The town continued to develop, and in 1626 a report recorded that the town's name was now Bailieborough, which it has maintained to this day. Originally, a number of thatched houses had developed around the gates of the castle but this was deemed unsightly and it was decided that the settlement would be moved. Thus, Bailieborough moved to where the current old Church of Ireland chapel is located in the town. This remains the town's location.

In 1685, ownership of the estate was passed to a Scottish man known as Hamilton, who then sold the estate to a man called Colonel Stewart. The estate changed hands again when it was sold to Stewart Corry, a landowner from Rockcorry and a member of the Corry family. Leading up to the 1798 Rebellion, the castle grounds were used for training by rebels. Today, a memorial to the rebels stands at the foot of 'Rebel Hill' in the castle grounds. In 1814, the estate was sold to Sir William Young who had returned from travels in the East Indies. Young is responsible for the current design of the town, with the Main Street design being attributed to him.

=== Later development ===
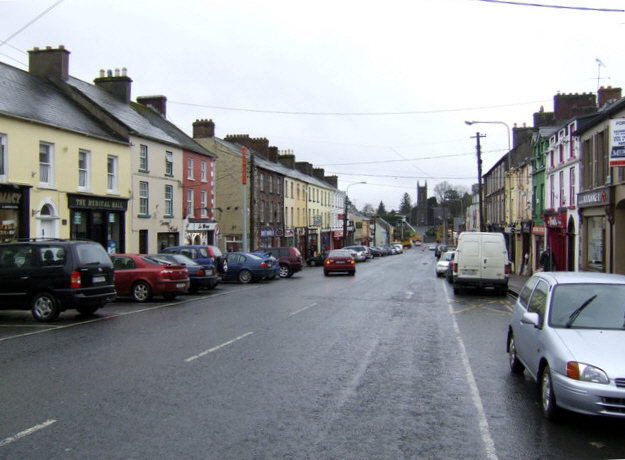
Main Street in 2007

The 1800s saw additional development in the town. For example, the town's courthouse was erected in 1817, with the Bridewell Jail being opened in 1833. The courthouse is no longer in use for its original design and is now a community hall. In 1833, work began on a new Church of Ireland church located at the bottom of the town. It was completed in 1875 when the bell was erected in the Belfry. The church replaced the old Protestant church located in the estate of Woodview, which now lies in ruin. As of 2023, the incumbent rector is Canon Ian W. Horner, having served in the role since 2016. In 2023, he also became Archdeacon of Kilmore.

A new Catholic church was constructed in 1839, with Phillip O'Reilly as the parish priest at the time. It replaced an old thatched chapel that had stood since the 1700s. The bell tower was constructed in 1851, while between 1868 and 1870 the chancel, baptistery and sacristy were erected. The marble altar located in the church has been in the church since 24 December 1895. The Stations of the Cross inside the church were painted by George Collie, an Irish artist in 1956. As of 2023, the parish priest was Fr. Ultan McGoohan, who moved from Teemore in 2019.

On 9 July 1921 the Free State barracks in Bailieboro were attacked and taken, the arms of its garrison being seized.

== Schools ==
The town has a secondary school, Bailieborough Community School, which is the only second-level institution in the town. It is adjacent to the local Catholic church, one of the churches serving the parish of Killann. There are two primary schools in the town: St Anne's Primary School and The Model School.

== Transport ==
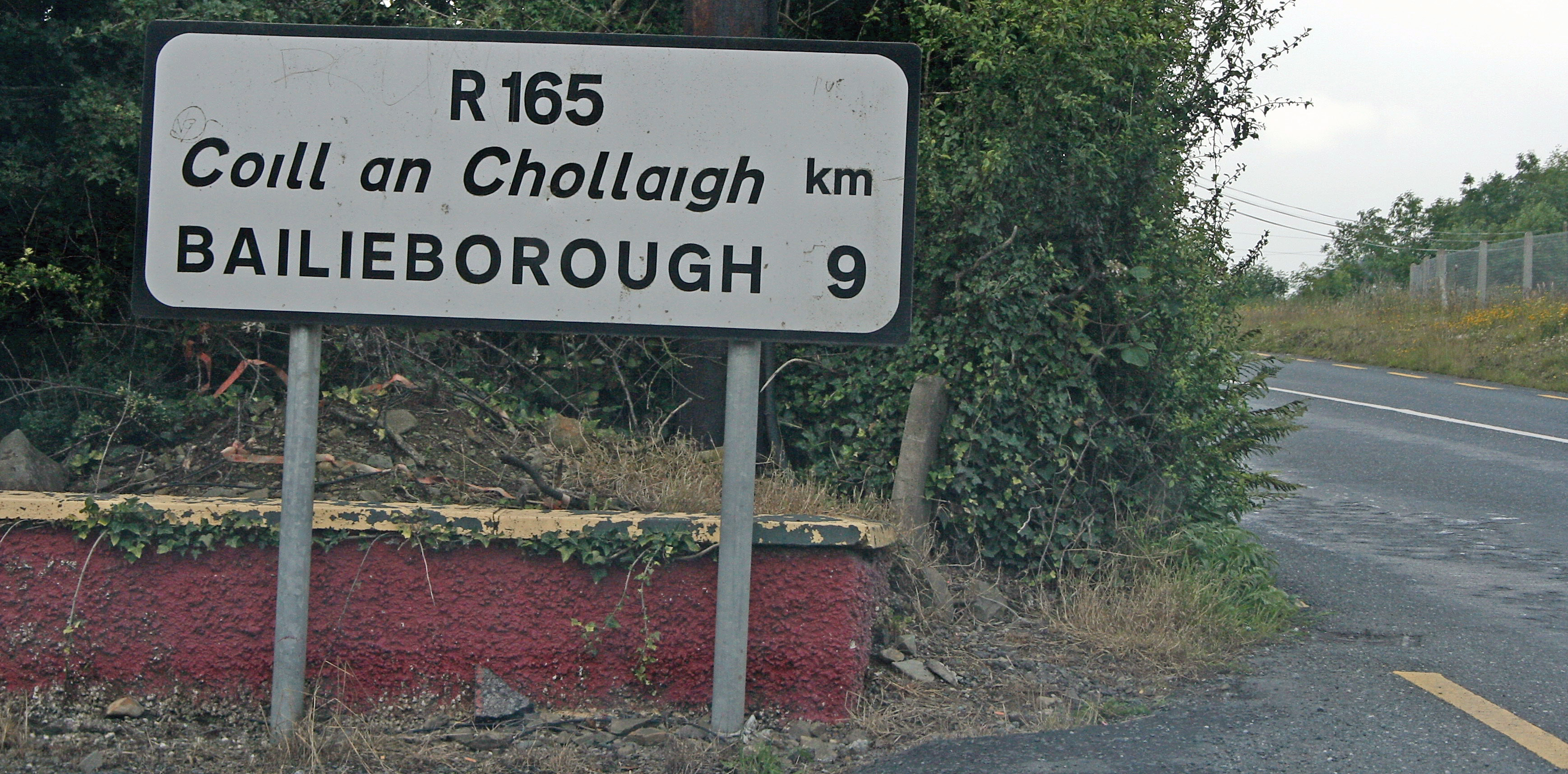
Road signage mentioning Bailieborough on the R165 road

Dublin city centre is 89 km by road via Kells and the M3 motorway. Bailieborough is at the meeting-point of regional roads R165, R178 and R191.

Bus Éireann route 108 provides service to Kells with onward connections to Dublin and Dublin Airport. Route 166 provides service to Cavan and Dundalk.

== Sport ==
The local Gaelic football club is Bailieborough Shamrocks. Their home ground is at St Anne's Park and the club has won five Cavan Senior Football championships.

The local association football club is Bailieboro Celtic A.F.C., with the club's alumni including professional players Cillian Sheridan and Leanne Kiernan.

== Surrounding areas ==
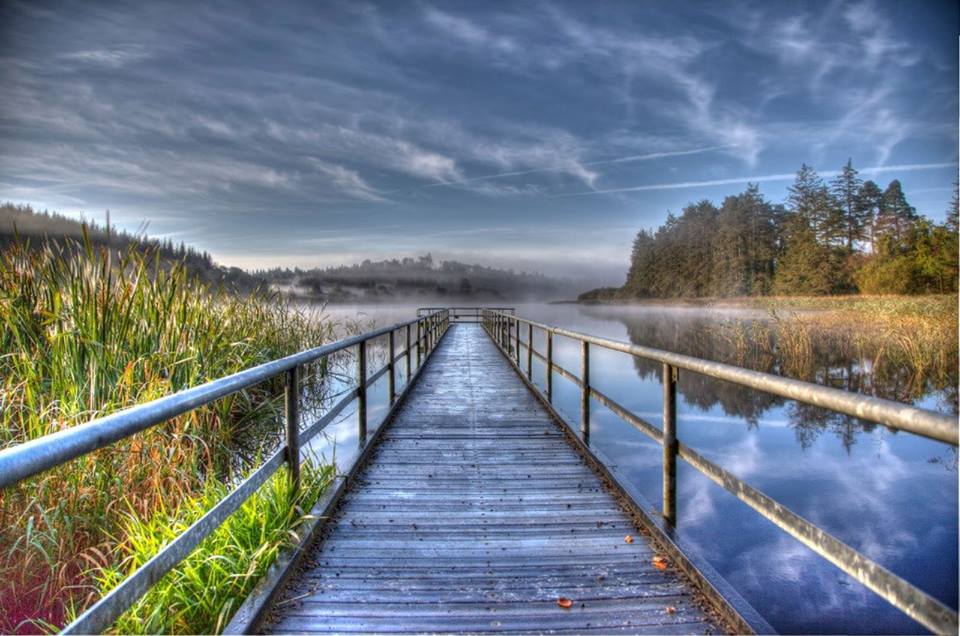
Jetty on Castle Lake, near the former Bailieborough Castle demesne

Points of interest in the surrounding area include a viewpoint over Lough an Lae, and the natural environment of Town Lake (situated within the town) and Castle Lake (to the north). There is a walking trail around Castle Lake, through part of the former Bailieborough Castle estate.

== Demographics ==
As of the 2022 census, Bailiebourough had a population of 2,974, up from 2,530 in the 2011 census and from 1,660 in 2002.

In terms of religious makeup, over 65% of the 2022 population identified as Roman Catholic, with 9% of other religions, and 26% with no religion or no stated religion. In comparison, the 1911 census indicated that approximately 68% identified as Roman Catholic, with nearly 20% identifying as Church of Ireland, 10% as Presbyterian, and approximately 2% as Methodist. When extended to the surrounding townlands, the 1911 census indicated that approximately 61% were Roman Catholic, while 17% were Church of Ireland, 20% were Presbyterian, and under 2% were Methodist.

== People ==
- William Bailie (died 1664), Bishop of Clonfert and Kilmacduagh.
- Thomas Patrick Callaghan (born 1938), long-distance runner
- Edward Frederick Clarke (1850–1905), Mayor of Toronto.
- Fargal O'Reilly (died 1829), Roman Catholic prelate that served as Bishop of Kilmore between 1807 and 1829.
- Alexander Greenlaw Hamilton (1852–1941), naturalist and teacher.
- Shane Codd (born 1997), music producer and DJ.
- John B. Cosgrave (born 1946), mathematician and number theorist.
- Mick Finnegan, President of the Workers' Party.
- James Kelly (1929–2003).
- Leanne Kiernan (born 1999), association football player.
- John Young, 1st Baron Lisgar (1807–1876), Governor General of Canada from 1869 to 1872; Lord Lisgar retired to his family seat, Bailieborough Castle, also known as Lisgar House, where he died in October 1876.
- Philip McShane (1932–2020), mathematician and philosopher-theologian.
- Tom MacIntyre (1931–2019), poet and playwright.
- Joe O'Reilly (born 1955), Fine Gael Senator, Leas-Chathaoirleach of the Seanad and former TD.
- James Owens (1827–1901), recipient of the Victoria Cross.
- Francis Sheehy-Skeffington (1878–1916), suffragist, pacifist and writer.
- Patsy (Fitzpatrick) Cornwallis-West (1854–1920), Irish-born British aristocrat.
- Cillian Sheridan (born 1989), association football player.
- Patrick Smith (1901–1977), Fianna Fáil politician and government minister. He is also the longest serving TD in the history of the state
- Niamh Smyth (born 1978), Fianna Fáil politician and grandniece of Patrick Smith.

== See also ==
- List of towns and villages in Ireland
- Market Houses in Ireland
