= George Collie (painter) =

Irish painter

- Born: 14 April 1904; Carrickmacross, Ireland
- Died: 1 July 1975 (aged 71); Dublin, Ireland
- Occupation: Painter

George Collie (14 April 1904 – 1 July 1975) was an Irish painter known for his portraits in the academic style and his religious commissions.

== Life ==
George Collie was born in Greaghdrummit, Carrickmacross, County Monaghan on 14 April 1904. His parents were George and Ellen Collie (née Donovan). His mother was from Carrickmacross, and his father was a chef from Aberdeen. Collie grew up in Dublin, attending St Kevin's School, Blackpitts, later studying with the Royal Hibernian Academy (RHA) and then the Metropolitan School of Art, Dublin. He was awarded the Taylor scholarship in 1927 for his painting The midday meal. In 1928 he won the Taylor award again, leaving Dublin to study at Royal College of Art, London, followed by the Académie de la Grande Chaumière and the Académie Colarossi in Paris. His work was part of the painting event in the art competition at the 1932 Summer Olympics.

After his return to Dublin he taught at the Metropolitan School of Art, but later opened a school and studio on Schoolhouse Lane, off Molesworth Street in 1938. The school was open for 30 years, and Collie taught continuously until a few weeks before his death.

Known for his portraits, numerous famous and leading figures in Irish society sat for portraits with Collie, including Liam Cosgrave, Cardinal John D'Alton, Éamon de Valera, and Thomas MacGreevy. He was also commissioned by churches including the church of St Brigid, in Killester, and Cavan cathedral. He painted stations of the cross for the cathedral of the Assumption, Carlow, and Our Lady of the Rosary church in Harold's Cross, Dublin.

He also painted genre paintings such as Blighted hopes (c. 1933) and This generation (c. 1946). In 1953 he was featured in the Contemporary Irish Art exhibition at Aberystwyth, and in 1957 at the Ritchie Hendriks Gallery, Dublin in an exhibition of flower painting. Between 1922 and 1975 he exhibited at all RHA exhibitions bar 1929. He was elected an Associate to the RHA in 1933, and a member in 1942. He became a member of the Arts Council, but resigned in 1974 due to ill health.

He married Ann Dunne in 1925. They had 3 daughters and 4 sons. He died on 1 July 1975 in Dublin, and is buried in Deans Grange cemetery.

== Legacy ==
Collie has paintings on display in the Hugh Lane Gallery, the Irish Writers' Centre, the Ulster Museum and the National Self-Portrait Collection of Ireland in Limerick City Art Gallery. One of his most famous works of art, "A Dublin Market" depicts a fruit and vegetable market in Smithfield, Dublin. Collie's The Midday Meal is now held in the National Gallery of Ireland.

Collie taught a number of Irish artists including R.N. Brady, Leo Clancy, and Don Conroy.
