= Adrian Martin (chef) =

Irish chef and author (born 1991)

- Born: 9 October 1991 (age 34)
- Occupations: Chef, restaurateur, author, TV presenter
- Years active: 2014–present
- Website: https://chefadrianmartin.com/

Adrian Martin is an Irish chef and author from Cavan. He is the owner and head chef of Wildflower Restaurant, formerly of Camden in London, and as of 2025, in Blackrock Market, Dublin.

== Early life and education ==
Martin is from Cavan. His father John is involved in the food industry, running an event management company which sets up cookery demonstrations and food festivals.

Martin studied culinary arts at the School of Tourism, Killybegs, studied at South West College, Enniskillen, and studied baking and pastry arts management at Dublin Institute of Technology, Kevin Street.

== Career ==
Starting at the age of 14, Martin trained at Neven Maguire's Mac Nean House and at Bon Appetit in Malahide.

In 2020, days before the COVID-19 pandemic struck, he opened Wildflower in London's Camden neighborhood in a shipping container. Closed multiple times under pandemic measures. In 2021, he moved the Wildflower concept to Dublin's south inner city, opening in a listed Georgian-era building on South Richmond Street in February 2022. With over 120,000 euro invested, Wildflower had two dining rooms and a bar, and was serving 60-80 diners nightly. In 2024 opened a one-table Wildflower Restaurant \("3.0") in Dublin's Blackrock Market as a pop up, which launched in December of that year.

== Media work ==
Martin is one of the resident chefs on the Six o' Clock show on TV3/Virgin Media 1 which is hosted by Martin King and Lucy Kennedy.He also led Chef Adrian Eats Ireland (Amazon Prime, 2021) and Wild Cooks (BBC, 2020),having previously led two shows on the RTE Player platform in 2016.

== Bibliography ==
- 2017: Fakeaway: Fast Food Made Healthy
- 2019: Create Beautiful Food at Home
