= R178 road (Ireland) =

Road in Ireland

R178 road
- Bóthar R178
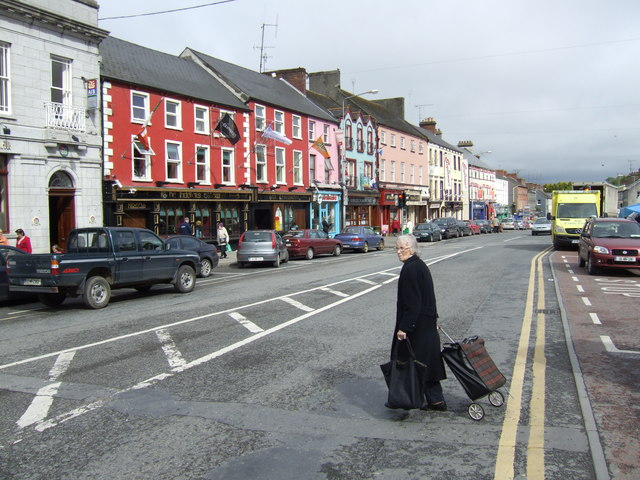
- Main Street, Carrickmacross, on the R178

Location
- Country: Ireland

Highway system
- Roads in Ireland; Motorways; Primary; Secondary; Regional

The R178 road is a regional road in Ireland. It runs from Dundalk, County Louth via Carrickmacross, County Monaghan and Shercock to Virginia, County Cavan.

== See also ==
- Roads in Ireland
- National primary road
- National secondary road
