= County Cavan =

County in Ireland

Coordinates: 53°55′N 7°15′W

County Cavan Contae an Chabháin
- County
- Coat of arms
- Nickname: The Breffni County
- Motto: Irish: Feardhacht is Fírinne "Manliness and Truth"
- Interactive map of County Cavan
- Country: Ireland
- Province: Ulster
- Region: Northern and Western
- Established: 21 August 1579
- County town: Cavan

Government
  - Local authority: Cavan County Council
  - Dáil constituency: Cavan–Monaghan
  - EP constituency: Midlands–North-West

Area
  - Total: 1,932 km^{2} (746 sq mi)
  - Rank: 19th
- Highest elevation (Cuilcagh): 665 m (2,182 ft)

Population (2022)
  - Total: 81,704
  - Rank: 25th
  - Density: 42.29/km^{2} (109.5/sq mi)
- Time zone: UTC±0 (WET)
  - Summer (DST): UTC+1 (IST)
- Eircode routing keys: A82, H12, H14, H16 (primarily)
- Telephone area codes: 042, 049 (primarily)
- ISO 3166 code: IE-CN
- Vehicle index mark code: CN
- Website: Official website

County Cavan (/ˈkævən/ KAV-ən; Irish: Contae an Chabháin) is a county in Ireland. It is in the province of Ulster and is part of the Northern and Western Region. It is named after the town of Cavan and is based on the historic Gaelic territory of East Breffny (Bréifne). Cavan County Council is the local authority for the county, which had a population of 81,704 at the 2022 census.

== Geography ==
Cavan borders six counties: Leitrim to the west, Fermanagh to the north, Monaghan to the north-east, Meath to the south-east, Longford to the south-west and Westmeath to the south. Cavan shares a 70 km (43 mi) border with County Fermanagh in Northern Ireland. Cavan is the 19th largest of the 32 counties in area and the 25th largest by population.

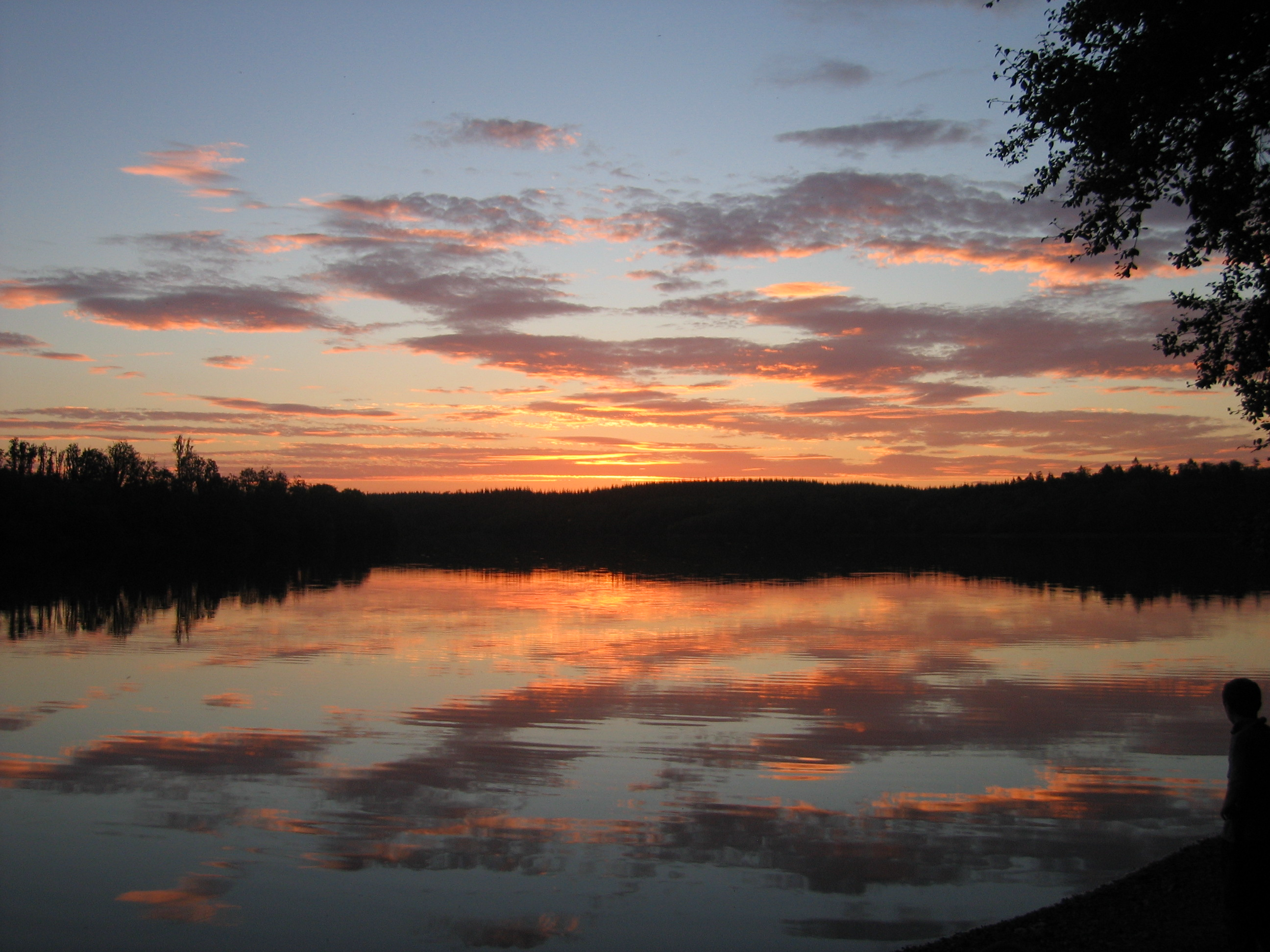
Lough Oughter

The county is part of the Northern and Western Region, a NUTS II area, and in that region, is part of the Border strategic planning area, a NUTS III entity.

The county is characterised by drumlin countryside dotted with many lakes and hills. The north-western area of the county is sparsely populated and mountainous. The Cuilcagh mountain range contain the highest point, Cuilcagh, at 665 metres (2,182 feet).

Cavan is the source of many rivers. Shannon Pot on the slopes of Cuilcagh is the source of the River Shannon, the longest river in Ireland at 386 km (240 mi). The River Erne is a major river which rises from Beaghy Lough, two miles (3 km) south of Stradone in Cavan and flows for 120 km (75 mi) to Lough Erne. Other rivers in the county include the Blackwater River, which rises near Bailieborough and flows through Lough Ramor, joining the River Boyne at Navan; the Dee which springs near Bailieborough; the River Annalee which flows from Lough Sillan and joins the Erne; and the Cladagh river which rises from Cuilcagh and flows into Fermanagh. The Glyde and the Owenroe also source in Cavan.

Cavan is known as 'The Lakeland County' and is reputed to contain 365 lakes. A 2021 book by local photographer Hu O'Reilly listed and photographed the 365 lakes. At 18.8 km^{2} (7.3 sq mi), Lough Sheelin is the county's largest lake; it is situated in the south of the county and forms a three way border on its waters between counties Meath, Westmeath and Cavan. A large complex of lakes form in the north and west of Cavan into designated Specially Protected Areas (SPA); an example is Lough Oughter. Other important wildlife protected lakes such as Lough Gowna and Lough Ramor are in the south and east of the county. Cavan has a mainly hilly (drumlin) landscape and contains just under 7,000 hectares (17,000 acres) of forested area, 3.6% of Cavan's total land area. The county contains forests such as Bellamont Forest near Cootehill, Killykeen Forest Park at Lough Oughter (a Coillte state forest concern), Dún na Rí Forest Park and the Burren Forest.

=== Climate ===
Ballyhaise, Cavan

Climate chart (precipitation, max. and min. temperature)
J	F	M	A	M	J	J	A	S	O	N	D
78 8 2	68 8 2	66 10 3	58 12 4	57 15 6	57 17 11	59 19 12	89 19 12	58 16 9	98 13 6	68 9 3	76 8 3
- █ Average max. and min. temperatures in °C
- █ Precipitation totals in mm
Imperial conversion
J	F	M	A	M	J	J	A	S	O	N	D
3.1 46 35	2.7 46 35	2.6 49 37	2.3 53 39	2.2 59 43	2.2 63 51	2.3 66 54	3.5 66 53	2.3 61 47	3.9 55 44	2.7 49 38	3 46 37
- █ Average max. and min. temperatures in °F
- █ Precipitation totals in inches

Met Éireann records the climate data for Cavan from their station at Ballyhaise. Under Köppen climate classification, Cavan experiences a maritime temperate oceanic climate with cold winters, mild humid summers, and a lack of temperature extremes. The average maximum January temperature is 8.2 °C (47 °F), while the average maximum July temperature is 19.8 °C (68 °F). On average, the sunniest months are May and June, while the wettest month is October with 104.4 mm (4 in) of rain, and the driest months are May and June with 67.8 mm (3 in) and 67.9 mm (3 in) respectively. Humidity is high year round and rainfall is evenly distributed throughout the year, with the annual precipitation at Ballyhaise being 1,006 mm (40 in)

On average, snow showers occur between November and March. In the winter of 2010–11, record low temperatures for November, December and January were recorded in Cavan. In late December, the temperature at the station fell to −15.4 °C (4 °F), its lowest ever. On 21 December 2010, a daily maximum of −9.4 °C (15 °F) was recorded at Ballyhaise, the lowest daily maximum ever recorded in Ireland. Summer daytime temperatures range between 15 °C (59 °F) and 22 °C (72 °F), with temperatures rarely going beyond 25 °C (77 °F). The average annual sunshine hours range between 1,300 hours in the north to 1,500 hours in the south.

== Subdivisions ==
=== Baronies ===
There are eight historic baronies in the county. While baronies continue to be officially defined units, they are no longer used for many administrative purposes. Their official status is illustrated by Placenames Orders made since 2003, where official Irish names of baronies are listed under "Administrative units".

- Castlerahan (Caisleán Raithin) see Virginia, County Cavan
- Clankee (Clann Chaoich)
- Clanmahon (Clann Mhathúna)
- Loughtee Lower (Lucht Tí Íochtarach)
- Loughtee Upper (Lucht Tí Uachtarach) – whose chief town, Cavan, is also the county town
- Tullygarvey (Teallach Ghairbhíth)
- Tullyhaw (Teallach Eathach) – the largest in the county at 89,852 acres (363.62 km^{2})
- Tullyhunco (Teallach Dhúnchadha)

=== Civil parishes and townlands ===
Townlands are the smallest officially defined geographical divisions in Ireland. There are approximately 1979 townlands in the county.

=== Towns and villages ===
- Arvagh
- Bailieborough
- Ballinagh
- Ballyconnell
- Ballyhaise
- Ballyjamesduff
- Bawnboy
- Belturbet
- Blacklion
- Butlersbridge
- Canningstown
- Cavan
- Cootehill
- Crossdoney
- Dowra
- Glangevlin
- Kilcogy
- Killeshandra
- Kilnaleck
- Kingscourt
- Lough Gowna
- Milltown
- Mountnugent
- Mullagh
- Redhills
- Shercock
- Stradone
- Swanlinbar
- Virginia

=== Largest towns (2022) ===
1. Cavan – 11,741
2. Virginia – 3,211
3. Bailieborough – 2,974
4. Kingscourt – 2,955
5. Ballyjamesduff – 2,917
6. Cootehill – 1,856
7. Mullagh – 1,651
8. Belturbet – 1,610
9. Ballyconnell – 1,422

== History ==
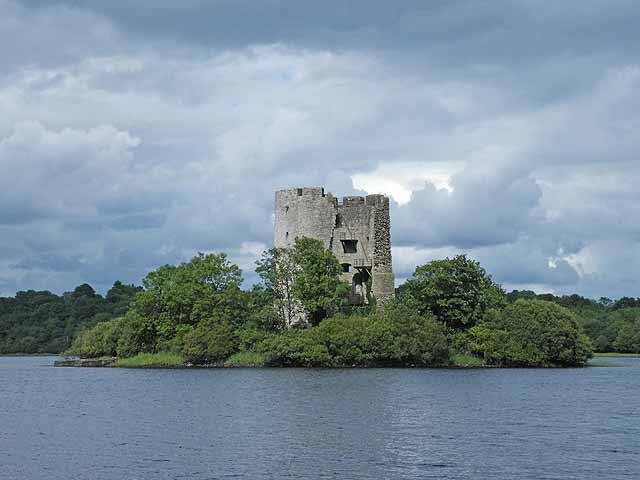
Cloughoughter Castle

From around the thirteenth century the area (Cavan) was part of the petty kingdom of East Bréifne anglicized Breffny O'Reilly after its then ruling Gaelic family. This in turn was the east division Kingdom of Bréifne. For this reason the county is colloquially known as the Breffni County. A high degree of defense was achieved by using the natural landscape of drumlin hills and loughs. The poorly drained heavy clay soils contributed as an obstacle against invasion.

From the late twelfth century East Breifne were subjected to Norman influence and the remains of several motte and bailie fortifications are still visible, as well as the remains of stronger works such as Castlerahan and Clogh Oughter castle. The growing influence of several monastic orders in the new diocese called Tir Briuin Breifne from the mid twelfth century with abbey remains existent in locations such as Drumlane and later Trinity Island.

Historically, the Ui Briuin Kingdom of Breifne was part of the western province of Connacht ruled over by the O'Rourke clan until around 1256 when under Norman occupation the kingdom was split in half. West Breifne still ruled by O'Rourkes and East Breifni ruled by O'Reillys. During the sixteenth century in the reign of Queen Elizabeth I the county of Cavan was formed and transferred to Ulster from 1584, following the composition of Breifne. In the south, the Lough Sheelin area was part of Leinster until the late 14th century.

Under James VI and I, from 1610 the Plantation of Ulster saw the settlement and origins of several new towns within the county that include Bailieborough, Cootehill, Killeshandra and Virginia. Existing towns such as Cavan and Belturbet became over time more important as trading centres. Wars during the mid-seventeenth century aimed at trying to unsettle the Plantation only led to further plantations of English and Scottish settlers into the county, bringing with them better farming methods and the beginnings of a thriving flax and linen industry.

Some areas of Cavan were hard hit by the Great Famine potato blight between 1845 and 1849. The winter of 1847 is particularly noted for the high levels of deaths nationally caused by diseases such as typhus and cholera. Several instances of eviction also occurred during the nineteenth century, with one such story where the local landlord in Mountnugent parish decided to evict over 200 people. The famous ballad "By Lough Sheelin Side" is based on this event witnessed by the local Catholic priest.

Edward Saunderson, founder of the Ulster Unionist Council, was born in the county. However, when the Irish Unionist Party met on 9 June 1916, the delegates from Cavan learnt that they would not be included in any "temporary exclusion of Ulster" from Home Rule; they agreed only with very great reluctance.

== Local government and national politics ==
The island of Ireland, showing location of County Cavan.

=== Local government ===
Results of the 2019 Cavan County Council election
Party	Seats	% of votes	% Change since 2014	Seat Change
Fianna Fáil	8	38.9%	▼1.7%	▲1
Fine Gael	7	33.4%	▼3.5%	No Change
Sinn Féin	1	12.4%	▼5.9%	▼3
Labour	0	2.2%	▲1.6%	No Change
Independent	2	13.2%	▲9.3%	▲2

Cavan is divided into three local electoral areas: Bailieborough-Cootehill, Ballyjamesduff-Virginia and Cavan-Belturbet, which hold 18 county council seats in total. The 2019 local elections in Cavan had an average voter turnout of 55.5%, roughly equalling the turnout in 2014 (56.42%). The highest turnout for an electoral area was Bailieborough-Cootehill with 57.1%.

=== Former districts ===
It was formerly divided into the rural districts of Bailieborough, Bawnboy, Castlerahan, Cavan, Enniskillen No. 2, and Mullaghoran, and the urban districts of Cavan, Belturbet and Cootehill. The rural districts were abolished in 1925. Belturbet and Cootehill were downgraded to town commissioners in 1950. In 2002, the urban district of Cavan and the town commissioners of Belturbet and Cootehill became town councils. All town councils in Ireland were abolished in 2014.

=== National elections ===
County Cavan is within the Dáil constituency of Cavan–Monaghan, which returns five deputies. This constituency was created in 1977, replacing the constituency of Cavan, which had been in existence from 1921. From 2016 to 2020, the area of West Cavan was within the constituency of Sligo–Leitrim.

=== European elections ===
For elections to the European Parliament, the county is part of the Midlands–North-West constituency.

== Places of interest ==
- Cabra Castle
- Castle Saunderson
- Cathedral of Saint Patrick and Saint Felim
- Cavan County Museum
- Cloughoughter Castle
- Drumlane Monastery
- Killeshandra Church of the Rath
- Magh Slécht
- Saint Fethlimidh's Cathedral
- Saint Kilian Heritage Centre

=== Natural attractions ===
- Cuilcagh
- Dún na Rí Forest Park
- Killykeen Forest Park
- Lough Sheelin
- Marble Arch Caves Global Geopark
- Rockfield Lake
- Shannon-Erne Waterway

== Transport ==
=== Road ===
Two national primary routes pass through the county, The N3 road and the N16 road. The N3 is the longest route in Cavan, crossing the county for 60 km (37 mi) from the Meath border at Whitegate near Virginia and through Belturbet into Fermanagh. The N16 begins in Sligo and ends at Blacklion in the far northwestern tip of Cavan, it crosses the county for roughly 7 km (4.3 mi).

Three national secondary routes pass through the county. The N87 road begins in Belturbet and passes through Ballyconnell and Swanlinbar before crossing into County Fermanagh where it becomes the A32. The N54 route from Monaghan and Clones joins the N3 at Butlersbridge. The N55 links Cavan to Athlone via Ballinagh and Granard.

Bus Éireann provide bus services to villages and towns across the county, including a direct route from Cavan to Dublin Airport.

=== Rail ===
In the mid-1850s the Midland Great Western Railway built a line between the Inny Junction in County Westmeath (along their expanding network which was eventually to reach Sligo) and Cavan town. The first railway station to open in Cavan, was Cavan railway station in 1856. Many notable railway stations were built in the 19th century such as Kingscourt railway station and the Cavan and Leitrim Railway. The railways were an important part of the economic development of Cavan and carried passengers and freight to all over Ireland. The railways also helped the popularity of GAA in Cavan grow, spectators could travel easily between towns.

After World War II, due to the shortage of coal in the country, uneconomic lines were terminated. In 1947 all passenger services were terminated though the transport of freight and livestock continued. The Great Northern Railway (G.N.R.) continued to serve the Cavan and Leitrim Railway. However, in 1959 all services along the remaining rail lines were terminated and the stations along their routes were closed.

Belturbet railway station is open as a railway museum.

=== Water ===
In the historical context and before water levels in lakes were lowered, water transport in the region was once very important through the complex of lakes and waterways that fed into the major river systems such as the Erne, Shannon and Boyne. Today however this is mainly confined to leisure craft on the River Erne and Shannon-Erne Waterway from Belturbet and Ballyconnell as well as for angling activities. Cavan also has 365 lakes all around, one for everyday of the year.

== Sport ==
In Gaelic football, the dominant sport in the county, Cavan GAA competes annually in the All-Ireland Senior Football Championship, which it has won 5 times, between 1933 and 1952. The team is currently in division 2 of the National Football League. Cavan was the only county in Ireland without a senior hurling team, the county board having discontinued the team in 2011. The sport was on the decline and the senior team was disbanded to promote Hurling at junior level. Cavan's senior hurling team was reformed in 2017. They compete in division 3B of the National Hurling League and in the Lory Meagher Cup.

The first GAA club founded in Cavan was Ballyconnell in 1885. However the club didn't affiliate to GAA Central Council until March 1886 so that can be taken as the founding of the GAA in Cavan and Ulster. The most successful club in Cavan is Cornafean with 20 Senior Football Championship titles, their last title was won in 1956. Ramor United are the current senior football champions. No team from Cavan has ever won a national or provincial title.

There are several athletics club and facilities in Cavan, including a 300m Tartan track in Shercock. There are five athletics clubs in the county, including Annalee AC, Bailieborough AC, Innyvale AC, Laragh AC and Shercock AC.

Cavan has two rugby football clubs, County Cavan R.F.C. and Virginia R.F.C., both teams compete in the Ulster qualifying leagues.

Fishing is a very popular activity in Cavan because of its complex of large rivers and lakes.

Below is a list of various sporting clubs in Cavan:

Club	Sport	League
Cavan Gaels GAA	Gaelic Football	Cavan Senior Football Championship
Killinkere	Basketball	North East League
Bailieboro Celtic FC	Association football	Meath & District League
Mullahoran	Hurling	Cavan Senior Hurling Championship
County Cavan R.F.C.	Rugby	Ulster Rugby
Bailieborough AC	Athletics	Cavan County Championships
Cornafean GAA	Gaelic football	Cavan Junior Football Championship

== Demographics ==
Historical population
Year	Pop.	±%
1600	4,665	—
1610	8,911	+91.0%
1653	12,001	+34.7%
1659	14,703	+22.5%
1821	195,076	+1226.8%
1831	227,933	+16.8%
1841	243,158	+6.7%
1851	174,071	−28.4%
1861	153,906	−11.6%
1871	140,735	−8.6%
1881	129,476	−8.0%
1891	111,917	−13.6%
1901	97,541	−12.8%
1911	91,173	−6.5%
1926	82,452	−9.6%
1936	76,670	−7.0%
1946	70,355	−8.2%
1951	66,377	−5.7%
1956	61,740	−7.0%
1961	56,594	−8.3%
1966	54,022	−4.5%
1971	52,618	−2.6%
1979	53,720	+2.1%
1981	53,855	+0.3%
1986	53,965	+0.2%
1991	52,796	−2.2%
1996	52,944	+0.3%
2002	56,546	+6.8%
2006	64,003	+13.2%
2011	73,183	+14.3%
2016	76,176	+4.1%
2022	81,704	+7.3%

As of 2016 Cavan had a population of 76,176, a modest increase on the 2011 census. the 2016 census reported the county's most numerous non-Irish nationalities as UK, Poland and Lithuania respectively.

=== Religion ===
The 2016 census reported that of Cavan's 76,173 residents, 82% (62,393 people) identified as Roman Catholic. Other stated religions made up 11% of the population (8,671 people). 5% (3,904 people) stated that they followed no religion. 2% (1,209 people) did not state their religion.

The Cathedral of Saint Patrick and Saint Felim in Cavan town, is the seat of the Bishop of Kilmore and the mother church of the Roman Catholic Diocese of Kilmore. St Fethlimidh's Cathedral, near Cavan town in Kilmore, is one of two cathedral churches in the Diocese of Kilmore, Elphin and Ardagh of the Church of Ireland. The Cavan Baptist Church is located in Oldtown and the Islamic Cultural Centre, which is primarily used as a mosque, is located in Cavan town. There are two Methodist churches located in Ballyconnell and Corlespratten. There are a number of Presbyterian churches throughout the county and a restored 1800s Wesleyan Chapel in Bailieborough.

== Economy ==
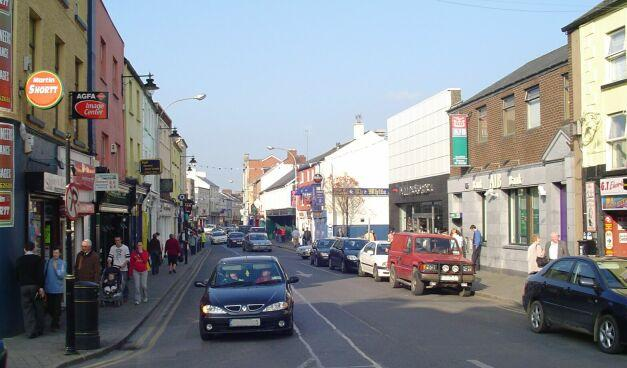
Cavan town is the most populous in the county

Agriculture is the largest industry in the county, especially dairy milk processing as well as pig and beef farming. Much of Cavan's land consists of clay soils, which are rich in minerals, but heavy and poorly drained, making pasture farming the dominant farming system in the county. There is a total farmed area of 144,269 hectares (356,500 acres) in the county, and there are approximately 219,568 cattle in Cavan. Lakeland Dairies Group, which is based in Killeshandra and has manufacturing sites located throughout Cavan, is Ireland's second largest dairy co-operative with an annual revenue of €545 million.

Cavan is one of Ireland's leading counties for pig production, with the county's farms raising a fifth of the national pig herd. Pig farming regulations have put pressure on the industry, which is highly dependent on affordable credit. Traditionally an agricultural economy, Cavan has since expanded in other industries, chiefly quarrying, energy production and manufacturing facilities. As of September 2014, Cavan produced 113.14 MW of wind energy, on 9 windfarms. The largest wind farm was in Bindoo townland, with a capacity of 48 MW. Peat cutting exists in the northwest of the county, in the Cuilcagh range. Major industries such as Quinn Quaries and Gypsum Industries are also important employers within the county. There are a number of quarries located in the county and the Quinn cement facility is located in Ballyconnell.

Average Disposable Income per Person in Cavan is €17,251, roughly €4,000 behind Dublin, Ireland's richest county and 89.3% of the state average. The county has seen a significant drop in average disposable income since the 2006 Census.

== Notable people ==
- Gerard Beirne – writer
- Henry Brooke – writer
- Charlotte Brooke – writer
- Timothy J. Campbell – Cavan-born American lawyer and politician from New York
- Dallán Forgaill (Saint Dallán or Eochaid mac Colla) – early Christian poet, writer, and martyr to whom the original Old Irish words of the hymn "Be Thou My Vision" are often attributed
- Marcus Daly – Cavan-born American businessman known as one of the three "Copper Kings" of Butte, Montana, United States
- Séamus Dolan – Fianna Fáil politician
- Eric Dorman-Smith – British Army Brigadier in WWII, later member of the Irish Republican Army
- Thomas "Broken-Hand" Fitzpatrick – famous "mountain man", U.S. Indian Agent, trailblazer and fur trapper
- Michael Harding – writer
- Margaret Jane Scott Hawthorne – tailor, trade unionist and factory inspector
- Cathal Buí Mac Giolla Ghunna ("Yellow Cathal McElgunn") – poet, wrote the famous poem "An Bonnán Buí" ("The Yellow Bittern")
- Tom MacIntyre – writer
- Saint Kilian (640–689), missionary and martyr in Würzburg, Germany; born Mullagh
- Leona Maguire – professional golfer
- Neven Maguire – chef and television personality, Blacklion
- Adrian Martin (chef) – chef and television personality, Bawnboy
- Owen Roe McGovern – former Cavan Gaelic footballer
- Thomas McGovern – former Roman Catholic Bishop of Harrisburg, Pennsylvania
- John William Nixon – District Inspector with both the R.I.C. and the R.U.C. and, later, a Stormont MP.
- Agnes O'Farrelly – academic, writer and political activist
- Lisa O'Neill – singer-songwriter
- Patrick O'Rorke – US Union Army colonel, killed at Gettysburg, born Cavan
- James Owens – recipient of the Victoria Cross
- Mary Anne Sadlier – writer
- Edward James Saunderson – Irish Unionist MP and Privy Councillor
- Brendan Smith TD – former Minister for Agriculture, Fisheries and Food and former Minister for Justice and Law Reform
- John P. Wilson TD – All Ireland SFC Winner and Tánaiste from 1990 to 1993

== See also ==
- List of abbeys and priories in Ireland (County Cavan)
- Lord Lieutenant of Cavan
- High Sheriff of Cavan
- Ralaghan Man
