= Meath Intermediate Hurling Championship =

Annual hurling competition for intermediate clubs in Meath

- Irish: Craobh Iomána Idirmheánach na Mí
- Code: Hurling
- Founded: 1940; 86 years ago
- Region: Meath (GAA)
- No. of teams: 12
- Title holders: Rathmolyon (1st title)
- Sponsors: JM Food Services
- Official website: Meath GAA

The Meath Intermediate Hurling Championship (known for sponsorship reasons as the JM Food Services Meath Intermediate Hurling Championship and abbreviated to the Meath IHC) is an annual hurling competition organised by the Meath County Board of the Gaelic Athletic Association from 1940 for the top tier intermediate hurling teams in the county of Meath in Ireland. It is the third tier overall in the entire Meath hurling championship system.

In its current format, the Meath Intermediate Championship begins with a group stage. The 12 participating club teams are divided into two groups of six teams and play each other in a round-robin system. The top three teams in both groups proceed to the knockout phase that culminates with the final match at Páirc Tailteann. The winner of the Kildare Intermediate Championship qualifies for the subsequent Leinster Club JHC.

Rathmolyon are the 2026 title holders, having defeated Clann na nGael by 2–17 to 1–09 in the final.

== History ==
The Meath Intermediate Championship was established in 1940 in an effort to bridge the standard of play between the Meath Senior Championship and the Meath Junior Championship. The championship was abandoned a year later but was revived in 1960. For almost 65 years, the Meath Intermediate Championship was effectively the second tier championship in the Meath hurling championship system.

A review of Meath's hurling structures resulted in county committee delegates approving major changes to the championship format in February 2024. Five different format proposals were put before delegates with one winning unanimous favour and no support for the remaining four. The new format saw the introduction of the Meath IBHC for teams who fail to qualify for the knockout stage of the Meath IHC.

In 2026 the format was changed again to place the 6 best teams in the main IHC and the 6 subsequent teams in the IHCB with promotion and relegation between the two leagues. Source: "Meath GAA Regulations 2026-V1" (PDF). Meath GAA.

== Teams ==
=== 2026 teams ===
The 6 teams competing in the 2026 Meath Intermediate Hurling Championship were:

Club	Location	Position in 2026
Clann na nGael	Ráth Chairn and Athboy	Runners-up
Donaghmore Ashbourne	Ashbourne	5th
Drumree	Drumree	Semi-Final
Gaeil Colmcille	Kells	Relegated to IHC B
Rathmolyon	Rathmolyon	Champion
St Peters Dunboyne	Dunboyne	4th

The 6 teams competing in the 2026 Meath Intermediate Hurling Championship B were:

Club	Location	
Boardsmill	Boardsmill	Champion
Kildalkey	Kildalkey	Relegation Play-off
Kilmessan	Kilmessan	Relegated
Kiltale	Kiltale	4th
Trim	Trim	Semi-Final
Wolfe Tones	Kilberry	Runners-up

== List of IHC A finals ==
Year	Club	Score	Club	Score	Venue	#
2026	Rathmolyon	2-17	Clann na nGael	1-09	Kiltale	
2025	Kilskyre/Moylagh	2-14	Rathmolyon	0-12	Páirc Tailteann	
2024	Navan O'Mahonys	1–15	Drumree	1–10	Páirc Tailteann	
2023	Kildalkey	1–18	Navan O'Mahonys	1–10	Páirc Tailteann	

== List of IHC B finals ==
Year	Club	Score	Club	Score	Venue	#
2026	Boardsmill	2-15	Wolfe Tones	1-15	Athboy	

== See also ==
- Meath Senior Hurling Championship (Tier 1)
- Meath Senior B Hurling Championship (Tier 2)
