= 2024 Meath Senior Hurling Championship =

Annual hurling competition season

- Dates: 10 July - 13 October 2024
- Teams: 12
- Sponsor: Ted Murtagh Clothing & Footwear
- Champions: Ratoath (2nd title); Jack McGowan (captain); Mike Cole (manager)
- Runners-up: Trim
- Relegated: St Peter's Dunboyne

Tournament statistics
- Matches played: 35
- Goals scored: 116 (3.31 per match)
- Points scored: 1264 (36.11 per match)
- Top scorer(s): Pádraig O'Hanrahan (1-72)

The 2024 Meath Senior Hurling Championship was the 121st staging of the Meath Senior Hurling Championship since its establishment by the Meath County Board in 1887. The draw for the group stage fixtures took place on 20 March 2024. The championship ran from 10 July to 13 October 2024.

Kildalkey entered the championship as the defending champions, however, they were beaten by Trim in the semi-finals.

The final was played on 13 October 2024 at Páirc Tailteann in Navan, between Ratoath and Trim, in what was their third meeting in the final overall and a first meeting in two years. Ratoath won the match by 2–15 to 1–16 to claim their second championship title overall and a first title in 61 years.

Ratoath's Pádraig O'Hanrahan was the championship's top scorer with 1-72.

== Format change ==
County committee delegates approved major changes to the championship format in February 2024. Five different format proposals were put before delegates with one winning unanimous favour and no support for the remaining four. The new format saw two groups of six teams, with a seeded draw. The top three team in each group play in the SHC knockout stage and the bottom three teams in each group advances to the Senior B Hurling Championship. The losing SBHC quarter-finalists play in the relegation playoff.

== Group A ==
=== Group A table ===
SHC semi-finalists SHC quarter-finalists Senior B hurling

Team	Matches				Score			Pts
Team	Pld	W	D	L	For	Against	Diff	Pts
Trim	5	4	0	1	151	93	58	8
Kilmessan	5	4	0	1	134	95	39	8
Kildalkey	5	4	0	1	168	83	85	8
Clann na nGael	5	2	0	3	109	127	-18	4
Dunderry	5	1	0	4	83	173	-90	2
St Peters Dunboyne	5	0	0	5	88	162	-74	0

=== Group A results ===
11 July 2024 Round 1	Clann na nGael	0-20 - 0-27	Kilmessan	Páirc Tailteann
	E Og O Donnchadha and J Ennis 0-7 each, C O'Sullivan 0-2, D O Donnchadha, K Swaine, J McGrath, E Kelleher 0-1 each.	Report	L Horan 0-13, M Horan and S Doyle 0-4 each, D Horan 0-2, K Gorman, A O'Neill and M Mulhall 0-1 each

12 July 2024 Round 1	Dunderry	1-19 - 0-19	St Peter's Dunboyne	Páirc Tailteann
	E Nolan 0-7 (6 frees), D Ó Laoire 0-5, D O Driscoll 1-0, M Leavy 0-2, S Coogan 0-2, J Martyn 0-2, J Duffy 0-1.	Report	S Quigley 0-10, D Rohan 0-3, N Smyth and E McCormack 0-2 each, S Cunningham and L Callanan 0-1

13 July 2024 Round 1	Kildalkey	1-13 - 1-20	Trim	Páirc Tailteann
	N Potterton 1-7, L Rickard and P Barnwell 0-2 each, B McKeon and B O'Halloran 0-1 each	Report	J Murray 0-10, M Cole 1-2, D Heffernan 0-3, J harris 0-2, D Higgins, J Cole and M Molloy 0-1 each

25 July 2024 Round 2	Trim	4-21 - 1-08	Dunderry	Donnelly & Loughran Memorial Park
	K Ennis (1-12 1-11 frees); M Cole (2-2), C Quigley (1-4); J Cole (0-4 two frees), M Molloy (0-4); D Murtagh (0-2), C Casserly (0-1), G Douglas (0-1), J Harris (0-1).	Report	D O Laoire (1-1); S Coogan (0-3), E Nolan (0-3 frees), D O'Driscoll (0-1).

26 July 2024 Round 2	Kilmessan	2-10 - 3-12	Kildalkey	St Loman's Park
	L Horan (0-7 six frees), E Harkin (1-2), S Doyle (0-1).	Report	N Potterton (0-11, seven frees, one 65), B O'Halloran (3-0); M Healy (0-1).

28 July 2024 Round 2	St Peter's Dunboyne	0-21 - 3-18	Clann na nGael	Páirc na nGael
	S Quigley 0-15, A Watters 0-1, L Callanan 0-1, J Mitchell 0-1, E McCormack 0-1, S Cunningham 0-1, S McCormack 0-1.		J Ennis 0-7, E Ó Donnchadha 1-2, C McGovern 1-1, W Gleeson 0-4, D Ó Donnchadha 1-0, C O'Sullivan 0-3, G Breathnach 0-1.

2 August 2024 Round 3	St Peter's Dunboyne	0-15 - 1-28	Kilmessan	Seán Eiffe Park
	S Quigley (0-11, eight frees, one 65’), C Smyth (0-1), D Delaney (0-1); N Smyth (0-1), N Hackett (0-1).	Report	M Horan (1-10, one free), D Horan (0-5); K Gorman (0-4); D Smyth (0-3), L Horan (0-2, two frees), E Harkin (0-1), A O’Neil (0-1), K Donnelly (0-1), M Mulhall (0-1).

3 August 2024 Round 3	Dunderry	1-14 - 6-31	Kildalkey	Athboy Grounds
	M Leavy 0-5, E Nolan 0-5 (3f), C Cooagn 1-1, C Leavy 0-2, S Coogan 0-1.	Report	C Fitzgerald (3-2), P Barnwell (2-2), N Potterton (0-8)(5f), B O Halloran (0-6), N McNally (1-1), P Conneely (0-3), B McKeon (0-2), E Fitzgerald (0-2), G Kelly (0-2), B Kelly (0-1), L Rickard (0-1), J Kavanagh (0-1).

4 August 2024 Round 3	Trim	5-15 - 1-19	Clann na nGael	Boardsmill Grounds
	J Murray 1-11, M Cole 3-0, J Harris 1-0, K Ennis 0-2, D Murtagh and M Molloy 0-1 each	Report	J Ennis 1-8, E Og O Donnchadha 0-6, W Gleeson and C McGovern 0-2 each, E Fitzsimons 0-1

16 August 2024 Round 4	Kildalkey	6-31 - 2-09	St Peter's Dunboyne	St Loman's Park
	N Potterton 2-4, B O'Halloran 1-6, E Fitzgerald 1-4, P Barnwell 0-7, N McNally 1-2, C Fitzgerald 1-1, L Rickard 0-3, D Harmon 0-2, B Kelly 0-1, G Kelly 0-1.	Report	S Quigley 1-4, C Murphy 1-2, F Chawe 0-1, D Rohan 0-1, L Callanan 0-1.

17 August 2024 Round 4	Clann na nGael	2-22 - 2-10	Dunderry	Fr Plunkett Memorial Park
	E Óg Ó Donnchadha 1-7, J Ennis 0-6, G Breathnach 1-1, C O'Sullivan 0-4, C McGovern 0-1, D Ó Donnchadha 0-1, J McGrath 0-1, K Swaine 0-1.		D O'Driscoll 2-0, E Nolan 0-6, C Coogan 0-1, M Leavy 0-1, J Leavy 0-1, J Martyn 0-1.

17 August 2024 Round 4	Kilmessan	4-14 - 1-19	Trim	Páirc Tailteann
	E Harkin (3-0), S Doyle (1-1), D Smyth (0-4 one free), M Horan (0-3 two frees), D Horan (0-3); K Gorman (0-2), D Reilly (0-1 one free).	Report	J Murray (1-6, 6f), D Murtagh (0-3), M Cole (0-3), J Andrews (0-2), C Quigley (0-2), J Cole (0-1), M Molloy (0-1), J Harris (0-1).

31 August 2024 Round 5	Kildalkey	4-21 - 1-09	Clann na nGael	Longwood Grounds
	B O'Halloran 3-3, N Potterton 0-8, P Barnwell 1-2, B Kelly 0-2, C Fitzgerald 0-2, D Harmon 0-1, M Healy 0-1, E Fitzgerald 0-1, N McNally 0-1.		E Óg Ó Donnchadha 1-2, J Ennis 0-4, C O'Sullivan 0-2, W Gleeson 0-1.

31 August 2024 Round 5	Dunderry	1-15 - 3-25	Kilmessan	Páirc Tailteann
	E Nolan 0-9, C Leavy 0-4, M Leavy 1-0, A Kelly 0-2.		S Doyle 0-9, K Keena 2-1, M Horan 1-2, D Reilly 0-4, K Gorman 0-4, L Byrne 0-2, M Mulhall 0-2, A O'Neill 0-1.

31 August 2024 Round 5	Trim	3-24 - 1-15	St Peter's Dunboyne	Páirc na nGael
	J Murray 2-11, J Cole 1-1, C Quigley 0-3, M Cole 0-2, K Ennis 0-2, J Andrews 0-2, P Ryan 0-1, D Murtagh 0-1, M Molloy 0-1.		S Quigley 0-9, J Mitchell 1-0, N Smyth 0-3, E McCormack 0-1, L Callanan 0-1, S Cunningham 0-1.

== Group B ==
=== Group B table ===
SHC semi-finalists SHC quarter-finalists Senior B hurling

Team	Matches				Score			Pts
Team	Pld	W	D	L	For	Against	Diff	Pts
Ratoath	5	4	1	0	152	78	74	9
Kiltale	5	4	1	0	138	77	61	9
Killyon	5	3	0	2	100	110	-10	6
Longwood	5	1	1	3	113	113	-10	3
Na Fianna	5	1	1	3	93	121	-28	3
Blackhall Gaels	5	0	0	5	72	169	-97	0

=== Group B results ===
10 July 2024 Round 1	Ratoath	0-17 - 0-17	Kiltale	Páirc Tailteann
	P O’Hanrahan 0-6, G McGowan 0-4, C O’Hanrahan 0-3, J Lanigan 0-2, C Rogers 0–2	Report	J Regan 0-13, D Donoghue, P Garvey, P Durnin and D O’Doherty 0-1 each.

13 July 2024 Round 1	Blackhall Gaels	0-17 - 2-28	Longwood	Páirc Tailteann
	D Carty 0-6, S Morris and L Jennins 0-3 each, C Delany, M Nicholson, P Kelly, J Kelly and D Sherrin 0-1 each	Report	S Cole 0-9, A Healy 1-4, D Healy and K Heagney 0-4 each, K Ennis 1-1, R Moore 0-3, B Hogan 0-2, G Griffith 0-1

14 July 2024 Round 1	Killyon	3-14 - 1-13	Na Fianna	Páirc Tailteann
	K Keogan 1-7, D Farrell 1-2, A Farrell 1-1, D Raleigh 0-3, J Coyne 0-1	Report	R Fagan 1-3, S Martin 0-4, P Jordan 0-2, W Flynn, M Heffernan, E Bright and R Byrne 0-1 each

26 July 2024 Round 2	Na Fianna	0-12 - 3-25	Ratoath	Batterstown Grounds
	B Slevin 1-7 (1-4 fs); W Flynn 0-2; S Martin 0-1; J McCloskey 0-1; S Slevin 0-1; E Devine 0-1.	Report	P O'Hanrahan 0-14; G McGowan 2-1; C O'Hanrahan 1-0; N McLarnon 0-3; D McGowan 0-2; J McGowan 0-2; P Byrne 0-1; B McMahon 0-1; S Corbett 0-1.

27 July 2024 Round 2	Longwood	0-20 - 2-19	Killyon	Boardsmill Grounds
	A Healy (0-9 eight frees, one 65), S Coloe (0-5), K Heagney (0-2), C Dixon (0-1), K Ennis (0-1), R Moore (0-1), R Kerrigan (0-1).	Report	K Keoghan (1-7 six frees, one 65), D Farrell (1-1), D Raleigh (0-3); J Coyne (0-3), B Quinn (0-2); J Connolly (0-2), C McKeown (0-1).

27 July 2024 Round 2	Kiltale	4-32 - 2-08	Blackhall Gaels	Rathmolyon Grounds
	J Regan 1-13, P Durnin 1-3, D O'Doherty 1-3, J Bannon 1-2, C Ryan 0-5, P Kelly 0-3, C Brien 0-1, C McCabe 0-1, E Ryan 0-1.		P Kelly 1-1, S Morris 1-0, D Carty 0-3, M Nicholson 0-1, T Murphy 0-1, C Whitty 0-1, J Kelly 0-1.

1 August 2024 Round 3	Blackhall Gaels	0-14 - 3-32	Ratoath	Donnelly-Loughran Memorial Park
	D Carty 0-10 six frees, S Morris (0-2), S Whitty (0-1); P Kelly (0-1).	Report	P O’Hanrahan (1-12) seven frees, C Rogers (1-5), G McGowan (1-4), S Corbett (0-2), J McGowan (0-2); N McLarnon (0-2); D McGowan (0-2), C Kelly (0-1); L Kelly (0-1), C O’Hanrahan (0-1).

2 August 2024 Round 3	Kiltale	1-22 - 1-13	Killyon	St Loman's Park
	J Regan (0-10); J Kelly (1-1), P Kelly (0-4), D O'Doherty (0-2), C Brien (0-1), P Garvey (0-1), C Ryan (0-1), C McCabe (0-1), L O'Halloran (0-1).	Report	K Keoghan (0-9), D Farrell (1-0), C McKeown (0-3), D Raleigh (0-1).

4 August 2024 Round 3	Longwood	2-16 - 1-19	Na Fianna	Rathmolyon Grounds
	A Healy (1-7 frees), S Coloe (0-6),	Report	Patrick Jordan (1-5), Kean Flynn (0-3), Ronan Byrne (0-1), Oisin Bright (0-1), Luke Kelly (0-1), Will Flynn (0-1).

16 August 2024 Round 4	Killyon	0-24 - 1-09	Blackhall Gaels	Rathmolyon Grounds
	K Keoghan (0-10, seven frees, two 65s), J Connolly (0-4), D Farrell (0-4); D Raleigh (0-2), J Coyne (0-1), P Coyne (0-1), A Farrell (0-1).	Report	D Carty (0-8 seven frees, one 65), S Morris (1-0), P Kelly (0-1).

17 August 2024 Round 4	Ratoath	2-18 - 1-20	Longwood	Páirc Tailteann
	P O'Hanrahan (0-10 eight frees, one sideline cut), C Rogers (1-2), T Fadden (1-0), N McLarnon (0-2); D Kelly (0-2 one free), J McGowan (0-2).	Report	R Moore (1-6), S Coloe (0-7 two frees), A Healy (0-4 two frees), B Hogan (0-3).

18 August 2024 Round 4	Na Fianna	0-16 - 0-27	Kiltale	Batterstown Grounds
	R Fagan (0-8 four frees); K Slattery (0-2), B Slevin (0-1), E Bright (0-1), P Slevin (0-1), M Heffernon (0-1), E Mulally (0-1); P Jordan (0-1).	Report	J Regan (0-10, seven frees; P Durnin (0-8), P Kelly (0-3), P Garvey (0-2), D O’Doherty (0-1), J Bannon (0-1); C Ryan (0-1), J Kelly (0-1).

1 September 2024 Round 5	Ratoath	4-25 - 0-12	Killyon	Páirc Tailteann
	P O'Hanrahan 0-12, C Rogers 2-4, S Corbett 1-3, N McLarnon 1-0, D McGowan 0-3, B McGowan 0-1, D Kelly 0-1, C O'Hanrahan 0-1.		K Keoghan 0-7, D Farrell 0-3, D Raleigh 0-1, T Raleigh 0-1.

1 September 2024 Round 5	Blackhall Gaels	2-09 - 1-24	Na Fianna	Donnelly-Loughran Memorial Park
	D Carty 1-3, M Mullally 1-0, S Whitty 0-3, S Morris 0-1, C Burke 0-1, T Delaney 0-1.		R Fagan 0-8, S Martin 0-5, B Slevin 1-1, K Flynn 0-4, E Bright 0-2, E Devine 0-2, P Jordan 0-2.

1 September 2024 Round 5	Kiltale	2-19 - 1-11	Longwood	Athboy Grounds
	K Regan 0-8, P Durnin 1-2, P Kelly 1-1, E Ryan 0-3, J Kelly 0-2, D O'Doherty 0-1, C Ryan 0-1, P Garvey 0-1.		A Healy 1-8, D Healy 0-2, M Burke 0-1.

== Knockout stage ==
=== Quarter-finals ===
14 September 2024 Quarter-final	Dunderry	1-16 - 2-10	Blackhall Gaels	St Loman's Park
	E Nolan 0-6 frees, A Kelly 1-2, D Ó Laoire 0-1, M Leavy 0-1, J Martyn 0-1, C Leavy 0-1, W Tracey 0-1, C Coogan 0-1, S Coogan 0-1, D O'Driscoll 0-1.	Report

15 September 2024 Quarter-final	Na Fianna	3-17 - 1-09	St Peter's Dunboyne	St Loman's Park
		Report

=== Relegation playoff ===
29 September 2024 Playoff	St Peter's Dunboyne	0-15 - 1-13	Blackhall Gaels	Seán Eiffe Park
		Report

=== Semi-finals ===
28 September 2024 Semi-final	Clann na nGael	0-18 - 1-21	Na Fianna	Longwood Grounds

29 September 2024 Semi-final	Longwood	1-24 - 5-07	Dunderry	St Loman's Park
	A Healy 1-8, K Ennis 0-4, B Hogan 0-3, D Healy 0-3, S Coloe 0-2, R Moore 0-2, C Dixon 0-1, M Burke 0-1.	Report	A Kelly 2-2, E Nolan 0-5 ( 4f & 1 x 65), M Leavy 1-0, J Leavy 1-0, C Leavy 1-0.

=== Final ===
12 October 2024 Final	Longwood	1-13 - 0-14	Na Fianna	St Loman's Park
		Report

=== Quarter-finals ===
14 September 2024 Quarter-final	Kilmessan	3-18 - 1-14	Killyon	Páirc Tailteann
	L Horan (0-9 seven frees, one penalty), K Gorman (1-3); K Keena (1-0), D Smyth (1-0), D Horan (0-2); S Doyle (0-2 one free), L Byrne (0-1), P Lally (0-1);	Report	A Gannon (1-4), K Keoghan (0-5 four frees), D Farrell (0-2); D Raleigh (0-2), C McKeown (0-1).

15 September 2024 Quarter-final	Kiltale	1-13 - 2-20	Kildalkey	Páirc Tailteann
	J Regan 1-3, E Ryan 0-2, A Rooney 0-2, C McCabe 0-1, P Durnin 0-1, M O’Sullivan 0-1, C Gilsenan 0-1, J Kelly 0-1	Report	N Potterton 1-9, C Fitzgerald 1-0, N McNally 0-2, P Barnwell 0-2, B McKeon 0-2, G Kelly 0-2, M Healy 0-1, L Rickard 0-1, E Fitzgerald 0-1

=== Semi-finals ===
28 September 2024 Semi-final	Trim	2-19 - 2-13	Kildalkey	Páirc Tailteann
	J Murray 1-6, M Cole 1-2, A Douglas 0-3, M Molloy 0-2, D Higgins, J Toner, D Murtagh, and P Ryan 0-1 each	Report	N Potterton 1-7, N McNally 1-2, D Harmon, E Fitzgerald, B O’Halloran and P Connelly 0-1 each

29 September 2024 Semi-final	Ratoath	1-21 - 1-11	Kilmessan	Páirc Tailteann
	P O’Hanrahan 0-10, C Rogers 0-4, G McGowan 1-1, D McGowan 0-3, S Corbett, B McMahon and C O’Hanrahan 0-1 each	Report	S Doyle 0-4, J Cottrell 1-0, D Reilly 0-3, M Horan 0-2, L Horan 0-1, K Donnelly 0-1.

=== Final ===
13 October 2024 Final	Trim	1-16 - 2-15	Ratoath	Páirc Tailteann
	J Murray (0-9, 6 frees); A Douglas (1-1); D Murtagh, C Quigley (0-2 each); D Higgins, J Cole (0-1 each).	Report	P O'Hanrahan (0-8, 4 frees, 2 65s); G McGowan (0-4); D McGowan, J McGowan (1-0 each); S Corbett (0-2); L Kelly (0-1).	Referee: C Ferguson (Gaeil Colmcille)

== Championship statistics ==
=== Top scorers ===
Rank	Player	Club	Tally	Total	Matches	Average
1	Pádraig O'Hanrahan	Ratoath	1-72	75	7	10.71
2	Nicky Potterton	Kildalkey	5-54	69	7	9.85
3	James Murray	Trim	3-59	68	6	11.33
4	Jack Regan	Kiltale	2-57	63	6	10.50
5	Seán Quigley	St Peter's Dunboyne	1-49	52	5	10.40
