= Meath Senior B Hurling Championship =

Annual hurling competition for senior clubs in Meath

- Irish: Craobh Iomána Sinsear B An Mhí
- Code: Hurling
- Founded: 2024; 2 years ago
- Region: Meath (GAA)
- Trophy: Kit Mitchell Memorial Cup
- No. of teams: 6
- Title holders: Kilskyre/Moylagh (1st title)
- First winner: Longwood
- Sponsors: Ted Murtagh Clothing & Footwear
- Official website: Meath GAA

The Meath Senior B Hurling Championship (known for sponsorship reasons as the Ted Murtagh Clothing & Footwear Meath Senior B Hurling Championship and abbreviated to the Meath SBHC) is an annual hurling competition organised by the Meath County Board of the Gaelic Athletic Association from 2024 for the second tier senior hurling teams in the county of Meath in Ireland.

Kilskyre/Moylagh are the title holders after defeating Dunderry by 2–19 to 1–13 in the 2026 final.

== History ==
The Meath Intermediate Championship was established in 1940 in an effort to bridge the standard of play between the Meath Senior Championship and the Meath Junior Championship. For almost 85 years, the Meath Intermediate Championship was effectively the second tier championship in the Meath hurling championship system.

A review of Meath's hurling structures resulted in county committee delegates approving major changes to the championship format in February 2024. Five different format proposals were put before delegates with one winning unanimous favour and no support for the remaining four. The new format saw introduction of the Meath SBHC for teams who fail to qualify for the knockout stage of the Meath SHC.

The very first match in the inaugural championship took place on 14 September 2024, with Dunderry beating Blackhall Gaels by 1–16 to 2–10. Longwood won the inaugural championship after beating Na Fianna in the final.

== Format ==
=== Group stage ===
The six teams play each other team once. Teams are ranked following GAA Official Code. The 1st team qualifies directly for the Final the 2nd and 3rd team qualify for a Semi-Final. The 5th and 6th placed teams proceed to a relegation play-off.

=== Knockout stage ===
Semi-finals: The 2nd and 3rd placed team of the group stage contest this round. The winner from this game advance to the final.

Final: The 1st placed team from the group stage and the semi-final winner contest the final. The winning team are declared champions and are promoted to the Meath Senior Hurling Championship.

=== Relegation ===
The 5th and 6th placed team take part in a relegation playoff to determine who drops to the Meath Intermediate Hurling Championship.This round is not played if the gap between 5th and 6th placed team is more than 3 points.

== Teams ==
The following 6 teams contested the 2026 championship

Club		Position in 2026
Kilskyre/Moylagh	Kilskeer & Moylagh	Champion
Dunderry	Dunderry	Runners-up
Longwood	Longwood	Semi-Finalist
Killyon	Killyon	4th place
Navan O'Mahonys	Navan	5th place
Blackhall Gaels	Batterstown and Kilcloon	Relegated

== Roll of honour ==
=== By club ===
#	Club	Titles	Runners-up	Championships won	Championships runner-up
1	Longwood	1	1	2024	2025
1	Killyon	1	0	2025	—
1	Kilskyre/Moylagh	1	0	2026	—
4	Na Fianna	0	1	—	2024
4	Dunderry	0	1	—	2026

== List of finals ==
=== List of Meath SBHC finals ===
Year	Winners	Score	Runners-up	Score	Venue	#
2026	Kilskyre/Moylagh	2-19	Dunderry	1-13	Boardsmill	
2025	Killyon	3-13	Longwood	1-12	Páirc Tailteann	
2024	Longwood	1-13	Na Fianna	0-14	St Loman's Park	

=== Notes ===
- 2025 - The first match ended in a draw: Killyon 0-13, Longwood 0-13.

== See also ==
- Meath Senior Hurling Championship (Tier 1)
- Meath Intermediate Hurling Championship (Tier 3)
