= 2025 Meath Senior Hurling Championship =

Annual hurling competition season

- Dates: 23 July - 25 October 2025
- Teams: 12
- Sponsor: Ted Murtagh Clothing & Footwear
- Champions: Ratoath (3rd title)
- Runners-up: Kiltale

Tournament statistics
- Matches played: 35

The 2025 Meath Senior Hurling Championship was the 122nd staging of the Meath Senior Hurling Championship since its establishment by the Meath County Board in 1887. The championship ran from 23 July to 25 October 2025. The draw took place in January 2025.

Ratoath entered the championship as the defending champions.

Ratoath defended their title after defeating Kiltale in the replay of the final after the first game was drawn. This marked their 3rd title in total.

== Format ==
County committee delegates approved major changes to the championship format in the previous year in February 2024. The new format saw two groups of six teams, with a seeded draw. The top three team in each group play in the SHC knockout stage and the bottom three teams in each group advances to the Senior B Hurling Championship. The losing SBHC quarter-finalists play in the relegation playoff.

== Knock-out stage ==
=== Quarter-Finals ===
| 20 September 2025 Quarter-Final | Kiltale | 4-26 - 0-13 | Na Fianna | Páirc Tailteann |
| | Jack Regan 3-13, Peter Durnin 1-1, James Kelly 0-4, Mark Slevin 0-5, Fearghal McCabe 0-2, Rory Fagan 0-2, Peter Slevin 0-2, Jack Bannon 0-1, Adam Murphy 0-1, Mark O'Sullivan 0-1, Ross Ryan 0-1, Hugh O'Sullivan 0-1, Eamon Ryan 0-1 | Report | Mark Slevin 0-5, Michael Heffernan 0-3, Rory Fagan 0-2, Peter Slevin 0-2, Oisin Bright 0-1, Shane Walsh 0-1 |

| 21 September 2025 Quarter-Final | Trim | 1-20 - 2-15 | Kildalkey | Páirc Tailteann |
| | James Murray 0-8, Kyle Ennis 0-4, Conor Quigley 0-3, Darragh Heffernan 1-1, Joey Cole 0-1, Mark Molloy 0-1, David Murtagh 0-1, George Douglas 0-1, Daniel Murray 0-1 | Report | Conor Kearney 1-2, Paddy Conneely 0-5, Evan Fitzgerald 0-3, Luke Rickard 0-3, Niall McNally 0-2, Nicky Potterton 1-0, Brin Kelly 0-1 |

=== Semi-Finals ===
| 5 October 2025 Semi-Final | Kiltale | 2-20 - 0-13 | Kilmessan | Páirc Tailteann |
| | Jack Regan 0-10, James Kelly 1-4, Peter Durnin 1-1, Conor Ryan 0-2, Philip Garvey 0-1, Mark O'Sullivan 0-1, Hugh O'Sullivan 0-1 | Report | Mark Horan 0-5, Lorcan O'Connor 0-2, Shane Brennan 0-1, Paddy Lally 0-1, Luke Horan 0-1, Finn Conroy 0-1, Kris Gorman 0-1, Seanie Doyle 0-1 |

| 5 October 2025 Semi-Final | Ratoath | 5-18 - 0-22 | Trim | Páirc Tailteann |
| | Cian Rogers 2-6, Padraic O'Hanrahan 1-7, Daithi McGowan 1-2, Bryan McMahon 1-0, Gavin McGowan 0-2, Domhnall Rogers 0-1 | Report | James Murray 0-13, Mikey Cole 0-2, George Douglas 0-2, James Toher 0-1, Darragh Heffernan 0-1, Conor Quigley 0-1, Kyle Ennis 0-1 |

=== Final ===
| 19 October 2025 Final Replay | Ratoath | 4-16 - 3-19 | Kiltale | Páirc Tailteann |
| | Gavin McGowan 2-2, Padraig O'Hanrahan 0-6, Daithi McGowan 0-5, Cian Rogers 1-2, Bryan McMahon 1-0, Cian Kelly 0-1 | Report | Jack Regan 0-7, Peter Durnin 1-4, Fearghal McCabe 1-1, Ross Ryan 1-1, Hugh O'Sullivan 0-2, Jack Bannon 0-2, Mark O'Sullivan 0-2 |

| 25 October 2025 Final Replay | Ratoath | 2-22 - 4-10 | Kiltale | Páirc Tailteann |
| | Podge O'Hanrahan 0-8 (5f), Bryan McMahon 1-2, Cian Rogers 1-2, Daithi McGowan 0-3, Gavin McGowan 0-2, Darragh Kelly 0-2, Niall McLarnon 0-2, Jack McGowan 0-1. | Report | Jack Regan 2-3 (0-2f), Adam Murphy 1-2, Hugh O'Sullivan 1-1, Jack Bannon 0-1, Philip Garvey 0-1, Peter Durnin 0-1, Anthony Forde 0-1. | Referee: Stephen Masterson |
