= List of towns and villages in County Meath =

List of towns and villages in a county of Ireland

This is a list of towns and villages in County Meath, Ireland.

== A ==
- Agher
- Ashbourne
- Athboy

== B ==
- Ballivor
- Batterstown
- Bellewstown
- Bettystown

== C ==
- Carlanstown
- Carnaross
- Clonard
- Clonee
- Curraha

== D ==
- Donaghpatrick
- Donore
- Drogheda (southern environs)
- Drumconrath
- Drumone
- Drumree
- Duleek
- Dunboyne
- Dunshaughlin
- Dunderry

== E ==
- Enfield

== G ==
- Gormanston

== J ==
- Julianstown

== K ==
- Kells
- Kilcloon
- Kildalkey
- Kilmainhamwood
- Kilmessan
- Kilskeer

== L ==
- Laytown
- Longwood

== M ==
- Mornington
- Mosney
- Moynalty

== N ==
- Navan
- Nobber

== O ==
- Oldcastle

== R ==
- Ráth Cairn
- Rathmolyon
- Ratoath

== S ==
- Skryne
- Slane
- Stackallan
- Stamullen
- Summerhill

== T ==
- Trim

== Y ==
- Yellow Furze
