= Rathmolyon GAA =

Gaelic sports club in County Galway, Ireland

Rathmolyon
- Ráth Maigh Liadhain
- Founded: 1963
- County: Meath
- Nickname: The Village
- Colours
- Grounds: Rathmolyon Grounds

Playing kits
Standard colours

Senior Club Championships
	All Ireland	Leinster champions	Meath champions
Hurling:	0	0	3

Rathmolyon GAA is a Gaelic Athletic Association club in Rathmolyon, County Meath, Ireland. The club is exclusively concerned with the game of hurling.

== History ==
Located in the village of Rathmolyon, about five miles from Trim, Rathmolyon GAA Club was founded in 1963 when a group of men who were playing with Moynalvey decided to establish a hurling club in the area. A juvenile and underage section of the club was also established. Rathmolyon had its first success when the club won the Meath IHC title in 1975 and secured senior status for the first time.

Success at senior level was slow in coming, with Rathmolyon losing three consecutive Meath SHC finals between 1982 and 1984. A decade later in 1993, Rathmolyon won its first Meath SHC title, after beating Wolfe Tones by 2–14 to 4-07. A second title followed three years later in 1996 after a defeat of Kilmessan in the final.

Rathmolyon claimed a third and final Meath SHC title in 2006. The club subsequently faced a relegation from the top tier, but won a second Meath IHC title in 2012 to reclaim the club's senior status.

== Honours ==
- Meath Senior Hurling Championship (3): 1993, 1996, 2006
- Meath Intermediate Hurling Championship (3): 1975, 2012, 2026

== Notable players ==
- Jack Fagan: All-Ireland SHC runner-up (2020)
