= 2012 Meath Intermediate Football Championship =

Meath I.F.C.
- Season: 2012
- Champions: Na Fianna
- Promoted: Na Fianna
- Relegated: n/a
- Leinster ICFC: Na Fianna (Semi-final); O'Connels 2-10, Na Fianna 2-9.
- All Ireland ICFC: n/a
- Matches: 35

The 2012 Meath Intermediate Football Championship is the 86th edition of the Meath GAA's premier club Gaelic football tournament for intermediate graded teams in County Meath, Ireland. The tournament consists of 15 teams, with the winner going on to represent Meath in the Leinster Intermediate Club Football Championship. The championship starts with a group stage and then progresses to a knock out stage.

The draw for the group stages of the championship were made on 13 February 2012 with the games commencing on the weekend of 15 April 2012.

This was Trim's first year in the grade since 1949. They were relegated after 62 years as a senior club. Skryne are the only club to have operated at the senior grade for longer.

On 21 October 2012, Na Fianna claimed their 1st Intermediate championship title when they defeated Trim 1–12 to 1-10, succeeding Moynalvey as Intermediate champions.

There was no relegation from this grade in 2012.

== Team changes ==
The following teams have changed division since the 2011 championship season.

=== From I.F.C. ===
Promoted to S.F.C.

- Moynalvey - (Intermediate Champions)

Relegated to 2012 J.A.F.C.

- Cortown

=== To I.F.C. ===
Relegted from S.F.C.

- Trim

Promoted from 2011 J.A.F.C.

- Ballivor - (Junior 'A' Champions)

== Participating teams ==
The teams taking part in the 2012 Meath Intermediate Football Championship are:

| Club | Location | 2011 Championship Position | 2012 Championship Position |
|---|---|---|---|
| Ballinabrackey | Ballinabrackey | Non Qualifier | Semi-finalist |
| Ballinlough | Ballinlough | Semi-finalist | Quarter-finalist |
| Ballivor | Ballivor | Promoted From Junior | Non Qualifier |
| Carnaross | Carnaross | Non Qualifier | Non Qualifier |
| Castletown | Castletown | Non Qualifier | Semi-finalist |
| Clann na nGael | Athboy | Quarter-finalist | Non Qualifier |
| Dunderry | Dunderry | Semi-finalist | Non Qualifier |
| Gaeil Colmcille | Kells | Finalists | Non Qualifier |
| Longwood | Longwood | Non Qualifier | Non Qualifier |
| Na Fianna | Enfield | Quarter-finalist | Champions |
| St Colmcilles | Laytown | Non Qualifier | Non Qualifier |
| St Michaels | Carlanstown | Relegation Play Off | Quarter-finalist |
| St Ultans | Bohermeen | Relegation Play Off | Non Qualifier |
| Syddan | Lobinstown | Non Qualifier | Non Qualifier |
| Trim | St Lomans Park, Trim | Relegated From Senior | Finalists |

== Intermediate Championship Proposals ==
- 2012: During the winter of 2011/2012 proposals to change the structure of the Intermediate Football Championship by increasing the number of 15 teams in 2012 to 18 teams in 2014 were passed so that teams will have no byes during the group phase. To achieve this, in the 2012 championship, there will be 15 teams competing for promotion to the Senior championship with no relegation from the Intermediate or Senior championships. The two Junior football championship finalists will be promoted leaving the number of teams for the 2013 championship at 16 teams.
- 2013: In the 2013 Intermediate championship, there will be 16 teams of one groups of 6 teams and two groups of 5 teams. There will once again be no relegation to the Junior championship and one team will be promoted to the Senior championship. One team will be relegated from Senior to Intermediate and the Junior championship finalists will be promoted, leaving 18 Intermediate teams for the start of the 2014 campaign.
- 2014: Three groups of 6 teams with the top 3 from each group qualifying for the knock-out stages.

== Group stage ==
In the group stage there are three groups called Group A, B and C. The top two teams from each group go through to the knock-out stages of the tournament.

=== Group A ===
| Team | Pld | W | L | D | PF | PA | PD | Pts |
|---|---|---|---|---|---|---|---|---|
| Trim | 4 | 3 | 0 | 1 | 51 | 39 | +12 | 7 |
| Ballinlough | 4 | 2 | 1 | 1 | 54 | 44 | +10 | 5 |
| Longwood | 4 | 2 | 1 | 1 | 40 | 40 | +0 | 5 |
| St Colmcilles | 4 | 1 | 3 | 0 | 46 | 61 | -15 | 2 |
| Gaeil Colmcille | 4 | 0 | 3 | 1 | 47 | 54 | -7 | 1 |

- Gaeil Colmcille 0-11, 1-8 Trim, Athboy, 20/4/2012,
- Longwood 1–8, 1-8 Ballinlough, Cortown, 20/4/2012,
- St. Colmcilles 1–6, 0-12 Trim, Seneschalstown, 27/4/2012,
- Gaeil Colmcille 0–8, 0-12 Longwood, Kilskyre, 27/4/2012,
- Ballinlough -vs- Gaeil Colmcille, Carnaross, 12/8/12,
- Longwood 1-8 0-8 St Colmcille's, Dunsany, 12/8/12,
- St Colmcille's 0–8, 2-14 Ballinlough, Rathkenny, 1/8/12,
- Trim 1-10, 0-8 Longwood, Boardsmill, 1/8/2012,
- Ballinlough 1–8, 2-9 Trim, Martry, 9/9/2012,
- Gaeil Colmcille 4–6, 0-21 St. Colmcilles, Rathkenny, 9/9/2012,

=== Group B ===
| Team | Pld | W | L | D | PF | PA | PD | Pts |
|---|---|---|---|---|---|---|---|---|
| Na Fianna | 4 | 4 | 0 | 0 | 87 | 55 | +33 | 8 |
| St Michaels | 4 | 3 | 1 | 0 | 67 | 57 | +10 | 6 |
| Dunderry | 4 | 2 | 2 | 0 | 38 | 38 | +0 | 4 |
| Syddan | 4 | 1 | 3 | 0 | 52 | 56 | -4 | 2 |
| Clann na nGael | 4 | 0 | 4 | 0 | 29 | 67 | -38 | 0 |

- Dunderry 1–9, 0-10 St Michaels, Kilskyre, 15/4/2012,
- Syddan 0-11, 3-7 Na Fianna, Trim, 15/4/2012,
- Dunderry 0-12, 0-9 Syddan, Simonstown, 27/4/2012,
- Clann na nGael 1–9, 1-13 St Michaels, Kilmainham, 27/4/2012,
- Na Fianna 0-17, 1-13 Dunderry, Boardsmill, 11/8/2012,
- Syddan 1-17, 0-7 Clann na nGael, Bective, 11/8/2012,
- Clann na nGael 1–7, 3-22 Na Fianna, Trim, 2/9/2012,
- St. Michaels 1-18, 0-12 Syddan, Drumconrath, 2/9/2012,
- Na Fianna 3-14, 1-15 St. Michaels, Kildalkey, 8/9/2012,
- Dunderry w/o, scr Clann na nGael, Trim, 8/9/2012

=== Group C ===
| Team | Pld | W | L | D | PF | PA | PD | Pts |
|---|---|---|---|---|---|---|---|---|
| Ballinabrackey | 4 | 4 | 0 | 0 | 43 | 17 | +26 | 8 |
| Castletown | 4 | 3 | 1 | 0 | 44 | 45 | -1 | 6 |
| Ballivor | 4 | 1 | 2 | 1 | 31 | 24 | +7 | 3 |
| Carnaross | 4 | 1 | 3 | 0 | 33 | 46 | -13 | 2 |
| St Ultans | 4 | 0 | 3 | 1 | 35 | 54 | -19 | 1 |

- Castletown 0–5, 1-12 Ballinabrackey, Bohermeen, 14/4/2012,
- Carnaross 0–4, 1-9 Ballivor, Simonstown, 20/4/2012,
- Carnaross 0–9, 1-10 Castletown, Moynalty, 27/4/2012,
- St. Ultans 1–6, 0-9 Ballivor, Trim, 27/4/2012,
- Castletown 1-12, 1-8 St. Ultans, Moynalty, 11/8/2012,
- Ballinabrackey 2-8, 0-4 Carnaross, Kildalkey, 12/8/2012,
- Ballivor 1–7, 0-11 Castletown, Martry, 2/9/2012,
- St. Ultans 0–8, 1-11 Ballinabrackey, Trim, 2/9/2012,
- Ballinabrackey w/o, scr Ballivor, Summerhill, 9/9/2012,
- Carnaross 2-10, 0-7 St. Ultans, Kilmainham, 9/9/2012,

=== Finals ===
Quarter-finals
Ballinabrackey | 1-12
St. Michaels | 1-11
Castletown | 1-9
Ballinlough | 0-9

Semi-finals
Trim | 0-11
Ballinabrackey | 0-9
Na Fianna | 1-16
Castletown | 0-15

Final
Trim | 1-10
Na Fianna | 1-12

Quarter-finals

- Ballinabrackey 1-12, 1-11 St. Michaels, Cortown, 29/9/2012,
- Castletown 1-9, 0-9 Ballinlough, Moynalty, 29/9/2012,

Semi-final

- Trim 0-11, 0-9 Ballinabrackey, Dunsany, 7/10/2012,
- Na Fianna 1-16, 0-15 Castletown, Trim, 7/10/2012,

Final

- Trim 1-10, 1-12 Na Fianna, Pairc Tailteann, 21/10/2012,
