= Navan GAA =

Navan GAA may refer to various Gaelic games clubs in Navan, County Meath, Ireland:

- Navan O'Mahonys GAA, currently active club (founded 1948)
- Navan Gaels GAA, defunct (heyday 1920s–1930s)
- Navan Hibernians GAC, defunct hurling club

== See also ==
- Meath GAA, governing body; responsible for county teams
