= Johnny Greville =

Irish hurling manager and former player

Personal information
- Born: 1980 (age 45–46) Raharney, County Westmeath, Ireland
- Occupation: Carer

Sport
- Sport: Hurling
- Position: Centre-back
Club
- Years: Club
- Raharney
Club titles
- Westmeath titles: 3

Johnny Greville
Personal information
- Born: 1980 (age 45–46)

Sport
Club management
- Years: Club
- 2010-2016 2016-2018 2020-2023 2024: Raharney; Kildalkey; Faughs; Maynooth
Inter-county management
- Years: Team
- 2016-2020 2024-: Westmeath senior camogie team Meath senior hurling team
Inter-county titles as manager
County	League	Province	All-Ireland
Westmeath Meath	0; 2	0; 0	0; 0

Johnny Greville (born 1979 or 1980) is an Irish hurling manager and former player who was appointed as manager of the Meath senior hurling team in 2024. He played club hurling for Raharney. He also played at different levels with various Westmeath teams.

== Playing career ==
Greville first played hurling at juvenile and underage levels with Raharney, before progressing to the club's senior team. He captained the team to the Westmeath SHC title in 2006 after a replay defeat of Castletown Geoghegan. Greville won a second SHC title following a 0–15 to 2–06 defeat of Clonkill in 2008.

Greville first played for Meath during a two-year tenure with the minor team. His last game in that grade was an All-Ireland MBHC final defeat by Carlow in 1998. Greville later progressed to the under-21 team. He made a number of appearances for the senior team, his last coming in 2004.

== Management career ==
Greville first became involved in team management and coaching at club level with Raharney. During a lengthy spells in charge he guided the team to Westmeath SHC titles in 2010, 2014 and 2016. Greville had his first involvement in inter-county management when he became a selector with the Westmeath senior hurling team under manager Brian Hanley in 2012. He became Westmeath's minor team manager in November 2013, serving in that role for two seasons. Greville returned to club management when he took charge of the Kildalkey club in 2016.

Greville spent five years as Westmeath's camogie manager. He guided the team to the All-Ireland JCC title in 2017 before claiming the All-Ireland ICC title in 2019. Greville also served as Westmeath's under-20 team manager that year and was also a selector with the senior team under Joe Quaid when they lost the McDonagh Cup final to Laois.

A return to club management saw Greville take charge of Faughs and Maynooth. He was appointed as the manager of the Meath senior hurling team in September 2024.

== Honours ==
=== Player ===
Raharney

- Westmeath Senior Hurling Championship: 2006 (c), 2008

=== Management ===
Raharney

- Westmeath Senior Hurling Championship: 2010, 2014, 2016

Westmeath

- All-Ireland Intermediate Camogie Championship: 2019
- All-Ireland Junior Camogie Championship: 2017

Sporting positions
Preceded by Steven Clynch	Meath senior hurling team manager 2024-	Succeeded by Incumbent
