= Meath Senior Hurling Championship =

- Current season or competition: 2026 Meath Senior Hurling Championship
- Irish: Craobh Iomána Sinsear An Mhí
- Founded: 1902
- Trophy: Jubilee Cup
- Title holders: Kilmessan (30th Title)
- Most titles: Kilmessan (30 titles)
- Sponsors: Ted Murtagh Clothing & Footwear, Trim

The Meath Senior Hurling Championship is an annual Gaelic Athletic Association competition organised by Meath GAA among the top hurling clubs in County Meath, Ireland. The winner qualifies to represent the county in the Leinster Intermediate Club Hurling Championship, the winner of which progresses to the All-Ireland Intermediate Club Hurling Championship.

The first senior hurling championship was held in 1902 and Navan Hibernians finished as the inaugural winning team. In 2008, Kilmessan became the first Meath club to win a Leinster hurling club championship, when they won the Intermediate title.

The 2026 Meath Senior Hurling Championship was won by Kilmessan who beat Kiltale by 0-22 to 0-15 in the final, which was played in St. Lomans Park, Trim due to the ongoing development of Páirc Tailteann. This is Kilmessans 30th county title.

== Format ==
In 2026 a new format was established. The Senior Hurling Championship is reduced to 6 teams while the other 6 teams form the new Senior B Championship.

The 6 teams play against each other team in the group. The 1st placed team qualifies directly for the Final. The 2nd and 3rd placed teams face each other in a semi-final. The 5th and 6th placed team face each other in a relegation play-off unless there is a gap of 3 or more points between these teams in which case the 6th placed team is relegated automatically.

== Teams ==
=== 2026 Senior Hurling Championship ===
Club	Location	Position in 2026	Championship titles	Last title
Kildalkey	Kildalkey	Group stage	7	2023
Kilmessan	Kilmessan	Champions	30	2026
Kiltale	Kiltale	Runners-up	9	2018
Na Fianna	Enfield	Relegated	0	—
Ratoath	Ratoath	Semi-Finals	3	2025
Trim	Trim	Group stage	28	2022

=== 2026 Senior Hurling Championship B ===
Club	Location	Position in 2026	SHC titles	Last SHC title
Blackhall Gaels	Batterstown and Kilcloon	Relegated	0	—
Dunderry	Dunderry	Runners-up	0	—
Killyon	Killyon	Group stage	7	2005
Kilskyre/Moylagh	Kilskeer & Moylagh	Champions	0	—
Longwood	Longwood	Semi-final	1	1936
Navan O'Mahonys	Navan	Group stage	2	1986

== Qualification for subsequent competitions ==
At the end of the championship, the winning team represents Meath in the subsequent Leinster Intermediate Club Hurling Championship.

== Roll of Honour ==
#	Club	Wins	Years won
1	Kilmessan	30	1907, 1922, 1925, 1927, 1933, 1934, 1937, 1939, 1943, 1944, 1945, 1946, 1947, 1948, 1961, 1962, 1965, 1969, 1976, 1977, 1978, 1990, 1997, 1999, 2002, 2003, 2004, 2008, 2013, 2026
2	Trim	28	1915, 1916, 1919, 1920, 1921, 1935, 1940, 1941, 1942, 1949, 1950, 1952, 1955, 1956, 1957, 1959, 1960, 1987, 1988, 1989, 1992, 1994, 1995, 1998, 2000, 2001, 2020, 2022
3	Kiltale	9	1982, 1983, 2007, 2012, 2014, 2015, 2016, 2017, 2018
3	Athboy	9	1924, 1926, 1928, 1929, 1966, 1967, 1968, 1970, 1972
5	Kildalkey	7	1951, 2009, 2010, 2011, 2019, 2021, 2023
5	Killyon	7	1918, 1979, 1980, 1981, 1984, 1991, 2005
7	Boardsmill	6	1958, 1964, 1971, 1973, 1974, 1975
8	St Peter's, Dunboyne	5	1908, 1911, 1912, 1913, 1914
9	Navan Young Irelands	4	1903, 1904, 1905, 1906
10	Ratoath	3	1963, 2024, 2025
10	Dunshaughlin	3	1909, 1910, 1923
10	Erin's Own	3	1930, 1931, 1932
10	Rathmolyon	3	1993, 1996, 2006
14	St Patrick's (Amalgamation)	2	1953, 1954
14	Navan O'Mahony's	2	1985, 1986
16	Longwood	1	1936
16	Navan Hibernians	1	1902

== List of finals ==
=== List of Meath SHC finals ===
Year	Winners	Score	Runners-up	Score
2026	Kilmessan	0-22	Kiltale	0-15
2025	Ratoath	3-19, 2-22 (R)	Kiltale	4-16, 4-10 (R)
2024	Ratoath	2-15	Trim	1-16
2023	Kildalkey	0-19	Ratoath	0-16
2022	Trim	1–13	Ratoath	1–10
2021	Kildalkey	0–18	Kiltale	2-06
2020	Trim	1-26 (AET)	Ratoath	1-25
2019	Kildalkey	1–13, 1-17 (R)	Kiltale	1–13, 0-11 (R)
2018	Kiltale	2–18	Trim	0–14
2017	Kiltale	1–15	Kildalkey	1–14
2016	Kiltale	0–17	Killyon	1–13
2015	Kiltale	2–15	Kildalkey	0–12
2014	Kiltale	1-25	Trim	0–12
2013	Kilmessan	2–16	Longwood	0–11
2012	Kiltale	1–14	Killyon	0–14
2011	Kildalkey	3–11	Navan O'Mahony's	0–10
2010	Kildalkey	1-21	Kilmessan	2–13
2009	Kildalkey	1–19	St Peter's, Dunboyne	2-08
2008	Kilmessan	0–13	Kildalkey	0-08
2007	Kiltale	1-08	Kilmessan	0-09
2006	Rathmolyon	2–14	St Peter's, Dunboyne	2–12
2005	Killyon	2-09	Kildalkey	0-07
2004	Kilmessan	1–12	Trim	2-06
2003	Kilmessan	1–13	St Peter's, Dunboyne	2-08
2002	Kilmessan	1–14	St Peter's, Dunboyne	0–13
2001	Trim	1–13	Dunderry	0-08
2000	Trim	w/o	Kilmessan	scr
1999	Kilmessan	3–10	Killyon	1-08
1998	Trim		Kilmessan	
1997	Kilmessan	1–18	Rathmolyon	1-07
1996	Rathmolyon	0–10	Kilmessan	1-02
1995	Trim	2–10	Kilmessan	0-08
1994	Trim	1-07	Kilmessan	0-07
1993	Rathmolyon	2–14	Wolfe Tones	4-07
1992	Trim	2–11	Kilmessan	0–12
1991	Killyon	2-09	Trim	1–11
1990	Kilmessan	0–11	Kildalkey	0-06
1989	Trim	4-05	Kilmessan	2-05
1988	Trim	2-06	Kildalkey	2-05
1987	Trim	0-08	Athboy	0-06
1986	Navan O'Mahony's	4-08	Athboy	3-07
1985	Navan O'Mahony's	1-08	Killyon	1-06
1984	Killyon	6-03	Rathmolyon	1-09
1983	Kiltale	0–11	Rathmolyon	1-05
1982	Kiltale	3-07	Rathmolyon	2-06
1981	Killyon		Athboy	
1980	Killyon		Kildalkey	
1979	Killyon		Boardsmill	
1978	Kilmessan		Boardsmill	
1977	Kilmessan		Athboy	
1976	Kilmessan		Boardsmill	
1975	Boardsmill		Kilmessan	
1974	Boardsmill			
1973	Boardsmill			
1972	Athboy		Kilmessan	
1971	Boardsmill			
1970	Athboy			
1969	Kilmessan		Ratoath	
1968	Athboy		Ratoath	
1967	Athboy		Ratoath	
1966	Athboy			
1965	Kilmessan		St Peter's, Dunboyne	
1964	Boardsmill		St Peter's, Dunboyne	
1963	Ratoath	9-03	St Peter's, Dunboyne	6–11
1962	Drumree		St Peter's, Dunboyne	
1961	Kilmessan		Longwood	
1960	Trim		Ratoath	
1959	Trim			
1958	Boardsmill		Kiltale	
1957	Trim			
1956	Trim			
1955	Trim			
1954	St Patrick's		Trim	
1953	St Patrick's		Trim	
1952	Trim			
1951	Kildalkey			
1950	Trim			
1949	Trim			
1948	Kilmessan			
1947	Drumree			
1946	Drumree			
1945	Drumree			
1944	Drumree			
1943	Drumree			
1942	Trim		Oberstown	
1941	Trim		Kilmessan	
1940	Trim		Kilmessan	
1939	Kilmessan			
1938	Null and Void			
1937	Kilmessan			
1936	Longwood		Kilmessan	
1935	Trim			
1934	Kilmessan			
1933	Kilmessan			
1932	Erin's Own		Athboy	
1931	Erin's Own			
1930	Erin's Own		Athboy	
1929	Athboy			
1928	Athboy			
1927	Kilmessan			
1926	Athboy			
1925	Kilmessan			
1924	Athboy			
1923	Kilmessan			
1922	Kilmessan			
1921	Trim			
1920	Trim			
1919	Trim			
1918	Killyon			
1917	Null and Void			
1916	Trim		Kilskyre	
1915	Trim		St Peter's, Dunboyne	
1914	St Peter's, Dunboyne			
1913	St Peter's, Dunboyne			
1912	St Peter's, Dunboyne			
1911	St Peter's, Dunboyne			
1910	Kilmessan			
1909	Kilmessan			
1908	St Peter's, Dunboyne			
1907	Kilmessan			
1906	Navan Young Irelands			
1905	Navan Young Irelands			
1904	Navan Young Irelands			
1903	Navan Young Irelands			
1902	Navan Hibernians			

- Note: 2020 final was played on 8 August 2021 as final was delayed due to the impact of the COVID-19 pandemic on Gaelic games.

== See also ==
- Meath Senior Football Championship
- Meath Senior B Hurling Championship (Tier 2)
