= Ballivor =

Village in County Meath, Ireland

Ballivor Baile Íomhair
- Village
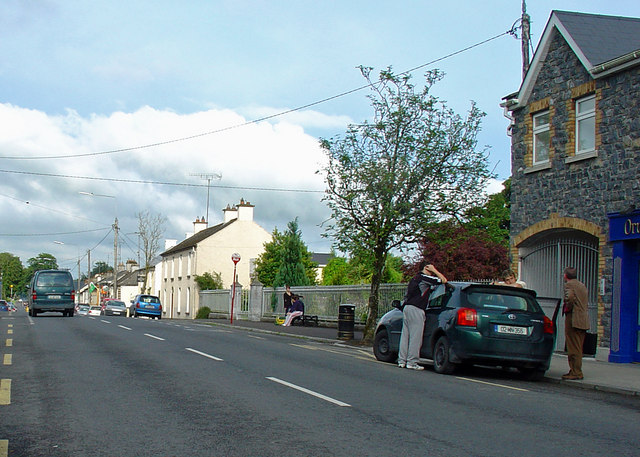
- Main Street

- Location in Ireland
- Coordinates: 53°31′58″N 6°57′53″W
- Country: Ireland
- Province: Leinster
- County: Meath

Area
  - Total: 0.98 km^{2} (0.38 sq mi)
- Elevation: 66 m (217 ft)

Population
  - Total: 1,809
  - Density: 1,800/km^{2} (4,800/sq mi)
- Irish Grid Reference: N686541

Ballivor (/'bælaɪvər/ BAL-eyevər; Irish: Baile Íomhair, meaning 'the town of Íomhar') is a village in County Meath, Ireland. It had a population of 1,809 at the 2016 census. It is on the R156 road between the towns of Mullingar and Trim, and is around 50 km north-west of Dublin.

== Public transport ==
Bus Éireann route 115C provided a commuter link from Ballivor to Dublin via Summerhill and Maynooth with one journey in the morning and an evening journey back every day except Sunday. Until 24 August 2013 (inclusive) Bus Éireann route 118 provided a daily commuter service from to/from Dublin via Dunboyne and a daily service to/from Mullingar. As of 2022 Bus Eireann route 115C provides service to Mullingar and Kilcock with a connection to Dublin and Transport for Ireland route 115D provides service to Trim via Kildalkey. The 190 runs every other hour from Athlone to Drogheda, going through Trim, Navan and Mullingar

== Education ==
There are two primary schools in the Ballivor region. In the town of Ballivor, there is St. Columbanus National School and Scoil Mhuire Coolronan is located five minutes from the village.

There are no secondary schools in Ballivor but close by there is one in Athboy, one in Longwood and two in Trim.

== Events ==
Nazi Germany spy Hermann Görtz parachuted into Ballivor in the summer of 1940.

The Ballivor Horse Show has been held every June since the early 1970s.

In 2003, the bog body, the "Clonycavan Man" was found in Clonycavan, Ballivor, County Meath. It is now shown in the exhibition, Kingship and Sacrifice at the National Museum of Ireland.

== Notable people ==
- Mary Brück, astronomer
- Richard Corrigan, chef
- F. R. Higgins, poet and manager of the Abbey Theatre
- Thomas Poynton, Catholic missionary

== See also ==
- List of towns and villages in the Republic of Ireland
