= Navan Hibernians GAC =

- County: Meath

Senior Club Championships
	All Ireland	Leinster champions	Meath champions
Hurling:	-	-	1

Navan Hibernians was a Gaelic Athletic Association hurling club that was based in Navan, in County Meath, Ireland.

== Honours ==
Navan Hibernians won the inaugural Meath Senior Hurling Championship in 1902.
