= Thomas Allen (Irish Volunteer) =

Thomas Allen was a member of the Irish Volunteers who fought and died in the 1916 rising in the Four Courts in Dublin.

== Background ==
Thomas Allen was born in Longwood Co. Meath in 1883. While Allen was young his mother died and he and his sister moved a few miles away to their grandparents house at Ballasport in the Hill of Down. Having learned his trade locally as a boot maker Allen relocated to Dublin to seek employment with Winstanley's. While in Dublin, he lived at 19 1/2 Monck Place in Philsborough, Dublin.

== Irish Volunteers ==
Allen joined the Irish Volunteers in 1914 and was attached to C Company of the First Battalion of the Dublin Brigade. In July 1914 he was involved in the Howth gun-running where the Irish Volunteers secured arms. His house was frequently used in sending and receiving messages for the Volunteers. He was heavily involved in Volunteer activity as a Drill Instructor, described as "he was always the first into the drill hall and the last to leave it." His group was colloquially referred to as "The Tommy Allen Athletic Club." On Easter Monday when the 1916 Easter Rising began Allen was promoted from Sergeant to Lieutenant and was stationed in the Four Courts where Ned Daly commanded the Volunteers. Lt. Allen lead a party of about 20 men in the Western Records Wing.

Four days into the rising Allen was mortally wounded from gunfire that ricocheted off fellow Volunteer Sean O'Carroll from a group of British soldiers advancing through Smithfield while barricading a window. Fellow Longwood native Eamonn Duggan, who was also serving with the Irish volunteers in the Four Courts attempted to get medical assistance from Richmond Hospital for Allen but the British officer in charge of the exchange refused to allow the message through and by the time medical attention was received it was too late and Allen died in Richmond Hospital He was 29 years old at the time of his death. The loss of Lt. Allen was described by Captain Sean Prendergast, also C Co. of the 1st Battalion: "He was one of our best, always so active, always so reliable as a man and as a Volunteer. His friends and confidents were legion, and he was beloved by all members of the Company - the "C" Coy he loved. Tommy was our first serious casualty. We felt the loss as a personal and national calamity." His last rites were done by Father Augustine, a known sympathizer for the Volunteers and go-between for the eventual Volunteer surrender. Lt. Allen was said by Father Augustine to have died a, "grand catholic death in the Richmond Hospital kissing his crucifix and murmuring ejaculatory prayers"

Initially buried in Glasnevin Cemetery Tom Allen's remains were reburied in Kilglass cemetery in Longwood in 1917. A series of newspaper articles followed his burial, as allegedly the local Longwood priest called Father Rooney and Father Finegan refused to announce Allen's services or attend the funeral. Rooney would deny this, but would be rebutted by another priest for coercing Thomas Allen's son (also Thomas Allen) and for instead visiting one of his friends. The priest telling of Father Rooney's whereabouts would begin the fund for Thomas Allen's memorial, which still stands at Kilglass. Thomas Allen was survived by his Margaret Anderson, his three sons, James, John, and Thomas, and a daughter, Eileen.
