= Longwood GAA =

Longwood
- Maigh Dearmhaí
- Founded: 1904
- County: Meath
- Nickname: The Wood
- Colours: Black and white
- Grounds: Longwood

Playing kits
Standard colours

Senior Club Championships
	All Ireland	Leinster champions	Meath champions
Hurling:	0	0	1

Longwood GAA is a Gaelic Athletic Association club in Longwood, County Meath, Ireland. The club fields teams in both hurling and Gaelic football.

== History ==
Located in the village of Longwood, County Meath border, Longwood GAA Club was founded in 1904. The club has had successes in both hurling and Gaelic football at various times and in various grades throughout its history. Longwood enjoyed a golden age in the 20-year period between 1928 and 1948, winning three Meath JHC titles, Meath JFC and IFC titles, as well as the club's sole Meath SHC title in 1936.

Longwood's successes continued with five Meath IHC titles being won between 1964 and 2009. That year the club also claimed their first Meath JFC title in 70 years, before winning the Leinster Club JFC title after a one-point replay defeat of St Mochta's. Longwood's second ever Meath IFC title, won in 2018, resulted in the club fielding senior teams in both codes for the first time. They became the inaugural winners of the Meath SBHC title in 2024.

== Honours ==
- Meath Senior Hurling Championship (1): 1936
- Meath Senior B Hurling Championship (1): 2024
- Meath Intermediate Football Championship (2): 1942, 2018
- Meath Intermediate Hurling Championship (5): 1964, 1968, 1982, 1995, 2009
- Leinster Junior Club Football Championship (1): 2009
- Meath Junior Football Championship (2): 1939, 2009
- Meath Junior Hurling Championship (5): 1928, 1933, 1948, 1951, 1959
