= Fore (County Meath barony) =

Barony in County Meath, Ireland

Fore Baile Fhobhair (Irish) Demifore
- Barony
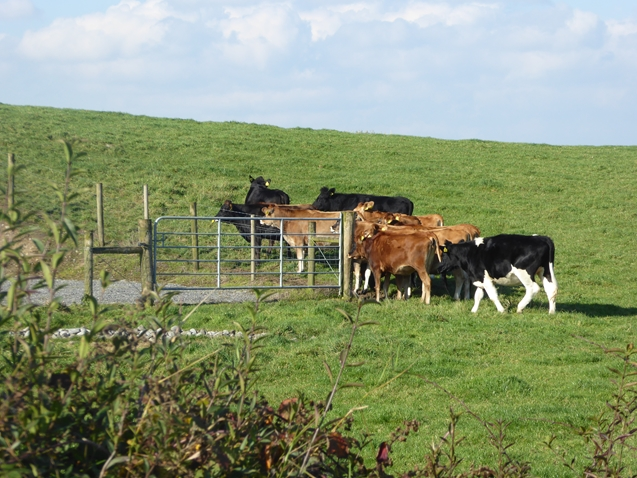
- Cattle at Milltown

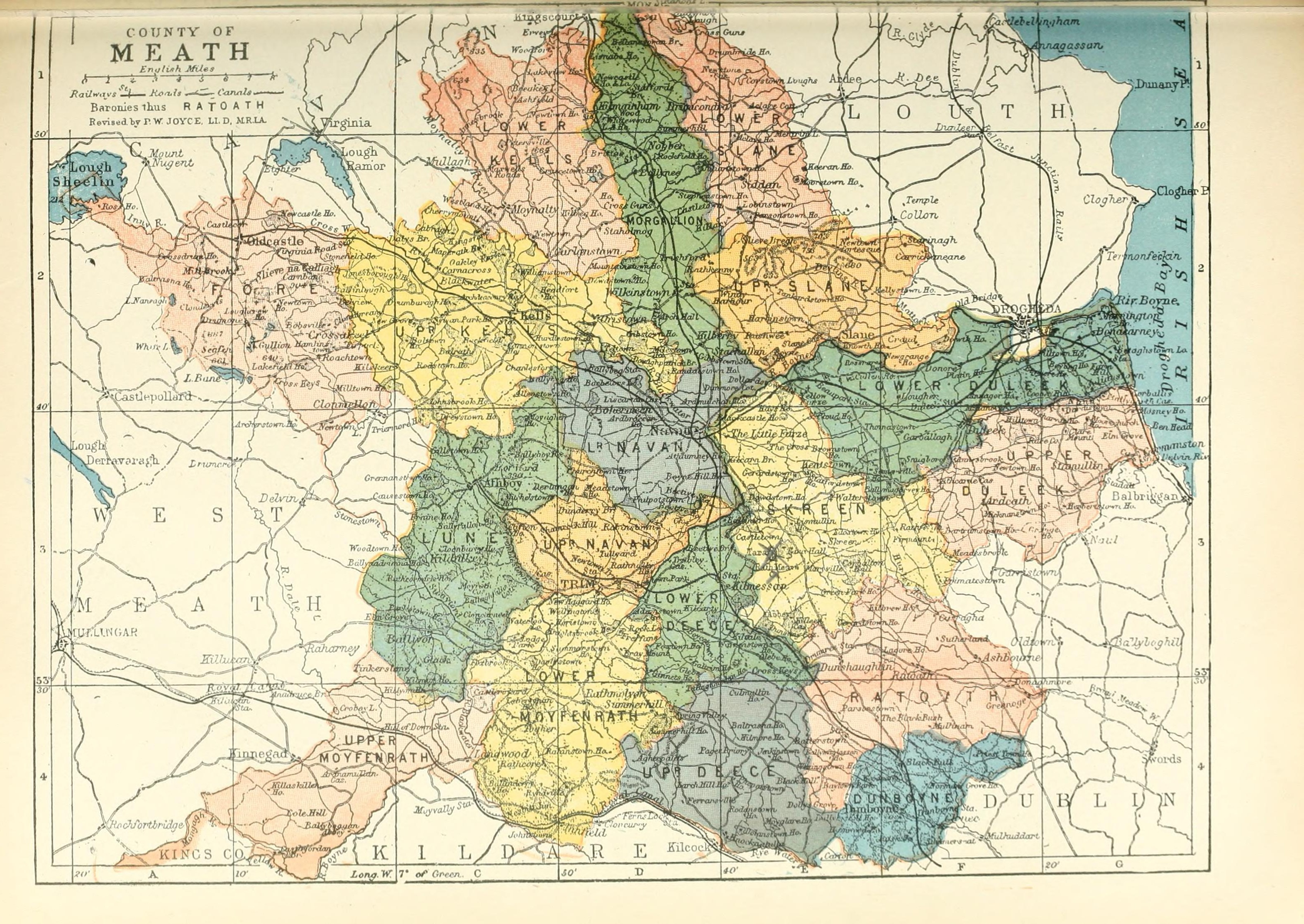
- Barony map of County Meath, 1900; Fore is in the northwest, coloured pink.

- Location within Ireland
- Coordinates: 53°44′N 7°09′W
- Sovereign state: Ireland
- Province: Leinster
- County: Meath

Area
  - Total: 171.5 km^{2} (66.2 sq mi)

Fore (Irish: Baile Fhobhair), also called Demifore, is a historical barony in north-central County Meath, Ireland.

Baronies were mainly cadastral rather than administrative units. They acquired modest local taxation and spending functions in the 19th century before being superseded by the Local Government (Ireland) Act 1898.

== History ==
The region was ruled by the Delbna Bec in the 8th century (with surname Ua Maoilchallan, Mulholland) and the Ó hAonghusa (Hennessys) in the 12th century.

The barony takes its name from Fore Abbey (County Westmeath), whose name is from Irish fobhar, "well." Originally there was a single large barony, but when Meath was split into Meath and Westmeath in the Counties of Meath and Westmeath Act 1543, two "half-baronies" of Fore (Westmeath) and Fore (Meath) were created.

== Geography ==
Fore is a hilly region in the northwest of the county, on the border with County Westmeath to its west; Lough Bane is on the border here. The northern border of Fore follows the River Inny and Lough Sheelin, where it meets County Cavan. Fore barony contains Slieve Na Calliagh and the Loughcrew megalithic complex.

== List of settlements ==
Settlements within the historical barony of Fore include:

- Drumone
- Oldcastle
