= Kildalkey GAA =

GAA club in Meath, Ireland

Kildalkey
- Cill Dealga
- Founded: 1910
- County: Meath
- Colours: Blue and white
- Grounds: Fr. Plunkett Park

Playing kits
Standard colours

Senior Club Championships
	All Ireland	Leinster champions	Meath champions
Hurling:	0	0	7

Kildalkey GAA is a Gaelic Athletic Association club located in Kildalkey, County Meath, Ireland. The club is primarily concerned with the game of hurling. The club has two pitches.

== History ==
Gaelic football/Caid had been played in the Kildalkey area in the early years of the 20th century; but it was not until 1910 that Kildalkey Hurling Club was founded. After later affiliating to the Meath County Board, in 1921, the club had its first success when the Meath MHC title was won in 1927. This was followed by the Meath JHC title in 1930.

Such was the interest in hurling in the area, the club split into two separate clubs in 1935. Both clubs eventually merged in 1939 as Kildalkey Hurling Club once again. Kildalkey went on to win further Meath JHC titles in 1943, 1946, and 1950. The club's first season in the top tier ended with success, with Kildalkey claiming the Meath SHC title, albeit in controversial circumstances.

It was 2009 before Kildalkey won its second Meath SHC overall and its first on the field of play. It was the first of three successive titles. Kildalkey won further titles in 2019 and 2021 after defeats of Kiltale.

Kildalkey first fielded a camogie team in 2012. They won the Meath Junior Camogie championship the same year.

In 2023, Kildalkey won all three hurling championships in Meath. Firstly winning the Junior Championship with a win against St Pats. It took a replay against Navan O'Mahonys to secure the Intermediate Championship. Finally, the Senior Championship was won against Ratoath. Kildalkey also won the Hurling League Division 3 Championship after defeating Donaghmore Ashbourne in the final. Kildalkey also won the Senior Cup competition, the Brendan Davis Cup and the Intermediate Cup competition, the Billy Byrne Cup. In December 2023, the club received a "Club of the Year" award from Meath GAA. Kildalkey also made it to the Leinster Intermediate club hurling championship semi-final in 2023, but were knocked out by Thomastown. The Kildalkey Minor hurling team won the Meath Minor Hurling Championship Div 1 for the first time in 76 years and also won the Div 5 hurling league.

== Grounds ==
Fr. Plunkett Park became Kildalkey's ground in 1960; before that, they used a field beside the crossroad at Cloneylogan. The park has 2 pitches and one astro pitch.

== Honours ==
=== Hurling ===
- Meath Senior Hurling Championship (7): 1951, 2009, 2010, 2011, 2019, 2021 & 2023.
- Meath Intermediate Hurling Championship (2): 1971 & 2023.
- Meath Intermediate B Hurling Championship (1): 2025.
- Meath Junior Hurling Championship (7): 1930, 1943, 1946, 1950, 1969, 2009, 2023.
- Meath Junior 2 Hurling Championship (4): 1994, 2008, 2017, 2022.
- Meath Minor Hurling Championship (3): 1927, 1948, 2024.
- Meath Minor Hurling Championship Shield Div 1 (4): 2010, 2018, 2021, 2023.
- Meath Minor Hurling Championship Cup Div 2 (2): 1984 2011.
- Meath Minor Hurling Championship Shield Div 2 (3): 2009, 2022, 2026.
- Meath Minor Hurling Championship Cup Div 3 (1): 2008.
- Meath Minor Hurling League Cup Div 1 (1): 2016.
- Meath Minor Hurling League Shield Div 1 (2): 2017, 2019.
- Meath Minor Hurling League Cup Div 2 (2): 2022, 2023.
- Meath Minor Hurling League Shield Div 2 (2) 2016, 2025.
- Meath Minor Hurling Tournament Group A Shield (1) 2024.
- Meath Minor Hurling Tournament Group B Shield (1) 2025.
- Meath Minor Hurling Tournament 7 Aside Shield (1) 2026.
- Meath Division 1 Hurling League (6): 1969, 2011, 2012, 2018, 2019, 2025.
- Meath Division 1 B Hurling League (1): 2014.
- Meath Division 2 Hurling League (3): 1987, 2014, 2024.
- Meath Division 3 Hurling League (3): 2023, 2019, 2018.
- Meath Division 5 A Football League (1): 2007.
- Meath Div 5 A Hurling League (1): 2024
- Meath U21 Hurling Championship Div 1 Cup (1): 2017.
- Meath U21 Hurling Championship Div 2 Cup (1): 2011.
- Meath U17 Hurling League Div 1
- Meath U16 Hurling Championship Div 1 Cup (1): 2006.
- Meath U16 Hurling Championship Div 1 Shield (1): 2017.
- Meath U16 Hurling Championship Div 2 Cup (3): 1996, 1998,2026.
- Meath U16 Hurling League Div 1 Shield (1): 2017.
- Meath U15 Hurling League Div 2 Shield (3): 2008, 2010, 2011.
- Meath U14 Hurling Championship Div 1 Cup (1): 2006.
- Meath U14 Hurling Championship Div 2 Cup (1): 2008.
- Meath U14 Football Championship Div 3 Cup (1): 2007.
- Meath U14 Hurling League Div 1 Shield (1): 2016.
- Meath U13 Hurling Championship Div 1 Cup (1): 2020.
- Meath U13 Hurling Championship Div 2 Cup (2): 2012, 2018.
- Meath U12 Hurling Championship Div 1 Cup (2): 2015, 2018.
- Meath U12 Football Championship Div 3 Cup (1): 2012,
- Meath U11 Hurling Championship Div 2 Cup (1): 2009.
- Brendan Davis Cup (5): 2016, 2017, 2019, 2023, 2026.
- Billy Byrne Cup (4): 2001 2021, 2022, 2023.
- Corn Donal O Loingsigh (1): 2025.
- Billy Harmon Memorial Cup Div 1 (3): 2018, 2025, 2026.

=== Camogie ===
- Meath Intermediate Camogie Championship (2): 2014, 2022.
- Meath Junior Camogie Championship (1): 2012.
- Meath Div 3 Camogie League (1): 2024.
