= Killyon GAA =

Irish hurling club

Killyon
- Cill Liadháin
- County: Meath
- Colours: Red and Green

Playing kits
Standard colours

Senior Club Championships
	All Ireland	Leinster champions	Meath champions
Hurling:	0	0	7

Killyon GAA is a Gaelic Athletic Association club based in Killyon, Hill of Down, County Meath, County Meath. The club is exclusively concerned with the game of hurling.

== Honours ==
- Meath Senior Hurling Championship (7): 1918, 1979, 1980, 1981, 1984, 1991, 2005
