= Kiltale =

Village in County Meath, Ireland

Kiltale Cill Táile
- Village
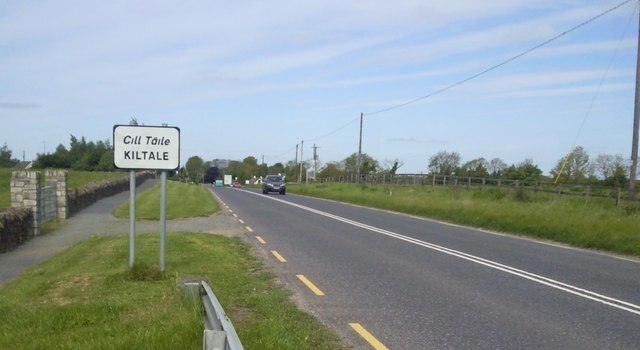
- Signage on approach to Kiltale

- Location in Ireland
- Coordinates: 53°31′30″N 6°40′12″W
- Country: Ireland
- Province: Leinster
- County: County Meath
- Time zone: UTC+0 (WET)
  - Summer (DST): UTC-1 (IST (WEST))

Kiltale (Irish: Cill Táile) is a small rural community district in County Meath, Ireland with a population of about 300. Kiltale is situated on the R154 regional road, the main Dublin to Trim road. It is approximately 9 km east of Trim, about 9 km west of Dunshaughlin and 14 km south of Navan. Kiltale is just over 7 km from the historical seat of the High King of Ireland at the Hill of Tara. The community is in a townland and civil parish of the same name.

Kiltale is home of the European Union Food and Veterinary Offices and Grange, Teagasc's Beef Research Centre.

== Sport ==
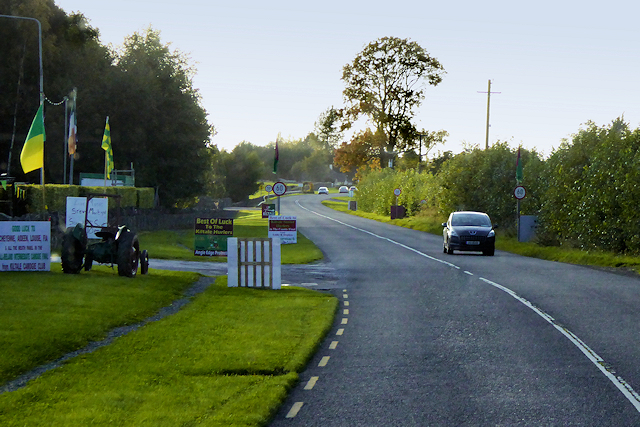
Flags and signs outside of Kiltale GAA grounds

Kiltale GAA, the local hurling and camogie club, is by far the largest sporting organisation in Kiltale and is one of the county's dominant hurling clubs. The team's ground is located on the main Trim-Dublin road, the R154.

The senior hurling team won their first Meath Senior Hurling Championship in 2007, when they defeated local rivals Kilmessan on a scoreline of 1-08 to 0-9. The club went on to win a five-in-a-row series of Meath senior titles, the most recent in 2018.

== Amenities ==
Kiltale has a Roman Catholic Church called the Church of the Assumption of The Blessed Virgin Mary and a national (primary) school (Scoil Mhuire). There is also a small parish hall which hosts community meetings and events. Kiltale is part of the Roman Catholic Parish of Moynalvey in the Diocese of Meath. There is a public bar in the local hurling team's clubhouse, which sometimes hosts live music.

== Transport ==
Public transport to/from Kiltale consists of the Bus Éireann 111/112 service Which serves Cavan-Granard-Athboy-Trim-Kiltale-Batterstown-Blanchardstown-Dublin with approx. 10 services each way per day. And the 134 service which serves Dorey's Forge-Batterjohn-Dunsany-Kilmessan-Kilcarn-Navan Shopping Centre and runs once each way every Thursday.

== Notable people ==
Kiltale is also the hometown of:

- Liam Harnan, Gaelic footballer
- Desmond McGann, long-distance runner
- Hugh O'Sullivan, rugby union player
- Robbie Power, jockey
- Sara Louise Treacy, Olympian

== See also ==
- List of towns and villages in Ireland
