= St Loman's Park =

Gaelic sports stadium

- Páirc Naomh Lómáin
- Interactive map of St Loman's Park
- Location: Trim, County Meath, Ireland
- Coordinates: 53°33′3″N 6°48′1″W
- Owner: Trim GAA
- Public transit: Boyne Bridge bypass bus stop (Bus Éireann route 111)

St Loman's Park (Irish: Páirc Naomh Lómáin), in Trim, Ireland, is a stadium which is home to Trim GAA and is traditionally known as the home of Meath Hurling. The grounds are at the western end of the town, situated on the Newhaggard Road. St Loman's hosted the Meath Senior Hurling Championship final up until 2007, when the main pitch and clubhouse were closed for redevelopment. It also plays host to inter-county hurling games, with Leinster Senior Hurling Championship, Christy Ring Cup, All-Ireland Senior B Hurling Championship, National Hurling League, Walsh Cup and Kehoe Cup games having been held there. Meath inter-county football games and County Senior Finals have been played in Trim, though less often.
