= Drumone =

Village in County Meath, Ireland

Coordinates: 53°43′N 7°09′W

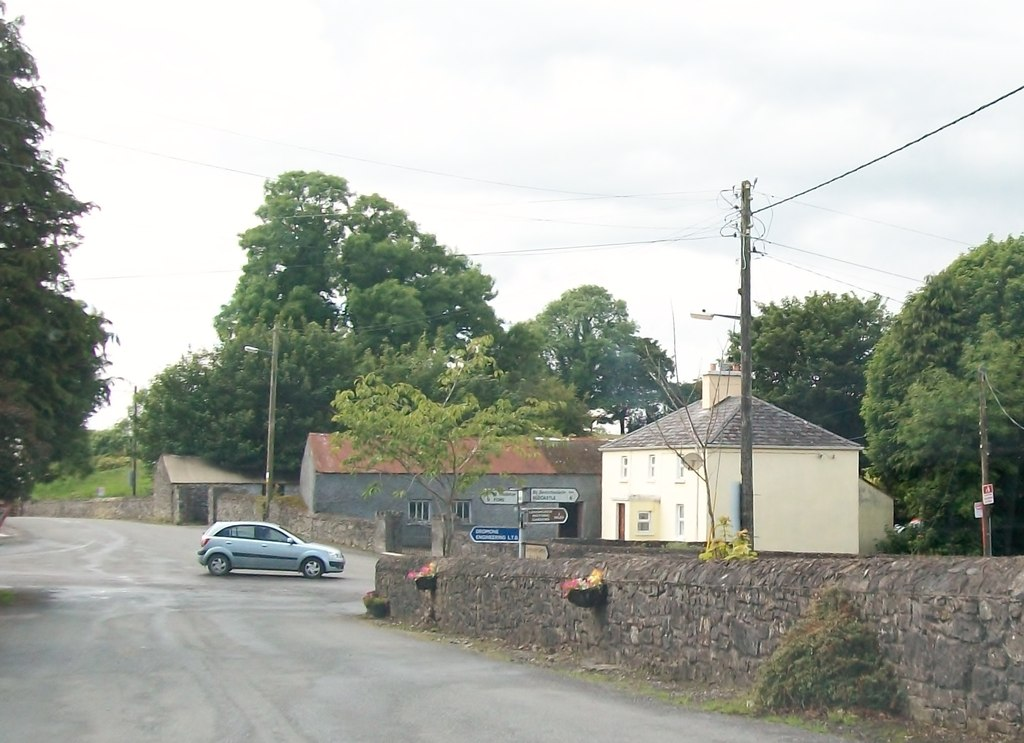
Drumone crossroads

Drumone (Irish: Droim Eamhna) is a small village and townland in western County Meath, Ireland. Drumone townland is within the civil parish of Moylagh, County Meath.

The local Catholic church is dedicated to St. Mary and was built in 1834. A nearby disused Gaelic handball court dates to c. 1920. The local Gaelic Athletic Association (GAA) club is Moylagh GAA.
