= Moylagh, County Meath =

Civil parish in County Meath, Ireland

Coordinates: 53°43′31″N 7°11′23″W

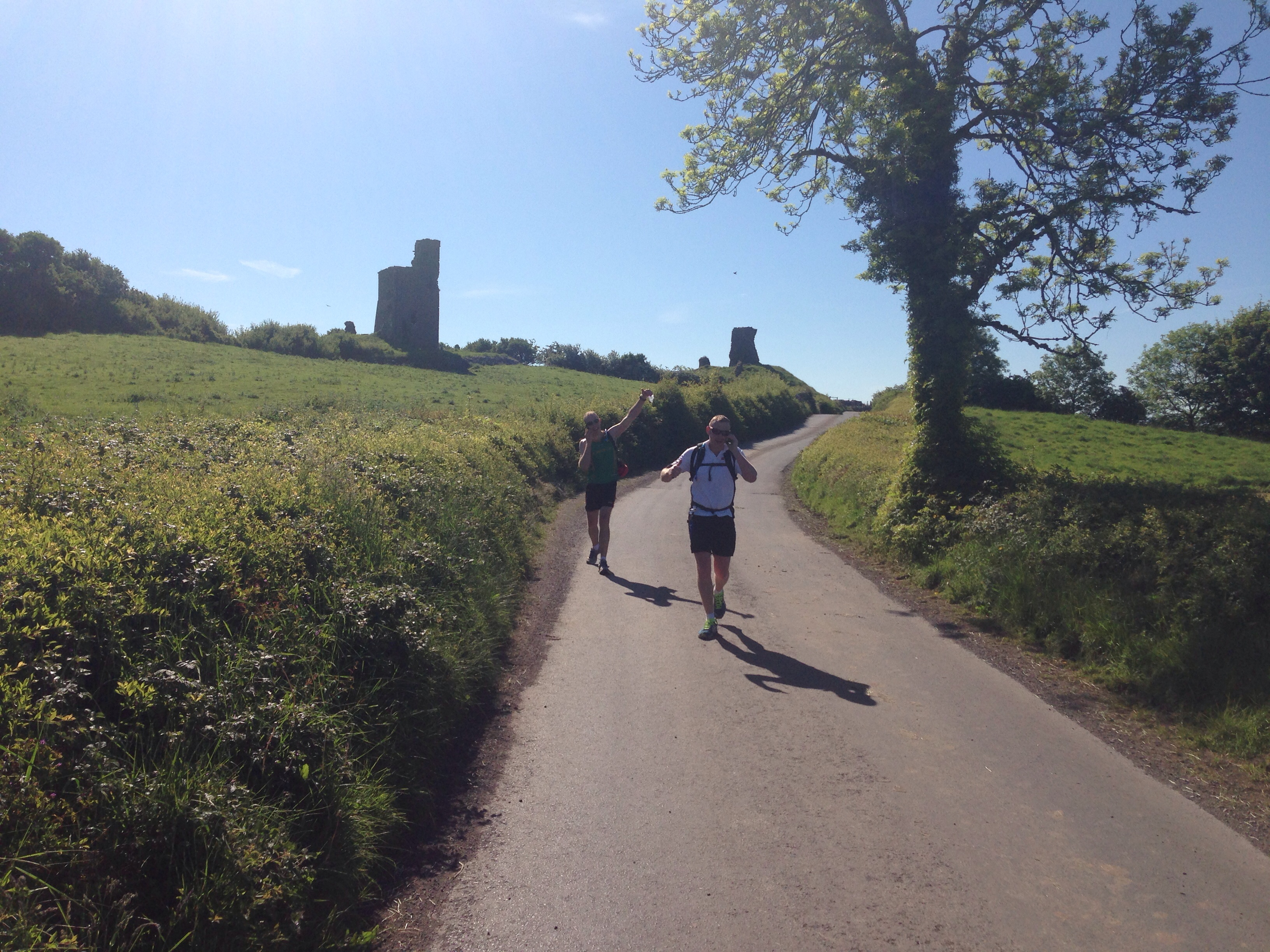
Moylagh Castle in June 2013

Moylagh (Irish: Maigh Locha, meaning 'plain of the lake') is a civil parish and townland in the northwest of County Meath, Ireland. The village of Drumone lies within the civil parish.

== Geography ==
Moylagh townland lies within the Catholic parish of Oldcastle and Moylagh. Both the civil parish and townland of Moylagh are in the historical barony of Fore.

The village of Drumone is within the civil parish of Moylagh. The civil parish also contains 16 townlands, including Gortloney. Gortloney townland, which has an area of approximately 2.2 square kilometres (0.85 sq mi), had a population of 86 in 2011.

== History ==
Evidence of ancient settlement in the Moylagh area includes a number of ringfort and tower house (castle) sites. The remains of Moylagh Castle, a tower house in the townland of Milltown, stand on top of an artificial earthen mound or motte. Moylagh's Catholic church, Saint Mary's Church in Garrynabolie townland, was built in 1834.

Archaeological sites are also located in the surrounding townlands, and Gortloney, for example, contains a number of ringforts and a possible castle site. Gortloney's former national (primary) school was built c. 1860.
