= Na Fianna CLG (Meath) =

Gaelic games club in County Meath, Ireland

- CLG Na Fianna
- Founded: 2000
- County: Meath
- Colours: Yellow and blue
- Grounds: Enfield

Playing kits
Standard colours

Senior Club Championships
	All Ireland	Leinster champions	Meath champions
Football:	-	-	-

Na Fianna CLG (Irish: Cumann Lúthchleas Gael Na Fianna) is a Gaelic Athletic Association club based in Enfield, County Meath, Ireland. The club plays hurling and football in Meath GAA competitions. As of 2025, Na Fianna CLG was playing in the Meath Senior Football Championship, having been promoted after winning the Intermediate Championship in 2012. Na Fianna were SFC finalists in 2013 (in their first year in the senior ranks) and 2015.

== Honours ==
- Meath Intermediate Football Championship (1): 2012
- Meath Intermediate Hurling Championship (1): 2006
- Meath Ladies Intermediate Football Championship (1): 2009
- Leinster Junior Club Hurling Championship (0): (runners-up in 2018)

Preceded by Moynalvey	Meath Intermediate Football Champions; 2012	Succeeded by Gaeil Colmcille
