= Kilmessan GAA =

Hurling club in County Meath, Ireland

Kilmessan
- Cill Mheasáin
- Founded: 1902
- County: Meath
- Colours
- Grounds: Tony Donnelly–Joey Loughran Memorial Park
- Coordinates: 53°33′57″N 6°38′46″W

Playing kits
Standard colours

Senior Club Championships
	All Ireland	Leinster champions	Meath champions
Football:	0	0	3
Hurling:	0	0	30
Camogie:	0	0	22

Kilmessan Hurling Club is a Gaelic Athletic Association club in Kilmessan, County Meath, Ireland. The club is affiliated to the Meath County Board and is primarily concerned with the games of hurling and camogie.

== History ==
Located in the village of Kilmessan, about 14 km south of Navan, Kilmessan GAA Club was founded in 1902. Success was immediate, with the club winning the Meath SFC after a 1-03 to 0-05 win over Castletown. Kilmessan had further Meath SFC title wins in 1936 and 1939.

Kilmessan won its first Meath SHC title in 1907. After winning a second such title in 1922, they went on to dominate the local club hurling scene for the rest of the century, as well as building up a keen rivalry with Trim. By 2002, they had won 25 Meath SHC titles, as well as setting the all-time record by winning six consecutive Meath SHC titles between 1943 and 1948. Kilmessan won the Leinster Club IHC title in 2008, after a 1-07 to 1-06 win over Erin's Own in the final. The club won it's 30th Meath SHC title in 2026, after a 0–22 to 0–15 win over Kiltale in the final.

Kilmessan also has an associated camogie club. After winning three Meath SCC titles between 1964 and 1969, the club went through a long period without success. The 21st century saw Kilmessan Camogie Club win 18 Meath SCC titles between 2001 and 2021, as well as a record ten successive titles during this period.

== Grounds ==
Kilmessan's home ground is Tony Donnelly–Joey Loughran Memorial Park. It is named in honour of two men who played hurling for the club. The official opening took place in 1969 and was marked by a Gaelic football challenge game between Meath and Galway.

== Honours ==
- Leinster Intermediate Club Hurling Championship (1): 2008
- Meath Senior Hurling Championship (30): 1907, 1922, 1925, 1927, 1933, 1934, 1937, 1939, 1943, 1944, 1945, 1946, 1947, 1948, 1961, 1962, 1965, 1969, 1976, 1977, 1978, 1990, 1997, 1999, 2002, 2003, 2004, 2008, 2013, 2026
- Meath Senior Football Championship (3): 1903, 1936, 1939
- Meath Senior Camogie Championship (22): 1964, 1968, 1969, 2001, 2002, 2003, 2005, 2006, 2007, 2009, 2010, 2011, 2012, 2013, 2014, 2015, 2016, 2017, 2018, 2020, 2021
- Meath Intermediate Hurling Championship (1): 1960
- Meath Junior A Hurling Championship (9): 1926, 1932, 1972, 1977, 1983, 1990, 2008, 2016, 2021

== Notable players ==
- Steven Clynch: Christy Ring Cup-winner (2016)
- Nicky Horan: Nicky Rackard Cup-winner (2009)
