= Rathmolyon =

Village in County Meath, Ireland

Rathmolyon Ráth Moliain
- Village
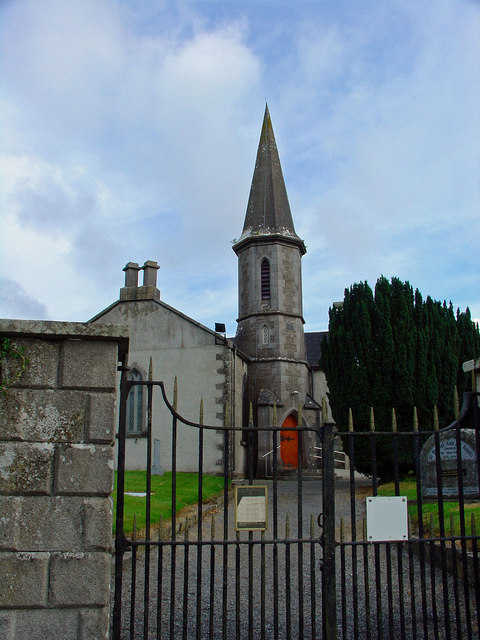
- St. Michael's and All Angels Church, Rathmolyon

- Location in Ireland
- Coordinates: 53°29′20.4″N 6°44′40.2″W
- Country: Ireland
- Province: Leinster
- County: County Meath
- Elevation: 76 m (249 ft)

Population (2016)
  - Total: 334
- Time zone: UTC+0 (WET)
  - Summer (DST): UTC-1 (IST (WEST))
- Irish Grid Reference: N833483

Rathmolyon (/ræθmɒˈlaɪn/; Irish: Ráth Moliain, meaning 'ringfort of the plain of St. Liadhain') is a village in the southern portion of County Meath, Ireland, situated 8 km south of Trim. It is situated at the junction of the R156 regional road and the R159 regional road connecting Trim to Enfield. Rathmolyon serves as a service centre for the surrounding rural area. The village is in a townland and civil parish of the same name.

== Public transport ==
Bus Éireann route 115C serves the village with one journey in the morning and an evening journey to and from Dublin city centre and three off peak services between Mullingar and Kilcock.

== Local history ==
The village developed at the junction of two regional roads. A number of buildings in the village date from the Georgian and Victorian periods. During the late 19th century, the area played a role in the development of the Two by Twos and Cooneyite movement, the only religion known to have had its origin in Ireland.

Notable or historic buildings in Rathmolyon include a Catholic church, a Protestant church, two public houses, Cherryvalley House, Rathmolyon Villa and Rathmolyon House.

== Development ==
The population of Rathmolyon almost doubled in the ten years between the 2006 census (168 inhabitants) and the 2016 census (334 people). According to the 2016 census, almost 50% of the town's houses (53 of 108 households) were constructed between 2001 and 2010.

The townland of Rathmolyon Esker, east of Rathmolyon, has been proposed as a Natural Heritage Area.

== See also ==
- List of towns and villages in Ireland
