= Clann na nGael GAA (Meath) =

Gaelic games club in County Meath, Ireland

Clann na nGael
- Founded: 2002
- County: Meath
- Colours: Green, White and Yellow
- Grounds: Rath Cairn Pitch And Athboy's 2 Pitches And 1 Training Pitch
- Coordinates: 53°37′36.81″N 6°54′37.72″W

Playing kits
Standard colours

Senior Club Championships
| | All Ireland | Leinster champions | Meath champions |
|---|---|---|---|
| Hurling: | - | - | 8 |

Clann na nGael is a Gaelic Athletic Association club based in the Rathcairn and Athboy area of County Meath in Ireland. The club was founded in 2002, combining the two former GAA teams of O'Growney Club Athboy (a hurling and football club), and An Ghaeltacht Rath Cairn (football-only club). The club fields both Gaelic football and hurling teams. It competes in Meath GAA competitions. The club takes part in the annual Comórtas Peile na Gaeltachta also.

== Honours ==
As O'Growney Club Athboy:

- Meath Senior Hurling Championship (8): 1924, 1926, 1928, 1929, 1966, 1967, 1968, 1972
- Meath Junior Football Championship (3): 2007,2019, 2025
- Leinster Junior Club Football Championship (1): 2007 (runners-up in 2019)
- Comórtas Peile na Gaeltachta champions (1): 2025
