= Kildalkey =

Kildalkey Irish: Cill Dealga
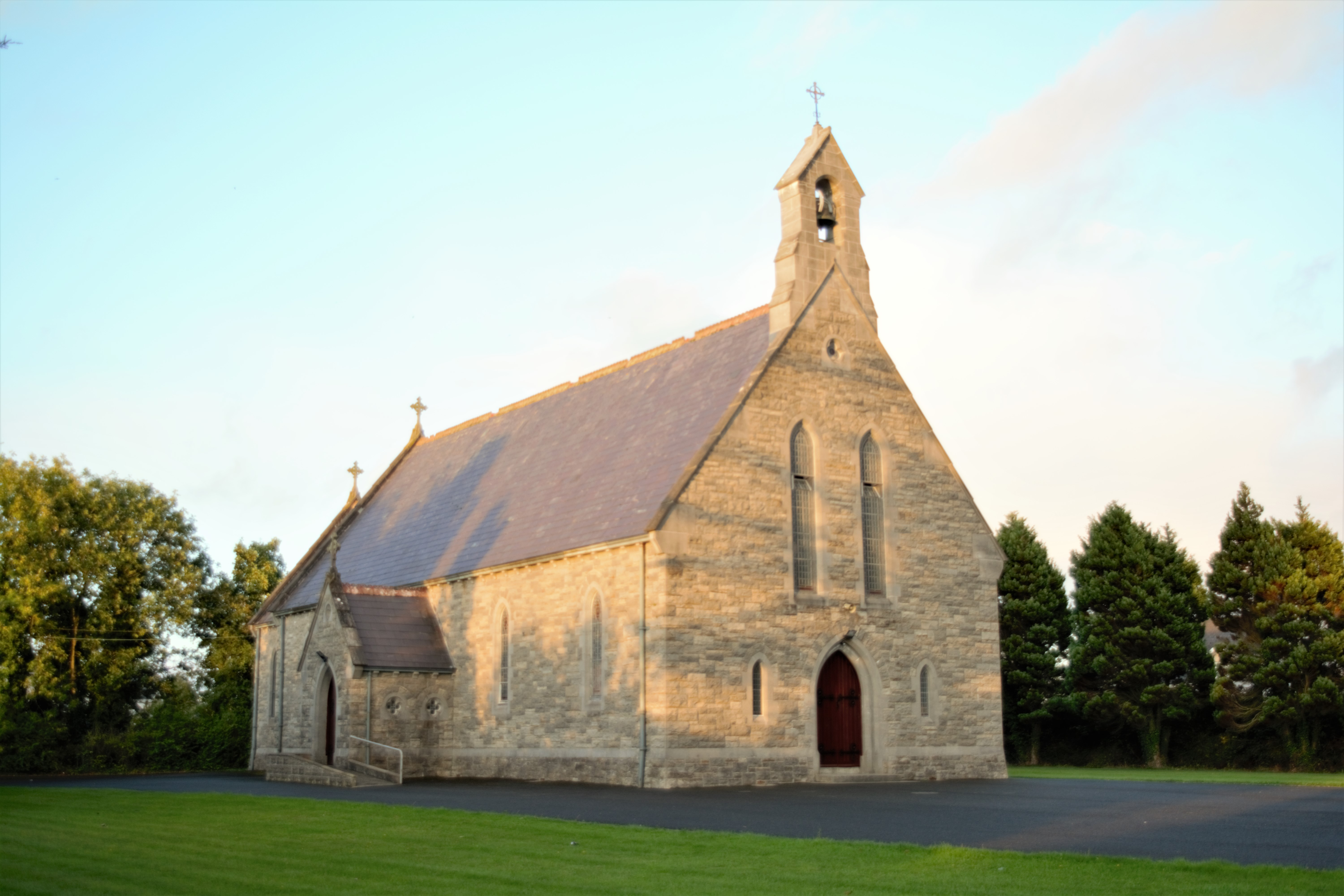
- St Dympna's Church, Kildalkey

- Location in Ireland
- Coordinates: 53°34′13″N 6°54′11″W
- Country: Ireland
- Province: Leinster
- County: County Meath

Population (2022)
  - Total: 739
- Time zone: UTC+0 (WET)
  - Summer (DST): UTC-1 (IST (WEST))
- Irish Grid Reference: N724586

Kildalkey or Kildalky (Irish: Cill Dealga, meaning 'Dealga's church') is a village in County Meath, Ireland. It is in the townland and civil parish of Kildalkey, in the Barony of Lune. The village is in the Catholic parish of Ballivor Kildalkey in the Diocese of Meath. The river Turry runs close to the village.

== Population ==
The population of the village was 149 at the time of the 1996 census. By the time of the 2002 census, the village had grown significantly, more than tripling in population to 518 inhabitants. The population recorded in the 2011 census shows Kildalkey then had a population of 663, a 28% increase from 2006. The census of 2016 showed a further rise in the population to 708.

== History ==
The patron saint is Saint Dymphna, to whom the Catholic church is dedicated. Designed by the architect W H Byrne, it was consecrated in 1898. The Protestant church, by the architect Joseph Welland (1798-1860), was consecrated in 1856 and was situated at Rathcormick, 2 miles west of the village. It was demolished in the 1960s. Christianity came to Kildalkey in the 5th century when St Mo-Luog founded a monastery there and the parish is mentioned in the Book of Kells. A section of the Pale runs through the parish.

A castle (or tower-house) dating from c.1430, which was built by the Nugent family, is at Moyrath. There are twenty-one townlands, all of which are listed with their residents in Griffith's Valuation of 1854. These are: Balaghtalion, Ballynadrimna, Baskinagh Lower, Baskinagh Upper, Cloncarneel, Clonmore, Clonylogan, Corballis, Kildalkey Town, Lady Island, Moat Town, Moyrath, Neillstown, Portanab, Pubblestown, Rathcormick, Rathkeena, Shanco, Woodtown Abbot and Woodtown West. The following families are historically associated with the parish: Barnewall, Nangle, Nugent, and Potterton. The principal landlords in the parish were the Earls of Darnley although William Conolly (commonly known as Speaker Conolly) and later Henry Grattan held Moyrath. The local GAA club is Kildalkey GAA.

== Education ==
A school in Kildalkey was built in 1931 as a two roomed school and replaced a chapel on the site. Later, extensions were added in the 1960s and 1970s to cater for increasing numbers and an amalgamation with Carnisle school.

Due to expanding numbers, a number of prefabricated buildings were added from 2000 on and two classes were located in Kildalkey Hall which was renovated with a grant from the Department of Education in 2006.

It was inevitable however that a more sustainable solution to providing a larger school in Kildalkey was required. In 2009/2010, the new Principal Mr. Fox and the Fr. Devine made a number of approaches to local public representative Noel Dempsey regarding building a new school in Kildalkey. In 2011, the new school project was finally approved and the first stage of the process begun.

The Department of Education Architect did a survey of the school building to investigate whether a new school building could be built on the same site. They found that the most economical approach would be to build a new school on a green field site. Bishop Smith was approached regarding a site and was willing to provide a site on parish land on the Athboy road.

From 2011 to 2016 the design of the building, the planning permission and the appointment of six consultants and building contractors took place with the build getting started in 2017.

The new school building was opened in September 2018. The new school is a state of the art design 12 classroom 2 storey school with a P.E. hall and ancillary rooms. There is a junior yard play area and two basketball courts as well as a football pitch. There are car parks for staff and parents and a traffic flow and drop off system for buses and cars. Pedestrian crossings and a new footpath cater for those who choose to walk a covered bike storage is provided for pupils who cycle to school.

The new school building is designed to make maximum use of natural sunlight with large windows throughout. Many features of the new school are greener such as the rainwater harvesting system which collects and cleans water from the roof for use in toilets. The lighting system uses more efficient lighting. The school is fully internet wired and each classroom has a 65-inch interactive touch screen.

There is no Secondary School in Kildalkey. Children travel to schools in Athboy, Trim and Navan.
