= Kiltale GAA =

GAA club in Meath, Ireland

Kitale gaa
- Founded: 1936
- County: Meath
- Colours: Maroon and Green
- Grounds: Páirc na nGael, Kiltale
- Coordinates: 53°31′22.34″N 6°39′39.27″W

Playing kits
Standard colours

Senior Club Championships
	All Ireland	Leinster champions	Meath champions
Hurling:	-	-	9

Kiltale GAA is a Gaelic Athletic Association hurling club based in Kiltale, in County Meath, Ireland. The club was founded in the early 1920s, then disbanded in 1934 but reformed in 1946.

The club does not play Gaelic football; the county's football competitions are contested by the other club in the parish, Moynalvey.

The club has won the Meath Senior Hurling Championship nine times, including in 2018, when it completed a five-in-a-row of county titles. It regularly features in the latter stages of that championship. Underage sides representing the club have won several county titles in lower age grades.

The club also has a sister camogie club which shares its grounds.

== History ==
The history of Kiltale Hurling Club dates back to the early 1920s. The club disbanded in 1934 but was reformed in 1946. Kiltale won their first Junior Hurling Championship in 1954. The club reached the Senior Hurling Championship final twice in the late 1950s without success.

There was no club in the 1960s but in the 1970s, the club was reformed and won the Junior Hurling Championship in 1971, the Intermediate Hurling Championship in 1972, an under-14 Championship in 1975, and a second Intermediate title in 1978. In these early days of the modern club, Kiltale proved to be one of the most successful teams in Meath hurling.

The 1980s saw several successes, with the senior side winning the Meath Senior Hurling Championship in 1982 and 1983 and the O’Growney Cup in 1985 and 1987. In 1992 they won the Junior Hurling Championship and in 1999 they had success with the minors.

In 2003, Kiltale won a Junior C Hurling Championship and an U21 Championship. In 2005 and again in 2006 Kiltale won back to back Minor A Championships.

The senior team took championship honours in 2007, 2012, and a five-in-a-row of titles between 2014 and 2018. It has also competed at Leinster level, advancing to the latter stages of the Leinster Intermediate Club Championship, falling narrowly to Kilkenny sides Mullinavat in the 2014 final, Bennettsbridge in the 2015 decider, and Carrickshock in the 2016 semi-final. Both Bennettsbridge and Carrickshock went on to claim All-Ireland honours in those seasons, while their 2017 semi-final conquerors St Patrick's of Ballyragget were beaten by one point in the national decider.

== Honours ==
- Leinster Intermediate Club Hurling Championship: Runners-Up
  - 2014, 2015
- Meath Senior Hurling Championship: 9
  - 1982, 1983, 2007, 2012 2014, 2015, 2016, 2017, 2018
- O'Growney Cup: 2
  - 1985, 1987
- Meath Intermediate Hurling Championship: 2
  - 1972, 1978
- Meath Junior Hurling Championship: 4
  - 1971, 1992, 2012, 2025.
- Meath Intermediate Camogie Championship: 2
  - 2009, 2012
- Meath Junior Camogie Championship:3
  - 1999, 2000, 2001
