= Trim GAA =

Gaelic games club in County Meath, Ireland

- Ath Troim
- Founded: 1904
- County: Meath
- Colours: Red and White
- Grounds: St. Loman's Park
- Coordinates: 53°33′12.77″N 6°48′03.06″W

Playing kits
Standard colours

Senior Club Championships
	All Ireland	Leinster champions	Meath champions
Football:	-	-	1
Hurling:	-	-	26

Trim GAA is a Gaelic Athletic Association club based in Trim, in County Meath, Ireland. The club fields Gaelic football, hurling teams, Camogie teams and Peil na mBan (Ladies' Gaelic football) teams. It competes in Meath GAA competitions. Trim is known as the home of hurling in Meath and the Meath Senior Hurling Championship final was held there each year until the redevelopment of its facilities meant it was moved to Pairc Tailteann.

== 2011 season ==
Trim finished at the bottom of Group A, with 3 points from 5 games and point difference of -30, the lowest of any team that year. Trim's only win was a 1-15 to 1-10 defeat of Blackhall Gaels on 7 August 2011. Trim's first relegation play-off was against Nobber on 20 August, Trim were beaten 3-8 to 1-16.

On 9 September 2011, Trim were beaten 1-11 to 2-9 by Duleek/Bellewstown in Páirc Tailteann in their second relegation play-off and were relegated to the Intermediate Football Championship. Trim were promoted to Senior Level football in 1949 and relegation ended a 62-year spell at Senior level, the second longest spell after Skryne who have been in the Senior Football Championship since 1938.

== Honours ==
- Meath Senior Hurling Championship: 26
  - 1915 , 1916 , 1919 , 1920, 1921 , 1935, 1940, 1941, 1942, 1949, 1950, 1952, 1955, 1956, 1957, 1959, 1960, 1987, 1988, 1989, 1992, 1994, 1995, 1998, 2000, 2001, 2020, 2022
- Meath Senior Football Championship: 1
  - 1962
- Meath Intermediate Hurling Championship: 1
  - 1973
- Meath Junior Hurling Championship: 5
  - 1918, 1919, 1985, 1986, 2000, 2019
- Meath Intermediate Football Championship: 2
  - 1949, 2021
- Leinster Intermediate Club Football Championship: 1
  - 2021
- Meath Junior Football Championship: 2
  - 1934, 1940
- Meath Junior 2 Hurling Championship: 1
  - 1987
- Meath Junior B Football Championship: 4
  - 1978, 1991, 1998, 2010
- Feis Cup: 2
  - 1976, 1961
- Meath Minor Hurling A: 3
  - 2011, 2016, 2018, 2019, 2021

Preceded by Trim	Meath Senior Hurling Champions; 2001	Succeeded by Kilmessan

Preceded by Navan O'Mahonys	Meath Senior Football Champions; 1962	Succeeded by Navan O'Mahonys
