= Kilmessan =

Village in County Meath, Ireland

Kilmessan Irish: Cill Mheasáin
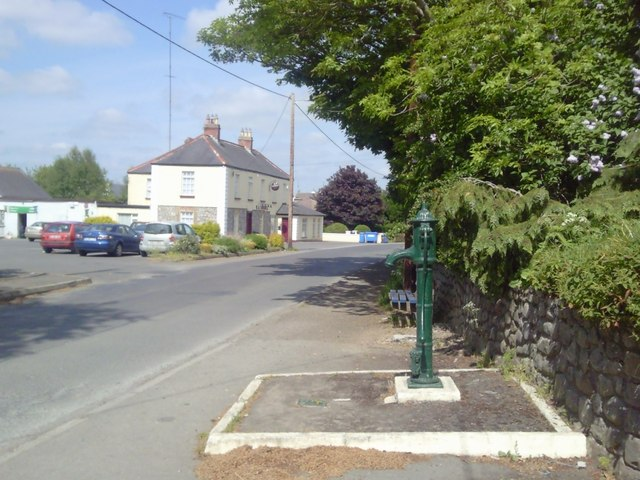
- Village pump, Kilmessan

- Location in Ireland Kilmessan (Europe)
- Coordinates: 53.559192°N 6.660144°W
- Country: Ireland
- Province: Leinster
- County: County Meath
- Dáil Éireann: Meath West

Population (2016)
  - Total: 654
- Time zone: UTC±0 (WET)
  - Summer (DST): UTC+1 (IST)
- Eircode routing key: C15
- Telephone area code: +353(0)46

Kilmessan (Irish: Cill Mheasáin, meaning 'Church of Messan') is a village in County Meath, Ireland. It is 11 km south of Navan (14 km by road) and 9 km east of Trim (11 km by road). The village has a primary school, shop, post office, several pubs, and the Station House Hotel. The village is in a townland and civil parish of the same name.

== Sport ==
Kilmessan GAA club plays hurling. They are the most successful hurling club in Meath having won the Meath championship 29 times. The Kilmessan men won the Leinster Intermediate Championship in 2008 and lost out on reaching the All-Ireland final after losing the semi-final after extra-time. Kilmessan also has a Camogie club. Kilmessan became All-Ireland junior club champions in 2014 and again in 2017. In 2013 the village completed a "double", when both the senior hurling and senior camogie succeed within the county to gain the title of county champions within the same weekend.

Kilmessan Bowls Club is affiliated to the Irish Indoor Bowling Association (IIBA).
