= Longwood, County Meath =

Village in County Meath, Ireland

Longwood Irish: Maigh Dearmhaí
- Village
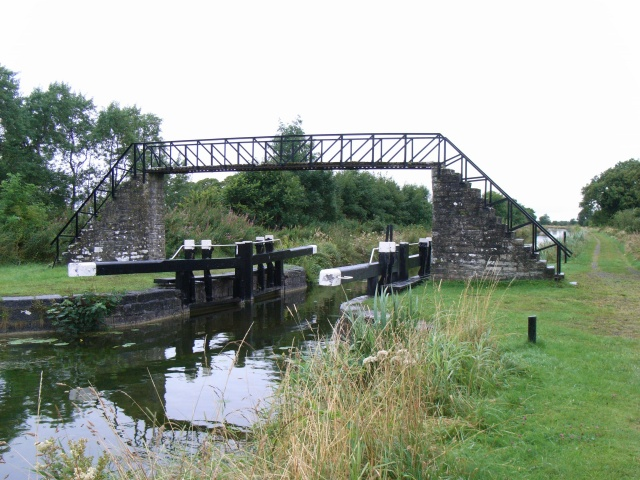
- Ribbontail bridge and lock across the Royal Canal near Longwood

- Location in Ireland
- Coordinates: 53°27′16″N 6°55′31″W
- Country: Ireland
- Province: Leinster
- County: County Meath
- Elevation: 70 m (230 ft)

Population (2016)
  - Total: 1,581
- Time zone: UTC+0 (WET)
  - Summer (DST): UTC-1 (IST (WEST))
- Irish Grid Reference: N710455

Longwood, historically called Moydervy (Irish: Maigh Dearmhaí), is a village in southwest County Meath, Ireland. It is located about 15 km south of the town of Trim on the R160 regional road. It is about 50 km from Dublin, off the N4 road. In the early years of the 21st century the population of Longwood increased dramatically, with the population more than trebling from 480 inhabitants as of the 2002 census, to 1,581 people as of the 2016 census; the 2016 census indicated that 65% of homes in the village (317 of 488 households) were built between 2001 and 2010.

== History ==
The Boyne aqueduct, built in the 19th century where the canal crosses over the River Boyne is located about 3 km from the village.

=== Medieval period ===
Longwood is recorded as a possession of the Hospital of Crutched Friars of St. John the Baptist, at Newtown Trim, at the dissolution of the monasteries in 1540. The jurors recorded that at Longwood alias Modarvy there was a castle, six houses, 40 acres arable, 60 acres pasture, moor and underwood, valued at 40 shillings sterling. In 1611-1612 James I granted to Christopher Plunkett, knight, a castle, six houses, 40 acres arable land, 60 acres pasture, bog and underwood in Longwood, otherwise called Mordervie or Moydervy. This grant is consistent with the description of Longwood some seventy years earlier. As important for the development of Longwood is the fact that James 1st also granted a fair by patent in 1611. Only the fairs at Athboy, Duleek, Ballyboggan, Kells, Navan, Trim and Ratoath are older, some eighteen in Meath are later in date of grant. The Down Survey barony map of Moyfenrath outlines the townland of Longwood but does not depict any buildings or features. The Civil Survey, however, mentions a castle, a mill and a weir, and that Longwood is in the possession of Nicholas Plunkett, a Catholic, and presumably a descendant of Christopher Plunkett mentioned above.

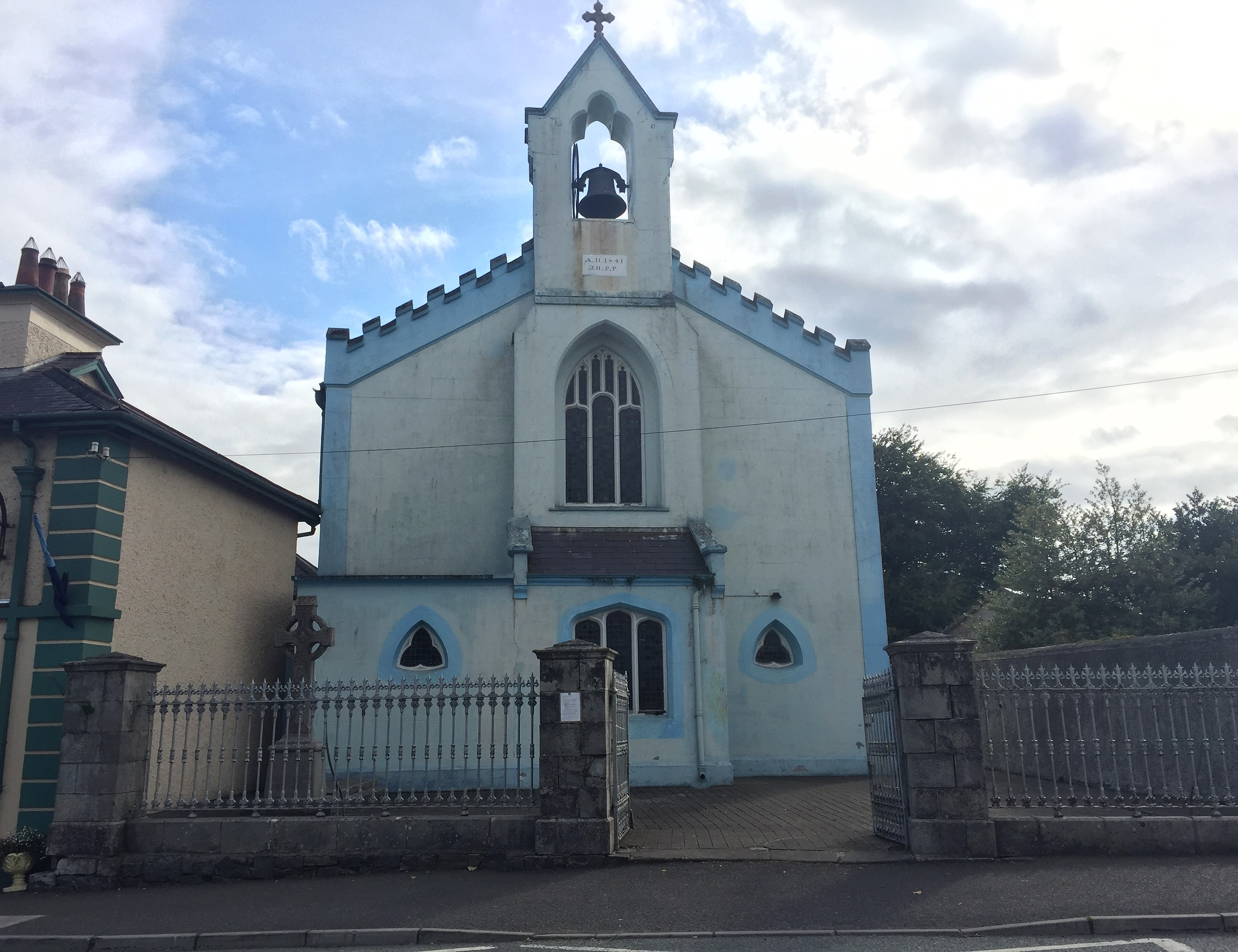
St. Mary's Church of the Assumption, Longwood

Edward Tyrrell of Lynn County Westmeath was created a Baronet in 1680. Edward married Eleanor Loftus, the granddaughter of Sir James Ware, auditor-general of Ireland and famous historian. Their only child Catherine married Robert Edgeworth of Longwood. Robert Edgeworth was in possession of Longwood from the 1680s if not before. The estates of Edward Tyrrell who was attained in 1688 were later restored to Robert Edgeworth of Longwood. Edgeworthstown in County Longford is also associated with this family and perhaps received more attention and patronage than did Longwood.

=== 19th century development ===
The location of a fair at Longwood is apparent from its depiction in Larkin's map of 1812. It depicts housing around each side of a triangular green and a wide road leading off the green to the east. The fair green function is confirmed by Carlisle writing in 1810: "The fairs are held 1 July, Whit-Tuesday, 12 July and 11 December". The population of Longwood was 398 in 1813, dropping to 300 in 1821. This suggests a population of agricultural labourers in Longwood in the early nineteenth century, a demand for their skills following the end of hostilities between England and France; however, by 1837 the population, according to Lewis, had risen again to 425 souls, occupying 83 houses.

The OS 1st edition map, 1837, depicts a number of houses around the triangular green, the majority on the west and south sides without garden plots to the rear. This suggests a number of cabins, a fact confirmed by the large amount of 4th class housing recorded at Longwood in 1843. Sixty-nine percent of the housing at Longwood consisted of conglomerations of mud cabins inhabited by agricultural and rural labourers. Places like Stamullen (73%) and Bohermeen (67%), by comparison, fared no better. There was more substantial housing along the south side of the street leading to the green – formal plots behind these houses indicates this. In 1837 the police station was located at the east end of the village, at the junction of the Trim to Enfield road with the village. Hidden away on the opposite corner was the Catholic church, well back from the street, and an unusual L-shaped plan. Lewis described this church as "a large plain edifice". In 1824 there were two schools in Longwood (one is indicated on the OS 1ed map, north of the police station). Those in Longwood were held in mud-walled thatched houses and were attended by 79 Catholics and 10 Protestants in 1824.

The present Catholic church was built in 1841 and has been renovated several times since. Unlike the previous building it faces onto the road behind railings and gates in a north-east south-west orientation. Built in a late-Gothic style, the western bellcote is treated as a buttress.

The former parochial house dates to or was remodelled in 1845, when the property was leased from the Edgeworths by the parish priest. It has three bays and two storeys with an advanced central two-bay porch. It is rendered with raised quoins and window surrounds. Raised quoins either in limestone or painted stucco are a feature of several other substantial two-storey hipped-roofed houses in the village.

== Amenities ==
Longwood has a primary and second-level school. A fair green is located between its old primary school and the Garda Síochána station. The village has 3 grocery stores, a post office and 4 public houses.

Longwood GAA club was founded in 1904 and recently upgraded their facilities, which now include the bar, function room and a floodlit pitch. Also in Longwood there is an antique store, chipper, hair salon, news agents, Spar, Chinese take away, funeral directors, hardware store part of Johnny Dargans Public House and a motor bike spare parts shop. There is also a Scout Group in Longwood, the 17th Meath Longwood Scout Group which operates out of the Community hall.

== Characteristics ==
One of its main characteristics is a wide main street. In July 2008 Meath County Council placed road markings in Longwood which included designated car parking spots. In close proximity to the village is the River Blackwater and a little further away is the River Boyne and the Royal Canal.

== Notable people ==
- Thomas Allen - a member of the Irish Volunteers who fought and died in the 1916 Easter Rising
- Eamonn Duggan - one of the Irish delegation who signed the Anglo-Irish Treaty in 1921 and Minister for Home Affairs in the Provisional government formed after the Treaty
- Patrick Giles - former IRB member, politician and long-serving TD
- Rev. John Kyne - former Bishop of Meath.
