= Meath GAA =

County board of the Gaelic Athletic Association in Ireland

- Irish: An Mhí
- Nickname(s): The Royal County
- Province: Leinster
- Dominant sport: Gaelic football
- Ground(s): Páirc Tailteann, Navan
- County colours: Green Gold

County teams
- Football Championship: Sam Maguire Cup
- Hurling Championship: Christy Ring Cup
- Ladies' Gaelic football: Brendan Martin Cup
- Camogie: Jack McGrath Cup

The Meath County Board of the Gaelic Athletic Association (Irish: Cumann Lúthchleas Gael Coiste na Mí), or Meath GAA, is one of the 32 county boards of the GAA in Ireland, and is responsible for Gaelic games in County Meath, as well as for Meath county teams.

== Football ==
=== County team ===
The first notable Meath team was the Navan O’Mahonys GAA club from Navan that represented the county in the All-Ireland final of 1895, when the competition used to be played between the champion clubs from each county. O'Mahony's lost to Arravale Rovers of Tipperary by 0-4 to 0-3. The county had to wait until 1939 for its next appearance at All-Ireland level, this time losing narrowly to Kerry by 2-5 to 2-3 in the final. In the intervening period, the county had achieved its first national success by winning the National League of 1933. All-Ireland success finally came in 1949 when Meath beat Cavan in the final by 1-10 to 1-6. This first great Meath team achieved a second title in 1954, beating Kerry in the final, 1-13 to 1-7. In between these two successes, they appeared in two other finals, losing in 1951 and 1952 to Mayo and Cavan, respectively. They also lost out in the National League final of 1951 to Cavan.

During this period, their Leinster Championship rivalry with Louth became legendary: in the six provincial championships between 1948 and 1953 the sides met each year. The 1949 match went to three meetings, while those of 1950 and 1951 were replayed.

Meath's team of the 1960s was characterised by a chronic inability to score until after half-time, but might have reached the 1964 All-Ireland final had a goal by Jack Quinn not been controversially disallowed in the semi-final. Meath were beaten in the 1966 All-Ireland final by a legendary Galway team that was winning its third All-Ireland title in a row. After the 1966 final defeat, centre-back Bertie Cunningham declared that "next year, we will come back and win the All-Ireland". Sure enough, Terry Kearns secured the Sam Maguire Cup for Meath with a punched goal in the 1967 final to defeat Cork.

Meath won the National Football League in 1975 and looked a promising prospect for the All-Ireland. Defeat at the hands of Kevin Heffernan's Dublin team, however, was an indication of what was to come. Heffo's Dubs prevented Meath from winning provincial titles, before an Offaly team emerged to win more Leinster titles and become the only team capable of challenging the Kerry team that dominated football between 1975 and 1986.

Meath looked far from All-Ireland Championship material when losing to Wexford in 1981 and Longford in 1982. By the time the 1983 Leinster began, Meath had appointed the hurling team's masseur, Sean Boylan, as football manager, and few could have predicted the success that would come to the county under his reign. Boylan's initial appointment was greeted with scepticism as it had always been known that he was a capable hurler, but his role in football had been seen as merely repairing the players, not training them. Boylan's first task was to prepare Meath for an opening match against a Dublin team led by legendary midfielder Brian Mullins. The first match resulted in a draw, as a result of a fortunate ricochet shot from Barney Rock against new Meath half back Colm Coyle. The replay also ended with level scores, with Boylan gaining public support as a trainer of real substance. Dublin, however, went on to win the second replay in extra time, before going on to win the All-Ireland that year. Meath not yet being seen as Championship-winning material.

The 1980s team progressed cautiously towards victory. They missed full-back Mick Lyons for the 1984 Leinster final against Dublin and in 1985 slipped up against Laois in the semi-final. It was therefore not until 1986 that Meath won the first of three consecutive Leinster titles, and followed it up with All-Ireland victories over Cork in 1987 and 1988, the latter following a replay. Meath also secured the National Football League title in 1988. The Meath team of 1988 to this day, proves to be one of the most successful teams of all time. In this year, Boylan's men won the Leinster SFC, All-Ireland SFC, and the National Football League. In 1989 the champions were defeated by Dublin, while in 1990 Cork defeated Meath, completing a historic All-Ireland Hurling and Football double.

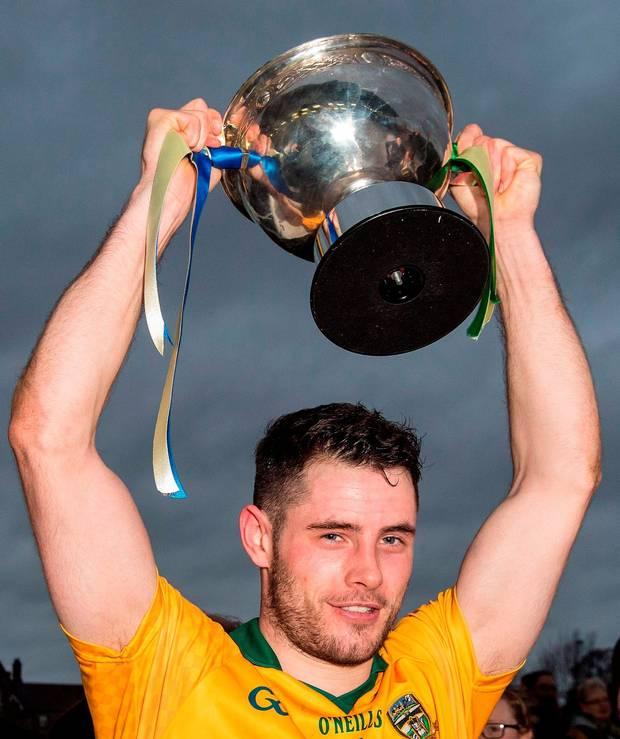
Meath captain Donal Keogan lifts the O'Byrne Cup in 2016

A new team was formed for 1995. This team included many new stars like Trevor Giles and Graham Geraghty. However, these younger players were largely inexperienced for championship football and came up short against a Dublin team determined to win the Championship outright. The resultant 10-point drubbing left a strong impression on the younger Meath players of how much work was needed to win silverware. In 1996 Meath were not expected to be successful and many were surprised to see the team reach another Leinster final against Dublin. Leading 0-10 to 0-8 in the driving rain at the death, a ball was lobbed towards the Meath goal. Meath supporters were delighted to hear the referee blow his whistle for a free out for pushing by Dublin players as the ball was in the air. Meath were Leinster champions again. In beating a consistent Tyrone side in the semi-final, Sean Boylan managed to lead the same team that got nowhere in 1995 to an All-Ireland final in 1996. Meath came back from six points down to force a draw with Mayo in the 1996 All-Ireland Senior Football Championship final, forcing a replay. On 29 September 1996, with both sides having been reduced to 14 men following an infamous brawl early in the game, Meath again came from behind and defeated Mayo by 2-9 to 1-11 to claim their sixth All-Ireland. Captain Tommy Dowd, who was living in the Meath Gaeltacht, produced probably the longest victory speech ever given by a Leinster captain.

1997 saw Meath start the Championship against an ambitious Kildare team coached by the Kerry legend Mick O'Dwyer. Meath's previous record against Kildare had been excellent and Meath were expected to be sufficient. O'Dwyer's appointment created massive support in Kildare for their team though and ensured that the opening match had full attendance in Croke Park, with Kildare fans outnumbering Meath fans. This was a sign of the times as a few years earlier Meath were one of the best supported of any county but their supporters had become accustomed to success under Boylan and no longer travelled to big games in large numbers. The match saw Kildare emerge displaying an unexpected quality of football. Kildare led for most of the match with Meath only managing to draw level in the last minute. The replay finished level after ordinary time and extra time was now required to produce a winner. In extra time Kildare created a six-point lead. Then Boylan produced a tactical masterstroke introducing substitute Jody Devine who scored six points in quick succession and helping Meath pull ahead by a single point before Kildare grabbed a freakish point to end the match in yet another draw. The sides therefore met again in a third match. This time the weather had changed and the match was played in rain. Again Meath's determination and bravery and skill earned a strong victory; however as in 1991 this sequence of matches had resulted in accumulated injuries. Meath were without a meaningful defence in the Leinster Senior Football Championship Final against Offaly and the Offaly attack ran riot.

In 1998 Meath produced a performance against Offaly that was like the effect of an unwound spring. However Kildare had already managed to beat a transitional Dublin side and were now playing again at a very high level of fitness and determination. The 1998 Leinster Final between Meath and Kildare was a bad-tempered affair with Meath's Brendan Reilly sent off for a dangerous foul on Kildare centre-back Declan Kerrigan. Kildare's fitness began to cause Meath more problems as the Lilywhites again attacked in waves. This time Kildare had learnt the lessons of the previous year and produced greater more well-taken scores. Kildare held onto a last attack by Meath ended in a questionable refereeing decision which resulted in Kildare moving the ball swiftly downfield. This presented an opportunity for Kildare to expose gaps in the Meath defence due to Kildare's numerical superiority and the resulting goal firmly clinched the match for Kildare.

Meath won the 1999 Leinster Championship with emphatic wins over Wicklow (2-10 to 0-6), Offaly (1-13 to 0-9), and their great rivals Dublin (1-14 to 0-12). Meath then reached another All-Ireland final against their rivals of decade previously, Cork. Meath won their seventh All-Ireland on a scoreline of 1-11 to 1-8.

Meath won the Leinster title again in 2001 beating Dublin for the 4th time in the championship in 6 years eg 1996, 1997, 1999, 2001. Meath played the most successful county in gaelic football, kerry in the semi-final. A kerry team which were reigning All Ireland champions and were managed by the Legendary Paudi O'Se. A team that included great players such as Seamus Moynihan, Dara O'Se, Mike Frank Russell and Maurice Fitzgerald. Meath and Kerry had won 4 of the previous 5 All Ireland titles. Meath won in 1996 and 1999 and kerry won in 1997 and 2000. It was a contest between two great All Ireland winning teams. Kerry were slightly favourites, but Meath produced an outstanding performance of swashbuckling attacking football and won by a record 15 points. It is kerry worst defeat in the championship in the last 120 years.

Meath went into the 2001 All-Ireland final as overwhelming favourites after their exceptional football performance v kerry in the semi-final. The scores were tied at 0-7 each at half time in what was a careful and cautious match, as Darren Fay held Galway's star full-forward Pádraic Joyce scoreless. Joyce was switched to corner forward at half time and Galway quickly built up an early lead in the Second half. Meath centre-half back Nigel Nestor was sent off for a second bookable offence - a foul on Jarlath Fallon - before star Meath forward Ollie Murphy, who was the most effective Meath forward that day, sustained a broken hand after being trod upon. These changes to the balance between the teams gave Galway an edge on the field that they had already been preparing in their own inner resolve. Just as the match seemed to be slipping away from Meath, though, John McDermott raised another attack on the Galway defence that resulted in a penalty awarded to Meath. Trevor Giles, Meath's captain and free-taker, was allocated the responsibility for this task as part of his team role. His shot, however, drifted agonisingly wide, and with it went Meath's chances of getting back into the game. From there, the outstanding Padraig Joyce continued to bedevil the Meath defence - eclipsing Mark O'Reilly in doing so - the Meath management all to belatedly sought to rectify the problem by putting Darren Fay back on Joyce, and Galway ran out emphatic victors on a 0-17 to 0-8 scoreline.

The 2010 season, in which the team were managed by Eamonn O'Brien, began with the side beating Offaly despite poor performance before reaching the quarter-final to face Laois in a very rain soaked Croke Park which was dragged to extra-time but ended up in a replay the week after. Meath won well before sending old rivals Dublin for the first time since 2001 to reach the Leinster final. This was played on 11 July 2010, against neighbouring Louth. Meath won the match but both the way the match ended and the violent reaction of some Louth supporters led to controversy. Deep into injury time in the 74th minute of the match, a goal was awarded to Meath by the referee after brief consultation with only one of the match umpires. Television coverage of the game proved that the ball was carried over the line by Meath player Joe Sherdian. Prior to the goal being awarded Meath had trailed by 1 point and with the referee blowing his whistle shortly afterwards this proved to be the decisive score. Irate Louth fans stormed the pitch and commenced a process of chasing and physically assaulting the referee, who had to be led away by a Garda escort in scenes broadcast to a live television audience. Other scenes of violence saw bottles being hurled from a stand, one striking a steward who fell to the ground and Meath substitute Mark Ward was hit by a Louth fan. The situation led to much media debate in the days that followed, the violence was condemned and there were many calls for the game to be replayed in the national Media (including former Meath players Trevor Giles and Bernard Flynn.). GAA President Christy Cooney said the events were a "watershed" and one where the "circumstances were bizarre. I have never seen circumstances like it as long as I have been a member of this Association". He promised life bans for those who assaulted the referee. The day after the match the GAA released a statement confirming that Sludden admitted he had made an error. The GAA also stated that the rules left it powerless to offer a replay and that this would be decided by Meath, Following a Meath County Board meeting it emerged that in his match report that the referee had originally blown for a penalty for Meath but when the ball ended in the net decided to award the goal. The county board decided not to offer of a replay and that that would be "the end of the matter".

=== Clubs ===
List of active football clubs in Meath:

Club	Irish Name	Location	Colours
Curraha	Currach Átha	Curraha	Green and Gold
Donaghmore-Ashbourne	Domhnach Mór-Cill Dhéagláin	Donaghmore and Ashbourne	Green and White
Dunshaughlin	Domhnach Seachnaill	Dunshaughlin and Culmullen	Black and Yellow
Gaeil Colmcille	Gaeil Colmcille	Kells, Fyanstown and Girley	White, Red and Green
Longwood	Maigh Dearmhaí	Longwood	Sam Dixon
Moynalvey	Maigh nAilbhe	Moynalvey and Kiltale	Maroon and White
Na Fianna	Na Fianna	Enfield and Baconstown	Yellow and Black
Navan O'Mahonys	Ó Mathúna An Uaimh	Navan South	Blue and White
Rathkenny	Ráth Cheannaigh	Rathkenny and Grangegeeth	Black and Red
Ratoath	Ráth Tó	Ratoath	Blue and Gold
Seneschalstown	Baile Sencaill	Kentstown and Beauparc	White and Blue
Simonstown Gaels	Gaeil Bhaile Shíomóin	Navan North	Navy and Blue
Skryne	Scrín	Skryne and Rathfeigh	Blue and White
St Colmcille's	Naomh Colmcille	Piltown and Bettystown	Blue and Navy
St Patrick's	Naomh Phádraig	Stamullen and Julianstown	White and Green
St Peter's, Dunboyne	Naomh Peadar Dún Boínne	Dunboyne	Yellow and Black
Summerhill	Druim Samhraidh	Summerhill and Coole	Blue and Yellow
Wolfe Tones	Bhuilf Tón	Baile Órthaí, Baile Ghib, Wilkinstown and Kilberry	Yellow and Purple
Ballinabrackey	Baile an Breacaighe	Ballinabrackey and Castlejordan	Green and Gold
Ballinlough	Baile an Locha	Ballinlough	Red and White
Blackhall Gaels	Gaeil Bhláth Gall	Kilcloon and Batterstown	Blue and Yellow
Bective	Beag Teach	Bective	White and Green
Castletown	Baile an Chaisleáin	Castletown Kilpatrick	Green and Gold
Donaghmore-Ashbourne 2	Domhnach Mór-Cill Dhéagláin	Donaghmore and Ashbourne, County Meath	Green and White
Drumbaragh Emmets	Emmettaigh Druim Bhearradh	Drumbaragh	Green and Red
Duleek Bellewstown	Daimhliagh/Baile Beiliú	Duleek and Bellewstown	Green and Yellow
Dunderry	Dún Doire	Dunderry and Robinstown	Black and White
Kilmainham	Cill Mhaighneann	Kilmainham	Red and Black
Meath Hill	Cnoc Na Mhi	Meath Hill	Blue and White
Nobber	An Obair	Nobber	Black and Amber
Oldcastle	Sean Chaisleáin	Oldcastle	Blue and White
St Michaels	Naomh Mícheál	Kilbeg	Black and Red
St Peter's, Dunboyne 2	Naomh Peadar, Dun Boínne	Dunboyne	Black and Yellow
Syddan	Sódan	Lobinstown and Newtown	Green and Yellow
Trim	Áth Troim	Trim	Red and White
Walterstown	Baile an Bhailtearaigh	Walterstown, Johnstown, Oldtown and Dowdstown	All Black
Ballivor	Baile Íomhair	Ballivor	Maroon and White
Boardsmill	Bord an Mhuillinn	Boardsmill	Blue and White
Cortown	Baile Corr	Cortown	Green and Gold
Carnaross	Carn na Ros	Carnaross	Maroon and Gold
Clann na nGael	Clann na nGael	Athboy, Ráth Cairn and Rathmore	Green, White and Gold
Clonard	Cluain Ioraird	Clonard	Blue and Gold
Drumconrath	Droim Conrach	Drumconrath	Red and White
Dunsany	Dún Samhna	Dunsany and Kilmessan	Red and White
Kilbride	Cill Bhríde	Kilbride	Green, Red & White
Kilmainhamwood	Coill Chille Mhaighneann	Kilmainhamwood	White and Blue
Moylagh	Maigh Locha	Moylagh, County Meath	Green and White
Moynalty	Magh nEalta	Moynalty and Newcastle	Red and White
Slane	Baile Shláine	Slane and Monknewtown	Blue and White
St Brigids	Naomh Bríd	Ballinacree	Red and White
St Mary's	Naomh Mhuire	Donore	Green and Red
St Pauls	Naomh Pól	Clonee	All Red
St Ultans	Naomh Ultain	Bohermeen	Green and Black
St Vincents	Naomh Uinsionn	Ardcath and Clonalvy	Maroon and White

== Hurling ==
=== Clubs ===
Clubs contest the Meath Senior Hurling Championship. That competition's most successful club is Kilmessan, with 29 titles.

=== County team ===
Meath has twice held half-time leads over traditional hurling counties in the quarter-final of the Leinster Senior Hurling Championship (SHC): over Dublin by a scoreline of 2–2 to 1–1 in 1936 and Kilkenny by a scoreline of 2–6 to 1–6 in 1949.

In 1951, the county held Wexford to a draw in the quarter-final but lost the replay; Wexford went on to win the Leinster SHC and join the elite.

Having beaten Offaly to qualify for their ninth and last Leinster SHC semi-final in 1954, Meath regressed until it won the 1985 Kehoe Cup and the 1993 Senior B title.

After the county re-entered the senior championship in 1994, its exploits included victories over Offaly (All-Ireland SHC champions at the time) by a scoreline of 1–12 to 1–11 in a February 1995 National Hurling League match in Athboy and Wexford by a scoreline of 1–16 to 0–16 a fortnight later in Enniscorthy.

In the 21st-century, Meath won the 2009 Nicky Rackard Cup, the 2016 Christy Ring Cup and the 2020 Christy Ring Cup. The 2016 final was particularly prolonged; on 4 June 2016, Meath won the final at Croke Park against Antrim by a scoreline of 2–18 to 1–20, despite trailing the Ulster squad by as much as six points at times. However, the score actually finished 2-17 to 1-20, a draw. So despite Meath being presented with the Christy Ring Cup, a replay was ordered. The replay took place at Croke Park on 25 June 2016. After normal time, the result was 3–15 to 4–12, another draw. Meath eventually prevailed after extra-time by a scoreline of 4–21 to 5–17, a Stephen Clynch free with the last puck of the game sealing Meath's first ever Christy Ring Cup and a place in the 2017 Leinster Senior Hurling Championship, the county's first appearance in the championship since a double scores defeat to Laois in mid-May 2004. The county secured a surprise victory against Kerry in its opening Leinster SHC match.

== Camogie ==
Meath won the Nancy Murray Cup in 2008. Ratoath won divisional honours at Féile na nGael in 2008 and 2009. They were finalists in the All-Ireland Minor Camogie Championship at Minor C level in 2011.

Julian McDonnell was the referee for the All Ireland senior final of 1933.

People don't know the hardships that some camogie teams go through and we are the county team, not even the local team. And the benefits are phenomenal. Any of the girls will tell you...

— Meath Camogie Chairman Kieran Devaney in August 2026,

Players from the county team often form waste disposal teams and don hi-vis materials to collect bags of rubbish. Their efforts have been noted in national print.

Under Camogie's National Development Plan 2010-2015, "Our Game, Our Passion", five new camogie clubs were to be established in the county by 2015.

== Ladies' football ==
Meath won their first All-Ireland Senior title in 2021 after running the Intermediate title in 2020.

Meath women have dominated the ladies' section of the All-Ireland Kick Fada Championship, with wins for Mary Sheridan in 2003, 2008 and 2010; Gráinne Nulty in 2004; Irene Munnelly in 2005, 2007 and 2011; and Gillian Bennett in 2006.

Meath have the following achievements in ladies' football.

- All-Ireland Senior Ladies' Football Championships: 2
  - 2021, 2022
- All-Ireland Intermediate Ladies' Football Championships: 1
  - 2020
- All-Ireland Junior Ladies' Football Championships: 1
  - 1994
- All-Ireland Under-16 Ladies' Football Championships: 3
  - 2000, 2001, 2009
- All-Ireland Under-14 Ladies' Football Championships: 1
  - 1996
