= R154 road (Ireland) =

Road in Ireland

R154 road
- Bóthar R154
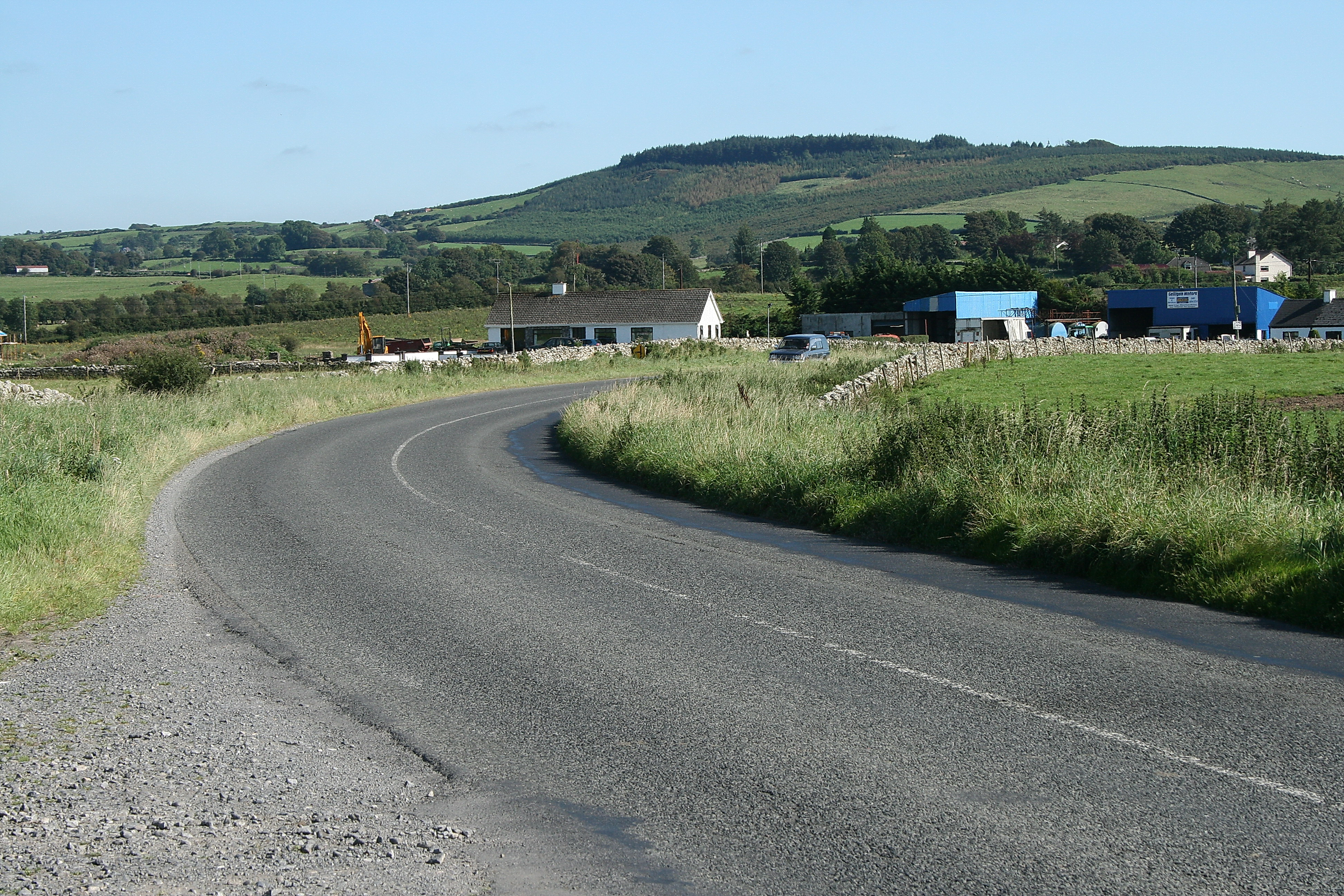
- R154 south of Oldcastle, Slieve na Calliagh in the background

Route information
- Length: 91 km (57 mi)

Location
- Country: Ireland
- Primary destinations: County Meath; Black Bull - (leaves R147); Batterstown; Old Cross Keys; Kiltale; Trim (inner relief road) (R160, R161, R158, R898) River Boyne; Athboy - (joins/leaves N51); Crosses (N52); Kilskeer; Crossakeel; (R163); Oldcastle (R195); County Cavan; Mountnugent; (R194); Kilnaleck; Crosses the River Erne; Ballinagh (N55); Crossdoney - terminates at junction with the R198

Highway system
- Roads in Ireland; Motorways; Primary; Secondary; Regional

The R154 road is a regional road in Ireland, linking the R147 near Clonee, County Meath to Crossdoney (near Cavan) in County Cavan. The road is single carriageway throughout. Many parts of the route have dangerous bends.

== Route ==
The route leaves the R147 near Black Bull in the townland of Piercetown, roughly 10 km (6.2 mi) north of Clonee in County Meath. The route passes through small settlements and townlands, including Kiltale, on the way to Trim. At Trim, the route bypasses the town centre along the Inner Relief Road, with junctions to the R160, R158 and R161. From Trim the R154 runs north to meet the N51 at Athboy.

The route leaves the N51 on the west side of Athboy, and runs north to cross the N52 just south of Kilskeer. The route continues north/northwest to Oldcastle, meeting the R163 along the way, just north of Crossakeel. At Oldcastle the R154 crosses the R195. The route continues northeast through Mount Nugent in County Cavan, joining the R194 after that at a staggered junction. The route leaves the R194, continuing northeast through Kilnaleck, and across the N55 at Ballinagh. The route ends at Crossdoney, meeting the R198 about 10 km (6.2 mi) southwest of Cavan.

== See also ==
- Roads in Ireland
- National primary road
- National secondary road
