= Crossakiel =

Village in County Meath, Ireland

Crossakiel Crosa Caoil
- Village
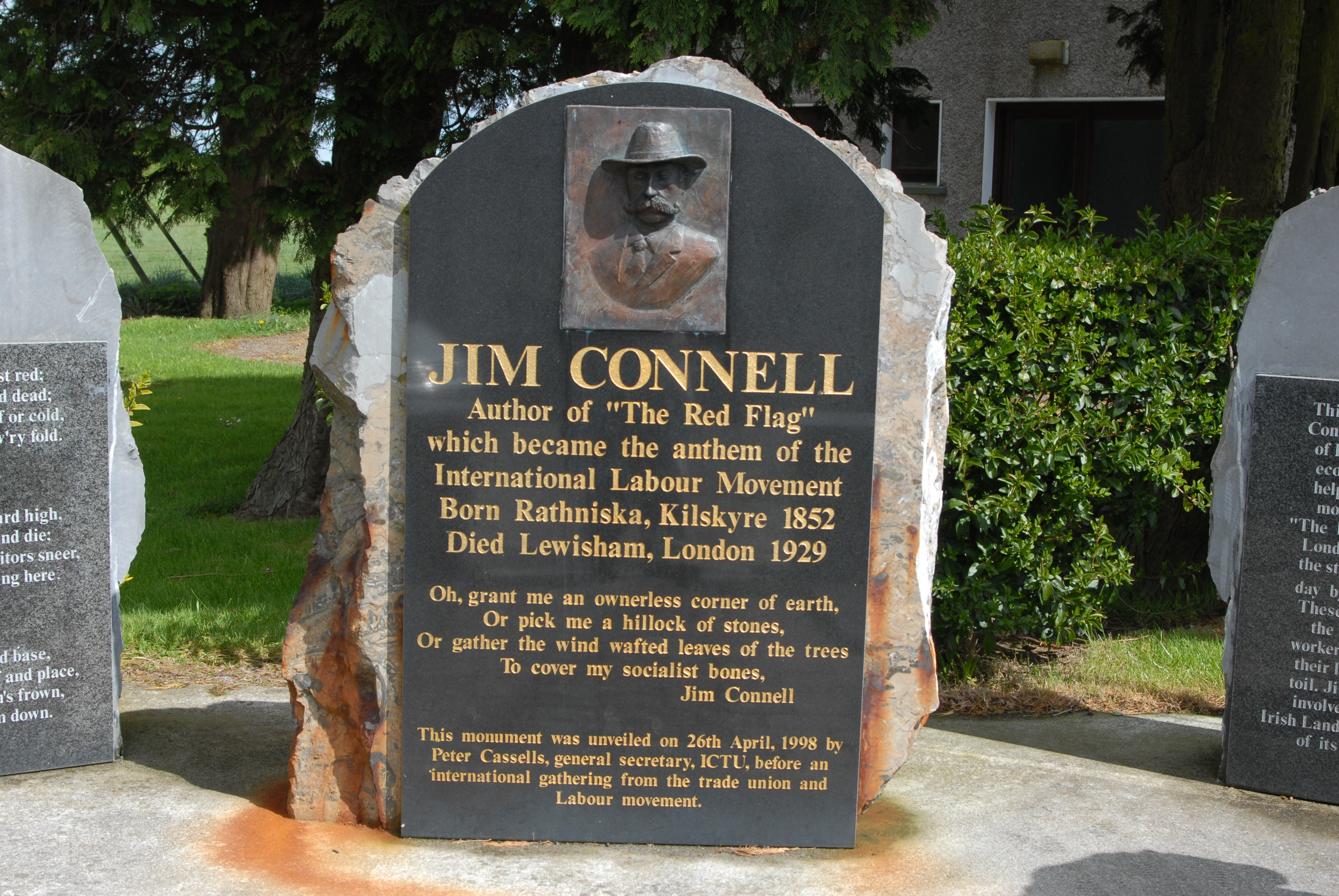
- Jim Connell memorial in Crossakiel

- Location in Ireland
- Coordinates: 53°42′47″N 7°01′06″W
- Country: Ireland
- Province: Leinster
- County: County Meath
- Elevation: 156 m (512 ft)

Population (2016)
  - Total: 181
- Time zone: UTC+00:00 (GMT)
  - Summer (DST): UTC+01:00 (Irish Standard Time)

Crossakiel or Crossakeel (Irish: Crosa Caoil, meaning "the crosses of Caol") is a village in County Meath, Ireland. It is situated in the north-west of the county, at the junction of the R154 and the L2801, approximately 13 km south of Oldcastle and 12 km north of Athboy.

== History ==
It is believed that a settlement may have existed in Crossakiel since the Bronze Age, as evidenced by the barrow mound in the centre of the village, around which the 19th-century village has developed.

Following the Siege of Drogheda in 1649, it is believed that during his conquest of Ireland, Oliver Cromwell surveyed the view over the nearby townland of Clonabreany from Crossakiel Hill, when he gave 2,000 acres of land that was previously owned by the Plunkett family to the Wade family, which resulted in the construction of a Norman castle and settlement. This was later demolished to facilitate the construction of Clonabreany House, which is now a wedding venue.

Crossakiel in 1837 was a post town with 200 inhabitants living in 60 houses and amenities including a police station, a Church of Ireland church, a pharmacy and a primary school.

== Geography ==
Crossakiel is situated in north-west County Meath, near the border with County Cavan. It is 3 km from Kilskyre, 9 km from Kells, 13 km from Oldcastle and 12 km from Athboy.

Situated at the crossroads of the R154 regional road and the L2801 local road, the latter linking to the R163 regional road between Oldcastle and Kells, the village is built around a triangular green known locally as "The Diamond".

The Tremblestown River, which is located around 1.1 km west of the village is a tributary of the Kells Blackwater.

== Facilities ==
There is no primary school in the village, with the nearest primary schools in Kilskyre and Drumbaragh and secondary schools in Kells and Athboy.

There are two public houses in the village - McCabe's and The Welcome Wagon.

A handball alley is also situated in Crossakiel. The sport has been played in the village since as early as the 1920s.

While there is no Catholic church in the village, St Shiria's Church on its southern outskirts previously served the Church of Ireland populace in the parish of Kilskyre, with records dating back to May 1761. The church was deconsecrated on 26 January 1962, with Meath County Council taking ownership in 1981.

== Transportation ==
Since 27 October 2024 Bus Éireann route 187 serves the village eleven times a day, linking it to Kells, Oldcastle, Virginia, Ballyjamesduff, and other localities along the route. Traditionally the village was not served by a public transport service, with nearby connections at Athboy, Kells and Oldcastle.

== See also ==
- List of towns and villages in Ireland
