= R156 road (Ireland) =

Road in Ireland

R156 road
- Bóthar R156
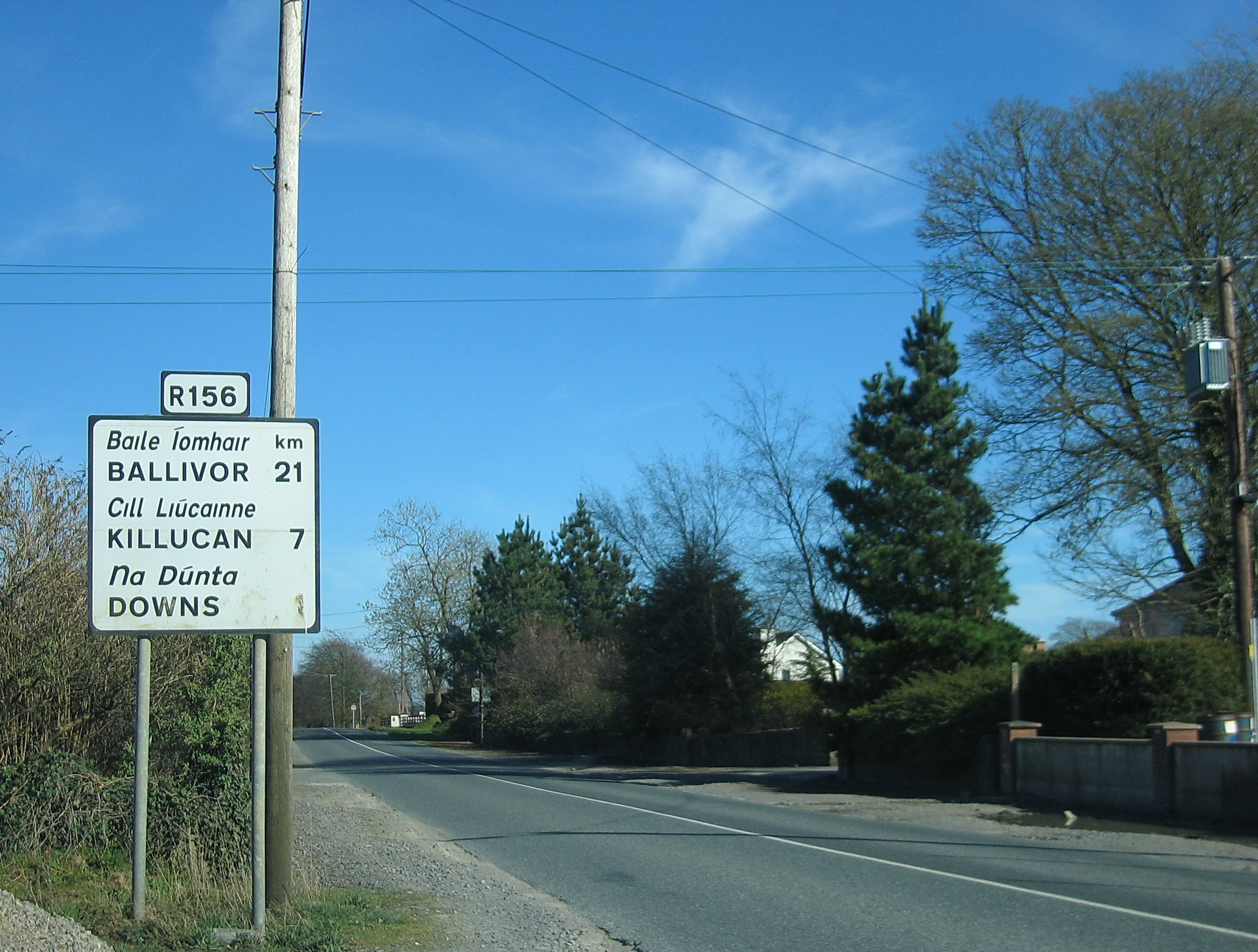
- Heading east after leaving the N4

Route information
- Length: 60 km (37 mi)

Location
- Country: Ireland
- Primary destinations: County Meath; Dunboyne – R157; Mullagh, County Meath; R125; Kilmore Cross Roads; Joins R158; Summerhill – leaves R158; R163; Rathmolyon – R159; R160; R161; Scariff Bridge crosses the River Boyne; Ballivor; County Westmeath; Raharney; Killucan; The Downs; terminates at the N4

Highway system
- Roads in Ireland; Motorways; Primary; Secondary; Regional

The R156 road is a regional road in Ireland, linking Dunboyne in County Meath to the N4 (near Mullingar) in County Westmeath. The road is single carriageway throughout. Many parts of the route have dangerous bends.

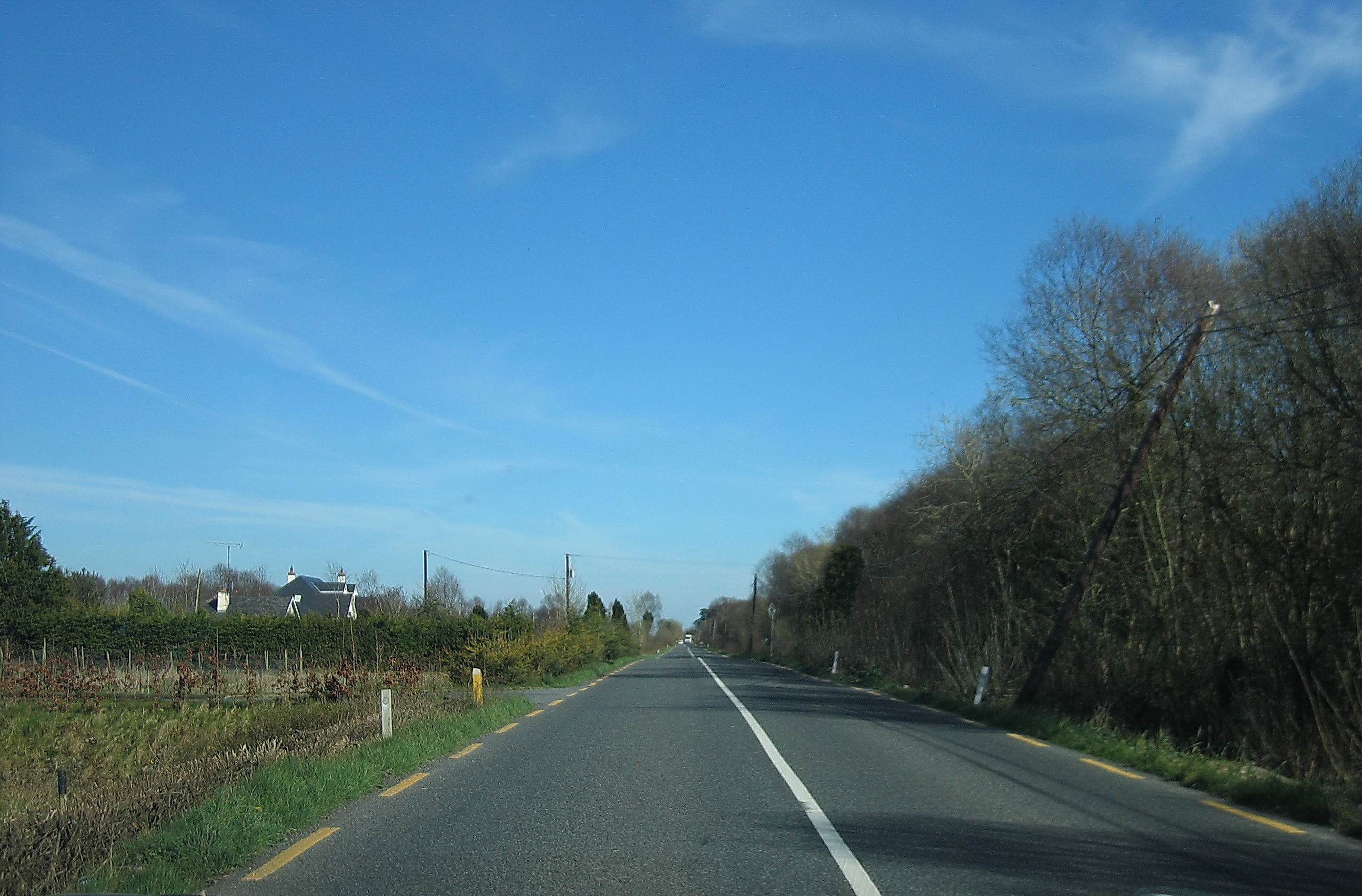
R156 near Killucan

== Route ==
From East to West, the R156 leaves the town of Dunboyne. The remainder of the route is through rural Meath and Westmeath, passing through the villages of Mullagh, Summerhill, Rathmolyon and Ballivor in Meath and Raharney and Killucan in Westmeath before connecting to the N4 at The Downs east of Mullingar. It joins the N4 at an at-grade junction with a busy dual-carriageway.

== See also ==
- Roads in Ireland
- National primary road
- National secondary road
