= Kilnaleck =

Village in County Cavan, Ireland

Kilnaleck Cill na Leice
- Village
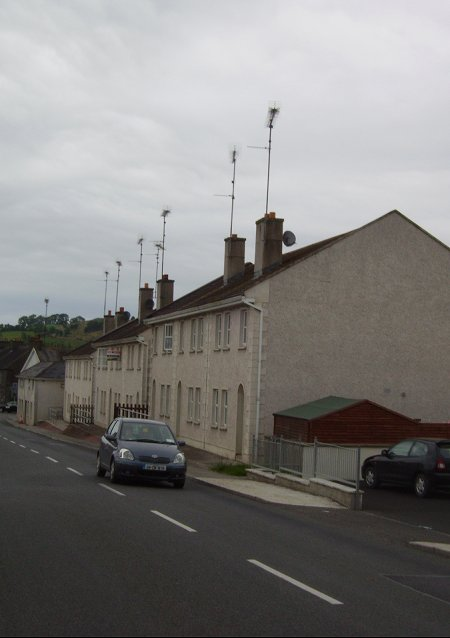
- The R154 regional road passes through Kilnaleck

- Location within Ireland
- Coordinates: 53°52′N 7°19′W
- Country: Ireland
- County: County Cavan
- Province: Ulster

Population (2022)
  - Total: 481

Kilnaleck (Irish: Cill na Leice, meaning 'church of the flagstone') is a village in County Cavan, Ireland on the R154 regional road. Kilnaleck was once the centre of a mining boom when, in 1879, some local businessmen and a school headmaster decided to develop the coal that existed nearby. However, the coal was very deep and hard to extract and the mine was forced to close. The village is within the civil parish of Crosserlough.

== Transport ==
In December 2023, Kilnaleck gained a regular several times daily (including Sundays) bus service. Route C2 operated by Local Link connects Kilnaleck with Ballinagh and Cavan. Over the decades Kilnaleck was served by CIÉ and from 1987 by Bus Éireann. However, in 2009 the remaining service, Bus Éireann route 179, was discontinued. Nowadays the nearest Bus Éireann routes may be accessed at Mountnugent (route 187) or Ballinagh (route 111A & 466), 7 km and 10 km distant respectively.

== Amenities ==
There is a national school in the village. There is also a children's playground, Roman Catholic church and Garda station.

== Sport ==
Kilnaleck is home to Crosserlough GFC, and Innyvale Athletic Club is based out of the GAA grounds in Kilnaleck.

There are equestrian facilities in the village.

== See also ==
- List of towns and villages in the Republic of Ireland
