= R160 road (Ireland) =

Road in eastern Ireland

Coordinates: 53.483711°N 6.892778°W

R160 road
- Bóthar R160
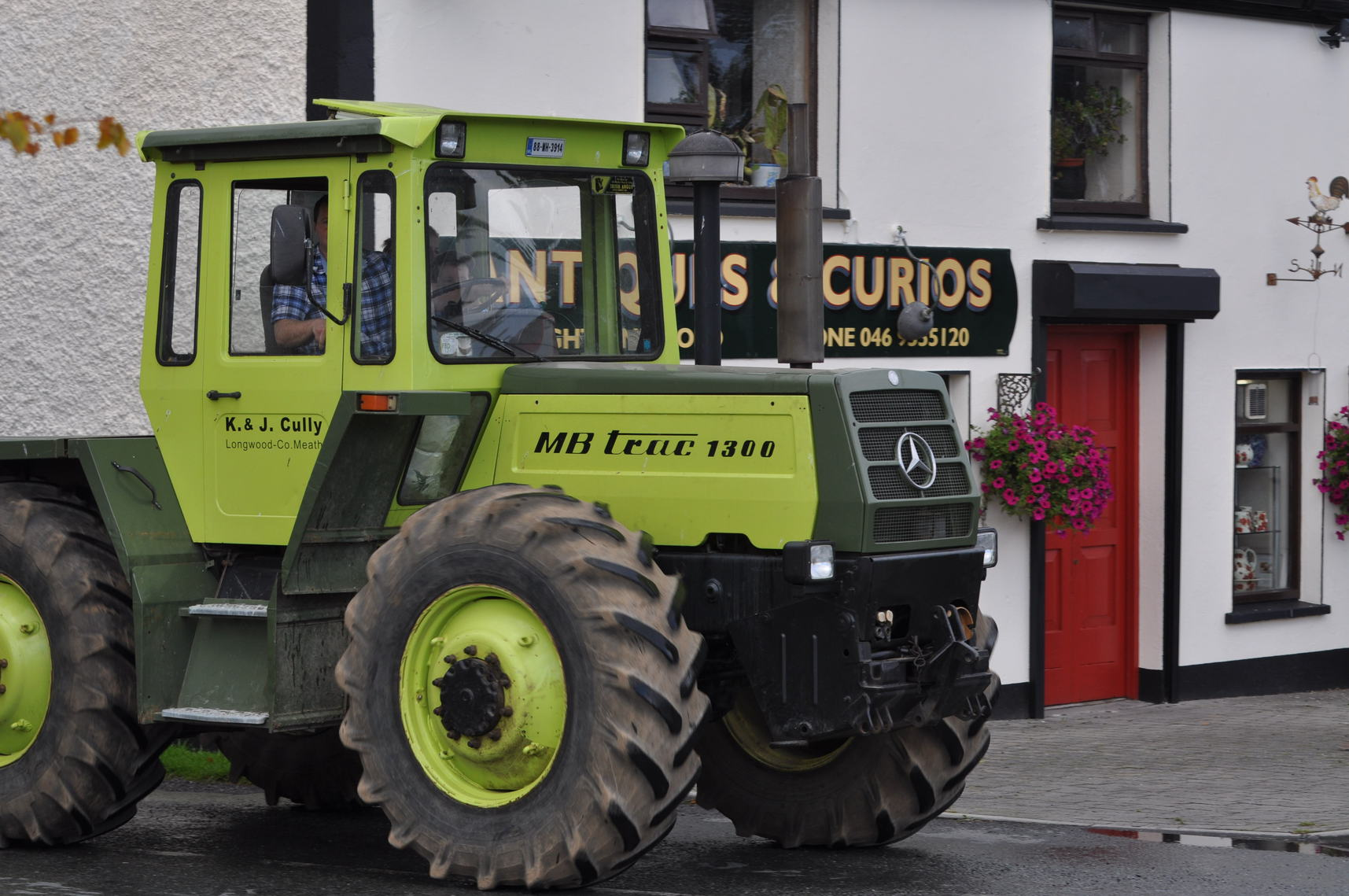
- Tractor on the R160

Route information
- Length: 20.4 km (12.7 mi)

Major junctions
- From: R154 / R933 Trim
- R158 Trim (Summerhill Road); R156 Brannockstown; Crosses Leinster Blackwater; Passes through Longwood; Crosses Royal Canal and Western Commuter railway line; enters County Kildare
- To: R148 Ballynadrumny

Location
- Country: Ireland

Highway system
- Roads in Ireland; Motorways; Primary; Secondary; Regional

The R160 road is a regional road in Ireland, located in County Meath and County Kildare.
