= Jim Connell =

Irish political activist (1852–1929)

Jim Connell (27 March 1852 – 8 February 1929) was an Irish political activist of the late 19th century and early 20th century, best known as the writer of the anthem "The Red Flag" in December 1889.

== Life ==
Connell was born in the townland of Rathniska near Kilskyre, to the north of Kells, County Meath and as a teenager became involved in land agitation and joined the Irish Republican Brotherhood. Aged 18 and a signatory to the Fenian Oath, he moved to Dublin where he worked as a docker until he became blacklisted for attempting to unionise the workers.

In 1875, he moved to London. He held a variety of jobs, including time as a staff journalist on Keir Hardie's newspaper The Labour Leader, and was secretary of the Workingmen's Legal Aid Society during the last 20 years of his life.

For 10 years he was a member of the Social Democratic Federation (SDF) led by Henry Hyndman, which supported the cause of Irish land reform and self-determination; both Connell and Hyndman were on the executive of the National Land League of Great Britain, which aimed to promote the need for land reform in Ireland amongst the workers in England. In the late 1890s, Connell left the SDF and joined the Independent Labour Party.

He also wrote for the SDF's newspaper Justice.

Although Lenin criticised the Independent Labour Party as "purely Menshevik and completely opportunist", he awarded Connell the Red Star Medal in 1922.

== "The Red Flag" and other songs ==
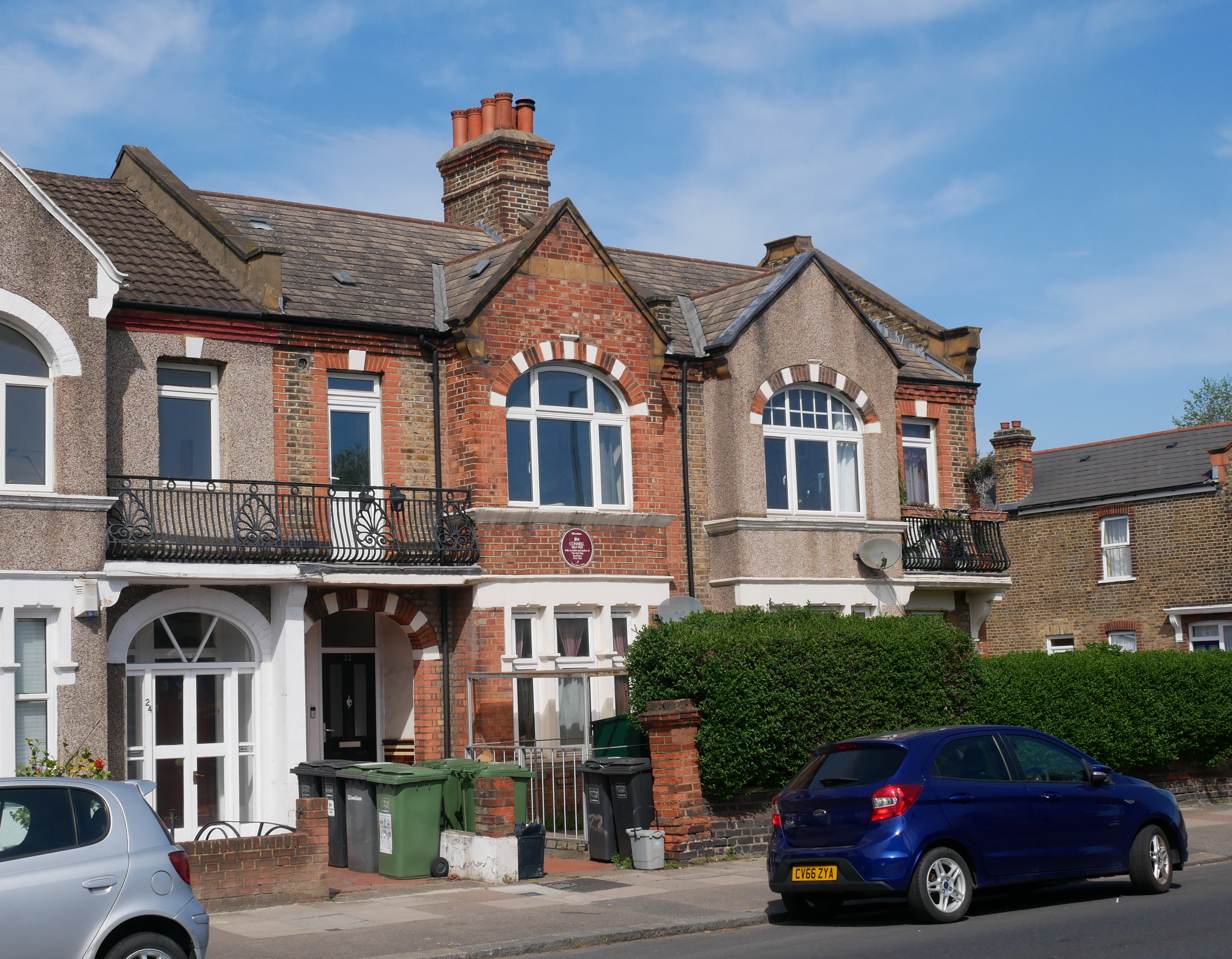
Connell's London home at 22a Stondon Park in Honor Oak, marked by a red plaque

The Red Flag was not his only work. An early song of his was 'Workers of England', which Connell set to the tune of O'Donnell Abú.

Workers of England why crouch ye like cravens?

Why clutch an existence of insult and want? Why stand to be plucked by an army of ravens,

Or hoodwinked forever by twaddle and cant?”

Connell was inspired to write a socialist anthem after attending a lecture at a meeting of the SDF during the London Dock Strike of 1889. He set down the words while on a train journey from Charing Cross railway station to his home in Honor Oak, south London. It is generally accepted that he gained inspiration as he watched the train guard raise and lower the red signal flag on the platform. It is normally sung to the tune of "Lauriger Horatius" (better known as the German-language carol "O Tannenbaum", which was also used for the former state song of Maryland) though Connell had wanted it sung to "The White Cockade", an old Scottish Jacobite song. Connell disapproved of the new rendition, calling it "church music... composed to remind people of their sins and frighten them into repentance." Connell's favourite part of the song was "It well recalls the triumphs past/It gives the hope of peace at last/The banner bright, the symbol plain/Of human right and human gain", which he saw as expressing the goal of the socialist movement. Both the original and newer versions of the song have been performed.

In 1920 in How I Wrote "The Red Flag" he commented:

Did I think that the song would live? Yes, the last line shows I did: "This song shall be our parting hymn". I hesitated a considerable time over this last line.

I asked myself whether I was not assuming too much. I reflected, however, that in writing the song I gave expression to not only my own best thoughts and feelings, but the best thoughts and feelings of every genuine socialist I knew... I decided that the last line should stand.

== Memorials ==
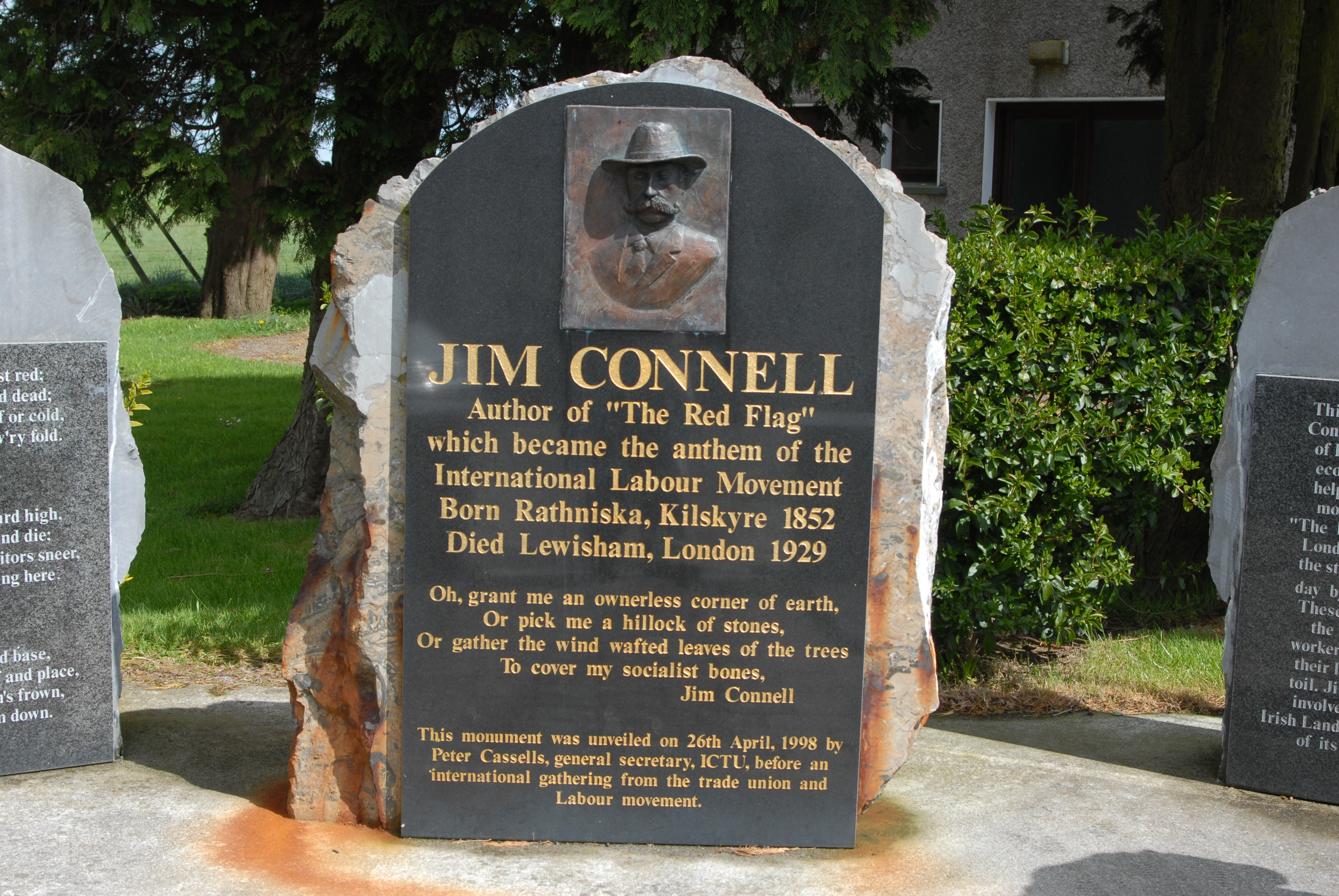
memorial at Crossakiel

Connell died in south London on 8 February 1929, and his funeral was held in Golders Green. He is commemorated by a plaque at 22a Stondon Park, SE23 in Crofton Park/Honor Oak, southeast London.

In 1997, a local committee was formed to erect a memorial, and on 26 April 1998 a monument to him was unveiled in Crossakiel, County Meath, Ireland, where he had addressed a crowd of 600 in 1918. Since 1998 there has been an annual memorial parade on May Day (1 May), in Crossakiel, near Kilskyre. The parade attracts many Irish and British trade unionists. In 2011, a Jim Connell School of Political Discussion was also held in the town of Kells.

== General references ==
- Brief biography
- Review of pamphlet The Irish Socialist Who Gave the World The Red Flag
