= Dangan Castle =

Former stately home in County Meath, Ireland

- Caisleán an Daingin
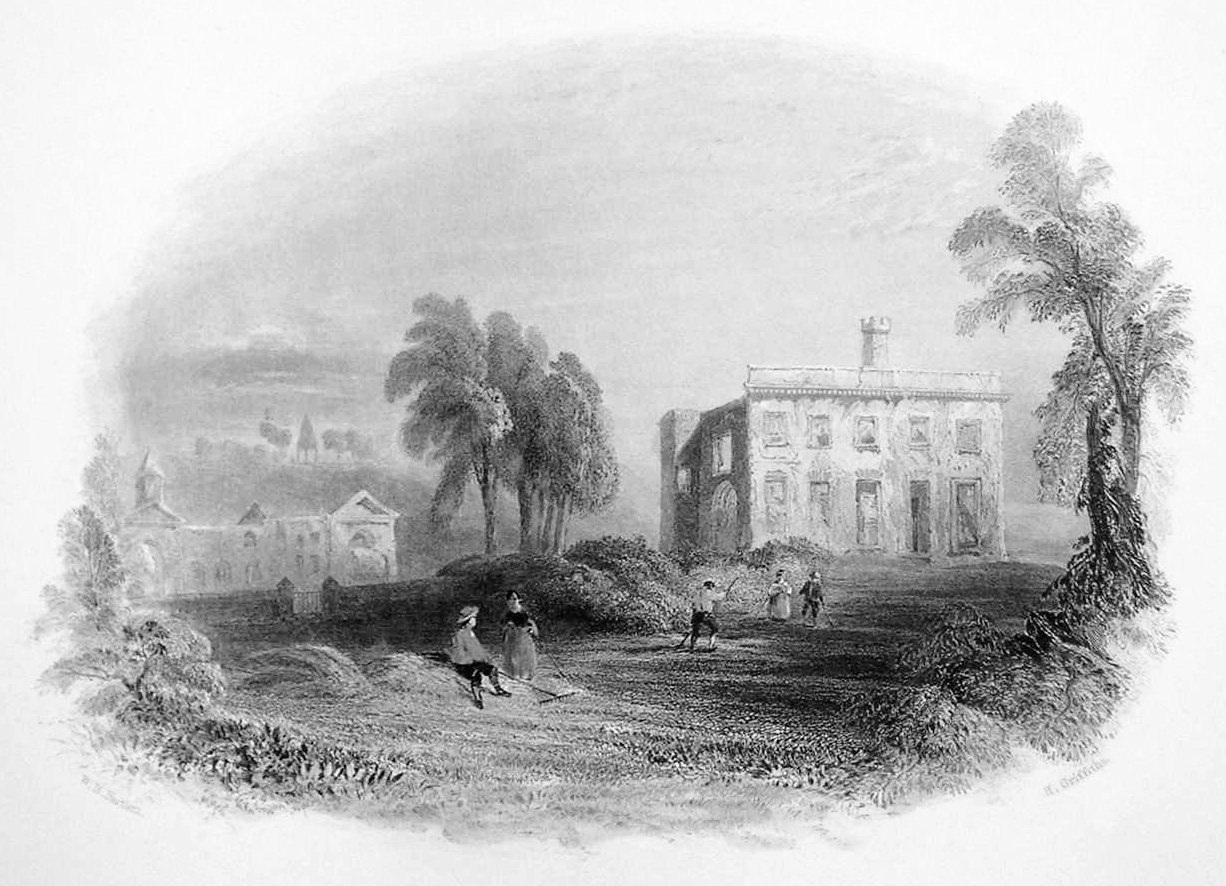
- Dangan Castle, c. 1840.
- Interactive map of the Dangan Castle area
- Former names: Dangan House

General information
- Status: Ruins
- Location: Summerhill, County Meath, Ireland
- Coordinates: 53.5052°N 6.7531°W

Dangan Castle is a former stately home in County Meath, Ireland, which is now in a state of ruin. It is situated by Dangan Church on the Trim Road. The castle is the former seat of the Wesley (Wellesley) family and is located outside the village of Summerhill. It was the childhood home of Field Marshal The 1st Duke of Wellington.

== Wellesleys ==
The Wesley (later spelled and pronounced Wellesley) family had occupied the land since the conquests of Henry II of England. The medieval castle, which was once their seat, now exists only as a ruined tower. The modern house was originally built in the early 1700s as Dangan House by Richard Colley, who demolished the old castle. Colley had inherited the estate from the childless Gerald Wesley, on condition that he changed his surname. He became the Right Honourable Richard Wesley, 1st Baron Mornington, and spent a considerable sum of money improving and maintaining the gardens of 600 Irish acres. These included a lake covering 26 acres, with a fort, several islands, and several ships. These were described in detail by Mary Delany.

Richard was succeeded by his son Garret Wesley, 1st Earl of Mornington. Garret's son Arthur Wellesley, the future Duke of Wellington, spent most of his childhood at the castle and gardens. The property passed out of the hands of the Wellesley family after Arthur's older brother Richard Wellesley, 1st Marquess Wellesley inherited it in 1781. He sold it to Thomas Burrowes of the East India Company.

== Later history ==
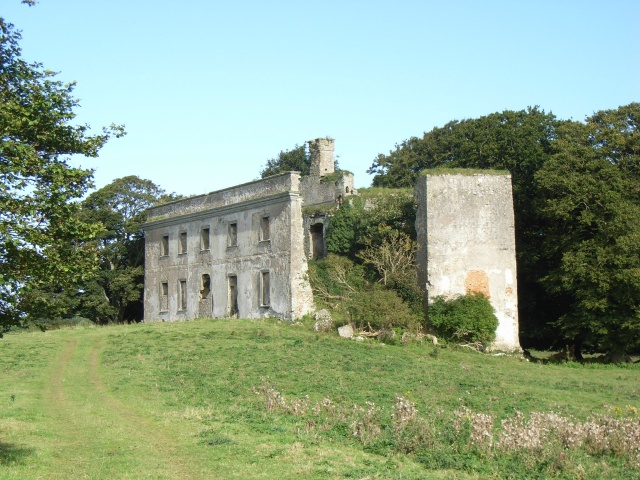
Dangan Castle in ruins

The castle was occupied in the early years of the 19th century by Roger O'Connor, who acquired it from Burrowes on a permanently renewable lease. O'Connor, a passionate Irish nationalist, asserted that he had acquired it as "a suitable residence in which to entertain Napoleon" after the defeat of Britain. In 1809, during O'Connor's occupation, there was a serious fire that destroyed much of the building. Insurance fraud was suspected, but O'Connor's son Francisco Burdett O'Connor wrote in his autobiography 60 years later that he had accidentally started the fire himself when melting lead to create bullets.

In 1817 O'Connor was accused of having plotted with his estate manager and labourers to rob a mail coach, during which a guard was shot and killed. He was acquitted after a sensational trial, but left the building soon afterwards. The already seriously damaged castle and grounds rapidly fell into a state of irretrievable disrepair after O'Connor's departure. By 1841, The Irish Penny Journal noted that "nothing but the outer walls remain, and the interior space, once formed into ample halls and chambers, has been converted into a flower garden". It added that in the recent past it had been "a place of concealment for plunder and a resort of thieves".

In September 2013 Dangan Castle and its surroundings were put up for sale.
