= Summerhill, County Meath =

Village in County Meath, Ireland

Summerhill Cnoc an Línsigh (Irish)
- Village
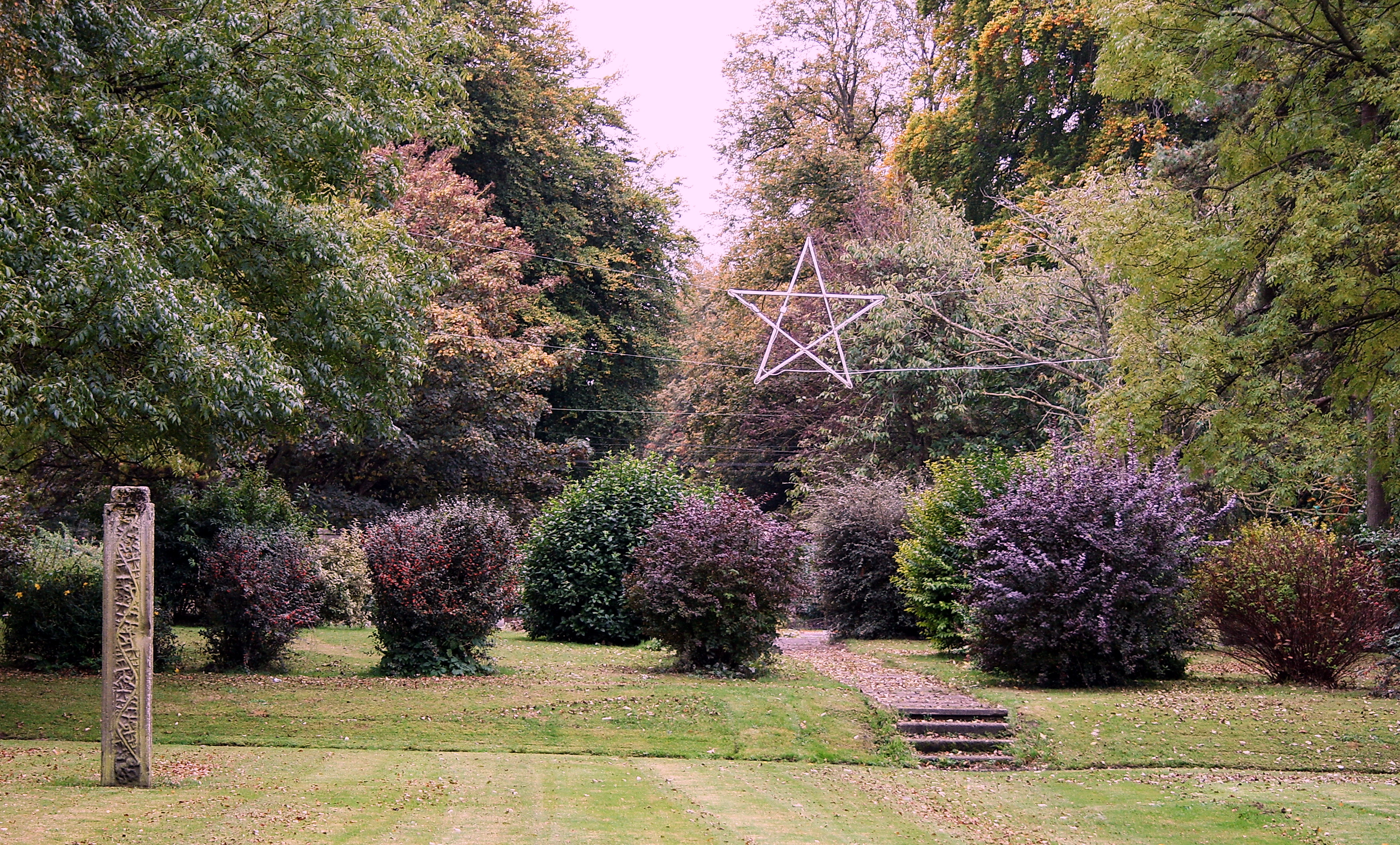
- The village green

- Location in Ireland
- Coordinates: 53°28′55″N 6°43′51″W
- Country: Ireland
- Province: Leinster
- County: County Meath
- Dáil Éireann: Meath West

Population (2016)
  - Total: 878
- Time zone: UTC+0 (WET)
  - Summer (DST): UTC-1 (IST (WEST))

Summerhill (Irish: Cnoc an Línsigh) is a heritage village in County Meath, Ireland. It is located in the south of the county, between Trim and Kilcock on the R158 and west of Dunboyne on the R156.

It is the site of one of the most important battles in 17th century Ireland, the Battle of Dungan's Hill. Up until 1667, the village was known in English as 'The Knock' or 'Lynchs' Knock' (phonetic renderings of Cnoc an Línsigh) as it was the ancestral home of the Norman-Irish Lynch family, whence came the Galway merchant family of the same name - one of the "Tribes of Galway". However, in about 1667, it was renamed Summerhill by the Langfords, the landed gentry, builders of Summerhill House and planners of the village as it is today.

The ruins of the large Lynch castle can be seen in the village today while, apart from the village layout, only the demesne walls and entrance pillars of Summerhill House still stand.

== Summerhill House and Demesne ==
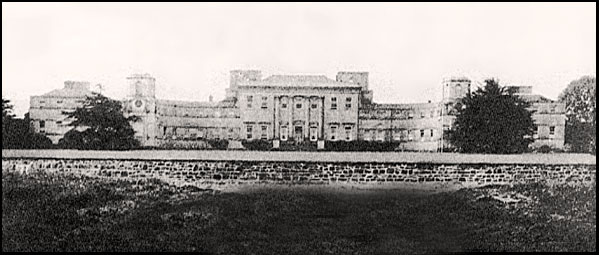
Summerhill House, Main Front

The ancient seat of the Norman-Irish Lynch family had been granted to Bishop Henry Jones for his services provided as Scoutmaster General to Cromwell's Army. Henry Jones, Church of Ireland Lord Bishop of Meath in 1661, sold Summerhill and many other townlands to Sir Hercules Langford.

Lynch's Castle, located on the Sumerhill Demesne, was then occupied by the Langfords until it was abandoned in the 1730s when Summerhill House was built for Hercules Langford Rowley, the father of Hercules Rowley, 2nd Viscount Langford. The old Lynch's Castle remained on the demesne as a folly.

The house is accredited to architects Edward Lovett Pearce and Richard Cassels, although John Vanbrugh is supposed to have had a great influence on the house, which can be seen in the great chimney stacks.

The house was damaged by fire on a number of occasions and then on 4 February 1921, it was set on fire by the Irish Republican Army and completely destroyed, after being looted. The IRA had heard a rumour it was going to occupied by the Auxiliaries.

In 1957, the cut granite and stone from the house was sold off, and the ruin was fully destroyed in 1970.

=== Empress of Austria ===
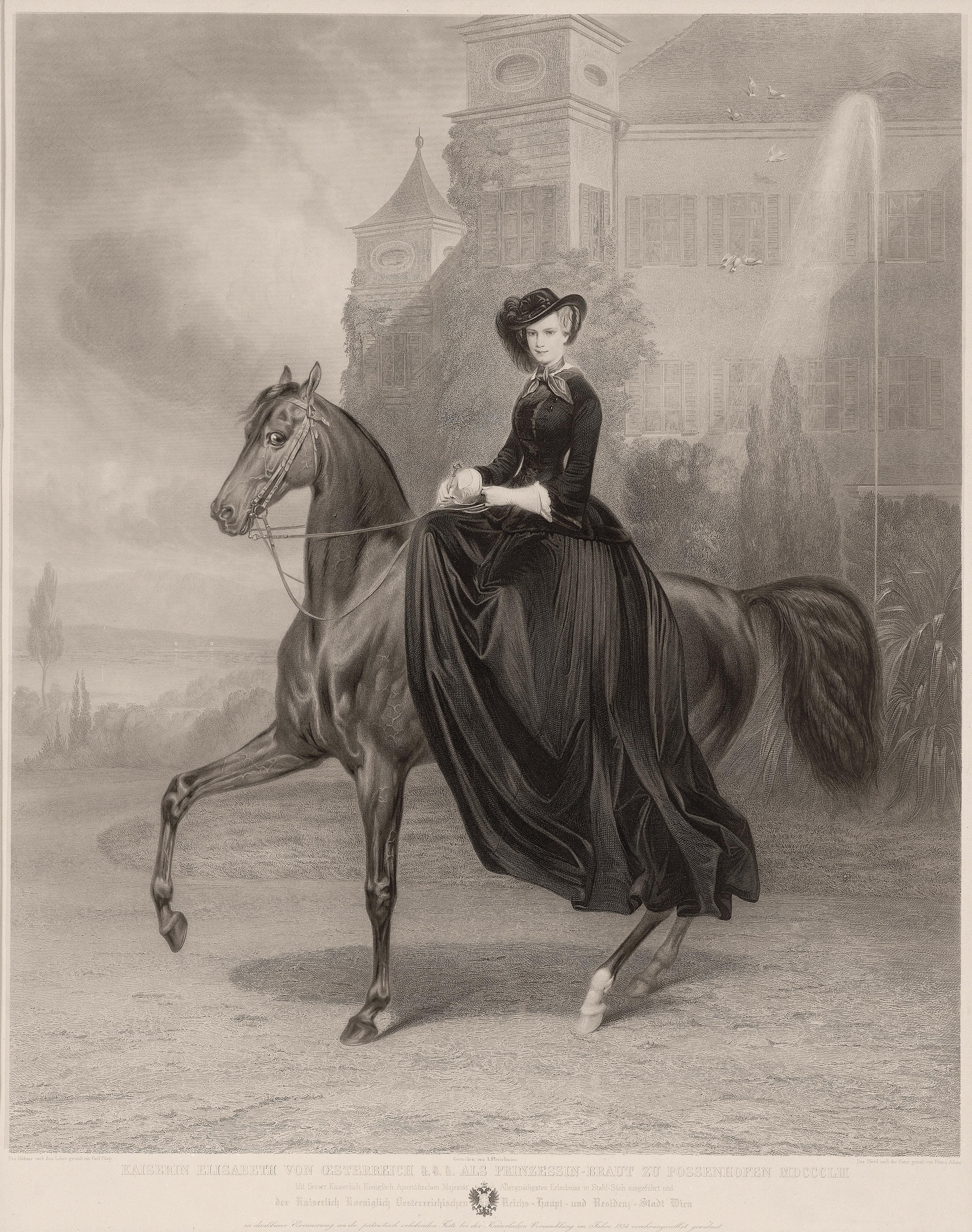
Equestrian portrait of Elisabeth at Possenhofen Castle, 1853

The Empress Elisabeth of Austria visited Summerhill House in February 1879 as Empress of Austria and Queen of Hungary. While based at Summerhill, she participated in a hunt which passed through the lands of Maynooth College. While crossing a wall of the college, Elisabeth reportedly nearly jumped on the vice-president of the college, William Walsh, who later became Primate of Ireland.

In November 2010, a riding whip was sold at a country house auction in Slane Castle. The whip had been owned by Elisabeth of Austria and given to Robert Fowler of nearby Rahinston House who was the Master of the Meath Hounds at the time of her stay in Summerhill. The whip had been found, not long before the auction, in a mahogany presentation case with a silver crest plate bearing the imperial arms of Habsburg. It sold for approximately €37,000.

== Dangan Castle ==
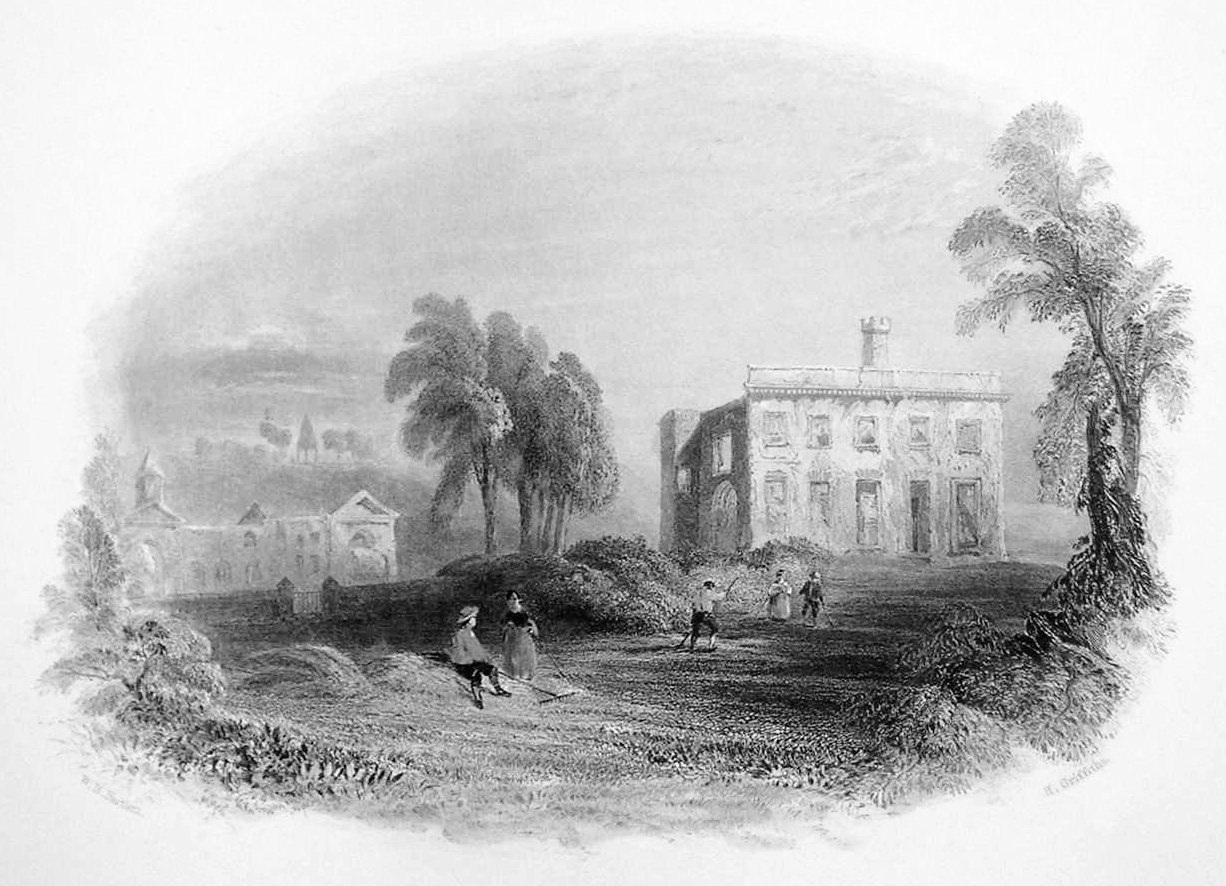
Dangan House

Between Trim and the area of Summerhill stand the ruins of Dangan Castle, which was the childhood home of Arthur Wellesley, 1st Duke of Wellington.

The remains of the old castle consisted of the outer walls of the keep, to which a later mansion, built in the Italian style, has been subsequently added to the front of the castle structure. The demesne and castle were sold by Richard Wellesley, 1st Marquess Wellesley to a Colonel Burrows, and by him let to Roger O'Connor. In 1809, while in the possession of O'Connor, a significant part of the house was destroyed by fire. This was suspected to have been insurance fraud, as a new policy for £5000 had recently been taken out. The O' Connor family left the home in 1817, shortly after which the damaged castle and grounds became a ruin.

== Education ==
There are two primary schools in the parish. They are Coole National School and Dangan National School, both operate under the patronage of the Roman Catholic parish priest and education is through English. For Irish medium education or other ethos options at primary level, pupils travel to neighbouring towns, Scoil Uí Riada is the Gaelscoil in Kilcock, while Gaelscoil na Bóinne is situated in Trim. Educate Together National School is also located in Trim as well as St. Patrick's National School, with a Church of Ireland ethos.

For second-level education, local students normally travel to Boyne Community School, Scoil Mhuire in Trim, or Scoil Dara in Kilcock. There are also secondary schools in the neighbouring towns of Enfield, Dunboyne, Maynooth, and Longwood. Coláiste Pobail Ráth Chairn provides second-level education through Irish in the nearby Gaeltacht of Ráth Chairn.

=== Coole National School ===
Coole National School originated in a house in 1824. In 1854 a Father Colgan applied to have the school at Garadice taken under the Board. He stated that it was his intention to build a more commodious house, but he could not get a site. The landlords of the time refused to provide land for a school. In 1856, Fr Colgan built a school in the chapel yard as Mr. Pratt Winter, the landlord, would not provide any land for it. The school was a two roomed slated building. It served the children of the parish for over 100 years. It became a mixed gender school in 1885.

In 1956 the Board of Works built a three roomed school, with a third of the bill paid by the parishioners. It was officially opened by a Father Michael Moore P.P. of Summerhill. The school got an extension in 2007 of 3 new rooms, a sports hall and the renovation of the older building, with most of the bill paid by parishioners with fundraising. The extension was opened by the Minister for Transport, Noel Dempsey, T.D. and was blessed by a Father Gavin P.P. of Summerhill. As of 2018, the enrollment figure was just 139 pupils.

== Sport ==
=== Gaelic football ===
A Gaelic football team was formed in Summerhill in 1905 but, by 1914, this team had disbanded. The current club, Summerhill GFC, was formed in 1931 and won the Meath Junior Football Championship the same year. In 1972, the club rose to Senior ranks for the first time. Summerhill went on to win the Senior title four times in a row from 1974 to 1977 and becoming the first Meath team to capture the Leinster Senior Club Football Championship in 1977. Summerhill GFC have won several Meath Senior Football Championships, including in 2013.

=== Soccer ===
Summerhill is also the home of the soccer club Park Celtic Summerhill, which was founded in 2009 when local clubs Agher Park and Summerhill Celtic amalgamated to create one club for the area. The club competes in the North East Football League at Adult Level, and in the NERL at underage level.

== Local attractions ==
Local history sites include Dangan Castle and Lynches Castle.

Agher Church is associated with Jonathan Swift who was rector there. The church, which is still in use today, is known for its east window made in Dublin by Thomas Jervais, it is the second earliest known piece of Irish-made stained glass. Larocor Church (of which Reverend Jonathan Swift was also Rector) has since been deconsecrated and is now a private house.

Summerhill Community Centre has a bowls room, a large indoor sports hall, 3 renovated sand-based tennis courts, an outdoor basketball court, a playground, an outdoor gym, a bar and restaurant, and a theatre, as well as office space.

Nearby sporting facilities include Summerhill Golf Course, Kilcock Golf Course, Summerhill Tennis Courts (at the Community Centre), and the grounds of Summerhill GFC.

The Clarkstown radio transmitter was a 248-metre-high mast around 3.5 km east of the village. It was demolished on 27 July 2023.

== Health ==
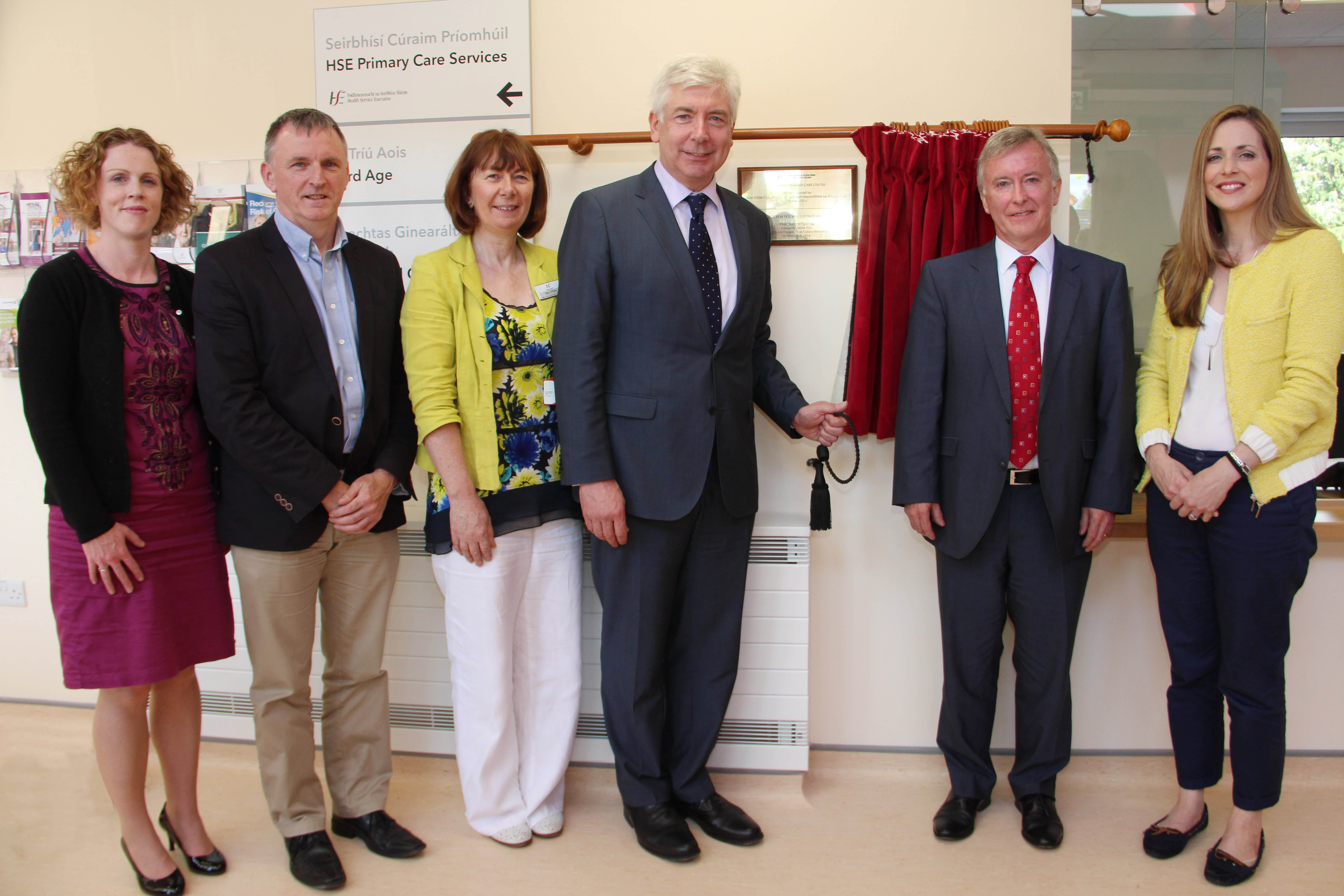
Alex White, Minister of State with responsibility for Primary Care, officially opens Summerhill Primary Care Centre in 2014

Summerhill Primary Care Center was opened by The Minister of State with responsibility for Primary Care Alex White TD on Thursday 5 June 2014. It accommodates a medical and health centre, including a doctors surgery and the local health nurses, as well as the National Third Age Centre.

== Religion ==
The majority of the parish is Roman Catholic according to the 2016 census. However, there is a rising number of people who say they have no religion.

=== Roman Catholic ===
Roman Catholic churches serving the area include Church of the Assumption, Coole and Our Lady of Lourdes, Dangan. (The latter church was consecrated on Rosary Sunday, 4 October 1914).

=== Church of Ireland (Anglican) ===
Agher Church is in the Rathmolyon and Dunboyne Union of parishes and holds a very important stained-glass window made by Thomas Jervais. It is the second-earliest known Irish-made stained-glass window. The window was originally erected in the private chapel of Dangan Castle, the seat of the Wellesley family (whom the 1st Duke of Wellington is a member), which burnt down in the 1809. The window was presented to Agher by the O'Connor family, who were then occupying Dangan. Soon after the new Agher church was constructed, Samuel Winter of Agher Pallis erected a family burial vault in the churchyard. Agher church was re-built in 1902. The church's history goes back to 1407 when The Reverends N. Vale and W. Edwards were a part of the clergy. The poet, political writer, and clergyman Jonathan Swift (1667–1745) was also rector here.

== Public transport ==
Bus Éireann route 115C links Summerhill to Mullingar, and in the opposite direction to Dublin via connections available at Kilcock. Westbound services terminate at Mullingar railway station or Killucan, while eastbound services terminate in Kilcock. There are 4 services westbound and 4 eastbound Monday to Friday, 4 services westbound and 5 eastbound on Saturdays, and 3 services each way on Sundays and Public Holidays. These enhanced services started on 14 October 2018.

Local Link route 115C is a daily bus service from Ballivor to Kilcock via Summerhill in the morning with a connection to Dublin available from Bus Éireann in Kilcock, a return journey is available in the evening. Local Link provide a bus service called the MH 111 from Summerhill to Navan via Trim on Friday mornings with a return service in the afternoon. Local Link also provide various evening services including the MH 115C return service from Ballivor to Navan via Summerhill and Trim on Friday and Saturday evenings, MH 406 from Summerhill to Crumlin Bingo on Tuesday evenings, MH 407 from Summerhill to Allenwood Bingo on Wednesday evenings, and a local bus MH 408 to the Summerhill Bingo on Thursday evenings.

Streamline Coaches provide journeys to/from Maynooth University during term time.

== Notable people ==
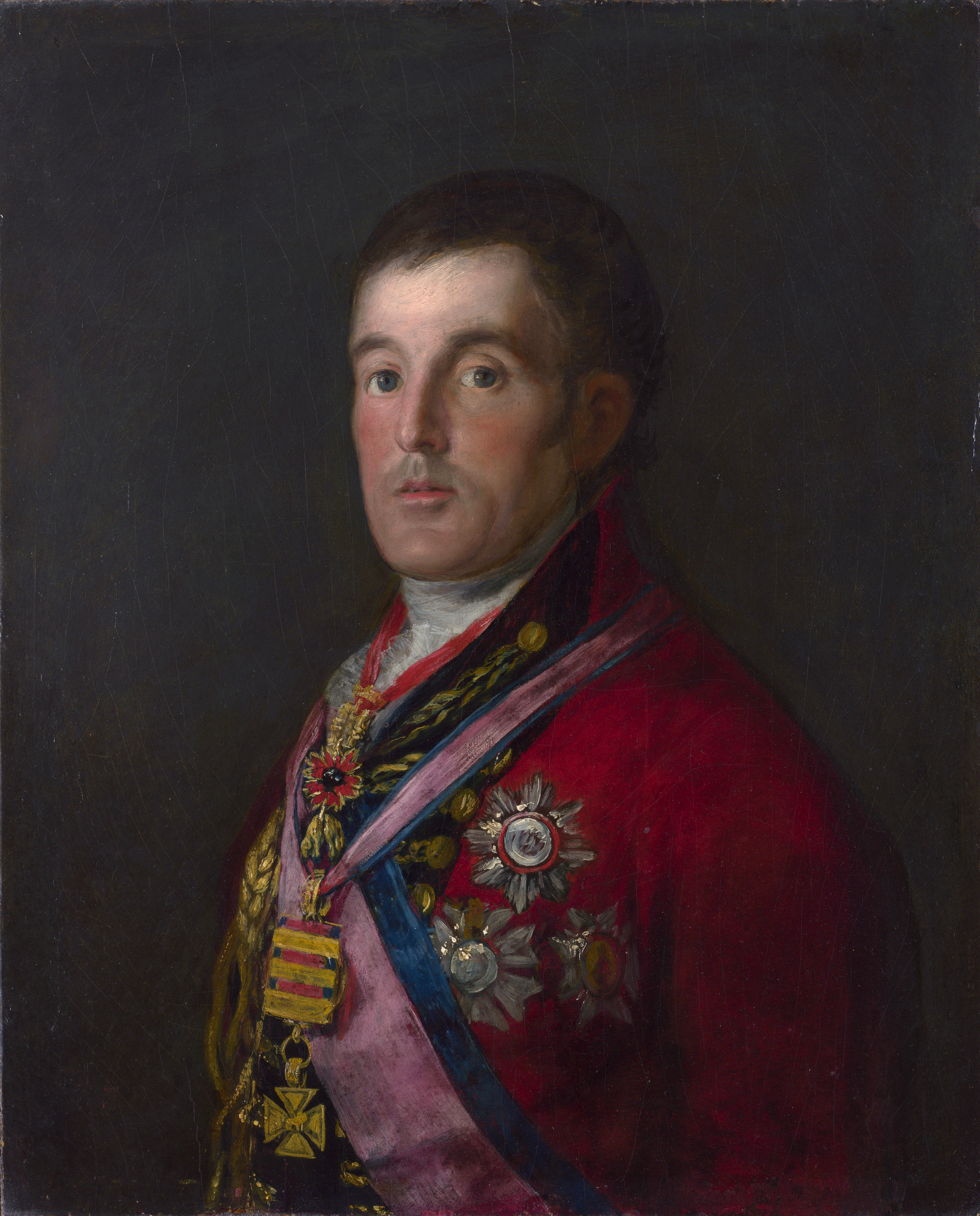
The Duke of Wellington reputedly stated, in reference to his birthplace, that "being born in a stable doesn't make one a horse". In fact, he never made such a comment.

- Gordon Elliott, horse trainer of several Cheltenham Gold Cup, Aintree Grand National and Irish Grand National winners.
- Mick Lyons, two time All-Ireland medal winner and Meath captain
- Roger O'Connor, Irish nationalist and writer who occupied Dangan after the Wellesley family left.
  - Feargus O'Connor, son of Roger and leading Chartist, brought up in Dangan
  - Francisco Burdett O'Connor, son of Roger who became a Bolivian general and politician, brought up in Dangan
- Ambrose O'Higgins, 1st Marquis of Osorno, Viceroy of Peru, grew up in Summerhill having moved there as an infant in 1721.

== See also ==
- List of towns and villages in Ireland
