= Mountnugent =

Village in County Cavan, Ireland

Mountnugent Droichead Uí Dhálaigh
- Village
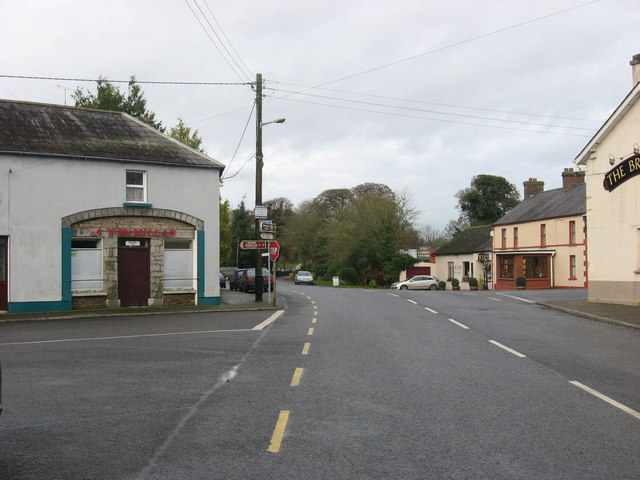
- The village is on the R154 road

- Location in Ireland
- Coordinates: 53°49′6″N 7°15′24″W
- Country: Ireland
- Province: Ulster
- County: Cavan
- Time zone: UTC+0 (WET)
  - Summer (DST): UTC-1 (IST (WEST))

Mountnugent, or Mount Nugent, historically known as Dalysbridge (Irish: Droichead Uí Dhálaigh), is a village and townland in southern County Cavan, Ireland. The village is on the R154 regional road, at a river crossing near Lough Sheelin.

== History ==
The village's more recent name of Mountnugent comes from a local branch of the Nugent family, originally an Anglo-Norman family who were cousins of Hugh de Lacy and large landowners in Meath, Cavan and Westmeath. Although the village is in County Cavan, the Roman Catholic parish of Mountnugent (or Kilbride) is in the Diocese of Meath. In the Church of Ireland, Mountnugent, or Kilbride Castlecor, is part of the parish of Castlepollard in the diocese of Meath and Kildare.

The village is in the Dáil constituency of Cavan–Monaghan and in the electoral division of Kilbride. For planning applications or land registration purposes, it is in the barony of Clanmahon.

While the river that the village is located on, with its mid-18th century bridge, is sometimes referred to as the Inny, most sources name a river 3 kilometres to the southwest forming the boundary of Meath and Cavan near Ross Castle as the River Inny, rising near Oldcastle, and the river that flows through the village as the Mountnugent Stream, rising near Ballyjamesduff.

During the launch of Ireland's new postcode system, Eircode, residents were surprised that Mountnugent was counted as part of County Meath, and that the Irish name was now a literal translation of the English name - "Sliabh an Nuinseannaigh".

== Facilities ==
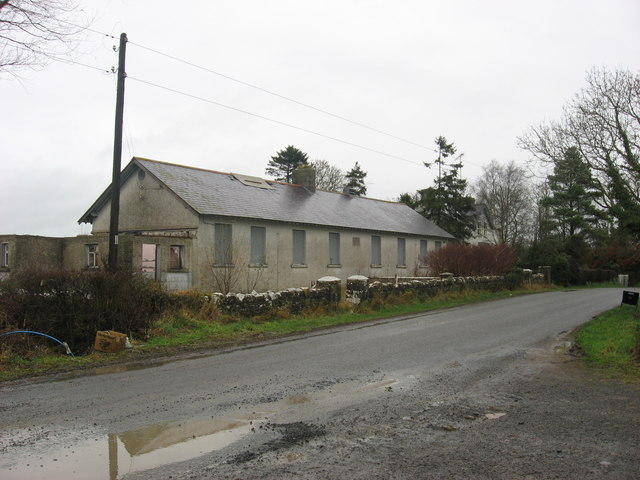
Former schoolhouse, closed in 1981

It has one public house (The Bridge Inn), one grocery shop (Smiths), one fuel station (Smiths), one vehicle repair shop (Smiths), two churches (Roman Catholic: St Bridget's, built c. 1820; Church of Ireland: St Bride's, built 1804) and one primary school. There is a hairdresser's. There is a hotel just outside the village on the shores of Lough Sheelin - Crover House Hotel. An equestrian centre is located three kilometres outside the village. The primary school (Scoil Bhríde) has about 120 children and the village population, including neighbouring townlands, is around 500.

== Sport ==
Fishing is prominent in the area. Lough Sheelin, a lake famous for its trout fishing, is just outside Mountnugent. Trout stocks began to decrease in the early 1970s as pollution from various sources including agriculture entered the lake. A marked resurgence of mayfly in recent years has been noted.

A notable change since the decline of the trout population has been the increase in the populations of pike and perch, and the subsequent increase in anglers specialising in these species. Mountnugent has a GAA club.

== Transport ==
Bus Éireann route 187 serves Mountnugent seven days a week. It provides transport to the neighbouring towns and villages of Oldcastle, Ballyjamesduff, Virginia and Kells. There are two journeys from Mountnugent and three journeys to it each weekday.

== See also ==
- List of towns and villages in Ireland
