= Ballyjamesduff =

Town in County Cavan, Ireland

Ballyjamesduff Baile Shéamais Dhuibh
- Town
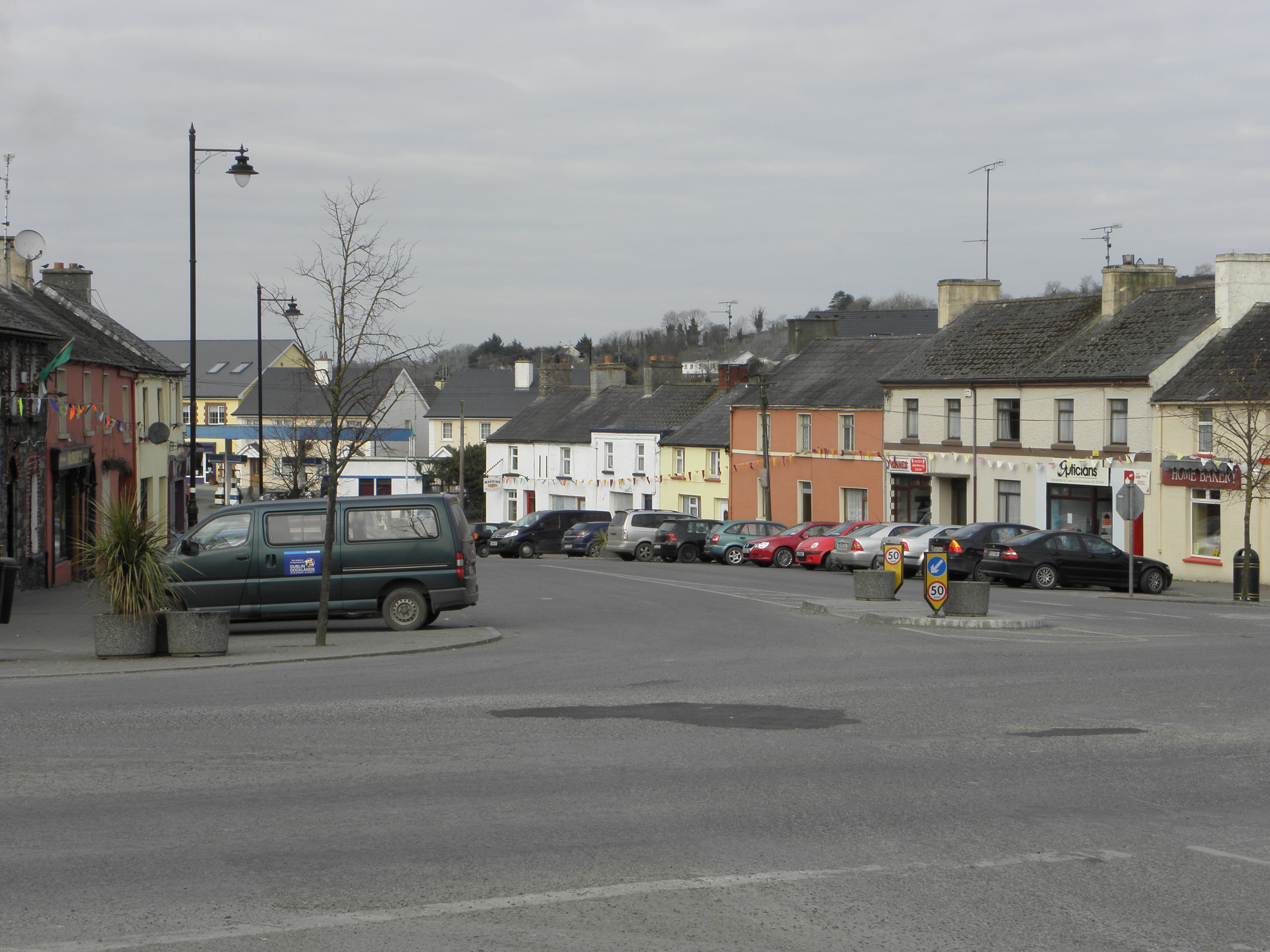
- Market Street

- Location in Ireland
- Coordinates: 53°51′51″N 7°12′20″W
- Country: Ireland
- Province: Ulster
- County: County Cavan
- Elevation: 104 m (341 ft)

Population (2022)
  - Total: 2,917
- Eircode routing key: A82
- Telephone area code: +353(0)49
- Irish Grid Reference: N520906

Ballyjamesduff (Irish: Baile Shéamais Dhuibh) is a town in County Cavan, Ireland. It is 17 km south-east of Cavan town.

== History ==
The first mention of Ballyjamesduff is found in The Registry of Deeds, Kings Inns, Henrietta Street, Dublin, Deed No.12-294-5122, drawn up on 12 May 1714.

In A Topographical Dictionary of Ireland, first published by Samuel Lewis in 1837, its entry reads:

"Ballyjamesduff, an old market town, in county Cavan, and the province of Ulster. The town is situated on the old mail-coach road from Virginia to Cavan.
The parish was created in 1831, by disuniting nine townlands from the parish of Castleraghan, five from that of Denn, two from Lurgan, and four from the parish of Kildrumferton."

The garrison at Ballyjamesduff barracks was attacked with rifle fire and grenades in July 1922. There were no casualties.

A former market town, Ballyjamesduff was the winner of the 1966 and 1967 Irish Tidy Towns Competition.

== Demographics ==
The population was 2,917 at the 2022 census. At that census, Ballyjamesduff had a similar population to the County Cavan towns of Bailieborough, Virginia and Kingscourt: each with about 3,000 people. The town's population is diverse, with about 35% born outside of Ireland.

== Transport ==
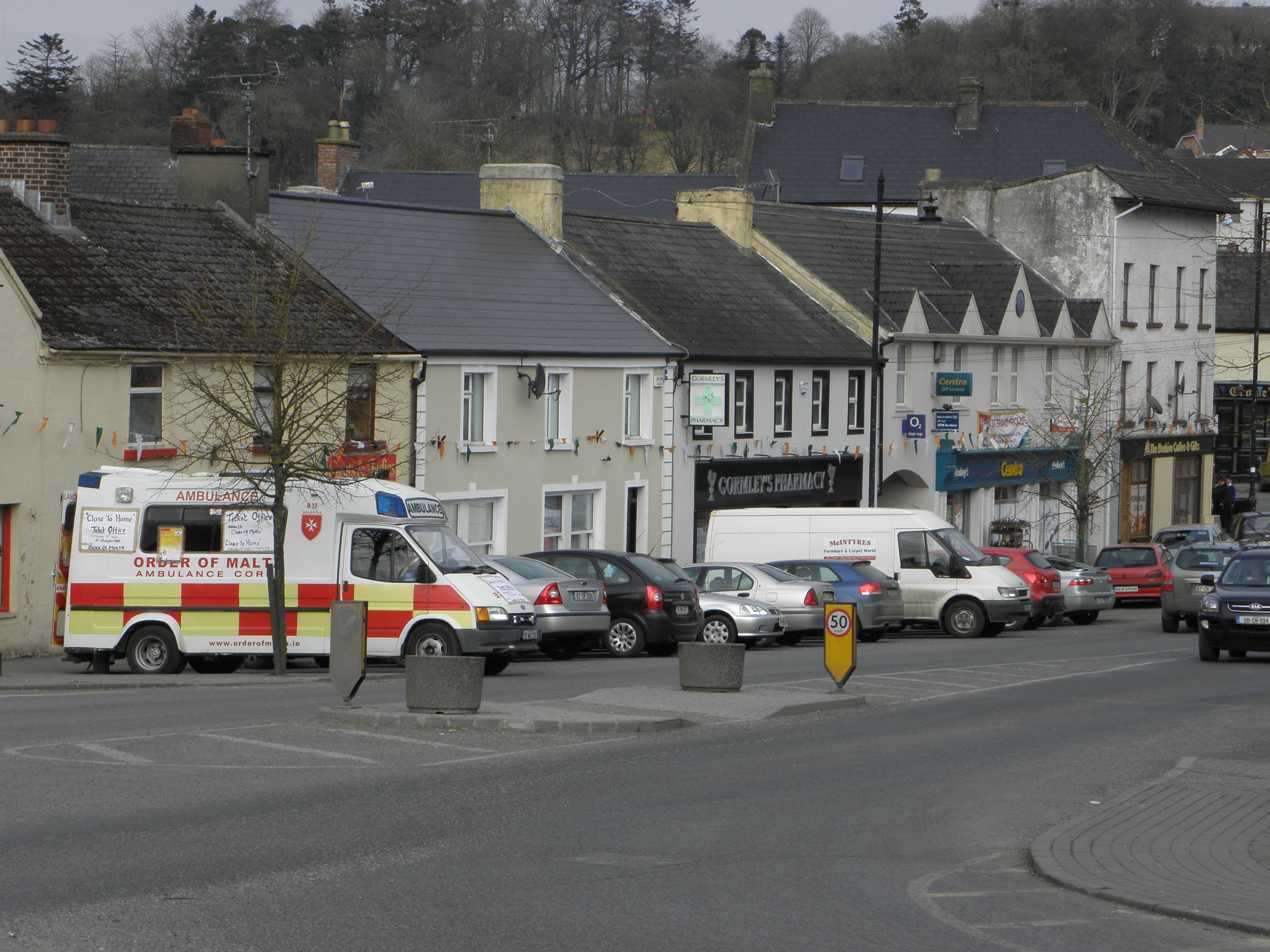
Anne Street

The town is located on the R194 and R196 regional roads. It is 17 kilometres (11 mi) south-east of Cavan town.

Bus Éireann route 187 provides daily services to Oldcastle, Mountnugent, Virginia, Crossakiel and Kells. Local Link route 186 was introduced in October 2024 and provides several daily services to Cavan, Crosskeys, Virginia, Mullagh, Moynalty, Kells and Gibbstown.

== Notable places ==
- Cavan County Museum, located in the former Convent of St Clare, collects, conserves and displays material representing the heritage and culture of County Cavan. In August 2014, Cavan County Museum opened Ireland's largest outdoor WWI replica trench.
- Ballyjamesduff was once noted for having the highest pub-to-person ratio in Ireland. There was approximately 1 pub for every 34 persons in the town.
- The Market House, built in 1815 to commemorate the military achievements at Waterloo of the Duke of Wellington, was designed by Arthur McClean a Cavan-born architect who also designed the Anglican church in Virginia, County Cavan. McClean left Ireland around 1825 and settled in Brockville, Ontario, Canada where he built a number of Anglican churches.
- St Joseph's Town Hall was built in 1959 and was opened officially in 1968 by showband act Big Tom and The Mainliners.
- Liffey Meats, a meat processing plant, which gained notoriety in 2013 when it was revealed the plant processed equine and porcine meat in beef burgers.

== Popular culture ==
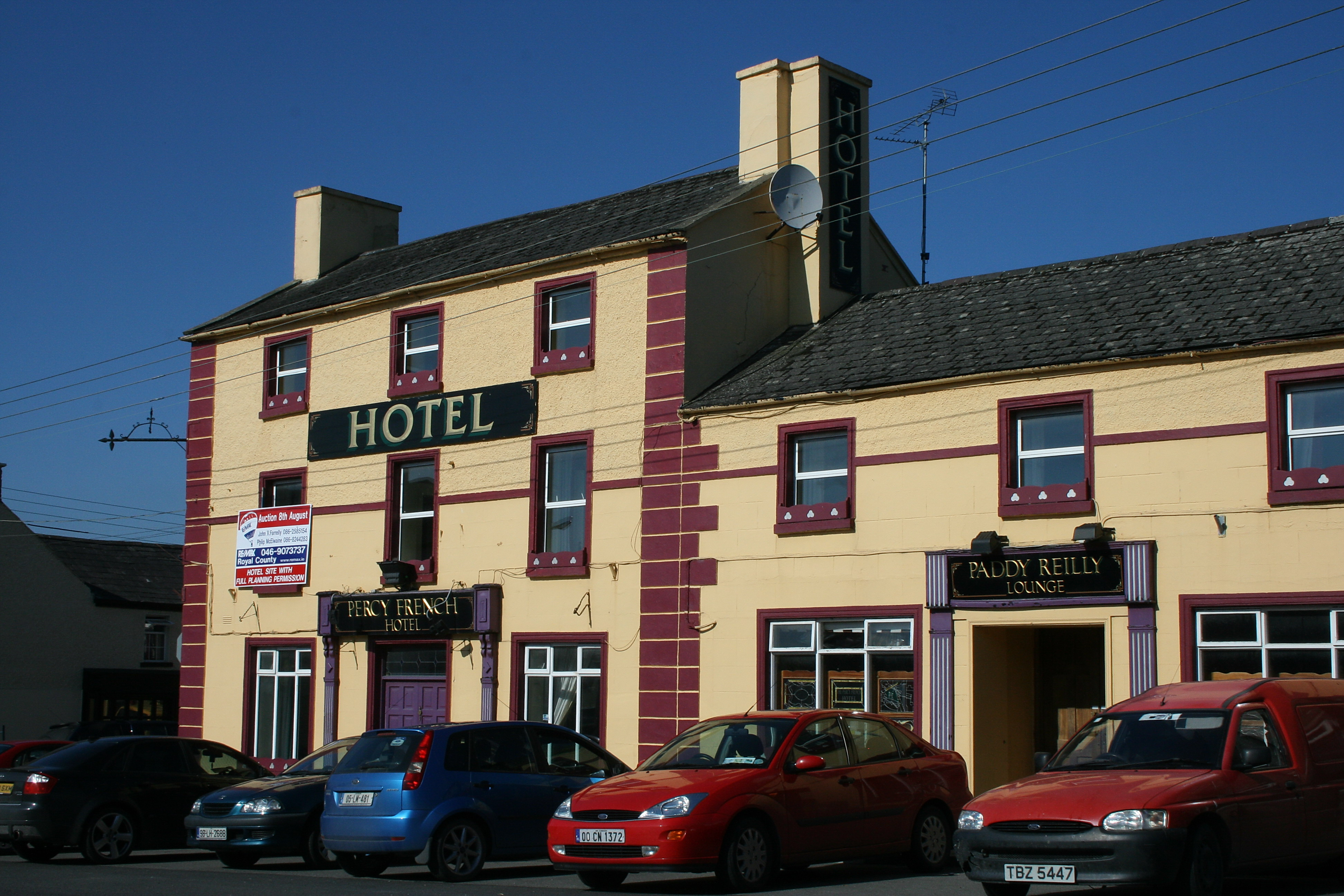
The Percy French Hotel and Paddy Reilly Bar

=== In song ===
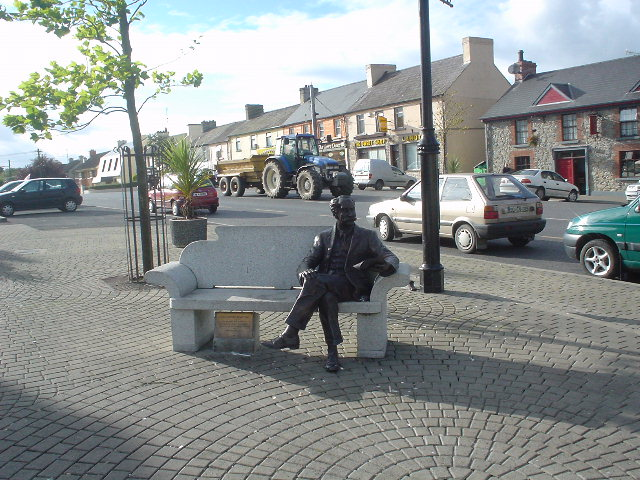
Bronze figure of Percy French in the town square with words and music of "Come back, Paddy Reilly, to Ballyjamesduff".

The town is referenced in the Percy French song "Come Back, Paddy Reilly, to Ballyjamesduff", about a man from the area who had been a chauffeur for French but subsequently emigrated.

=== Pork Festival ===
The Pork Festival was an annual town festival started in 1994. This was largely due to a nearby pork-rendering factory supplying a large amount of pork for use in the festival.

=== "The Frolics" ===
An annual music and comedy event, known as "The Frolics", has been held in Ballyjamesduff since the mid-20th century.

== People ==
- Percy French, poet, songwriter and former Board of Works Inspector of Drains with Cavan County Council.
- John Wesley, preacher, theologian and founder of the worldwide Methodist Church, preached in Ballyjamesduff and built a church here in the 18th century.
- Pete Briquette (born Patrick Cusack), bassist with the Boomtown Rats came from Ballyjamesduff.
- Marcus Daly, known as "the Montana Copper King", was born in 1841 near Ballyjamesduff.
- Ronan Lee, author, academic, and former Member of Parliament for Indooroopilly electorate, Queensland, Australia came from Ballyjamesduff.

== See also ==
- List of towns and villages in Ireland
- Market Houses in Ireland
