= Oldcastle, County Meath =

Town in County Meath, Ireland

Oldcastle Irish: An Seanchaisleán
- Town
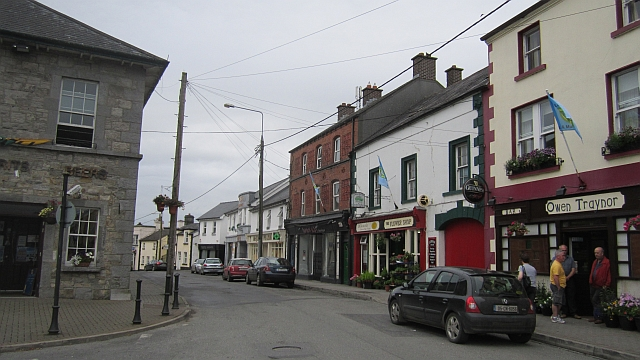
- Businesses on the Square in Oldcastle

- Location in Ireland
- Coordinates: 53°46′09″N 7°09′45″W
- Country: Ireland
- Province: Leinster
- County: County Meath
- Elevation: 200 ft (61 m)

Population (2022)
  - Total: 1,409
- Time zone: UTC+0 (WET)
  - Summer (DST): UTC-1 (IST (WEST))
- Irish Grid Reference: N550803

Oldcastle (Irish: An Seanchaisleán) is a town in County Meath, Ireland. It is in the northwest of the county, near the border with Cavan, 19 kilometres (12 mi) from Kells. The R154 and R195 roads cross in the town's market square. The town is in a townland and civil parish of the same name.

At the 2022 census the town's population was 1,409, a 71% increase from 1996 (when it was 826).

== History ==
The area was the birthplace of St Oliver Plunkett, the last Irish Catholic martyr to die in England.

Oldcastle is the 18th-century creation of the Naper family, who had received parts of the Plunkett estate following the Cromwellian wars. St. Oliver Plunkett, who served as Lord Archbishop of Armagh in the seventeenth century, and who was hanged, drawn and quartered at Tyburn in Middlesex (now in the Marble Arch area of the City of Westminster in London) in 1681 on false charges, was the most famous member of this family.

It was also the birthplace of Isaac Jackson, an early Quaker in Ireland, He moved to Ballitore, County Kildare, where he married and raised a large family, mostly all of whom emigrated with their parents to Chester County, Pennsylvania, USA in 1725.

Oldcastle suffered quite badly during the Great Famine and subsequent emigration. Owing to the continuation of a Gaelic way of life in the north of the county, Oldcastle suffered far more than the richer more arable land in the southern part of County Meath. The poorest class lived where Irish culture was strongest and were obliterated by starvation and emigration. Nonetheless, land patterns visible today still reveal a strong attachment to the pastoral farming of Gaelic culture. Politically and culturally the area has a strong tradition of support for radical republicanism, the Gaelic Athletic Association and Comhaltas Ceoltóirí Éireann; a local paper published in the town in the early 1900s gave its name to one of the Irish political parties, Sinn Féin.

Oldcastle Workhouse was located on St. Oliver Plunkett Street (formerly Lennox Street), part of the R195 (the main road to Castlepollard), on the southern edge of the town. Designed by George Wilkinson in a neo-Tudor style and probably built in the late 1830s or early 1840s, it was demolished before the 1950s. Mellow's Park was built by Meath County Council on the site around 1950. Many Germans, Austrians and Hungarians were interned in the old workhouse by the British Government during the First World War.

Fennor Upper and Lower in Oldcastle is said to be named after Queen Medb's daughter, Findabair (Fennor). In Irish Mythology, she was sent as an offering to Cú Chulainn in his fight against Medb and her army from Connacht. She was killed by Cú Chulainn and the area was named after the place where she was murdered and buried.

In 1923, Micheal Grealy, a member of the anti-treaty IRA, robbed two banks – The Hibernian Bank and the Northern Bank – for which he was executed in Mullingar Barracks.

A monument was erected in 1961 in Oldcastle Square by Meath Brigades Executive, Old IRA Federation, 1916–1921 to the memory of Commandant Seamus Coogan and Commandant Patrick McDonnell who were killed by British Crown Forces during the War of Independence. The monument in the form of a cross was unveiled by Seán Dowling, Chairman of the National Federation of the Old IRA.

In November 1997, Michael McKevitt and other IRA dissidents held a meeting in a farmhouse in Oldcastle, County Meath, and a new organisation styling itself Óglaigh na hÉireann was formed. The organisation attracted disaffected Provisional IRA members from the republican stronghold of South Armagh, as well as other areas including Dublin, Belfast, Limerick, Tipperary, County Louth, County Tyrone and County Monaghan.

=== Oldcastle detention camp (1916–1918) ===
All of Ireland was part of the United Kingdom of Great Britain and Ireland in 1914 when the First World War broke out. The Alien Restriction Act 1914 was passed on 5 August 1914. The Act introduced strict controls on freedom of movement of foreign nationals and introduced a system of registration with the police. The Act also contained powers to deport foreign nationals and to intern all Austrian and German males between the ages of 17 and 42 (i.e. men of military age). The Oldcastle detention camp was the only permanent civilian POW camp in Ireland, detaining so called “enemy aliens”. This was due to a fear that these men would betray Britain by returning home and joining the German Army or becoming spies in Britain. Not all German and Austrian nationals residing in Ireland were detained immediately. These individuals tended to be citizens who had influential contacts and whose good conduct was guaranteed by them. However, even these men were detained eventually.

After this Act was passed, the British War Office started looking for suitable buildings to convert into detention centres. As stated by John Smith, "disused workhouses were ideal. They had much of the infrastructure to hold hundreds of people: dormitories, kitchens, dining halls, water, washing facilities, an infirmary, store rooms, recreation yards etc". These also had the bonus of being easy to defend with their high walls and being on the outskirts of towns. Oldcastle Workhouse met these requirements perfectly.

In 1838, The Poor Law Act was passed which aimed to relieve the poor/destitute by providing basic food and accommodation. Oldcastle Workhouse was built and opened in 1842 to accommodate 600 people. By 1914 there were only 50 inmates living in the building. After the military approved the conversion of the workhouse into a detention centre, these remaining residents were moved to other workhouses in the area. In November 1914, the building was converted. The eight-foot perimeter walls were reinforced, ‘There are nine sentry boxes around the workhouse grounds, while several galvanized houses have been erected... The grounds are surrounded by barbed wire entanglements about 5 feet high and 14 feet wide.’ Quoted from The Anglo Celt, a newspaper in the area at the time of the camp.

On 12 December 1914, ‘The long expected German prisoners arrived this week in Oldcastle and took up quarters in the disused workhouse.’ This was a headline from the time, The Meath Chronicle on the day of the arrival. The Meath Chronicle reported that via a specially commissioned train 68 German inmates were transported into the town. From there, they were marched through the town under armed guards to their new residence. Two days later, another 26 civilians were moved into the camp. This continued steadily from late 1914 to 1915. 304 inmates were in the camp by February 1915 this number increased to 579 by June 1916. By this time, every space in the workhouse was being utilised by the camp commandant, Major Robert Johnson, including the workhouse's church sacristy. ‘Written accounts show that the highest recorded number of prisoners being held at the Oldcastle Detention Camp was 583 – the building appeared to be operating at full capacity.’ As taken from John Smith's article on the subject. Up to thirty men were housed in a room on regulation camp beds - that is, plank beds with sacks stuffed with straw serving as mattresses - one pillow and three blankets per man.

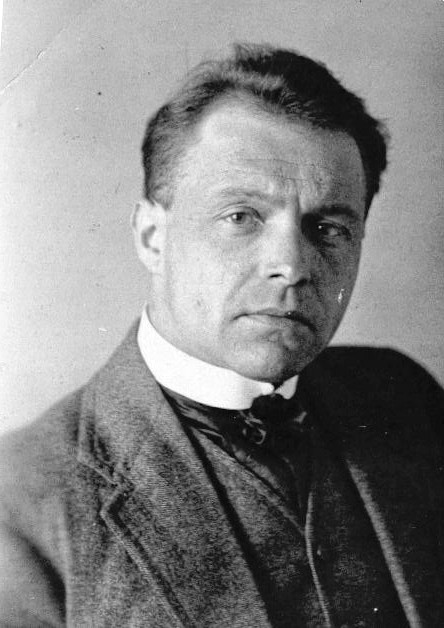
Aloys Fleischmann, cathedral organist and choirmaster in Cork, was interned in the camp.

The detainees were civilians from vastly different backgrounds. This ranged from clergymen, jewellery makers and musicians to cooks, butlers and butchers. Though the prison was not entirely pleasant, the inmates had some privileges, especially those who came from a better background. It was possible for the more affluent inmates to buy their own rooms and hire their own servants from among the less affluent detainees. The British wanted to divide the classes as they believed it was not acceptable to put a docker with a doctor. As part of camp life they were allowed to write and send two letters a week containing twenty-four lines. Parcels could be received and visitors were allowed for 15 minutes twice a month. One inmate, Aloys Fleischmann, a Bavarian church musician and composer, wrote to his wife and requested “three blankets and a pillow, a warm knitted Jacket, waterproof boots, a wash bowl, a kettle and mug, cutlery, tobacco and books.” This quote was taken from John Smith's research article. We can gather from this that conditions in the camp were cold, damp and basic. Although it is also reported that if they could gather 100 prisoners they would go on a four-mile march for exercise ending up in a pub in Dromone. They were even allowed to go in and buy a drink. Aloys Fleischmann kept a diary while in the camp.

A journalist visited the camp in June 1915, and he stated that he was “met by a large body of men” and described them as “fine strapping men”’. Account taken from John Smith’s article on the camp. These men caused no trouble for the guards but seemed bored and had nothing to do. The reported goes on to lament that they should be put to better use. Certainly, in the early days, the inmates had nothing to occupy their time so this could have been the reason for four of the detainees to be sent to the mental asylum in Mullingar. By July 1916, it was reported that the detainees had formed committees to run the camp. They took charge of their own washing, drinking water and cooking. There were 3 bakers and 12 cooks among the inmates who provided all the meals for the camp. They were provided with regulation provisions which included "bread, biscuits, fresh or frozen meat, tea, coffee, salt, sugar, condensed milk, fresh vegetables, cheese, butter, peas, beans, lentils and rice". Account taken from John Smith's article on the detention centre. The rest of the men practiced their trades by making toys, jewellery, boots and wood-carving. Many men spent their days painting and sketching. The camp also had two orchestras which gave concerts and played for dramatic performances.

Apart from the boredom one of the other issues for the inmates was the relationships with their families. This led to many divorces and estrangement from their children. There were numerous escape attempts reported in newspapers. One of the most notorious attempts was by Carl Morlang and Aphonsus Grein, who managed to escape for a few days. On the night of 14 August at 9.30 pm the prisoners were noticed missing at roll-call. Morlang and Grein left the prison and made their way northwards to Ballyjamesduff, County Cavan, disguised as two clergymen. ‘At the village of Denn a few miles from Cavan, Grein entered the public house and treated all hands in lavish style.’ An account taken from The Anglo Celt. They were captured the following day by the local constabulary and returned to the camp. When they were searched, they were found to be carrying maps, supplies and money, which they should not have been able to obtain. Also among their belongings it was said there was a letter addressed to Charles Fox thanking him for helping them escape. He was a decorated ex-officer in the British Army and a successful businessman. He was very republican in his views, so he was arrested and tried for treason, which was a hanging offence. However, the charges were dropped. He returned to Oldcastle and was treated like a hero by the locals.

Two inmates were killed at Oldcastle during the years 1914–1918. One on 17 September 1917 during an escape with another inmate. August Bockmeyer was shot when he refused to stop. Although he survived the shooting, he later succumbed to his injuries. There was an enquiry and it was declared that ‘Private Tiernan’s actions to be “quite justified” in the “discharge” of his duty.’ As stated by the article by John Smith. The second, Franz Xaver Seemeier, died in January 1917. According to the information given to the press by the camp authorities, the detainee was playing football when he collided with another player and was taken to the infirmary; the following day he died from serious internal injuries. According to an account written by an internee, Seemeier was bayoneted by a guard after he had been seen approaching the barbed wire fence.

After the 1916 Rising, the political landscape had changed in most of Ireland. There was an anti-conscription meeting in Oldcastle held on 13 April 1918. The guest speaker was Arthur Griffith, a key figure in Sinn Féin. The rally was attended by thousands of people and was only 300 metres away from the camp. The speeches taking place were very Nationalist and anti-British. Prisoners watched from the roof of the camp ‘from which the meeting was visible’. Account taken from The Anglo Celt. Once the speeches had ended, the crowd moved towards the prison, but nothing became of this. Following this incident and the political concerns at the time, the British decided to move the prisoners from Oldcastle. On 25 May 1918, a specially commissioned train left Oldcastle to go to the North Wall in Dublin. The prisoners were then taken by ship to Knockaloe Camp on the Isle of Man. Oldcastle was returned to its previous owners, the Oldcastle Board of Guardians and fell into disuse. In May 1920, during the War of Independence, Oldcastle Workhouse was set ablaze by the local IRA to stop the British from using it as a military base. The main buildings no longer stand; the only thing still standing is the perimeter wall.

== Entertainment ==
The Oldcastle Agricultural Show is held on the third Sunday in July in the Gilson National Park. Each year, it attracts thousands of people to the town. Live music, fashion, children's entertainment, and other events are held. YouTube singer Father Ray Kelly performed at the 2016 event.

Le Chéile Arts & Music Festival is held on the bank holiday weekend in August at various venues around the town. The festival has been running since 1998 and has featured acts such as Aslan, The Saw Doctors, Shane MacGowan, The Riptide Movement and Kodaline.

== Sport ==
Oldcastle is a centre for anglers & is ideally located four miles (6.4 km) from Lough Ramor (County Cavan), a lake that is noted for its coarse fishing.

Oldcastle is also ideally located six miles (10 km) from Lough Sheelin (County Cavan) which is noted for its trout fishing.

Oldcastle GAA club is over 125 years old. It competes in the Meath Intermediate Football Championship and is in Division 1 of the League.

The town has a wide range of other clubs available for all to join. The track and mountain running club of Saint Brigid's Athletic club are also located in close proximity of Mullaghmeen forest with such notable members as Gerrard Heery who finished 2nd over 40 in Snowdon international mountain race 2013, and other endurance members who have completed and ranked highly in many international multi day adventure and foot races representing his club and country

== Economy and tourism ==
Oldcastle acts as a retail and service centre for the surrounding hinterland, and is also home to a number of furniture-manufacturing and engineering businesses.

The town's bed-manufacturing industries have included firms such as Gleneagle Woodcrafts, Briody Bedding and Respa Bedding which are a major source of employment for the area. In 1999, a fire broke out at Gleneagle Woodcrafts, killing one woman. The site has since been restored and continues to operate. A similar event occurred on the night of October 31, 2020, when a fire tore through an Oldcastle Co-Operative building.

There are the engineering firms located in the parish of Moylagh, County Meath, approximately 5.0 mi (8 kilometres) from the town. These industries have attracted immigrants to the area for work, including from Lithuania and Poland. As of the 2016 census, for example, there were approximately 210 Lithuanian-born people living in the town.

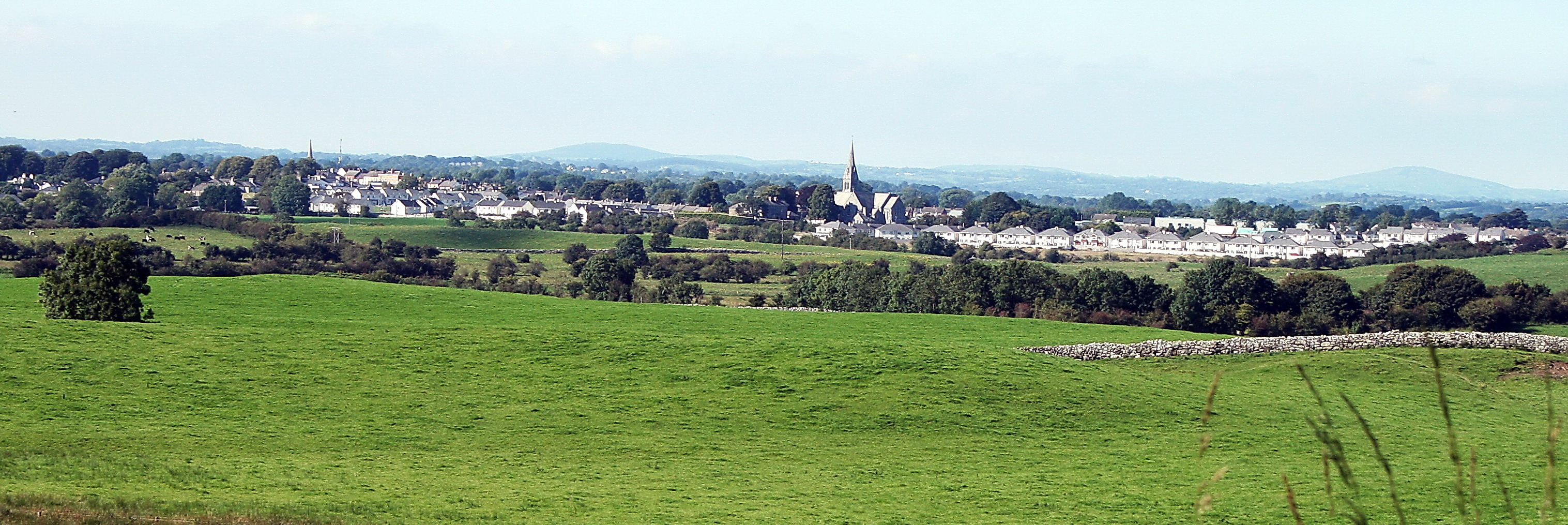
Oldcastle seen from Loughcrew

Oldcastle is located a short distance from the Loughcrew Cairns, a group of ancient tombs that were built around 3300 BCE as passage tombs.

== Local geography ==
Oldcastle is located in the foothills of Sliabh na Caillaigh.

In 2005, an environmental disaster occurred in Oldcastle when a sewage treatment plant overflowed and spilled into the River Inny. 4,000 wild brown trout were killed as a result.

== Education ==
There is a mixed primary school, Gilson National School, and a secondary school, St. Oliver Post Primary. This secondary school has been expanded in recent years, with the opening of a new building in 2002. The secondary school celebrated its 50th anniversary in 2009, opening four new classrooms on the date. Noel Dempsey and Bishop Micheal Smith were present. On 3 March 2007, the school won the All-Ireland Vocational Schools Championship Senior Cup 'B' Competition in Gaelic football.

Recently, a new community library was opened replacing a smaller library in the town and is located next to the local Credit Union.

== Architecture ==
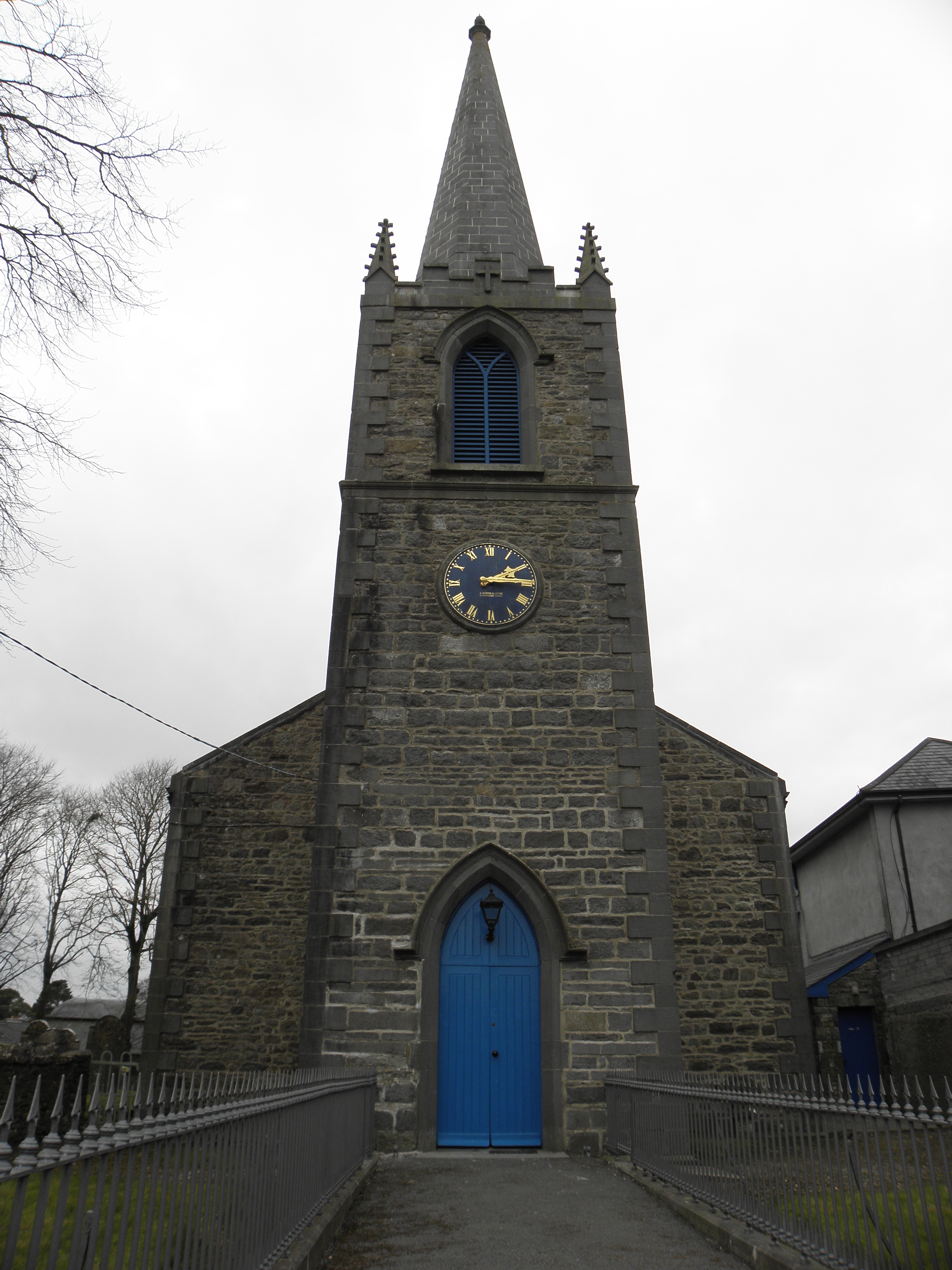
St. Brides Church of Ireland church in Oldcastle

The Gilson National School is said by the local Chamber of Commerce to be the "Gem in the Crown of Oldcastle's architecture". The Gilson National School's trust and building owe their existence to the generosity of Laurence Gilson, a native of Oldcastle and Moylagh Parish. A statue of Gilson was unveiled in May 2011. Gilson donated money to the town of Oldcastle in 1810 for the establishment of a multi-faith school.

The Show Hall in Oldcastle is located near the church. It hosts bingo, show dances, show bands and Le Chéile concerts annually.

== Transport ==
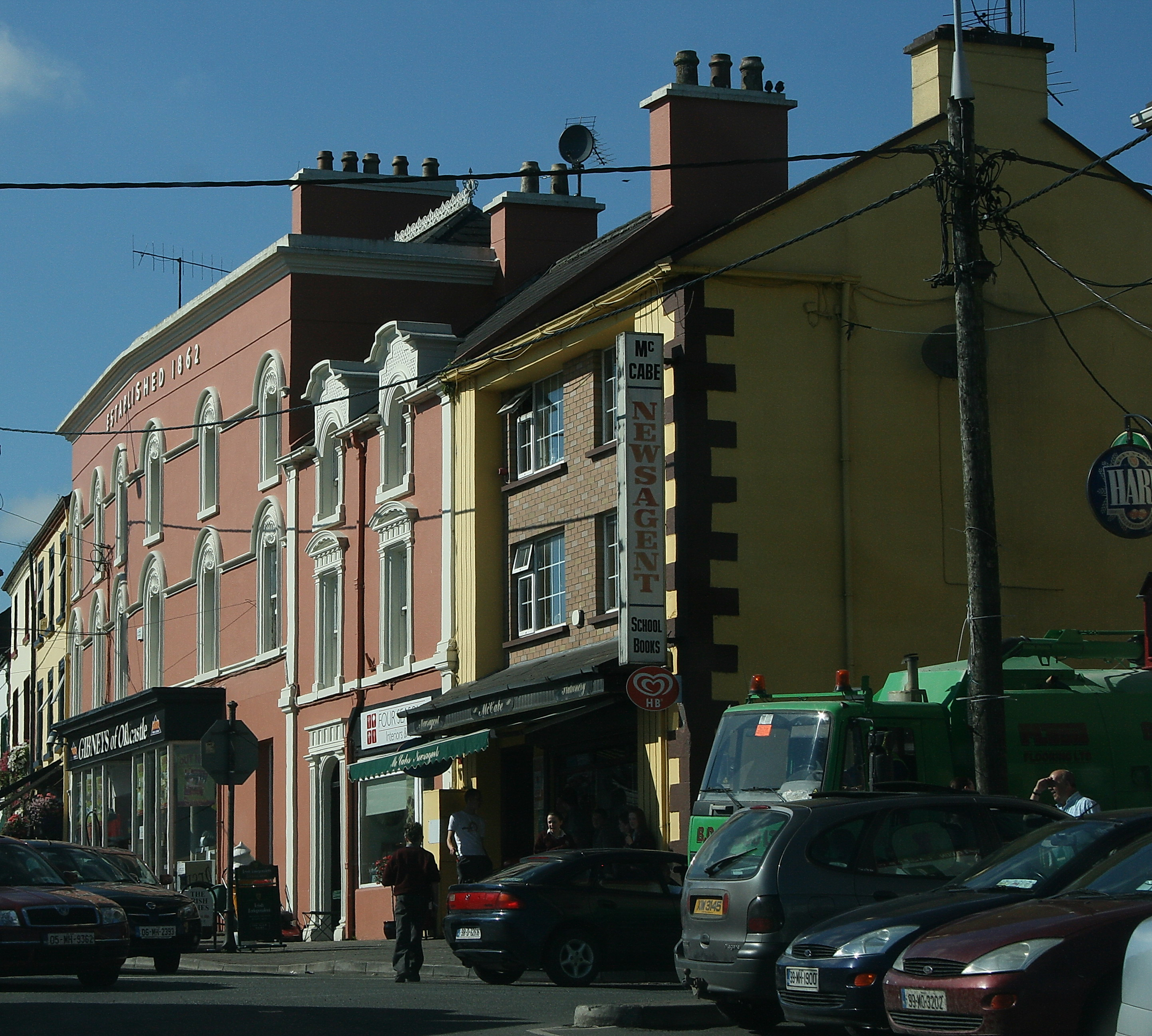
Traffic in central Oldcastle

=== Rail ===
Oldcastle railway station, at the end of a branch line from Navan, opened on 17 March 1863 and for many years provided a source of revenue and income for local farmers as well as other industries in the area by allowing local goods and produce to be transported to the main ports of Ireland for export. The station closed for passenger traffic on 14 April 1958, and the branch finally closed altogether on 1 April 1963, during a period when numerous railway lines were being closed.

=== Bus ===
Bus Éireann route 187 services Oldcastle from Monday to Saturday. It provides transport to neighbouring towns and villages of Mountnugent, Ballyjamesduff, Virginia and Kells. Onward connections e.g. to Dublin, Cavan, Navan and Enniskillen are available at Virginia/Kells. There are four journeys both to and from Oldcastle each weekday. Subject to road safety, the bus will stop to pick up and set down passengers at any safe point along the route.

== Notable people ==
- Jordie Barrett (1997-), New Zealand Rugby Union player who spent 15 months of his youth in nearby farm
- Rory Galligan (1973–2012), rally driver
- Ray Kelly, singing priest
- Alicia Adelaide Needham (1863–1945), composer of songs and ballads
- Thomas Nulty Roman Catholic bishop (1818–1898) and land reform advocate
- Richard Ridgeway, Victoria Cross recipient
- Michael Smith, Roman Catholic Bishop of Meath from 1990 until 2018

== International relations ==
Oldcastle has a town twinning agreement with Tecumseh, Ontario, Canada.

== See also ==
- List of towns and villages in Ireland
- Midlands Gateway
- Real Irish Republican Army
