= Ballinagh =

Village in County Cavan, Ireland

Bellananagh Béal Átha na nEach
- Village
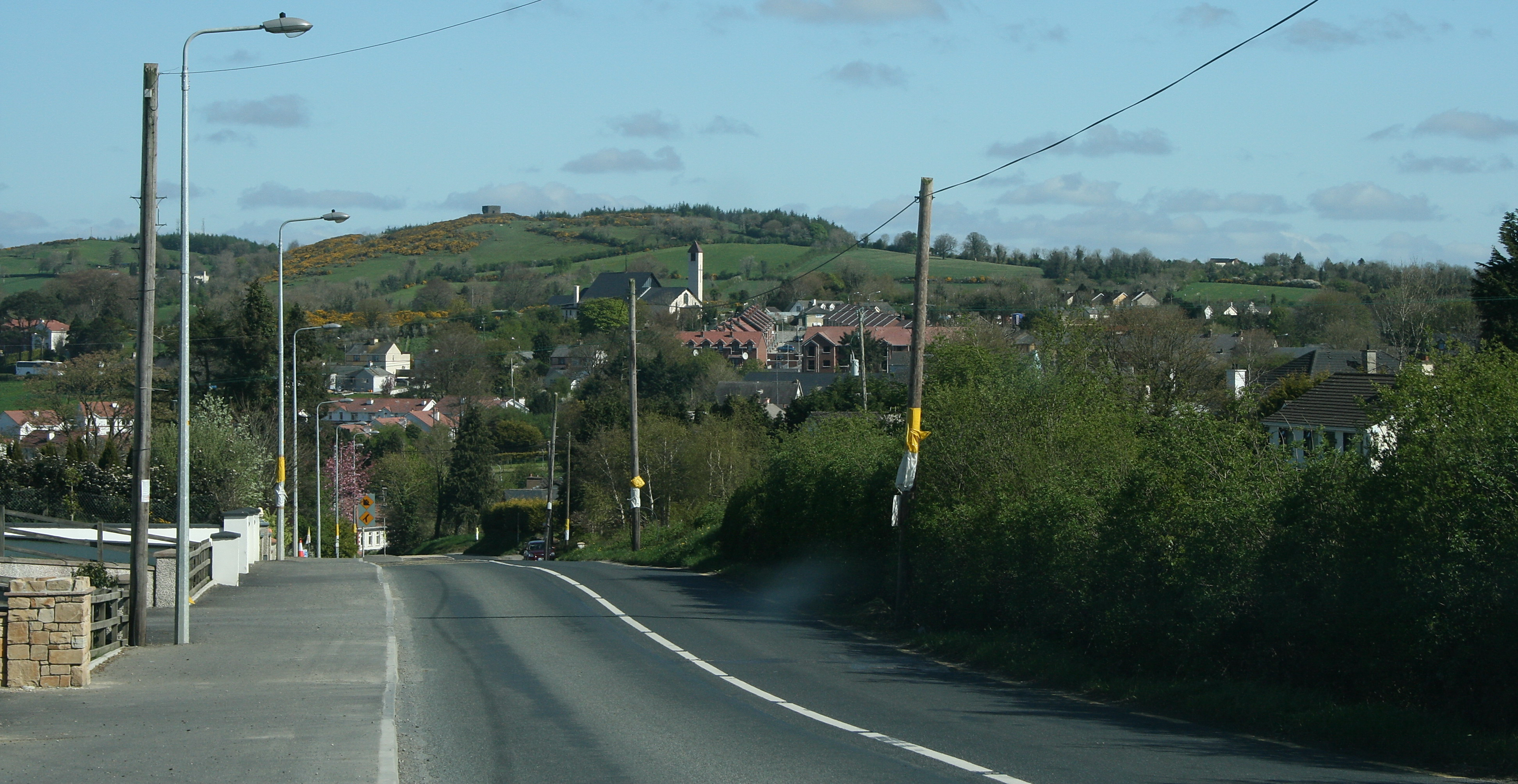
- Approaching Bellananagh from the south on the N55

- Location in Ireland
- Coordinates: 53°56′N 7°25′W
- Country: Ireland
- Province: Ulster
- County: County Cavan

Population (2022)
  - Total: 1,012
- Irish Grid Reference: N389980
- Bellananagh is the official spelling.

Ballinagh, officially Bellananagh (Irish: Béal Átha na nEach, meaning 'ford-mouth of the horses'), is a village in County Cavan, Ireland. It lies on the N55 midlands route.

== Buildings of note ==
Ballinagh Market House is a five-bay two-storey building constructed in 1821; it is currently in use as a store house. It was designed by Arthur McClean who also designed the market houses at nearby Ballyjamesduff and at Balbriggan in north County Dublin.

== Transport ==
Local Link Cavan–Monaghan Route C2 links the village with Cavan and Cavan General Hospital eight times daily Monday to Thursday, eleven times daily Friday and Saturday, and five times daily on Sunday.

Ballinagh is also served by various Bus Éireann routes. Route 111A serves Ballinagh four times daily Monday to Saturday, and once daily on Sunday, linking it to Cavan as well as to Granard, Castlepollard and Delvin, with onward connections in Delvin to Route 111 for Athboy, Trim and Dublin. Route 466 provides several daily journeys to Athlone. Route 65 provides a once daily service Monday to Saturday to Longford and Athlone, as well as Cavan, Clones and Monaghan, with onward connections in Monaghan to Ulsterbus Route 271 for Armagh and Belfast; in addition to a once daily service to Cavan as well as to Longford and Galway on Friday and Sunday. Route 465 provides a once weekly service on Tuesdays to Cavan as well as Losset, Arvagh, Killeshandra, Ballyconnell and Carrigallen.

== Sport ==
Ballinagh GAA is the local Gaelic Athletic Association club. In 2007, Ballinagh won the Ulster Intermediate Football Championship, becoming the first Cavan club side to ever win a provincial title. In 2013, the club won the Cavan Senior Football Championship for the first in their 125-year history. Ballinagh is represented by Conor Dourneen who in 2020 was the youngest GAA Referee on the National Elite Panel along with other Cavan representatives Joe McQuillan and Noel Mooney.

== See also ==
- List of towns and villages in Ireland
- Market Houses in Ireland
