= Kilskeer =

Village in County Meath, Ireland

Coordinates: 53°42′N 7°00′W

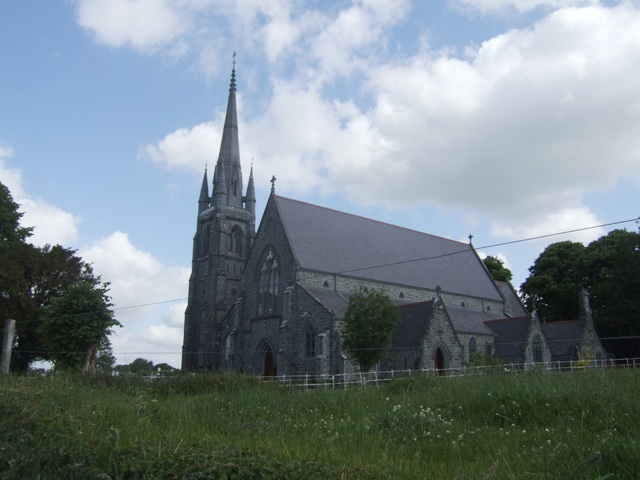
St. Alphonsus' Roman Catholic Parish Church in Kilskeer, designed by J. J. McCarthy in 1847.

Kilskeer or Kilskyre is a townland and small village in County Meath, Ireland, 10 kilometres (6 miles) southwest of the town of Kells. The village is in the civil parish of Kilskeer.

It is the birthplace of Brian O'Higgins, the revolutionary and poet who was president of Sinn Féin in the 1930s. Jim Connell, the political activist and writer of the socialist anthem "The Red Flag", was born in the nearby townland of Rathniska.

== See also ==
- List of towns and villages in Ireland
