= R158 road (Ireland) =

Road in Ireland

R158 road
- Bóthar R158
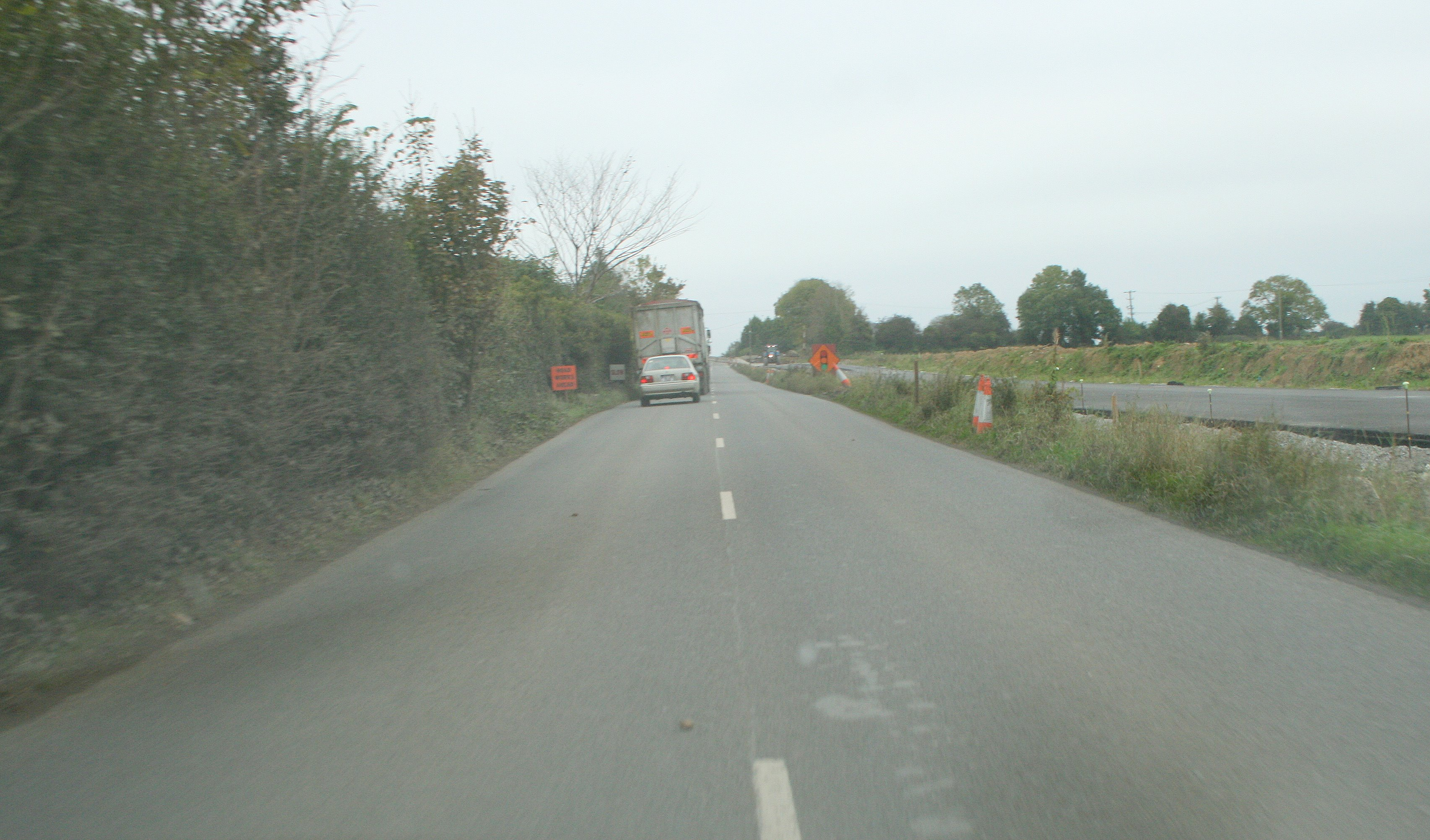
- Realignment works on the R158 between Summerhill and Kilcock in October 2007

Route information
- Length: 22 km (14 mi)

Location
- Country: Ireland
- Primary destinations: County Meath; Trim - R161; (R159); Summerhill - joins/leaves the R156; Garadice; County Kildare; Kilcock terminates at the R148

Highway system
- Roads in Ireland; Motorways; Primary; Secondary; Regional

The R158 road is a regional road in Ireland, linking Trim in County Meath to Kilcock in County Kildare. The road, which is single-carriageway throughout, has been extensively realigned in recent years at a cost of €22m, the section between Kilcock and Summerhill having been completed by Fallon Construction in August 2008.

== Route ==
The road runs in a south-southeasterly direction from a junction with the R161 in Trim by way of Summerhill to a junction with the R148 in Kilcock.

== See also ==
- Roads in Ireland
- National primary road
- National secondary road
