= R163 road (Ireland) =

Road in County Meath, Ireland

Coordinates: 53.699152°N 6.709937°W

R163 road
- Bóthar R163
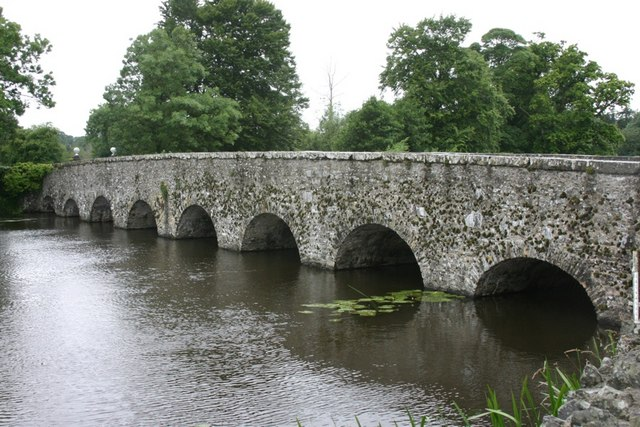
- R163 crossing the Leinster Blackwater at the Headford Bridge

Route information
- Length: 35.5 km (22.1 mi)

Major junctions
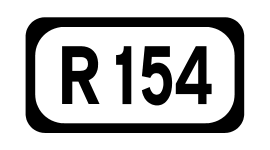
- From: Big Ballinglough

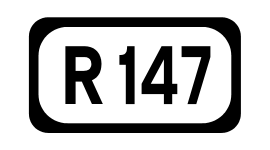
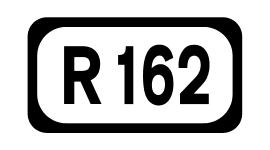
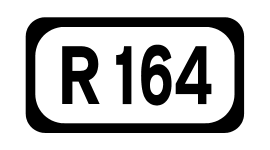
- Kells Crosses Leinster Blackwater

- To: Slane Castle

Location
- Country: Ireland

Highway system
- Roads in Ireland; Motorways; Primary; Secondary; Regional

The R163 road, known as the Kells Road, is a regional road in Ireland, located in central County Meath.
