= R161 road (Ireland) =

Regional road in Ireland

R161 road
- Bóthar R161
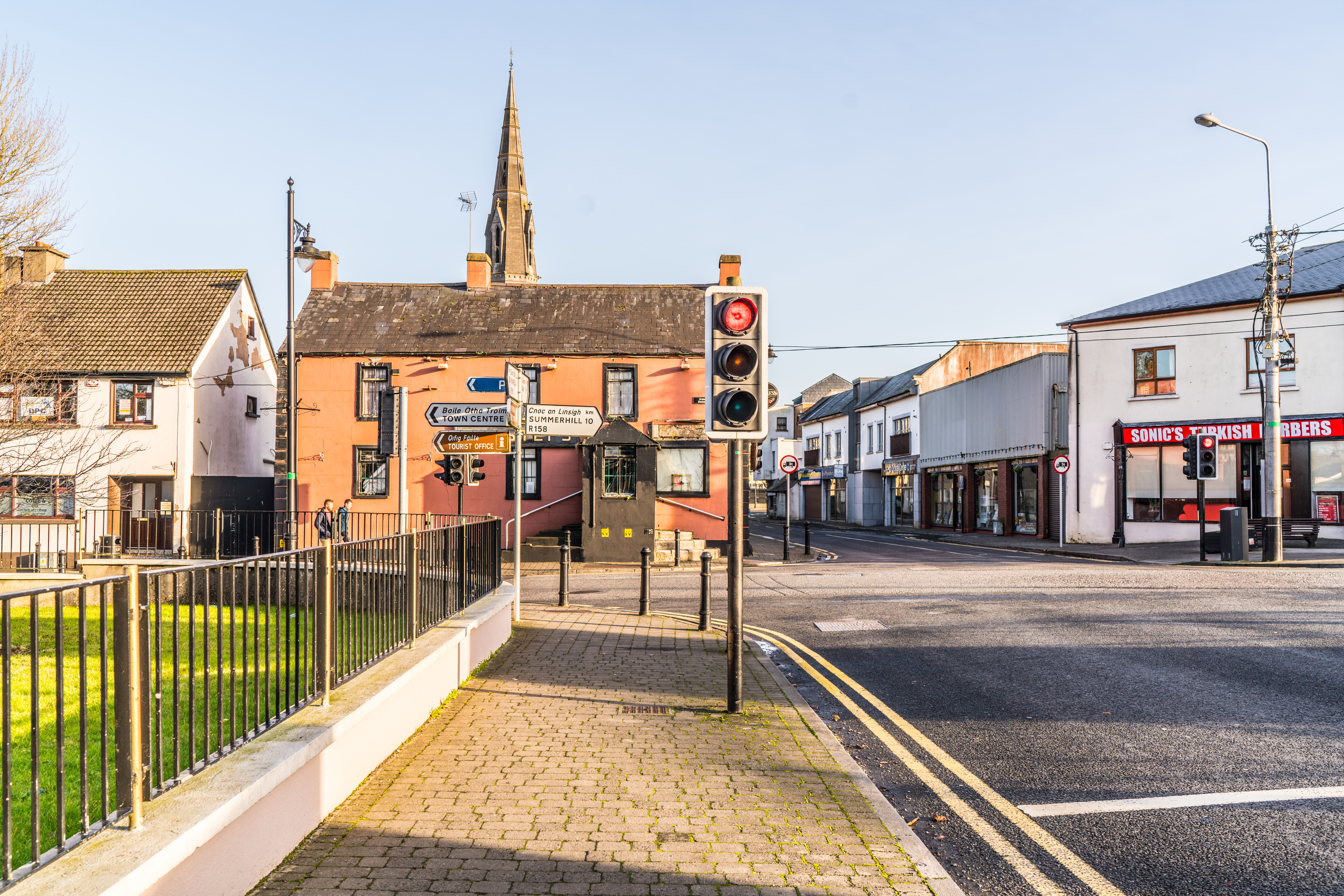
- At Emmet Street, Trim, on the R161

Location
- Country: Ireland

Highway system
- Roads in Ireland; Motorways; Primary; Secondary; Regional

The R161 road is a regional road in Ireland. It runs from Navan in County Meath to Kinnegad in County Westmeath.
