= 2021 Cavan Senior Football Championship =

2021 Kiernan's Service Station Cavan Senior Football Championship
Tournament details
- County: Cavan
- Province: Ulster
- Year: 2021
- Trophy: Oliver Plunkett Cup
- Sponsor: Kiernan's Service Station
- Date: 2 September – 14 November 2021
- Teams: 13
- Defending champions: Crosserlough

Winners
- Champions: Ramor United (5th win)
- Manager: Ray Cole
- Captain: Ado Cole
- Qualify for: Ulster Club SFC

Runners-up
- Runners-up: Gowna
- Manager: Fintan Reilly; Dermot McCabe
- Captain: Ryan McGahern

Promotion/Relegation
- Relegated team(s): Shercock; Castlerahan

The 2021 Cavan Senior Football Championship was the 112th edition of Cavan GAA's premier Gaelic football tournament for senior graded clubs in County Cavan, Ireland. The tournament consists of 13 teams, with the winner going on to represent Cavan in the Ulster Senior Club Football Championship. The championship began on 2 September 2021.

Crosserlough entered the championship as the defending champions, but exited the championship at the group stage.

Gowna and Ramor United contested the final on 7 November, and the game finished as a draw. The next week on 14 November, Ramor came out on top in the replay to secure their 5th senior championship, and their first since 2016.

The replayed final was the first senior men's county final in the country to be refereed by a woman, by Laragh United's Maggie Farrelly.

== Team changes ==
The following teams have changed division since the 2020 championship season.

=== To Championship ===
Promoted from 2020 Cavan Intermediate Football Championship

- Ballinagh (Intermediate Champions)

== League stage ==
All 13 teams enter the competition at this stage. A random draw determines which teams face each other in each of the four rounds. No team can meet each other twice in the group stage. The top eight teams go into a seeded draw for the quarter-finals, while the bottom four teams enter the relegation play-offs.

Pos	Team	Pld	W	D	L	PF	PA	PD	Pts	Qualification or relegation
1	Gowna	4	4	0	0	80	53	+27	8	Advance to quarter-final
2	Kingscourt Stars	4	4	0	0	67	47	+20	8	Advance to quarter-final
3	Ramor United	4	3	1	0	81	54	+27	7	Advance to quarter-final
4	Cavan Gaels	4	3	1	0	66	47	+19	7	Advance to quarter-final
5	Laragh United	4	1	2	1	69	64	+5	4	Advance to quarter-final
6	Ballinagh	4	1	2	1	66	71	−5	4	Advance to quarter-final
7	Lavey	4	2	0	2	58	64	−6	4	Advance to quarter-final
8	Mullahoran	4	2	0	2	41	60	−19	4	Advance to quarter-final
9	Crosserlough	4	1	1	2	56	56	0	3	
10	Killygarry	4	1	0	3	53	48	+5	2	Advance to relegation play-offs
11	Lacken Celtic	4	0	1	3	48	90	−42	1	Advance to relegation play-offs
12	Shercock	4	0	0	4	54	68	−14	0	Advance to relegation play-offs
13	Castlerahan	4	0	0	4	51	68	−17	0	Advance to relegation play-offs

Source: Cavan GAA

=== Round 1 ===
2 September 2021 Round 1	Crosserlough	0–14 – 1–12	Ramor United	Kingspan Breffni
20:00		Report

3 September 2021 Round 1	Gowna	2–8 – 0–13	Killygarry	Kingspan Breffni
20:00		Report

4 September 2021 Round 1	Lavey	5–5 – 2–11	Castlerahan	St Matthew's Park
18:00

4 September 2021 Round 1	Kingscourt Stars	0–13 – 1–9	Shercock	St Anne's Park
18:00

4 September 2021 Round 1	Laragh United	1–15 – 0–18	Lacken	Athletic Grounds
18:00

5 September 2021 Round 1	Ballinagh	0–16 – 4–13	Cavan Gaels	Joe Crowe Park
13:00		Report

=== Round 2 ===
9 September 2021 Round 2	Lavey	1–11 – 2–17	Laragh United	Kingspan Breffni
20:00		Report

10 September 2021 Round 2	Castlerahan	0–12 – 1–11	Mullahoran	Kingspan Breffni
20:00

12 September 2021 Round 2	Killygarry	0–13 – 1–11	Kingscourt Stars	Kingspan Breffni
13:00		Report

12 September 2021 Round 2	Ramor United	2–16 – 1–19	Ballinagh	Kingspan Breffni
16:00		Report

12 September 2021 Round 2	Crosserlough	0–10 – 0–10	Cavan Gaels	St Matthew's Park
17:00

12 September 2021 Round 2	Gowna	4–15 – 1–7	Lacken	Kingspan Breffni
19:00

=== Round 3 ===
18 September 2021 Round 3	Ramor United	1–15 – 1–10	Shercock	Jim Smith Park
17:30				Referee: John Emmo

18 September 2021 Round 3	Mullahoran	0–11 – 0–10	Killygarry	Kingspan Breffni
19:30				Referee: James Clarke

=== Round 4 ===
24 September 2021 Round 4	Crosserlough	2–10 – 3–10	Gowna	Kingspan Breffni
20:00		Report		Referee: Noel Mooney

25 September 2021 Round 4	Kingscourt Stars	4–16 – 2–5	Lacken	Dolan Park
17:00				Referee: Martin Sexton

25 September 2021 Round 4	Mullahoran	0–5 – 2–20	Ramor United	Kingspan Breffni
19:30				Referee: Margaret Farrelly

26 September 2021 Round 4	Shercock	1–12 – 3–8	Lavey	Kingspan Breffni
13:00		Report		Referee: Conor Dourneen

26 September 2021 Round 4	Ballinagh	2–10 – 1–13	Laragh United	St Matthew's Park
14:00				Referee: Barry McMenamin

26 September 2021 Round 4	Castlerahan	1–11 – 2–16	Cavan Gaels	Kingspan Breffni
19:00				Referee: Joe McQuillan

=== Round 5 ===
3 October 2021 Round 5	Shercock	1–11 – 3–11	Gowna	Jim Smith Park
16:00

3 October 2021 Round 5	Ballinagh	0–12 – 1–5	Castlerahan	St Matthew's Park
16:00				Referee: Brendan Sweeney

3 October 2021 Round 5	Laragh United	1–9 – 1–13	Crosserlough	Kingspan Breffni
16:00				Referee: Joe McQuillan

3 October 2021 Round 5	Lavey	0–7 – 1–6	Cavan Gaels	Annalee Park
16:00				Referee: James Clarke

3 October 2021 Round 5	Lacken	1–6 – 1–14	Killygarry	Páirc Naomh Fionnán
16:00				Referee: Pat Clarke

3 October 2021 Round 5	Kingscourt Stars	0–12 – 1–8	Mullahoran	Dolan Park
16:00				Referee: John Emmo

== Knock-out stage ==
Quarter-finals
Kingscourt Stars	0–13
Lavey	0–8
Gowna	1–14
Mullahoran	0–6
Cavan Gaels	1–11
Laragh United	0–10
Ramor United	1–13
Ballinagh	0–13

Semi-finals
Kingscourt Stars	0–11
Gowna	3–12
Cavan Gaels	0–11
Ramor United	1–9

Final
Gowna	0–10; 0–14 (R)
Ramor United	0–10; 1–15 (R)

=== Quarter-finals ===
8 October 2021 Quarter-final	Cavan Gaels	1–11 – 0–10	Laragh United	Kingspan Breffni
20:00	Paul O'Connor 1–2, Gearoid McKiernan 0–3 (0–2f), Niall Smith 0–2, Luke Fortune 0–1, Robert Maloney-Derham 0–1, Padraig Sexton 0–1, Luke Molloy 0–1	Report	Paul Smith 0–5 (0–2f), Shane O'Rourke 0–2, Jack McKenna 0–2, Patrick Rudden 0–1	Referee: Conor Dourneen

9 October 2021 Quarter-final	Kingscourt Stars	0–13 – 0–8	Lavey	Kingspan Breffni
19:30	Barry Reilly 0–5 (0–4f, 0–1m), Joe Dillon 0–2 (0–1m), Padraig Faulkner 0–2, Cian Shekleton 0–1 (0–1f), Philip Tinnelly 0–1, Barry Tully 0–1, Peter Corrigan 0–1	Report	Shane Tierney 0–4 (0–1m), Karl Duke 0–1 (0–1f), Darragh Tierney 0–1, Darren Jordan 0–1, Diarmuid Conaty 0–1	Referee: Pat Clarke

10 October 2021 Quarter-final	Ramor United	1–13 – 0–13	Ballinagh	Kingspan Breffni
16:00	James Brady 0–6 (0–5f), Jack Brady 1–0, Laurence Caffrey 0–2, Enda Maguire 0–1, Brían O'Connell 0–1, Simon Cadden 0–1, Sean McEvoy 0–1, Paddy McNamee 0–1	Report	Thomas Moore 0–4 (0–1f), Kevin Smith 0–4 (0–3f), Niall McDermott 0–2 (0–1f), David Finnegan 0–2, Thomas Smith 0–1	Referee: James Clarke

10 October 2021 Quarter-final	Gowna	1–14 – 0–6	Mullahoran	Kingspan Breffni
19:00	Robbie Fitzpatrick 0–4 (0–3f), Gerald Pearson 1–0, Conor Madden 0–3 (0–1m), Conor Brady 0–2, Ryan Donohoe 0–2, T. J. Fitzpatrick 0–1, Conor Casey 0–1, Oisin Pierson 0–1	Report	Enda O'Reilly 0–3 (0–3f), Gavin Brady 0–2 (0–2f), Philip Brady 0–1	Referee: Barry McMenamin

=== Semi-finals ===
24 October 2021 Semi-final	Kingscourt Stars	0–11 – 3–12	Gowna	Kingspan Breffni
14:30	Barry Reilly 0–5 (0–4f), Peter Corrigan 0–2, Cian Shekleton 0–1 (0–1f), Kevin Curtis 0–1, Padraig Faulkner 0–1, Joe Dillon 0–1	Report	Conor Madden 1–4, Tiarnan Madden 1–0, Conor Brady 1–0, Cian Madden 0–2 (0–1f), Robbie Fitzpatrick 0–1 (0–1f), Oisin Pierson 0–1 (0–1m), Cormac Brady 0–1, Ryan Brady 0–1, Ryan Donohoe 0–1, Conor Casey 0–1	Referee: Joe McQuillan

24 October 2021 Semi-final	Cavan Gaels	0–11 – 1–9	Ramor United	Kingspan Breffni
16:30	Gearoid McKiernan 0–6 (0–3f), Jack Tully 0–2, Luke Molloy 0–1 (0–1m), Robert Maloney-Derham 0–1, Niall Murray 0–1	Report	Sean McEvoy 1–3, James Brady 0–4 (0–2f), Ado Cole 0–1, Cathal Maguire 0–1	Referee: Oliver Óg O'Reilly

=== Final ===
7 November 2021 Final	Gowna	0–10 – 0–10	Ramor United	Kingspan Breffni
15:00	Cian Madden 0–3 (0–2f), Robbie Fitzpatrick 0–2 (0–2f), Aaron Brady 0–2, Oisin Pierson 0–1, Ryan Donohoe 0–1, Mark McKeever 0–1	Report	James Brady 0–5 (0–3f), Ado Cole 0–2, Jack Brady 0–1, Mark Magee 0–1, Ben Smith 0–1	Referee: Pat Clarke

14 November 2021 Final replay	Gowna	0–14 – 1–15	Ramor United	Kingspan Breffni
14:30	Cian Madden 0–4 (0–4f), Robbie Fitzpatrick 0–4 (0–3f), Conor Madden 0–2, Oisin Pierson 0–2, Aaron Brady 0–1, Conor Casey 0–1	Report	James Brady 1–8 (0–4f), Sean McEvoy 0–4 (0–2f), Ado Cole 0–3	Referee: Margaret Farrelly; Man of the Match: James Brady (Ramor United)

== Relegation play-offs ==
The 4 bottom placed teams the league phase will play off against each other. The 2 winners will maintain their senior status for 2022 while the 2 losers will be relegated to the 2022 Intermediate Championship.

9 October 2021 Relegation play-off	Lacken	1–11 – 2–6	Shercock	Joe Crowe Park
16:30		Report		Referee: Joe McQuillan

10 October 2021 Relegation play-off	Killygarry	1–11 – 0–8	Castlerahan	Athletic Grounds
13:00				Referee: Margaret Farrelly
