= 2013 Cavan Senior Football Championship =

County-level annual Gaelic sports competition, Ireland

2013 Cavan SFC
Tournament details
- County: Cavan
- Province: Ulster
- Year: 2013
- Trophy: Oliver Plunkett Cup
- Sponsor: Hotel Kilmore
- Date: 9 August - 13 October 2013
- Teams: 17
- Defending champions: Mullahoran

Winners
- Champions: Ballinagh (1st win)
- Manager: Ciaran O'Reilly
- Captain: Killian McBride
- Qualify for: 2013 Ulster Club SFC

Runners-up
- Runners-up: Cavan Gaels
- Manager: Joe O'Connor
- Captain: Eamonn Reilly

Promotion/Relegation
- Relegated team(s): Belturbet

Other
- Player of the Year: Eamonn Reilly (Cavan Gaels)

The 2013 Cavan Senior Football Championship was the 105th edition of Cavan GAA's premier club Gaelic football tournament for senior graded teams in County Cavan, Ireland. The tournament consists of 17 teams, with the winner going on to represent Cavan in the Ulster Senior Club Football Championship.

Mullahoran were the defending champions, but exited the championship to Cavan Gaels at the quarter-final stage.

Ballinagh defeated a fancied Cavan Gaels side in the final to claim their first Senior title.

== Team changes ==
The following teams have changed division since the 2013 championship season.

=== To Championship ===
Promoted from 2012 Cavan Intermediate Football Championship

- Lacken - (Intermediate Champions)
- Crosserlough

== Opening rounds ==
=== Preliminary rounds ===
9 August 2013 Preliminary round A	Cavan Gaels	3-6 – 0-7	Lacken	Breffni Park
20:00		Report		Referee: Brendan Sweeney

11 August 2013 Preliminary round B	Ramor United	4-9 – 0-7	Drumgoon	Breffni Park
19:00		Report		Referee: Michael Lee

17 August 2013 Preliminary round C	Lacken	4-12 – 3-9	Drumgoon	Ramor Park
17:00				Referee: Chris McCaffrey

=== Round 1 ===
16 August 2013 Round 1	Ballinagh	0-11 – 0-7	Drumalee	Breffni Park
17:00		Report		Referee: Chris McCaffrey

16 August 2013 Round 1	Castlerahan	4-18 – 1-14	Redhills	Lavey GAA Grounds
19:30				Referee: Margaret Farrelly

17 August 2013 Round 1	Gowna	0-13 – 1-9	Kingscourt Stars	Ramor Park
19:00		Report		Referee: Raymond Tynan

17 August 2013 Round 1	Crosserlough	3-6 – 0-13	Lavey	Breffni Park
20:00		Report		Referee: Michael G Brady

18 August 2013 Round 1	Killygarry	0-14 – 0-12 (a.e.t.)	Denn	Breffni Park
14:00		Report		Referee: Raymond Kelly

18 August 2013 Round 1	Cuchulainns	0-11 – 1-5	Belturbet	Breffni Park
15:30		Report		Referee: Martin Sexton

18 August 2013 Round 1	Ramor United	1-11 – 0-11	Mullahoran	Breffni Park
19:00		Report		Referee: Noel Mooney

23 August 2013 Round 1	Cavan Gaels	2-17 – 1-15	Lacken	Breffni Park
20:00				Referee: Joe McQuillan

=== Round 2A ===
24 August 2013 Round 2A	Ballinagh	0-12 – 0-8	Cuchulainns	Ramor Park
18:30				Referee: Raymond Tynan

24 August 2013 Round 2A	Crosserlough	0-10 – 0-6	Killygarry	Breffni Park
20:00		Report		Referee: Gerry Sheridan

25 August 2013 Round 2A	Ramor United	3-15 – 1-7	Gowna	Breffni Park
13:30				Referee: Kieran McCarville

31 August 2013 Round 2A	Castlerahan	1-10 – 0-8	Cavan Gaels	Breffni Park
19:30		Report		Referee: Kieran McCarville

== Back-door stage ==
=== Round 2B ===
24 August 2013 Round 2B	Lavey	1-13 – 1-5	Belturbet	Annalee Park
18:30				Referee: John Cassidy

25 August 2013 Round 2B	Mullahoran	0-11 – 0-8	Redhills	Ballinagh
13:30				Referee: Packie Smith

25 August 2013 Round 2B	Kingscourt Stars	1-18 – 2-6	Denn	Breffni Park
19:30		Report		Referee: Jimmy Galligan

1 September 2013 Round 2B	Lacken	1-13 – 1-8	Drumalee	P. J. Duke Park
13:30				Referee: Joe McQuillan

=== Round 3 ===
7 September 2013 Round 3	Lavey	0-10 – 0-7	Cuchulainns	Ramor Park
18:00				Referee: Padraig Kellegher

8 September 2013 Round 3	Mullahoran	4-13 – 0-7	Gowna	Breffni Park
13:30		Report		Referee: Joe McQuillan

8 September 2013 Round 3	Lacken	0-13 – 1-10 (a.e.t.)	Killygarry	Breffni Park
18:00		Report		Referee: Tony Gregory

8 September 2013 Round 3	Cavan Gaels	1-14 – 1-11	Kingscourt Stars	Breffni Park
19:30		Report		Referee: Martin Brady

14 September 2013 Round 3 replay	Lacken	3-10 – 0-15 (a.e.t.)	Killygarry	Ballinagh GAA Grounds
17:30				Referee: James Clarke

== Knock-out stage ==
Quarter-finals
Ballinagh	0-16
Lacken	1-9
Crosserlough	0-10
Lavey	0-7
Cavan Gaels	2-8
Mullahoran	1-8
Castlerahan	1-10
Ramor United	0-9

Semi-finals
Ballinagh	2-9
Crosserlough	1-10
Cavan Gaels	2-14
Castlerahan	0-7

Final
Ballinagh	0-12
Cavan Gaels	0-11

=== Quarter finals ===
14 September 2013 Quarter-final	Crosserlough	0-10 – 0-7	Lavey	Ramor Park
18:00

15 September 2013 Quarter-final	Castlerahan	1-10 – 0-9	Ramor United	Breffni Park
19:00				Referee: Margaret Farrelly

20 September 2013 Quarter-final	Cavan Gaels	2-8 – 1-8	Mullahoran	Breffni Park
20:00		Report		Referee: John Cassidy

21 September 2013 Quarter-final	Ballinagh	0-16 – 1-9	Lacken	Breffni Park
16:00		Report		Referee: Raymond Kelly

=== Semi finals ===
28 September 2013 Semi-final	Ballinagh	2-9 – 1-10	Crosserlough	Breffni Park
20:00		Report		Referee: Michael Lee

29 September 2013 Semi-final	Cavan Gaels	2-14 – 0-7	Castlerahan	Breffni Park
19:30				Referee: Joe McQuillan

=== Final ===
13 October 2013
16:00
Final

Ballinagh	0-12 – 0-11	Cavan Gaels
Niall McDermott 0-7 (0-7f), Damien McInerney 0-1, Pádraic O'Reilly 0-1, Niall O'Reilly 0-1, Thomas Moore 0-1, Terry Smith 0-1	Report	Martin Dunne 0-4 (0-3f), Seanie Johnston 0-3 (0-1f), Declan Meehan 0-2, Marc Leddy 0-1, Micheál Lyng 0-1

Breffni Park
Referee: Kieran McCarville

== Relegation play-offs ==
=== Preliminary relegation play-off ===
21 September 2013 Preliminary Relegation Play-Off	Redhills	0-14 – 1-10	Drumalee	P. J. Duke Park
16:00				Referee: Ollie Donohoe

=== Semi finals ===
21 September 2013 Relegation Semi-final	Drumgoon	1-10 – 1-9	Denn	Lavey GAA Grounds
16:00				Referee: Harry Conaty

5 October 2013 Relegation Semi-final	Drumalee	5-7 – 1-10	Belturbet	First Ulster Park
15:00				Referee: James Clarke

=== Final ===
Relegation Final	Denn	w/o – conc	Belturbet
		Report
