= 2016 Cavan Senior Football Championship =

2016 Cavan SFC
Tournament details
- County: Cavan
- Province: Ulster
- Year: 2016
- Trophy: Oliver Plunkett Cup
- Sponsor: Hotel Kilmore
- Date: 5 August - 23 October 2016
- Teams: 16
- Defending champions: Kingscourt Stars

Winners
- Champions: Ramor United (4th win)
- Manager: Micheál McDermott
- Captain: Jack Brady; Damien Barkey
- Qualify for: 2016 Ulster Club SFC

Runners-up
- Runners-up: Castlerahan
- Manager: Michael Reilly
- Captain: Sean Brady

Promotion/Relegation
- Relegated team(s): Ballyhaise; Denn; Killeshandra

Other
- Player of the Year: Conor Bradley (Ramor United)

The 2016 Cavan Senior Football Championship was the 108th edition of Cavan GAA's premier club Gaelic football tournament for senior graded teams in County Cavan, Ireland. The tournament consists of 16 teams, with the winner going on to represent Cavan in the Ulster Senior Club Football Championship. The championship starts with a group stage and then progresses to a knock out stage. The draw for the group stages of the championship were made on 11 April 2016.

Kingscourt Stars were the defending champions, but were dethroned by Ramor United at the quarter-final stage.

The final was played on 9 October 2016, but the game ended in a draw. On 23 October 2016, Ramor United claimed their fourth title, beating Castlerahan after a replay and thus bridging a 24-year gap since their last triumph.

== Format ==
For the 2016 season the championship will take a Group stage progressing to a knock-out stage format rather than the back-door system used in previous years. The 16 clubs will be divided into 4 groups of 4 with 2 teams in each group to be seeded. The top 2 in each group progress to the quarter-finals while the bottom placed team in each group enter a Relegation Playoff with 3 teams to be relegated to the 2017 Intermediate Championship. This will leave 14 clubs to participate in the 2017 Senior Championship.

== Team changes ==
The following teams have changed division since the 2015 championship season.

=== To Championship ===
Promoted from 2015 Cavan Intermediate Football Championship

- Ballyhaise (Intermediate Champions)

=== From Championship ===
Relegated to 2016 Cavan Intermediate Football Championship

- Drumalee
- Drumgoon

== Group stage ==
All 16 teams enter the competition at this stage in 4 groups of 4. Two teams in each group are seeded. Seeds are determined by the 8 teams which reached the quarter-final the previous year. They are:

- Castlerahan
- Cavan Gaels
- Killeshandra
- Killygarry
- Kingscourt Stars
- Lacken
- Mullahoran
- Ramor United

The top 2 teams in each group go into the quarter-finals while the bottom team of each group will enter a Relegation Playoff.

=== Group A ===
Team	Pld	W	L	D	PF	PA	PD	Pts
Cootehill	3	2	1	0	38	33	+5	4
Lacken	3	1	1	1	37	40	-3	3
Cuchulainns	3	1	1	1	37	52	-15	3
Cavan Gaels	3	1	2	0	52	39	+13	2

Round 1

6 August 2016 Round 1	Cootehill	2-6 – 1-4	Lacken	Breffni Park
		Report

7 August 2016 Round 1	Cavan Gaels	4-14 – 0-9	Cuchulainns	Dolan Park

Round 2

13 August 2016 Round 2	Lacken	1-15 – 3-7	Cavan Gaels	Breffni Park
		Report

14 August 2016 Round 2	Cuchulainns	1-13 – 1-11	Cootehill	Lavey GAA Grounds

Round 3

20 August 2016 Round 3	Cootehill	2-6 – 0-10	Cavan Gaels	Breffni Park
		Report

21 August 2016 Round 3	Lacken	2-6 – 1-9	Cuchulainns	Breffni Park
		Report

Quarter-Final play-off:

28 August 2016 Quarter-final play-off	Lacken	1-13 – 0-12	Cuchulainns	St. Matthew's Park
		Report

=== Group B ===
Team	Pld	W	L	D	PF	PA	PD	Pts
Lavey	3	3	0	0	49	41	+8	6
Kingscourt Stars	3	2	1	0	63	31	+32	4
Crosserlough	3	0	2	1	37	46	-9	1
Killeshandra	3	0	2	1	36	67	-31	1

Round 1

7 August 2016 Round 1	Lavey	2-10 – 1-10	Kingscourt Stars	Breffni Park
		Report

7 August 2016 Round 1	Killeshandra	3-6 – 0-15	Crosserlough	Joe Crowe Park

Round 2

13 August 2016 Round 2	Kingscourt Stars	7-14 – 0-7	Killeshandra	Breffni Park
		Report

13 August 2016 Round 2	Lavey	0-16 – 1-11	Crosserlough	Dolan Park

Round 3

20 August 2016 Round 3	Lavey	1-14 – 2-8	Killeshandra	Breffni Park
		Report

21 August 2016 Round 3	Kingscourt Stars	1-12 – 0-8	Crosserlough	Dolan Park

Preliminary relegation play-off

2 September 2016 Preliminary relegation play-off	Crosserlough	0-15 – 2-5	Killeshandra	Our Lady of Lourdes Park

=== Group C ===
Team	Pld	W	L	D	PF	PA	PD	Pts
Castlerahan	3	3	0	0	57	39	+18	6
Gowna	3	2	1	0	40	32	+8	4
Killygarry	3	0	2	1	44	57	-13	1
Ballyhaise	3	0	2	1	37	50	-13	1

Round 1

7 August 2016 Round 1	Gowna	1-11 – 0-8	Killygarry	Breffni Park
		Report

7 August 2016 Round 1	Castlerahan	4-6 – 1-6	Ballyhaise	St. Matthew's Park

Round 2

12 August 2016 Round 2	Gowna	1-14 – 1-10	Ballyhaise	Breffni Park
		Report

14 August 2016 Round 2	Castlerahan	5-13 – 2-15	Killygarry	St. Matthew's Park

Round 3

19 August 2016 Round 3	Castlerahan	0-11 – 0-9	Gowna	Our Lady of Lourdes Park

20 August 2016 Round 3	Killygarry	0-15 – 1-12	Ballyhaise	St. Felim's Park

Preliminary relegation play-off

4 September 2016 Preliminary relegation play-off	Killygarry	2-15 – 1-10	Ballyhaise	Ballinagh GAA Grounds

=== Group D ===
Team	Pld	W	L	D	PF	PA	PD	Pts
Ramor United	3	3	0	0	70	25	+45	6
Mullahoran	3	2	1	0	46	43	+3	4
Ballinagh	3	1	2	0	41	45	-4	2
Denn	3	0	3	0	28	72	-44	0

Round 1

5 August 2016 Round 1	Ramor United	4-18 – 1-6	Denn	Breffni Park
		Report

7 August 2016 Round 1	Mullahoran	1-12 – 0-14	Ballinagh	Breffni Park
		Report

Round 2

14 August 2016 Round 2	Ramor United	2-15 – 0-7	Mullahoran	Breffni Park
		Report

14 August 2016 Round 2	Ballinagh	1-15 – 2-5	Denn	Dr. Plunkett Memorial Park

Round 3

21 August 2016 Round 3	Ramor United	2-13 – 0-9	Ballinagh	Lavey GAA Grounds

25 August 2016 Round 3	Mullahoran	3-15 – 2-2	Denn	Edwin Carolan Community Park
		Report

== Knock-Out Stages ==
Quarter-finals
Ramor United	1-8
Kingscourt Stars	0-7
Lavey	0-13
Mullahoran	0-9
Castlerahan	1-10; 2-11 (R)
Lacken	1-10; 0-16 (R)
Gowna	1-13; 0-18 (R)
Cootehill	0-16; 0-13 (R)

Semi-finals
Ramor United	2-10
Lavey	1-10
Castlerahan	3-9
Gowna	1-10

Final
Ramor United	2-11; 0-10 (R)
Castlerahan	3-8; 0-8 (R)

=== Quarter-finals ===
9 September 2016 Quarter-final	Lavey	0-13 – 0-9	Mullahoran	Breffni Park
20:15	Shane Tierney 0-3, Karl Duke 0-3 (0-1f), Chris Conroy 0-3 (0-2f), Ray Cullivan 0-2 (0-1f), Paul Gilcreest 0-1, Darren Jordan 0-1	Report	Enda O'Reilly 0-3, Paul Brady 0-1, Philip Brady 0-1 (0-1f), Niall McGahern 0-1, Raymond Lynch 0-1, Shane Sheils 0-1, Fionnan O'Reilly 0-1	Referee: Michael Lee

10 September 2016 Quarter-final	Castlerahan	1-10 – 1-10	Lacken	Breffni Park
20:00	Cian Mackey 0-4 (0-3f), Cian McEnroe 1-1, Cormac Daly 0-2, Fiachra Sweeney 0-1, Fergal Reilly 0-1, Shane McSweeney 0-1	Report	Niall McKiernan 1-2 (1-0 pen), Raymond Galligan 0-4 (0-2f), Declan Brady 0-1, Craig Lanauze 0-1, Conor Finnegan 0-1, Stephen Brady 0-1	Referee: Joe McQuillan

11 September 2016 Quarter-final	Ramor United	1-8 – 0-7	Kingscourt Stars	Breffni Park
15:30	Simon Cadden 1-0, Cathal Maguire 0-2, Conor Bradley 0-2 (0-2f), James Brady 0-2, Kevin Mulvany 0-2	Report	Barry Reilly 0-3 (0-3f), Alan Clarke 0-1, Christy McGowan 0-1, Joe Dillon 0-1, Peter Corrigan 0-1	Referee: Conor Dourneen

11 September 2016 Quarter-final	Cootehill	0-16 – 1-13	Gowna	Breffni Park
19:30	Enda Hessin 0-9 (0-4f), John McCutcheon 0-3 (0-1f), Colm Smith 0-2 (0-1f), John Carney 0-1, Damien Sherlock 0-1	Report	Gerald Pearson 0-5 (0-2f), Robbie Fitzpatrick 0-5 (0-3f), T. J. Fitzpatrick 1-0 (1-0 pen), Conor Madden 0-2, John Hyland 0-1	Referee: James Clarke

17 September 2016 Quarter-final Replay	Castlerahan	2-11 – 0-16	Lacken	Our Lady of Lourdes Park
17:00	Cian Mackey 1-4 (0-2f), Dan Lynch 1-0, Sean Brady 0-2, Shane McSweeney 0-2, David Wright 0-1, Cian McEnroe 0-1 (0-1f), Enda Flanagan 0-1	Report	Raymond Galligan 0-7 (0-3f, 1 '45), Niall McKiernan 0-4 (0-1f), Paul Leddy 0-3, Stephen Brady 0-1, David Wilson 0-1	Referee: Pat Clarke

17 September 2016 Quarter-final Replay	Gowna	0-18 – 0-13	Cootehill	Dolan Park
17:00	Gerald Pearson 0-6, Conor Madden 0-3, Cian Bannon 0-2, Shane Briody 0-2, Mark McKeever 0-1, Niall Madden 0-1, David Hyland 0-1, Robbie Fitzpatrick 0-1, T. J. Fitzpatrick 0-1	Report	Colm Smith 0-6, Enda Hessin 0-4, Glen Nulty 0-2, Eoin Roche 0-1	Referee: John Emmo

=== Semi-finals ===
24 September 2016 Semi-final	Ramor United	2-10 – 1-10	Lavey	Breffni Park
18:30	Jack Brady 1-1, James Brady 0-3, Kevin Mulvany 1-0, Mark Magee 0-1, Eoin Somerville 0-1, Cathal Maguire 0-1, Conor Bradley 0-1 (0-1f), Adrian Cole 0-1, Killian Maguire 0-1	Report av av	Chris Conroy 1-3 (0-3f), Paul Gilcreest 0-3, Ray Cullivan 0-2, Gerard Smith 0-1, Darren Jordan 0-1	Referee: Padraig Sheridan

24 September 2016 Semi-final	Castlerahan	3-9 – 1-10	Gowna	Breffni Park
20:00	Paul Brady 1-1, Enda Flanagan 1-1, Cian Mackey 0-3 (0-2f), David Wright 1-0, Cian McEnroe 0-2 (0-2f), Fergal Reilly 0-1, Daniel Lynch 0-1	Report av av	Conor Madden 0-5 (0-1 '45), T. J. Fitzpatrick 1-1 (0-1f), David Hyland 0-1, Robbie Fitzpatrick 0-1, Gerald Pearson 0-1 (0-1f), Aaron Brady 0-1	Referee: Chris McCaffrey

=== Final ===
9 October 2016
16:00
Final

Castlerahan	3-8 – 2-11	Ramor United
Cian Mackey 0-5 (0-4f), Sean Brady 1-0, Oisin O'Connell 1-0, Paul Brady 1-0, Shane McSweeney 0-2, Brian Coleman 0-1	Report av av	Adrian Cole 1-2, James Brady 1-1, Kevin Mulvany 0-2 (0-1 '45), C. Bradley 0-2 (0-1f), James Bradley 0-2, Brían O'Connell 0-1, Cathal Maguire 0-1

Breffni Park
Attendance: 8,661
Referee: Michael Lee

23 October 2016
15:00
Final replay

Ramor United	0-10 – 0-8	Castlerahan
Adrian Cole 0-4, Conor Bradley 0-3 (0-2f), Cathal Maguire 0-1, Jack Brady 0-1, Killian Maguire 0-1 (0-1f)	Report av av	Cian Mackey 0-4 (0-1f), Stephen Cooney 0-2, Cian McEnroe 0-2 (0-1f)

Breffni Park
Attendance: 4,410
Referee: Noel Mooney

== Relegation play-offs ==
=== Relegation Semi-Finals ===
The bottom placed team in each group play each other. The 2 winners will progress to the Relegation Final while the 2 losers will be relegated to the 2017 Intermediate Championship.

8 October 2016 Relegation Semi-final	Cavan Gaels	8-17 – 0-9	Denn	Ballinagh GAA Grounds
16:30

8 October 2016 Relegation Semi-final	Ballyhaise	5-14 – 3-11	Killeshandra	First Ulster Park
16:30

=== Relegation Final ===
The 2 winners of the Relegation Round 1 play each other. The winner retains their Senior status for 2017 while the loser will be relegated to the 2017 Intermediate Championship.

15 October 2016 Relegation Final	Cavan Gaels	0-13 – 1-4	Ballyhaise	Packie Devlin Park
16:30				Referee: Pat Clarke
