= 2020 Cavan Senior Football Championship =

2020 Cavan SFC
Tournament details
- County: Cavan
- Province: Ulster
- Year: 2020
- Trophy: Oliver Plunkett Cup
- Sponsor: Hotel Kilmore
- Date: 1 August - 26 September 2020
- Teams: 12
- Defending champions: Castlerahan

Winners
- Champions: Crosserlough (10th win)
- Manager: Jimmy Higgins
- Captain: Pierce Smith

Runners-up
- Runners-up: Kingscourt Stars
- Manager: David Lennon
- Captain: Padraig Faulkner

Promotion/Relegation
- Relegated team(s): No relegation

The 2020 Cavan Senior Football Championship was the 111th edition of Cavan GAA's premier gaelic football tournament for senior graded clubs in County Cavan, Ireland. The tournament consists of 12 teams, with the winner not representing Cavan in the Ulster Senior Club Football Championship, due to the latter competition's cancellation.

The championship starts with a league stage and then progresses to a knock out stage. The COVID-19 pandemic brought forward the beginning and end dates for the championship but the format was not changed, although there was no relegation this year.

Castlerahan were the defending champions after they defeated Ramor United in the previous years final to claim their second title in a row. However they were defeated by Crosserlough at the semi-final stage.

Crosserlough and Kingscourt Stars contested the final on 26 September but it ended as a draw. Crosserlough won the replay to win their first title in 48 years.

The drawn final was the first Cavan final to be shown live on RTÉ television.

== Team changes ==
The following teams have changed division since the 2019 championship season.

=== To Championship ===
Promoted from 2019 Cavan Intermediate Football Championship

- Laragh United - (Intermediate Champions)

=== From Championship ===
Relegated to 2020 Cavan Intermediate Football Championship

- Cootehill Celtic

== League stage ==
All 12 teams enter the competition at this stage. A random draw determines which teams face each other in each of the four rounds. No team can meet each other twice in the group stage. The top 8 teams go into a seeded draw for the quarter-finals.

Pos	Team	Pld	W	D	L	PF	PA	PD	Pts	Qualification or relegation
1	Kingscourt Stars	4	4	0	0	80	49	+31	8	Advance to quarter-final
2	Crosserlough	4	4	0	0	77	52	+25	8	Advance to quarter-final
3	Castlerahan	4	3	1	0	77	55	+22	7	Advance to quarter-final
4	Ramor United	4	3	0	1	67	55	+12	6	Advance to quarter-final
5	Cavan Gaels	4	3	0	1	67	52	+15	6	Advance to quarter-final
6	Lavey	4	2	1	1	62	61	+1	5	Advance to quarter-final
7	Gowna	4	1	2	1	67	69	−2	4	Advance to quarter-final
8	Mullahoran	4	1	0	3	56	67	−11	2	Advance to quarter-final
9	Killygarry	4	0	1	3	59	63	−4	1	
10	Lacken Celtic	4	0	1	3	55	77	−22	1	
11	Shercock	4	0	0	4	43	71	−28	0	
12	Laragh United	4	0	0	4	45	84	−39	0	

Source: Cavan GAA

=== Round 1 ===
1 August 2020 Round 1	Kingscourt Stars	1-13 – 0-10	Lacken	Lavey GAA Grounds
17:00				Referee: Pat Clarke

1 August 2020 Round 1	Killygarry	0-12 – 1-10	Cavan Gaels	Breffni Park
19:30		Report		Referee: Conor Dourneen

2 August 2020 Round 1	Gowna	1-11 – 2-11	Ramor United	Breffni Park
14:00				Referee: Joe McQuillan

2 August 2020 Round 1	Mullahoran	3-15 – 0-9	Laragh United	St. Matthew's Park
17:00				Referee: Stephen McKiernan

2 August 2020 Round 1	Crosserlough	1-14 – 0-7	Lavey	Breffni Park
19:30				Referee: Oliver Óg O'Reilly

5 August 2020 Round 1	Castlerahan	1-18 – 0-9	Shercock	Edwin Carolan Community Park
20:00		Report		Referee: Michael Lee

=== Round 2 ===
7 August 2020 Round 2	Killygarry	0-17 – 2-13	Kingscourt Stars	Breffni Park
20:15				Referee: Joe McQuillan

8 August 2020 Round 2	Gowna	0-18 – 1-15	Lavey	Dr. Plunkett Memorial Park
17:00		Report		Referee: Conor Dourneen

8 August 2020 Round 2	Cavan Gaels	1-20 – 1-4	Mullahoran	Breffni Park
19:30				Referee: Pat Clarke

9 August 2020 Round 2	Crosserlough	1-13 – 1-10	Laragh United	Breffni Park
14:00				Referee: Chris McCaffrey

9 August 2020 Round 2	Shercock	0-10 – 1-9	Ramor United	Jim Smith Park
17:00				Referee: Brendan Sweeney

9 August 2020 Round 2	Castlerahan	4-12 – 1-15	Lacken Celtic	Breffni Park
19:30				Referee: Barry McMenamin

=== Round 3 ===
14 August 2020 Round 3	Kingscourt Stars	3-15 – 1-7	Laragh United	Edwin Carolan Community Park
20:15				Referee: Kieran McCarville

14 August 2020 Round 3	Mullahoran	0-11 – 0-15	Castlerahan	Breffni Park
20:15				Referee: Ollie Donohoe

15 August 2020 Round 3	Cavan Gaels	0-11 – 2-14	Ramor United	St. Matthew's Park
17:00		Report		Referee: Conor Dourneen

15 August 2020 Round 3	Lacken	0-14 – 3-15	Crosserlough	Sheelin Park
17:00				Referee: Michael Lee

15 August 2020 Round 3	Shercock	0-12 – 1-14	Lavey	Breffni Park
19:00				Referee: Padraig Sheridan

16 August 2020 Round 3	Killygarry	2-11 – 2-12	Gowna	Páirc Naomh Fionnán
14:00		Report		Referee: Martin Sexton

=== Round 4 ===
22 August 2020 Round 4	Gowna	2-11 – 1-14	Castlerahan	Sheelin Park
16:00				Referee: Brendan Sweeney

22 August 2020 Round 4	Ramor United	3-10 – 3-12	Crosserlough	St. Matthew's Park
16:00		Report		Referee: James Clarke

22 August 2020 Round 4	Mullahoran	0-14 – 1-17	Lavey	St. Felim's Park
16:00				Referee: Joe McQuillan

22 August 2020 Round 4	Lacken Celtic	2-7 – 0-13	Killygarry	Breffni Park
16:00				Referee: Tony Gregory

22 August 2020 Round 4	Kingscourt Stars	3-12 – 0-12	Shercock	St. Anne's Park
16:00				Referee: John Emmo

22 August 2020 Round 4	Laragh United	0-13 – 2-14	Cavan Gaels	Páirc Emmet
16:00				Referee: Harry Conaty

== Knock-Out Stage ==
Quarter-finals
Castlerahan	3-13
Lavey	0-21
Crosserlough	2-19
Gowna	3-10
Ramor United	0-15
Cavan Gaels	2-19
Kingscourt Stars	0-22
Mullahoran	2-15

Semi-finals
Castlerahan	0-16
Crosserlough	2-16
Cavan Gaels	0-10
Kingscourt Stars	2-12

Final
Crosserlough	2-12; 0-13 (R)
Kingscourt Stars	2-12; 0-8 (R)

=== Quarter-finals ===
28 August 2020 Quarter-final	Ramor United	0-15 – 2-19	Cavan Gaels	Breffni Park
20:15		Report		Referee: Conor Dourneen

29 August 2020 Quarter-final	Castlerahan	3-13 – 0-21 (a.e.t.)	Lavey	Breffni Park
18:30		Report		Referee: Oliver Óg O'Reilly

30 August 2020 Quarter-final	Kingscourt Stars	0-22 – 2-15 (a.e.t.)	Mullahoran	Breffni Park
16:15				Referee: Michael Lee

30 August 2020 Quarter-final	Crosserlough	2-19 – 3-10	Gowna	Breffni Park
18:30				Referee: Pat Clarke

=== Semi-finals ===
20 September 2020 Semi-final	Castlerahan	0-16 – 2-16 (a.e.t.)	Crosserlough	Breffni Park
14:30				Referee: Joe McQuillan

20 September 2020 Semi-final	Cavan Gaels	0-10 – 2-12	Kingscourt Stars	Breffni Park
19:30				Referee: Pat Clarke

=== Final ===
26 September 2020
19:15
Final

Crosserlough	2-12 – 2-12	Kingscourt Stars
Patrick Lynch 0-6 (0-3f, 0-3m), Adrian Smith 1-1, Cian Boylan 1-0, James Smith 0-1, Brandon Boylan 0-1 (0-1m), Stephen Smith 0-1, David Shalvey 0-1, Mark Stuart 0-1	Report	Barry Reilly 0-7 (0-5f), Kevin Curtis 1-1 (0-1m), Padraig Faulkner 1-0, Peter Corrigan 0-1, Barry Tully 0-1, Philip Tinnelly 0-1, Cian Shekleton 0-1 (0-1f)

Breffni Park
Attendance: 200
Referee: Conor Dourneen

3 October 2020
17:00
Final replay

Crosserlough	0-13 – 0-8	Kingscourt Stars
Patrick Lynch 0-5 (0-2f, 0-1m, 0-1 '45), James Smith 0-3, David Shalvey 0-2, Stephen Smith 0-2, Mark Stuart 0-1	Report	Padraig Faulkner 0-3, Barry Reilly 0-2 (0-2f), Cian Shekleton 0-2, Barry Tully 0-1

Breffni Park
Referee: Oliver Óg O'Reilly
