= 2017 Cavan Senior Football Championship =

2017 Cavan SFC
Tournament details
- County: Cavan
- Province: Ulster
- Year: 2017
- Trophy: Oliver Plunkett Cup
- Sponsor: Hotel Kilmore
- Date: 23 July - 8 October 2017
- Teams: 14
- Defending champions: Ramor United

Winners
- Champions: Cavan Gaels (14th win)
- Manager: Jason O'Reilly
- Captain: Micheál Lyng
- Qualify for: 2017 Ulster Club SFC

Runners-up
- Runners-up: Castlerahan
- Manager: Donal Keogan
- Captain: Ronan Flanagan

Promotion/Relegation
- Relegated team(s): Arva; Cuchulainns; Mullahoran

Other
- Player of the Year: Seánie Johnston (Cavan Gaels)

The 2017 Cavan Senior Football Championship was the 109th edition of Cavan GAA's premier gaelic football tournament for senior graded clubs in County Cavan, Ireland. The tournament consisted of 14 teams, with the winner representing Cavan in the Ulster Senior Club Football Championship.

The championship starts with a league stage and then progresses to a knock out stage. The draw for the group stages of the championship were made on 10 April 2017.

Ramor United were the defending champions after they defeated neighbours Castlerahan in the previous years final, however Castlerahan exacted their revenge when dethroning them at the semi-final stage.

Cavan Gaels regained their title, defeating Castlerahan by 0-13 to 0-8 in the final. This was their 14th win, and also their 10th in 20 years.

== Team changes ==
The following teams had changed division since the 2016 championship season:

=== To Championship ===
Promoted from 2016 Cavan Intermediate Football Championship

- Arva - (Intermediate Champions)

=== From Championship ===
Relegated to 2017 Cavan Intermediate Football Championship

- Ballyhaise
- Denn
- Killeshandra

== League stage ==
All 14 teams enter the competition at this stage. A random draw determines which teams face each other in each of the four rounds. No team can meet each other twice in the group stage. The top 8 teams go into a random unseeded draw for the quarter-finals while the bottom 6 teams will enter a Relegation Playoff. If teams are level on points and a place in the quarter-final is at stake, a Playoff will be conducted to determine who goes through.

Pos	Team	Pld	W	D	L	PF	PA	PD	Pts	Qualification or relegation
1	Cavan Gaels	4	3	1	0	79	50	+29	7	Advance to quarter-final
2	Castlerahan	4	3	1	0	59	50	+9	7	Advance to quarter-final
3	Killygarry	4	3	0	1	71	49	+22	6	Advance to quarter-final
4	Ramor United	4	3	0	1	75	63	+12	6	Advance to quarter-final
5	Lavey	4	1	3	0	65	64	+1	5	Advance to quarter-final
6	Kingscourt Stars (O, Q)	4	2	0	2	67	59	+8	4	Advance to quarter-final
7	Ballinagh (O, R)	4	2	0	2	62	54	+8	4	Advance to quarter-final
8	Cootehill (O, Q)	4	1	2	1	56	53	+3	4	Advance to quarter-final
9	Crosserlough (O, Q)	4	2	0	2	68	70	−2	4	Advance to relegation play-offs
10	Gowna	4	1	1	2	56	62	−6	3	Advance to relegation play-offs
11	Lacken	4	1	1	2	48	58	−10	3	Advance to relegation play-offs
12	Cuchulainns	4	1	0	3	73	78	−5	2	Advance to relegation play-offs
13	Arva	4	0	1	3	47	85	−38	1	Advance to relegation play-offs
14	Mullahoran	4	0	0	4	43	74	−31	0	Advance to relegation play-offs

Source: Cavan GAA
(O) Play-off; (Q) Winner of play-off, advance to quarter-final; (R) Loser of play-off, advance to relegation play-off

=== Round 1 ===
28 July 2017 Round 1	Ramor United	1-13 – 1-12	Cuchulainns	O'Raghallaigh Park
				Referee: Conor Dourneen

28 July 2017 Round 1	Cavan Gaels	1-14 – 2-7	Lacken	Breffni Park
				Referee: Kieran McCarville

29 July 2017 Round 1	Lavey	2-9 – 1-12	Cootehill	Breffni Park
		Report		Referee: Jim Giblin

29 July 2017 Round 1	Castlerahan	0-16 – 0-13	Arva	Breffni Park
		Report		Referee: Noel Mooney

30 July 2017 Round 1	Killygarry	2-9 – 0-9	Gowna	Breffni Park
		Report		Referee: John Emmo

30 July 2017 Round 1	Kingscourt Stars	1-15 – 0-4	Mullahoran	Breffni Park
		Report		Referee: Martin Sexton

30 July 2017 Round 1	Crosserlough	2-13 – 1-13	Ballinagh	Breffni Park
		Report		Referee: Tony Gregory

=== Round 2 ===
4 August 2017 Round 2	Cavan Gaels	3-15 – 0-9	Arva	Ballinagh GAA Grounds
				Referee: Conor Dourneen

4 August 2017 Round 2	Castlerahan	2-8 – 2-8	Lavey	Breffni Park
		Report		Referee: Gerry Sheridan

5 August 2017 Round 2	Cuchulainns	2-12 – 3-14	Killygarry	St. Matthew's Park
				Referee: Harry Conaty

5 August 2017 Round 2	Ramor United	2-12 – 2-11	Kingscourt Stars	Breffni Park
		Report		Referee: Margaret Farrelly

6 August 2017 Round 2	Crosserlough	0-12 – 2-13	Gowna	Breffni Park
				Referee: Pat Clarke

6 August 2017 Round 2	Mullahoran	0-8 – 0-13	Cootehill	Breffni Park
				Referee: Michael Lee

6 August 2017 Round 2	Lacken	1-7 – 2-11	Ballinagh	Breffni Park
		Report		Referee: James Clarke

=== Round 3 ===
11 August 2017 Round 3	Ramor United	1-7 – 2-14	Cavan Gaels	Breffni Park
		Report		Referee: Michael Lee

12 August 2017 Round 3	Killygarry	2-8 – 0-15	Lacken	Ballinagh GAA Grounds
				Referee: Conor Dourneen

12 August 2017 Round 3	Cootehill	2-11 – 3-10	Cuchulainns	O'Raghallaigh Park
				Referee: Padraig Sheridan

12 August 2017 Round 3	Arva	1-11 – 0-14	Lavey	Breffni Park
				Referee: Martin Sexton

13 August 2017 Round 3	Kingscourt Stars	3-16 – 2-12	Gowna	Dolan Park
				Referee: Joey Curley

13 August 2017 Round 3	Ballinagh	1-6 – 1-11	Castlerahan	Breffni Park
				Referee: Margaret Farrelly

13 August 2017 Round 3	Crosserlough	2-17 – 1-17	Mullahoran	Sheelin Park
				Referee: Ollie Donohoe

=== Round 4 ===
26 August 2017 Round 4	Cootehill	2-5 – 0-11	Cavan Gaels	P. J. Duke Park
				Referee: Oliver Óg O'Reilly

26 August 2017 Round 4	Arva	0-11 – 4-19	Ramor United	Sheelin Park
				Referee: Padraig Sheridan

26 August 2017 Round 4	Crosserlough	0-14 – 0-15	Castlerahan	St. Matthew's Park
				Referee: Joe McQuillan

26 August 2017 Round 4	Gowna	0-10 – 0-10	Lacken	Páirc Naomh Fionnán
				Referee: Noel Mooney

26 August 2017 Round 4	Mullahoran	0-11 – 1-17	Ballinagh	Packie Devlin Park
				Referee: Stephen McKiernan

26 August 2017 Round 4	Kingscourt Stars	0-7 – 1-16	Killygarry	St. Anne's Park
				Referee: James Clarke

26 August 2017 Round 4	Lavey	2-16 – 1-18	Cuchulainns	Jim Smith Park
				Referee: Michael Lee

== League play-offs ==
=== Quarter-Final play-offs ===
2 September 2017 Quarter-final play-off	Cootehill	4-10 – 0-22 (a.e.t.)	Ballinagh	Breffni Park
		Report		Referee: John Emmo

3 September 2017 Quarter-final play-off	Crosserlough	2-12 – 3-12	Kingscourt Stars	Breffni Park
				Referee: Kieran McCarville

6 September 2017 Quarter-final play-off replay	Ballinagh	0-11 – 3-12	Cootehill	Breffni Park
		Report		Referee: Noel Mooney

=== Quarter-Final/Relegation play-off ===
10 September 2017 Quarter-final/Relegation play-off	Ballinagh	0-9 – 2-13	Crosserlough	St. Matthew's Park
				Referee: James Clarke

== Knock-Out Stage ==
Quarter-finals
Castlerahan	0-18
Cootehill	0-12
Ramor United	3-9
Lavey	1-11
Cavan Gaels	1-14
Crosserlough	3-6
Killygarry	0-12
Kingscourt Stars	1-10

Semi-finals
Castlerahan	0-10
Ramor United	0-9
Cavan Gaels	2-10
Kingscourt Stars	0-8

Final
Castlerahan	0-8
Cavan Gaels	0-13

=== Quarter-finals ===
9 September 2017 Quarter-final	Killygarry	0-12 – 1-10	Kingscourt Stars	Breffni Park
		Report		Referee: Martin Sexton

10 September 2017 Quarter-final	Ramor United	3-9 – 1-11	Lavey	Breffni Park
		Report		Referee: Conor Dourneen

16 September 2017 Quarter-final	Castlerahan	0-18 – 0-12	Cootehill	Lavey GAA Grounds
				Referee: Margaret Farrelly

16 September 2017 Quarter-final	Cavan Gaels	1-14 – 3-6	Crosserlough	Páirc Naomh Fionnán
				Referee: Kieran McCarville

=== Semi-finals ===
23 September 2017 Semi-final	Castlerahan	0-10 – 0-9	Ramor United	Breffni Park
	Cian Mackey 0-6 (0-2f), Stephen Cooney 0-1, Cormac Daly 0-1, Cian McEnroe 0-1, Sean Brady 0-1	Report av	Stephen Monaghan 0-3 (0-1f), Cathal Maguire 0-1, James Brady 0-1, Adrian Cole 0-1, Jack Brady 0-1, Simon Cadden 0-1, Kevin Mulvany 0-1	Referee: Michael Lee

24 September 2017 Semi-final	Cavan Gaels	2-10 – 0-8	Kingscourt Stars	Breffni Park
	Paul O'Connor 2-0, Seanie Johnston 0-4 (0-1f), Martin Dunne 0-3 (0-1f, 0-1 '45), Micheál Lyng 0-2, Niall Smith 0-1	Report av	Barry Reilly 0-4 (0-4f), Padraig Faulkner 0-1, Alan Clarke 0-1 (0-1f), Philip Tinnelly 0-1, Cian McArdle 0-1	Referee: Margaret Farrelly

=== Final ===
8 October 2017
Final

Castlerahan	0-8 – 0-13	Cavan Gaels
Oisin Kiernan 0-2 (0-1 '45), Paul Smith 0-1, Cormac Daly 0-1, Sean Brady 0-1, Cian Mackey 0-1 (0-1f), Oisin O'Connell 0-1, Cian McEnroe 0-1 (0-1f)	Report av av	Seanie Johnston 0-5 (0-2f), Robert Maloney-Derham 0-2, Niall Smith 0-2, Martin Dunne 0-2 (0-1f), Barry Fortune 0-1, Declan Meehan 0-1

Breffni Park
Attendance: 4,000
Referee: Gerry Sheridan

== Relegation play-offs ==
The 6 bottom placed teams the league phase will play off against each other. The 3 winners will maintain their senior status for 2018 while the 3 losers will be relegated to the 2018 Intermediate Championship.

10 September 2017 Relegation play-off	Gowna	2-8 – 0-7	Arva	Joe Crowe Park
				Referee: Kieran McCarville

16 September 2017 Relegation play-off	Lacken	3-15 – 1-10	Cuchulainns	St. Matthew's Park
				Referee: Brendan Sweeney

23 September 2017 Relegation play-off	Ballinagh	2-14 – 1-14 (a.e.t.)	Mullahoran	Gowna GAA Grounds
				Referee: James Clarke
