= 2017 Ulster Senior Club Football Championship =

2017 Ulster Club Senior Football Championship
Tournament details
- Province: Ulster
- Year: 2017
- Trophy: Seamus McFerran Cup
- Sponsor: AIB GAA
- Date: 15 October - 26 November 2017
- Teams: 9 (one from each of the 9 counties)
- Defending champions: Slaughtneil

Winners
- Champions: Slaughtneil (3rd win)
- Manager: Mickey Moran
- Captain: Patsy Bradley
- Qualify for: All-Ireland Club SFC

Runners-up
- Runners-up: Cavan Gaels
- Manager: Jason O'Reilly
- Captain: Micheál Lyng

Other
- Matches played: 9
- Total scored: 17-213
- Top Scorer: Shane McGuigan (Slaughtneil) (1-17)
- Website: Ulster GAA

The 2017 AIB GAA Football Ulster Senior Club Championship was the 50th instalment of the annual competition organised by Ulster GAA. It was one of the four provincial competitions of the 2017–18 All-Ireland Senior Club Football Championship.

Slaughtneil from Derry were the defending champions, having beaten Kilcoo from Down in the 2016 final.

Slaughtneil successfully defended their title after defeating Cavan champions Cavan Gaels to claim their third title in four years.

== Teams ==
The Ulster championship is contested by the winners of the nine county championships in the Irish province of Ulster. Ulster comprises the six counties of Northern Ireland, as well as Cavan, Donegal and Monaghan in the Republic of Ireland.

County	Team	Last win
Antrim	Lámh Dhearg	
Armagh	Armagh Harps	
Cavan	Cavan Gaels	
Derry	Slaughtneil	2016
Donegal	Cill Chartha	
Down	Kilcoo	
Fermanagh	Derrygonnelly Harps	
Monaghan	Scotstown	1989
Tyrone	Omagh St Enda's	

== Bracket ==
Preliminary round
Kilcoo (Down)	0-12
Slaughtneil (Derry)	1-11

Quarter-Final
Scotstown (Monaghan)	1-6
Cill Chartha (Donegal)	1-16
Slaughtneil (Derry)	0-10
Omagh St Enda's (Tyrone)	0-8
Cavan Gaels (Cavan)	1-19
Lámh Dhearg (Antrim)	0-10
Derrygonnelly Harps (Fermanagh)	2-8
Armagh Harps (Armagh)	1-8

Semi-Final
Cill Chartha (Donegal)	0-17
Slaughtneil (Derry)	2-17
Cavan Gaels (Cavan)	0-12 (aet); 5-7 (R)
Derrygonnelly Harps (Fermanagh)	0-12 (aet); 2-15 (R)

Final
Slaughtneil (Derry)	1-15
Cavan Gaels (Cavan)	0-10

== Preliminary round ==
15 October 2017
14:30 GMT (UTC+0)
Preliminary round

Kilcoo (Down)	0-12 – 1-11	Slaughtneil (Derry)
Paul Devlin 0-5 (0-2f, 0-1 45), Darragh O’Hanlon 0-4 (0-4 f), Ceilum Doherty 0-1, JJ McLoughlin 0-1	Report	Shane McGuigan 0-4 (0-4f), Patsy Bradley 1-0, Christopher Bradley 0-2 (0-2f), Cormac O’Doherty 0-1, Meehaul McGrath 0-1, Padraig Cassidy 0-1, Sé McGuigan 0-1, Brendan Rogers 0-1

Páirc Esler, Newry
Referee: Niall Cullen (Fermanagh)

== Quarter-finals ==
28 October 2017
19:00 GMT (UTC+0)
Quarter-final

Derrygonnelly Harps (Fermanagh)	2-8 – 1-8	Armagh Harps (Armagh)
Conall Jones 1-5 (0-1f), Paul Ward 1-0 (1-0 pen), Garvan Jones 0-2, Stephen McGullion 0-1	Report	Ultan Lennon 1-2 (0-1f, 0-1 45), Gareth Swift 0-2 (0-1f), Mark McConville 0-1, Ryan McShane 0-1, Joe McElroy 0-1, Conor Murphy 0-1

Brewster Park, Enniskillen
Referee: Dan Mullan (Derry)

28 October 2017
19:00 GMT (UTC+0)
Quarter-final

Slaughtneil (Derry)	0-10 – 0-8	Omagh St Enda's (Tyrone)
Shane McGuigan 0-4 (0-4f), Christopher Bradley 0-4 (0-2f), Padraig Cassidy 0-1, Sé McGuigan 0-1	Report	Connor O'Donnell 0-2, Joe McMahon 0-1 (0-1f), Conan Grugan 0-1 (0-1f), Ronan O'Neill 0-1 (0-1f), Hugh Gallagher 0-1, Ciaran McLaughlin 0-1, Conor Clarke 0-1

Celtic Park, Derry
Referee: Noel Mooney (Cavan)

29 October 2017
14:30 GMT (UTC+0)
Quarter-final

Cavan Gaels (Cavan)	1-19 – 0-10	Lámh Dhearg (Antrim)
Martin Dunne 0-6 (0-1f), Seanie Johnston 0-5 (0-1f), Micheál Lyng 1-2, Robert Maloney-Derham 0-3, Levi Murphy 0-1, Barry Fortune 0-1, Daniel Graham 0-1	Report	Paddy Cunningham 0-6 (0-5f), Ryan Murray 0-3, Eoin McKeown 0-1

Breffni Park, Cavan
Referee: Barry Cassidy (Derry)

29 October 2017
14:30 GMT (UTC+0)
Quarter-final

Scotstown (Monaghan)	1-6 – 1-16	Cill Chartha (Donegal)
Conor McCarthy 1-2, Ross McKenna 0-2, Rory Beggan 0-1 (0-1f), Shane Carey 0-1	Report	Paddy McBrearty 0-8 (0-4f), Ryan McHugh 0-5 (0-2f), Eoin McHugh 1-0, Stephen McBrearty 0-1, Michael Hegarty 0-1, Ciaran McGinley 0-1

St Tiernach's Park, Clones
Referee: Ciaran Branagan (Down)

== Semi-finals ==
11 November 2017
18:30 GMT (UTC+0)
Semi-final

Cill Chartha (Donegal)	0-17 – 2-17	Slaughtneil (Derry)
Paddy McBrearty 0-10 (0-5f), Barry McGinley 0-1, Ciaran McGinley 0-1, Mark McHugh 0-1, Stephen McBrearty 0-1, Eoin McHugh 0-1, Andrew McClean 0-1, Matthew McClean 0-1	Report	Christopher Bradley 1-5 (0-1f, 0-1 45), Shane McGuigan 0-3 (0-1f), Sé McGuigan 1-0, Meehaul McGrath 0-2, Cormac O'Doherty 0-2, Brian Cassidy 0-2, Karl McKaigue 0-1, Chrissy McKaigue 0-1, Padraig Cassidy 0-1

Healy Park, Omagh
Referee: Sean Hurson (Tyrone)

12 November 2017
14:00 GMT (UTC+0)
Semi-final

Cavan Gaels (Cavan)	0-12 – 0-12 (a.e.t.)	Derrygonnelly Harps (Fermanagh)
Martin Dunne 0-4 (0-2f), Levi Murphy 0-2, Seanie Johnston 0-1 (0-1f), Niall Smith 0-1, Declan Meehan 0-1, Andrew Graham 0-1, Paul O'Connor 0-1, Darragh Sexton 0-1	Report	Paul Ward 0-5 (0-3f), Gary McKenna 0-2 (0-1f), Garvan Jones 0-2, Conall Jones 0-1 (0-1f), Ryan Jones 0-1, Declan Cassidy 0-1

St Tiernach's Park, Clones
Referee: Pádraig Hughes (Armagh)

19 November 2017
14:00 GMT (UTC+0)
Semi-final replay

Cavan Gaels (Cavan)	5-7 – 2-15	Derrygonnelly Harps (Fermanagh)
Paul O'Connor 3-0, Seanie Johnston 1-4 (0-2f), Barry Fortune 1-0, Kevin Meehan 0-2, Darragh Sexton 0-1	Report	Gary McKenna 0-5 (0-4f), Paul Ward 1-2, Conall Jones 1-0, Kevin Cassidy 0-3, Ryan Jones 0-2, Declan Cassidy 0-2, Michael Jones 0-1

St Tiernach's Park, Clones
Referee: Sean Laverty (Antrim)

== Final ==
26 November 2017
15:00 GMT (UTC+0)
Final

Slaughtneil (Down)	1-15 – 0-10	Cavan Gaels (Cavan)
Shane McGuigan 1-6 (0-4f), Christopher Bradley 0-3 (0-1f), Ronan Bradley 0-2, Brian Cassidy 0-2, Chrissy McKaigue 0-1, Sé McGuigan 0-1	Report	Martin Dunne 0-4, Seanie Johnston 0-3 (0-3f), Niall Murray 0-1, Stephen Murray 0-1, Niall Smith 0-1

Athletic Grounds, Armagh
Attendance: 7,591
Referee: Ciaran Branagan (Down)

== Championship statistics ==
=== Top scorers ===
Overall

Rank	Player	Club	Tally	Total	Matches	Average
1	Shane McGuigan	Slaughtneil	1-17	20	4	5.00
2	Paddy McBrearty	Cill Chartha	0-18	19	2	9.00
3	Christopher Bradley	Slaughtneil	1-14	17	4	4.25
4	Seánie Johnston	Cavan Gaels	1-13	16	4	4.00
5	Martin Dunne	Cavan Gaels	0-14	14	4	3.50
6	Paul Ward	Derrygonnelly Harps	2-7	13	3	4.33
7	Conall Jones	Derrygonnelly Harps	2-6	12	3	4.00
8	Paul O'Connor	Cavan Gaels	3-1	10	4	2.50
9	Gary McKenna	Derrygonnelly Harps	0-7	7	3	2.33
10	Sé McGuigan	Slaughtneil	1-3	6	4	1.50
10	Paddy Cunningham	Lámh Dhearg	0-6	6	1	6.00

In a single game

Rank	Player	Club	Tally	Total	Opposition
1	Paddy McBrearty	Cill Chartha	0-10	10	Slaughtneil
2	Paul O'Connor	Cavan Gaels	3-0	9	Derrygonnelly Harps
2	Shane McGuigan	Slaughtneil	1-6	9	Cavan Gaels
4	Christopher Bradley	Slaughtneil	1-5	8	Cill Chartha
4	Conall Jones	Derrygonnelly Harps	1-5	8	Armagh Harps
4	Paddy McBrearty	Cill Chartha	0-8	8	Scotstown
7	Seánie Johnston	Cavan Gaels	1-4	7	Derrygonnelly Harps
8	Martin Dunne	Cavan Gaels	0-6	6	Lámh Dhearg
8	Paddy Cunningham	Lámh Dhearg	0-6	6	Cavan Gaels
10	Ultan Lennon	Armagh Harps	1-2	5	Derrygonnelly Harps
10	Micheál Lyng	Cavan Gaels	1-2	5	Lámh Dhearg
10	Conor McCarthy	Scotstown	1-2	5	Cill Chartha
10	Paul Ward	Derrygonnelly Harps	1-2	5	Cavan Gaels
10	Paul Devlin	Kilcoo	0-5	5	Slaughtneil
10	Ryan McHugh	Cill Chartha	0-5	5	Scotstown
10	Seánie Johnston	Cavan Gaels	0-5	5	Lámh Dhearg
10	Paul Ward	Derrygonnelly Harps	0-5	5	Cavan Gaels
10	Gary McKenna	Derrygonnelly Harps	0-5	5	Cavan Gaels
