= Niall Murray (Gaelic footballer) =

Cavan Gaelic footballer (born 1990)

Personal information
- Native name: Niall Mac Muirí (Irish)
- Born: 1990 (age 35–36)
- Occupation: Financial Consultant
- Height: 5 ft 11 in (180 cm)

Sport
- Sport: Gaelic Football
- Position: Forward
Club
- Years: Club
- 2008–: Cavan Gaels
Club titles
- Cavan titles: 5
Inter-county
- Years: County
- 2011–2022: Cavan
Inter-county titles
- Ulster titles: 1

Niall Murray (born 1990) is an Irish Gaelic footballer for Cavan Gaels who previously played for the Cavan county team.

== Playing career ==
=== Club ===
Murray joined the Cavan Gaels senior panel in 2008. On 19 October 2008, Murray came on as a substitute as Cavan Gaels defeated Denn in the Cavan Senior Football Championship final, winning his first county title.

On 4 October 2009, Murray came on as a substitute in the county final as the Gaels defeated Denn for the second year in a row.

On 26 September 2010, Cavan Gaels faced Kingscourt Stars in the county final. Murray started at full forward as the Gaels fell to a four-point loss.

Cavan Gaels were back in the county final in 2011, facing Castlerahan on 2 October. Murray started as Cavan Gaels secured another senior championship.

On 13 October 2013, Murray was in the half back line as the Gaels returned to the county final, facing Ballinagh. Ballinagh were winners on a 0–12 to 0-11 scoreline.

On 11 October 2014, Cavan Gaels faced Kingscourt in another county final, with Murray starting in the full back line. A late Micheál Lyng point secured a one-point win for the Gaels, and Murray's fourth senior championship.

It would be 2017 before Cavan Gaels would reach the county final again. On 8 October, Murray was at full back as they faced Castlerahan, coming out five-point winners. The Gaels would later defeat Lámh Dhearg and Derrygonnelly to reach the Ulster Club final. On 26 November, Murray started at full back as Cavan Gaels faced Slaughtneil in the Ulster final. It was Slaughneil's day as they ran out comfortable winners.

=== Inter-county ===
==== Minor and under-21 ====
Murray first played for Cavan at minor level, however he had no success at this grade.

Murray later joined the Under-21 team. On 13 April 2011, Murray was at centre forward in the Ulster Final against Tyrone. A first-minute goal from Murray was decisive as Cavan were winners on a 1–10 to 0-10 scoreline.

Cavan defeated Wexford in the All-Ireland semi-final later that week to reach the final against Galway. On 1 May 2011, Murray started at centre forward in the All-Ireland final. Murray scored a point as Cavan fell to a 2–16 to 1–9 defeat.

==== Senior ====
Murray joined the senior squad after the under-21 success in 2011. On 12 June 2011, Murray made his championship debut at wing back in an Ulster quarter-final defeat by Donegal.

On 3 April 2016, Murray scored a point against Galway in the National League as Cavan earned promotion to the top flight for the first time in 15 years. On 24 April, Murray came off the bench in the Division 2 Final against Tyrone, with Tyrone winning by five points.

On 1 April 2018, Cavan faced Roscommon in the National League Division 2 Final. Murray came on as a substitute in the 4–16 to 4–12 loss.

On 18 May 2019, Murray was in the forward line for the Ulster quarter-final against Monaghan, and scored two points in the 1–13 to 0–12 win. Murray scored five point in both games against Armagh as Cavan reached the Ulster final. On 23 June 2019, Murray started the Ulster final as Cavan lost to Donegal.

In February 2020, it was announced that Murray had undergone surgery for a quad injury and would likely miss the rest of the 2020 season. On 18 October 2020, Murray came on as a substitute in a National League loss to Kildare, his first game for Cavan since his injury. Cavan would go on to reach the Ulster Final for the second consecutive year, facing Donegal on 22 November. Murray came on as a substitute as Cavan claimed their first provincial title in 23 years. Murray again came off the bench in the All-Ireland semi-final defeat to Dublin.

Cavan faced Tipperary in the National League Division 4 final on 2 April 2022. Murray came on as a late substitute in the one-point win. Murray was an unused substitute later that year as Cavan lost the Tailteann Cup Final to Westmeath.

Murray retired from inter-county football after the 2022 season, having made 93 senior appearances for his county in all competitions.

== Honours ==
Cavan

- Ulster Senior Football Championship (1): 2020
- National Football League Division 4 (1): 2022
- Ulster Under-21 Football Championship (1): 2011

Cavan Gaels

- Cavan Senior Football Championship (5): 2008, 2009, 2011, 2014, 2017
