= Martin Dunne (Gaelic footballer) =

Cavan Gaelic footballer (born 1989)

Personal information
- Native name: Máirtín Ó Doinn (Irish)
- Nickname: Dunnie
- Born: 22 January 1989 (age 37) County Cavan, Ireland
- Occupation: Accountant
- Height: 5 ft 10 in (178 cm)

Sport
- Sport: Gaelic football
- Position: Full Forward
Club
- Years: Club
- 2007–2021: Cavan Gaels
Club titles
- Cavan titles: 5
Inter-county
Years	County	Apps (scores)
2012–2015	Cavan	9 (1–36)
Inter-county titles
- Ulster titles: 0
- All Stars: 0

Martin Dunne (born 22 January 1989) is an Irish former Gaelic footballer who played for the Cavan Gaels club and the Cavan county team.

== Playing career ==
=== Club ===
Dunne played with Cavan Gaels from underage level, and progressed to the club's senior team.

Dunne did not feature in the Gaels county championship success in 2007, as he was playing with the club's minor team. He joined the senior team for their Ulster Club campaign. On 21 October, Dunne made his debut, scoring a point in the Gaels' preliminary round win over St Eunan's.

On 19 October 2008, Dunne came on as a substitute against Denn in his first Cavan Senior Football Championship final scoring a point in their 0-15 to 0-8 win.

Dunne started a county final for the first time in 2009, with the Gaels facing Denn for the second year in a row. Dunne scored two points as the Gaels had a comfortable win.

After surrendering their title to Kingscourt Stars in 2010, Cavan Gaels faced Castlerahan in the 2011 decider. Dunne top-scored with 1-4 from play as the Cavan town club reclaimed the senior crown.

On 13 October 2013, Dunne was at corner forward as the Gaels returned to the county final, facing Ballinagh. Dunne kicked four points but Ballinagh upset the odds to claim their first senior title.

Dunne was joint-captain of the Gaels in 2014, but didn't feature for much of the championship through injury. On 11 October, Dunne came on as a late substitute in the county final against Kingscourt. A late point from Micheál Lyng secured the title for the Gaels, while Dunne lifted the cup with joint-captain Eamonn Reilly after the game.

It would be 2017 before Cavan Gaels would reach the county final again. On 8 October, Dunne was in the full forward line as they faced Castlerahan, scoring 0-2 in their five-point win. The Gaels would later defeat Lámh Dhearg and Derrygonnelly to reach the Ulster Club final. On 26 November, Dunne was at corner forward as Cavan Gaels faced Slaughtneil in the Ulster final. Dunne top-scored for the Gaels with 0-4, but Slaughtneil were comfortable winners.

=== Inter-county ===
On 5 February 2012, Dunne made his National League debut, coming on as a substitute in a loss to Wexford. On 27 June, Dunne won a Leinster Junior Football Championship, scoring five points in the final win over Kildare.

Dunne made his championship debut on 19 May 2013, scoring nine points in Cavan's Ulster championship win over Armagh. Dunne kept his position for the rest of the year and Cavan exited the championship to Kerry at the quarter-final stage. Dunne finished the 2013 championship as the second highest scorer with 1–33, only beaten by Mayo's Cillian O'Connor. Dunne was nominated for an All-Star award at the end of the season.

On 27 April 2014, Dunne was at full forward as Cavan faced Roscommon in the National League Division 3 Final. Dunne scored 0-3 but had a penalty saved as Roscommon were winners on a 1-17 to 0-18 scoreline. Dunne was named in the Cavan team to face Armagh on 8 June 2014, but was unable to play, sustaining injuries during a mass brawl ahead of the game. Armagh went on to win by six points. Dunne suffered multiple breaks in his hand, and didn't feature for Cavan for the rest of the year.

On 24 June 2015, Dunne was a substitute as Cavan faced Monaghan in the Ulster championship. Dunne scored two points as Cavan lost out by a single point. On 4 July, Dunne scored a point from the bench in a qualifier loss to Roscommon. It was his last game for Cavan.

Dunne stepped away from the Cavan panel after the 2015 season.

== Managerial career ==
=== Drumlane ===
Dunne took his first managerial job ahead of the 2022 season, taking over Cavan Junior Football Championship club Drumlane. In his first year, Drumlane reached the Junior championship final. Drumlane won the championship after beating Arva in the final, a team they had lost by ten points to earlier in the championship. Following their county championship success, Dunne led the Sons of O'Connell to the final of the Ulster Junior Club Football Championship. Drumlane lost the final in a penalty shoot-out to Stewartstown Harps.

== Honours ==
=== Player ===
Cavan

- Leinster Junior Football Championship (1): 2012

Cavan Gaels

- Cavan Senior Football Championship (5): 2008, 2009, 2011, 2014 (c), 2017

Individual

- Irish News Ulster All-Star (1): 2013
- Gaelic Life Ulster Club All-Star (1): 2017

=== Manager ===
Drumlane

- Cavan Junior Football Championship (1): 2022
