= Cian Mackey =

Cavan Gaelic footballer

Personal information
- Native name: Cian Ó Maca (Irish)
- Born: 20 May 1987 (age 39)
- Height: 5 ft 10 in (178 cm)

Sport
- Sport: Gaelic Football
- Position: Forward
Clubs
- Years: Club
- –2019 2020–: Castlerahan; Mullinalaghta St Columba's
Club titles
- Cavan titles: 2 (+ 1 Longford)
Inter-county
- Years: County
- 2005–2019: Cavan
Inter-county titles
- Ulster titles: 0

Cian Mackey (born 20 May 1987) is an Irish Gaelic footballer who played for the Cavan county team from 2005 to 2019.

== Playing career ==
=== Club ===
==== Castlerahan ====
On 2 October 2011, Mackey lined out at corner-forward in his first county final, where Castlerahan faced Cavan Gaels. Mackey scored two points as Castlerahan fell to a heavy defeat.

Castlerahan wouldn't play in another county final until 2015, where they faced Kingscourt Stars on 11 October. Mackey kicked three points as Castlerahan lost the final by a point.

Castlerahan returned to the county final in 2016, where they faced neighbours Ramor United. The final was played on 9 October, and Mackey scored five points as the game ended in a draw. On 23 October, Mackey scored four points but Castlerahan lost the replay by two points.

On 8 October 2017, Mackey played in the county final for the third consecutive year, facing Cavan Gaels. Mackey scored one point but Castlerahan came out on the losing side yet again.

On 21 October 2018, Castlerahan were in the county final once again where they faced Crosserlough. Mackey scored four points, including the winning score, as Castlerahan came from behind to finally claim their first senior championship.

Castlerahan made the county final for the fifth consecutive year in 2019, facing Ramor United on 13 October. Mackey scored one point as Castlerahan edged the final for their second title in a row.

==== Mullinalaghta St Columba's ====
Mackey transferred from Castlerahan to Mullinalaghta St Columba's ahead of the 2020 season.

On 7 November 2021 Mackey played in his first Longford county final, with Mullinalaghta facing Mostrim. Mackey scored 2 points as Mullinalaghta comfortably came out on top, giving Mackey his first Longford title. Mackey was named man of the match for his performance in the final.

Mackey played in his second Longford final in 2022, facing Colmcille on 9 October. A late penalty secured a two-point win for Colmcille.

=== Inter-county ===
Mackey made his Cavan senior debut as a minor on 17 July 2005, coming on as a substitute in a qualifier win against Meath.

On 4 August 2013, Mackey started the All-Ireland quarter-final against Kerry. Mackey scored a point as Cavan lost by six points. Mackey was nominated for an All-Star award at the end of the season.

On 2 June 2019, Mackey started the Ulster semi-final against Armagh on the bench. He came on as a substitute and kicked two points to send the game to extra-time, before equalising in extra-time yet again to send the game to a replay. Mackey scored a point in the replay as Cavan reached their first Ulster final since 2001. On 23 June 2019, Mackey started on the bench for the Ulster Final against Donegal. Mackey scored a point as a second-half substitute but Cavan ultimately lost the final by five points. Mackey started Cavan's loss to Tyrone in the qualifiers on 6 July 2019. It proved to be Mackey's final game for Cavan.

Mackey announced his retirement from inter-county football on 10 January 2020.

== Honours ==
Castlerahan

- Cavan Senior Football Championship (2): 2018, 2019

Mullinalaghta St Columba's

- Longford Senior Football Championship (1): 2021

Individual

- Irish News Ulster All-Star (1): 2013
