= 2015 Cavan Minor Football Championship =

Gaelic Athletic Association club competition between Minor Cavan Gaelic football clubs

The 2015 Cavan Minor Football Championship was played between August and October 2015. It is the premier minor championship in Cavan. 8 teams took part − 6 clubs - Ramor United, Laragh United, Crosserlough, Cavan Gaels, Castlerahan and Knockbride - as well as two amalgamated teams - Southern Gaels (Gowna/Lacken) and St. Joseph's (Arva, Killeshandea and Drumlane).

Ramor United GFC competed in their third final in a row against Laragh United GFC in the final, winning by 1-09 to 1-07 in a replay. The first game was played before the Cavan Senior Football Championship final between Castlerahan and Kingscourt and finished Ramor 1-08 Laragh 0-11.

== Teams ==
6 clubs - Ramor United, Laragh United, Crosserlough, Cavan Gaels, Castlerahan and Knockbride - as well as two amalgamated teams - Southern Gaels (Gowna/Lacken) and St. Joseph's (Arva, Killeshandea and Drumlane). The teams for the 2015 Championship was decided by the top six teams in the Lakeside Manor Hotel Minor Football League Division 1 (Southern Gaels, St Josephs, Ramor, Crosserlough, Castlerahan and Cavan Gaels) and the top two teams in the Lakeside Manor Hotel Minor Football League Division 2 (Knockbride and Laragh).

== Format ==
The eight teams were drawn against each other in Round 1. The 4 winners were then drawn against each other (Round 2A) as were the 4 losers (Round 2B). The winners of the Round 2A games progressed to the semi-final and the losers entered Round 3. The winners of the Round 2B games progressed to Round 3 and the losers of Round 2B were eliminated. The winners of the Round 3 games joined the winners of Round 2A games in the semi-final.
