= Luke Fortune =

Cavan Gaelic footballer (born 1998)

Personal information
- Native name: Lúcás Ó Foirtcheirn (Irish)
- Born: 12 March 1998 (age 28)

Sport
- Sport: Gaelic Football
- Position: Corner Back/Wing Back
Club
- Years: Club
- Cavan Gaels
Club titles
- Cavan titles: 1
College
- Years: College
- UCD
College titles
- Sigerson titles: 1
Inter-county
- Years: County
- 2019–2022: Cavan
Inter-county titles
- Ulster titles: 1

Luke Fortune (born 12 March 1998) is an Irish Gaelic footballer who plays for the Cavan county team. He plays his club football with Cavan Gaels.

== Playing career ==
=== College ===
Fortune went to school at St Patrick's College in Cavan. On 17 March 2015, Fortune started at corner back in the MacRory Cup final against St Patrick's Academy, Dungannon. Cavan were winners on a 2–12 to 0–8 scoreline. Fortune played in the Hogan Cup semi-final against PBS Chorca Dhuibhne, where St Pat's suffered a three-point loss.

=== University ===
On 17 February 2018, Fortune started in defence as UCD faced NUI Galway in the Sigerson Cup final. UCD were winners by a single point.

=== Club ===
On 8 October 2017, Fortune started at corner back in his first county final, where Cavan Gaels faced Castlerahan. A 0–13 to 0–8 win gave Fortune his first county title. The Gaels would later defeat Lámh Dhearg and Derrygonnelly to reach the Ulster Club final. On 26 November, Fortune started at corner back as Cavan Gaels faced Slaughtneil in the Ulster final. It was Slaughneil's day as they ran out comfortable winners.

=== Inter-county ===
==== Minor and under-21 ====
On 19 July 2015, Fortune was at corner back as the Cavan minor team faced Derry in the Ulster final. Derry came out on top on a 1–11 to 0–11 scoreline.

Fortune was captain of the under-20 side in 2018, but Cavan suffered a heavy defeat in the first round against Donegal.

==== Senior ====
Fortune joined the Cavan senior panel ahead of the 2019 season. On 27 January 2019, Fortune made his National League debut as a substitute in a loss to Galway.

On 31 October 2020, Fortune made his championship debut, scoring two points from wing back in an Ulster quarter-final defeat of Monaghan. Fortune kept his place and started the Ulster final against Donegal on 22 November. Cavan won their first Ulster title since 1997 after a four-point win. On 5 December, Fortune started the All-Ireland semi-final loss to eventual champions Dublin.

On 2 April 2022, Fortune was at corner-back as Cavan faced Tipperary in the National League Division 4 final at Croke Park, with Cavan coming out winners on a 2–10 to 0–15 scoreline.

Cavan faced Westmeath in the 2022 Tailteann Cup Final on 9 July, and Fortune started the game on the bench. Fortune came on as a substitute as Cavan lost by four points.

== Honours ==
Cavan

- Ulster Senior Football Championship (1): 2020
- National Football League Division 4 (1): 2022

Cavan Gaels

- Cavan Senior Football Championship (1): 2017

UCD

- Sigerson Cup (1): 2018

St. Patrick's College Cavan

- MacRory Cup (1): 2015

Individual

- Irish News Ulster All-Star (1): 2020
