= Jason O'Reilly =

Cavan Gaelic footballer

Personal information
- Native name: Iasón Ó Raghallaigh (Irish)
- Nickname: Jayo
- Born: 23 August 1976 (age 50)
- Occupation: Postman
- Height: 5 ft 11 in (180 cm)

Sport
- Sport: Gaelic football
- Position: Full forward
Club
- Years: Club
- Belturbet
Inter-county
- Years: County
- 1996–2009: Cavan
Inter-county titles
- Ulster titles: 1

Jason O'Reilly (born 23 August 1976) is an Irish Gaelic footballer who plays for the Belturbet club and was a member of the Cavan county team from 1996 to 2009. A prolific goalscorer, O'Reilly is perhaps best known for scoring the winning goal in the 1997 Ulster Senior Football Championship Final.

== Playing career ==
Jason played with Belturbet from the youth level. He scored two goals in the 1995 Junior final win over Knockbride. He also scored the decisive goal as Belturbet claimed their first Intermediate title against Denn in 1996.

After being overlooked at minor level, O'Reilly first represented Cavan at under-21 level in 1996. Cavan claimed the Ulster title, and O'Reilly scored a goal in the All-Ireland semi-final win over Meath. On 8 September, Jason started the All-Ireland final against Kerry, scoring 1-1 as Kerry finished strong to win the title.

O'Reilly joined the senior squad in 1996, quickly establishing himself on the team. Cavan faced Derry in the 1997 Ulster Final, and Jason started the game on the bench. As a second half substitute, O'Reilly scored the game's only goal, pulling his shirt over his head in a 'Ravanelli' celeration. Cavan held on to claim their first Ulster championship in 28 years.

In 2001, Cavan reached another Ulster final, where they faced Tyrone. A first half goal from O'Reilly had Cavan leading at half time, but a strong finish from Tyrone meant they came out winners on a 1-13 to 1-11 scoreline.

Cavan reached the final of the National Football League in 2002, with Jason scoring 1-2 in the semi-final win over Roscommon. O'Reilly started the final against Tyrone, with Cavan falling to a nine-point loss.

O'Reilly never retired from inter-county football, but his Cavan career came to an abrupt end in 2009, after he wasn't contacted by manager Tommy Carr.

== Management career ==
In 2012, O'Reilly was the manager of Lacken when they won the Cavan Intermediate Football Championship, defeating Cootehill after a replay.

O'Reilly took over as manager of his home club Belturbet ahead of the 2014 season.

O'Reilly was appointed as the manager of Cavan Gaels for the 2017 season. He led the Gaels to the 2017 Cavan Senior Football Championship title with victory over Castlerahan. The Gaels later reached the Ulster Club final, where they were defeated by Derry champions Slaughtneil.

Ahead of the 2019 season, O'Reilly joined the Leitrim management team under manager Terry Hyland.

== Honours ==
=== Player ===
Cavan

- Ulster Senior Football Championship (1): 1997
- Ulster Under-21 Football Championship (1): 1996

Belturbet

- Cavan Intermediate Football Championship (1): 1996
- Cavan Junior Football Championship (1): 1995
