= 2020 Cavan Intermediate Football Championship =

2020 Cavan IFC
Tournament details
- County: Cavan
- Province: Ulster
- Year: 2020
- Trophy: Tommy Gilroy Cup
- Sponsor: Hotel Kilmore
- Date: 31 July – 27 September 2020
- Teams: 15

Winners
- Champions: Ballinagh (4th win)
- Manager: Adrian Maguire
- Captain: Thomas Moore

Runners-up
- Runners-up: Butlersbridge
- Manager: George Dugdale
- Captain: Feargal Flanagan

Promotion/Relegation
- Promoted team(s): Ballinagh
- Relegated team(s): No relegation

The 2020 Cavan Intermediate Football Championship was the 56th edition of Cavan GAA's premier Gaelic football tournament for intermediate graded clubs in County Cavan, Ireland. The tournament consists of 15 teams, the winner will not represent Cavan in the Ulster Intermediate Club Football Championship this year due to its cancellation.

The championship starts with a league stage and then progresses to a knock out stage. The COVID-19 pandemic brought forward the beginning and end dates for the championship but the format was not changed, although there was no relegation this year.

Ballinagh won the championship by defeating first-time finalists Butlersbridge in the decider.

== Team changes ==
The following teams have changed division since the 2018 championship season.

=== To Championship ===
Promoted from 2019 Cavan Junior Football Championship

- Killinkere – (Junior Champions)

Relegated from 2019 Cavan Senior Football Championship

- Cootehill

=== From Championship ===
Promoted to 2020 Cavan Senior Football Championship

- Laragh United – (Intermediate Champions)

Relegated to 2020 Cavan Junior Football Championship

- Swanlinbar

== League Stage ==
All 15 teams enter the competition at this stage. A random draw determines which teams face each other in each of the four rounds. No team can meet each other twice in the group stage. The top 8 teams go into a seeded draw for the quarter-finals.

Pos	Team	Pld	W	L	D	PD	Pts
1	Ballyhaise	4	4	0	0	+51	8
2	Butlersbridge	4	4	0	0	+25	8
3	Ballinagh	4	3	1	0	+22	6
4	Bailieborough Shamrocks	4	3	1	0	+21	6
5	Ballymachugh	4	3	1	0	+16	6
6	Belturbet	4	3	1	0	+5	6
7	Killinkere	4	2	1	1	+3	5
8	Cootehill	4	2	2	0	+10	4
9	Cuchulainns	4	2	2	0	+6	4
10	Drumlane	4	2	2	0	−3	4
11	Ramor United B	4	1	3	0	−43	2
12	Drumgoon	4	0	3	1	−33	1
13	Arva	4	0	4	0	−19	0
14	Killeshandra	4	0	4	0	−23	0
15	Cornafean	4	0	4	0	−34	0

=== Round 1 ===
31 July 2020 Round 1	Drumgoon	2–12 – 2–12	Killinkere	O'Raghallaigh Park
20:15				Referee: Ollie Donohoe

1 August 2020 Round 1	Drumlane	1–8 – 1–11	Butlersbridge	Rory O'Moore Park
17:00				Referee: Martin Sexton

1 August 2020 Round 1	Ballymachugh	2–7 – 0–10	Cornafean	Our Lady of Lourdes Park
19:30				Referee: Tony Gregory

2 August 2020 Round 1	Cuchulainns	0–13 – 2–10	Ballyhaise	Hugh O'Reilly Memorial Park
14:00				Referee: Kieran McCarville

2 August 2020 Round 1	Killeshandra	2–8 – 1–18	Bailieborough Shamrocks	Athletic Grounds
17:00				Referee: Padraig Sheridan

2 August 2020 Round 1	Belturbet	4–15 – 4–6	Ramor United B	Páirc Emmet
17:00				Referee: Harry Conaty

5 August 2020 Round 1	Arva	1–12 – 1–13	Ballinagh	Breffni Park
20:15				Referee: James Clarke

=== Round 2 ===
14 August 2020 Round 2	Ramor United B	2–8 – 2–6	Drumgoon	O'Raghallaigh Park
20:15				Referee: Paddy Clarke

15 August 2020 Round 2	Cuchulainns	1–13 – 0–8	Cornafean	Breffni Park
16:00				Referee: Pat Clarke

15 August 2020 Round 2	Killinkere	2–15 – 0–15	Arva	Athletic Grounds
16:00				Referee: John Emmo

16 August 2020 Round 2	Bailieborough Shamrocks	0–10 – 1–14	Belturbet	Breffni Park
13:00				Referee: Barry McMenamin

16 August 2020 Round 2	Killeshandra	1–7 – 0–17	Ballyhaise	Breffni Park
16:00				Referee: Thomas Doonan

16 August 2020 Round 2	Ballinagh	3–9 – 0–10	Ballymachugh	Dr. Plunkett Memorial Park
16:00				Referee: Stephen McKiernan

16 August 2020 Round 2	Drumlane	1–11 – 0–10	Cootehill	Breffni Park
19:00				Referee: Oliver Óg O'Reilly

=== Round 3 ===
8 August 2020 Round 3	Cootehill	3–12 – 3–13	Butlersbridge	Annalee Park
17:00				Referee: Jim Giblin

8 August 2020 Round 3	Cornafean	1–13 – 2–13	Drumlane	St Aidan's Park
19:30				Referee: Michael Lee

=== Round 4 ===
21 August 2020 Round 4	Butlersbridge	2–21 – 1–5	Ramor United B	Breffni Park
20:15		Report		Referee: Ollie Donohoe

21 August 2020 Round 4	Killeshandra	0–7 – 0–11	Ballymachugh	Our Lady of Lourdes Park
20:15				Referee: Barry McMenamin

22 August 2020 Round 4	Belturbet	1–14 – 0–12	Killinkere	Breffni Park
16:00				Referee: Kieran McCarville

22 August 2020 Round 4	Cootehill	2–12 – 0–8	Arva	O'Connell Park
18:30				Referee: Chris McCaffrey

22 August 2020 Round 4	Ballyhaise	3–20 – 0–5	Cornafean	Breffni Park
19:00				Referee: Padraig Sheridan

22 August 2020 Round 4	Bailieborough Shamrocks	4–16 – 1–11	Drumgoon	O'Raghallaigh Park
19:00				Referee: Raymond Tynan

23 August 2020 Round 4	Cuchulainns	0–12 – 0–9	Ballinagh	Breffni Park
19:00		Report		Referee: Martin Sexton

=== Round 5 ===
30 August 2020 Round 5	Bailieborough Shamrocks	2–13 – 0–12	Drumlane	P. J. Duke Park
14:00		Report		Referee: Martin Brady

30 August 2020 Round 5	Butlersbridge	2–17 – 2–15	Arva	First Ulster Park
14:00				Referee: Thomas Doonan

30 August 2020 Round 5	Killinkere	0–16 – 0–14	Cuchulainns	Dolan Park
14:00				Referee: John Emmo

30 August 2020 Round 5	Drumgoon	1–9 – 4–17	Ballymachugh	Breffni Park
14:00				Referee: Harry Conaty

30 August 2020 Round 5	Ballyhaise	3–16 – 1–5	Ramor United B	Dr. Plunkett Memorial Park
14:00				Referee: Martin Sexton

30 August 2020 Round 5	Belturbet	1–7 – 1–23	Ballinagh	St Matthew's Park
14:00				Referee: James Clarke

30 August 2020 Round 5	Killeshandra	1–14 – 3–13	Cootehill Celtic	St Felim's Park
14:00				Referee: Chris McCaffrey

== Knock-Out Stage ==
Quarter-finals
Butlersbridge	2–21
Killinkere	3–16
Bailieborough	1–17
Ballymachugh	3–10
Ballinagh	2–15
Belturbet	1–8
Ballyhaise	2–15
Cootehill	1–9

Semi-finals
Butlersbridge	3–12
Bailieborough	2–6
Ballinagh	1–17
Ballyhaise	1–13

Final
Butlersbridge	0–11
Ballinagh	0–23

=== Quarter-finals ===
4 September 2020 Quarter-final	Ballyhaise	2–15 – 1–9	Cootehill	Breffni Park
20:15				Referee: Martin Sexton

5 September 2020 Quarter-final	Bailieborough Shamrocks	1–17 – 3–10	Ballymachugh	Breffni Park
18:00				Referee: Raymond Tynan

6 September 2020 Quarter-final	Ballinagh	2–15 – 1–8	Belturbet	Breffni Park
14:00		Report		Referee: James Clarke

6 September 2020 Quarter-final	Butlersbridge	2–21 – 3–16	Killinkere	Breffni Park
16:15				Referee: Padraig Sheridan

=== Semi-finals ===
20 September 2020 Semi-final	Butlersbridge	3–12 – 2–6	Bailieborough Shamrocks	Breffni Park
12:00				Referee: Brendan Sweeney

20 September 2020 Semi-final	Ballinagh	1–17 – 1–13	Ballyhaise	Breffni Park
17:15				Referee: Oliver Óg O'Reilly

=== Final ===
27 September 2020 Final	Butlersbridge	0–11 – 0–23	Ballinagh	Breffni Park
17:00	Caoimhin O'Reilly 0–4 (0-3f), Fionntán O'Reilly 0-3 (0-1f, 0-1m), Jonathan Leddy 0-3 (0-1f), Feargal Flanagan 0–1	Report	Niall McDermott 0–12 (0-5f, 0-3m), Shane Finnegan 0-3 (0-2f), Cormac Timoney 0-3, Kevin Smith 0–2, Niall O'Reilly 0-1, Thomas Smith 0-1, Paddy O'Brien 0–1	Referee: Martin Sexton; Man of the Match: Niall McDermott (Ballinagh)
