= Micheál Lyng =

Cavan Gaelic footballer

Personal information
- Born: 7 February 1985 (age 41) Cavan, Ireland
- Occupation: Secondary school teacher

Sport
- Sport: Gaelic football
- Position: Centre forward
Club
- Years: Club
- 2001–: Cavan Gaels
Club titles
- Cavan titles: 9
College
- Years: College
- DCU
College titles
- Sigerson titles: 2
Inter-county
- Years: County
- 2004–2015: Cavan

Micheál Lyng (born 7 February 1985) is a Gaelic footballer from Cavan. He plays for the Cavan Gaels club and, formerly, the Cavan county team. He lines out as a centre-forward.

== Playing career ==
=== Club ===
Lyng played underage for Crosserlough up until he was 16 years old, before transferring to Cavan Gaels. Lyng was a key player as Cavan Gaels dominated the Cavan Championship. Lyng won his first County title in 2003, and added titles in 2004 and 2005 to complete a 3 in a row, defeating Mullahoran on each occasion. The Gaels met Mullahoran again in the 2006 final, but ended up on the losing side. The Gaels bounced back to beat Gowna in the 2007 final, before defeating Denn in back-to-back finals in 2008 and 2009, completing a second 3 in a row. They reached the final again in 2010, but Kingscourt Stars were victorious on the day. The Gaels regained their title in 2011 by outclassing Castlerahan. After missing out in 2012, the Gaels returned to the county final in 2013 against Ballinagh. Despite going in as massive favourites, The Gaels were shocked as Ballinagh won their first title. The 2014 final featured the Gaels against Kingscourt once again. The Gaels won by a point, with Lyng getting the winning score. It would take another 3 years for the Gaels to return to the county final in 2017, with Lyng as captain of the team. A 0-13 to 0-8 win over Castlerahan gave Lyng his ninth Senior Championship medal, and he also had the honour of accepting the cup. Lyng went on to captain his team in the Ulster Club Final, but were beaten by Slaughtneil.

=== Inter-county ===
He made his debut for Cavan against Galway in an NFL match before the start of the All-Ireland Championship in the summer of 2004 and scored 4 points. He started at centre-half forward in the opening game of Cavan's Ulster Championship campaign in 2004 against Down and scored 6 points in the match. In 2005, Micheál struggled with groin and hamstring injuries all year and missed most of Cavan's campaign. He did manage to score an injury-time free after the draw with would-be champions Tyrone in an early round though. In October, his club Cavan Gaels won a third successive county championship but was soon injured again while on duty for the Ulster team in the Interprovincial Series. He played for Cavan up until 2011 when he was among six players dropped by Val Andrews. He was called back into the panel for 2014 by Terry Hyland. Lyng retired after the 2015 season.

== Honours ==
Cavan Gaels

- Cavan Senior Football Championship (9): 2003, 2004, 2005, 2007, 2008, 2009, 2011, 2014, 2017 (c)
- Cavan Minor Football Championship (3): 2001, 2002, 2003
- Cavan Under-21 Football Championship (1): 2004
- Ulster Senior Club Football League (1): 2004

DCU

- Sigerson Cup (2): 2006, 2010
- O'Byrne Cup (1): 2010

Ulster

- Railway Cup (1): 2004
