= Niall Murphy (disambiguation) =

Niall Murphy is an Irish Gaelic footballer.

Niall Murphy may also refer to:

- Niall Murphy (runner) (born 2004), Irish athlete
- Niall Murphy, Irish Green Party politician

== See also ==
- Niall Murray (born 1999), Irish rugby union player
- Niall Murray (Gaelic footballer) (born 1990), Gaelic footballer from Cavan
