= P. J. Carroll (Gaelic footballer) =

Irish Gaelic football player and manager (1944–2024)

Personal information
- Native name: P. S. Ó Cearúill (Irish)
- Born: 1944 Cavan, Ireland
- Died: 29 October 2024 (aged 80) Cavan, Ireland
- Occupation: Printer

Sport
- Sport: Gaelic football
Club
- Years: Club
- Cavan Gaels
Club titles
- Cavan titles: 3
Inter-county
- Years: County
- Cavan
Inter-county titles
- Ulster titles: 0
- All-Irelands: 0
- NFL: 0

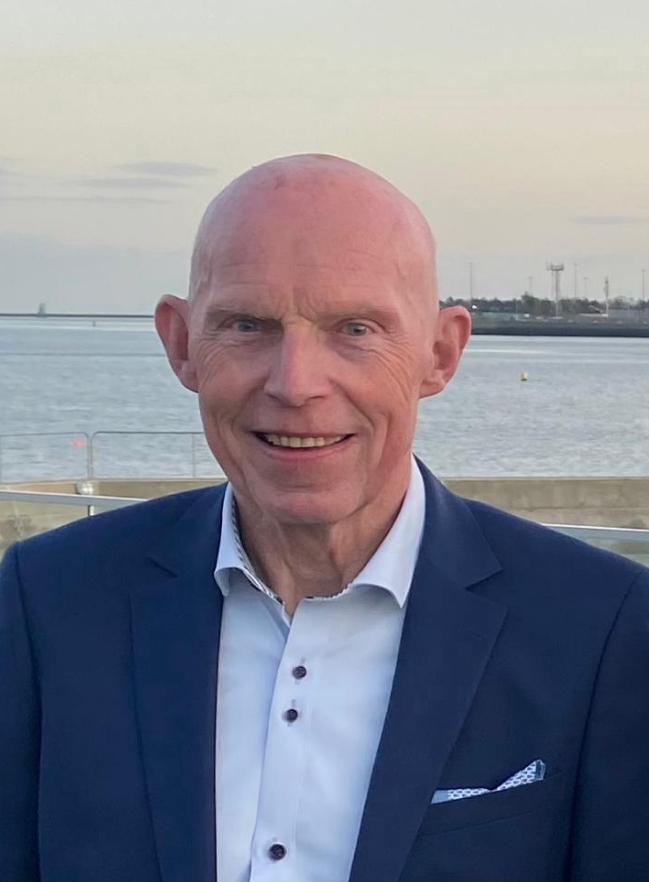
pjcarroll

Patrick Joseph Carroll (1944 – 29th October 2024) was an Irish Gaelic football player and manager. He played at club level with Cavan Gaels and at inter-county level with various Cavan teams. Carroll later served as manager of several club and inter-county teams.

== Playing career ==
Carroll began his senior club career as a 15-year-old in 1959 when he was asked to line out in a depleted Cavan Gaels team for an away league game. He subsequently lined out with the club's under-16 and minor teams, before winning his first Cavan SFC title in 1965. He later won further SFC honours in 1975, when he was man of the match, and 1977. Carroll also lined out with Cavan in the minor, under-21, junior and senior grades, however, an injury in 1964 curtailed his inter-county career.

== Management career ==
Carroll first became involved in team management and coaching when he took charge of the Cavan Gaels minor team at the age of 22 and guided the team to consecutive Cavan MFC titles. He later served as the club's senior team manager before having SFC successes with Gaeil Colmcille in Meath, Castleblayney Faughs in Monaghan and Aughavas in Leitrim. At inter-county level, Carroll managed Cavan on two separate occasions and Sligo. He also managed Leitrim to the All-Ireland SBFC title in 1990.

== Death ==
Carroll died on 29 October 2024, at the age of 80.

== Honours ==
=== Player ===
Cavan Gaels

- Cavan Senior Football Championship: 1965, 1975, 1977

=== Management ===
Cavan Gaels

- Cavan Junior B Football Championship: 1985
- Cavan Minor Football Championship: 1967, 1968

Gaeil Colmcille

- Meath Senior Football Championship: 1991
- Meath Under-21 Football Championship: 1991

Castleblayney Faughs

- Monaghan Senior Football Championship: 1998

Aughavas

- Leitrim Senior Football Championship: 2000

Leitrim

- All-Ireland Senior B Football Championship: 1990
- Connacht Under-21 Football Championship: 1991
