= Cavan Under-21 Football Championship =

Annual Gaelic football competition

Cavan Under-20 Football Championship
- Founded: 1975
- Region: Cavan, Ireland (GAA)
- Title holders: Gowna (6th title)
- First winner: Laragh United
- Most titles: Gowna (6 titles)
- Motto: "The Future is Blue"
- Official website: www.cavangaa.ie

The Cavan Under-20 Football Championship is an annual Gaelic Athletic Association club competition between Under-20 Cavan Gaelic football clubs. It was first competed for in 1975. Laragh United won the first Under-21 championship.

== Top winners ==
#	Club	Wins	Years won
1	Gowna	6	1981, 1985, 1986, 1987, 2023, 2024
2	Ramor United	5	1977, 1980, 2015, 2016, 2019
2	Crosserlough	5	1983, 1984, 1989, 1991, 2018
3	Bailieborough Shamrocks	4	1988, 1992, 1993, 1994
3	Cavan Gaels	4	2000, 2001, 2004, 2012
4	Mullahoran	3	1990, 1998, 1999
4	Ramor United-Munterconnaught	3	2008, 2009, 2010
4	Southern Gaels (Lacken/Gowna)	3	2017, 2021, 2022
5	Laragh United	2	1975, 1976
5	Kingscourt	2	1979, 1982
5	St Killian's	2	1995, 1997
5	Cormore Gaels	2	2002, 2003
5	Castlerahan	2	2006, 2007
5	Assan Gaels (Lavey/Killinkere/Cuchulainns)	2	2011, 2013
6	Ballinagh	1	1978
6	St. Brigid's	1	1996
6	Lacken	1	2005
6	St Joseph's (Arva/Killeshandra/Drumlane)	1	2014

== List of finals ==
Year	Winner	Score	Opponent	Ref
1975	Laragh United			
1976	Laragh United			
1977	Ramor United			
1978	Ballinagh			
1979	Kingscourt Stars			
1980	Ramor United			
1981	Gowna			
1982	Kingscourt Stars			
1983	Crosserlough			
1984	Crosserlough			
1985	Gowna			
1986	Gowna			
1987	Gowna			
1988	Bailieborough Shamrocks			
1989	Crosserlough			
1990	Mullahoran			
1991	Crosserlough			
1992	Bailieborough Shamrocks			
1993	Bailieborough Shamrocks			
1994	Bailieborough Shamrocks			
1995	St Brigid's			
1996	St Killian's			
1997	St Killian's			
1998	Mullahoran			
1999	Mullahoran			
2000	Cavan Gaels			
2001	Cavan Gaels			
2002	Cormore Gaels			
2003	Cormore Gaels			
2004	Cavan Gaels			
2005	Lacken			
2006	Castlerahan			
2007	Castlerahan			
2008	Ramor-Munterconnaught		Cavan Gaels	
2009	Ramor-Munterconnaught	1–9 – 0–8	Belturbet	
2010	Ramor-Munterconnaught	1–17 – 0–4	Ballinagh-Cornafean	
2011	Assan Gaels		Newtown Gaels	
2012	Cavan Gaels		Assan Gaels	
2013	Assan Gaels	0–12 – 0–11	Cavan Gaels	
2014	St Joseph's		Ramor United	
2015	Ramor United	2–12 – 0–8	Assan Gaels	
2016	Ramor United	5–15 – 2–8	Assan Gaels	
2017	Southern Gaels	5–18 – 1–1	Assan Gaels	
2018	Crosserlough	3–13 – 2–6	Southern Gaels	
2019	Ramor United	2–14 – 1–11	St Aidan's	
2020	Competition not played			
2021	Southern Gaels	1–14 – 0–13	Cuchulainns	
2022	Southern Gaels	1–14 – 2–10 (aet)	Cuchulainns	
2023	Gowna	3–12 – 1–12	Ramor United	
2024	Gowna	0–10 – 1–5	Ramor United	
2025	Killygarry			
