= Seánie Johnston =

Cavan and Kildare Gaelic footballer

Personal information
- Nickname: Jelly
- Born: Cavan, Ireland
- Occupation: PE Teacher

Sport
- Sport: Gaelic football
- Position: Left corner forward
Clubs
- Years: Club
- 1998–2011 2012–2013 2013–2020 2022–: Cavan Gaels; St Kevin's; Cavan Gaels
Club titles
- Cavan titles: 10
College
- Years: College
- DCU
College titles
- Sigerson titles: 2
Inter-county
- Years: County
- 2004–2011 2012–2013 2016–2019: Cavan; Kildare; Cavan

Seánie Johnston is an Irish Gaelic footballer. A former player with the Cavan county team and Cavan Gaels.Recently Managed Cavan GAA Club Cúchulainn's GFC (Cavan) in the ACFL Division Two for the 2021 season. In 2022, Johnston took up a coaching position as a forwards coach with Cavan county team , Johnston transferred to the Kildare county team in 2012. He returned to the Cavan senior football panel in time for the 2016 Dr McKenna Cup.

== Playing career ==
=== Club ===
In Cavan, Johnston played for the Cavan Gaels club, with whom he won 10 Cavan Senior Football Championships in 2001, 03, 04, 05, 07, 08, 09, 11, 14 and 17. He also played with Dublin City University and helped them to win their first Sigerson Cup in 2006.

=== Inter-county ===
In January 2012, Kieran McGeeney announced on Kfm that Johnston wanted to transfer to a Kildare club, to become eligible for the Kildare county team. Such transfers are restricted under Rules 6.1 and 6.9 of the GAA's Official Guide. Johnston was granted his transfer in summer 2012, making a symbolic "cameo" appearance in a hurling match for Coill Dubh. He struck back at criticism, asserting he wants to play football and live a quiet life in the country. Martin Breheny later compared the fuss over Johnston's transfer with the lack of fuss over Ireland rugby out-half Johnny Sexton's transfer abroad; Sexton left Ireland for Racing Métro of Paris.

On 15 July 2012, Johnston made his debut for Kildare in an All-Ireland Senior Football Championship qualifier against his native Cavan, coming on as a substitute late in the second half and scoring Kildare's final point of the match. The substitution was regarded by many as a genius managerial move by McGeeney whose team were only winning by 16 points at the time. Some commentators point to this move as the starting point for McGeeney's illustrious and successful managerial career which so far includes one under 21 Leinster title. Johnston went on to have an average football career. On 2 February 2013, he started his first major competitive game for Kildare against All-Ireland champions Donegal in the opening game of the 2013 National Football League.
