= Cavan Minor Football Championship =

Annual Gaelic football competition

- Founded: 1935
- Region: Cavan, Ireland (GAA)
- Title holders: Denn (3rd title)
- First winner: Arva
- Most titles: Cavan Gaels (17 titles)
- Sponsors: Virginia International Logistics
- Motto: "The Future is Blue"
- Official website: http://www.cavangaa.ie

The Cavan Minor Football Championship is an annual Gaelic Athletic Association club competition between Minor Cavan Gaelic football clubs. It was first competed for in 1935. Arva won the first Minor championship. Cavan Gaels hold the most titles at 17 including 7 in a row between 1998 and 2004.

== List of finals ==
List of Cavan Minor Football Championship finals
Year	Winners	Score	Opponent	Ref.
1935	Arva			
1936	Killinkere			
1939	Arva			
1940	Ballinagh			
1941	Ballinagh			
1946	Belturbet			
1947	De La Salle (Cavan Slashers)			
1948	Bailieborough Shamrocks			
1949	De La Salle (Cavan Slashers)			
1950	Denn			
1951	Ballyconnell	1-7 (0-4)	Kingscourt	0-1(0-0)
1952	Denn	2–3 – 1–3	Gowna	
1953	Butlersbridge			
1954	Crosserlough			
1955	Crosserlough			
1956	Killinkere			
1957	Kingscourt Stars			
1958	Gowna			
1959	Cootehill			
1960	Lacken			
1961	Cornafean			
1962	Bailieborough Shamrocks			
1963	Crosserlough			
1964	Crosserlough			
1965	Killeshandra			
1966	Killeshandra			
1967	Cavan Gaels			
1968	Cavan Gaels			
1969	Mullagh			
1970	St Joseph's			
1971	Lacken			
1972	Drumlane			
1973	Drumlane			
1974	Lavey/Laragh United			
1975	Lurgan			
1976	Lavey/Laragh United			
1977	Lavey/Laragh United			
1978	Cavan Gaels			
1979	Annalee Gaels			
1980	Lurgan			
1981	Arva/Killeshandra		Cavan Gaels	
1982	Kingscourt Stars			
1983	Gowna	2–9 – 0–8	Denn	
1984	Gowna	1–7 – 0–7	Mullahoran/Ballymachugh	
1985	Gowna	1–9 – 1–7	Bailieborough Shamrocks	
1986	Crosserlough/Mountnugent			
1987	Cavan Gaels	2–7 – 2–5	Bailieborough Shamrocks	
1988	Crosserlough		Cuchulainns	
1989	Crosserlough			
1990	Bailieborough Shamrocks		Cavan Gaels	
1991	Cavan Gaels		Bailieborough Shamrocks	
1992	Mullahoran			
1993	Mullahoran			
1994	St Finbarr’s			
1995	Crosserlough			
1996	St Killian's			
1997	O’Raghallaigh Gaels			
1998	Cavan Gaels			
1999	Cavan Gaels		Crosserlough	
2000	Cavan Gaels		Crosserlough	
2001	Cavan Gaels	2–15 – 2–11	St Mary's	
2002	Cavan Gaels	0–9 – 1–3	Cormore Gaels	
2003	Cavan Gaels			
2004	Cavan Gaels	1–6 – 1–6	Lurgan	
2004	Cavan Gaels	2–8 – 1–8 (R)	Lurgan	
2005	Castlerahan		Crosserlough	
2005	Castlerahan	0–8 – 0–3 (R)	Crosserlough	
2006	Cavan Gaels	2–15 – 2–11	Lurgan	
2007	Cavan Gaels	5–15 – 1–5	Lurgan	
2008	Cavan Gaels	2–17 – 3–7	St Joseph's	
2009	Killann Gaels	1–9 – 1–6	Ballyhaise	
2010	Cavan Gaels	2–12 – 2–12	St Joseph's	
2010	Cavan Gaels	2–13 – 1–6 (R)	St Joseph's	
2011	O'Raghallaigh Gaels	0–13 – 1–4	Cavan Gaels	
2012	Lavey/Castlerahan	0–6 – 0–6	North Eastern Gaels	
2012	Lavey/Castlerahan	2–10 – 1–9 (R)	North Eastern Gaels	
2013	Ramor United	5–11 – 2–10	Templeport	
2014	Southern Gaels	2–8 – 0–11	Ramor United	
2015	Ramor United	1–8 – 0–11	Laragh United	
2015	Ramor United	1–9 – 1–7 (R)	Laragh United	
2016	Crosserlough	3–10 – 1–9	Knockbride	
2017	Ramor United	2–9 – 0–12	Southern Gaels	
2018	Oliver Plunketts	4–14 – 1–8	Lough Uachtar Gaels	
2019	Drumloman Gaels	0–17 – 1–12	Killygarry	
2020	Southern Gaels	5–13 – 2–5	Ballyhaise	
2021	Killygarry	2–14 – 1–8	Knockbride	
2022	Ramor United	0–14 – 1–10	Killygarry	
2023	Cavan Gaels	1–9 – 0–6	Mullahoran	
2024	Kingscourt Stars	3–9 – 0–10	Southern Gaels	
2025	Southern Gaels	0–14 – 0–9	Mullahoran	
2026	Denn	1–22 – 1–11	Butlersbridge	

== Performances by club ==
Performances in the Cavan Minor Football Championship by club
Club	Titles	Years won
Cavan Gaels	17	1967, 1968, 1978, 1987, 1991, 1998, 1999, 2000, 2001, 2002, 2003, 2004, 2006, 2007, 2008, 2010, 2023
Crosserlough	8	1954, 1955, 1963, 1964, 1988, 1989, 1995, 2016
Gowna	4	1958, 1984, 1983, 1985
Ramor United	4	2013, 2015, 2017, 2022
Bailieborough Shamrocks	3	1948, 1962, 1990
Kingscourt Stars	3	1957, 1982, 2024
Lavey/Laragh United	3	1974, 1976, 1977
Southern Gaels (Lacken/Gowna)	3	2014, 2020, 2025
Denn	3	1950, 1952, 2026
Arva	2	1935, 1939
Ballinagh	2	1940, 1941
Killinkere	2	1936, 1956
De La Salle (Cavan Slashers)	2	1947, 1949
Lacken	2	1960, 1971
Killeshandra	2	1965, 1966
Drumlane	2	1972, 1973
Lurgan	2	1975, 1980
Mullahoran	2	1992, 1993
O'Raghallaigh Gaels (Kingscourt/Shercock)	2	1997, 2011
Belturbet	1	1946
Ballyconnell	1	1951
Butlersbridge	1	1953
Cootehill	1	1959
Cornafean	1	1961
Mullagh	1	1969
St Joseph's	1	1970
Annalee Gaels	1	1979
Arva/Killeshandra	1	1981
Crosserlough/Mountnugent	1	1986
St Finbarr's	1	1994
St Killian's	1	1996
Castlerahan	1	2005
Killann Gaels (Bailieborough/Shercock)	1	2009
Lavey/Castlerahan	1	2012
