= Killygarry GAA =

Cavan-based Gaelic games club

Killygarry
- Coill an Gharraí
- Founded: 1966
- County: Cavan
- Colours: Red and Black
- Grounds: Killygarry Athletic Grounds, Crubany
- Coordinates: 53°57′54.0951″N 7°19′5.1462″W

Playing kits
Standard colours

Killygarry are a Gaelic football club from County Cavan in Ireland. They are affiliated to Cavan GAA.

== History ==
The Killygarry club area as it now stands had a football club down the years before the formation of the present club in 1966 but these teams went out of existence. Still the Killygarry area produced many players for neighbouring clubs (and county too). There were schoolboy football games between Killygarry, Crubany, Castletara and Swellan played at venues such as Crowe's Rock or behind Fitzpatrick's shop. These were played several times a year and continued at various age levels to eighteen or so.

Around the late 50s/early 60s a number of promising minor players were coming along and the idea of playing for a club team under the Killygarry name was tossed around. Enthusiasm was high and after a few meetings Killygarry GFC was born.

Killygarry GAA Club was formed in 1966 when young football enthusiasts from the Killygarry hinterland who were playing with local teams like Lavey, Drumalee, Cavan Gaels, Laragh and Ballinagh, held a meeting in Killygarry National School.

The club entered the junior ranks and its first game in 1966 was against Cavan Gaels on Narrack's Hill.

In the space of a few years the team worked their way up through the ranks. They won the Intermediate Championship in 1970 by beating Cootehill in the final. They were promoted to Senior and the following year 1971 saw them reach the Senior Championship final where they were defeated by the Crosserlough team of that time. On 8 May 1988, the Killygarry Athletic Grounds were opened in Crubany. The club went into the ‘90s with similar expectations to that of the original team, winning the Junior title again in 1990 by beating Kildallan in the final. The club also won many underage titles in the same decade. The next big win was in 1998 when they won the Intermediate Championship beating Denn in the final. They went on to achieve the double that year by winning the Division 2 League, beating Shercock in the final.

== Crest ==
Despite the club's existence since 1966, no crest was ever created, until after a local raffle to decide the crest in 2009. This new crest now sits on all Killygarry jerseys & merchandise. The crest incorporates the following elements:

- The Irish name for Killygarry, "Coill na Garrai".
- A picture to represent Coill an Gharrai.
- A picture to represent Slieve Glah, which overlooks the grounds at Crubany.
- A picture to represent a football which is the main sport played at the club.
- The old Gaelic Athletic Association logo, to represent we are a GAA club.
- The year the club was founded – 1966.

== Killygarry Athletic Grounds ==
On 8 May 1988, the Killygarry Athletic Grounds were opened in Crubany. The grounds host a main field, a training field, gym, running track, four changing rooms, media room, car park, shop and kitchen.

== Teams ==
The club contains teams from underage right through to senior level. There is an U-7, U-9, U-11, U-13, U-15, Minor, a Senior and 2 Reserve teams. The Killygarry ladies have an U-12, U-14, U-16, Minor & Senior Squads.

== Kit ==
Traditionally Killygarry have always worn red and black, hence the Nickname "The Red & Blacks". The Jersey is mainly red with black stripes on the sleeves and sides. The shorts are mainly black with red stripes on either side. The Socks are black with a red horizontal stripe on top.

== Honours ==
- Cavan Senior Football Championship: 0
  - Runners-up 1971, 2022
- Cavan Intermediate Football Championship: 2
  - 1970, 1998
- Cavan Junior Football Championship: 1
  - 1990
- Cavan Under-21 Football Championship: 1
  - 2025
- Cavan Minor Football Championship: 1
  - 2021
