= Lacken Celtic GFC =

Cavan-based Gaelic games club

- Leacáin Celtic CLG
- Founded: 1890
- County: Cavan
- Colours: Blue and Navy
- Grounds: Joe Crowe Park, Garrymore, Cavan

Playing kits
Standard colours

Senior Club Championships
	All Ireland	Ulster champions	Cavan champions
Football:	-	-	1
Hurling:	-	-	-
Ladies' football:	-	-	-

Lacken are a Gaelic football club from County Cavan in Ireland. They are affiliated to Cavan GAA.

== History ==
Lacken Celtic GFC was formed in the 1890s by men who returned from working overseas in Scotland. The club got its name in honour of the Glasgow Celtic Soccer Club and the team wore the green and white jerseys synonymous with the Celtic club.

At the time, the home pitch was known as "The Green" and was located on the banks of the River Erne (beside Scarvey Bridge, Corlismore). The club did go out of existence however for a few years before being reformed in 1907.

=== 1908 Senior Championship ===
The GAA was only in existence for 24 years when Lacken won their first and only senior championship. The County Championship of 1908 began in September and was run on league basis. The county was divided into two divisions East and West. Lacken Celtics were in the western division along with Cavan Slashers, Crosserlough Young Irelanders, Mullahoran Dreadnoughts, Cornafean, Crubany Sarsfields, Drumlane Sons of O’Connells and Ballyconnell First Ulsters. Games were played on a double round league system with teams of seventeen players.

Lacken Celtics topped the western division in March 1909 when they defeated Cornafean in the divisional final in the Show Grounds, Cavan (Terry Coyle Park). They then faced Lavey) Joe Biggars in the county final who were victorious in the Eastern Division. The county final was played in Crosserlough on 27 June 1909 and it was Lacken who finished on top on a score line of seven points to three points becoming the 1908 Senior Champions. Unfortunately, to this day, Peter Maguire is the only Lacken captain to lift the Senior Championship Cup.

== Kit ==
After returning from Scotland the founders decided that Lacken Celtic should wear the same colours as Glasgow Celtic, green and white hooped jerseys. Now they wear sky blue jerseys with navy trims, navy shorts and navy socks.

== Notable players ==
- Raymond Galligan
- Thomas Galligan

== Honours ==
- Cavan Senior Football Championship: 1
  - 1908
- Cavan Intermediate Football Championship: 4
  - 1967, 1997, 2004, 2012
- Cavan Junior Football Championship: 1
  - 2026
- Cavan Under-21 Football Championship: 3
  - 2005, 2017*, 2021* (*Southern Gaels {Gowna/Lacken})
- Cavan Minor Football Championship: 4
  - 1960, 1971, 2014*, 2020* (*Southern Gaels {Gowna/Lacken})
