= Lavey GFC (Cavan) =

Cavan-based Gaelic games club

Lavey
- Leamhaí
- County: Cavan
- Colours: Black and White
- Grounds: Lavey GAA Grounds, New Inn

Playing kits
Standard colours

Senior Club Championships
	All Ireland	Ulster champions	Cavan champions
Football:	0	0	1

Lavey are a Gaelic football club from County Cavan in Ireland. They are affiliated with Cavan GAA. The parish of Lavey (formerly also transcribed as "Lavay" or "Lowey"; from the Gaelic "Leamhach", a place producing elm trees") is in the barony of Upper Loughtee, County Cavan, between Stradone and Ballyjamesduff, near Virginia.

== History ==
Lavey won the Cavan Junior Football Championship for the very first time in 1950, but the final wasn't played until 1951. Later the same year, the club won the Cavan Senior Football Championship for the only time in the club's history.

The club won the Cavan Intermediate Football Championship for the first time in 2009, beating Cootehill in the final. Their year didn't end there, and wins over Kinawley in the quarter-final and Fanad Gaels in the semi-final sent Lavey into the final of the Ulster Intermediate Club Football Championship. Lavey lost the final by two points to Cookstown Fr. Rock's.

== Honours ==
- Cavan Senior Football Championship: 1
  - 1951
- Cavan Intermediate Football Championship: 1
  - 2009
- Cavan Junior Football Championship: 3
  - 1950, 1975, 2003
- Cavan Under-21 Football Championship: 2
  - 2011*, 2013* (*Assan Gaels (Lavey/Killinkere/Cuchulainns))
- Cavan Minor Football Championship: 4
  - 1974*, 1976*, 1977*, 2012** (*Lavey/Laragh United) (**Lavey/Castlerahan)
