= Ramor United GFC =

Cavan-based Gaelic games club

- Ramhar Aontaithe
- Founded: 1976
- County: Cavan
- Colours: Amber and Black
- Grounds: Dolan Park, Virginia
- Coordinates: 53°49′51″N 7°04′10″W

Playing kits
| First colours | Second colours |

Senior Club Championships
| | All Ireland | Ulster champions | Cavan champions |
|---|---|---|---|
| Football: | 0 | 0 | 5 |

Ramor United /ˈrɑːmər/ are a Gaelic football club from Virginia, County Cavan in Ireland. The club, which is named for Lough Ramor, is affiliated to Cavan GAA. Formed in the 1970s to represent the parish of Lurgan, Ramor United has won the Cavan Senior Football Championship on several occasions.

== History ==
A team representing the parish of Lurgan was first formed in 1971 when three clubs in the area – Maghera McFinns, Lurgan GFC and Virginia Blues – amalgamated to contest games in the Cavan Senior Championship. This coming-together cumulated in the Cavan Senior Championship being won by a team representing the parish, for the first time, in 1974.

Following this, at a meeting in the courthouse in Virginia in 1976, it was proposed that a more permanent alliance be formed. The new club, Ramor United GFC, was subsequently formed as a single parish club. The name "Ramor United" was chosen as Lough Ramor spans the parish. The name is unusual, with "United" being more associated with association football (soccer).

The newly formed Ramor United club captured the Junior B Championship in 1978, and both the U-21 Championship and Senior Division 2 League in 1980. In 1982, the club bought a new ground, known locally as the "football field". Fundraising was undertaken to fund the purchase. A galvanised fence, located along the road next to the field, was replaced with a hedge. A viewing stand, dugouts, goalposts and a railing around the field were also erected.

A further acre of ground was later purchased for a clubhouse and car park. The clubhouse now has a fully-equipped gym and is sometimes used by other clubs. The clubhouse and football field were officially opened on 6 May 1990. The grounds received the "most improved grounds award" from the Cavan County Board in 1991.

On the pitch, Ramor won an historic double in 1985, capturing the Senior Championship title and winning the Senior League Division 1. The club also won the Senior League in 1986.

The 1990s started successfully for the club, winning the Division 1A league title both in 1990 and 1991. Then, in 1992, Ramor captured the Senior Championship, beating Bailieborough Shamrocks by a single point in the final.

In Autumn 1993, the club bought an additional 5 acres of land, adjacent to the clubhouse, which adjoined the lake. A viewing stand with toilet facilities and wheelchair access was built on the second pitch.

The Ramor United Juniors won the Junior B Championship in 1996 and retained their title in 1997. Ramor won the Senior League in 1996. Ramor won the Senior Division 2 League in 2008

Ramor United won the Cavan Senior Football Championship title in 2016 beating Castlerahan in the final after a replay and thus bridging a 24-year gap since their last Senior championship title. The club also won the 2021 Cavan Senior Football Championship title.

== Kit ==
Ramor United's kit consists of amber jerseys with black trim, black shorts and black socks with amber trim.

== Football titles ==
- Cavan Senior Football Championship (5): 1974, 1985, 1992, 2016, 2021
- Cavan Under-21 Football Championship (5): 1977, 1980, 2008, 2009, 2010, 2015, 2016
- Cavan Minor Football Championship (4): 2013, 2015, 2017, 2022
