= Cavan Gaels GAA =

Cavan-based Gaelic games club

Cavan Gaels GFC
- Gaeil an Chabháin
- Founded: 1957
- County: Cavan
- Colours: Blue and White
- Grounds: Terry Coyle Park, Cavan
- Coordinates: 53°59′17″N 7°21′48″W

Playing kits
Standard colours

Senior Club Championships
	All Ireland	Ulster champions	Cavan champions
Football:	-	-	14
Hurling:	-	-	5

Cavan Gaels is a Gaelic Athletic Association club from Cavan Town, County Cavan in Ireland. They are affiliated to Cavan GAA. The club was founded in 1957 following the merging of two clubs in Cavan Town, Cavan Harps and Cavan Slashers. They are the second most successful team in Cavan GAA history, with 14 Senior Championship titles, the most recent being in 2017. Cavan Gaels appeared in 16 of the 20 Cavan Senior Football Championship finals between 1998 and 2017 – winning 10.

== History ==
The club was founded in 1957 in Cavan Town, County Cavan, Ireland after the merging of two clubs in the town, Cavan Slashers and Cavan Harps. The name Cavan Gaels was first suggested by Hugh Doonan, the father of the 2003 Cavan Senior Football Championship winning captain James Doonan. A year after their foundation, they lost the Cavan Senior Football Championship to Crosserlough 3–07 to 3–04. They won their first Cavan Senior Football Championship in 1965, beating Baileborough Celtic. They lost their next two finals both to Crosserlough in 1968 and 1972. In 1975, they regained the Oliver Plunkett Cup beating rivals Crosserlough; They won it again in 1977 and 1981, beating St. Mary's and Ballyhaise, their last for 23 years. They lost the 1984 final to Laragh United, the 1997 final to Mullahoran and the 2001 final to Gowna 2–10 to 0–11. The Gaels then appeared in every final from 2000 to 2011. They won 8 Cavan Senior Football Championship winning two trebles (2003–2005 and 2007–2009). After defeat to Gowna in 2000, they won the following year beating Gowna 0–18 to 0–07. In 2002, they lost again to Gowna. In 2003, 2004 and 2005, they beat Mullahoran before being beaten by Mullahoran in 2006. In 2007, the Gaels beat Gowna 0–12 to 0–11, the first of another treble. In 2008 and 2009, they beat Denn GFC 0–12 to 0–11 and 1–10 to 1–11. They lost to Kingscourt Stars in 2010 1–10 to 1–09 but regained the title in 2011 beating Castlerahan 1–14 to 1–12. Their largest winning margin in a Cavan Senior Football Championship final. Their run of consecutive final appearances was ended in 2012 when they were beaten in the quarter-final stages by Killygarry. Ballinagh GAA beat the Gaels in the 2013 Cavan Senior Football Championship, before finally regaining the championship against Kingscourt Stars in 2014.

== Club crest ==
The club crest came into existence in 1984 when all clubs in the country were asked as part of the GAA's centenary year to design their own club crest. Central to the crest is the Fransciscan Abbey, a landmark in Cavan Town and the interlocking of the letters H and S which illustrate the merging of the two existing town clubs, Cavan Harps and Cavan Slashers into one town club, Cavan Gaels in 1957.

== Notable people ==
Gaels players to have played on the senior Cavan county team include P. J. Carroll, Martin Dunne, Luke Fortune, Seánie Johnston, Micheál Lyng and Niall Murray. Former player and club member Micheal Graham managed the senior county team to a Tailteann Cup final. Brian Crowe, who refereed the 2006 All-Ireland SFC final, is also a club member.

== Achievements ==
- Cavan Senior Football Championship (14): 1965, 1975, 1977, 1978, 2001, 2003, 2004, 2005, 2007, 2008, 2009, 2011, 2014, 2017
- Cavan Senior Hurling Championship (5): 1973, 1974, 1983, 1984 & 1985
- Cavan Intermediate Football Championship (1): 1976
- Cavan Under-21 Football Championship (5): 2000, 2001, 2004, 2012 & 2016
- Cavan Minor Football Championship (18) 1967, 1968, 1978, 1987, 1991, 1998, 1999, 2000, 2001, 2002, 2003, 2004, 2006, 2007, 2008, 2010, 2023.
