= Castlerahan GAA =

Gaelic football club of County Cavan, Ireland

- Caisleán an Rathain
- Founded: 1961
- County: Cavan
- Colours: Maroon and White
- Grounds: Fay Park, Ballyjamesduff

Playing kits
Standard colours

Senior Club Championships
| | All Ireland | Ulster champions | Cavan champions |
|---|---|---|---|
| Football: | 0 | 0 | 2 |

Castlerahan is a Gaelic football club from Ballyjamesduff, County Cavan, Ireland. They take their name from the Castlerahan barony in which Ballyjamesduff is located.

== History ==
The club was founded in its current state in 1961, Ballyjamesduff and Castlerahan fielding separate teams prior to then. The club reached its first Senior Championship final in 1968, losing to Crosserlough.

In 2011, the club reached its first senior final since 1968. They lost the final heavily to Cavan Gaels. It was four years before Castlerahan reached another county final against Kingscourt Stars in 2015. Castlerahan came up one point short on that occasion. Castlerahan lost further finals to neighbours Ramor United after a replay in 2016, and to Cavan Gaels again in 2017.

Castlerahan played in their fourth consecutive final in 2018, facing Crosserlough. Having been six points down, they staged a comeback to win by a point and finally win their first senior championship. Castlerahan successfully defended their title in 2019 by defeating Ramor United.

After being relegated in 2021, Castlerahan won the 2022 Intermediate Championship title to seal a quick return to the senior grade.

== Honours ==
- Cavan Senior Football Championship: 2
  - 2018, 2019
- Cavan Intermediate Football Championship: 3
  - 1966, 2001, 2022
- Cavan Junior Football Championship: 5
  - 1951, 1959, 1965, 1987, 1991
- Cavan Under-21 Football Championship: 2
  - 2006, 2007
- Cavan Minor Football Championship: 2
  - 2005, 2012

== Notable players ==
- Cian Mackey
- John Nallen
