= Cavan Senior Football Championship =

Annual Gaelic football competition

- Current season or competition: 2026 Cavan Senior Football Championship
- Code: Gaelic football
- Founded: 1888
- Region: County Cavan, Ireland (GAA)
- Trophy: Oliver Plunkett Cup
- No. of teams: 12
- Title holders: Gowna (10th title)
- Most titles: Cornafean (20 titles)
- Sponsors: Kyte Powertech
- Official website: http://www.cavangaa.ie

The Cavan Senior Football Championship is an annual Gaelic football competition organised by Cavan GAA. It is played between the twelve top-graded clubs in County Cavan. It was first competed for in 1888. The winners are awarded the Oliver Plunkett Cup and go on to represent Cavan in the Ulster Senior Club Football Championship.

Cornafean are the most successful club, having won the competition twenty times, most recently in 1956. Crosserlough won a record seven consecutive titles between 1966 and 1972. The current champions are Gowna who beat Kingscourt Stars in the 2026 final to win their tenth title.

== Format ==
12 teams contest the Kyte Powertech Senior Football Championship. The championship is run on a league basis up to the quarter-final stage with all teams put into one league table. Each team plays four games with the fixtures decided by a random draw at the conclusion of each round. No team can meet each other twice in the league stage. The top eight teams in the league progress to the quarter-finals while the bottom four teams enter the relegation play-offs with one team to be relegated to the Cavan Intermediate Football Championship.

== List of finals ==
Key to list of winners
†	Winning team reached the final of the Ulster Senior Club Football Championship

List of Cavan Senior Football Championship finals
Year	Winners	Score	Opponent	Ref.
1888	Maghera MacFinns	1–4 – 0–1	Ballyconnell	
1889	No Championship			
1890	Cavan Slashers			
1891	No Championship			
1892	No Championship			
1893	No Championship			
1894	No Championship			
1895	No Championship			
1896	No Championship			
1897	No Championship			
1898	No Championship			
1899	No Championship			
1900	No Championship			
1901	No Championship			
1902	Cavan Slashers			
1903	Drumlane			
1904	Drumlane			
1905	Drumlane			
1906	No Championship			
1907	Drumlane			
1908	Lacken	0–7 – 0–3	Lavey	
1909	Cornafean		Crosserlough	
1910	Cornafean			
1911	Bailieborough Shamrocks			
1912	Cornafean			
1913	Cornafean			
1914	Cornafean			
1915	Cornafean			
1916	Virginia Blues			
1917	Cavan Slashers			
1918	Cornafean		Crosserlough	
1919	Virginia Blues			
1920	Cornafean			
1921	Kingscourt Stars		Bruskey	
1922	Cavan Slashers			
1923	Templeport	3–2 – 2–2	Cornafean	
1924	Cavan Slashers	2–1 – 0–5	Bailieborough Shamrocks	
1925	Cavan Slashers	1–3 – 0–4	Cornafean	
1926	Maghera MacFinns	2–1 – 2–0	Gowna	
1927	Cavan Slashers	1–5 – 0–4	Virginia Blues	
1928	Cornafean	1–3 – 0–3	Maghera MacFinns	
1929	Cornafean	2–5 – 2–2	Cavan Slashers	
1930	Cavan Slashers	1–4 – 0–4	Cornafean	
1931	Cavan Slashers	3–4 – 0–8	Cornafean	
1932	Cornafean	5–5 – 0–2	Bailieborough Shamrocks	
1933	Cornafean	4–1 – 0–3	Cavan Slashers	
1934	Cornafean	3–5 – 0–2	Bailieborough Shamrocks	
1935	Mullahoran	2–5 – 1–3	Cornafean	
1936	Cornafean	3–6 – 0–3	Cavan Slashers	
1937	Cornafean	2–4 – 1–7	Bailieborough Shamrocks	
1937	Cornafean	0–5 – 0–1 (R)	Bailieborough Shamrocks	
1938	Cornafean	2–6 – 0–5	Gowna	
1939	Cornafean	1–6 – 1–5	Killinkere	
1940	Cornafean	1–4 – 0–3	Killinkere	
1941	Cavan Slashers	1–4 – 1–3	Cornafean	
1942	Mullahoran	1–8 – 0–10	Cornafean	
1943	Cornafean	3–7 – 2–4	Mullahoran	
1944	Mullahoran	1–6 – 1–4	Mountnugent	
1945	Mullahoran	3–8 – 1–4	Bailieborough Shamrocks	
1946	Mountnugent	0–9 – 2–3	Bailieborough Shamrocks	
1946	Mountnugent	0–6 – 0–5 (R)	Bailieborough Shamrocks	
1947	Mullahoran	1–6 – 1–4	Cross	
1948	Mullahoran	3–5 – 2–5	Bailieborough Shamrocks	
1949	Mullahoran	3–11 – 0–2	Cornafaen	
1950	Mullahoran			
1951	Lavey	0–9 – 0–7	Mullagh	
1952	Bailieborough Shamrocks	1–8 – 0–4	Munterconnaught	
1953	Cootehill	3–5 – 0–3	Cornafean	
1954	Cootehill	1–13 – 1–3	Mullahoran	
1955	Cootehill	3–9 – 1–5	Kingscourt Stars	
1956	Cornafean	4–2 – 1–7	Bailieborough Shamrocks	
1957	Bailieborough Shamrocks	0–9 – 0–8	Cootehill	
1958	Crosserlough	3–7 – 3–4	Cavan Gaels	
1959	Virginia Blues	3–3 – 1–6	Crosserlough	
1960	Final not played			
1961	Crosserlough	2–8 – 2–3	Ballinagh	
1962	Virginia Blues	0–9 – 1–6	Bailieborough Shamrocks	
1962	Virginia Blues	1–8 – 2–4 (R)	Bailieborough Shamrocks	
1963	Mullahoran	1–6 – 1–6	Bailieborough Shamrocks	
1963	Mullahoran	1–10 – 0–3 (R)	Bailieborough Shamrocks	
1964	Bailieborough Shamrocks	3–8 – 1–4	Cootehill	
1965	Cavan Gaels	3–5 – 1–10	Bailieborough Shamrocks	
1966	Crosserlough	3–13 – 0–0	Ballyconnell	
1967	Crosserlough	0–18 – 3–5	Cavan Gaels	
1968	Crosserlough	2–6 – 0–8	Castlerahan	
1969	Crosserlough †	1–9 – 0–4	St Joseph's (Arva/Killeshandra)	
1970	Crosserlough	1–12 – 0–5	Cavan Gaels	
1971	Crosserlough	1–12 – 1–4	Killygarry	
1972	Crosserlough	3–8 – 2–6	St Brigid's (Laragh/Stradone)	
1973	Annagh (Redhills/Belturbet)	4–11 – 3–8	Ramor United (Virginia/Maghera)	
1974	Ramor United (Virginia/Maghera)	1–11 – 0–7	Woodford Gaels (Templeport/Kildallan)	
1975	Cavan Gaels	1–11 – 2–8	Crosserlough	
1975	Cavan Gaels	1–11 – 0–8 (R)	Crosserlough	
1976	St Mary's (Castlerahan/Munterconnaught)	0–12 – 0–9	Ballyhaise	
1977	Cavan Gaels †	3–12 – 1–6	St Mary's (Castlerahan/Munterconnaught)	
1978	Cavan Gaels	1–10 – 0–6	Ballyhaise	
1979	Laragh United	3–14 – 1–7	Crosserlough	
1980	Kingscourt Stars	0–10 – 0–9	Crosserlough	
1981	Kingscourt Stars	1–8 – 0–11	Drumalee	
1981	Kingscourt Stars	1–10 – 0–4 (R)	Drumalee	
1982	Laragh United	1–10 – 1–3	Bailieborough Shamrocks	
1983	Laragh United	1–15 – 2–6	Cavan Gaels	
1984	Laragh United	0–16 – 2–7	Drumalee	
1985	Ramor United	3–10 – 0–7	Kingscourt Stars	
1986	Kingscourt Stars	2–12 – 0–6	Ballinagh	
1987	Kingscourt Stars †	1–8 – 0–6	Ramor United	
1988	Gowna	1–6 – 0–3	Laragh United	
1989	Kingscourt Stars	1–11 – 0–8	Ramor United	
1990	Kingscourt Stars †	1–12 – 0–9	Mullahoran	
1991	Kingscourt Stars	3–11 – 0–10	Crosserlough	
1992	Ramor United	1–9 – 0–11	Bailieborough Shamrocks	
1993	Kingscourt Stars	2–8 – 0–8	Gowna	
1994	Gowna	1–8 – 0–9	Mullahoran	
1995	Bailieborough Shamrocks †	0–13 – 1–8	Gowna	
1996	Gowna	1–14 – 1–8	Mullahoran	
1997	Gowna	3–12 – 2–6	Crosserlough	
1998	Mullahoran	2–5 – 0–4	Cavan Gaels	
1999	Gowna	0–11 – 1–7	Kingscourt Stars	
2000	Gowna	2–10 – 0–11	Cavan Gaels	
2001	Cavan Gaels	0–15 – 0–7	Gowna	
2002	Gowna	1–17 – 0–8	Cavan Gaels	
2003	Cavan Gaels	3–6 – 1–8	Mullahoran	
2004	Cavan Gaels	1–9 – 0–7	Mullahoran	
2005	Cavan Gaels	0–12 – 1–6	Mullahoran	
2006	Mullahoran	2–10 – 0–10	Cavan Gaels	
2007	Cavan Gaels	0–15 – 0–11	Gowna	
2008	Cavan Gaels	0–15 – 0–7	Denn	
2009	Cavan Gaels	1–20 – 2–11	Denn	
2010	Kingscourt Stars	1–13 – 1–9	Cavan Gaels	
2011	Cavan Gaels	4–11 – 0–7	Castlerahan	
2012	Mullahoran	1–8 – 1–8	Kingscourt Stars	
2012	Mullahoran	1–8 – 0–7 (R)	Kingscourt Stars	
2013	Ballinagh	0–12 – 0–11	Cavan Gaels	
2014	Cavan Gaels	0–16 – 0–15	Kingscourt Stars	
2015	Kingscourt Stars	1–9 – 0–11	Castlerahan	
2016	Ramor United	2–11 – 3–8	Castlerahan	
2016	Ramor United	0–10 – 0–8 (R)	Castlerahan	
2017	Cavan Gaels †	0–13 – 0–8	Castlerahan	
2018	Castlerahan	2–11 – 1–13	Crosserlough	
2019	Castlerahan	1–9 – 0–10	Ramor United	
2020	Crosserlough	2–12 – 2–12	Kingscourt Stars	
2020	Crosserlough	0–13 – 0–8 (R)	Kingscourt Stars	
2021	Ramor United	0–10 – 0–10	Gowna	
2021	Ramor United	1–15 – 0–14 (R)	Gowna	
2022	Gowna	2–13 – 1–9	Killygarry	
2023	Gowna	5–15 – 0–13	Kingscourt Stars	
2024	Crosserlough	2–6 – 0–4	Ramor United	
2025	Kingscourt Stars	2–16 – 0–13	Gowna	
2026	Gowna	4–17 – 0–14	Kingscourt Stars	

== Performances by club ==
Performances in the Cavan Senior Football Championship by club
Club	Titles	Years won
Cornafean	20	1909, 1910, 1912, 1913, 1914, 1915, 1918, 1920, 1928, 1929, 1932, 1933, 1934, 1936, 1937, 1938, 1939, 1940, 1943, 1956
Cavan Gaels	14	1965, 1975, 1977, 1978, 2001, 2003, 2004, 2005, 2007, 2008, 2009, 2011, 2014, 2017
Mullahoran	12	1935, 1942, 1944, 1945, 1947, 1948, 1949, 1950, 1963, 1998, 2006, 2012
Kingscourt Stars	12	1921, 1980, 1981, 1986, 1987, 1989, 1990, 1991, 1993, 2010, 2015, 2025
Crosserlough	11	1958, 1961, 1966, 1967, 1968, 1969, 1970, 1971, 1972, 2020, 2024
Gowna	10	1988, 1994, 1996, 1997, 1999, 2000, 2002, 2022, 2023, 2026
Cavan Slashers	9	1890, 1917, 1922, 1924, 1925, 1927, 1930, 1931, 1941
Bailieborough Shamrocks	5	1911, 1952, 1957, 1964, 1995
Ramor United	5	1974, 1985, 1992, 2016, 2021
Drumlane	4	1903, 1904, 1905, 1907
Virginia Blues	4	1916, 1919, 1959, 1962
Laragh United	4	1979, 1982, 1983, 1984
Cootehill	3	1953, 1954, 1955
Maghera MacFinns	2	1888, 1926
Castlerahan	2	2018, 2019
Lacken	1	1908
Templeport	1	1923
Mountnugent	1	1946
Lavey	1	1951
Annagh	1	1973
St Mary's	1	1976
Ballinagh	1	2013
