= Denn GFC =

Cavan-based Gaelic games club

Denn
- An Dinn
- Founded: 1969
- County: Cavan
- Nickname: The Denn Dan O’Connells
- Colours: Maroon and White
- Grounds: St.Matthews Park, Crosskeys, County Cavan

Playing kits
Home	Away

Senior Club Championships
	All Ireland	Ulster champions	Cavan champions
Football:	-	-	-
Camogie:	-	-	1

Denn, Daniel O'Connells GAA is a Gaelic Athletic Association club based in the village of Crosskeys, County Cavan, Ireland. They are affiliated with Cavan GAA. The club was founded in 1969 following the merging of the two clubs in the parish, Drumavaddy & Crosskeys.

== History ==
=== Foundation and early success ===
Denn GAA was founded in 1969 following the merger of Drumavaddy and Crosskeys, the two clubs in the parish. The club secured its first adult county title in 1982, winning Division 3 of the All-County Football League. In 1984, the GAA's centenary year, Denn won their first championship, defeating Mountnugent in the Cavan Junior Football Championship final.

Promotion from Division 2 followed in 1986, allowing Denn to compete in the top division of Cavan league football for the first time in 1987. The club won the Cavan Intermediate Football Championship in 1988 and made its Senior Championship debut in 1989, reaching the quarter-finals. Following a restructuring of the county's championship grades, Denn returned to intermediate level in 1990 and won the title again that year.

Denn remained at senior level until relegation in 1995. After defeats in four intermediate finals, the club secured its third Intermediate Championship title in 2003. During this period, Denn also won the All-County Football League Division 1 title in 1998.

=== Senior finals and provincial success ===
Denn reached the Cavan Senior Football Championship final for the first time in 2008 and returned to the final in 2009, losing to Cavan Gaels on both occasions.

The club reached the 2020 Cavan Junior Football Championship final, which was delayed until August 2021, when Denn lost to Templeport. Two months later, Denn won the 2021 championship, defeating Drung by 2–11 to 1–7 in the final. It was the club's second Junior Championship title.

Victories over Antrim's Naomh Comhghall and Derry's Desertmartin brought Denn into the Ulster Junior Club Football Championship final. Denn secured their first provincial title with a seven-point victory over Donegal champions Na Dúnaibh.

In January 2022, Denn defeated Manchester's St Brendan's to advance to the All-Ireland Junior Club Football Championship semi-final. Their campaign ended with defeat to Kerry champions Gneeveguilla.

=== Minor championship success ===
In 2026, Denn won the Cavan Under-18 Division 1 Football Championship, defeating Butlersbridge by 1–22 to 1–11 in the final at Kingspan Breffni. An evenly contested first half saw Butlersbridge take the lead shortly before the interval, but Denn responded to lead by 0–13 to 1–8 at half-time. Denn took control in the second half, holding Butlersbridge scoreless for the final 22 minutes and pulling away to secure an eleven-point victory.

=== Grounds development ===
Denn's home ground is St Matthew's Park in Crosskeys. By the club's fiftieth anniversary year in 2019, redevelopment of the grounds had provided a new pitch, stand and dressing rooms.

== Camogie ==
Denn fields Camogie teams at all levels, from underage to Minor and Senior. The club has enjoyed remarkable success over the years, winning the Junior Camogie Championship in 2016 and the Intermediate Championship in 2019. That same year, they were crowned Ulster Junior B winners, reached the All-Ireland Final, and were named Anglo-Celt Team of the Year. Most recently, Denn captured the 2024 Cavan Senior Camogie Championship with a thrilling victory over their neighbours and rivals Crosserlough, adding another chapter to their history.

== Honours ==
- Cavan Senior Football Championship: 0
  - Runners-up 2008, 2009
- Cavan Intermediate Football Championship: 3
  - 1988, 1990, 2003
- Ulster Junior Club Football Championship: 1
  - 2021
- Cavan Junior Football Championship: 2
  - 1984, 2021
- Cavan Minor Football Championship: 6
  - 1950(1), 1952(1), 2005(4), 2006(3), 2015(3) 2026(1)

=== Camogie ===
- Cavan Senior Camogie Championship: 1
  - 2024
- Cavan Intermediate Camogie Championship: 1
  - 2019
- Ulster Junior B Club Camogie Championship: 1
  - 2019
- Cavan Junior Camogie Championship: 1
  - 2016

== Notable players ==
- Donal Keogan – former Cavan senior footballer and former manager of the Cavan senior and minor teams.
- Patrick Gaffney – former Ireland International Rules Masters representative. The Paddy Gaffney Cup, contested between Ireland and Australia at Masters level, is named in his memory.
- Thomas Smith – former Cavan senior footballer and hurler. He played in the 1995 Ulster Senior Football Championship final, scoring a point against Tyrone.
- Hubert Smith – former Cavan senior footballer.
- Padraig McGovern – Denn footballer selected for the inaugural TG4 Underdogs football team in 2003, lining out against the Dublin senior football team.
- Martin Cahill – former Cavan senior footballer and Cavan captain, captain of Denn during their run to the 2008 Cavan Senior Football Championship final and named Cavan Senior Club Player of the Year in 2008.
- Tomás Corr – former Cavan senior inter-county footballer.
- Thomas Edward Donohoe – Cavan senior footballer and member of Cavan's 2020 Ulster Senior Football Championship-winning panel. Also a MacRory Cup winner with St Patrick's College, Cavan and Sigerson Cup winner with DCU.
- Shanise Fitzsimons – Cavan camogie player and 2026 Irish News Camogie All-Star.
