= Kingscourt Stars GAA =

Cavan-based Gaelic games club

Kingscourt Stars
- CLG Réaltaí Dún na Rí
- Founded: 1890
- County: Cavan
- Nickname: The Stars
- Colours: Blue and White
- Grounds: O'Raghallaigh Park
- Coordinates: 53°54′26″N 6°48′05″W

Playing kits
Standard colours

Senior Club Championships
	All Ireland	Ulster champions	Cavan champions
Football:	0	0	12

Kingscourt Stars is a Gaelic Athletic Association club from Kingscourt, County Cavan in Ireland. They are affiliated to Cavan GAA. The club was founded in 1890. They are the third most successful team in Cavan GAA history, winning 12 Senior Championships, their latest occurring in 2025.

The club plays at O'Raghallaigh Park which was built between 1950 and 1951. The ground is named for the Ó Raghallaigh (O'Reilly) clan who formerly ruled East Breifne, as well as the nationalist leader The O'Rahilly (1875–1916) and local Catholic priest Fr Peter O'Reilly who was behind the construction of the Church of the Immaculate Conception in Kingscourt.

== Notable players ==
- Padraig Faulkner
- Victor Sherlock

== Honours ==
- Cavan Senior Football Championship (12): 1921, 1980, 1981, 1986, 1987, 1989, 1990, 1991, 1993, 2010, 2015, 2025
- Cavan Intermediate Football Championship (1): 1976
- Cavan Junior Football Championship (3): 1931, 1954, 1961
- Cavan Under-21 Football Championship (2): 1979, 1982
- Cavan Minor Football Championship (4): 1957, 1982, 1997*, 2011*, 2024 (*O'Raghallaigh Gaels (Kingscourt/Shercock))
