= 2018 Cavan Intermediate Football Championship =

2018 Cavan IFC
Tournament details
- County: Cavan
- Province: Ulster
- Year: 2018
- Trophy: Tommy Gilroy Cup
- Sponsor: Hotel Kilmore
- Date: 3 August - 14 October 2018
- Teams: 14

Winners
- Champions: Mullahoran (2nd win)
- Manager: Seanie Smith
- Captain: Killian Brady
- Qualify for: 2018 Ulster Club IFC

Runners-up
- Runners-up: Cuchulainns
- Manager: Niall Lynch
- Captain: Adrian Taite

Promotion/Relegation
- Promoted team(s): Mullahoran
- Relegated team(s): Redhills

Other
- Player of the Year: Killian Brady (Mullahoran)

The 2018 Cavan Intermediate Football Championship was the 54th edition of Cavan GAA's premier Gaelic football tournament for intermediate graded clubs in County Cavan, Ireland. The tournament consists of 14 teams, with the winner representing Cavan in the Ulster Intermediate Club Football Championship.

The championship starts with a league stage and then progresses to a knock out stage.

The draw for the group stages of the championship were made on 30 April 2018.

Mullahoran won the championship, beating Cuchulainns in the final.

== Team changes ==
The following teams have changed division since the 2017 championship season.

=== To Championship ===
Promoted from 2017 Cavan Junior Football Championship

- Ballymachugh (Junior Champions)

Relegated from 2017 Cavan Senior Football Championship

- Arva
- Cuchulainns
- Mullahoran

=== From Championship ===
Promoted to 2018 Cavan Senior Football Championship

- Shercock (Intermediate Champions)

Relegated to 2018 Cavan Junior Football Championship

- Denn
- Drumlane
- Killinkere

== League stage ==
All 14 teams enter the competition at this stage. A random draw determines which teams face each other in each of the four rounds. No team can meet each other twice in the group stage. The top 8 teams go into a seeded draw for the quarter-finals while the bottom 6 teams will enter a Relegation Playoff.

| Pos | Team | Pld | W | L | D | PD | Pts |
|---|---|---|---|---|---|---|---|
| 1 | Laragh United | 4 | 4 | 0 | 0 | +20 | 8 |
| 2 | Arva | 4 | 3 | 1 | 0 | +25 | 6 |
| 3 | Cuchulainns | 4 | 3 | 1 | 0 | +19 | 6 |
| 4 | Mullahoran | 4 | 3 | 1 | 0 | +17 | 6 |
| 5 | Belturbet | 4 | 3 | 1 | 0 | +6 | 6 |
| 6 | Killeshandra | 4 | 2 | 2 | 0 | +1 | 4 |
| 7 | Butlersbridge | 4 | 2 | 2 | 0 | -4 | 4 |
| 8 | Bailieborough | 4 | 2 | 2 | 0 | -7 | 4 |
| 9 | Drumgoon | 4 | 2 | 2 | 0 | -14 | 4 |
| 10 | Ballyhaise | 4 | 1 | 2 | 1 | 0 | 3 |
| 11 | Redhills | 4 | 1 | 3 | 0 | +4 | 2 |
| 12 | Ballymachugh | 4 | 1 | 3 | 0 | -20 | 2 |
| 13 | Cornafean | 4 | 0 | 3 | 1 | -14 | 1 |
| 14 | Swanlinbar | 4 | 0 | 4 | 0 | -33 | 0 |

=== Round 1 ===
| 3 August 2018 Round 1 | Swanlinbar | 1-14 – 4-20 | Redhills | Páirc Emmet |
| | | | | Referee: Gerry Sheridan |

| 3 August 2018 Round 1 | Arva | 5-16 – 1-9 | Drumgoon | Our Lady of Lourdes Park |
| | | | | Referee: Padraig Sheridan |

| 4 August 2018 Round 1 | Killeshandra | 3-5 – 1-14 | Mullahoran | Joe Crowe Park |
| | | | | Referee: Ollie Donohoe |

| 5 August 2018 Round 1 | Cuchulainns | 3-14 – 2-12 | Cornafean | Lavey GAA Grounds |
| | | | | Referee: Joey Curley |

| 5 August 2018 Round 1 | Belturbet | 0-9 – 1-12 | Ballyhaise | St Felim's Park |
| | | | | Referee: Kieran McCarville |

| 5 August 2018 Round 1 | Ballymachugh | 0-10 – 2-17 | Laragh United | Our Lady of Lourdes Park |
| | | | | Referee: Packie Smith |

| 5 August 2018 Round 1 | Bailieborough | 1-6 – 1-12 | Butlersbridge | Hugh O'Reilly Memorial Park |
| | | | | Referee: Conor Dourneen |

=== Round 2 ===
| 10 August 2018 Round 2 | Bailieborough | 3-7 – 1-12 | Mullahoran | St Felim's Park |
| | | | | Referee: Chris McCaffrey |

| 11 August 2018 Round 2 | Drumgoon | 2-11 – 3-10 | Ballymachugh | Athletic Grounds |
| | | | | Referee: Bartley Gilsenan |

| 11 August 2018 Round 2 | Belturbet | 2-11 – 3-3 | Killeshandra | O'Connell Park |
| | | | | Referee: Martin Sexton |

| 12 August 2018 Round 2 | Laragh United | 2-12 – 1-12 | Redhills | Páirc Emmet |
| | | | | Referee: Oliver Óg O'Reilly |

| 12 August 2018 Round 2 | Ballyhaise | 0-12 – 0-12 | Cornafean | Our Lady of Lourdes Park |
| | | | | Referee: Gerry Sheridan |

| 12 August 2018 Round 2 | Butlersbridge | 1-12 – 5-14 | Cuchulainns | P. J. Duke Park |
| | | | | Referee: Ollie Donohoe |

| 12 August 2018 Round 2 | Swanlinbar | 3-11 – 3-14 | Arva | St Aidan's Park |
| | | | | Referee: James Clarke |

=== Round 3 ===
| 24 August 2018 Round 3 | Bailieborough | 2-6 – 1-15 | Arva | Edwin Carolan Community Park |
| | | | | Referee: Joey Curley |

| 25 August 2018 Round 3 | Swanlinbar | 0-10 – 1-13 | Butlersbridge | St Aidan's Park |
| | | | | Referee: Jim Giblin |

| 26 August 2018 Round 3 | Cornafean | 1-10 – 2-12 | Killeshandra | Ballinagh GAA Grounds |
| | | | | Referee: Stephen McKiernan |

| 26 August 2018 Round 3 | Redhills | 1-8 – 1-12 | Belturbet | Hugh O'Reilly Memorial Park |
| | | | | Referee: Joe McQuillan |

| 26 August 2018 Round 3 | Ballymachugh | 1-7 – 1-13 | Mullahoran | Gowna GAA Grounds |
| | | | | Referee: James Clarke |

| 26 August 2018 Round 3 | Cuchulainns | 0-12 – 0-13 | Laragh United | Dolan Park |
| | | | | Referee: Martin Sexton |

| 26 August 2018 Round 3 | Ballyhaise | 0-11 – 1-13 | Drumgoon | Hugh O'Reilly Memorial Park |
| | | | | Referee: Thomas Doonan |

=== Round 4 ===
| 8 September 2018 Round 4 | Cornafean | 2-5 – 2-9 | Bailieborough | Lavey GAA Grounds |
| | | | | Referee: Oliver Óg O'Reilly |

| 8 September 2018 Round 4 | Killeshandra | 2-10 – 2-6 | Redhills | First Ulster Park |
| | | | | Referee: Jimmy Galligan |

| 8 September 2018 Round 4 | Swanlinbar | 1-2 – 1-11 | Mullahoran | O'Connell Park |
| | | | | Referee: Barry McMenamin |

| 8 September 2018 Round 4 | Arva | 1-16 – 2-16 | Laragh United | Ballinagh GAA Grounds |
| | | | | Referee: Martin Brady |

| 8 September 2018 Round 4 | Drumgoon | 0-11 – 0-9 | Butlersbridge | Terry Coyle Park |
| | | | | Referee: John Power |

| 8 September 2018 Round 4 | Ballymachugh | 1-7 – 1-10 | Belturbet | Athletic Grounds |
| | | | | Referee: Packie Smith |

| 8 September 2018 Round 4 | Ballyhaise | 0-12 – 1-10 | Cuchulainns | Dr. Plunkett Memorial Park |
| | | | | Referee: Kieran McCarville |

== Knock-Out Stage ==
Quarter-finals
Cuchulainns | 0-14
Killeshandra | 1-10
Laragh United | 1-11; 2-14 (R)
Bailieborough | 3-5; 1-10 (R)
Mullahoran | 1-13; 2-13 (R)
Belturbet | 1-13; 0-12 (R)
Arva | 0-14
Butlersbridge | 1-13

Semi-finals
Cuchulainns | 2-9
Laragh United | 0-13
Mullahoran | 2-12
Butlersbridge | 1-6

Final
Cuchulainns | 0-8
Mullahoran | 2-16

=== Quarter-finals ===
| 14 September 2018 Quarter-final | Laragh United | 1-11 – 3-5 | Bailieborough | O'Raghallaigh Park |
| | | | | Referee: Noel Mooney |

| 14 September 2018 Quarter-final | Arva | 0-14 – 1-13 | Butlersbridge | St Aidan's Park |
| | | | | Referee: Martin Sexton |

| 15 September 2018 Quarter-final | Mullahoran | 1-13 – 1-13 | Belturbet | Ballinagh GAA Grounds |
| | | | | Referee: Joe McQuillan |

| 16 September 2018 Quarter-final | Cuchulainns | 0-14 – 1-10 | Killeshandra | Dr. Plunkett Memorial Park |
| | | | | Referee: Harry Conaty |

| 22 September 2018 Quarter-final replay | Bailieborough | 1-10 – 2-14 | Laragh United | Dolan Park |
| | | | | Referee: Gerry Sheridan |

| 22 September 2018 Quarter-final replay | Belturbet | 0-12 – 2-13 | Mullahoran | Ballinagh GAA Grounds |
| | | | | Referee: Noel Mooney |

=== Semi-finals ===
| 29 September 2018 Semi-final | Cuchulainns | 2-9 – 0-13 | Laragh United | St Matthew's Park |
| | | | | Referee: Noel Mooney |

| 29 September 2018 Semi-final | Mullahoran | 2-12 – 1-6 | Butlersbridge | Joe Crowe Park |
| | | | | Referee: Pat Clarke |

=== Final ===
| 14 October 2018 Final | Cuchulainns | 0-8 – 2-16 | Mullahoran | Breffni Park |
| | Eugene Keating 0-4 (0-2f), Evan Doughty 0-1 (0-1f), Ruairi O'Connell 0-1, Eoghan Donoghue 0-1, Conor Smith 0-1 | Report | Cormac O'Reilly 1-4 (0-2f), Philip Brady 1-2, Enda O'Reilly 0-5 (0-4f), Gavan Brady 0-2, Matthew Hynes 0-1, Shane Sheils 0-1, Sean McKeogh 0-1 | Referee: Margaret Farrelly; Man of the Match: Cormac O'Reilly (Mullahoran) |

== Relegation play-offs ==
The teams placed 8-14 in the league phase will play off against each other. The 3 winners will maintain their intermediate status for 2019. One loser will go straight to a relegation final while the other 2 losers will face off in a relegation semi-final. The ultimate loser will be relegated to the 2019 Junior Championship.

| 21 September 2018 Relegation Quarter-final | Ballyhaise | 0-13 – 1-11 | Cornafean | St Aidan's Park |
| | | | | Referee: Michael Lee |

| 22 September 2018 Relegation Quarter-final | Drumgoon | 4-11 – 3-18 | Swanlinbar | O'Connell Park |
| | | | | Referee: James Clarke |

| 23 September 2018 Relegation Semi-final | Redhills | 1-4 – 4-11 | Ballymachugh | Lavey GAA Grounds |
| | | | | Referee: Tony Gregory |

| 28 September 2018 Relegation Semi-final | Drumgoon | 2-10 – 1-9 | Ballyhaise | O'Raghallaigh Park |
| | | | | Referee: Tony Gregory |

| 7 October 2018 Relegation Final | Redhills | 0-4 – 0-9 | Ballyhaise | P. J. Duke Park |
| | | | | Referee: Jim Giblin |
