= 2025 Cavan Intermediate Football Championship =

2025 O'Reilly Precast Cavan Intermediate Football Championship
Tournament details
- County: Cavan
- Province: Ulster
- Year: 2025
- Trophy: Tommy Gilroy Cup
- Sponsor: O'Reilly Precast
- Date: 24 July – 5 October 2025
- Teams: 14

Winners
- Champions: Cuchulainns (4th win)
- Manager: Niall Lynch
- Captain: Philip Smyth
- Qualify for: Ulster Club IFC

Runners-up
- Runners-up: Butlersbridge
- Manager: Keelan Melaniff
- Captain: Diarmuid McCorry

Promotion/Relegation
- Promoted team(s): Cuchulainns
- Relegated team(s): Lacken

The 2025 Cavan Intermediate Football Championship was the 61st edition of Cavan GAA's premier Gaelic football tournament for intermediate graded clubs in County Cavan, Ireland. The tournament consists of 14 teams, with the winner representing Cavan in the Ulster Intermediate Club Football Championship. The championship began on 24 July 2025.

Cuchulainns won their first title since 2005 with a six-point win over Butlersbridge in the final.

== Team changes ==
The following teams have changed division since the 2024 championship season.

=== To Championship ===
Promoted from 2024 Cavan Junior Football Championship

- Knockbride (Junior Champions)

Relegated from 2024 Cavan Senior Football Championship

- Lavey (Relegation play-off losers)

=== From Championship ===
Promoted to 2025 Cavan Senior Football Championship

- Arva (Intermediate Champions)

Relegated to 2025 Cavan Junior Football Championship

- Templeport (Relegation play-off losers)

== League stage ==
All 14 teams enter the competition at this stage. A random draw determines which teams face each other in each of the four rounds. No team can meet each other twice in the group stage. The top eight teams go into the quarter-finals, while the bottom four teams enter the relegation play-offs. The first round draw took place on 13 May 2024.

| Pos | Team | Pld | W | D | L | PF | PA | PD | Pts | Qualification |
|---|---|---|---|---|---|---|---|---|---|---|
| 1 | Cuchulainns | 4 | 4 | 0 | 0 | 93 | 68 | +25 | 8 | Advance to quarter-final |
| 2 | Bailieborough Shamrocks | 4 | 3 | 1 | 0 | 74 | 55 | +19 | 7 | Advance to quarter-final |
| 3 | Cootehill | 4 | 3 | 1 | 0 | 70 | 51 | +19 | 7 | Advance to quarter-final |
| 4 | Killinkere | 4 | 3 | 0 | 1 | 70 | 59 | +11 | 6 | Advance to quarter-final |
| 5 | Ballymachugh | 4 | 3 | 0 | 1 | 64 | 60 | +4 | 6 | Advance to quarter-final |
| 6 | Cornafean | 4 | 3 | 0 | 1 | 72 | 69 | +3 | 6 | Advance to quarter-final |
| 7 | Butlersbridge | 4 | 2 | 1 | 1 | 72 | 64 | +8 | 5 | Advance to quarter-final |
| 8 | Denn | 4 | 2 | 0 | 2 | 84 | 75 | +9 | 4 | Advance to quarter-final |
| 9 | Knockbride | 4 | 1 | 1 | 2 | 67 | 79 | −12 | 3 | |
| 10 | Lavey | 4 | 1 | 0 | 3 | 58 | 74 | −16 | 2 | |
| 11 | Lacken | 4 | 1 | 0 | 3 | 60 | 83 | −23 | 2 | Advance to relegation play-offs |
| 12 | Drumlane | 4 | 0 | 0 | 4 | 66 | 80 | −14 | 0 | Advance to relegation play-offs |
| 13 | Drumgoon | 4 | 0 | 0 | 4 | 61 | 75 | −14 | 0 | Advance to relegation play-offs |
| 14 | Shercock | 4 | 0 | 0 | 4 | 69 | 88 | −19 | 0 | Advance to relegation play-offs |

Source: Cavan GAA

=== Round 1 ===
| 24 July 2025 Round 1 | Lavey | 0–15 – 3–10 | Cuchulainns | Dolan Park |
| 20:00 | | Report | | Referee: John Power |

| 24 July 2025 Round 1 | Cootehill | 1–14 – 0–13 | Drumlane | Max McGrath Memorial Park |
| 20:00 | | | | Referee: James Clarke |

| 25 July 2025 Round 1 | Knockbride | 1–13 – 2–13 | Cornafean | Kingspan Breffni |
| 20:00 | | | | Referee: Michael Lee |

| 25 July 2025 Round 1 | Denn | 1–15 – 2–13 | Ballymachugh | St Bartholomew's Park |
| 20:00 | | | | Referee: Pat Clarke |

| 26 July 2025 Round 1 | Drumgoon | 0–13 – 2–11 | Butlersbridge | Hugh O'Reilly Memorial Park |
| 19:00 | | | | Referee: Margaret Farrelly |

| 26 July 2025 Round 1 | Shercock | 0–15 – 0–17 | Lacken | Lavey GAA Grounds |
| 19:00 | | | | Referee: Derek Argue |

| 26 July 2025 Round 1 | Killinkere | 0–9 – 0–17 | Bailieborough Shamrocks | St Bridget's Park |
| 19:00 | | Report | | Referee: Martin Sexton |

=== Round 2 ===
| 7 August 2025 Round 2 | Cornafean | 0–9 – 1–17 | Killinkere | St Matthew's Park |
| 19:45 | | | | Referee: Daire Donohoe |

| 7 August 2025 Round 2 | Knockbride | 0–12 – 1–20 | Cuchulainns | O'Raghallaigh Park |
| 20:00 | | Report | | Referee: Gabriel Patterson |

| 8 August 2025 Round 2 | Shercock | 1–10 – 0–18 | Ballymachugh | Dolan Park |
| 19:45 | | | | Referee: Kieran Olwell |

| 8 August 2025 Round 2 | Lacken | 0–9 – 3–10 | Butlersbridge | St Felim's Park |
| 19:45 | | | | Referee: Pat Clarke |

| 9 August 2025 Round 2 | Denn | 3–19 – 3–13 | Drumlane | Ballinagh GAA Grounds |
| 19:00 | | | | Referee: Conor Lyons |

| 10 August 2025 Round 2 | Bailieborough Shamrocks | 1–13 – 0–15 | Drumgoon | Hugh O'Reilly Memorial Park |
| 14:00 | | Report | | Referee: John Emmo |

| 10 August 2025 Round 2 | Cootehill | 2–16 – 0–11 | Lavey | St Bridget's Park |
| 17:15 | | | | Referee: Paddy Clarke |

=== Round 3 ===
| 21 August 2025 Round 3 | Bailieborough Shamrocks | 4–15 – 0–17 | Lacken | Kingspan Breffni |
| 20:00 | | | | Referee: Martin Sexton |

| 22 August 2025 Round 3 | Ballymachugh | 1–10 – 1–14 | Cootehill | Kingspan Breffni |
| 20:00 | | | | Referee: Daire Donohoe |

| 23 August 2025 Round 3 | Shercock | 1–15 – 3–13 | Cornafean | Annalee Park |
| 17:00 | | | | Referee: Chris McCaffrey |

| 23 August 2025 Round 3 | Lavey | 0–17 – 1–13 | Denn | Kingspan Breffni |
| 19:00 | | | | Referee: Kieran Olwell |

| 24 August 2025 Round 3 | Killinkere | 4–9 – 1–16 | Drumlane | Kingspan Breffni |
| 16:30 | | Report | | Referee: Mark Ferncombe |

| 24 August 2025 Round 3 | Cuchulainns | 1–17 – 1–15 | Drumgoon | O'Raghallaigh Park |
| 16:30 | | | | Referee: Adrian O'Hanlon |

| 24 August 2025 Round 3 | Knockbride | 2–16 — 4–10 | Butlersbridge | Kingspan Breffni |
| 19:00 | | | | Referee: Darren McCarville |

=== Round 4 ===
| 30 August 2025 Round 4 | Bailieborough Shamrocks | 1–11 – 1–11 | Cootehill | O'Raghallaigh Park |
| 17:00 | | | | Referee: Gabriel Patterson |

| 30 August 2025 Round 4 | Knockbride | 1–14 – 0–15 | Lavey | St Felim's Park |
| 17:00 | | | | Referee: Daire Donohoe |

| 30 August 2025 Round 4 | Denn | 2–16 – 1–14 | Lacken | Dr Plunkett Memorial Park |
| 17:00 | | | | Referee: Noel Mooney |

| 30 August 2025 Round 4 | Cornafean | 1–19 – 0–15 | Drumgoon | Kingspan Breffni |
| 17:00 | | | | Referee: Margaret Farrelly |

| 30 August 2025 Round 4 | Drumlane | 0–12 – 0–14 | Ballymachugh | Packie Devlin Park |
| 17:00 | | | | Referee: Stephen Flynn |

| 30 August 2025 Round 4 | Killinkere | 2–14 – 1–11 | Butlersbridge | Max McGrath Memorial Park |
| 17:00 | | | | Referee: Martin Sexton |

| 30 August 2025 Round 4 | Cuchulainns | 5–16 – 1–20 | Shercock | Dolan Park |
| 17:00 | | | | Referee: Conor Lyons |

== Knock-out stage ==
Quarter-finals
Cuchulainns | 1–19
Denn | 0–15
Killinkere | 1–18
Ballymachugh | 2–7
Cootehill | 1–9
Cornafean | 0–15
Bailieborough Shamrocks | 0–12
Butlersbridge | 3–12

Semi-finals
Cuchulainns | 1–21
Killinkere | 0–11
Cornafean | 1–10; 0–12 (R)
Butlersbridge | 1–10; 0–20 (R)

Final
Cuchulainns | 0–24
Butlersbridge | 0–18

=== Quarter-finals ===
| 5 September 2025 Quarter-final | Cuchulainns | 1–19 – 0–15 | Denn | Kingspan Breffni |
| 20:15 | | Report | | Referee: John Power |

| 6 September 2025 Quarter-final | Killinkere | 1–18 – 2–7 | Ballymachugh | Kingspan Breffni |
| 17:00 | | Report | | Referee: Jim Giblin |

| 5 September 2025 Quarter-final | Cootehill | 1–9 – 0–15 | Cornafean | Kingspan Breffni |
| 19:00 | | | | Referee: Daire Donohoe |

| 7 September 2025 Quarter-final | Bailieborough Shamrocks | 0–12 – 3–12 | Butlersbridge | Kingspan Breffni |
| 19:15 | | | | Referee: Margaret Farrelly |

=== Semi-finals ===
| 20 September 2025 Semi-final | Cornafean | 1–10 – 1–10 | Butlersbridge | Kingspan Breffni |
| 19:00 | | Report | | Referee: Paddy Clarke |

| 24 September 2025 Semi-final | Cuchulainns | 1–21 – 0–11 | Killinkere | Kingspan Breffni |
| 20:15 | | Report | | Referee: Margaret Farrelly |

| 26 September 2025 Semi-final replay | Butlersbridge | 0–20 – 0–12 | Cornafean | Kingspan Breffni |
| 20:00 | | | | Referee: James Clarke |

=== Final ===
| 5 October 2025 Final | Cuchulainns | 0–24 – 0–18 | Butlersbridge | Kingspan Breffni |
| 16:00 | Evan Doughty 0–5 (0–2f), Adam O'Reilly 0–4, Ryan Tobin 0–4, Niall Magee 0–3, Adrian Taite 0–2 (one 2pt), Mark Gilsenan 0–2, Niall Carolan 0–1, Philip Smyth 0–1, Bryan Magee 0–1, Luke Doyle 0–1 | Report | Fionntán O'Reilly 0–9 (two 2ptf, two 2pt, 0–1f), Caoimhin O'Reilly 0–5 (one 2ptf, 0–1f), Joe Dugdale 0–3, Luke Allison 0–1 | Referee: John Power; Man of the Match: Evan Doughty (Cuchulainns) |

== Relegation play-offs ==
=== Relegation semi-finals ===
| 14 September 2025 Relegation semi-final | Lacken | 0–7 – 0–15 | Shercock | Crowe Memorial Park |
| 13:00 | | | | Referee: Michael Lee |

| 14 September 2025 Relegation semi-final | Drumlane | 2–14 – 1–13 | Drumgoon | O'Connell Park |
| 13:00 | | | | Referee: James Clarke |

=== Final ===
| 21 September 2025 Relegation final | Drumgoon | 1–10 – 0–12 | Lacken | Rory O'Moore Park |
| 12:00 | | | | Referee: Martin Sexton |
