= 2023 Cavan Intermediate Football Championship =

2023 McEvoy's SuperValu Virginia Cavan Intermediate Football Championship
Tournament details
- County: Cavan
- Province: Ulster
- Year: 2023
- Trophy: Tommy Gilroy Cup
- Sponsor: McEvoy's SuperValu, Virginia
- Date: 10 August – 15 October 2023
- Teams: 14

Winners
- Champions: Ballyhaise (3rd win)
- Manager: Damien Keaney
- Captain: Padraig Moore
- Qualify for: Ulster Club IFC

Runners-up
- Runners-up: Denn
- Manager: Stephen Baxter
- Captain: Bernard Gaffney

Promotion/Relegation
- Promoted team(s): Ballyhaise
- Relegated team(s): Belturbet

The 2023 Cavan Intermediate Football Championship is the 59th edition of Cavan GAA's premier Gaelic football tournament for intermediate graded clubs in County Cavan, Ireland. The tournament consists of 14 teams, with the winner representing Cavan in the Ulster Intermediate Club Football Championship. The championship began on 10 August 2023.

Ballyhaise won the championship with a six-point win over Denn in the final.

== Team changes ==
The following teams have changed division since the 2022 championship season.

=== To Championship ===
Promoted from 2022 Cavan Junior Football Championship

- Drumlane (Junior Champions)

Relegated from 2022 Cavan Senior Football Championship

- Butlersbridge (Relegation play-off losers)

=== From Championship ===
Promoted to 2023 Cavan Senior Football Championship

- Castlerahan (Intermediate Champions)

Relegated to 2023 Cavan Junior Football Championship

- Killeshandra (Relegation play-off losers)

== League stage ==
All 14 teams enter the competition at this stage. A random draw determines which teams face each other in each of the four rounds. No team can meet each other twice in the group stage. The top eight teams go into the quarter-finals, while the bottom four teams enter the relegation play-offs. The first round draw took place on 15 May 2023.

Pos	Team	Pld	W	D	L	PF	PA	PD	Pts	Qualification
1	Ballyhaise	4	3	1	0	59	47	+12	7	Advance to quarter-final
2	Denn	4	3	0	1	80	57	+23	6	Advance to quarter-final
3	Shercock	4	3	0	1	59	47	+12	6	Advance to quarter-final
4	Templeport	4	3	0	1	59	57	+2	6	Advance to quarter-final
5	Killinkere	4	2	1	1	52	46	+6	5	Advance to quarter-final
6	Ballymachugh	4	2	1	1	54	51	+3	5	Advance to quarter-final
7	Cootehill	4	2	0	2	67	58	+9	4	Advance to quarter-final
8	Drumlane	4	1	2	1	51	46	+5	4	Advance to quarter-final
9	Butlersbridge	4	2	0	2	64	61	+3	4	
10	Cuchulainns	4	2	0	2	52	54	−2	4	
11	Belturbet	4	1	0	3	41	56	−15	2	Advance to relegation play-offs
12	Cornafean	4	1	0	3	51	77	−26	2	Advance to relegation play-offs
13	Drumgoon	4	0	1	3	54	61	−7	1	Advance to relegation play-offs
14	Bailieborough Shamrocks	4	0	0	4	34	59	−25	0	Advance to relegation play-offs

Source: Cavan GAA

=== Round 1 ===
10 August 2023 Round 1	Killinkere	2–5 – 0–11	Drumlane	Kingspan Breffni
20:00		Report		Referee: Jim Giblin

11 August 2022 Round 1	Denn	3–12 – 0–13	Templeport	Kingspan Breffni
20:00		Report		Referee: Margaret Farrelly

12 August 2022 Round 1	Cuchulainns	0–10 – 1–5	Belturbet	Kingspan Breffni
19:00		Report		Referee: Pat Clarke

12 August 2022 Round 1	Cornafean	1–10 – 4–8	Cootehill	Annalee Park
19:00				Referee: Chris McCaffrey

13 August 2022 Round 1	Ballyhaise	1–9 – 0–8	Bailieborough Shamrocks	Hugh O'Reilly Memorial Park
14:00				Referee: Kieran McCarville

13 August 2022 Round 1	Ballymachugh	2–11 – 2–8	Drumgoon	Kingspan Breffni
17:00		Report		Referee: Ollie Donohoe

13 August 2022 Round 1	Shercock	0–13 – 0–12	Butlersbridge	Kingspan Breffni
19:00		Report		Referee: Padraig Sheridan

=== Round 2 ===
19 August 2023 Round 2	Cuchulainns	1–12 – 1–14	Ballyhaise	St Matthew's Park
17:00				Referee: Noel Mooney

19 August 2023 Round 2	Killinkere	0–8 – 1–7	Shercock	St Anne's Park
17:00				Referee: Kieran McCarville

19 August 2023 Round 2	Drumlane	0–12 – 1–9	Drumgoon	Kingspan Breffni
17:00				Referee: John Power

20 August 2023 Round 2	Belturbet	3–6 – 2–6	Ballymachugh	Ballinagh GAA Grounds
14:00				Referee: Joe McQuillan

20 August 2023 Round 2	Cornafean	1–8 – 3–18	Denn	Annalee Park
14:00				Referee: Oliver Óg O'Reilly

20 August 2023 Round 2	Templeport	2–9 – 0–7	Bailieborough Shamrocks	St Felim's Park
14:00				Referee: Padraig Sheridan

20 August 2023 Round 2	Cootehill	0–15 – 2–15	Butlersbridge	Kingspan Breffni
17:00				Referee: Pat Clarke

=== Round 3 ===
25 August 2023 Round 3	Cootehill	3–9 – 1–5	Belturbet	Edwin Carolan Community Park
20:15				Referee: Noel Mooney

26 August 2023 Round 3	Ballyhaise	1–12 – 0–9	Butlersbridge	Max McGrath Memorial Park
17:00				Referee: Brendan Sweeney

26 August 2023 Round 3	Cornafean	1–12 – 1–11	Shercock	Dolan Park
17:00				Referee: John Emmo

26 August 2023 Round 3	Templeport	1–10 – 0–12	Drumlane	First Ulster Park
17:00				Referee: Michael Lee

26 August 2023 Round 3	Denn	0–14 – 0–11	Drumgoon	Jim Smith Park
19:00				Referee: Conor Dourneen

27 August 2023 Round 3	Killinkere	1–14 – 0–11	Cuchulainns	O'Raghallaigh Park
15:00				Referee: Joe McQuillan

27 August 2023 Round 3	Ballymachugh	0–10 – 0–7	Bailieborough Shamrocks	P.J. Duke Park
15:00				Referee: Barry McMenamin

=== Round 4 ===
9 September 2023 Round 4	Templeport	2–12 – 0–17	Drumgoon	Athletic Grounds
17:30				Referee: Oliver Óg O'Reilly

9 September 2023 Round 4	Ballyhaise	1–12 – 1–12	Ballymachugh	Kingspan Breffni
17:30				Referee: Noel Mooney

9 September 2023 Round 4	Butlersbridge	1–19 – 1–15	Denn	Joe Crowe Park
17:30				Referee: John Power

9 September 2023 Round 4	Cootehill	0–14 – 1–13	Killinkere	St Bridget's Park
17:30				Referee: Ollie Donohoe

9 September 2023 Round 4	Cuchulainns	1–13 – 1–9	Cornafean	Lavey GAA Grounds
17:30				Referee: Conor Dourneen

9 September 2023 Round 4	Shercock	2–16 – 1–9	Bailieborough Shamrocks	O'Raghallaigh Park
17:30				Referee: Barry McMenamin

9 September 2023 Round 4	Drumlane	2–10 – 0–10	Belturbet	First Ulster Park
17:30				Referee: Margaret Farrelly

== Knock-out stage ==
Quarter-finals
Templeport	1–13
Killinkere	1–17
Ballyhaise	1–15
Drumlane	0–12
Shercock	0–15
Ballymachugh	1–9
Denn	0–13
Cootehill	0–7

Semi-finals
Killinkere	2–9
Ballyhaise	1–17
Shercock	0–9
Denn	2–12

Final
Ballyhaise	0–13
Denn	0–7

=== Quarter-finals ===
15 September 2023 Quarter-final	Ballyhaise	1–15 – 0–12	Drumlane	Kingspan Breffni
20:15		Report		Referee: Ollie Donohoe

16 September 2023 Quarter-final	Shercock	0–15 – 1–9	Ballymachugh	Kingspan Breffni
17:00		Report		Referee: John Power

16 September 2023 Quarter-final	Templeport	1–13 – 1–17	Killinkere	Kingspan Breffni
19:00		Report		Referee: Martin Sexton

17 September 2023 Quarter-final	Denn	0–13 – 0–7	Cootehill	Kingspan Breffni
19:00				Referee: Noel Mooney

=== Semi-finals ===
29 September 2023 Semi-final	Killinkere	2–9 – 1–17	Ballyhaise	Kingspan Breffni
20:15				Referee: Barry McMenamin

30 September 2023 Semi-final	Shercock	0–9 – 2–12	Denn	Kingspan Breffni
19:30				Referee: Paddy Clarke

=== Final ===
15 October 2023 Final	Ballyhaise	0–13 – 0–7	Denn	Kingspan Breffni
16:00	Michael Brady 0–4 (0–3f), Padraig Moore 0–3 (0–1m), Kevin Tierney 0–2, Martin Conaty 0–2, Brían O'Rourke 0–1 (0–1m), David Brady 0–1	Report	Thomas Edward Donohoe 0–4 (0–4f), Cavell Keogan 0–1 (0–1f), Ben Conaty 0–1, Cian McCann 0–1	Referee: Ollie Donohoe; Man of the Match: Eoin Clarke (Ballyhaise)

== Relegation play-offs ==
=== Relegation semi-finals ===
23 September 2023 Relegation semi-final	Cornafean	1–13 – 1–12	Drumgoon	Páirc Naomh Fionnán
15:00				Referee: Ollie Donohoe

23 September 2023 Relegation semi-final	Belturbet	0–9 – 1–7	Bailieborough Shamrocks	Rory O'Moore Park
15:30				Referee: Barry McMenamin

=== Relegation final ===
20 September 2023 Relegation final	Belturbet	1–8 – 2–8	Drumgoon	St Felim's Park
16:30				Referee: Conor Dourneen
