= 2022 Cavan Intermediate Football Championship =

2022 Cavan IFC
Tournament details
- County: Cavan
- Province: Ulster
- Year: 2022
- Trophy: Tommy Gilroy Cup
- Sponsor: McEvoy's SuperValu, Virginia
- Date: 5 August – 9 October 2022
- Teams: 14

Winners
- Champions: Castlerahan (3rd win)
- Manager: Brian Donohoe
- Captain: Enda Flanagan
- Qualify for: 2022 Ulster Club IFC

Runners-up
- Runners-up: Ballyhaise
- Manager: Damien Keaney
- Captain: David Brady

Promotion/Relegation
- Promoted team(s): Castlerahan
- Relegated team(s): Killeshandra

The 2022 Cavan Intermediate Football Championship was the 58th edition of Cavan GAA's premier Gaelic football tournament for intermediate graded clubs in County Cavan, Ireland. The tournament consists of 14 teams, with the winner representing Cavan in the Ulster Intermediate Club Football Championship.

The championship starts with a league stage and then progresses to a knock out stage.

Castlerahan returned to the senior grade at the first time of asking, beating Ballyhaise by a goal in the final.

== Team changes ==
The following teams have changed division since the 2021 championship season.

=== To Championship ===
Promoted from 2021 Cavan Junior Football Championship

- Denn - (Junior Champions)

Relegated from 2021 Cavan Senior Football Championship

- Shercock - (Relegation play-off Losers)
- Castlerahan - (Relegation play-off Losers)

=== From Championship ===
Promoted to 2022 Cavan Senior Football Championship

- Butlersbridge - (Intermediate Champions)

Relegated to 2022 Cavan Junior Football Championship

- Arva - (Relegation play-off Losers)
- Drumlane - (Relegation play-off Losers)

== League stage ==
Pos	Team	Pld	W	L	D	PD	Pts
1	Cuchulainns	4	3	0	1	+30	7
2	Castlerahan	4	3	0	1	+15	7
3	Ballyhaise	4	3	1	0	+28	6
4	Templeport	4	3	1	0	+14	6
5	Cootehill	4	3	1	0	-2	6
6	Denn	4	2	2	0	+18	4
7	Bailieborough Shamrocks	4	2	2	0	+17	4
8	Killinkere	4	2	2	0	+6	4
9	Shercock	4	2	2	0	+2	4
10	Cornafean	4	2	2	0	−15	4
11	Ballymachugh	4	1	3	0	−3	2
12	Drumgoon	4	1	3	0	−13	2
13	Belturbet	4	0	4	0	−30	0
14	Killeshandra	4	0	4	0	−61	0

=== Round 1 ===
5 August 2022 Round 1	Cornafean	2-18 – 1-16	Ballymachugh	Our Lady of Lourdes Park
19:45		Report		Referee: Barry McMenamin

6 August 2022 Round 1	Shercock	0-13 – 0-10	Drumgoon	St Bridget's Park
17:00				Referee: Martin Sexton

6 August 2022 Round 1	Killeshandra	0-7 –3-18	Denn	Ballinagh GAA Grounds
17:00				Referee: Kieran McCarville

6 August 2022 Round 1	Belturbet	0-10 – 2-8	Ballyhaise	Max McGrath Park
19:00				Referee: Pat Clarke

6 August 2022 Round 1	Killinkere	0-7 – 1-7	Bailieborough Shamrocks	Hugh O'Reilly Memorial Park
19:00				Referee: Oliver Óg O'Reilly

7 August 2022 Round 1	Templeport	1-18 – 0-13	Cootehill	Páirc Emmet
16:00				Referee: Brendan Sweeney

7 August 2022 Round 1	Castlerahan	0-8 – 0-8	Cuchulainns	Dolan Park
		Report		Referee: Margaret Farrelly

=== Round 2 ===
13 August 2022 Round 2	Ballymachugh	1-11 – 3-9	Shercock	Jim Smith Park
18:00				Referee: Paddy Clarke

13 August 2022 Round 2	Cuchulainns	0-11 – 1-7	Bailieborough Shamrocks	O'Raghallaigh Park
18:00				Referee: Kieran McCarville

14 August 2022 Round 2	Cootehill	1-16 – 1-14	Drumgoon	St Anne's Park
14:00				Referee: Conor Dourneen

14 August 2022 Round 2	Templeport	1-17 – 2-9	Killeshandra	O'Connell Park
16:00				Referee: Padraig Sheridan

14 August 2022 Round 2	Killinkere	1-16 – 1-8	Belturbet	St Felim's Park
16:00				Referee: Jim Giblin

14 August 2022 Round 2	Ballyhaise	5-15 – 0-9	Cornafean	Breffni Park
17:00				Referee: Oliver Óg O'Reilly

14 August 2022 Round 2	Denn	2-7 – 1-14	Castlerahan	Dr. Plunkett Memorial Park
19:00				Referee: James Clarke

=== Round 3 ===
19 August 2022 Round 3	Shercock	0-13 – 2-10	Denn	Breffni Park
20:00				Referee: John Emmo

19 August 2022 Round 3	Drumgoon	0-8 – 3-8	Ballymachugh	Our Lady of Lourdes Park
20:30				Referee: Jim Giblin

20 August 2022 Round 3	Templeport	0-13 – 0-7	Belturbet	First Ulster Park
17:00				Referee: Oliver Óg O'Reilly

20 August 2022 Round 3	Killeshandra	1-3 – 2-17	Cuchulainns	Breffni Park
17:30				Referee: Paudge Farrelly

20 August 2022 Round 3	Cootehill	1-12 – 0-14	Cornafean	Annalee Park
17:30				Referee: Pat Clarke

21 August 2022 Round 3	Ballyhaise	1-15 – 2-8	Bailieborough Shamrocks	Hugh O'Reilly Memorial Park
14:00				Referee: Martin Sexton

21 August 2022 Round 3	Killinkere	1-13 – 1-17	Castlerahan	Breffni Park
16:00		Report		Referee: Packie Smith

=== Round 4 ===
3 September 2022 Round 4	Killinkere	1-13 – 0-11	Templeport	Ballinagh GAA Grounds
18:00				Referee: Paddy Clarke

3 September 2022 Round 4	Bailieborough Shamrocks	2-16 – 0-3	Killeshandra	P. J. Duke Park
18:00				Referee: Paul Kerr

3 September 2022 Round 4	Ballyhaise	0-10 – 1-14	Castlerahan	Lavey GAA Grounds
18:00				Referee: Joe McQuillan

3 September 2022 Round 4	Cornafean	0-10 – 0-8	Shercock	Dolan Park
18:00				Referee: Kieran McCarville

3 September 2022 Round 4	Ballymachugh	1-4 – 1-7	Cootehill	Breffni Park
18:00				Referee: Michael Lee

3 September 2022 Round 4	Cuchulainns	2-13 – 0-7	Belturbet	Athletic Grounds
18:00				Referee: Jim Giblin

3 September 2022 Round 4	Drumgoon	3-7 – 1-12	Denn	Max McGrath Park
18:00				Referee: Harry Conaty

== Knock-Out Stage ==
Quarter-finals
Templeport	0-5
Cootehill	5-13
Ballyhaise	2-13
Denn	1-10
Cuchulainns	3-18
Killinkere	2-11
Castlerahan	0-17
Bailieborough	1-5

Semi-finals
Cootehill	1-10
Ballyhaise	3-10
Cuchulainns	1-6; 1-9 (R)
Castlerahan	0-9; 2-9 (R)

Final
Ballyhaise	0-8
Castlerahan	1-8

=== Quarter-finals ===
9 September 2022 Quarter-final	Castlerahan	0-17 – 1-5	Bailieborough Shamrocks	Breffni Park
20:00		Report		Referee: Jim Giblin

10 September 2022 Quarter-final	Cuchulainns	3-18 – 2-11	Killinkere	Breffni Park
19:30		Report		Referee: Padraig Sheridan

11 September 2022 Quarter-final	Templeport	0-5 – 5-13	Cootehill	Breffni Park
16:00		Report		Referee: Paddy Clarke

11 September 2022 Quarter-final	Ballyhaise	2-13 – 1-10	Denn	Breffni Park
19:00		Report		Referee: Ollie Donohoe

=== Semi-finals ===
25 September 2022 Semi-final	Cuchulainns	1-6 – 0-9	Castlerahan	Breffni Park
13:00				Referee: Barry McMenamin

25 September 2022 Semi-final	Cootehill	1-10 – 3-10	Ballyhaise	Breffni Park
19:00				Referee: Martin Sexton

30 September 2022 Semi-final replay	Cuchulainns	1-6 – 2-9	Castlerahan	Breffni Park
20:00		Report		Referee: Oliver Óg O'Reilly

=== Final ===
9 October 2021
16:00
Final

Ballyhaise	0-8 – 1-8	Castlerahan
Michael Brady 0-2 (0-2f), Eoin Clarke 0-2 (0-2 45), Kevin Tierney 0-2, Martin Conaty 0-1, Brían O'Rourke 0-1	Report	Oisin O'Connell 1-3, Cian McCabe 0-2 (0-2f), Oisín Kiernan 0-1, Cormac Daly 0-1, Shane O'Reilly 0-1

Breffni Park
Referee: Jim Giblin

== Relegation play-offs ==
11 September 2022 Relegation semi-final	Ballymachugh	1-12 – 0-10	Killeshandra	Sheelin Park
12:00				Referee: Bartley Gilsenan

11 September 2022 Relegation semi-final	Drumgoon	0-8 – 0-8	Belturbet	Boyle Park
12:00				Referee: Pat Clarke

17 September 2022 Relegation semi-final replay	Drumgoon	1-16 – 0-11	Belturbet	Annalee Park
17:00				Referee: Noel Mooney

11 September 2022 Relegation Final	Killeshandra	0-7 – 0-14	Belturbet	O'Connell Park
12:00				Referee: Oliver Óg O'Reilly
