= 2024 Cavan Intermediate Football Championship =

2024 Kyte Powertech Cavan Intermediate Football Championship
Tournament details
- County: Cavan
- Province: Ulster
- Year: 2024
- Trophy: Tommy Gilroy Cup
- Sponsor: Kyte Powertech
- Date: 9 August – 13 October 2024
- Teams: 14

Winners
- Champions: Arva (4th win)
- Manager: Finbar O'Reilly
- Captain: Ciarán Brady
- Qualify for: Ulster Club IFC

Runners-up
- Runners-up: Butlersbridge
- Manager: Keelan Melaniff
- Captain: Cathal Leddy

Promotion/Relegation
- Promoted team(s): Arva
- Relegated team(s): Templeport

The 2024 Cavan Intermediate Football Championship was the 60th edition of Cavan GAA's premier Gaelic football tournament for intermediate graded clubs in County Cavan, Ireland. The tournament consists of 14 teams, with the winner representing Cavan in the Ulster Intermediate Club Football Championship. The championship began on 9 August 2024.

Having won the Junior championship in 2023, Arva secured back-to-back championship titles with ten-point win over Butlersbridge in the final.

== Team changes ==
The following teams have changed division since the 2023 championship season.

=== To Championship ===
Promoted from 2023 Cavan Junior Football Championship

- Arva (Junior Champions)

Relegated from 2023 Cavan Senior Football Championship

- Lacken (Relegation play-off losers)

=== From Championship ===
Promoted to 2024 Cavan Senior Football Championship

- Ballyhaise (Intermediate Champions)

Relegated to 2024 Cavan Junior Football Championship

- Belturbet (Relegation play-off losers)

== League stage ==
All 14 teams enter the competition at this stage. A random draw determines which teams face each other in each of the four rounds. No team can meet each other twice in the group stage. The top eight teams go into the quarter-finals, while the bottom four teams enter the relegation play-offs. The first round draw took place on 13 May 2024.

Pos	Team	Pld	W	D	L	PF	PA	PD	Pts	Qualification
1	Arva	4	4	0	0	98	49	+49	8	Advance to quarter-final
2	Butlersbridge	4	4	0	0	78	56	+22	8	Advance to quarter-final
3	Denn	4	3	0	1	68	59	+9	6	Advance to quarter-final
4	Cuchulainns	4	3	0	1	60	55	+5	6	Advance to quarter-final
5	Cootehill	4	2	1	1	68	65	+3	5	Advance to quarter-final
6	Shercock	4	2	1	1	59	58	+1	5	Advance to quarter-final
7	Cornafean	4	2	0	2	65	65	0	4 (Note: Cornafean are ranked ahead of Bailieborough as they won the head-to-head game between the teams.)	Advance to quarter-final
8	Bailieborough Shamrocks	4	2	0	2	55	54	+1	4	Advance to quarter-final
9	Drumlane	4	1	1	2	54	64	−10	3	
10	Killinkere	4	1	0	3	58	68	−10	2	
11	Lacken	4	1	0	3	53	65	−12	2	Advance to relegation play-offs
12	Templeport	4	1	0	3	53	90	−37	2	Advance to relegation play-offs
13	Drumgoon	4	0	1	3	43	51	−8	1	Advance to relegation play-offs
14	Ballymachugh	4	0	0	4	54	67	−13	0	Advance to relegation play-offs

Source: Cavan GAA

=== Round 1 ===
9 August 2024 Round 1	Ballymachugh	1–7 – 1–11	Lacken	Dr. Plunkett Memorial Park
19:45				Referee: Noel Mooney

9 August 2024 Round 1	Killinkere	1–14 – 0–9	Templeport	Páirc Emmet
19:45				Referee: Martin Sexton

10 August 2024 Round 1	Drumgoon	0–6 – 0–7	Denn	Jim Smith Park
18:30				Referee: Pat Clarke

10 August 2024 Round 1	Cornafean	0–18 – 2–9	Shercock	Max McGrath Memorial Park
18:30				Referee: John Emmo

10 August 2024 Round 1	Cootehill	2–8 – 1–8	Bailieborough Shamrocks	O'Raghallaigh Park
18:30				Referee: Conor Dourneen

11 August 2024 Round 1	Cuchulainns	2–7 – 3–9	Butlersbridge	Lavey GAA Grounds
14:00				Referee: Padraig Sheridan

11 August 2024 Round 1	Drumlane	1–10 – 0–15	Arva	Kingspan Breffni
16:00				Referee: Ollie Donohoe

=== Round 2 ===
15 August 2024 Round 2	Butlersbridge	4–10 – 3–10	Ballymachugh	Athletic Grounds
19:30		Report		Referee: Mark Ferncombe

16 August 2024 Round 2	Cornafean	1–9 – 1–10	Cuchulainns	St Bridget's Park
19:30				Referee: Michael Lee

16 August 2024 Round 2	Lacken	1–8 – 2–9	Bailieborough Shamrocks	Lavey GAA Grounds
19:30				Referee: Kieran McCarville

17 August 2024 Round 2	Cootehill	1–17 – 4–9	Templeport	Max McGrath Memorial Park
18:30				Referee: Daire Donohoe

17 August 2024 Round 2	Arva	0–19 – 1–10	Drumgoon	Annalee Park
18:30				Referee: Conor Lyons

17 August 2024 Round 2	Killinkere	1–9 – 0–13	Drumlane	St Matthew's Park
18:30				Referee: Barry McMenamin

18 August 2024 Round 2	Denn	2–11 – 1–15	Shercock	Dolan Park
16:00				Referee: Paddy Clarke

=== Round 3 ===
23 August 2024 Round 3	Drumlane	1–6 – 2–12	Butlersbridge	St Aidan's Park
20:30				Referee: John Power

25 August 2024 Round 3	Drumgoon	0–9 – 1–6	Shercock	St Anne's Park
				Referee: Kieran Olwell

25 August 2024 Round 3	Ballymachugh	1–8 – 2–8	Cuchulainns	St Matthew's Park
18:30		Report		Referee: Jim Giblin

25 August 2024 Round 3	Arva	4–21 – 1–5	Templeport	Rory O'Moore Park
14:00				Referee: Kieran McCarville

25 August 2024 Round 3	Denn	2–14 – 0–14	Lacken	St Felim's Park
14:00				Referee: Barry McMenamin

25 August 2024 Round 3	Killinkere	1–11 – 0–15	Cootehill	Kingspan Breffni
17:00		Report		Referee: Ollie Donohoe

25 August 2024 Round 3	Bailieborough Shamrocks	1–10 – 1–11	Cornafean	Kingspan Breffni
18:45		Report		Referee: James Clarke

=== Round 4 ===
7 September 2024 Round 4	Shercock	1–14 – 0–14	Ballymachugh	St Bartholomew's Park
17:00				Referee: Barry McMenamin

7 September 2024 Round 4	Lacken	0–14 – 3–11	Cuchulainns	Dolan Park
17:00		Report		Referee: Daire Donohoe

7 September 2024 Round 4	Denn	3–15 – 2–15	Cornafean	Athletic Grounds
17:00				Referee: Noel Mooney

7 September 2024 Round 4	Templeport	2–9 – 2–14	Butlersbridge	Packie Devlin Park
17:00				Referee: Conor Lyons

7 September 2024 Round 4	Arva	3–22 – 0–15	Templeport	Kingspan Breffni
17:00				Referee: Oliver Óg O'Reilly

7 September 2024 Round 4	Drumlane	1–16 – 1–16	Cootehill	Max McGrath Memorial Park
17:00				Referee: Conor Dourneen

7 September 2024 Round 4	Drumgoon	3–6 – 1–13	Bailieborough Shamrocks	St Bridget's Park
17:00				Referee: Mark Ferncombe

== Knock-out stage ==
Quarter-finals
Butlersbridge	2–10
Cornafean	1–10
Denn	1–13
Shercock	1–10
Cuchulainns	2–10
Cootehill	0–9
Arva	1–13
Bailieborough Shamrocks	0–10

Semi-finals
Butlersbridge	0–11
Denn	1–7
Cuchulainns	1–10; 0–11 (R)
Arva	0–13; 0–13 (R)

Final
Butlersbridge	0–11
Arva	3–11

=== Quarter-finals ===
14 September 2024 Quarter-final	Denn	1–13 – 1–10	Shercock	Kingspan Breffni
17:00				Referee: Derek Argue

14 September 2024 Quarter-final	Arva	1–12 – 1–10	Bailieborough Shamrocks	Kingspan Breffni
18:45		Report		Referee: Conor Lyons

15 September 2024 Quarter-final	Cuchulainns	2–10 – 0–9	Cootehill	Kingspan Breffni
14:45		Report		Referee: Mark Ferncombe

15 September 2024 Quarter-final	Butlersbridge	2–10 – 1–10	Cornafean	Kingspan Breffni
18:45		Report		Referee: Padraig Sheridan

=== Semi-finals ===
27 September 2024 Semi-final	Cuchulainns	1–10 – 0–13	Arva	Kingspan Breffni
20:00				Referee: Barry McMenamin

29 September 2024 Semi-final	Butlersbridge	0–11 – 1–7	Denn	Kingspan Breffni
16:00				Referee: Noel Mooney

6 October 2024 Semi-final replay	Cuchulainns	0–11 – 0–13	Arva	Kingspan Breffni
17:00		Report		Referee: Oliver Óg Ó'Reilly

=== Final ===
13 October 2024 Final	Butlersbridge	0–11 – 3–11	Arva	Kingspan Breffni
16:00	Caoimhin O'Reilly 0–4 (0–3f), Fionntán O'Reilly 0–2 (0–2f), Feargal Flanagan 0–2, Killian Leddy 0–1, Patrick McPhillips 0–1, Shane O'Rourke 0–1	Report	Jonathan McCabe 1–2, Ciarán Brady 1–1, Barry Donnelly 1–0, Cian O'Hara 0–2 (0–1f, 0–1 '45), Conal Sheridan 0–2, James Morris 0–1, Tristan Noack Hofmann 0–1, Peter Morris 0–1, Kevin Bouchier 0–1	Referee: Brendan Sweeney; Man of the Match: Jonathan McCabe (Arva)

== Relegation play-offs ==
=== Relegation semi-finals ===
15 September 2024 Relegation semi-final	Lacken	1–9 – 0–12	Ballymachugh	Joe Crowe Park
13:00				Referee: Pat Clarke

15 September 2024 Relegation semi-final	Templeport	1–11 – 1–11	Drumgoon	St Aidan's Park
13:00				Referee: John Emmo

22 September 2024 Relegation semi-final replay	Lacken	1–17 – 2–9	Ballymachugh	St Felim's Park
13:00				Referee: Jim Giblin

22 September 2024 Relegation semi-final replay	Templeport	0–9 – 0–19	Drumgoon	Annalee Park
13:00				Referee: Daire Donohoe

=== Final ===
29 September 2024 Relegation final	Ballymachugh	2–14 – 1–15	Templeport	Páirc Naomh Fionnán
13:00				Referee: Margaret Farrelly
