= 2017 Cavan Intermediate Football Championship =

Gaelic football tournament

2017 Cavan IFC
Tournament details
- County: Cavan
- Province: Ulster
- Year: 2017
- Trophy: Tommy Gilroy Cup
- Sponsor: Hotel Kilmore
- Date: 28 July - 1 October 2017
- Teams: 14

Winners
- Champions: Shercock (2nd win)
- Manager: Francis McPhillips
- Captain: Brian Sankey
- Qualify for: 2017 Ulster Club IFC

Runners-up
- Runners-up: Ballyhaise
- Manager: Ciaran O'Malley
- Captain: Shane Briody

Promotion/Relegation
- Promoted team(s): Shercock
- Relegated team(s): Drumlane; Killinkere; Denn

Other
- Player of the Year: Niall Clerkin (Shercock)

The 2017 Cavan Intermediate Football Championship was the 53rd edition of Cavan GAA's premier Gaelic football tournament for intermediate graded clubs in County Cavan, Ireland. The tournament consists of 14 teams, with the winner representing Cavan in the Ulster Intermediate Club Football Championship.

The championship starts with a league stage and then progresses to a knock out stage. The draw for the group stages of the championship were made on 10 April 2017.

Shercock won the championship by beating Ballyhaise in the final.

== Team changes ==
The following teams have changed division since the 2016 championship season.

=== To Championship ===
Promoted from 2016 Cavan Junior Football Championship

- Cornafean (Junior Champions)

Relegated from 2016 Cavan Senior Football Championship

- Ballyhaise (Relegation play-off Losers)
- Denn (Relegation play-off Losers)
- Killeshandra (Relegation play-off Losers)

=== From Championship ===
Promoted to 2017 Cavan Senior Football Championship

- Arva (Intermediate Champions)

Relegated to 2017 Cavan Junior Football Championship

- Drumalee (Relegation play-off Losers)
- Drung (Relegation play-off Losers)
- Templeport (Relegation play-off Losers)

== League stage ==
Pos	Team	Pld	W	L	D	PD	Pts
1	Laragh United	4	4	0	0	+21	8
2	Drumgoon	4	4	0	0	+16	8
3	Ballyhaise	4	3	1	0	+30	6
4	Belturbet	4	3	1	0	+8	6
5	Bailieborough Shamrocks	4	2	1	1	+1	5
6	Swanlinbar	4	2	1	1	-1	5
7	Denn (P.O.)	4	2	2	0	+12	4
8	Cornafean (P.O.)	4	2	2	0	+7	4
9	Shercock (P.O.)	4	4	2	2	-1	4
10	Drumlane	4	1	2	1	−6	3
11	Killinkere	4	1	3	0	−9	2
12	Butlersbridge	4	0	3	1	−24	1
13	Redhills	4	0	4	0	−25	0
14	Killeshandra	4	0	4	0	−29	0

=== Round 1 ===
28 July 2017 Round 1	Drumlane	1-15 – 0-10	Redhills	Páirc Emmet
20:00		Report		Referee: Packie Smith

28 July 2017 Round 1	Killeshandra	1-9 – 5-11	Ballyhaise	Our Lady of Lourdes Park
20:00				Referee: Gerry Sheridan

29 July 2017 Round 1	Killinkere	2-11 – 1-15	Belturbet	Athletic Grounds
19:00				Referee: Padraig Sheridan

30 July 2017 Round 1	Swanlinbar	2-10 – 2-20	Drumgoon	Annalee Park
14:00				Referee: James Clarke

30 July 2017 Round 1	Denn	1-10 – 1-14	Bailieborough Shamrocks	Dolan Park
14:00				Referee: Stephen McKiernan

30 July 2017 Round 1	Shercock	0-12 – 2-5	Cornafean	Dolan Park
15:30				Referee: Gerry Sheridan

30 July 2017 Round 1	Butlersbridge	0-13 – 0-16	Laragh United	St Felim's Park
17:00				Referee: Joey Curley

=== Round 2 ===
4 August 2017 Round 2	Killinkere	1-10 – 0-10	Killeshandra	Our Lady of Lourdes Park
20:00				Referee: Kieran McCarville

6 August 2017 Round 2	Bailieborough Shamrocks	0-8 – 1-13	Laragh United	Breffni Park
13:30		Report		Referee: Oliver Óg O'Reilly

6 August 2017 Round 2	Cornafean	0-13 – 2-14	Swanlinbar	Terry Coyle Park
14:00				Referee: John Emmo

6 August 2017 Round 2	Drumlane	0-6 – 0-11	Belturbet	Annalee Park
14:00				Referee: Martin Sexton

6 August 2017 Round 2	Shercock	1-7 – 2-8	Drumgoon	O'Raghallaigh Park
14:00				Referee: Tony Gregory

6 August 2017 Round 2	Redhills	2-5 – 2-17	Denn	Athletic Grounds
17:00				Referee: Padraig Sheridan

6 August 2017 Round 2	Butlersbridge	0-9 – 2-20	Ballyhaise	St Felim's Park
17:00		Report		Referee: Ollie Donohoe

=== Round 3 ===
11 August 2017 Round 3	Laragh United	0-18 – 0-9	Drumlane	Our Lady of Lourdes Park
20:00				Referee: James Clarke

11 August 2017 Round 3	Redhills	1-15 – 3-11	Swanlinbar	St Aidan's Park
20:00				Referee: John Power

12 August 2017 Round 3	Drumgoon	1-10 – 0-11	Belturbet	Annalee Park
19:00				Referee: Packie Smith

12 August 2017 Round 3	Bailieborough Shamrocks	0-15 – 0-15	Butlersbridge	P. J. Duke Park
19:00				Referee: Martin Cleary

13 August 2017 Round 3	Cornafean	2-13 – 0-7	Killeshandra	Breffni Park
13:30				Referee: Gerry Sheridan

13 August 2017 Round 3	Denn	1-12 – 2-12	Shercock	Breffni Park
18:30		Report		Referee: Oliver Óg O'Reilly

13 August 2017 Round 3	Ballyhaise	1-16 – 1-10	Killinkere	Breffni Park
20:00		Report		Referee: Chris McCaffrey

=== Round 4 ===
27 August 2017 Round 4	Drumlane	0-13 – 0-13	Swanlinbar	Corlough GAA Grounds
18:30				Referee: Kieran McCarville

27 August 2017 Round 4	Laragh United	2-9 – 2-8	Shercock	Boyle Park
18:30				Referee: Chris McCaffrey

27 August 2017 Round 4	Denn	0-20 – 1-10	Ballyhaise	Athletic Grounds
18:30				Referee: Ollie Donohoe

27 August 2017 Round 4	Butlersbridge	0-10 – 1-11	Belturbet	St Aidan's Park
18:30		Report		Referee: Jim Giblin

27 August 2017 Round 4	Cornafean	1-17 – 2-11	Redhills	St Felim's Park
18:30				Referee: Martin Sexton

27 August 2017 Round 4	Killeshandra	conc – w/o	Drumgoon	Terry Coyle Park
18:30				Referee: Margaret Farrelly

27 August 2017 Round 4	Bailieborough Shamrocks	3-12 – 1-13	Killinkere	Dolan Park
18:30				Referee: Gerry Sheridan

== League play-offs ==
1 September 2017 Quarter-final play-off	Denn	0-7 – 0-13	Shercock	Breffni Park
20:00		Report		Referee: Noel Mooney

6 September 2017 Quarter-final/Relegation play-off	Denn	4-8 – 2-21	Cornafean	Our Lady of Lourdes Park
20:00		Report		Referee: Joe McQuillan

== Knock-Out Stage ==
Quarter-finals
Ballyhaise	5-12
Swanlinbar	1-9
Belturbet	2-9
Bailieborough	1-9
Laragh United	2-7
Shercock	2-8
Drumgoon	2-10
Cornafean	0-13

Semi-finals
Ballyhaise	1-6; 0-14 (R)
Belturbet	0-9; 0-13 (R)
Shercock	2-13
Drumgoon	1-13

Final
Ballyhaise	1-9
Shercock	2-11

=== Quarter-finals ===
8 September 2017 Quarter-final	Belturbet	2-9 – 1-9	Bailieborough Shamrocks	Breffni Park
20:00		Report		Referee: Padraig Sheridan

10 September 2017 Quarter-final	Laragh United	2-7 – 2-8	Shercock	Jim Smith Park
15:00				Referee: Joey Curley

10 September 2017 Quarter-final	Ballyhaise	5-12 – 1-9	Swanlinbar	First Ulster Park
15:00		Report		Referee: Tony Gregory

10 September 2017 Quarter-final	Drumgoon	2-10 – 0-13	Cornafean	Breffni Park
18:00		Report		Referee: Brendan Sweeney

=== Semi-finals ===
16 September 2017 Semi-final	Shercock	2-13 – 1-13	Drumgoon	Breffni Park
18:30		Report		Referee: Gerry Sheridan

16 September 2017 Semi-final	Ballyhaise	1-6 – 0-9	Belturbet	Breffni Park
20:00				Referee: Oliver Óg O'Reilly

22 September 2017 Semi-final replay	Belturbet	0-13 – 0-14	Ballyhaise	St Aidan's Park
20:15		Report		Referee: Joe McQuillan

=== Final ===
1 October 2017 Final	Ballyhaise	1-9 – 2-11	Shercock	Breffni Park
16:00	Kevin Tierney 0-7 (0-7f), Colm Reilly 1-0, Martin Conaty 0-2 (0-2f)	Report	Niall Clerkin 1-2, Lee Clarke 1-1, Killian Clarke 0-4 (0-2f, 0-1 pen), Damien McIntyre 0-2, Dean O'Reilly 0-1, John McEnroe 0-1	Referee: Chris McCaffrey; Man of the Match: Niall Clerkin (Shercock)

== Relegation play-offs ==
9 September 2017 Relegation play-off	Drumlane	0-6 – 2-12	Redhills	St Felim's Park
16:00				Referee: Ollie Donohoe

9 September 2017 Relegation play-off	Killinkere	0-6 – 2-8	Butlersbridge	Athletic Grounds
16:00				Referee: Oliver Óg O'Reilly

23 September 2017 Relegation play-off	Denn	1-9 – 1-10	Killeshandra	Joe Crowe Park
15:00				Referee: Martin Sexton
