= 2014 Cavan Senior Football Championship =

2014 Cavan SFC
Tournament details
- County: Cavan
- Province: Ulster
- Year: 2014
- Trophy: Oliver Plunkett Cup
- Sponsor: Hotel Kilmore
- Date: 26 July - 17 October 2014
- Teams: 17
- Defending champions: Ballinagh

Winners
- Champions: Cavan Gaels (13th win)
- Manager: Peter Canavan
- Captain: Eamonn Reilly; Martin Dunne
- Qualify for: 2014 Ulster Club SFC

Runners-up
- Runners-up: Kingscourt Stars
- Manager: Niall Lynch
- Captain: Alan Clarke

Promotion/Relegation
- Relegated team(s): Redhills

Other
- Player of the Year: Niall McDermott (Ballinagh)

The 2014 Cavan Senior Football Championship was the 106th edition of Cavan GAA's premier club Gaelic football tournament for senior graded teams in County Cavan, Ireland. The tournament consists of 17 teams, with the winner going on to represent Cavan in the Ulster Senior Club Football Championship.

Ballinagh entered the championship as defending champions, but exited the championship Kingscourt Stars to at the semi-final stage.

Cavan Gaels made up for the previous year's final defeat and beat Kingscourt Stars in the final by a point. This was their 13th Senior Championship and their first since 2011.

== Team changes ==
The following teams have changed division since the 2013 championship season.

=== To Championship ===
Promoted from 2013 Cavan Intermediate Football Championship

- Killeshandra - (Intermediate Champions)

=== From Championship ===
Relegated to 2014 Cavan Intermediate Football Championship

- Belturbet

== Opening rounds ==
=== Preliminary rounds ===
26 July 2014 Preliminary round A	Killygarry	2-10 – 0-6	Killeshandra	Breffni Park
20:00				Referee: Tony Gregory

27 July 2014 Preliminary round B	Kingscourt Stars	1-8 – 1-7	Castlerahan	Breffni Park
19:00				Referee: Michael Lee

3 August 2014 Preliminary round C	Castlerahan	3-23 – 0-12	Killeshandra	Breffni Park
19:00				Referee: Kieran McCarville

=== Round 1 ===
25 July 2014 Round 1	Cavan Gaels	0-13 – 0-9	Gowna	Breffni Park
20:00				Referee: Kieran McCarville

15 August 2014 Round 1	Cuchulainns	1-16 – 0-15	Ballinagh	Breffni Park
20:00		Report		Referee: Chris McCaffrey

16 August 2014 Round 1	Lacken	3-13 – 1-11	Killygarry	Our Lady of Lourdes Park
18:00				Referee: Ollie Donohoe

16 August 2014 Round 1	Castlerahan	1-7 – 1-6	Drumalee	Lavey GAA Grounds
18:00				Referee: Pat Clarke

16 August 2014 Round 1	Crosserlough	3-8 – 1-10	Drumgoon	Breffni Park
20:00		Report		Referee: James Clarke

17 August 2014 Round 1	Ramor United	1-11 – 1-9	Denn	Dr. Plunkett Memorial Park
15:00				Referee: Brendan Sweeney

17 August 2014 Round 1	Kingscourt Stars	2-11 – 1-4	Redhills	Hugh O'Reilly Memorial Park
16:00				Referee: Kieran McCarville

17 August 2014 Round 1	Lavey	0-10 – 0-9	Mullahoran	Breffni Park
19:00		Report		Referee: John Emmo

=== Round 2A ===
30 August 2014 Round 2A	Cavan Gaels	2-15 – 0-8	Cuchulainns	Ramor Park
18:00				Referee: Brendan Sweeney

30 August 2014 Round 2A	Lacken	4-6 – 0-11	Lavey	Breffni Park
20:00		Report		Referee: Martin Sexton

31 August 2014 Round 2A	Kingscourt Stars	0-12 – 0-7	Crosserlough	Lavey GAA Grounds
13:00				Referee: James Clarke

31 August 2014 Round 2A	Castlerahan	1-13 – 1-13	Ramor United	Breffni Park
19:30		Report		Referee: Conor Dourneen

3 September 2014 Round 2A Replay	Castlerahan	2-8 – 1-12	Ramor United	Breffni Park
20:15		Report		Referee: Conor Dourneen

== Back-door stage ==
=== Round 2B ===
29 August 2014 Round 2B	Killygarry	0-8 – 0-7	Drumalee	Breffni Park
20:00		Report		Referee: Michael G. Brady

30 August 2014 Round 2B	Gowna	2-13 – 1-9	Redhills	St. Felim's Park
17:00				Referee: Michael Lee

30 August 2014 Round 2B	Ballinagh	0-19 – 2-11	Denn	Breffni Park
18:30		Report		Referee: Noel Mooney

31 August 2014 Round 2B	Mullahoran	3-16 – 1-12	Drumgoon	Annalee Park
13:00				Referee: Raymond Kelly

=== Round 3 ===
6 September 2014 Round 3	Killygarry	2-9 – 1-11	Crosserlough	Ballinagh GAA Grounds
17:30

6 September 2014 Round 3	Ballinagh	0-15 – 1-12 (a.e.t.)	Lavey	Breffni Park
20:00		Report		Referee: Noel Mooney

7 September 2014 Round 3	Cuchulainns	0-12 – 0-6	Gowna	Lavey GAA Grounds
13:00				Referee: Packie Smith

7 September 2014 Round 3	Mullahoran	1-15 – 2-11 (a.e.t.)	Castlerahan	Breffni Park
19:30		Report		Referee: Tony Gregory

10 September 2014 Round 3 Replay	Ballinagh	3-13 – 2-8	Lavey	Breffni Park
20:15		Report		Referee: Kieran McCarville

== Knock-out stage ==
Quarter-finals
Cavan Gaels	0-11; 5-9 (R)
Lacken	0-11; 0-6 (R)
Cuchulainns	0-11
Killygarry	0-9
Kingscourt Stars	1-12
Ramor United	0-12
Ballinagh	3-10
Mullahoran	2-8

Semi-finals
Cavan Gaels	2-12
Cuchulainns	0-8
Kingscourt Stars	0-11
Ballinagh	0-10

Final
Cavan Gaels	0-16
Kingscourt Stars	0-15

=== Quarter-finals ===
12 September 2014 Quarter-final	Cavan Gaels	0-11 – 0-11	Lacken	Breffni Park
20:00		Report		Referee: Brendan Sweeney

13 September 2014 Quarter-final	Cuchulainns	0-11 – 0-9	Killygarry	Breffni Park
20:00				Referee: Padraig Kellegher

14 September 2014 Quarter-final	Kingscourt Stars	1-12 – 0-12	Ramor United	Breffni Park
14:30		Report		Referee: Ollie Donohoe

19 September 2014 Quarter-final Replay	Cavan Gaels	5-9 – 0-6	Lacken	Breffni Park
20:15		Report		Referee: Tony Gregory

28 September 2014 Quarter-final	Ballinagh	3-10 – 2-8	Mullahoran	Breffni Park
19:00				Referee: Pat Clarke

=== Semi-finals ===
27 September 2014 Semi-final	Cavan Gaels	2-12 – 0-8	Cuchulainns	Breffni Park
20:00				Referee: Joe McQuillan

5 October 2014 Semi-final	Kingscourt Stars	0-11 – 0-10	Ballinagh	Breffni Park
14:00		Report		Referee: Packie Smith

=== Final ===
12 October 2014
16:00
Final

Cavan Gaels	0-16 – 0-15	Kingscourt Stars
Seanie Johnston 0-6 (0-3f), Micheál Lyng 0-2, Declan Meehan 0-2, Stephen Murray 0-1, Eamonn Reilly 0-1, Robert Maloney-Derham 0-1, Conor McClarey 0-1, Barry Fortune 0-1, Vinny Coyle 0-1	Report	Barry Reilly 0-9 (0-7f, 0-2 '45), Christy McGowan 0-2, Anthony Corcoran 0-2, Barry Tully 0-1, Cian McArdle 0-1

Breffni Park
Attendance: 5,473
Referee: Oliver Óg O'Reilly

== Relegation play-offs ==
=== Preliminary relegation play-off ===
14 September 2014 Preliminary relegation play-off	Drumgoon	3-7 – 1-11	Redhills	Annalee Park
13:00				Referee: Oliver Óg O'Reilly

=== Semi-finals ===
19 September 2014 Relegation Semi-final	Killeshandra	2-13 – 1-10	Redhills	St. Aidan's Park
20:15				Referee: Ollie Donohoe

27 September 2014 Relegation Semi-final	Denn	2-9 – 1-9	Drumalee	Ballinagh GAA Grounds
15:30				Referee: Jim Giblin

=== Final ===
17 October 2014 Relegation Final	Drumalee	3-5 – 0-13	Redhills	Breffni Park 3G Pitch
20:15
