= 2025 Cavan Senior Football Championship =

Gaelic football tournament

2025 Kyte Powertech Cavan Senior Football Championship
Tournament details
- County: Cavan
- Province: Ulster
- Year: 2025
- Trophy: Oliver Plunkett Cup
- Sponsor: Kyte Powertech
- Date: 7 August – 12 October 2025
- Teams: 12
- Defending champions: Crosserlough

Winners
- Champions: Kingscourt Stars (12th win)
- Manager: Colin Kelly
- Captain: Barry Tully
- Qualify for: Ulster Club SFC

Runners-up
- Runners-up: Gowna
- Manager: Vinny Corey
- Captain: Conor Brady

Promotion/Relegation
- Relegated team(s): Ballinagh

The 2025 Cavan Senior Football Championship was the 116th edition of Cavan GAA's premier Gaelic football tournament for senior graded clubs in County Cavan, Ireland. The tournament consists of 12 teams, with the winners being awarded the Oliver Plunkett Cup and going on to represent Cavan in the Ulster Senior Club Football Championship. The championship began on 7 August 2025.

Crosserlough entered the championship as defending champions, but were dethroned at the semi-final stage by Gowna. Kingscourt Stars won their first title since 2015 and their twelfth in total with a nine-point win over Gowna in the final.

== Team changes ==
The following teams changed division since the 2024 championship season.

=== To Championship ===
Promoted from 2024 Cavan Intermediate Football Championship

- Arva (Intermediate Champions)

=== From Championship ===
Relegated to 2025 Cavan Intermediate Football Championship

- Lavey (Relegation play-off losers)

== League stage ==
All 12 teams enter the competition at this stage and are put into one league table. Each team plays four games with the fixtures decided by a random draw at the conclusion of each round. No team can meet each other twice in the league stage. The top eight teams in the league progress to the quarter-finals while the bottom four teams enter the relegation play-offs. The first round draw took place on 19 May 2025.

Pos	Team	Pld	W	D	L	PF	PA	PD	Pts	Qualification
1	Crosserlough	4	3	1	0	101	61	+40	7	Advance to quarter-finals
2	Gowna	4	3	1	0	99	69	+30	7	Advance to quarter-finals
3	Kingscourt Stars	4	3	1	0	89	69	+20	7	Advance to quarter-finals
4	Mullahoran	4	2	2	0	86	80	+6	6	Advance to quarter-finals
5	Ramor United	4	2	1	1	88	59	+29	5	Advance to quarter-finals
6	Ballyhaise	4	2	0	2	88	72	+16	4	Advance to quarter-finals
7	Cavan Gaels	4	2	0	2	79	66	+13	4	Advance to quarter-finals
8	Arva	4	2	0	2	76	82	−6	4	Advance to quarter-finals
9	Killygarry	4	1	0	3	72	84	−12	2	Advance to relegation play-offs
10	Ballinagh	4	1	0	3	70	106	−36	2	Advance to relegation play-offs
11	Castlerahan	4	0	0	4	58	95	−37	0	Advance to relegation play-offs
12	Laragh United	4	0	0	4	49	112	−63	0	Advance to relegation play-offs

Source: Cavan GAA

=== Round 1 ===
7 August 2025 Round 1	Crosserlough	5–17 – 0–17	Castlerahan	Kingspan Breffni
20:15		Report		Referee: Joe McQuillan

8 August 2025 Round 1	Cavan Gaels	0–19 – 0–20	Kingscourt Stars	Kingspan Breffni
20:000		Report		Referee: Padraig Sheridan

9 August 2025 Round 1	Killygarry	0–20 – 2–19	Arva	Kingspan Breffni
17:15		Report		Referee: Margaret Farrelly

9 August 2025 Round 1	Laragh United	0–10 – 6–19	Ballyhaise	Kingspan Breffni
19:00				Referee: Conor Dourneen

10 August 2025 Round 1	Gowna	2–22 – 2–9	Ballinagh	Kingspan Breffni
14:00		Report		Referee: Michael Lee

10 August 2025 Round 1	Mullahoran	2–10 – 2–10	Ramor United	Kingspan Breffni
19:00				Referee: James Clarke

=== Round 2 ===
15 August 2025 Round 2	Kingscourt Stars	3–13 – 1–10	Ballyhaise	Edwin Carolan Community Park
20:00				Referee: John Power

16 August 2025 Round 2	Ramor United	6–12 – 1–11	Arva	Kingspan Breffni
19:00				Referee: Noel Mooney

17 August 2025 Round 2	Killygarry	1–16 – 0–11	Laragh United	Jim Smith Park
14:30				Referee: Martin Sexton

17 August 2025 Round 2	Gowna	1–20 – 0–17	Cavan Gaels	Kingspan Breffni
14:30				Referee: Conor Dourneen

17 August 2025 Round 2	Crosserlough	3–17 – 0–9	Ballinagh	Crowe Memorial Park
17:00				Referee: Pat Clarke

17 August 2025 Round 2	Castlerahan	2–15 – 3–15	Mullahoran	Sheelin Park
17:00				Referee: Derek Argue

=== Round 3 ===
29 August 2025 Round 3	Ballinagh	1–15 – 2–22	Kingscourt Stars	Kingspan Breffni
20:00				Referee: John Power

30 August 2025 Round 3	Arva	1–14 – 1–15	Ballyhaise	Ballinagh GAA Grounds
18:00		Report		Referee: Padraig Sheridan

30 August 2025 Round 3	Gowna	1–20 – 2–17	Mullahoran	Kingspan Breffni
19:00				Referee: Joe McQuillan

31 August 2025 Round 3	Castlerahan	0–6 – 0–19	Cavan Gaels	Kingspan Breffni
14:00		Report		Referee: Derek Argue

31 August 2025 Round 3	Killygarry	2–10 – 2–18	Crosserlough	Kingspan Breffni
16:00		Report		Referee: John Emmo

31 August 2025 Round 3	Laragh United	0–4 – 3–19	Ramor United	Lavey GAA Grounds
18:00				Referee: Daire Donohoe

=== Round 4 ===
7 September 2025 Round 4	Arva	1–17 – 0–14	Castlerahan	Crowe Memorial Park
14:00				Referee: Pat Clarke

7 September 2025 Round 4	Killygarry	1–14 – 1–21	Cavan Gaels	St Matthew's Park
14:00				Referee: Joe McQuillan

7 September 2025 Round 4	Kingscourt Stars	1–16 – 1–16	Crosserlough	Hugh O'Reilly Memorial Park
14:00				Referee: James Clarke

7 September 2025 Round 4	Ballyhaise	3–11 – 2–17	Mullahoran	Páirc Naomh Fionnán
14:00		Report		Referee: Derek Argue

7 September 2025 Round 4	Ballinagh	2–22 – 4–12	Laragh United	O'Connell Park
14:00				Referee: Conor Lyons

7 September 2025 Round 4	Gowna	3–16 – 1–11	Ramor United	Lavey GAA Grounds
14:00				Referee: Conor Dourneen

== Knock-out stage ==
Quarter-finals
Crosserlough	2–17
Arva	0–19
Gowna	1–22
Cavan Gaels	0–11
Mullahoran	0–11
Ramor United	1–11
Kingscourt Stars	2–14
Ballyhaise	1–12

Semi-finals
Gowna	2–16
Crosserlough	2–11
Ramor United	0–17
Kingscourt Stars	2–12

Final
Gowna	0–13
Kingscourt Stars	2–16

=== Quarter-finals ===
12 September 2025 Quarter-final	Crosserlough	2–17 – 0–19	Arva	Kingspan Breffni
20:15		Report		Referee: Derek Argue

13 September 2025 Quarter-final	Gowna	1–22 – 0–11	Cavan Gaels	Kingspan Breffni
19:00				Referee: Conor Dourneen

16 September 2025 Quarter-final	Mullahoran	0–11 – 1–11	Ramor United	Kingspan Breffni
20:15		Report		Referee: Noel Mooney

17 September 2025 Quarter-final	Kingscourt Stars	2–14 – 1–12	Ballyhaise	Kingspan Breffni
20:15		Report		Referee: Conor Dourneen

=== Semi-finals ===
28 September 2025 Semi-final	Gowna	2–16 – 2–11	Crosserlough	Kingspan Breffni
15:00		Report		Referee: Joe McQuillan

28 September 2025 Semi-final	Ramor United	0–17 – 2–12	Kingscourt Stars	Kingspan Breffni
17:00		Report		Referee: John Power

=== Final ===
12 October 2025 Final	Gowna	0–13 – 2–16	Kingscourt Stars	Kingspan Breffni
16:00	Robbie Fitzpatrick 0–6 (0–4f), Cian Madden 0–4 (0–1f, one 2pt), Conor Madden 0–3 (one 2pt)	Report	Jordan Morris 0–9 (two 2ptf, 0–3f), Joe Dillon 1–1, Kevin Curtis 1–0, Cian Shekleton 0–2 (one 2pt), Padraig Faulkner 0–2, Odhran Cunningham 0–1, Michael Gargan 0–1 (0–1f)	Referee: Noel Mooney; Man of the Match: Joe Dillon (Kingscourt Stars)

== Relegation play-offs ==
=== Relegation semi-finals ===
21 September 2025 Relegation semi-final	Ballinagh	0–13 – 0–20	Castlerahan	Ballinagh GAA Grounds
13:00				Referee: Jim Giblin

21 September 2025 Relegation semi-final	Killygarry	1–22 – 2–15	Laragh United	Athletic Grounds
13:00				Referee: Kieran McCarville

=== Final ===
27 September 2025 Relegation final	Ballinagh	1–12 – 1–14	Laragh United	Lavey GAA Grounds
17:00				Referee: Pat Clarke
