= 2023 Cavan Senior Football Championship =

Gaelic sports event

2023 Kiernan's Service Station Cavan Senior Football Championship
Tournament details
- County: Cavan
- Province: Ulster
- Year: 2023
- Trophy: Oliver Plunkett Cup
- Sponsor: Kiernan's Service Station
- Date: 17 August – 22 October 2023
- Teams: 12
- Defending champions: Gowna

Winners
- Champions: Gowna (9th win)
- Manager: Fintan Reilly; Dermot McCabe
- Captain: Ryan McGahern
- Qualify for: Ulster Club SFC

Runners-up
- Runners-up: Kingscourt Stars
- Manager: Owen Lennon; Brendan Lennon
- Captain: Barry Reilly

Promotion/Relegation
- Relegated team(s): Lacken

The 2023 Cavan Senior Football Championship was the 114th edition of Cavan GAA's premier Gaelic football tournament for senior graded clubs in County Cavan, Ireland. The tournament consists of 12 teams, with the winner going on to represent Cavan in the Ulster Senior Club Football Championship. The championship began on 17 August 2023.

Gowna entered the championship as defending champions, and reached the final against Kingscourt Stars. Gowna won the final by seventeen points to successfully defend their title.

== Team changes ==
The following teams changed division since the 2022 championship season.

=== To Championship ===
Promoted from 2022 Cavan Intermediate Football Championship

- Castlerahan (Intermediate Champions)

=== From Championship ===
Relegated to 2023 Cavan Intermediate Football Championship

- Butlersbridge (Relegation play-off losers)

== League stage ==
All 12 teams enter the competition at this stage. A random draw determines which teams face each other in each of the four rounds. No team can meet each other twice in the group stage. The top eight teams go into the quarter-finals, while the bottom four teams enter the relegation play-offs. The first round draw took place on 15 May 2023.

Pos	Team	Pld	W	D	L	PF	PA	PD	Pts	Qualification
1	Kingscourt Stars	4	4	0	0	78	59	+19	8	Advance to quarter-final
2	Crosserlough	4	4	0	0	81	46	+35	8	Advance to quarter-final
3	Ramor United	4	3	0	1	61	49	+12	6	Advance to quarter-final
4	Killygarry	4	3	0	1	74	64	+10	6	Advance to quarter-final
5	Gowna	4	3	0	1	63	53	+10	6	Advance to quarter-final
6	Laragh United	4	2	0	2	71	61	+10	4	Advance to quarter-final
7	Cavan Gaels	4	2	0	2	65	65	0	4	Advance to quarter-final
8	Ballinagh	4	2	0	2	61	65	−4	4	Advance to quarter-final
9	Lacken Celtic	4	1	0	3	61	73	−12	2	Advance to relegation play-offs
10	Castlerahan	4	0	0	4	42	61	−19	0	Advance to relegation play-offs
11	Mullahoran	4	0	0	4	55	80	−25	0	Advance to relegation play-offs
12	Lavey	4	0	0	4	35	71	−36	0	Advance to relegation play-offs

Source: Cavan GAA

=== Round 1 ===
17 August 2023 Round 1	Gowna	1–18 – 3–8	Lacken	Kingspan Breffni
20:00		Report		Referee: Margaret Farrelly

18 August 2023 Round 1	Castlerahan	0–11 – 1–14	Ballinagh	Our Lady of Lourdes Park
20:00		Report		Referee: John Emmo

19 August 2023 Round 1	Cavan Gaels	2–10 – 1–14	Kingscourt Stars	Dolan Park
19:00		Report		Referee: Brendan Sweeney

19 August 2023 Round 1	Laragh United	4–14 – 0–10	Lavey	Kingspan Breffni
19:00		Report		Referee: James Clarke

20 August 2023 Round 1	Killygarry	2–10 – 1–11	Mullahoran	Joe Crowe Park
14:00		Report		Referee: Barry McMenamin

20 August 2023 Round 1	Ramor United	0–13 – 2–13	Crosserlough	Kingspan Breffni
19:00		Report		Referee: Conor Dourneen

=== Round 2 ===
24 August 2023 Round 2	Killygarry	1–15 – 0–14	Cavan Gaels	Kingspan Breffni
20:15		Report		Referee: Pat Clarke

25 August 2023 Round 2	Lacken	2–9 – 1–11	Castlerahan	Kingspan Breffni
20:15		Report		Referee: Margaret Farrelly

26 August 2023 Round 2	Crosserlough	4–15 – 0–10	Laragh United	Lavey GAA Grounds
17:00				Referee: Ollie Donohoe

26 August 2023 Round 2	Kingscourt Stars	3–13 – 1–11	Ballinagh	Kingspan Breffni
19:00		Report		Referee: Padraig Sheridan

27 August 2023 Round 2	Lavey	0–8 – 1–14	Gowna	Dr Plunkett Memorial Park
15:00				Referee: Oliver Óg O'Reilly

27 August 2023 Round 2	Mullahoran	1–11 – 2–14	Ramor United	Kingspan Breffni
19:00		Report		Referee: James Clarke

=== Round 3 ===
31 August 2023 Round 4	Laragh United	1–10 – 2–8	Cavan Gaels	Kingspan Breffni
20:15		Report		Referee: Barry McMenamin

1 September 2023 Round 4	Ramor United	0–12 – 0–7	Lavey	Edwin Carolan Community Park
20:15				Referee: Kieran McCarville

2 September 2023 Round 4	Ballinagh	1–11 – 3–14	Killygarry	Kingspan Breffni
19:00				Referee: Margaret Farrelly

3 September 2023 Round 4	Lacken	1–9 – 2–11	Kingscourt Stars	Dolan Park
14:00				Referee: Noel Mooney

3 September 2023 Round 4	Crosserlough	4–10 – 1–14	Mullahoran	Ballinagh GAA Grounds
15:00				Referee: Pat Clarke

3 September 2023 Round 4	Gowna	2–10 – 0–12	Castlerahan	Kingspan Breffni
19:00		Report		Referee: Michael Lee

=== Round 4 ===
10 September 2023 Round 4	Kingscourt Stars	3–13 – 2–11	Killygarry	Hugh O'Reilly Memorial Park
14:00				Referee: Pat Clarke

10 September 2023 Round 4	Cavan Gaels	1–18 – 2–11	Lacken	Páirc Naomh Fionnán
14:00				Referee: Joe McQuillan

10 September 2023 Round 4	Laragh United	2–16 – 1–7	Mullahoran	St Felim's Park
14:00				Referee: Kieran McCarville

10 September 2023 Round 4	Lavey	0–10 – 0–16	Ballinagh	Annalee Park
14:00				Referee: Padraig Sheridan

10 September 2023 Round 4	Ramor United	1–13 – 0–9	Gowna	St Matthew's Park
14:00		Report		Referee: James Clarke

15 September 2023 Round 4	Castlerahan	0–6 – 0–13	Crosserlough	O'Raghallaigh Park
20:00				Referee: Brendan Sweeney

== Knock-out stage ==
Quarter-finals
Kingscourt Stars	1–10
Cavan Gaels	0–9
Ramor United	1–12; 1–16 (R)
Laragh United	3–6; 1–12 (R)
Crosserlough	3–15
Ballinagh	0–5
Killygarry	0–17; 1–10 (R)
Gowna	2–11; 1–13 (R)

Semi-finals
Kingscourt Stars	1–12
Ramor United	1–8
Crosserlough	0–14
Gowna	1–18

Final
Kingscourt Stars	0–13
Gowna	5–15

=== Quarter-finals ===
22 September 2023 Quarter-final	Ramor United	1–12 – 3–6	Laragh United	Kingspan Breffni
20:00		Report		Referee: Conor Dourneen

23 September 2023 Quarter-final	Kingscourt Stars	1–10 – 0–9	Cavan Gaels	Kingspan Breffni
16:00		Report		Referee: Pat Clarke

23 September 2023 Quarter-final	Killygarry	0–17 – 2–11	Gowna	Kingspan Breffni
18:00		Report		Referee: Joe McQuillan

24 September 2023 Quarter-final	Crosserlough	3–15 – 0–5	Ballinagh	Kingspan Breffni
18:00		Report		Referee: John Emmo

1 October 2023 Quarter-final replay	Killygarry	1–10 – 1–13	Gowna	Joe Crowe Park
13:00				Referee: Michael Lee

1 October 2023 Quarter-final replay	Ramor United	1–16 – 1–12	Laragh United	Lavey GAA Grounds
16:30				Referee: James Clarke

=== Semi-finals ===
8 October 2023 Semi-final	Kingscourt Stars	1–12 – 1–8	Ramor United	Kingspan Breffni
15:00				Referee: Margaret Farrelly

8 October 2023 Semi-final	Crosserlough	0–14 – 1–18	Gowna	Kingspan Breffni
17:00				Referee: Noel Mooney

=== Final ===
22 October 2023 Final	Kingscourt Stars	0–13 – 5–15	Gowna	Kingspan Breffni
16:00	Jordan Morris 0–4 (0–3f), Joe Dillon 0–3 (0–1f), Barry Reilly 0–2 (0–1 s/l), Peter Corrigan 0–2, Padraig Faulkner 0–1, Ciaran Dermody 0–1	Report	Tiarnan Madden 2–4 (0–1f), Ryan Brady 1–0, Darragh McConnon 1–0, Oisin Pierson 1–0, Cian Madden 0–3 (0–2f), Eoghan Hartin 0–2, Conor Casey 0–2, Conor Madden 0–2, Ryan Donohoe 0–1, Daire Madden 0–1	Attendance: 5,148; Referee: Michael Lee; Man of the Match: Ryan Brady (Gowna)

== Relegation play-offs ==
=== Relegation semi-finals ===
23 September 2023 Relegation semi-final	Lacken	2–9 – 2–9	Lavey	Joe Crowe Park
15:30				Referee: Michael Lee

23 September 2023 Relegation semi-final	Castlerahan	0–16 – 0–15	Mullahoran	Castlerahan Community Pitch
15:30				Referee: Margaret Farrelly

29 September 2023 Relegation semi-final replay	Lacken	1–8 – 2–9	Lavey	Edwin Carolan Community Park
20:15				Referee: Kieran McCarville

=== Relegation final ===
8 October 2023 Relegation final	Mullahoran	0–18 – 0–12	Lacken	Our Lady of Lourdes Park
14:30				Referee: Michael Lee
