= 2024 Cavan Senior Football Championship =

Gaelic football tournament

2024 Kiernan's Service Station Cavan Senior Football Championship
Tournament details
- County: Cavan
- Province: Ulster
- Year: 2024
- Trophy: Oliver Plunkett Cup
- Sponsor: Kiernan's Service Station
- Date: 15 August – 20 October 2024
- Teams: 12
- Defending champions: Gowna

Winners
- Champions: Crosserlough (11th win)
- Manager: Ryan Daly
- Captain: Peter Smith
- Qualify for: Ulster Club SFC

Runners-up
- Runners-up: Ramor United
- Manager: Jude McNabb; Pat McNabb
- Captain: Jack Brady

Promotion/Relegation
- Relegated team(s): Lavey

The 2024 Cavan Senior Football Championship was the 115th edition of Cavan GAA's premier Gaelic football tournament for senior graded clubs in County Cavan, Ireland. The tournament consists of 12 teams, with the winner going on to represent Cavan in the Ulster Senior Club Football Championship. The championship began on 15 August 2024.

Gowna entered the championship as two-time defending champions, but were dethroned at the semi-final stage by Ramor United. Crosserlough won the championship with an eight-point win over Ramor in the final.

== Team changes ==
The following teams changed division since the 2023 championship season.

=== To Championship ===
Promoted from 2023 Cavan Intermediate Football Championship

- Ballyhaise (Intermediate Champions)

=== From Championship ===
Relegated to 2024 Cavan Intermediate Football Championship

- Lacken Celtic (Relegation play-off losers)

== League stage ==
All 12 teams enter the competition at this stage. A random draw determines which teams face each other in each of the four rounds. No team can meet each other twice in the group stage. The top eight teams go into the quarter-finals, while the bottom four teams enter the relegation play-offs. The first round draw took place on 13 May 2024.

Pos	Team	Pld	W	D	L	PF	PA	PD	Pts	Qualification
1	Crosserlough	4	4	0	0	91	34	+57	8	Advance to quarter-finals
2	Ballyhaise	4	3	0	1	69	65	+4	6	Advance to quarter-finals
3	Ramor United	4	2	1	1	59	55	+4	5	Advance to quarter-finals
4	Cavan Gaels	4	2	1	1	53	52	+1	5	Advance to quarter-finals
5	Mullahoran	4	2	1	1	47	50	−3	5	Advance to quarter-finals
6	Castlerahan	4	2	0	2	80	66	+14	4	Advance to quarter-finals
7	Gowna	4	1	2	1	66	66	0	4	Advance to quarter-finals
8	Ballinagh	4	2	0	2	53	62	−9	4	Advance to quarter-finals
9	Kingscourt Stars	4	1	1	2	61	67	−6	3	Advance to relegation play-offs
10	Killygarry	4	1	0	3	71	68	+3	2	Advance to relegation play-offs
11	Lavey	4	1	0	3	49	71	−22	2	Advance to relegation play-offs
12	Laragh United	4	0	0	4	38	81	−43	0	Advance to relegation play-offs

Source: Cavan GAA

=== Round 1 ===
15 August 2024 Round 1	Gowna	1–16 – 2–13	Kingscourt Stars	Kingspan Breffni
20:00				Referee: Noel Mooney

16 August 2024 Round 1	Killygarry	4–12 – 2–8	Castlerahan	Kingspan Breffni
20:00				Referee: Derek Argue

17 August 2024 Round 1	Ballinagh	0–14 – 1–9	Laragh United	Kingspan Breffni
17:00				Referee: Jim Giblin

17 August 2024 Round 1	Crosserlough	4–14 – 1–6	Lavey	Kingspan Breffni
19:00				Referee: Joe McQuillan

18 August 2024 Round 1	Mullahoran	0–14 – 0–11	Cavan Gaels	Kingspan Breffni
17:00				Referee: James Clarke

18 August 2024 Round 1	Ballyhaise	0–13 – 1–13	Ramor United	Kingspan Breffni
19:00				Referee: Brendan Sweeney

=== Round 2 ===
23 August 2024 Round 2	Laragh United	0–6 – 2–18	Crosserlough	Edwin Carolan Community Park
20:00				Referee: Pat Clarke

23 August 2024 Round 2	Kingscourt Stars	2–12 – 1–11	Killygarry	Kingspan Breffni
20:00				Referee: Margaret Farrelly

24 August 2024 Round 2	Ballinagh	0–10 – 1–10	Cavan Gaels	Páirc Naomh Fionnán
18:30				Referee: Padraig Sheridan

24 August 2024 Round 2	Mullahoran	0–9 – 1–6	Ramor United	Kingspan Breffni
18:45		Report		Referee: Joe McQuillan

25 August 2024 Round 2	Castlerahan	1–14 – 0–12	Lavey	Dolan Park
14:00				Referee: Brendan Sweeney

25 August 2024 Round 2	Gowna	0–17 – 3–9	Ballyhaise	Ballinagh GAA Grounds
16:00		Report		Referee: Michael Lee

=== Round 3 ===
29 August 2024 Round 3	Castlerahan	3–9 – 1–17	Ballyhaise	Kingspan Breffni
20:00				Referee: Pat Clarke

31 August 2024 Round 3	Killygarry	4–7 – 2–15	Ramor United	Lavey GAA Grounds
18:30		Report		Referee: Kieran Olwell

31 August 2024 Round 3	Crosserlough	2–15 – 0–11	Ballinagh	Joe Crowe Park
18:30				Referee: John Power

31 August 2024 Round 3	Gowna	1–12 – 1–12	Cavan Gaels	Kingspan Breffni
18:45		Report		Referee: Conor Dourneen

1 September 2024 Round 3	Mullahoran	2–10 – 0–10	Kingscourt Stars	Dolan Park
15:00		Report		Referee: Barry McMenamin

1 September 2024 Round 3	Laragh United	1–7 – 1–9	Lavey	Kingspan Breffni
17:00				Referee: Kieran McCarville

=== Round 4 ===
8 September 2024 Round 4	Ballinagh	1–15 – 1–13	Lavey	St Felim's Park
14:30		Report		Referee: John Emmo

8 September 2024 Round 4	Cavan Gaels	1–11 – 1–10	Ramor United	St Matthew's Park
14:30				Referee: Jim Giblin

8 September 2024 Round 4	Crosserlough	2–14 – 0–8	Mullahoran	Joe Crowe Park
14:30				Referee: James Clarke

8 September 2024 Round 4	Castlerahan	5–16 – 0–10	Laragh United	Jim Smith Park
14:30				Referee: Derek Argue

8 September 2024 Round 4	Ballyhaise	2–12 – 1–11	Kingscourt Stars	Hugh O'Reilly Memorial Park
14:30				Referee: Brendan Sweeney

8 September 2024 Round 4	Gowna	0–15 – 2–8	Killygarry	Kingspan Breffni
14:30		Report		Referee: Margaret Farrelly

== Knock-out stage ==
Quarter-finals
Crosserlough	3–13
Ballinagh	0–6
Cavan Gaels	2–8
Mullahoran	0–12
Ramor United	2–13
Castlerahan	1–8
Ballyhaise	1–12
Gowna	3–10

Semi-finals
Crosserlough	0–10
Cavan Gaels	0–8
Ramor United	2–10
Gowna	1–11

Final
Crosserlough	2–6
Ramor United	0–4

=== Quarter-finals ===
20 September 2024 Quarter-final	Ballyhaise	1–12 – 3–10	Gowna	Kingspan Breffni
20:00		Report		Referee: Michael Lee

21 September 2024 Quarter-final	Cavan Gaels	2–8 – 0–12	Mullahoran	Kingspan Breffni
17:00				Referee: Barry McMenamin

22 September 2024 Quarter-final	Crosserlough	3–13 – 0–6	Ballinagh	Kingspan Breffni
15:00				Referee: Derek Argue

22 September 2024 Quarter-final	Ramor United	2–13 – 1–8	Castlerahan	Kingspan Breffni
16:45				Referee: Conor Dourneen

=== Semi-finals ===
5 October 2024 Semi-final	Crosserlough	0–10 – 0–8	Cavan Gaels	Kingspan Breffni
19:15		Report		Referee: Joe McQuillan

6 October 2024 Semi-final	Ramor United	2–10 – 1–11	Gowna	Kingspan Breffni
15:00		Report		Referee: Pat Clarke

=== Final ===
20 October 2024 Final	Crosserlough	2–6 – 0–4	Ramor United	Kingspan Breffni
16:00	Stephen Smith 1–1, Conor Rehill 1–0 (1–0m), Emmett Boylan 0–2 (0–1f), Brandon Boylan 0–1 (0–1f), Matthew Costello 0–1 (0–1f), James Smith 0–1	Report	Matthew Smith 0–2 (0–2f), James Bradley 0–1 (0–1f), Cathal Maguire 0–1	Referee: Barry McMenamin; Man of the Match: Conor Rehill (Crosserlough)

== Relegation play-offs ==
=== Relegation semi-finals ===
22 September 2024 Relegation semi-final	Kingscourt Stars	4–12 – 0–9	Laragh United	O'Raghallaigh Park
13:00				Referee: Kieran McCarville

22 September 2024 Relegation semi-final	Killygarry	3–11 – 0–5	Lavey	Athletic Grounds
13:00				Referee: John Power

=== Final ===
29 September 2024 Relegation final	Laragh United	1–10 – 1–10	Lavey	St Matthew's Park
13:00				Referee: Conor Dourneen

9 October 2024 Relegation final replay	Laragh United	1–11 – 0–9	Lavey	Kingspan Breffni
20:30				Referee: Noel Mooney
