= 2013 Cavan Intermediate Football Championship =

Gaelic football championship

2013 Cavan IFC
Tournament details
- County: Cavan
- Province: Ulster
- Year: 2013
- Trophy: Tommy Gilroy Cup
- Sponsor: Hotel Kilmore
- Date: 10 August - 20 October 2013
- Teams: 14

Winners
- Champions: Killeshandra (2nd win)
- Manager: Stephen King
- Captain: Colm Duffy
- Qualify for: 2013 Ulster Club IFC

Runners-up
- Runners-up: Shercock
- Manager: Barry O'Reilly
- Captain: Shane Clarke

Promotion/Relegation
- Promoted team(s): Killeshandra
- Relegated team(s): Ballymachugh

Other
- Player of the Year: Declan McKiernan (Killeshandra)

The 2013 Cavan Intermediate Football Championship was the 49th edition of Cavan GAA's premier Gaelic football tournament for intermediate graded clubs in County Cavan, Ireland. The tournament consists of 14 teams, with the winner representing Cavan in the Ulster Intermediate Club Football Championship.

Killeshandra won the championship after a 1-10 to 1-8 win over Shercock in the final.

== Team changes ==
The following teams have changed division since the 2013 championship season.

=== To Championship ===
Promoted from 2012 Cavan Junior Football Championship

- Laragh United - (Junior Champions)
- Mountnugent

=== From Championship ===
Promoted to 2013 Cavan Senior Football Championship

- Lacken - (Intermediate Champions)
- Crosserlough

Relegated to 2013 Cavan Junior Football Championship

- Knockbride
- Kill Shamrocks

== Opening rounds ==
=== Preliminary round ===
10 August 2013 Preliminary round A	Drumlane	2-13 – 1-10	Mountnugent	Breffni Park
18:00		Report		Referee: Kieran McCarville

10 August 2013 Preliminary round B	Killeshandra	2-7 – 2-5	Cavan Gaels B	Breffni Park
19:30		Report		Referee: Michael G Brady

=== Round 1 ===
10 August 2013 Round 1	Shercock	1-13 – 1-8	Drung	Hugh O'Reilly Memorial Park
19:00				Referee: Padraig Kellegher

16 August 2013 Round 1	Bailieborough Shamrocks	0-7 – 0-11	Cootehill	O'Raghallaigh Park
20:00				Referee: Oliver Óg O'Reilly

16 August 2013 Round 1	Drumlane	2-17 – 0-12	Ballymachugh	St Aidan's Park
20:00				Referee: Ollie Donohoe

17 August 2013 Round 1	Killeshandra	0-12 – 0-7	Butlersbridge	Ballinagh GAA Grounds
19:00				Referee: Oliver Óg O'Reilly

17 August 2013 Round 1	Killinkere	1-9 – 1-12	Ballyhaise	Hugh O'Reilly Memorial Park
20:00				Referee: Kieran McCarville

17 August 2013 Round 1	Swanlinbar	1-16 – 0-9	Laragh United	First Ulster Park
20:00				Referee: Tony Gregory

== Back-door stage ==
=== Round 2 ===
22 August 2013 Round 2	Bailieborough Shamrocks	0-16 – 1-10 (a.e.t.)	Butlersbridge	Breffni Park
20:00		Report		Referee: Conor Dourneen

24 August 2013 Round 2	Drung	2-12 – 1-6	Ballymachugh	Packie Devlin Memorial Park
18:30				Referee: Tony Gregory

24 August 2013 Round 2	Laragh United	1-14 – 1-9	Mountnugent	Breffni Park
18:30		Report		Referee: Brian Crowe

25 August 2013 Round 2	Killinkere	0-15 – 1-8	Cavan Gaels B	P. J. Duke Park
18:30				Referee: Jim Giblin

=== Round 3 ===
1 September 2013 Round 3	Laragh United	0-8 – 1-13	Bailieborough Shamrocks	Breffni Park
18:00		Report		Referee: Noel Mooney

1 September 2013 Round 3	Drung	2-8 – 0-11	Killinkere	Breffni Park
19:30		Report		Referee: Gerry Sheridan

== Knock-out stage ==
Quarter-finals
Drung	1-6; 1-8 (R)
Killeshandra	0-9; 0-15 (R)
Swanlinbar	0-9
Ballyhaise	3-15
Cootehill	3-7
Bailieborough	0-11
Shercock	4-11
Drumlane	2-8

Semi-finals
Killeshandra	1-10
Ballyhaise	0-10
Cootehill	0-8
Shercock	2-6

Final
Killeshandra	1-10
Shercock	1-8

=== Quarter-finals ===
13 September 2013 Quarter-final	Cootehill	3-7 – 0-11	Bailieborough Shamrocks	Breffni Park
20:00				Referee: Jim Giblin

14 September 2013 Quarter-final	Shercock	4-11 – 2-8	Drumlane	Breffni Park
18:00				Referee: Michael Lee

14 September 2013 Quarter-final	Swanlinbar	0-9 – 3-15	Ballyhaise	Breffni Park
19:30				Referee: Packie Smith

15 September 2013 Quarter-final	Drung	1-6 – 0-9	Killeshandra	Annalee Park
13:00				Referee: Noel Mooney

21 September 2013 Quarter-final replay	Drung	1-8 – 0-15	Killeshandra	Breffni Park
20:00		Report		Referee: Oliver Óg O'Reilly

=== Semi-finals ===
21 September 2013 Semi-final	Cootehill	0-8 – 2-6	Shercock	Breffni Park
18:30		Report		Referee: Thomas Doonan

28 September 2013 Semi-final	Killeshandra	1-10 – 0-10	Ballyhaise	Breffni Park
18:30		Report		Referee: Martin Brady

=== Final ===
20 October 2013 Final	Killeshandra	1-10 – 1-8	Shercock	Breffni Park
16:00	Declan McKiernan 0-5 (0-5f), Shane Murphy 1-1, Damien Higgins 0-2, Sean McKiernan 0-1, Shane O'Reilly 0-1	Report	Brian Sankey 1-1, Niall Clerkin 0-2, Killian Clarke 0-1 (0-1 45), Michael McEneaney 0-1, Stephen Donnery 0-1, Aidan Lennon 0-1, John McEnroe 0-1	Referee: Michael Lee

== Relegation play-offs ==
=== Semi-final ===
5 October 2013 Relegation Semi-final	Butlersbridge	1-10 – 0-6	Ballymachugh	Joe Crowe Park
16:00				Referee: Raymond Kelly

=== Final ===
2 November 2013 Relegation Final	Mountnugent	0-9 – 1-3	Ballymachugh	Our Lady of Lourdes Park
