= 2022 Cavan Senior Football Championship =

2022 Kiernan's Service Station Cavan Senior Football Championship
Tournament details
- County: Cavan
- Province: Ulster
- Year: 2022
- Trophy: Oliver Plunkett Cup
- Sponsor: Kiernan's Service Station
- Date: 12 August – 16 October 2022
- Teams: 12
- Defending champions: Ramor United

Winners
- Champions: Gowna (8th win)
- Manager: Fintan Reilly; Dermot McCabe
- Captain: Ryan McGahern
- Qualify for: Ulster Club SFC

Runners-up
- Runners-up: Killygarry
- Manager: Jody Devine
- Captain: Mattie McKenna

Promotion/Relegation
- Relegated team(s): Butlersbridge

The 2022 Cavan Senior Football Championship was the 113th edition of Cavan GAA's premier Gaelic football tournament for senior graded clubs in County Cavan, Ireland. The tournament consists of 12 teams, with the winner going on to represent Cavan in the Ulster Senior Club Football Championship. The championship started on 12 August 2022.

Ramor United were the defending champions, but were dethroned by Killygarry in the semi-final, who reached their first senior final since 1971. Gowna beat Killygarry in the final to claim their 8th title and their first since 2002.

== Team changes ==
The following teams changed division since the 2021 championship season.

=== To Championship ===
Promoted from 2021 Cavan Intermediate Football Championship

- Butlersbridge (Intermediate Champions)

=== From Championship ===
Relegated to 2022 Cavan Intermediate Football Championship

- Shercock (Relegation play-off Losers)
- Castlerahan (Relegation play-off Losers)

== League stage ==
All 12 teams enter the competition at this stage. A random draw determines which teams face each other in each of the four rounds. No team can meet each other twice in the group stage. The top eight teams go into the quarter-finals, while the bottom four teams enter the relegation play-offs.

Pos	Team	Pld	W	D	L	PF	PA	PD	Pts	Qualification
1	Cavan Gaels	4	4	0	0	72	46	+26	8	Advance to quarter-final
2	Killygarry	4	3	1	0	61	44	+17	7	Advance to quarter-final
3	Crosserlough	4	3	0	1	77	47	+30	6	Advance to quarter-final
4	Mullahoran	4	3	0	1	46	55	−9	6	Advance to quarter-final
5	Ramor United	4	2	1	1	49	42	+7	5	Advance to quarter-final
6	Lacken Celtic	4	2	0	2	68	62	+6	4	Advance to quarter-final
7	Kingscourt Stars	4	1	1	2	58	73	−15	3	Advance to quarter-final
8	Gowna	4	1	1	2	62	64	−2	3	Advance to quarter-final
9	Lavey	4	0	2	2	53	55	−2	2	Advance to relegation play-offs
10	Ballinagh	4	1	0	3	60	70	−10	2	Advance to relegation play-offs
11	Laragh United	4	1	0	3	58	72	−14	2	Advance to relegation play-offs
12	Butlersbridge	4	0	0	4	45	79	−34	0	Advance to relegation play-offs

Source: Cavan GAA

=== Round 1 ===
12 August 2022 Round 1	Kingscourt Stars	1–9 – 2–11	Ramor United	Kingspan Breffni
20:00		Report		Referee: Barry McMenamin

13 August 2022 Round 1	Mullahoran	3–12 – 0–14	Ballinagh	Páirc Naomh Fionnán
18:00				Referee: Pat Clarke

13 August 2022 Round 1	Crosserlough	0–13 – 0–14	Cavan Gaels	Kingspan Breffni
19:30				Referee: Joe McQuillan

14 August 2022 Round 1	Butlersbridge	0–13 – 3–17	Laragh United	Athletic Grounds
14:00				Referee: Martin Sexton

14 August 2022 Round 1	Lavey	0–13 – 1–11	Lacken	St Matthew's Park
15:30				Referee: Brendan Sweeney

14 August 2022 Round 1	Gowna	1–12 – 2–11	Killygarry	Kingspan Breffni
19:00		Report		Referee: Margaret Farrelly

=== Round 2 ===
19 August 2022 Round 2	Kingscourt Stars	3–7 – 1–13	Lavey	Edwin Carolan Community Park
20:00		Report		Referee: Kieran McCarville

20 August 2022 Round 2	Killygarry	1–13 – 1–6	Ballinagh	St Matthew's Park
17:30				Referee: Michael Lee

20 August 2022 Round 2	Cavan Gaels	1–20 – 0–4	Mullahoran	Kingspan Breffni
19:30				Referee: James Clarke

21 August 2022 Round 2	Ramor United	0–10 – 0–6	Butlersbridge	Lavey GAA Grounds
14:00				Referee: Padraig Sheridan

21 August 2022 Round 2	Laragh United	0–15 – 2–10	Gowna	Ballinagh GAA Grounds
16:00				Referee: Conor Dourneen

21 August 2022 Round 2	Crosserlough	1–15 – 1–10	Lacken	Kingspan Breffni
19:00		Report		Referee: Margaret Farrelly

=== Round 3 ===
26 August 2022 Round 3	Laragh United	0–8 – 0–10	Mullahoran	Kingspan Breffni
20:00		Report		Referee: Michael Lee

27 August 2022 Round 3	Lacken	2–17 – 1–9	Kingscourt Stars	Dolan Park
17:00				Referee: Joe McQuillan

27 August 2022 Round 3	Gowna	0–14 – 1–11	Lavey	Kingspan Breffni
19:00		Report		Referee: James Clarke

28 August 2022 Round 3	Ballinagh	0–11 – 0–16	Cavan Gaels	Joe Crowe Park
14:00				Referee: Pat Clarke

28 August 2022 Round 3	Ramor United	0–11 – 0–13	Crosserlough	St Matthew's Park
16:00		Report		Referee: Barry McMenamin

28 August 2022 Round 3	Butlersbridge	0–9 – 1–14	Killygarry	Kingspan Breffni
20:00				Referee: Oliver Óg O'Reilly

=== Round 4 ===
4 September 2022 Round 4	Lavey	0–10 – 0–11	Mullahoran	St Felim's Park
15:00				Referee: Noel Mooney

4 September 2022 Round 4	Kingscourt Stars	2–12 – 1–14	Gowna	Jim Smith Park
15:00				Referee: Pat Clarke

4 September 2022 Round 4	Ballinagh	3–17 – 1–14	Butlersbridge	Annalee Park
15:00				Referee: Ollie Donohoe

4 September 2022 Round 4	Lacken	1–15 – 3–10	Cavan Gaels	Páirc Naomh Fionnán
15:00				Referee: Brendan Sweeney

4 September 2022 Round 4	Crosserlough	3–24 – 1–6	Laragh United	Edwin Carolan Community Park
15:00				Referee: Conor Dourneen

4 September 2022 Round 4	Ramor United	0–11 – 2–5	Killygarry	Kingspan Breffni
15:00				Referee: Margaret Farrelly

== Knock-out stage ==
Quarter-finals
Cavan Gaels	1–12; 0–9 (R)
Gowna	1–12; 2–14 (R)
Crosserlough	4–18
Lacken	0–8
Killygarry	2–16
Kingscourt Stars	2–15
Mullahoran	0–10; 0–6 (R)
Ramor United	0–10; 1–10 (R)

Semi-finals
Gowna	2–12
Crosserlough	2–11
Killygarry	2–7
Ramor United	1–9

Final
Gowna	2–13
Killygarry	1–9

=== Quarter-finals ===
16 September 2022 Quarter-final	Cavan Gaels	1–12 – 1–12	Gowna	Kingspan Breffni
20:00	Gearóid McKiernan 0–8 (0–5f, 0–1m), Kevin Meehan 1–0, Declan Meehan 0–1 (0–1f), Paul Graham 0–1, Luke Molloy 0–1, Evan McIntyre 0–1	Report	Robbie Fitzpatrick 1–3 (0–1f), Cian Madden 0–3 (0–3f), Ryan Brady 0–2, Conor Brady 0–2, Tiarnan Madden 0–1 (0–1f), Ryan Donohoe 0–1	Referee: Joe McQuillan

17 September 2022 Quarter-final	Crosserlough	4–18 – 0–8	Lacken	Kingspan Breffni
19:30	Paddy Lynch 1–6 (0–2f, 0–2 '45), Oran Rehill 1–1, Adrian Smith 1–0, James Smith 1–0, Peter Smith 0–2, Pierce Smith 0–2, Brandon Boylan 0–2, Darren Gaffney 0–2, Shane McManus 0–1, David Shalvey 0–1, John Cooke 0–1	Report	Killian Galligan 0–5 (0–3f), Shane Finnegan 0–1, Donal McSorley 0–1, Peter Galligan 0–1	Referee: Pat Clarke

18 September 2022 Quarter-final	Killygarry	2–16 – 2–15	Kingscourt Stars	Kingspan Breffni
16:00	Oisin Brady 0–6 (0–4f), Conor Smith 0–5 (0–3f, 0–1m), Martin Reilly 1–1, Darragh Lovett 0–3, Daniel Walsh 1–0, Ben Mooney 0–1	Report	Jordan Morris 0–8 (0–4f, 0–1m), Joe Dillon 1–3, Barry Reilly 1–2 (1–1f), Peter Corrigan 0–2	Referee: Conor Dourneen

18 September 2022 Quarter-final	Mullahoran	0–10 – 0–10	Ramor United	Kingspan Breffni
19:00	Enda O'Reilly 0–3 (0–2f), Cormac McKeogh 0–2, Cormac O'Reilly 0–2, Niall McGahern 0–1, Tom Harten 0–1, Darren Sheils 0–1	Report	Jack Brady 0–3 (0–3f), Paddy McNamee 0–3, Simon Cadden 0–2, Cathal Maguire 0–1, James Bradley 0–1	Referee: James Clarke

24 September 2022 Quarter-final replay	Cavan Gaels	0–9 – 2–14	Gowna	Kingspan Breffni
20:15	Gearóid McKiernan 0–7 (0–3f, 0–1m), Declan Meehan 0–1 (0–1f), Evaan Fortune 0–1	Report	Cian Madden 0–4 (0–4f), Tiarnan Madden 0–3 (0–1f), Conor Madden 1–0, Oisin Pierson 1–0, Conor Brady 0–2, Robbie Fitzpatrick 0–2, Eoghan Hartin 0–1, Ryan Donohoe 0–1, Mark McKeever 0–1	Referee: Margaret Farrelly

25 September 2022 Quarter-final replay	Mullahoran	0–6 – 1–10	Ramor United	Kingspan Breffni
12:30	Enda O'Reilly 0–4 (0–4f), Gavin Brady 0–1, Cormac O'Reilly 0–1	Report	Enda Maguire 1–1, Jack Brady 0–3 (0–2f), Eoin Somerville 0–2, Cathal Maguire 0–2, Paddy McNamee 0–2	Referee: Michael Lee

=== Semi-finals ===
1 October 2022 Semi-final	Gowna	2–12 – 2–11	Crosserlough	Kingspan Breffni
19:30	Conor Casey 1–2, Conor Madden 1–1, Tiarnan Madden 0–3 (0–2f), Ryan Brady 0–2, Robbie Fitzpatrick 0–2, Oisin Pierson 0–1 (0–1f), Cian Madden 0–1	Report	Paddy Lynch 0–5 (0–5f), Stephen Smith 1–1, Peter Smith 1–0 (1–0 pen), Dara McVeety 0–2, James Smith 0–1 (0–1m), Pierce Smith 0–1, Adrian Smith 0–1	Referee: Conor Dourneen

2 October 2022 Semi-final	Killygarry	2–7 – 1–9	Ramor United	Kingspan Breffni
16:00	Conor Smith 1–3 (0–2f), Darragh Lovett 0–4, Mattie McKenna 1–0	Report	Jack Brady 0–3 (0–2f), Ado Cole 1–0, Simon Cadden 0–2, Liam Brady 0–1 (0–1f), Mark Magee 0–1, Adam O'Connell 0–1, James Bradley 0–1	Referee: Pat Clarke

=== Final ===
16 October 2022 Final	Gowna	2–13 – 1–9	Killygarry	Kingspan Breffni
16:00	Ryan Donohoe 1–3 (0–1f, 0–1m), Cian Madden 0–5 (0–4f), Oisin Pierson 1–0, Conor Brady 0–2, Tiarnan Madden 0–1 (0–1f), Robbie Fitzpatrick 0–1, T. J. Fitzpatrick 0–1	Report	Oisin Brady 0–4 (0–4f), Martin Reilly 1–0, Conor Smith 0–2, Mattie McKenna 0–1, Daniel Walsh 0–1, Kevin Lovett 0–1	Attendance: 4,766; Referee: James Clarke; Man of the Match: Cian Madden (Gowna)

== Relegation play-offs ==
The 4 bottom placed teams the league phase will play off against each other. The 2 winners will maintain their senior status for 2023 while the 2 losers will advance to the relegation final. The loser will be relegated to the 2023 Intermediate Championship.

=== Relegation semi-finals ===
18 September 2022 Relegation semi-final	Ballinagh	0–13 – 2–18	Laragh United	Ballinagh GAA Grounds
14:00				Referee: Kieran McCarville

18 September 2022 Relegation semi-final	Lavey	0–13 – 0–9	Butlersbridge	Lavey GAA Grounds
14:00				Referee: Brendan Sweeney

=== Relegation final ===
23 September 2022 Relegation Final	Ballinagh	0–8 – 0–6	Butlersbridge	St Aidan's Park
20:15				Referee: Pat Clarke
