= Cavan Intermediate Football Championship =

Annual Gaelic football competition

- Current season or competition: 2025 Cavan Intermediate Football Championship
- Code: Gaelic football
- Founded: 1915
- Region: Cavan, Ireland (GAA)
- Trophy: Tommy Gilroy Cup
- No. of teams: 15
- Title holders: Butlersbridge (2nd title)
- Most titles: Five clubs (4 titles)
- Sponsors: O'Reilly Precast
- Official website: http://www.cavangaa.ie

The Cavan Senior Football Championship is an annual Gaelic football competition organised by Cavan GAA. It is played between the fourteen intermediate-graded clubs in County Cavan. It was first competed for in 1915, before a lapse prior to being revived in 1966. The winners are awarded the Tommy Gilroy Cup and go on to represent Cavan in the Ulster Intermediate Club Football Championship. The winners are also promoted to the Cavan Senior Football Championship for the following year.

Five different clubs—Arva, Ballinagh, Cuchulainns, Lacken, and Templeport—have won the competition four times. Butlersbridge are the current champions after beating Denn in the 2026 final.

== Format ==
14 teams contest the O'Reilly Precast Intermediate Football Championship. The championship is run on a league basis up to the quarter-final stage and knock-out thereafter. Each team plays 4 rounds in the league phase with the fixtures decided by a random draw at the conclusion of each round. No team can meet each other twice in the group stage. The top 8 teams in the league progress to the quarter-finals while the bottom 4 placed teams in the league enter a relegation play-off with 1 team to be relegated to the Cavan Junior Football Championship. The winner is promoted to the Cavan Senior Football Championship.

== List of finals ==
Key to list of winners
| † | Winning team reached the final of the Ulster Intermediate Club Football Championship |
| ‡ | Winning team won the Ulster Intermediate Club Football Championship |

List of Cavan Intermediate Football Championship finals
| Year | Winners | Score | Opponent | Ref. |
|---|---|---|---|---|
| 1915 | Cornafean | | | |
| 1916 | Cornafean | | | |
| 1923 | Templeport | 1–2 – 1–2 | Bruskey | |
| 1923 | Templeport | 3–1 – 2–4 (R) | Bruskey | |
| 1923 | Templeport | 1–2 – 1–2 (R) | Bruskey | |
| 1923 | Templeport | 1–2 – 1–0 (R) | Bruskey | |
| 1924 | Templeport | | | |
| 1925 | Gowna | 3–1 – 0–1 | Cootehill | |
| 1926 | Tullyco | 2–1 – 0–2 | Virginia Blues | |
| 1966 | Castlerahan | 1–14 – 0–7 | Arva | |
| 1967 | Lacken | 2–7 – 1–7 | Drumalee | |
| 1968 | Ballyhaise | 1–5 – 0–5 | Crosserlough | |
| 1969 | Drumalee | 1–9 – 1–6 | Arva | |
| 1970 | Killygarry | 2–5 – 2–3 | Cootehill | |
| 1971 | Cootehill | 2–08 – 1–03 | Virginia Blues | |
| 1972 | Arva | 1–10 – 1–04 | Ballymachugh | |
| 1973 | Redhills | 3–07 – 3–03 | Killeshandra | |
| 1974 | Maghera | 4–06 – 2–04 | Drumlane | |
| 1975 | Virginia | 0–12 – 0–09 | Templeport | |
| 1976 | Kingscourt Stars | 0–11 – 0–06 | Arva | |
| 1977 | Templeport | 2–06 – 0–05 | Mullahoran | |
| 1978 | Mullahoran | 2–09 – 1–06 | Castlerahan | |
| 1979 | Ballinagh | 1–09 – 0–04 | Killinkere | |
| 1980 | Munterconnaught | 2–04 – 0–07 | Cuchulainns | |
| 1981 | Ballymachugh | 0–06 – 0–06 | Redhills | |
| 1981 | Ballymachugh | 4–05 – 2–07 (R) | Redhills | |
| 1982 | Killinkere | 0–10 – 1–04 | Castlerahan | |
| 1983 | Arva | 1–11 – 0–07 | Knockbride | |
| 1984 | Shercock | 0–08 – 0–08 | Knockbride | |
| 1985 | Gowna | 0–14 – 0–04 | Cuchulainns | |
| 1986 | Killeshandra | 0–10 – 1–06 | Cuchulainns | |
| 1987 | Cuchulainns | 1–10 – 0–12 | Denn | |
| 1988 | Denn | 2–07 – 1–08 | Redhills | |
| 1989 | Bailieborough Shamrocks | 1–09 – 0–07 | Lavey | |
| 1990 | Denn | 2–15 – 1–07 | Belturbet | |
| 1991 | Killeshandra | 0–09 – 0–06 | Munterconnaught | |
| 1992 | Ballinagh | 0–10 – 0–07 | Ballymachugh | |
| 1993 | Cuchulainns | 3–11 – 1–04 | Lacken | |
| 1994 | Laragh United | 0–15 – 2–06 | Cornafean | |
| 1995 | Templeport | 1–14 – 0–07 | Arva | |
| 1996 | Belturbet | 1–05 – 0–05 | Denn | |
| 1997 | Lacken | 2–10 – 2–08 | Knockbride | |
| 1998 | Killygarry | 0–12 – 0–08 | Denn | |
| 1999 | Ballymachugh | 0–08 – 0–06 | Denn | |
| 2000 | Knockbride | 2–11 – 0–07 | Drung | |
| 2001 | Castlerahan | 1–06 – 0–09 | Drung | |
| 2001 | Castlerahan | 0–10 – 2–02 (R) | Drung | |
| 2002 | Drumgoon † | 0–08 – 0–06 | Denn | |
| 2003 | Denn | 1–08 – 0–09 | Ballinagh | |
| 2004 | Lacken | 1–09 – 1–08 | Drung | |
| 2005 | Cuchulainns | 1–06 – 0–07 | Drumalee | |
| 2006 | Drumalee | 0–07 – 0–07 | Ballinagh | |
| 2006 | Drumalee | 1–05 – 0–04 (R) | Ballinagh | |
| 2007 | Ballinagh ‡ | 1–07 – 0–09 | Lavey | |
| 2008 | Redhills | 0–14 – 1–08 | Ballyhaise | |
| 2009 | Lavey † | 3–09 – 1–08 | Cootehill | |
| 2010 | Drumalee | 1–11 – 0–08 | Drumlane | |
| 2011 | Drumgoon | 0–11 – 1–07 | Crosserlough | |
| 2012 | Lacken | 1–10 – 1–10 | Cootehill | |
| 2012 | Lacken | 3–10 – 1–09 (R) | Cootehill | |
| 2013 | Killeshandra | 1–10 – 1–08 | Shercock | |
| 2014 | Cootehill | 3–11 – 0–08 | Ballyhaise | |
| 2015 | Ballyhaise | 2–13 – 1–14 | Arva | |
| 2016 | Arva | 3–10 – 1–16 | Killinkere | |
| 2016 | Arva | 0–11 – 0–10 (R) | Killinkere | |
| 2017 | Shercock | 2–11 – 1–09 | Ballyhaise | |
| 2018 | Mullahoran † | 2–16 – 0–08 | Cuchulainns | |
| 2019 | Laragh United | 2–16 – 1–09 | Belturbet | |
| 2020 | Ballinagh | 0–23 – 0–11 | Butlersbridge | |
| 2021 | Butlersbridge | 1–12 – 0–14 | Ballyhaise | |
| 2022 | Castlerahan | 1–08 – 0–08 | Ballyhaise | |
| 2023 | Ballyhaise † | 0–13 – 0–7 | Denn | |
| 2024 | Arva † | 3–11 – 0–11 | Butlersbridge | |
| 2025 | Cuchulainns † | 0–24 – 0–18 | Butlersbridge | |
| 2026 | Butlersbridge | 2–17 – 2–13 | Denn | |

== Performances by club ==
Performances in the Cavan Intermediate Football Championship by club
| Club | Titles | Years won |
|---|---|---|
| Templeport | 4 | 1923, 1924, 1977, 1995 |
| Lacken | 4 | 1967, 1997, 2004, 2012 |
| Ballinagh | 4 | 1979, 1992, 2007, 2020 |
| Arva | 4 | 1972, 1983, 2016, 2024 |
| Cuchulainns | 4 | 1987, 1993, 2005, 2025 |
| Drumalee | 3 | 1969, 2006, 2010 |
| Denn | 3 | 1988, 1990, 2003 |
| Killeshandra | 3 | 1986, 1991, 2013 |
| Castlerahan | 3 | 1966, 2001, 2022 |
| Ballyhaise | 3 | 1968, 2015, 2023 |
| Cornafean | 2 | 1915, 1916 |
| Gowna | 2 | 1925, 1985 |
| Killygarry | 2 | 1970, 1998 |
| Ballymachugh | 2 | 1981, 1999 |
| Redhills | 2 | 1973, 2008 |
| Drumgoon | 2 | 2002, 2011 |
| Cootehill | 2 | 1971, 2014 |
| Shercock | 2 | 1984, 2017 |
| Mullahoran | 2 | 1978, 2018 |
| Laragh United | 2 | 1994, 2019 |
| Butlersbridge | 1 | 2021, 2026 |
| Tullyco | 1 | 1926 |
| Maghera | 1 | 1974 |
| Virginia | 1 | 1975 |
| Kingscourt Stars | 1 | 1976 |
| Munterconnaught | 1 | 1980 |
| Killinkere | 1 | 1982 |
| Bailieborough Shamrocks | 1 | 1989 |
| Belturbet | 1 | 1996 |
| Knockbride | 1 | 2000 |
| Lavey | 1 | 2009 |
