= Drumgoon GFC =

Cavan-based Gaelic games club

Drumgoon Éire Óg
- Droim Dhúin Éire Óg
- Founded: 1904
- County: Cavan
- Colours: Blue and Yellow
- Grounds: Boyle Park, Bough, Cootehill

Playing kits
Standard colours

Drumgoon are a Gaelic football club from County Cavan in Ireland. They are affiliated to Cavan GAA.

== History ==
Originated as Bough Shamrocks in 1904, Drumgoon evolved as the parish team, then as the rural parish team, taking the name of Drumgoon in the 1920s. They contested their first Cavan Senior Football Championship Final in 1927, and were defeated by Cavan Slashers.

They adopted the title of Drumgoon Éire Óg in 1984. In 2000 Drumgoon lost the Cavan Junior Football Championship to Cornafean but a year later in 2001 Drumgoon won their first Championship winning the Cavan Junior Football Championship, beating Kildallon 1–10 to 0–07. They went on to win the Ulster Junior Club Football Championship beating Doohmalet of Monaghan and then the All-Ireland Junior Club Football Championship beating Belmullet of Mayo 1–14 to 0–12.

In 2002 they beat Denn 0–08 to 0–06 to win the Cavan Intermediate Football Championship. They also went on to Ulster Intermediate Club Football Championship final, losing to Sean MacDiarmada of Monaghan on a scoreline of 0–14 to 0–07.

== Kit ==
Traditionally Drumgoon have always worn a blue jersey, shorts and socks with a yellow trim.

== Honours ==
- Cavan Intermediate Football Championship: 2
  - 2002, 2011
- All Ireland Junior Club Football Championship: 1
  - 2002
- Ulster Junior Club Football Championship: 1
  - 2002
- Cavan Junior Football Championship: 1
  - 2001
- Ladies Junior Championship
  - 2015

== See also ==
- Cavan Senior Football Championship
