= Redhills GFC =

Cavan-based Gaelic games club

- Cnoc Rua
- Founded: 1900
- County: Cavan
- Colours: Yellow and Blue
- Grounds: Max McGrath Park, Redhills GAA Grounds, Cavan

Playing kits
Standard colours

Senior Club Championships
	All Ireland	Ulster champions	Cavan champions
Football:	-	-	-
Hurling:	-	-	-
Ladies' football:	-	-	-

Redhills are a Gaelic football club from Redhills, County Cavan in Ireland. They are affiliated to Cavan GAA.

== History ==
Football was first organised in 1888 in Redhills under the name Annagh sons of Usna.

== Kit ==
Redhills jersey is mainly yellow with blue trim, blue shorts with yellow trim and blue socks with yellow trim.

== Honours ==
- Cavan Intermediate Football Championship: 2
  - 1973, 2008
- Cavan Junior Football Championship: 1
  - 2005

== See also ==
- Cavan Senior Football Championship
