= Bailieborough Shamrocks GAA =

Cavan-based Gaelic games club

Bailieboro Shamrocks
- Seamróga Choill an Chollaigh
- Founded: 1886
- County: Cavan
- Colours: Red and White
- Grounds: St. Anne's Park, Shercock; Road, Bailieborough
- Coordinates: 53.926037°N 6.969501°W

Playing kits
Standard colours

Senior Club Championships
	All Ireland	Ulster champions	Cavan champions
Football:	-	-	5
Hurling:	-	-	5

Bailieboro Shamrocks Gaelic Athletic Association (also spelled Bailieborough) is a Gaelic football, camogie and ladies' Gaelic football club based in Bailieborough, County Cavan in Ireland.

== History ==
The club was founded under the name Bailieborough Home Rulers (named after the Irish Home Rule movement) in 1886. In the first County Championship game in January 1887, Ballyconnell First Ulsters met the Bailieborough Home Rulers. The Home Rulers left Bailieborough at four in the morning and brought the goal posts on a horse and spring cart. The First Ulsters and Home Rulers erected goalposts in a field outside Cavan Town. A Royal Irish Constabulary force warned them they were breaking the Sunday Observance Act; they played on regardless.

By 1911 they were known as the Shamrocks, with the Home Rule movement being replaced by Irish republicanism and a desire for full independence.

Bailieboro Shamrocks have won five Cavan Senior Football Championships. They reached the final of the Ulster Senior Club Football Championship in 1995.

Camogie was played at Bailieboro Shamrocks between 1932 and 1950, and 1972 to present.

A ladies' Gaelic football team was founded in 2008.

The hurling history of the team goes back to 1923; they have won five county senior titles.

== Honours ==
=== Gaelic football ===
- Cavan Senior Football Championship (5): 1911, 1952, 1957, 1964, 1995
- Cavan Senior Football League (8): 1923, 1927, 1939, 1940, 1952, 1953, 1955, 1995
- Cavan Intermediate Football Championship (1): 1989
- Cavan Junior Football Championship (1): 1919
- Cavan Under-21 Football Championship (4): 1988, 1992, 1993, 1994
- Cavan Minor Football Championship (4): 1948, 1962, 1990, 2009 (the last as Killann Gaels, an amalgamation with Shercock)

=== Hurling ===
- Cavan Senior Hurling Championship (5): 1966, 1976, 1977, 1982, 1984

== Notable players ==
- Cillian Sheridan
