= Killeshandra GFC =

Cavan-based Gaelic games club

Killeshandra Leaguers GFC
- CLG Cill Na Sean Rátha
- Founded: 1932
- County: Cavan
- Colours: Yellow and White
- Grounds: Pairc Padraig Ui Daobhlaion, Killeshandra, Cavan

Playing kits
Standard colours

Senior Club Championships
	All Ireland	Ulster champions	Cavan champions
Football:	-	-	-
Hurling:	-	-	-
Ladies' football:	-	-	-

Killeshandra GFC is a Gaelic football club from Killeshandra, County Cavan in Ireland. They are affiliated to Cavan GAA.

== History ==
In 1889 there were three clubs in the parish, Arva Davitts, Killeshandra National Leaguers and Cornafean Tom Moronies. By the 1890s, the Gaelic Athletic Association (GAA) had more or less died out in the area. However, by 1900 it began to re-emerge. In 1901 there were two teams in the parish, Drumanery Emmets and Killeshandra De Wits. Throughout the next few years various teams in the parish would come and go.

During the 1910s and 1920s, the Killeshandra National Leaguers had difficulty in surviving as a club. Cornafean, founded in 1908, established itself as one of the leading clubs in the county and competed at Senior Level Football. It therefore attracted many of the best players in the surrounding areas of Killeshandra, Arva, Kilmore, Gowna and Lacken. The 1930s marked the beginning of a great era for Cavan football. The parish of Killeshandra was home to some of the best players on the Cavan team.

At an A.G.M held in the Market House in 1932, the Leaguers were re-formed and a new committee was elected. Subsequently, in 1935, they reached their first junior championship final. In the final they played Crubany and won by 11 points to 1. The team was also known as Croghan during that period. In 1939, they reached their second Junior Final against Crubany. Croghan went on to win. As a result of this victory Killeshandra went Senior, but this lasted for one year only. This was the last major championship win for 31 years. During the 1940s, a number of inter-county players served the club and from these Des Benson who won an All-Ireland with Cavan in 1948 playing in goal.

By the late 1950s, the club had lapsed but it was revived again at an A.G.M in 1960. By 1970 the team was back in winning form. After a gap of 31 years, they again won the Junior Championship beating Butlersbridge in the final. In 1971, the Leaguers were defeated in the Intermediate final by Redhills. In 1981, the Leaguers were promoted to Division 2 and also they won the Division 5 League title defeating Knockbride.

In 1982, the club again won the Division 5 League Title. Also in 1982, the "Inspiration of the Club", Sergeant Peter Maguire, died in Breffni Park while the club were playing Killygarry in that year's championship. In 1982, the Killeshandra Leaguers pitch, "Parc Phadraig Ui Dhoibhlinn", was also officially opened. 1983 saw The Leaguers winning the Junior Championship by defeating Kill in the final. In 1984, the club gained promotion to Division 1 and also defeated Drung in the Division 2 League Final.

1986 saw the club defeat Cuchullans in the Intermediate Championship Final. By 1991, they were again on their winning ways by defeating Munterconnaught in the Intermediate Championship Final. In 1992, they were beaten by a Ramor United side (who went on to win the Senior Championship) in the quarterfinal of that year's competition. By 1993, some of this set of players had begun to retire and the club were relegated to Division 2 that year. The decline continued and the club were relegated to Division 3 in 1996. In 1997, somewhat of a revival of fortunes began with the club winning the Division 3 League title and also by gaining promotion to Division 2 that year also. The club remained in Division 2 for years but were then relegated to Division 3 where they remained until a youthful new team emerged from what was a "promising young underage team" to win the Junior Championship and League in 2007. This young team went on to be the first Cavan junior Team to represent the County in an Official GAA Ulster Council Championship Quarter Final - where they comprehensively defeated the Antrim Champions Aughohill in Breffni Park, Cavan. Inexperience proved the undoing of the side when after a disappointing first half performance against "The Rock" from Tyrone this young side were narrowly defeated.

== Kit ==
Traditionally Killeshandra have worn a yellow jersey with white trim, white shorts with yellow trim and yellow socks with a white trim.

== Honours ==
- Cavan Intermediate Football Championship: 3
  - 1986, 1991, 2013
- Cavan Junior Football Championship: 3
  - 1970, 1983, 2007
- Cavan Minor Football Championship: 2
  - 1965, 1966

== See also ==
- Cavan Senior Football Championship
