= Drumlane GAA =

Cavan-based Gaelic games club

- Droim Leathain
- Founded: 1888
- County: Cavan
- Nickname: The Sons of O'Connell; Hardy Sons of Dan
- Colours: Green and White
- Grounds: O'Connell Park, Milltown, County Cavan

Playing kits
| Men's | Ladies' |

Senior Club Championships
| | All Ireland | Ulster champions | Cavan champions |
|---|---|---|---|
| Football: | 0 | 0 | 4 |
| Ladies' football: | 0 | 0 | 1 |

Drumlane Sons of O’Connell is a Gaelic football and Ladies' Gaelic football club based in Milltown, County Cavan, Ireland. The club takes its name from the parish of Drumlane. The club's crest features the Drumlane Abbey and Round tower.

== History ==
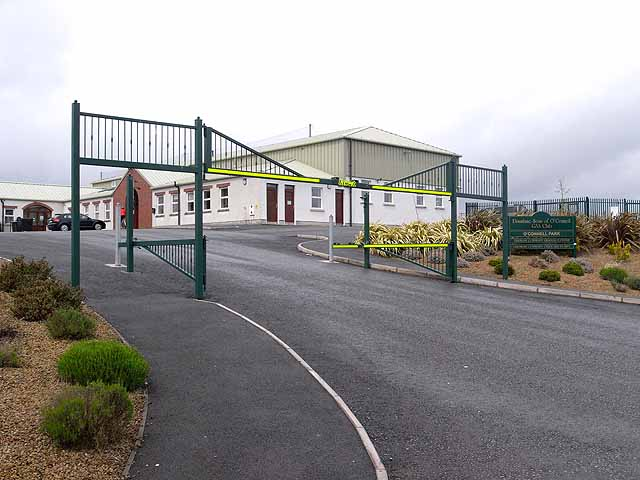
O'Connell Park, home to Drumlane GAA

Drumlane GAA was founded in 1888, and won the Cavan Senior Football Championship four times in the early 1900s.

The club won the Cavan Junior Football Championship for the first time in 1948, and won it again in 1971 and 1999. They have never won the Cavan Intermediate Football Championship, losing finals in 1974 and 2010. The club claimed the Junior championship for the fourth time in 2018, defeating Killinkere after a replay.

Drumlane won the Junior title for the fifth time in 2022, beating Arva by a point in the final. Wins over Craigbane, Clones, and Newtownbutler sent the club into the final of the Ulster Junior Club Football Championship for the first time in their history. Drumlane lost the final in a penalty shoot-out to Stewartstown Harps.

The club's also fields teams in ladies' football. They won the Junior Championship in 2011 and the Intermediate Championship in 2020. They went on to win the Senior Championship for the first time in 2023, beating Lacken in the final.

== Honours ==
Men's Football

- Cavan Senior Football Championship: 4
  - 1903, 1904, 1905, 1907
- Cavan Junior Football Championship: 5
  - 1948, 1971, 1999, 2018, 2022
- Cavan Minor Football Championship: 2
  - 1972, 1973

Ladies' Football

- Cavan Ladies Senior Football Championship: 1
  - 2023
- Cavan Ladies Intermediate Football Championship: 1
  - 2020
- Cavan Ladies Junior Football Championship: 1
  - 2011

== Notable players ==
- Frankie Kennedy
