= Ballyhaise GAA =

Cavan-based Gaelic games club

Ballyhaise
- Béal Átha hÉis
- County: Cavan
- Colours: Green and Gold
- Grounds: Annalee Park, Ballyhaise

Playing kits
Standard colours

Ballyhaise is a Gaelic football and Ladies' Gaelic football club based in the village of Ballyhaise, County Cavan, Ireland.

== History ==
The club's first championship success came in 1968, winning the Intermediate championship. Ballyhaise contested the Senior championship finals of 1976 and 1978, but came up short on both occasions. After losing the finals of 2008 and 2014, Ballyhaise claimed their second Intermediate title in 2015, beating Arva by two points in the final. After suffering relegation from Senior in 2016, Ballyhaise lost further Intermediate finals in 2017, 2021, and 2022.

Competing in their third final in a row, Ballyhaise won the Intermediate final in 2023, beating Denn by 0–13 to 0–7. With wins over Na Dúnaibh and Glenullin, Ballyhaise reached the final of the Ulster Intermediate Club Football Championship for the first time. Ballyhaise lost the final by a point to St Patrick's, Cullyhanna.

The club also fields teams in ladies' football, winning the Junior championship in 2003 and 2013 and won the Intermediate championship for the first time in 2023.

== Honours ==
Men's football

- Cavan Intermediate Football Championship: 3
  - 1968, 2015, 2023

Ladies' football

- Cavan Ladies Intermediate Football Championship: 1
  - 2023
- Cavan Ladies Junior Football Championship: 2
  - 2003, 2013
