= Drumalee GFC =

Cavan-based Gaelic games club

Drumalee
- Droim an Laoi
- Founded: 1935
- County: Cavan
- Nickname: The Lilywhites
- Colours: White (with Black trim)
- Grounds: St Felim's Park, Cavan

Playing kits
Standard colours

Drumalee are a Gaelic football club from County Cavan in Ireland. They are affiliated to Cavan GAA.

== History ==
On 19 January 1935, the Anglo-Celt recorded the birth of Drumalee club as follows, it grew out of an informal meeting at Drumalee Cross where it was decided to start a club. The club was affiliated at the 1935 county convention and Charlie O'Reilly, Drumherrish, was its delegate to the county board. That year it entered a club in the junior championship which was run on a home and away league basis. Lacken, Kilmore, Butlersbridge and Ashgrove were in their division.

The first outing of the club was against Lacken. They wore all-white jerseys and were afterwards frequently referred to in match reports as the 'Lily Whites'. They wore hand-knitted woollen jerseys and one old veteran who wore this white jersey with distinction recalled that on a hot day 'you would suffocate in it and after it was washed once or twice it wouldn't fit a child'. They got off to a good start beating Lacken by 1–4 to 1–1 in what the Anglo-Celt described as a 'bright clean game'.

The most successful year in the club's history was in 1969 when they won the Intermediate League and Championship and earned promotion to senior ranks for the first time. They defeated a fancied Arva team in the Championships by 1–9 to 1–6. A large crowd turned up in bad weather for the final on 5 December. They were rewarded with plenty of good football despite the bad conditions. Drumalee were a point behind at half-time after playing against the wind. They served up great football in the second half to win by 1–9 to 1–6.

Drumalee regained their senior status in 2006 winning the Cavan Intermediate Football Championship. They lost it soon afterwards, but regained it again in 2010 beating Drumlane 1–11 to 0–08.

== The Kit ==
Traditionally Drumalee have always worn a white strip. Black trim was introduced in the 80's when it became available on jerseys. Hence the nickname "The Lily Whites".

== Honours ==
- Cavan Intermediate Football Championship: 3
  - 1969, 2006, 2010

== See also ==
- Cavan Senior Football Championship
