= Laragh United GFC =

Cavan-based Gaelic games club

Laragh United
- Leathrach Aontaithe
- Founded: 1973
- County: Cavan
- Colours: Orange and White
- Grounds: P. J. Duke Park, Stradone, County Cavan

Playing kits
Standard colours

Senior Club Championships
	All Ireland	Ulster champions	Cavan champions
Football:	0	0	4

Laragh United are a Gaelic football club from Laragh and Stradone, County Cavan in Ireland. They are affiliated to Cavan GAA.

== History ==
In 1972 two local teams Laragh and Stradone amalgamated under the name St Brigid's for the Cavan Senior Football Championship. They reached the final, losing to the great seven-in-a-row Crosserlough. The success united the parish and in 1973 they came together under one name Laragh United. The club has the distinction (along with another Cavan club, Ramor United) of being one of the few GAA clubs with the suffix United.

It wasn't long before Laragh United delivered their first major success. In 1974 they won the Cavan Minor Football Championship and repeated the feat in 1976 and 1977. They won the Cavan Under-21 Football Championship in 1975 and 1976. This underage success was converted to senior success as they won their first Cavan Senior Football Championship in 1979 defeating Crosserlough. More Senior Football Championships followed and they won three-in-a-row between 1982 and 1984.

In recent years Laragh United have faded from the senior scene. 10 years after their last Senior Football Championship they were victorious at intermediate level winning the Intermediate Football Championship. Soon after Laragh fell into the Junior Football Championship but in 2012 they beat Mountnugent and were back in the Intermediate Football Championship.

In 2019 Laragh United once again joined the senior ranks when they defeated Belturbet in the Intermediate Football Championship final.

== Kit ==
Laragh United's jersey is orange with white trim, white shorts with orange trim and orange socks with white trim.

== Honours ==
- Cavan Senior Football Championship (4): 1979, 1982, 1983, 1984
- Cavan Intermediate Football Championship (2): 1994, 2019
- Cavan Junior Football Championship (2): 1944, 2012
- Cavan Under-21 Football Championship (2): 1975, 1976
- Cavan Minor Football Championship (2): 1974, 1976, 1977 (with Lavey)
