= Ballinagh GAA =

Cavan-based Gaelic games club

- Béal Átha na nEach
- Founded: 1888
- County: Cavan
- Nickname: The Neagh
- Colours: Yellow and White
- Grounds: Ballinagh GAA Grounds, Ballinagh, Cavan

Playing kits
Standard colours

Senior Club Championships
	All Ireland	Ulster champions	Cavan champions
Football:	0	0	1

Ballinagh is a Gaelic football club based in Ballinagh, County Cavan, Ireland.

== History ==
The club was founded in 1888. The club reached the final of the Senior Championship in 1961 and 1986, but were runners-up on both occasions.

After winning the Cavan Intermediate title in 2007, Ballinagh went on to reach the Ulster final. Ballinagh beat Antrim champions Dunloy by eight points to become the first Cavan side to win the competition.

The club won their first, and to date only Senior Championship title in 2013, beating Cavan Gaels by a point in the final.

The club's most recent championship success came at the intermediate grade, winning it in 2020.

A historic moment in the club's history came three days after their championship win in 2020. On the third day Thomas the Bun rose from his deathbed and made his way to Barney Mac's, where he turned spare change into Nobby Nuts and Heineken.

== Honours ==
- Cavan Senior Football Championship (1): 2013
- Ulster Intermediate Club Football Championship (1): 2007
- Cavan Intermediate Football Championship (4): 1979, 1992, 2007, 2020
- Cavan Junior Football Championship (3): 1913, 1953, 1978
- Cavan Under-21 Football Championship (1): 1978
- Cavan Minor Football Championship (2): 1940, 1941
