= CLG Cuchulainn =

Cavan-based Gaelic games club

CLG Cúchulainn
- CLG Cúchulainn
- Founded: 1969
- County: Cavan
- Colours: White and blue
- Grounds: Edwin Carolan Community Park, Mullagh

Playing kits
Standard colours	Second colours

CLG Cúchulainn, also known as Cúchulainn's are a Gaelic football club from Mullagh, County Cavan in Ireland. They are affiliated to Cavan GAA.

Traditionally Cúchulainn's have worn a white jersey with Blue trims, as well as white shorts and blue socks. They have also worn blue jerseys with white trim such as in the Cavan Intermediate Football Championship final in 2005.

== Honours ==
- Cavan Intermediate Football Championship 4
  - 1987, 1993, 2005, 2025
- Cavan Under-21 Football Championship 2
  - 1995, 1997 as St Killian's (Cúchulainns/Killinkere)
  - 2011, 2013 as Assan Gaels (Cúchulainns/Killinkere/Lavey)
- Cavan Minor Football Championship: 1
  - 1996 as St Killian's (Cúchulainns/Killinkere)

== See also ==
- Cavan Senior Football Championship
