= Cornafean GAA =

Cavan-based Gaelic games club

Cornafean St Fionnan
- Corr na Féinne Naomh Fionnan
- Founded: 1908
- County: Cavan
- Nickname: The Reds
- Colours: Red and White
- Grounds: Páirc Naomh Fionnán, Cornafean

Playing kits
Standard colours

Senior Club Championships
	All Ireland	Ulster champions	Cavan champions
Football:	0	0	20

Cornafean is a Gaelic Athletic Association club based in the rural parishes of Killeshandra and Kilmore, in County Cavan, Ireland. The club plays Gaelic Football and competes in Cavan GAA competitions. Cornafean is the most successful club in Cavan, having won 20 Cavan Senior Football Championships. The club produced some of the best players in the 'Golden Era' of the Cavan team. The club's last championship title at adult level was in 2016 when they won the 2016 Cavan Junior Championship title.

== Honours ==
- Cavan Senior Football Championship: 20
  - 1909, 1910, 1912, 1913, 1914, 1915, 1918, 1920, 1928, 1929, 1932, 1933, 1934, 1936, 1937, 1938, 1939, 1940, 1943, 1956.
- Cavan Intermediate Football Championship: 2
  - 1915, 1916
- Cavan Junior Football Championship: 4
  - 1914, 1927, 2000, 2016

== Notable players ==
- John Joe O'Reilly - Captain of two All-Ireland winning Cavan teams.
- Tom O'Reilly - Former Cavan midfielder
