= 2026 Cavan Senior Hurling Championship =

Annual hurling competition season

- Dates: July 10 - Aug 2, 2026
- Teams: 3
- Sponsor: Gilsenan Floors and Doors
- Champions: Cootehill Celtic (10th title)
- Runners-up: East Cavan Gaels

Tournament statistics
- Matches played: 3

The 2026 Cavan Senior Hurling Championship was the 67th staging of the Cavan Senior Hurling Championship since its establishment by the Cavan County Board in 1908.

Three teams contested the championship; Cootehill Celtic entered the competition as the defending champions, alongside East Cavan Gaels and Mullahoran St Joseph's.

The final was played on 2 August 2026 at Kingspan Breffni Park in Cavan between Cootehill Celtic and East Cavan Gaels in a repeat of the 2025 final. Cootehill Celtic won the contest 3-24 to 3-8 to retain their title and win their tenth overall.

== Teams ==
The 3 teams to contest the 2026 championship were:

Club	Location	Championship titles	Last championship title
Cootehill Celtic	Cootehill	9	2025
East Cavan Gaels	Bailieborough, Kingscourt, Shercock, Mullagh, Virginia	1	2024
Mullahoran	Mullahoran	27	2020

== Group stage ==
=== Group stage table ===
Finalists

Team	Matches				Score			Pts
Team	Pld	W	D	L	For	Against	Diff	Pts
Cootehill Celtic	1	1	0	0	33	11	22	2
East Cavan Gaels	1	1	0	0	27	14	13	2
Mullahoran St Joseph's	2	0	0	2	25	47	-22	0

=== Group stage results ===
Jul 10 Round 1	Mullahoran	2-8 - 4-15	East Cavan Gaels	3G Pitch
				Referee: John Emmo

Jul 17 Round 2	East Cavan Gaels	Postponed	Cootehill Celtic
				Referee: N/A

Jul 20 Round 3	Cootehill Celtic	2-27 - 1-8	Mullahoran	Hugh O Reilly Memorial Park
				Referee: Derek Argue

== Knockout stage ==
=== Bracket ===
Final
1	Cootehill Celtic	3-24
2	East Cavan Gaels	3-8

=== Final ===
Aug 2 Final	Cootehill Celtic	3-24 - 3-8	East Cavan Gaels	Kingspan Breffni Park
				Referee: John Emmo
