= 2016 Cavan Intermediate Football Championship =

2016 Cavan IFC
Tournament details
- County: Cavan
- Province: Ulster
- Year: 2016
- Trophy: Tommy Gilroy Cup
- Sponsor: Hotel Kilmore
- Date: 5 August - 15 October 2016
- Teams: 14

Winners
- Champions: Arva (3rd win)
- Manager: Peter Reilly
- Captain: Jonathan McCabe
- Qualify for: 2016 Ulster Club IFC

Runners-up
- Runners-up: Killinkere
- Manager: Damien Donohoe
- Captain: Kevin McCabe

Promotion/Relegation
- Promoted team(s): Arva
- Relegated team(s): Drumalee; Drung; Templeport

Other
- Player of the Year: Kevin Bouchier (Arva)

The 2016 Cavan Intermediate Football Championship was the 52nd edition of Cavan GAA's premier Gaelic football tournament for intermediate graded clubs in County Cavan, Ireland. The tournament consists of 14 teams, with the winner representing Cavan in the Ulster Intermediate Club Football Championship.

The championship starts with a league stage and then progresses to a knock out stage. The draw for the group stages was made on 12 April 2016.

Arva and Killinkere reached the final, and the game ended in a draw. Arva won the replay by a point to win their first Intermediate title for 33 years.

== Team changes ==
The following teams have changed division since the 2015 championship season.

=== To Championship ===
Promoted from 2015 Cavan Junior Football Championship

- Templeport (Junior Champions)

Relegated from 2015 Cavan Senior Football Championship

- Drumalee
- Drumgoon

=== From Championship ===
Promoted to 2016 Cavan Senior Football Championship

- Ballyhaise (Intermediate Champions)

== League Stage ==
All 14 teams enter the competition at this stage. A random draw determines which teams face each other in each of the four rounds. No team can meet each other twice in the group stage. The top 8 teams go into a seeded draw for the quarter-finals while the bottom 6 teams will enter a Relegation Playoff.

Pos	Team	Pld	W	L	D	PD	Pts
1	Shercock	4	4	0	0	+20	8
2	Laragh United	4	4	0	0	+25	8
3	Bailieborough Shamrocks	4	3	1	0	+19	6
4	Killinkere	4	3	1	0	+17	6
5	Butlersbridge	4	3	1	0	+6	6
6	Arva	4	2	1	1	+1	5
7	Swanlinbar	4	2	1	1	-4	5
8	Redhills	4	2	2	0	-7	4
9	Templeport	4	2	2	0	-14	4
10	Drumlane	4	1	3	0	0	2
11	Drung	4	1	3	0	+4	2
12	Belturbet	4	0	3	1	-20	1
13	Drumgoon	4	0	4	0	-14	0
14	Drumalee	4	0	4	0	-33	0

=== Round 1 ===
5 August 2016 Round 1	Laragh United	3-13 – 2-10	Drumgoon	O'Raghallaigh Park

6 August 2016 Round 1	Butlersbridge	0-14 – 0-13	Drumalee	Annalee Park

6 August 2016 Round 1	Templeport	1-16 – 2-7	Drung	O'Connell Park

6 August 2016 Round 1	Redhills	2-14 – 0-10	Belturbet	Breffni Park
		Report

7 August 2016 Round 1	Bailieborough Shamrocks	3-10 – 2-5	Drumlane	P. J. Duke Park

7 August 2016 Round 1	Shercock	0-14 – 0-11	Swanlinbar	Páirc Emmet

7 August 2016 Round 1	Killinkere	1-17 – 1-11	Arva	Breffni Park
		Report

=== Round 2 ===
12 August 2016 Round 2	Shercock	2-10 – 1-1	Drung	O'Raghallaigh Park

12 August 2016 Round 2	Killinkere	0-11 – 1-7	Drumlane	Breffni Park
		Report

13 August 2016 Round 2	Laragh United	6-13 – 1-9	Templeport	O'Connell Park

13 August 2016 Round 2	Belturbet	2-14 – 2-14	Arva	Ballinagh GAA Grounds
		Report

13 August 2016 Round 2	Butlersbridge	2-17 – 2-9	Drumgoon	Breffni Park
		Report

14 August 2016 Round 2	Swanlinbar	2-8 – 0-11	Redhills	First Ulster Park

14 August 2016 Round 2	Bailieborough Shamrocks	1-11 – 1-9	Drumalee	St Bridget's Park

=== Round 3 ===
20 August 2016 Round 3	Killinkere	1-16 – 0-11	Drumalee	St Matthew's Park

20 August 2016 Round 3	Redhills	1-9 – 1-7	Templeport	First Ulster Park

20 August 2016 Round 3	Drumlane	1-13 – 0-7	Drung	Páirc Emmet

20 August 2016 Round 3	Arva	2-9 – 2-8	Bailiebororugh Shamrocks	Breffni Park
		Report

21 August 2016 Round 3	Swanlinbar	1-10 – 0-13	Laragh United	Lavey GAA Grounds

21 August 2016 Round 3	Butlersbridge	1-12 – 0-13	Belturbet	Páirc Pádraig Uí Daobhlaion
		Report

21 August 2016 Round 3	Shercock	1-10 – 0-8	Drumgoon	St Bridget's Park

=== Round 4 ===
27 August 2016 Round 4	Arva	1-16 – 0-8	Drumalee	Ballinagh GAA Grounds

27 August 2016 Round 4	Drung	2-8 – 0-12	Butlersbridge	Terry Coyle Park

27 August 2016 Round 4	Bailieborough Shamrocks	4-17 – 1-10	Redhills	Hugh O'Reilly Memorial Park

27 August 2016 Round 4	Laragh United	1-16 – 0-11	Drumlane	Páirc Pádraig Uí Daobhlaion
		Report

27 August 2016 Round 4	Shercock	1-14 – 0-9	Belturbet	Annalee Park

28 August 2016 Round 4	Swanlinbar	2-13 – 1-14	Drumgoon	P. J. Duke Park

28 August 2016 Round 4	Templeport	0-9 – 0-8	Killinkere	St Felim's Park

== League play-offs ==
=== Quarter-final/Relegation play-off ===
3 September 2016 Quarter-final/Relegation play-off	Redhills	1-16 – 1-12	Templeport	First Ulster Park

== Knock-Out Stage ==
Quarter-finals
Arva	1-14
Bailieborough	0-8
Shercock	2-12
Redhills	1-8
Killinkere	3-11
Butlersbridge	0-8
Laragh United	0-20
Swanlinbar	1-10

Semi-finals
Arva	0-14
Shercock	1-10
Killinkere	1-13
Laragh United	2-9

Final
Arva	3-10; 0-11 (R)
Killinkere	1-16; 0-10 (R)

=== Quarter-finals ===
2 September 2016 Quarter-final	Arva	1-14 – 0-8	Bailieborough Shamrocks	Breffni Park
20:45	Kevin Bouchier 0-9 (0-3f), Jonathan McCabe 1-0, Conor McEntee 0-2 (0-2f), Thomas Brady 0-1, Peter Morris 0-1, Conal Sheridan 0-1	Report	Brendan Argue 0-5 (0-5f), James Fulton 0-1 (0-1f), Rhys Clarke 0-1, Darren Brady 0-1	Referee: Martin Sexton

3 September 2016 Quarter-final	Laragh United	0-20 – 1-10	Swanlinbar	Breffni Park
17:00	Paddy Rudden 0-8 (0-5f), Sean Tierney 0-4 (0-2f), Ian Leddy 0-3, Ruairi Power 0-2, Oisin Carolan 0-2, Eoghan Cooney 0-1	Report	Gearóid McKiernan 0-4 (0-2f), Conor Walsh 1-0, Breifne McKiernan 0-2, Christopher Curran (0-1f), Damien Leydon 0-1, Greg McGovern 0-1, Robbie Prior 0-1	Referee: Padraig Sheridan

3 September 2016 Quarter-final	Killinkere	3-11 – 0-8	Butlersbridge	Breffni Park
18:30	Ciaran Sexton 1-2, Emmett Fitzsimons 0-5 (0-3f), Darren Smith 1-1 (0-1f), Jason McMahon 1-0, Breen Smith 0-1, Garry Denning 0-1, Noel McGovern 0-1	Report	Caoimhin O'Reilly 0-3 (0-3f), Killian Leddy 0-2, Patrick Flynn 0-1, John Fitzpatrick 0-1, Paul Flynn 0-1	Referee: Stephen McKiernan

11 September 2016 Quarter-final	Shercock	2-12 – 1-8	Redhills	Breffni Park
14:00	Shane McPhillips 1-1, John McEnroe 1-0, Philip Clerkin 0-2, Killian Clarke 0-2, Ryan Clerkin 0-2, Niall Clerkin 0-2, Damien McIntyre 0-1, Lee Clarke 0-1, Paddy McPhillips 0-1	Report	Tom McCormack 1-1, Cormac Brides 0-3 (0-2f), Turloc Mooney 0-1 (0-1f), Rory Dunne 0-1, Derek Fay 0-1, Colin Reilly 0-1	Referee: Tony Gregory

=== Semi-finals ===
17 September 2016 Semi-final	Killinkere	1-13 – 2-9	Laragh United	Breffni Park
18:30	Emmett Fitzsimons 0-5 (0-4f), Damien Sexton 1-1, Jason McMahon 0-2, Peter McCabe 0-2, Breen Smith 0-1, Ciaran Sexton 0-1, Noel McGovern 0-1	Report	Jason Walsh 1-0, Eoghan Cooney 1-0, Paddy Rudden 0-2 (0-1f), Colm McKenna 0-2, Shane O'Rourke 0-2, Eoin Donoghue 0-1, Ruairi Power 0-1, Oisin Carolan 0-1	Referee: Kieran McCarville

17 September 2016 Semi-final	Arva	0-14 – 1-10	Shercock	Breffni Park
20:00	Kevin Bouchier 0-5 (0-1 '45), Conal Sheridan 0-4 (0-3f), Jonathan McCabe 0-2, Conor McEntee 0-1 (0-1f), Ciarán Brady 0-1, Peter Conneely 0-1	Report	Killian Clarke 1-2 (0-1f, 0-1 '45), Niall Clerkin 0-4 (0-2f), Philip Clerkin 0-1, Shane McPhillips 0-1, John McEnroe 0-1, Gary Smith 0-1	Referee: Noel Mooney

=== Final ===
2 October 2016 Final	Arva	3-10 – 1-16	Killinkere	Breffni Park
16:00	Conal Sheridan 0-6 (0-5f), Ciarán Brady 1-2, Kevin Bouchier 1-1, Jonathan McCabe 1-0, Thomas Brady 0-1	Report	Emmett Fitzsimons 0-8 (0-7f), Darren Smith 1-1, Lewis Fay-Cooper 0-2 (0-1 '45), Jason McMahon 0-2, Peter McCabe 0-2, Noel McGovern 0-1	Referee: John Emmo

15 October 2016 Final replay	Arva	0-11 – 0-10	Killinkere	Breffni Park
19:00	Conal Sheridan 0-5 (0-1f), Ciarán Brady 0-2, Kevin Bouchier 0-2, Peter Conneely 0-1, Jonathan McCabe 0-1	Report	Emmett Fitzsimons 0-5 (0-4f), Jason McMahon 0-2, Kevin McCabe 0-1, Liam McCabe 0-1, Peter McCabe 0-1	Attendance: 3,686; Referee: Kieran McCarville; Man of the Match: Conal Sheridan (Arva)

== Relegation play-offs ==
The teams placed 8–14 in the league phase will play off against each other. The 3 winners will maintain their intermediate status for 2017, while the three losers will be relegated to the 2017 J.F.C.

8 October 2016 Relegation play-off	Drumlane	0-14 – 0-8	Templeport	Corlough GAA Grounds

8 October 2016 Relegation play-off	Drumgoon	2-17 – 3-7	Drumalee	St Anne's Park

15 October 2016 Relegation play-off	Belturbet	0-9 – 0-6	Drung	P. J. Duke Park
