= 2015 Cavan Intermediate Football Championship =

2015 Cavan IFC
Tournament details
- County: Cavan
- Province: Ulster
- Year: 2015
- Trophy: Tommy Gilroy Cup
- Sponsor: Hotel Kilmore
- Date: 23 July - 4 October 2015
- Teams: 13

Winners
- Champions: Ballyhaise (2nd win)
- Manager: John Brady
- Captain: Eamonn Costello
- Qualify for: 2015 Ulster Club IFC

Runners-up
- Runners-up: Arva
- Manager: Brian Doyle
- Captain: Fergal McGlade

Promotion/Relegation
- Promoted team(s): Ballyhaise
- Relegated team(s): Cavan Gaels B (withdrew)

Other
- Player of the Year: Stephen Smith (Ballyhaise)

The 2015 Cavan Intermediate Football Championship was the 51st edition of Cavan GAA's premier Gaelic football tournament for intermediate graded clubs in County Cavan, Ireland. The tournament consists of 13 teams, with the winner representing Cavan in the Ulster Intermediate Club Football Championship.

Cavan Gaels B withdrew from the championship before it began. For 2016 Cavan Gaels' second string didn't compete in against first teams in the championship.

2014 runners-up Ballyhaise won the championship, beating newly-promoted Arva in the final.

== Team changes ==
The following teams have changed division since the 2014 championship season.

=== To Championship ===
Promoted from 2014 Cavan Junior Football Championship

- Arva - (Junior Champions)

Relegated from 2014 Cavan Senior Football Championship

- Redhills

=== From Championship ===
Promoted to 2015 Cavan Senior Football Championship

- Cootehill - (Intermediate Champions)

Relegated to 2015 Cavan Junior Football Championship

- Kill Shamrocks
- Mountnugent

== Opening rounds ==
=== Preliminary round ===
23 July 2015 Preliminary round	Drung	0-13 – 1-9	Laragh United	Breffni Park
20:00		Report		Referee: Noel Mooney

=== Round 1 ===
Round 1	Belturbet	w/o – conc	Cavan Gaels B

31 July 2015 Round 1	Arva	0-13 – 1-9	Shercock	Breffni Park
20:00		Report		Referee: Margaret Farrelly

2 August 2015 Round 1	Drung	0-15 – 3-2	Redhills	Breffni Park
18:00		Report		Referee: Oliver Óg O'Reilly

6 August 2015 Round 1	Bailieborough Shamrocks	1-8 – 0-9	Killinkere	Breffni Park
20:00		Report		Referee: Thomas Doonan

7 August 2015 Round 1	Butlersbridge	1-10 – 1-7	Drumlane	St Aidan's Park
20:00				Referee: Padraig Sheridan

9 August 2015 Round 1	Ballyhaise	1-17 – 1-9	Swanlinbar	Breffni Park
13:00		Report		Referee: Packie Smith

== Back-door stage ==
=== Round 2 ===
14 August 2015 Round 2	Drumlane	0-15 – 0-6	Redhills	Breffni Park
20:15		Report		Referee: Oliver Óg O'Reilly

16 August 2015 Round 2	Swanlinbar	1-14 – 2-10	Shercock	Annalee Park
16:30				Referee: Gerry Sheridan

=== Round 3 ===
22 August 2015 Round 3	Drumlane	0-13 – 0-10	Laragh United	Athletic Grounds
17:00				Referee: Chris McCaffrey

23 August 2015 Round 3	Swanlinbar	0-13 – 1-9	Killinkere	Annalee Park
13:00				Referee: Kieran McCarville

== Knock-out stage ==
Quarter-finals
Arva	0-18
Drung	3-6
Belturbet	1-8
Swanlinbar	0-10
Drumlane	2-10
Bailieborough	0-10
Ballyhaise	0-17
Butlersbridge	0-14

Semi-finals
Arva	2-10
Belturbet	1-10
Drumlane	1-7
Ballyhaise	1-11

Final
Arva	1-14
Ballyhaise	2-13

=== Quarter-finals ===
4 September 2015 Quarter-final	Arva	0-18 – 3-6	Drung	Breffni Park
20:15	Jonathan McCabe 0-5 (0-1f), Conal Sheridan 0-4 (0-3f), Kevin Bouchier 0-3, Ciarán Brady 0-2, Thomas Brady 0-1, Peter Morris 0-1, Ciaran Cooney 0-1, Shane Hamilton 0-1	Report	Paddy McEntee 1-1, Dan Fay 1-0, Andrew Rossiter 1-0, Declan McEntee 0-2 (0-1f) Michael McEntee 0-1 (0-1f), Barry Watters 0-1, Gary Watters 0-1	Referee: Raymond Tynan

5 September 2015 Quarter-final	Drumlane	2-10 – 0-10	Bailieborough Shamrocks	Breffni Park
19:00	Ryan Connolly 1-3 (0-2f), Stephen McCann 1-0, J. P. Kelly 0-2, Donal Reilly 0-2, Fergal Brady 0-1, Gary Tubman 0-1, Ciaran Crowe 0-1	Report	Brendan Argue 0-6 (0-6f), Declan Reilly 0-1, Sean Cooney 0-1, Peter Clerkin 0-1, Damien Reilly 0-1	Referee: Jimmy Galligan

5 September 2015 Quarter-final	Ballyhaise	0-17 – 0-14	Butlersbridge	Breffni Park
20:30	Stephen Smith 0-7 (0-2f), Padraig Moore 0-4, David Brady 0-2, Kevin Tierney 0-2, Sean McCormack 0-1, Barry McCrudden 0-1	Report	Jonathan Leddy 0-8 (0-2f, 0-1 45), Caoimhin O'Reilly 0-4 (0-1f), Declan Callaghan 0-1, John Fitzpatrick 0-1	Referee: Brendan Sweeney

6 September 2015 Quarter-final	Belturbet	1-8 – 0-10	Swanlinbar	Breffni Park
20:00	Enda Henry 0-4 (0-2f), Cian Vaughan 1-0, Jason O'Reilly 0-2, Niall Lawlor 0-1 (0-1 45), Brendan Fitzpatrick 0-1	Report	Mark Cunningham 0-5 (0-1f), Gearóid McKiernan 0-2, Michael Curran 0-2, Michael Cunningham 0-1	Referee: Noel Mooney

=== Semi-finals ===
18 September 2015 Semi-final	Drumlane	1-7 – 1-11	Ballyhaise	Breffni Park
20:00	Ryan Connolly 0-5 (0-5f), Kian Monahan 1-0, J. P. Kelly 0-1, Ciaran Crowe 0-1	Report	Stephen Smith 0-8 (0-7f), Kevin Tierney 1-2 (1-0 pen), Eamonn Costello 0-1	Referee: Tony Gregory

19 September 2015 Semi-final	Arva	2-10 – 1-10	Belturbet	Breffni Park
17:00	Conal Sheridan 0-7 (0-7f), Peter Conneely 1-0, Ciarán Brady 1-0, Peter Morris 0-2, Jonathan McCabe 0-1	Report	Enda Henry 0-8 (0-6f), Jason O'Reilly 1-0, Cian Vaughan 0-1, Brendan Fitzpatrick 0-1	Referee: Gerry Sheridan

=== Final ===
4 October 2015 Final	Arva	1-14 – 2-13	Ballyhaise	Breffni Park
15:00	Conal Sheridan 0-6 (0-5f), Jonathan McCabe 1-3, Kevin Bouchier 0-2, Peter Morris 0-2, Ciarán Brady 0-1	Report	Stephen Smith 1-6 (0-4f), Kevin Tierney 1-2, Padraig Moore 0-3, Martin Conaty 0-2	Referee: Conor Dourneen
