= 2021 Cavan Intermediate Football Championship =

2021 Cavan IFC
Tournament details
- County: Cavan
- Province: Ulster
- Year: 2021
- Trophy: Tommy Gilroy Cup
- Sponsor: McEvoy's SuperValu, Virginia
- Date: 3 September – 31 October 2021
- Teams: 14

Winners
- Champions: Butlersbridge (1st win)
- Manager: Daragh McCarthy
- Captain: Caoimhin O'Reilly
- Qualify for: 2021 Ulster Club IFC

Runners-up
- Runners-up: Ballyhaise
- Manager: Aidan Watters; Pat Duggan; Noel Walshe; Damien Keaney
- Captain: David Brady

Promotion/Relegation
- Promoted team(s): Butlersbridge
- Relegated team(s): Arva; Drumlane

The 2021 Cavan Intermediate Football Championship was the 57th edition of Cavan GAA's premier Gaelic football tournament for intermediate graded clubs in County Cavan, Ireland. The tournament consists of 14 teams, with the winner representing Cavan in the Ulster Intermediate Club Football Championship.

The championship starts with a league stage and then progresses to a knock out stage.

Butlersbridge defeated Ballyhaise in the final to claim their first Intermediate title.

== Team changes ==
The following teams have changed division since the 2020 championship season.

=== To Championship ===
Promoted from 2020 Cavan Junior Football Championship

- Templeport (Junior Champions)

=== From Championship ===
Promoted to 2021 Cavan Senior Football Championship

- Ballinagh (Intermediate Champions)

Withdrew

- Ramor United B

== League stage ==
Pos	Team	Pld	W	L	D	PD	Pts
1	Ballyhaise	4	4	0	0	+23	8
2	Cuchulainns	4	3	0	1	+10	7
3	Cornafean	4	3	1	0	+20	6
4	Bailieborough Shamrocks	4	3	1	0	+17	6
5	Butlersbridge	4	3	1	0	+13	6
6	Killeshandra	4	3	1	0	+4	6
7	Killinkere	4	2	2	0	-13	4
8	Ballymachugh	4	2	2	0	+3	4
9	Drumgoon	4	1	2	1	-5	3
10	Templeport	4	1	2	1	−9	3
11	Arva	4	1	3	0	−16	2
12	Drumlane	4	0	3	1	−13	1
13	Cootehill	4	0	4	0	−11	0
14	Belturbet	4	0	4	0	−23	0

=== Round 1 ===
3 September 2021 Round 1	Killeshandra	0-11 – 1-13	Arva	Our Lady of Lourdes Park
20:00				Referee: Padraig Sheridan

4 September 2021 Round 1	Killinkere	0-24 – 3-14	Ballymachugh	Breffni Park
16:00				Referee: John Emmo

4 September 2021 Round 1	Ballyhaise	2-14 – 2-11	Cootehill	Breffni Park
19:00				Referee: Conor Dourneen

5 September 2021 Round 1	Drumgoon	0-11 – 0-12	Bailieborough Shamrocks	St Bridget's Park
13:00				Referee: Ollie Donohoe

5 September 2021 Round 1	Templeport	1-13 – 4-19	Cornafean	Breffni Park
13:00				Referee: Noel Mooney

5 September 2021 Round 1	Belturbet	0-14 – 1-14	Cuchulainns	Breffni Park
16:00				Referee: Stephen McKiernan

5 September 2021 Round 1	Butlersbridge	1-14 – 0-12	Drumlane	Breffni Park
19:00				Referee: James Clarke

=== Round 2 ===
10 September 2021 Round 2	Ballymachugh	2-9 – 0-12	Cootehill	Edwin Carolan Community Park
20:00				Referee: Pat Clarke

10 September 2021 Round 2	Cornafean	1-12 – 0-10	Drumgoon	Our Lady of Lourdes Park
20:00				Referee: Stephen McKiernan

10 September 2021 Round 2	Drumlane	0-9 – 1-9	Killeshandra	St Aidan's Park
20:30				Referee: Michael Lee

12 September 2021 Round 2	Arva	0-7 – 1-18	Ballyhaise	Ballinagh GAA Grounds
13:00				Referee: Ollie Donohoe

12 September 2021 Round 2	Belturbet	0-7 – 3-13	Bailieborough Shamrocks	Hugh O'Reilly Memorial Park
13:00				Referee: Margaret Farrelly

12 September 2021 Round 2	Butlersbridge	3-22 – 3-8	Killinkere	Sheelin Park
13:00				Referee: John Power

12 September 2021 Round 2	Cuchulainns	3-12 – 2-15	Templeport	Páirc Emmet
15:00				Referee: John Emmo

=== Round 3 ===
17 September 2021 Round 3	Killeshandra	0-12 – 0-10	Ballymachugh	Our Lady of Lourdes Park
20:00				Referee: Noel Mooney

18 September 2021 Round 3	Drumlane	2-11 – 1-14	Drumgoon	Annalee Park
17:30				Referee: Padraig Sheridan

18 September 2021 Round 3	Arva	2-6 – 0-16	Cuchulainns	Sheelin Park
17:30				Referee: Chris McCaffrey

19 September 2021 Round 3	Butlersbridge	1-10 – 2-14	Templeport	First Ulster Park
14:00				Referee: Martin Sexton

19 September 2021 Round 3	Killinkere	2-11 – 1-10	Belturbet	Athletic Grounds
14:00				Referee: Michael Lee

19 September 2021 Round 3	Cootehill	0-10 – 2-7	Cornafean	Breffni Park
16:00				Referee: Oliver Óg O'Reilly

19 September 2021 Round 3	Ballyhaise	1-11 – 1-10	Bailieborough Shamrocks	Breffni Park
				Referee: Stephen McKiernan

=== Round 4 ===
26 September 2021 Round 4	Drumlane	0-8 – 1-10	Ballyhaise	Joe Crowe Park
16:00				Referee: Michael Lee

26 September 2021 Round 4	Butlersbridge	1-12 – 2-8	Belturbet	First Ulster Park
16:00				Referee: Stephen McKiernan

26 September 2021 Round 4	Killeshandra	3-8 – 1-10	Killinkere	Breffni Park
16:00				Referee: Oliver Óg O'Reilly

26 September 2021 Round 4	Drumgoon	0-9 – 0-8	Templeport	Athletic Grounds
16:00				Referee: Pat Clarke

26 September 2021 Round 4	Cootehill	4-7 – 3-12	Bailieborough Shamrocks	O'Raghallaigh Park
16:00				Referee: Ollie Donohoe

26 September 2021 Round 4	Cuchulainns	0-9 – 0-6	Cornafean	Dr. Plunkett Memorial Park
16:00				Referee: Kieran McCarville

26 September 2021 Round 4	Ballymachugh	3-8 – 2-8	Arva	Our Lady of Lourdes Park
16:00				Referee: John Power

== Knock-Out Stage ==
Quarter-finals
Bailieborough	3-10
Butlersbridge	3-14
Cuchulainns	2-14
Killinkere	1-12
Ballyhaise	1-15
Ballymachugh	1-9
Cornafean	1-8
Killeshandra	1-11

Semi-finals
Butlersbridge	3-9
Cuchulainns	0-12
Ballyhaise	0-17
Killeshandra	1-7

Final
Butlersbridge	1-12
Ballyhaise	0-14

=== Quarter-finals ===
1 October 2021 Quarter-final	Cornafean	1-8 – 1-11	Killeshandra	Breffni Park
20:00				Referee: Noel Mooney

2 October 2021 Quarter-final	Ballyhaise	1-15 – 1-9	Ballymachugh	Ballinagh GAA Grounds
17:00				Referee: Stephen McKiernan

2 October 2021 Quarter-final	Cuchulainns	2-14 – 1-12	Killinkere	Lavey GAA Grounds
17:00				Referee: Margaret Farrelly

3 October 2021 Quarter-final	Bailieborough Shamrocks	3-10 – 3-14	Butlersbridge	Breffni Park
19:00				Referee: Oliver Óg O'Reilly

=== Semi-finals ===
15 October 2021 Semi-final	Butlersbridge	3-9 – 0-12	Cuchulainns	Breffni Park
20:00				Referee: Kieran McCarville

17 October 2021 Semi-final	Ballyhaise	0-17 – 1-7	Killeshandra	Breffni Park
19:00		Report		Referee: Stephen McKiernan

=== Final ===
31 October 2021
15:00
Final

Butlersbridge	1-12 – 0-14	Ballyhaise
Fionntán O'Reilly 0-6 (0-5f), Cathal Leddy 1-0, Caoimhin O'Reilly 0-2 (0-1f), Peter Conaty 0-1 (0-1f), Feargal Flanagan 0-1, Killian Leddy 0-1, John Fitzpatrick 0-1	Report	Kevin Tierney 0-6 (0-5f), Stephen Smith 0-3 (0-3f), Eoin Clarke 0-2, Brían O'Rourke 0-1, Sean McCormack 0-1, David Brady 0-1

Breffni Park
Referee: Barry McMenamin

== Relegation play-offs ==
2 October 2021 Relegation play-off	Arva	1-4 – 0-10	Belturbet	Michael Cully Park
15:00				Referee: Barry McMenamin

2 October 2021 Relegation play-off	Drumlane	0-13 – 1-12	Cootehill	O'Connell Park
17:00				Referee: Martin Sexton
