= Ciarán Brady =

Irish Gaelic footballer (born 1994)

Personal information
- Native name: Ciarán Ó Brádaigh (Irish)
- Nickname: Holla
- Born: 13 April 1994 (age 32) Cavan, Ireland
- Occupation: Primary school teacher
- Height: 6 ft 0 in (183 cm)

Sport
- Sport: Gaelic football
- Position: Wing Back
Club
- Years: Club
- Arva
Inter-county
- Years: County
- 2015–: Cavan
Inter-county titles
- Ulster titles: 1

Ciarán Brady is an Irish Gaelic footballer who plays as a wing back for the Cavan county team. He plays his club football with Arva.

With Arva, Brady has won two Cavan Junior titles and two Cavan Intermediate titles. Brady captained his club to Ulster and All-Ireland Junior honours in 2023–24, as well as an Ulster Intermediate final appearance in 2024.

Brady first represented Cavan at minor level, winning an Ulster Minor Football Championship in 2011. He went on to win back-to-back Ulster Under-21 titles in 2013 and 2014. He made his debut for the Cavan senior team in 2015, and was a key member of the team that won the Ulster Senior Football Championship in 2020. The same year he received his only All Star nomination. His other honours with Cavan include National League medals at Division 3 and Division 4. He was appointed joint-captain of the team in 2024.

== Club career ==
Brady joined the Arva club at a young age and played with the club at all age levels. Due to low numbers, they often amalgamated with neighbouring club Killeshandra at underage level. The St Joseph's amalgamation reached the final of the Cavan Minor Football Championship in 2010, losing to Cavan Gaels after a replay.

Brady later joined the Arva senior team, and the club reached the final of the Cavan Junior Football Championship in 2013. Arva lost the final by a point to Kill Shamrocks. Arva were back in the junior final in 2014. Brady lined out at centre back in Arva's 2–11 to 0–8 win over Ballymachugh.

Promoted to the Cavan Intermediate Football Championship for 2015, Arva reached the final in their first year, with Brady scoring an injury-time goal in the semi-final against Belturbet. Arva faced Ballyhaise in the final on 4 October, with Brady scoring two points as Arva suffered a 2–13 to 1–14 defeat. Arva were in a championship final for the fourth consecutive year in 2016, facing Killinkere in the Intermediate final. Brady scored 1–2 as the match ended in a 3–10 to 1–16 draw. The replay took place on 15 October, Brady scoring two points as Arva were one-point winners.

Arva were back at junior level in 2022, and reached the final against Drumlane. Brady scored a point and the match was level in injury time, but Drumlane won the match with a last-minute free. Brady was captain of the team in 2023, and Arva reached the junior final again. Brady lifted the trophy after Arva's 2–11 to 0–9 win over Knockbride. Arva went on to beat Ballymaguigan in the quarter-final and Lisnaskea in the semi-final to qualify for the final of the Ulster Junior Club Football Championship. Brady scored two points and was man of the match as Arva won the Ulster title with a seven-point win over Blackhill. Arva went on to reach the final of the All-Ireland Junior Club Football Championship with a twelve-point semi-final win over Milltown. The final took place on 14 January 2024 in Croke Park against Listowel Emmets. Brady scored four points from midfield and was named man of the match as he captained his team to the All-Ireland title.

In their first year at the intermediate grade in 2024, Arva reached the final against Butlersbridge. In the final, Brady scored 1–1 in the first half before being substituted with an injury. Arva went on to win the final by ten points, with Brady captaining his club to back-to-back county titles. Arva's championship run continued, beating Drumgath and Magheracloone to reach the final of the Ulster Intermediate Club Football Championship. In the final against Ballinderry, Brady scored a point but Arva's unbeaten run came to an end and lost the final by a point.

== Inter-county career ==
=== Minor, under-21 and junior ===
On 17 July 2011, Brady lined out for the Cavan minor team in the Ulster final against Armagh. A 0–12 to 1–6 victory gave Brady an Ulster Minor medal.

Brady joined the under-21 side in 2013, and started in the Ulster final against Donegal. Cavan were winners on a 0–13 to 1–6 scoreline. Brady later lined out in the All-Ireland semi-final against Cork, where they suffered a one-point defeat. Cavan reached the Ulster final again in 2014, facing Donegal once again. Brady was in the half back line as Cavan were 2–6 to 0–8 winners. Brady later played in the All-Ireland semi-final, scoring a point in Cavan's one-point defeat to eventual champions Dublin. Brady's under-age career with Cavan came to an end in 2015 after a loss to Donegal in the first round.

On 25 June 2014, Brady was a part of the Cavan junior panel for the Leinster final against Longford. Brady came on as a second-half substitute in Cavan's four-point win. Cavan would go on to reach the All-Ireland final against Kerry. The final took place on 23 August, with Brady starting in the half back line. Cavan won the match on a scoreline of 2–14 to 0–14 to win the championship for he first time in 84 years.

=== Senior ===
Brady joined the Cavan senior squad in 2015. On 24 May 2015 he made his championship debut as a substitute against Monaghan in the Ulster championship, scoring a point in the one-point loss. On 20 June 2015 made his first championship start in a qualifier win against London. On 3 April 2016, Brady was in the half back line as Cavan beat Galway to earn promotion to Division 1 of the National Football League. Brady played in the Division 2 final against Tyrone, as Cavan suffered a five-point defeat.

Ahead of the 2018 season, manager Mattie McGleenan named Brady as vice-captain of the team, with Dara McVeety as captain. On 1 April, Brady lined out at centre back for the Division 2 final against Roscommon. Brady scored a point as Roscommon won the match by 4–16 to 4–12.

On 2 June 2019, Brady was sent off in the Ulster semi-final against Armagh. The match finished a draw, and Brady was suspended for the replay as Cavan reached the Ulster final for the first time since 2001. On 23 June, Brady started the Ulster final against Donegal as Cavan fell to a five-point defeat. Cavan were back in the Ulster final in 2020, facing Donegal on 22 November. Brady scored a point as Cavan were 1–13 to 0–12 winners to claim their first Ulster title since 1997. On 5 December, Brady scored a point in the All-Ireland semi-final against Dublin as Cavan exited the championship. Brady was nominated for an All Star for the first time at the end of the season.

On 22 May 2021, in a league match against Longford, Brady was forced off early in the second half with an injury. It was later revealed to be a cruciate ligament injury and Brady missed the rest of the season. On 23 April 2022, Brady made his return from injury, coming on as a late substitute in Cavan's Ulster quarter-final win over Antrim. Cavan went on to play in the Tailteann Cup final against Westmeath, with Brady an unused substitute in the 2–14 to 1–13 loss. On 1 April 2023, Brady was in the half back line for the Division 3 final against Fermanagh, and was named man of the match in Cavan's 0–16 to 1–7 win.

Ahead of the 2024 season, Cavan manager Raymond Galligan appointed Brady as joint-captain of the Cavan senior team, along with Padraig Faulkner.

== Honours ==
Cavan

- Ulster Senior Football Championship: 2020
- National Football League Division 3: 2023
- National Football League Division 4: 2022
- All-Ireland Junior Football Championship: 2014
- Leinster Junior Football Championship: 2014
- Ulster Under-21 Football Championship: 2013, 2014
- Ulster Minor Football Championship: 2011

Arva

- Cavan Intermediate Football Championship: 2016, 2024 (c)
- All-Ireland Junior Club Football Championship: 2023–24 (c)
- Ulster Junior Club Football Championship: 2023 (c)
- Cavan Junior Football Championship: 2014, 2023 (c)

Individual

- Irish News Ulster All-Star: 2020
- Gaelic Life Ulster Club All-Star: 2023

Sporting positions
Preceded by Raymond Galligan	Cavan Senior Football joint-captain 2024– With: Padraig Faulkner	Succeeded by Incumbent
