= Padraig Faulkner (Gaelic footballer) =

Irish Gaelic footballer (born 1994)

Personal information
- Native name: Pádraig Ó Fachtna (Irish)
- Born: 1994 (age 31–32)
- Occupation: Primary school teacher
- Height: 6 ft 1 in (185 cm)

Sport
- Sport: Gaelic football
- Position: Full back
Club
- Years: Club
- Kingscourt Stars
Club titles
- Cavan titles: 2
Inter-county
- Years: County
- 2016–: Cavan
Inter-county titles
- Ulster titles: 1
- All Stars: 1

Padraig Faulkner (born 1994) is an Irish Gaelic footballer who plays as a full back for Kingscourt Stars and the Cavan county team.

== Playing career ==
=== Club ===
Faulkner joined the Kingscourt Stars club at a young age. Kingscourt amalgamated with Shercock for the 2011 Minor championship, and reached the final against Cavan Gaels. Faulkner was in the half-back line as the amalgamation won the final by six points.

Faulkner later joined the club's senior team. On 30 September 2012, Faulkner started at corner back against Mullahoran in his first county final, which ended in a draw. Faulkner kept his position for the replay on 7 October 2012. Faulkner scored a point from play but Kingscourt fell to a 1–8 to 0–7 defeat. Kingscourt returned to the county final again in 2014, facing Cavan Gaels on 12 October. Faulkner started the match at centre back, but was sent off in the 12th minute. Kingscourt played on with 14 men, but a last-minute Micheál Lyng point helped the Gaels to a one-point win. On 11 October 2015, Faulkner played at full back as Kingscourt were in the county final once again, this time against Castlerahan. Kingscourt won the match by 1–9 to 0–11; it was Faulkner's first championship medal.

Faulkner was forced off injured in Kingscourt's semi-final victory over Cavan Gaels in 2020. Despite his injury, he recovered to captain Kingscourt in the final against Crosserlough on 26 September. Faulkner scored a goal in the first half and Kingscourt were in front late on, but Crosserlough equalised to send the game to a replay. Faulkner played in the replay as Kingscourt lost the final by 0–13 to 0–8.

Kingscourt next contested the county final in 2023, facing defending champions Gowna. Faulkner opened the scoring, but Gowna took over the match and went on to win the final by seventeen points. Kingscourt returned to the final in 2025, with Faulkner scoring an injury-time winning point against Ramor United in the semi-final. Kingscourt faced Gowna once again in the final, with Faulkner scoring two points as the Stars overturned the 2023 result to win the final by nine points.

=== Inter-county ===
==== Minor and under-21 ====
Faulkner first represented Cavan at minor level and was on the panel in 2011. Cavan beat Armagh in the Ulster final, but Faulkner didn't feature in the match through injury.

Faulkner later joined the under-21 team in 2014. On 9 April, Faulkner started in the Ulster final against Donegal. Cavan were winners on a 2–6 to 0–8 scoreline. Faulkner later played in Cavan's one-point All-Ireland semi-final defeat to eventual winners Dublin. Faulkner's under-age career with Cavan came to an end in 2015, losing to Donegal in the first round.

==== Senior ====
Faulkner joined the Cavan senior squad ahead of the 2016 season, and made his National League debut on 31 January in a loss to Tyrone. Faulkner kept his place for the rest of the league as Cavan were promoted to Division 1. Faulkner played in the Division 2 final against Tyrone, as Cavan suffered a five-point defeat. Faulkner made his championship debut on 29 May, starting at corner back in an Ulster quarter-final win over Armagh.

On 1 April 2018, Faulkner was at full back for the Division 2 final against Roscommon. Faulkner scored a point as Roscommon won a high-scoring game. In the 2019 championship, Cavan reached the Ulster final for the first time in 18 years. On 23 June, Faulkner started at full back in the Ulster final against Donegal. Donegal were 1–24 to 2–16 winners.

On 22 November 2020, Cavan met Donegal in the Ulster final for the second year in a row. Faulkner lined out at full back as Cavan bridged a 23-year gap with a four-point win. Cavan's championship came to an end against Dublin in the All-Ireland semi-final. Faulkner was named at full back on the All Star team for his performances in the championship.

On 2 April 2022, Faulkner was at full back as Cavan faced Tipperary in the National League Division 4 final. Faulkner scored a point from play in Cavan's 2–10 to 0–15 victory. On 5 June, Faulkner scored a goal in Cavan's comfortable Tailteann Cup quarter-final win over Fermanagh. Faulkner started the final against Westmeath on 9 July. Faulkner scored a second-half goal to put Cavan ahead, but Westmeath finished the match strongly and ended up four-point winners.

Cavan played in their second successive league final in 2023, facing Fermanagh in the Division 3 decider. Faulkner played the full game as Cavan secured their second successive league title; it was also Faulkner's 100th game for Cavan. Cavan's season ended with a Tailteann Cup quarter-final defeat to Down. At the end of the season, Faulkner was named on the Tailteann Cup Team of the Year.

Ahead of the 2024 season, Cavan manager Raymond Galligan appointed Faulkner as joint-captain of the Cavan senior team, along with Ciarán Brady.

== Honours ==
Cavan

- Ulster Senior Football Championship: 2020
- National Football League Division 3: 2023
- National Football League Division 4: 2022
- Ulster Under-21 Football Championship: 2014
- Ulster Minor Football Championship: 2011

Kingscourt Stars

- Cavan Senior Football Championship: 2015, 2025

O'Raghallaigh Gaels

- Cavan Minor Football Championship: 2011

Individual

- All Star Award: 2020
- Tailteann Cup Team of the Year: 2023
- Irish News Ulster All-Star: 2020
- Gaelic Life Cavan Club Footballer of the Year: 2020
- Ulster GAA Writers' Association merit award: April 2016

Sporting positions
Preceded by Raymond Galligan	Cavan Senior Football joint-captain 2024– With: Ciarán Brady	Succeeded by Incumbent
