= Canice Maher =

Irish hurler (born 1991)

Personal information
- Native name: Cainneach Ó Meachair (Irish)
- Born: 1991 (age 34–35) Muckalee, County Kilkenny, Ireland
- Occupation: Primary school teacher
- Height: 6 ft 0 in (183 cm)

Sport
- Sport: Hurling
- Position: Left corner-forward
Clubs
- Years: Club
- Muckalee; St Martin's; St Jude's; East Cavan Gaels
Club titles
- Cavan titles: 0
College
- Years: College
- St Patrick's College
College titles
- Fitzgibbon titles: 0
Inter-county*
Years	County	Apps (scores)
2010-2011 2016-2017 2022-present	Kilkenny; Dublin; Cavan	13 (5-61)
Inter-county titles
- Leinster titles: 0
- All-Irelands: 0
- NHL: 0
- All Stars: 0
- *Inter County team apps and scores correct as of 22:50, 18 May 2024.

Canice Maher (born 1991) is an Irish former hurler. At club level he plays with East Cavan Gaels and at inter-county level with the Cavan senior hurling team. Maher previously played with St Martin's and St Jude's, as well as the Kilkenny and Dublin senior hurling teams.

== Career ==
Maher first came to hurling prominence as a member of the Castlecomer Community School team that won the Leinster Colleges Championship in 2007. He simultaneously lined out with the St Martin's club at juvenile and underage levels before eventually progressing onto the club's senior team. Maher first appeared on the inter-county scene as a member of the Kilkenny minor hurling team that beat Galway in the 2008 All-Ireland minor final before later captaining the team in his second and final season.

Maher was also a member of the extended panel of the Kilkenny under-21 hurling team that lost out to Clare in the 2012 All-Ireland under-21 final, having earlier lined out for the senior team in the 2011 Walsh Cup. After transferring to the St Jude's club, Maher also earned selection to the Dublin senior hurling team. He later joined the East Cavan Gaels club and made his Cavan senior hurling team debut in 2022. Maher was part of the East Cavan Gaels team that beat Cootehill Celtic to win the Cavan SHC title in 2024.

== Honours ==
Castlecomer Community School

- Leinster Colleges Senior Hurling Championship: 2007

East Cavan Gaels

- Cavan Senior Hurling Championship: 2024

Kilkenny

- Leinster Under-21 Hurling Championship: 2012
- All-Ireland Minor Hurling Championship: 2008
- Leinster Minor Hurling Championship: 2008, 2009 (c)

Cavan

- National Hurling League Division 3B: 2023

Sporting positions
Preceded by Thomas Breen	Kilkenny minor hurling team captain 2009	Succeeded by Cillian Buckley
