= 2025 Cavan Senior Hurling Championship =

Annual hurling competition season

- Dates: 7 Jul - 3 Aug 2025
- Teams: 3
- Sponsor: Gilsenan Floors and Doors
- Champions: Cootehill Celtic (9th title)
- Runners-up: East Cavan Gaels

Tournament statistics
- Matches played: 3
- Goals scored: 12 (4 per match)
- Points scored: 129 (43 per match)

The 2025 Cavan Senior Hurling Championship was the 66th staging of the Cavan Senior Hurling Championship since its establishment by the Cavan County Board in 1908.

Three teams contested the championship. East Cavan Gaels entered the championship as the defending champions. Cootehill Celtic and Mullahoran St Joseph's round out the field.

The final was played on 3 August 2024 at Kingspan Breffni Park in Cavan, between East Cavan Gaels and Cootehill Celtic, in what was their third consecutive meeting in the decider. Cootehill Celtic won the match by 0-17 - 0–13 to win their ninth championship.

== Teams ==
The 3 teams who contested the championship were:

Club	Location	Championship titles	Last championship title
Cootehill Celtic	Cootehill	9	2025
East Cavan Gaels	Bailieborough, Kingscourt, Shercock, Mullagh, Virginia	1	2024
Mullahoran	Mullahoran	27	2020

== Group stage ==
=== Group stage table ===
Finalists

Team	Matches				Score			Pts
Team	Pld	W	D	L	For	Against	Diff	Pts
Cootehill Celtic	2	2	0	0	24	23	1	4
East Cavan Gaels	2	1	0	1	62	37	25	2
Mullahoran St Joseph's	2	0	0	2	13	39	-26	0

=== Group stage results ===
7 Jul Round 1	East Cavan Gaels	3-14 - 2-18	Cootehill Celtic	Cavan 3G Pitch

14 Jul Round 2	Mullahoran St Joseph's	1-10 - 6-21	East Cavan Gaels	Our Lady of Lourdes Park

21 Jul Round 3	Cootehill Celtic	w/o - scr.	Mullahoran St Joseph's	Hugh O'Reilly Memorial Park

== Knockout stage ==
=== Bracket ===
Final
3 August
1	Cootehill Celtic	0-17
2	East Cavan Gaels	0-13

=== Final ===
3 Aug 2025 Final	Cootehill Celtic	0-17 - 0-13	East Cavan Gaels	Kingspan Breffni Park
	Mark Moffett (0-7), Dylan McKeever (0-3), Rian Delaney (0-2), Thomas Leonard (0-2), Conor Shalvey (0-2), Diarmaid Carney (0-1)	Report	Nicky Kenny (0-12), Jack McGuinness (0-1)	Referee: John Emo
