= 2023 Cavan Senior Hurling Championship =

Annual hurling competition season

- Dates: 16 July – 6 August 2023
- Teams: 3
- Sponsor: BG Carpentry Services
- Champions: Cootehill Celtic (8th title); Diarmuid Carney (captain); Micheál Boyle (manager)
- Runners-up: East Cavan Gaels

Tournament statistics
- Matches played: 3
- Goals scored: 11 (3.67 per match)
- Points scored: 115 (38.33 per match)

The 2023 Cavan Senior Hurling Championship was the 64th staging of the Cavan Senior Hurling Championship since its establishment by the Cavan County Board in 1908. The championship ran from 16 July to 6 August 2023.

Cootehill Celtic were the defending champions.

The final was played on 6 August 2023 at Kingspan Breffni Park in Cavan, between Cootehill Celtic and East Cavan Gaels, in what was their first ever meeting in the final. Cootehill Celtic won the match by 2–19 to 3–15 to claim their eighth championship title overall and a third consecutive title.

== Group stage ==
=== Group stage table ===
Finalists

Team	Matches				Score			Pts
Team	Pld	W	D	L	For	Against	Diff	Pts
Cootehill Celtic	1	1	0	0	27	7	20	2
East Cavan Gaels	2	1	0	1	22	11	11	2
Mullahoran St Joseph's	2	0	0	2	18	49	-31	0

=== Group stage results ===
16 July 2023 Round 1	Mullahoran St Joseph's	1-08 - 2-16	East Cavan Gaels	Our Lady of Lourdes Park

24 July 2023 Round 2	Cootehill Celtic	2-21 - 1-04	East Cavan Gaels	Joe Crowe Park

Round 3	East Cavan Gaels	cancelled	Cootehill Celtic	Hugh O'Reilly Memorial Park

== Knockout stage ==
=== Final ===
6 August 2023 Final	Cootehill Celtic	2-19 - 3-14	East Cavan Gaels	Kingspan Breffni Park
	T Leonard (1-5, 1f), M Moffett (1-6, 3f); R Delaney (0-3), F Hughes (0-2), D Carney (0-2) D Boyle (0-1); G Fitzpatrick (0-1).		C Maher (0-6, 5f,‘65); R Farrell (1-2), J McGuiness (1-1); J Tully (1-0), N Kenny (0-3), C Walsh (0-1), B Fitzgerald (0-1).	Referee: J Emo (Butlersbridge)
