= 2022 Cavan Senior Hurling Championship =

Annual hurling competition season

- Dates: 1 April – 22 October 2022
- Teams: 4
- Sponsor: Tom Walsh
- Champions: Cootehill Celtic (7th title); Diarmuid Carney (captain); Micheál Doyle (manager)
- Runners-up: Mullahoran St Joseph's

Tournament statistics
- Matches played: 6
- Goals scored: 16 (2.67 per match)
- Points scored: 154 (25.67 per match)

The 2022 Cavan Senior Hurling Championship was the 63rd staging of the Cavan Senior Hurling Championship since its establishment by the Cavan County Board in 1908. The championship ran from 1 April to 22 October 2022.

Cootehill Celtic were the defending champions.

The final was played on 22 October 2022 at Kingspan Breffni Park in Cavan, between Cootehill Celtic and Mullahoran St Joseph's, in what was their sixth meeting in the final overall and a first final meeting in two years. Cootehill Celtic won the match by 1–16 to 0–09 to claim their seventh championship title overall and a second consecutive title.

== Preliminary stage ==
=== Preliminary round ===
1 April 2022 Preliminary round	Cootehill Celtic	5-15 - 0-12	East Cavan Gaels	Cavan 3G Pitch

== Group stage ==
=== Group stage table ===
Finalists

Team	Matches				Score			Pts
Team	Pld	W	D	L	For	Against	Diff	Pts
Cootehill Celtic	3	3	0	0	48	17	31	6
Mullahoran St Joseph's	3	2	0	1	17	16	1	4
East Cavan Gaels	3	1	0	2	44	51	-7	2
Pearse Óg	3	0	0	3	23	48	-25	0

=== Group stage results ===
7 September 2022 Round 1	East Cavan Gaels	1-13 - 1-14	Mullahoran St Joseph's	Edwin Carolan Community Park

21 September 2022 Round 2	Cootehill Celtic	w/o - scr.	Mullahoran St Joseph's	Edwin Carolan Community Park

21 September 2022 Round 2	East Cavan Gaels	1-15 - 3-07	Pearse Óg	Kingspan Breffni Park

28 September 2022 Round 1	Cootehill Celtic	3-21 - 0-07	Pearse Óg	Kingspan Breffni Park

15 October 2022 Round 3	Cootehill Celtic	1-15 - 0-10	East Cavan Gaels	Hugh O'Reilly Memorial Park

15 October 2022 Round 3	Mullahoran St Joseph's	w/o - scr.	Pearse Óg	Sheelin Park

== Knockout stage ==
=== Final ===
22 October 2022 Final	Cootehill Celtic	1-16 - 0-09	Mullahoran St Joseph's	Kingspan Breffni Park
	D Carney (0-6, 2f); R Delaney (1-3); M Moffett (0-3, 2f); T Leonard (0-2); N Clerkin (0-2, 1f, ’65)	Report	D Dalton (0-5 3f, ’65, ’65); R O’Hagan (0-2, 1f); D Sheridan (0-1, pen); B Nannery (0-1).	Referee: J Clarke (Killinkere)
