= 2021 Cavan Senior Hurling Championship =

Annual hurling competition season

- Dates: 9 August – 5 November 2021
- Teams: 4
- Champions: Cootehill Celtic (6th title); Joe Fitzgerald (captain); Brian Brady (manager)
- Runners-up: Pearse Óg

Tournament statistics
- Matches played: 6
- Goals scored: 14 (2.33 per match)
- Points scored: 159 (26.5 per match)

The 2021 Cavan Senior Hurling Championship was the 62nd staging of the Cavan Senior Hurling Championship since its establishment by the Cavan County Board in 1908. The championship ran from 9 August to 5 November 2021

Mullahoran St Joseph's entered the championship as the defending champions, however, they failed to qualify for the final from the group stage.

The final was played on 5 November 2021 at Kingspan Breffni Park in Cavan, between Cootehill Celtic and Pearse Óg, in what was their first ever meeting in the final. Cootehill Celtic won the match by 2–12 to 2–11 to claim their sixth championship title overall and a first title in five years.

== Group stage ==
=== Group stage table ===
Finalists

Team	Matches				Score			Pts
Team	Pld	W	D	L	For	Against	Diff	Pts
Cootehill Celtic	3	2	1	0	56	40	16	5
Pearse Óg	3	2	1	0	43	42	1	5
Mullahoran St Joseph's	3	1	1	1	59	52	7	3
East Cavan Gaels	3	0	0	3	15	39	-24	0

=== Group stage results ===
9 August 2021 Round 1	East Cavan Gaels	0-10 - 2-13	Mullahoran St Joseph's	Hugh O'Reilly Memorial Park
	J Barry 0-4, J McGuinness 0-2, R Farrell 0-2, K McGuinness 0-1, A Baldwin 0-1.		F Reilly 1-3, D Dalton 0-4, C Kelly 1-0, E Dalton 0-2, S McKeogh 0-2, R Smith 0-1, P Brady 0-1.

9 August 2021 Round 1	Pearse Óg	2-12 - 2-13	Cootehill Celtic	Annalee Park
	J Smith 0-9, E Hill 2-0, B O'Rourke 0-2, O Keating 0-1.		C Boyle 0-6, D Carney 1-2, C Shalvey 1-0, C Carney 0-3, R Craig 0-1, E Magee 0-1.

16 August 2021 Round 2	Cootehill Celtic	1-17 - 0-05	East Cavan Gaels	Hugh O'Reilly Memorial Park

23 August 2021 Round 2	Mullahoran St Joseph's	2-17 - 2-19	Pearse Óg	Our Lady of Lourdes Park

30 August 2021 Round 3	Pearse Óg	w/o - scr.	East Cavan Gaels

30 August 2021 Round 3	Mullahoran St Joseph's	2-11 - 0-17	Cootehill Celtic	Our Lady of Lourdes Park

== Knockout stage ==
=== Final ===
5 November 2021 Final	Cootehill Celtic	1-16 - 0-09	Pearse Óg	Kingspan Breffni Park
				Referee: J Emo (Butlersbridge)
