= 2014 Cavan Intermediate Football Championship =

2014 Cavan IFC
Tournament details
- County: Cavan
- Province: Ulster
- Year: 2014
- Trophy: Tommy Gilroy Cup
- Sponsor: Hotel Kilmore
- Date: 26 July - 4 October 2014
- Teams: 14

Winners
- Champions: Cootehill (2nd win)
- Manager: Ciaran O'Malley
- Captain: John McCutcheon
- Qualify for: 2014 Ulster Club IFC

Runners-up
- Runners-up: Ballyhaise
- Manager: Phelim Plunkett
- Captain: Kevin Tierney

Promotion/Relegation
- Promoted team(s): Cootehill
- Relegated team(s): Kill Shamrocks; Mountnugent

Other
- Player of the Year: Enda Hessin (Cootehill)

The 2014 Cavan Intermediate Football Championship was the 50th edition of Cavan GAA's premier Gaelic football tournament for intermediate graded clubs in County Cavan, Ireland. The tournament consists of 14 teams, with the winner representing Cavan in the Ulster Intermediate Club Football Championship.

Cootehill won the championship after a comfortable win over Ballyhaise in the final.

== Team changes ==
The following teams have changed division since the 2013 championship season.

=== To Championship ===
Promoted from 2013 Cavan Junior Football Championship

- Kill Shamrocks (Junior Champions)

Relegated from 2013 Cavan Senior Football Championship

- Belturbet

=== From Championship ===
Promoted to 2014 Cavan Senior Football Championship

- Killeshandra (Intermediate Champions)

Relegated to 2014 Cavan Junior Football Championship

- Ballymachugh

== Opening rounds ==
=== Preliminary round ===
26 July 2014 Preliminary round A	Butlersbridge	1-13 – 2-10	Swanlinbar	Breffni Park
19:30				Referee: Noel Mooney

27 July 2014 Preliminary round B	Cootehill	2-12 – 0-6	Cavan Gaels B	Breffni Park
17:30				Referee: Padraig Kellegher

30 July 2014 Preliminary round A replay	Swanlinbar	3-11 – 0-9	Butlersbridge	First Ulster Park
19:30				Referee: Raymond Kelly

=== Round 1 ===
1 August 2014 Round 1	Belturbet	8-11 – 0-9	Kill Shamrocks	Breffni Park
20:00		Report		Referee: Jim Giblin

1 August 2014 Round 1	Ballyhaise	3-23 – 0-3	Mountnugent	Our Lady of Lourdes Park
20:00				Referee: Thomas Doonan

2 August 2014 Round 1	Laragh United	1-8 – 0-8	Shercock	Breffni Park
18:30				Referee: Harry Conaty

2 August 2014 Round 1	Cootehill	1-7 – 1-5	Drung	Breffni Park
20:00				Referee: Pat Clarke

3 August 2014 Round 1	Bailieborough Shamrocks	2-10 – 1-9	Swanlinbar	Athletic Grounds
15:00		Report		Referee: Conor Dourneen

3 August 2014 Round 1	Killinkere	0-9 – 0-5	Drumlane	St Felim's Park
16:00				Referee: Oliver Óg O'Reilly

== Back-door stage ==
=== Round 2 ===
16 August 2014 Round 2	Drumlane	2-12 – 0-10	Butlersbridge	Breffni Park
20:00				Referee: Jason O'Reilly

16 August 2014 Round 2	Shercock	2-14 – 1-6	Kill Shamrocks	O'Raghallaigh Park
19:00				Referee: Oliver Óg O'Reilly

17 August 2014 Round 2	Drung	3-9 – 0-6	Cavan Gaels B	Hugh O'Reilly Memorial Park
14:00				Referee: Thomas Doonan

17 August 2014 Round 2	Mountnugent	0-13 – 0-8	Swanlinbar	Packie Devlin Memorial Park
17:30				Referee: Jim Giblin

=== Round 3 ===
29 August 2014 Round 3	Shercock	0-12 – 0-11	Drung	O'Raghallaigh Park
20:00				Referee: Margaret Farrelly

30 August 2014 Round 3	Drumlane	4-15 – 0-6	Mountnugent	P. J. Duke Park
18:00				Referee: Kieran McCarville

== Knock-out stage ==
Quarter-finals
Cootehill	0-13
Bailieborough	1-6
Killinkere	1-15; 2-8 (R)
Laragh United	1-15; 0-10 (R)
Ballyhaise	2-9
Drumlane	1-11
Shercock	1-11; 2-12 (R) (aet); 2-12 (2R)
Belturbet	1-11; 0-18 (R) (aet); 3-6 (2R)

Semi-finals
Cootehill	1-13
Killinkere	0-12
Ballyhaise	0-13
Shercock	1-7

Final
Cootehill	3-11
Ballyhaise	0-8

=== Quarter-finals ===
5 September 2014 Quarter-final	Shercock	1-11 – 1-11	Belturbet	Breffni Park
20:00		Report		Referee: Conor Dourneen

6 September 2014 Quarter-final	Ballyhaise	2-9 – 1-11	Drumlane	Breffni Park
18:30		Report		Referee: Brendan Sweeney

7 September 2014 Quarter-final	Laragh United	1-15 – 1-15	Killinkere	Breffni Park
13:00		Report		Referee: Brendan Sweeney

7 September 2014 Quarter-final	Cootehill	0-13 – 1-6	Bailieborough Shamrocks	Breffni Park
18:00		Report		Referee: Martin Brady

13 September 2014 Quarter-final replay	Shercock	2-12 – 0-18	Belturbet	Breffni Park
18:00		Report		Referee: Noel Mooney

14 September 2014 Quarter-final replay	Killinkere	2-8 – 0-13	Laragh United	Breffni Park
18:00		Report		Referee: Joe McQuillan

20 September 2014 Quarter-final second replay	Shercock	2-12 – 3-6	Belturbet	Breffni Park
20:00		Report		Referee: Margaret Farrelly

=== Semi-finals ===
28 September 2014 Semi-final	Cootehill	1-13 – 0-12	Killinkere	Breffni Park
14:00				Referee: Conor Dourneen

28 September 2014 Semi-final	Ballyhaise	0-13 – 1-7	Shercock	Breffni Park
15:30				Referee: Oliver Óg O'Reilly

=== Final ===
4 October 2014 Final	Cootehill	3-11 – 0-8	Ballyhaise	Breffni Park
19:00	Enda Hessin 1-7 (0-3f, 1-0 pen), Tom Hayes 1-1, Dermie Connolly 1-0, Caoimhín Carney 0-2, John Carney 0-1	Report	Kevin Tierney 0-5 (0-3f, 0-1 45), Martin Conaty 0-1 (0-1f), Francis Moore 0-1, Conor Lyons 0-1	Referee: Pat Clarke

== Relegation play-offs ==
=== Semi-final ===
14 September 2014 Relegation Semi-final	Butlersbridge	3-15 – 0-12	Swanlinbar	First Ulster Park
13:00				Referee: Margaret Farrelly

=== Final ===
12 October 2014 Relegation Final	Swanlinbar	0-16 – 1-5	Kill Shamrocks	St Felim's Park
12:00				Referee: Conor Dourneen
