= Killian Clarke =

Cavan Gaelic footballer

Personal information
- Native name: Cillian Ó Cléirigh (Irish)
- Born: 19 September 1993 (age 33)
- Height: 6 ft 3 in (191 cm)

Sport
- Sport: Gaelic Football
- Position: Centre back
Club
- Years: Club
- Shercock
Inter-county
- Years: County
- 2012–: Cavan
Inter-county titles
- Ulster titles: 1

Killian Clarke (born 19 September 1993) is a Gaelic footballer from Shercock, County Cavan, Republic of Ireland; who plays with his club Shercock and for the Cavan county team. He has won Ulster football championship titles at Minor, U21 and Senior grade, as well as a Railway Cup football title with Ulster in 2016.

== Playing career ==
Clarke is a nephew of former Cavan GAA Football forward and past Cavan Minor Football Manager, Jodie Clarke. He plays club football for Shercock GAA.

== Cavan Minors ==
When he was 16, Clarke was selected for Cavan minor trials but was not selected for the county after being told he was too slow so he joined a cross-country team at Shercock AC to improve his speed. He was selected to play Minor Football for Cavan in 2010 and 2011, and was part of the Cavan Minor Team that won the Ulster Minor Championship in 2011.

== Cavan U21's ==
Clarke progressed from Minor in 2011 to U21 in 2012, and won three Ulster U21 titles between 2012 and 2014.

== University ==
Clarke attended university at the University of Ulster in Northern Ireland. During his time there, Clarke contested two Sigerson Cup campaign - including 2016 - when UU were hosts.

== Cavan Senior Football Team ==
Whilst at UU, at the age of 19, Clarke made his inter-county debut for Cavan against Donegal in the Ulster Senior Football Championship. After leaving university, he became a stockbroker in Dublin for Cantor Fitzgerald.

In 2013, Clarke was nominated for the GAA GPA All Stars Awards, being his clubs first GPA All-Star nominee. In 2017, he was named captain of Cavan for the year. This lasted for a year before Clarke stepped down. In 2019, Clarke played in his first Ulster final, losing to Donegal.

In 2019, Clarke received a red card during Cavan's National Football League match against Tyrone at Healy Park. Later in the year, Clarke announced he was stepping away from county football temporarily due to wanting to focus on his personal life after having made 72 senior appearances for his county.

Killian returned to the Cavan panel for the delayed 2020 Ulster Championship campaign, where Cavan defeated Donegal in the Ulster final. Cavan exited the 2020 All-Ireland Championship at the hands of Dublin in the AI Semi-Final. Clarke was part of the Cavan team that won promotion from NFL Division 4 to Division 3 in 2022, winning the NFL Divisional Final against Tipperary in Croke Park in April 2022 in the process.

== Ulster ==
In 2016, Clarke was selected at full back by Ulster Team Manager Pete McGrath to represent Ulster in the Interprovincial Railway Cup. Ulster defeated Munster in the semi-final and overcame Connacht in Pairc Sean MacDiarmada in December 2016, to win his first Railway Cup.

In 2020, Killian was part of the Cavan Senior Football team which won the Ulster Senior Football Championship and secured a second Irish News Ulster All Star Award in the process.

=== International rules ===
In 2015 Clarke was placed on the standby list for the Ireland's International Rules Series against Australia, however did not play. On 25 October 2017, he was named in the Ireland squad for the 2017 International Rules Series against Australia in November. Clarke played for Ireland during the series despite issues with his passport.

== Honours ==
Ulster

- InterProvincial Football (Railway Cup): 2016

Cavan

- Ulster Senior Football Championship (1): 2020
- Ulster Under-21 Football Championship (3): 2012, 2013, 2014
- Ulster Minor Football Championship (1): 2011

Shercock

- Cavan Intermediate Football Championship (1): 2017
- Cavan Junior Football Championship (1): 2011

Individual

- Tailteann Cup Team of the Year (1): 2022
- Irish News Ulster All-Star (2): 2013, 2020

Sporting positions
Preceded by Gearóid McKiernan	Cavan Senior Football Captain; 2017	Succeeded by Dara McVeety
