= 2015 Cavan Senior Football Championship =

2015 Cavan SFC
Tournament details
- County: Cavan
- Province: Ulster
- Year: 2015
- Trophy: Oliver Plunkett Cup
- Sponsor: Hotel Kilmore
- Date: 24 July - 11 October 2015
- Teams: 17
- Defending champions: Cavan Gaels

Winners
- Champions: Kingscourt Stars (11th win)
- Manager: Niall Lynch
- Captain: Alan Clarke
- Qualify for: 2015 Ulster Club SFC

Runners-up
- Runners-up: Castlerahan
- Manager: Michael Reilly
- Captain: Stephen Cooney

Promotion/Relegation
- Relegated team(s): Drumalee; Drumgoon

Other
- Player of the Year: Shane Gray (Kingscourt Stars)

The 2015 Cavan Senior Football Championship was the 107th edition of Cavan GAA's premier club Gaelic football tournament for senior graded teams in County Cavan, Ireland. The tournament consists of 17 teams, with the winner going on to represent Cavan in the Ulster Senior Club Football Championship.

Cavan Gaels were the defending champions, having defeated Kingscourt Stars in the previous years final. Kingscourt ended their reign at the quarter-final stage.

Kingscourt went on to win the championship by beating Castlerahan in the final. This was their 11th title overall, and their first since 2010.

== Team changes ==
The following teams have changed division since the 2014 championship season.

=== To Championship ===
Promoted from 2014 Cavan Intermediate Football Championship

- Cootehill - (Intermediate Champions)

=== From Championship ===
Relegated to 2015 Cavan Intermediate Football Championship

- Redhills

== Opening rounds ==
=== Preliminary rounds ===
24 July 2015 Preliminary Round A	Denn	3-10 – 0-10	Drumgoon	Dolan Park
20:00				Referee: Jimmy Galligan

24 July 2015 Preliminary Round B	Mullahoran	1-9 – 1-8	Kingscourt Stars	Breffni Park
20:00		Report		Referee: Kieran McCarville

9 August 2015 Preliminary Round C	Kingscourt Stars	2-13 – 0-8	Drumgoon	Breffni Park
19:30		Report		Referee: Martin Sexton

=== Round 1 ===
2 August 2015 Round 1	Killeshandra	4-9 – 0-9	Castlerahan	Breffni Park
14:30		Report		Referee: Gerry Sheridan

2 August 2015 Round 1	Mullahoran	1-12 – 0-10	Drumalee	Breffni Park
19:30		Report		Referee: Chris McCaffrey

7 August 2015 Round 1	Killygarry	1-11 – 1-8	Crosserlough	Breffni Park
20:15		Report		Referee: Conor Dourneen

8 August 2015 Round 1	Cavan Gaels	5-11 – 0-4	Cuchulainns	Dolan Park
18:00				Referee: Kieran McCarville

8 August 2015 Round 1	Lacken	1-9 – 0-11	Gowna	Our Lady of Lourdes Park
19:30				Referee: Tony Gregory

9 August 2015 Round 1	Ballinagh	0-15 – 1-7	Denn	Breffni Park
14:30		Report		Referee: Pat Clarke

9 August 2015 Round 1	Cootehill	2-11 – 0-15	Lavey	Breffni Park
18:00		Report		Referee: Stephen McKiernan

16 August 2015 Round 1	Ramor United	0-12 – 1-8	Kingscourt Stars	Breffni Park
14:30		Report		Referee: Brendan Sweeney

=== Round 2A ===
22 August 2015 Round 2A	Cavan Gaels	1-13 – 0-9	Lacken	Breffni Park
18:30		Report		Referee: Joe McQuillan

22 August 2015 Round 2A	Ramor United	2-12 – 1-9	Killygarry	Breffni Park
19:30		Report		Referee: Ollie Donohoe

29 August 2015 Round 2A	Mullahoran	0-11 – 1-8	Ballinagh	Breffni Park
19:30		Report		Referee: James Clarke

30 August 2015 Round 2A	Killeshandra	1-14 – 1-9	Cootehill	Athletic Grounds
18:00		Report		Referee: Martin Sexton

2 September 2015 Round 2A Replay	Mullahoran	3-7 – 0-14 (a.e.t.)	Ballinagh	Breffni Park
20:15		Report		Referee: Chris McCaffrey

== Back-door stage ==
=== Round 2B ===
15 August 2015 Round 2B	Denn	0-15 – 0-10 (a.e.t.)	Drumalee	Breffni Park
18:00		Report		Referee: John Emmo

15 August 2015 Round 2B	Gowna	3-8 – 1-12	Lavey	Breffni Park
19:30		Report		Referee: Chris McCaffrey

16 August 2015 Round 2B	Castlerahan	2-14 – 1-13	Crosserlough	Breffni Park
19:30		Report		Referee: Kieran McCarville

23 August 2015 Round 2B	Kingscourt Stars	0-10 – 1-7 (a.e.t.)	Cuchulainns	Lavey GAA Grounds
13:30				Referee: Margaret Farrelly

30 August 2015 Round 2B Replay	Kingscourt Stars	3-16 – 1-8	Cuchulainns	Dolan Park
13:00				Referee: Packie Smith

=== Round 3 ===
29 August 2015 Round 3	Lacken	1-14 – 0-7	Denn	Sheelin Park
18:00				Referee: Kieran McCarville

5 September 2015 Round 3	Castlerahan	5-10 – 1-5	Gowna	Breffni Park
15:00		Report		Referee: Kieran McCarville

6 September 2015 Round 3	Kingscourt Stars	1-15 – 2-12 (a.e.t.)	Ballinagh	Dolan Park
14:00				Referee: Pat Clarke

6 September 2015 Round 3	Killygarry	2-15 – 0-24 (a.e.t.)	Cootehill	Breffni Park
18:30				Referee: Oliver Óg O'Reilly

12 September 2015 Round 3 Replay	Killygarry	3-19 – 2-16 (a.e.t.)	Cootehill	Breffni Park
18:00		Report		Referee: Ollie Donohoe

13 September 2015 Round 3 Replay	Kingscourt Stars	0-10 – 0-5	Ballinagh	Breffni Park
14:30		Report		Referee: Kieran McCarville

== Knock-out stages ==
Quarter-finals
Kingscourt Stars	0-12
Cavan Gaels	0-10
Killygarry	2-14
Mullahoran	2-8
Castlerahan	2-14
Ramor United	1-8
Killeshandra	2-11
Lacken	1-9

Semi-finals
Kingscourt Stars	1-11
Killygarry	1-9
Castlerahan	0-13
Killeshandra	0-9

Final
Kingscourt Stars	1-9
Castlerahan	0-11

=== Quarter-finals ===
12 September 2015 Quarter-final	Killeshandra	2-11 – 1-9	Lacken	Breffni Park
19:30	Declan McKiernan 0-4 (0-2f), Daniel Luby 1-0, Austin Fitzpatrick 1-0, Paddy King 0-3, Shane O'Reilly 0-2, Tomas O'Reilly 0-2	Report	Conor Finnegan 1-4, Finbar O'Reilly 0-4 (0-4f), Niall McKiernan 0-1	Referee: James Clarke

13 September 2015 Quarter-final	Castlerahan	2-14 – 1-8	Ramor United	Breffni Park
19:00	Cian Mackey 2-2 (1-0 pen), Enda Flanagan 0-3 (0-2f), Oisin O'Connell 0-3, Cian McEnroe 0-2 (0-1f), Cormac Daly 0-1, Daniel Lynch 0-1, Sean Fitzpatrick 0-1, Stefan Connolly 0-1 OP	Report	Conor Bradley 0-3, Ronan Keating 1-0, Jack Brady 0-2 (0-1f), Stephen Monaghan 0-2, Jack Doyle 0-1 (0-1f)	Referee: Joe McQuillan

19 September 2015 Quarter-final	Killygarry	2-14 – 2-8	Mullahoran	Breffni Park
18:30	Brian Sheanon 0-5 (0-3f), Conor Smith 1-2, Martin Reilly 0-3, Brendan Murray 1-0, Darragh Gannon 0-2, Ross Sheridan 0-1, Donal Thomas 0-1	Report	Paul Brady 2-2, Enda O'Reilly 0-3 (0-1f), Sean McKeogh 0-2, Chris Prior 0-1	Referee: Kieran McCarville

19 September 2015 Quarter-final	Kingscourt Stars	0-12 – 0-10	Cavan Gaels	Breffni Park
20:00	Barry Reilly 0-8 (0-5f, 0-2 '45), Keith McCabe 0-1, Christy McGowan 0-1, Darragh Gunne 0-1, Cian McArdle 0-1	Report	Martin Dunne 0-4 (0-2f, 0-2 '45), Seanie Johnston 0-4, Niall Murray 0-1, Vinny Coyle 0-1 (0-1f)	Referee: Ollie Donohoe

=== Semi-finals ===
26 September 2015 Semi-final	Castlerahan	0-13 – 0-9	Killeshandra	Breffni Park
20:00	Cian Mackey 0-4 (0-1f), Oisin O'Connell 0-4, Cian McEnroe 0-2 (0-2f), Cormac Daly 0-1, Paul Smith 0-1, Enda Flanagan 0-1	Report	Declan McKiernan 0-2 (0-2f), Daniel Luby 0-2, Paddy King 0-2, Cillian O'Reilly 0-1, Aaron Brady 0-1, Austin Fitzpatrick 0-1	Referee: Oliver Óg O'Reilly

27 September 2015 Semi-final	Kingscourt Stars	1-11 – 1-9	Killygarry	Breffni Park
16:45	Darragh Gunne 1-4 (0-1f), Barry Reilly 0-4 (0-3f), Keith McCabe 0-1, Barry Tully 0-1, Peter Corrigan 0-1	Report	Brian Sheanon 0-7 (0-6f), Daniel Talbot 1-0, Martin Reilly 0-2 (0-2f)	Referee: Brendan Sweeney

=== Final ===
11 October 2015
15:00
Final

Kingscourt Stars	1-9 – 0-11	Castlerahan
Philip Tinnelly 1-1, Peter Corrigan 0-3, Barry Reilly 0-3 (0-1f, 2 '45), Christy McGowan 0-1, Cian McArdle 0-1	Report	Cian Mackey 0-3 (0-3f), Cormac Daly 0-2, Enda Flanagan 0-2, Paul Smith 0-1, Ronan Flanagan 0-1, Cian McEnroe 0-1 (0-1f), Oisin O'Connell 0-1

Breffni Park
Attendance: 5,284
Referee: Noel Mooney

== Relegation play-offs ==
=== Preliminary relegation play-off ===
18 September 2015 Preliminary relegation play-off	Cuchulainns	4-17 – 1-6	Drumgoon	O'Raghallaigh Park
20:15				Referee: Tony Gregory

=== Relegation Finals ===
19 September 2015 Relegation Final	Lavey	1-16 – 1-11	Drumalee	St. Matthew's Park
15:00				Referee: Jim Giblin

3 October 2015 Relegation Final	Crosserlough	2-14 – 0-8	Drumgoon	St. Matthew's Park
17:00
