= Gearóid McKiernan =

Cavan Gaelic footballer (born 1990)

Personal information
- Native name: Gearóid Mac Thiarnán (Irish)
- Born: 17 September 1990 (age 36)
- Height: 6 ft 4 in (193 cm)

Sport
- Sport: Gaelic Football
- Position: Centre forward
Clubs
- Years: Club
- –2019 2020–: Swanlinbar; Cavan Gaels
Inter-county*
Years	County	Apps (scores)
2011–	Cavan	36 (5-103)
Inter-county titles
- Ulster titles: 1
- *Inter County team apps and scores correct as of 8 May 2022.

Gearóid McKiernan (born 17 September 1990) is an Irish Gaelic footballer who plays for the Cavan county team. He plays with the Cavan Gaels club, and formerly with his home club Swanlinbar.

== Playing career ==
=== Club ===
==== Swanlinbar ====
McKiernan joined the Swanlinbar club at a young age and played at all grades underage.

McKiernan was on the Swanlinbar team in 2006 that won the Cavan Junior Football Championship.

Swanlinbar reached the Junior final again in 2009, but were beaten by Butlersbridge.

The following year Swanlinbar were back in the Junior Final, where they faced 2006 runners-up Munterconnaught. McKiernan won his second Junior Championship medal and was named man of the match in the final. Swanlinbar later progressed to the final of the Ulster Junior Club Football Championship, where they faced Monaghan champions Corduff. Corduff won the final by five points. However it was later revealed that Corduff played an ineligible player, and after an appeal Swanlinbar were crowned Ulster Junior Champions. Swanlinbar later played Meath's Ballinabrackey in the All-Ireland semi-final, winning by 0–5 to 0–4. Swanlinbar faced St Mary's of Kerry in the final at Croke Park on 12 February 2011. Swanlinbar were outclassed in the final and fell to a fourteen-point defeat.

==== Cavan Gaels ====
In late 2019, McKiernan transferred from Swanlinbar to Cavan Gaels ahead of the 2020 season.

On 31 July 2022, McKiernan was in the full forward line as the Gaels faced Crosserlough in the league final. McKiernan scored 3-14 but came out on the losing side, with Crosserlough winning by 6–18 to 4–23 after extra-time.

=== Inter-county ===
==== Minor and under-21 ====
McKiernan first played for Cavan at minor level, however he had no success at this grade.

McKiernan later progressed to the Under-21 team. On 7 April 2010, McKiernan lined out at midfield in a 2–8 to 0–7 defeat in the Ulster Final against Donegal.

McKiernan captained the side in the 2011 season. Cavan once again reached the Ulster Final, this time against Tyrone. On 13 April 2011, McKiernan scored 2 points from midfield in the final as Cavan secured their first under-21 title since 1996. Cavan defeated Wexford in the All-Ireland semi-final later that week to reach the final against Galway. On 1 May 2011, McKiernan captained Cavan from midfield in the All-Ireland final. Cavan were outclassed on the day and fell to a 2–16 to 1–9 defeat.

==== Senior ====
McKiernan joined the senior squad after the under-21 success in 2011. On 12 June 2011, McKiernan scored a point on his championship debut in an Ulster quarter-final defeat by Donegal.

McKiernan missed the entirety of Cavan's 2013 season with a cruciate ligament injury.

On 27 April 2014, McKiernan was at midfield as Cavan faced Roscommon in the National League Division 3 Final. McKiernan scored 0-2 but Roscommon were winners on a 1–17 to 0–18 scoreline.

McKiernan captained Cavan in the 2016 season. On 3 April, McKiernan scored five points against Galway in the National League as Cavan earned promotion to the top flight for the first time in 15 years. McKiernan started the Division 2 Final against Tyrone on 24 April, scoring three points in the five-point defeat.

Cavan faced Roscommon in the National League Division 2 Final on 1 April 2018. McKiernan scored a point in the 4–16 to 4–12 loss.

On 9 June 2019, Cavan faced Armagh in the Ulster semi-final replay. McKiernan scored three points from play as Cavan reached their first Ulster Final since 2001. On 23 June 2019, McKiernan started at midfield in the Ulster Final against Donegal. McKiernan scored six points, but Donegal ran out five-point winners.

On 22 November 2020, Cavan met Donegal in the Ulster Final for the second year in a row. McKiernan started at centre forward and scored two points as Cavan won their first title since 1997. McKiernan scored a point in the All-Ireland semi-final loss Dublin on 5 December. McKiernan was nominated for an All-Star award for the first time at the end of the season.

On 2 April 2022, McKiernan started the National League Division 4 final against Tipperary at Croke Park, and scored a point in the 2–10 to 0–15 win. McKiernan started the inaugural Tailteann Cup final against Westmeath on 9 July. McKiernan scored 3 points but Westmeath finished strongly and came out four-point winners. McKiernan was named on the Tailteann Cup Team of the Year at the end of the season.

== Personal and Family life ==
His maternal uncle is former Fermanagh player and manager Dominic Corrigan. His cousin Tomás Corrigan has also played for Fermanagh.

He married Cavan ladies' footballer Donna English on 9 June 2021. They have one child Setanta.

== Career statistics ==
As of match played 8th May 2022.

Team	Year	National League			Ulster		All-Ireland		Total	
Team	Year	Division	Apps	Score	Apps	Score	Apps	Score	Apps	Score
Cavan	2011	Division 3			1	0-01	1	0-00	2	0-01
Cavan	2012	Division 3			1	0-01	2	1-03	3	1-04
Cavan	2013	Division 3	- Missed entire season due to a cruciate ligament injury - -							
Cavan	2014	Division 3			1	0-02	2	0-01	3	0-03
Cavan	2015	Division 2			1	0-02	2	1-07	3	1-09
Cavan	2016	Division 2			3	0-10	2	0-09	5	0-19
Cavan	2017	Division 1			1	0-01	2	1-07	3	1-08
Cavan	2018	Division 2			1	0-07	3	1-12	4	1-19
Cavan	2019	Division 1			4	0-15	1	0-02	5	0-17
Cavan	2020	Division 2			4	0-11	1	0-01	5	0-12
Cavan	2021	Division 3			1	0-06	-		1	0-06
Cavan	2022	Division 4			2	1-05	-		2	1-05
Career total					20	1-61	16	4-42	36	5-103

== Honours ==
Cavan

- Ulster Senior Football Championship: 2020
- National Football League Division 3: 2023
- National Football League Division 4: 2022
- Ulster Under-21 Football Championship: 2011 (c)

Swanlinbar

- Ulster Junior Club Football Championship: 2010
- Cavan Junior Football Championship: 2006, 2010

Individual

- Tailteann Cup Team of the Year: 2022
- Irish News Ulster All-Star: 2020

Sporting positions
Preceded by Damien O'Reilly	Cavan Senior Football Captain; 2016	Succeeded by Killian Clarke
