= 2015 Cavan Junior Football Championship =

Cavan J.F.C.
- Season: 2015
- Champions: Templeport
- Relegated: N/A
- Matches: 20

The Cavan Junior Football Championship is an annual Gaelic Athletic Association club competition between the third-tier Cavan Gaelic football clubs. It was first competed for in 1913. The winner qualifies to represent their county in the Ulster Club Championship and in turn, go on to the All-Ireland Junior Club Football Championship. The current champions are Templeport St Aidans who defeated Cornafean GFC in the 2015 decider on a scoreline of 1-16 to 1-12.

== Format ==
11 teams will contest the Hotel Kilmore Junior Championship in 2015.

Teams have been drawn into 3 groups, two with 4 team (Group 1 & 2) and one with 3 teams, (Group 3). The group stages will be played on a league basis. Where teams finish on equal points group placings will be decided in accordance with rule 6.20 of the GAA Official Guide 2013.

The top team in each group will qualify for the semi-finals. The runner up of each group will play off, with the winner qualifying for the semi-final.

Semi-final pairings will be based on an open draw.

== 2015 Championship ==
=== Group stage ===
==== Group A ====
Group Winner Play-off Qualifier

Team	Pld	W	D	L	F	A	Diff	Pts
Kill (Q)	3	3	0	0	49	23	26	6
Munterconnaught (Q)	3	2	0	1	66	37	29	4
Corlough	3	1	0	2	55	62	-7	2
Maghera MacFinns	3	0	0	3	11	59	-48	0

31 July 2015
7.45pm
Round 1

Kill	2-10 - 1-9	Munterconnaught

PJ Duke Park, Cavan
Referee: Jason O'Reilly (Cavan)

2 August 2015
1.00pm
Round 1

Corlough	4-14 0-8	Maghera MacFinns

Kingspan Breffni Park, Cavan
Referee: John Emmo (Cavan)

8 August 2015
6.00pm
Round 2

Kill	5-18 - 1-8	Corlough

St. Felim's Park, Cavan
Referee: TBC (Cavan)

9 August 2015
2.00pm
Round 2

Munterconnaught	5-18 - 0-3	Maghera MacFinns

Lavey GAA, Cavan
Referee: (Cavan)

14 August 2015
8.15pm
Round 3

Munterconnaught	2-15 - 3-9	Corlough

St. Aidean's Park, Cavan
Referee: Conor Dourneen (Cavan)

16 August 2015
1.00pm
Round 3

Kill	W/O	Maghera MacFinns

Athletic Grounds, Cavan
Referee: TBC (Cavan)

==== Group B ====
Group Winner Play-off Qualifier

Team	Pld	W	D	L	F	A	Diff	Pts
Cornafean (Q)	3	2	1	0	45	29	16	5
Templeport (Q)	3	2	0	1	58	28	30	4
Shannon Gaels	3	1	0	2	30	58	-28	2
Ballymachugh	3	0	1	2	32	50	-18	1

2 August 2015
6.00pm
Round 1

Shannon Gaels	3-8 - 2-9	Ballymachugh

Ballyconnell, Cavan
Referee: Martin Sexton (Cavan)

9 August 2015
5.00pm
Round 1

Cornafean	1-11 - 1-10	Templeport

Packie Devlin Park, Cavan
Referee: Oliver Óg O'Reilly (Cavan)

16 August 2015
2.30pm
Round 2

Cornafean	3-11 - 0-5	Shannon Gaels

Athletic Grounds, Cavan
Referee: Mg Brady (Cavan)

16 August 2015
6.00pm
Round 2

Templeport	2-16 - 0-6	Ballymachugh

Kingspan Breffni Park, Cavan
Referee: Packie Smith (Cavan)

23 August 2015
1.00pm
Round 3

Templeport	1-20 - 1-5	Shannon Gaels

Corlough GAA Grounds, Cavan
Referee: Michael Lee (Cavan)

23 August 2015
1.00pm
Round 3

Cornafean	1-8 - 1-8	Ballymachugh

Ballinagh GAA Grounds, Cavan
Referee: Jimmy Galligan (Cavan)

==== Group C ====
Group Winner Play-off Qualifier

Team	Pld	W	D	L	F	A	Diff	Pts
Mountnugent (Q)	2	1	0	1	33	28	5	2
Knockbride (Q)	2	1	0	1	28	30	-2	2
Kildallan	1	1	0	1	27	30	-3	2

8 August 2015
7.00pm
Round 1

Knockbride	2-10 - 2-5	Kildallan

P.J. Duke Park, Cavan
Referee: TBC (Cavan)

16 August 2015
1.00pm
Round 2

Kildallan	2-10 1-11	Mountnugent

Kingspan Breffni Park. Cavan
Referee: Jim Giblin (Cavan)

21 August 2015
8.30pm
Round 3

Mountnugent	3-10 - 0-12	Knockbride

Kingspan Breffni Park, Cavan
Referee: (Cavan)

=== Semi-final play-off ===
28 August 2015
8.15pm
Playoff 1

Templeport	1-11 - 0-10	Knockbride

Kingspan Breffni Park, Cavan
Referee: Raymond Tynan (Cavan)

6 September 2015
1.00pm
Playoff 2

Templeport	4-12 - 2-9	Munterconnaught

Lacken GAA, Cavan
Referee: Harry Conaty (Cavan)

=== Semi-finals ===
11 September 2015
8.15pm
Semi-final 1

Cornafean	2-18 - 1-4	Kill

Kingspan Breffni Park, Cavan
Referee: Raymond Tynan (Cavan)

13 September 2015
1.00pm
Semi-final 2

Templeport	3-14 - 0-11	Mountnugent

Kingspan Breffni Park, Cavan
Referee: Conor Dourneen (Cavan)

=== Final ===
27 September 2015
3.00pm
Final

Templeport	1-16 - 1-12	Cornafean

Kingspan Breffni Park, Cavan
Referee: Michael Lee (Cavan)
