= Raymond Galligan =

Irish Gaelic footballer and manager

Personal information
- Native name: Réamoinn Ó Gealagáin (Irish)
- Nickname: Hollywood
- Born: 30 May 1987 (age 39)
- Height: 6 ft 1 in (185 cm)

Sport
- Sport: Gaelic Football
- Position: Goalkeeper
Club
- Years: Club
- Lacken
Inter-county
- Years: County
- 2006–2023: Cavan
Inter-county titles
- Ulster titles: 1
- All Stars: 1

Raymond Galligan (born 30 May 1987) is an Irish Gaelic footballer and manager who has been the manager of the Cavan senior football team since 2023.

A member of the Cavan senior team from 2006 to 2023, Galligan captained Cavan to the Ulster Championship in 2020 and also won an All Star Award. He played with the Lacken club, winning the Cavan Intermediate Football Championship in 2004 and 2012.

== Playing career ==
=== Club ===
Galligan has played with the Lacken club at all levels. Galligan made his club debut in 2002 and was on the Lacken team that faced Drung in the final of the Cavan Intermediate Football Championship in 2004, scoring a point in their 1–9 to 1–8 win.

On 7 October 2012, Galligan captained Lacken in the Intermediate final against Cootehill. Galligan scored 1–5 from full forward as the game ended in a draw. In the replay on 13 October, Galligan scored two points in the 3–10 to 1–9 win, winning his second Intermediate title.

In 2016 Galligan captained Lacken from full forward to their first ever Division One league title, defeating Kingscourt Stars in the final.

=== Inter-county ===
==== Minor and under-21 ====
Galligan represented Cavan at minor and under-21 level but had little success in either grade.

==== Senior ====
Galligan joined the senior team in 2006, making his debut as a substitute against Antrim in the Tommy Murphy Cup. In his National League debut against Roscommon in 2010, Galligan top-scored with ten points. Galligan made his Ulster championship debut on 20 May 2012, coming on as a substitute in a loss to Donegal.

Ahead of the 2015 season, Cavan manager Terry Hyland tried Galligan as a goalkeeper because of his kicking ability. Galligan credits Gary Rogers with helping him to improve the shot-stopping aspect of his game. On 24 May 2015, Galligan started in goal against Monaghan in the Ulster championship.

On 3 April 2016, Galligan kicked two 45s against Galway in the National League, as Cavan earned promotion to the top flight for the first time in 15 years. On 24 April, Galligan started the Division 2 Final against Tyrone, kicking a free in the five-point loss.

On 1 April 2018, Galligan started the National League Division 2 Final against Roscommon. Galligan scored a free in the 4–16 to 4–12 loss.

Galligan was named Cavan captain at the start of the 2019 season. On 23 June 2019, Galligan captained Cavan against Donegal in their first Ulster Final in 18 years. Donegal ran out winners on a 1–24 to 2–16 scoreline.

On 31 October 2020, Cavan faced Monaghan in the Ulster preliminary round. Galligan kicked a 58-metre free late in extra time as Cavan won by a single point. Galligan captained Cavan in their second successive Ulster Final on 22 November, again against Donegal. Cavan were winners by four points and Galligan became the first Cavan man since Stephen King to lift the Anglo-Celt Cup. Cavan were well beaten by Dublin at the semi-final stage. At the end of the championship, Galligan was named on The Sunday Game Team of the Year. Galligan was later selected as the goalkeeper on the All Star team.

On 2 April 2022, Galligan was in goal as Cavan faced Tipperary in the National League Division 4 final. Galligan scored a point from a 45 as Cavan were winners on a 2–10 to 0–15 scoreline. On 28 May, Galligan kicked seven points and saved a penalty twice against Down in a first round Tailteann Cup win. Cavan went on to reach the decider against Westmeath on 9 July. Westmeath were four-point winners.

Cavan played in their second successive league final in 2023, facing Fermanagh in the Division 3 decider. Galligan top scored with four points from placed balls as Cavan claimed their second successive league title. Galligan's last match for Cavan was on 17 June, a Tailteann Cup quarter-final loss to Down.

== Managerial career ==
On 24 July 2023, it was reported that Galligan was named as one of three people shortlisted for the Cavan manager's position to replace the outgoing Mickey Graham. On 23 August, Galligan was proposed for a three-year term as Cavan manager, and was ratified on 11 September. Galligan confirmed that upon taking the manager's role, he had retired from playing with the team.

Galligan approached Gowna native Eamonn Murray, and Murray agreed to take up the role of assistant manager and mentor to Galligan. Galligan was the second-youngest inter-county manager at the time.

== Honours ==
Cavan

- Ulster Senior Football Championship: 2020 (c)
- National Football League Division 3: 2023 (c)
- National Football League Division 4: 2022 (c)

Lacken

- Cavan Intermediate Football Championship: 2004, 2012 (c)
- Cavan Division 1 League: 2016 (c)

Individual

- All Star Award: 2020
- The Sunday Game Team of the Year: 2020
- Ulster GAA President's Awards Footballer of the Year: 2020
- Irish News Ulster All-Star: 2016, 2020

Sporting positions
Preceded by Dara McVeety	Cavan Senior Football Captain; 2019–2023	Succeeded by Padraig Faulkner; Ciarán Brady
Preceded by Mickey Graham	Cavan Senior Football Manager; 2023–	Succeeded by Incumbent
