= Damien O'Reilly =

Cavan Gaelic footballer

Personal information
- Born: 1967 (age 58–59) County Cavan
- Height: 6 ft 0 in (183 cm)

Sport
- Sport: Gaelic football
- Position: Centre Back
Club
- Years: Club
- Mullahoran
Club titles
- Cavan titles: 1
Inter-county
- Years: County
- 1984-1998: Cavan
Inter-county titles
- Ulster titles: 1

Damien O'Reilly is a former Gaelic footballer who played for the Cavan county team.

== Playing career ==
O’Reilly was a versatile footballer, he could play in defence or as a forward. He helped Cavan reach the All-Ireland Under 21 Football Championship final in 1988, but they were defeated by Offaly. In 1989 Cavan had a great run in the National Football League claiming the Div. 2 title and reaching the semi-final, only to lose narrowly to Dublin in Croke Park. In the same year he won a Dr McKenna Cup medal when Cavan defeated Derry in the Final. He was a member of the Cavan squad that lost out in the Ulster Final in 1996. But, in 1997, O'Reilly set up Jason Reilly to score the winning goal and helped Cavan claim their first Ulster Senior Football Championship title in 28 years, beating Derry in Clones.

He is perhaps best remembered for scoring an equalizing hooked point for Cavan in 1992 against Donegal.

== Honours ==
Mullahoran

- Cavan Senior Football Championship (1): 1998

Cavan

- Ulster Senior Football Championship (1): 1997
- Dr McKenna Cup (1): 1988
- National Football League Division 2 (1): 1989
- Ulster Under-21 Football Championship (1): 1988
