= 2024 Cavan Senior Hurling Championship =

Annual hurling competition season

- Dates: 23 January – 4 August 2024
- Teams: 3
- Sponsor: Gilsenan Floors and Doors
- Champions: East Cavan Gaels (1st title); Rory Farrell (captain); Adam Baldwin (manager)
- Runners-up: Cootehill Celtic; Micheál Boyle (manager)

Tournament statistics
- Matches played: 3
- Goals scored: 9 (3 per match)
- Points scored: 105 (35 per match)

The 2024 Cavan Senior Hurling Championship was the 65th staging of the Cavan Senior Hurling Championship since its establishment by the Cavan County Board in 1908. The championship ran from 23 January to 4 August 2024.

Cootehill Celtic entered the championship as the defending champions.

The final was played on 4 August 2024 at Kingspan Breffni Park in Cavan, between East Cavan Gaels and Cootehill Celtic, in what was their second consecutive meeting in the final. East Cavan Gaels won the match by 0–15 to 1–09 to claim their first ever championship title.

== Group stage ==
=== Group stage table ===
Finalists

Team	Matches				Score			Pts
Team	Pld	W	D	L	For	Against	Diff	Pts
Cootehill Celtic	2	2	0	0	19	6	13	4
East Cavan Gaels	2	1	0	1	44	34	10	2
Mullahoran St Joseph's	2	0	0	2	15	38	-23	0

=== Group stage results ===
23 Jan Round 1	East Cavan Gaels	1-03 - 2-13	Cootehill Celtic	Cavan 3G Pitch

15 Jul Round 2	Mullahoran St Joseph's	1-12 - 4-26	East Cavan Gaels	Our Lady of Lourdes Park

22 Jul Round 3	Cootehill Celtic	w/o - scr.	Mullahoran St Joseph's	Hugh O'Reilly Memorial Park

== Knockout stage ==
=== Final ===
4 August 2024 Final	Cootehill Celtic	1-09 - 0-15	East Cavan Gaels	Kingspan Breffni Park
	D Carney 1-0; C Shalvey 0-3 (fs); L McKenna, R Delaney 0-2 each; N Fitzpatrick, C Farrelly 0-1 each.	Report	L O’Brien 0-9 (4f); C Maher, R Farrell 0-2 each; N Kenny, J Tully 0-1 each.	Referee: J Emmo (Butlersbridge)
