= 2014 Cavan Junior Football Championship =

Cavan J.F.C.
- Season: 2014
- Champions: Arva
- Relegated: N/A
- Ulster JCFC: Arva
- All Ireland ICFC: N/A
- Matches: 17

The Cavan Junior Football Championship is an annual Gaelic Athletic Association club competition between the third-tier Cavan Gaelic football clubs. It was first competed for in 1913. The winner qualifies to represent their county in the Ulster Club Championship and in turn, go on to the All-Ireland Junior Club Football Championship. The current champions are Kill, who defeated Arva in the 2013 decider on a scoreline of 1-14 to 1-13.

== Format ==
10 teams will contest the Hotel Kilmore Junior Championship in 2014.

Teams have been drawn into 3 groups, one of 4 teams (Group 1) and two of 3 teams (Group 2 & 3). The group stages will be played on a league basis. Where teams finish on equal points group placings will be decided in accordance with rule 6.20 of the GAA Official Guide 2013.

The top team in each group will qualify for the semi-finals. The runner up in group 2 and 3 will play off, with the winner qualifying to play in a further playoff against the runner up in group 1. The winner of this play off will qualify for the semi-final.

Semi-final pairings will be based on an open draw.

== Group A ==
Group Winner Play-off Qualifier

Team	Pld	W	D	L	F	A	Diff	Pts
Cornafean (Q)	3	3	0	0	60	18	42	6
Templeport (Q)	3	2	0	1	64	28	36	4
Corlough	3	1	0	2	32	61	-29	2
Maghera MacFinns	3	0	0	3	21	70	-49	0

2 August 2014
5.00pm
Round 1

Templeport	3-17 - 1-6	Corlough

Kingspan Breffni Park, Cavan
Referee: Martin Sexton (Cavan)

3 August 2014
2.00pm
Round 1

Cornafean	3-16 - 0-2	Maghera MacFinns

St. Matthew's Park, Crosskeys, Cavan
Referee: Margaret Farrelly (Cavan)

16 August 2014
7.00pm
Round 2

Cornafean	3-14 - 0-7	Corlough

Rory O'Moore Park, Cavan
Referee: Stephen McKiernan (Cavan)

17 August 2014
2.00pm
Round 2

Templeport	4-17 - 0-7	Maghera MacFinns

Lacken GAA Grounds, Cavan
Referee: Declan McCabe (Cavan)

30 August 2014
6.00pm
Round 3

Corlough	2-10 - 0-12	Maghera MacFinns

Rory O'Moore Park, Cavan
Referee: Jason O'Reilly (Cavan)

31 August 2014
6.00pm
Round 3

Cornafean	0-12 - 1-6	Templeport

Ballyconnell, Cavan
Referee: Packie Smith (Cavan)

== Group B ==
Group Winner Play-off Qualifier

Team	Pld	W	D	L	F	A	Diff	Pts
Ballymachugh (Q)	2	2	0	0	33	29	4	4
Arva (Q)	2	1	0	1	29	25	4	2
Munterconnaught'	2	0	0	2	29	37	-8	0

3 August 2014
5.30pm
Round 1

Arva	1-8 - 1-11	Ballymachugh
	Report

Kingspan Breffni Park, Cavan
Referee: Packie Smith (Cavan)

17 August 2014
3.30pm
Round 2

Arva	2-12 - 1-8	Munterconnaught

Lacken GAA Grounds, Cavan
Referee: Padraig Kellegher (Cavan)

31 August 2014
6.00pm
Round 3

Ballymachugh	2-13 - 2-12	Munterconnaught

Kingspan Breffni Park, Cavan
Referee: Tony Gregory (Cavan)

== Group C ==
Group Winner Play-off Qualifier

Team	Pld	W	D	L	F	A	Diff	Pts
Shannon Gaels (Q)	2	1	1	0	54	29	25	3
Kildallan (Q)	2	0	2	0	37	37	0	2
Knockbride	2	0	1	1	20	45	-25	1

3 August 2014
3.00pm
Round 1

Knockbride	2-8 - 2-8	Kildallan

P.J. Duke Park, Stradone, Cavan
Referee: Padraig Sheridan (Cavan)

17 August 2014
5.30pm
Round 2

Shannon Gaels	6-13 - 0-6	Knockbride

Kingspan Breffni Park, Cavan
Referee: Mg Brady (Cavan)

30 August 2014
6.00pm
Round 3

Kildallan	4-11 - 3-14	Shannon Gaels

St. Mary's Park, Cavan
Referee: Jim Giblin (Cavan)

== Semi Final play-offs ==
7 September 2014
1.00pm
Semi Final play-off 1

Arva	2-16 - 1-6	Kildallan

St. Aiden's Park, Cavan
Referee: Jason O'Reilly (Cavan)

14 September 2014
2.30pm
Semi Final play-off 2

Arva	1-15 - 1-8	Templeport

Ballyconnell, Cavan
Referee: Packie Smith (Cavan)

== Semi-final ==
20 September 2014
5.00pm
Semi Final

Ballymachugh	1-12 - 1-9	Shannon Gaels
	Report

Kingspan Breffni Park, Cavan
Referee: Kieran McCarville (Cavan)

20 September 2014
6.30pm
Semi Final

Arva	2-11 - 2-10	Cornafean Gaels
	Report

Kingspan Breffni Park, Cavan
Referee: Michael Lee (Cavan)

== Final ==
5 October 2014
4.00pm
Final

Arva	2-11 - 0-8	Ballymachugh

Kingspan Breffni Park, Cavan
Referee: Ollie Donohoe (Cavan)
