= 2013 Cavan Junior Football Championship =

Cavan J.F.C.
- Season: 2013
- Champions: Kill (3rd Title)
- Relegated: N/A
- Ulster JCFC: Kill
- All Ireland ICFC: N/A
- Matches: 17

The Cavan Junior Football Championship is an annual Gaelic Athletic Association club competition between the third-tier Cavan Gaelic football clubs. It was first competed for in 1913. The winner qualifies to represent their county in the Ulster Club Championship and in turn, go on to the All-Ireland Junior Club Football Championship. The current champions are Laragh United, who defeated Mountnugent in the 2012 decider on a scoreline of 0–10 to 2–03.

== Format ==
10 teams will contest the Hotel Kilmore Junior Championship in 2013.

Teams have been drawn into 3 groups, one 4 team (Group 1) and two 3 teams, (Group 2 & 3). The group stages will be played on a league basis. Where teams finish on equal points group placings will be decided in accordance with rule 6.20 of the GAA Official Guide 2013.

The top team in each group will qualify for the semi-finals. The runner up in group 2 and 3 will play off (Round 4(a)), with the winner qualifying to play in a further play off against the runner up in group 1 (Round 4(b)). The winner of this play off will qualify for the semi-final.

Semi-final pairings will be based on an open draw.

== 2013 Championship ==
=== Group A ===
Group Winner Play-off Qualifier

Team	Pld	W	D	L	F	A	Diff	Pts
Arva (Q)	3	3	0	0	82	27	55	6
Kildallan (Q)	3	1	1	1	45	44	1	3
Corlough	3	1	1	1	46	70	−24	3
MagheraMcFinns	3	0	0	3	33	65	−32	0

2 August 2013
8.00pm
Round 1

Arva	5–20 – 1–4	Corlough

Pairc Padraig Ui Daobhlaion, Cavan
Referee: Packie Smith (Cavan)

2 August 2013
8.00pm
Round 1

Kildallan	1–10 – 0–10	Maghera McFinns

Fay Park, Cavan
Referee: Brian Crowe (Cavan)

11 August 2013
2.00pm
Round 2

Corlough	5–7 – 2–12	Maghera McFinns

P.J. Duke Park, Cavan
Referee: Conor Dourneen (Cavan)

11 August 2013
2.30pm
Round 2

Arva	1–14 – 2–9	Kildallan

Pairc Padraig Ui Daobhlaion, Cavan
Referee: Michael O'Rourke (Cavan)

18 August 2013
2.30pm
Round 3

Arva	3–21 – 0–5	Maghera McFinns

Sheelin Park, Cavan
Referee: Padraig Sheridan (Cavan)

18 August 2013
2.30pm
Round 3

Corlough	3–8 – 3–8	Kildallan

Pairc Gael na Sionnainne, Cavan
Referee: John Cassidy (Cavan)

=== Group B ===
Group Winner Play-off Qualifier

Team	Pld	W	D	L	F	A	Diff	Pts
Kill (Q)	2	2	0	0	33	21	12	4
Templeport (Q)	2	1	0	1	27	27	0	2
Munterconnaught	2	0	0	2	22	34	−12	0

1 August 2013
8.30pm
Round 1

Templeport	1–12 – 1–10	Munterconnaught

Kingspan Breffni Park, Cavan
Referee: Michael Lee (Cavan)

10 August 2013
5.30pm
Round 2

Munterconnaught	0–9 – 2–13	Kill

Hugh O'Reilly Memorial Park, Cavan
Referee: Robbie McDermott (Cavan)

18 August 2013
2.30pm
Round 3

Templeport	1–9 – 1–11	Kill

Max McGrath Memorial Park, Cavan
Referee: Ollie Donohoe (Cavan)

=== Group C ===
Group Winner Play-off Qualifier

Team	Pld	W	D	L	F	A	Diff	Pts
Shannon Gaels (Q)	2	2	0	0	33	21	12	4
Cornafean (Q)	2	1	0	1	27	27	0	2
Knockbride	2	0	0	2	22	34	−12	0

2 August 2013
8.00pm
Round 1

Knockbride	2–8 – 2–18	Cornafean

Our Lady of Lourdes Park, Cavan
Referee: Mg Brady (Cavan)

9 August 2013
8.30pm
Round 2

Shannon Gaels	2–11 – 1–10	Cornafean

St. Aidan's Park, Cavan
Referee: Pat Clarke (Cavan)

17 August 2013
5.30pm
Round 3

Knockbride	0–12 – 2–11	Shannon Gaels

Ballyconnell, Cavan
Referee: Padraig Kellegher (Cavan)

== Semi Final play-offs ==
25 August 2013
6.00pm
Semi Final play-off 1

Templeport	0–13 – 1–12	Cornafean

Kingspan Breffni Park, Cavan
Referee: Harry Conaty (Cavan)

1 September 2013
1.30pm
Semi Final play-off 2

Cornafean	0–14 – 1–7	Kildallan

Pairc Padraig Ui Daobhlaion, Cavan
Referee: Mg brady (Cavan)

== Semi finals ==
Semi-finals		Final
Kill	0–11
Shannon Gaels	0–8	Kill	1–14
Arva	1–17	Arva	1–13
Cornafean	1–10

15 September 2013
2.30pm
Semi Final

Kill	0–11 – 0–8	Shannon Gaels

Kingspan Breffni Park, Cavan
Referee: Pat Clarke, (Cavan)

15 September 2013
4.00pm
Semi Final

Arva	1–17 – 1–10	Cornafean

Kingspan Breffni Park, Cavan
Referee: Martin Sexton, (Cavan)

== Final ==
6 October 2013
4.00pm
Final

Kill	1–14 – 1–13	Arva

Kingspan Breffni Park, Cavan
Referee: Tony Gregory, (Cavan)
