= Cavan Senior Hurling Championship =

Annual competition in Ireland

- Code: Hurling
- Founded: 1908
- Region: Cavan (GAA)
- Trophy: Tom Walsh Memorial Cup
- No. of teams: 3
- Title holders: Cootehill Celtic (10th title)
- First winner: Belturbet
- Most titles: Mullahoran (26 titles)
- Sponsors: Gilsenan Floors and Doors
- Official website: http://www.cavangaa.ie

The Cavan Senior Hurling Championship is an annual Gaelic Athletic Association competition between the top hurling clubs in Cavan. The winners of the Cavan Championship qualify to represent their county in the Ulster Junior Club Hurling, the winners of which go on to the All-Ireland Junior Club Hurling Championship. This championship has never been played on a consistent basis, and has frequently not been completed. Cootehill Celtic are the 2026 title holders, having beaten East Cavan Gaels by 3-23 to 3-08 at Kingspan Breffni Park in August 2026.

== History ==
=== 20th century ===
The first recorded Cavan county championship final was played between Cavan Slashers and Belturbet in 1908. Belturbet reportedly won the game by 2–8 to 1–3. The next recorded county competition was in 1922, and GAA records indicate that Cavan Slashers were 1922 champions. The championship was held inconsistently over the coming decades, until "hurling again vanished from the Cavan G.A.A. scene in 1954". Senior county hurling finals were not held again in Cavan, with any consistency, until the 1980s. The Cavan Senior Hurling Championship has been won once by a club from outside the county - Granard hurling club from County Longford won the title in 1950.

=== 21st century ===
Mullahoran won 21 back-to-back titles in the late 20th and early 21st centuries, until 2011 when that run was ended in a defeat to Ballymachugh in the 2011 final. Cootehill Celtic and Mullahoran were the two main clubs in the competition during the second decade of the 21st century, meeting in the final in 2013, 2015, 2016 and 2017.

In the 2014 competition, Mullahoran (the defending champions) were defeated in the group stage. Cootehill Celtic won the title for only their third time ever and the first time since 1965 following a 5–7 to 1–6 defeat of Ballymachugh in a replay of the final. (Note: Cootehill Celtic captain Aidan Fitzpatrick lined out in his 31st championship campaign. The 47-year-old, who made his club championship debut as a 16-year-old in 1983, later won his first championship medal.)

In 2015, Cootehill Celtic successfully defended their title, becoming champions for the 4th time. On 27 September 2015, in a final held at Kingspan Breffni Park, Mullahoran made a comeback to force a draw and a replay. Cootehill Celtic won the replayed final, held on 30 September 2015, on a scoreline of 0–7 to 0–4.

Cootehill were "fancied to defend" their title in the 2016 final, which was held on 25 September 2016. In the game, Mullahoran St Joseph's beat Cootehill Celtic by 2–7 to 2–6. However, Cootehill were later awarded the title (their 5th title) as Mullahoran were adjudged to have fielded an ineligible player. (Note: While Mullahoran won the 2016 final on the field of play, Cootehill Celtic were awarded the title that year. Cootehill Celtic's 2016 title was subsequently affirmed by reports such as this Irish Independent article on the 2017 final which states that Cootehill Celtic were the defending champions. And further states that the 2017 competition was Mullahoran's "first title in four years". And also this Hoganstand.com article on the 2017 which describes Cootehill as the (2016) "holders".)

The 2020 championship was held in September 2020, involving four teams representing Cootehill Celtic GAA, Mullahoran GAA, East Cavan Gaels and Pearse Óg GAA club. Mullahoran won the 2020 final, beating Cootehill Celtic by 2–09 to 1–11. Cootehill Celtic won back-to-back titles in 2021 and 2022.

== Teams ==
The three teams that contested the 2026 championship were:

Club	Location	Championship titles	Last championship title
Cootehill Celtic	Cootehill	10	2026
East Cavan Gaels	Bailieborough, Kingscourt, Shercock, Mullagh, Virginia	1	2024
Mullahoran	Mullahoran	26	2020

== Roll of honour ==
#	Club	Titles	Championship wins
1	Mullahoran	26	1990, 1991, 1992, 1993, 1994, 1995, 1996, 1997, 1998, 1999, 2000, 2001, 2002, 2003, 2004, 2005, 2006, 2007, 2008, 2009, 2010, 2013, 2017, 2018, 2019, 2020
2	Cootehill Celtic	10	1932, 1965, 2014, 2015, 2016, 2021, 2022, 2023, 2025, 2026
3	Cavan Slashers	8	1922, 1924, 1927, 1928, 1933, 1934, 1935, 1936
4	Bailieborough Shamrocks	5	1966, 1976, 1977, 1982, 1984
5	Cavan Gaels	4	1973, 1974, 1983, 1985
5	Ballyhaise	4	1925, 1926, 1947, 1948
7	Woodford Gaels	3	1986, 1987, 1988
8	Belturbet	1	1908
8	Kill	1	1930
8	Granard (Longford)	1	1950
8	Ballymachugh	1	2011
8	East Cavan Gaels	1	2024

== List of finals ==
=== Legend ===
- Gold – Ulster junior club champions
- Silver – Ulster junior club runners-up

=== List of Cavan SHC finals ===
Year	Winners		Runners-up		#
Year	Club	Score	Club	Score	#
2026	Cootehill	3-24	East Cavan Gaels	3-08	
2025	Cootehill	0-17	East Cavan Gaels	0-13	
2024	East Cavan Gaels	0-15	Cootehill	1-09	
2023	Cootehill	2-19	East Cavan Gaels	3-14	
2022	Cootehill	1-16	Mullahoran	0-9	
2021	Cootehill	2-12	Pearse Og	2-11	
2020	Mullahoran	2-09	Cootehill	1-11	
2019	Mullahoran	2-09	Pearse Og	0-12	
2018	Mullahoran	W/O	Pearse Og		
2017	Mullahoran	4-19	Cootehill	0-05	
2016	Mullahoran	2-07	Cootehill	2-06	(Cootehill awarded title)
2015	Cootehill	3-11 (0-07)	Mullahoran	4-08 (0-04)	(Cootehill win replay)
2014	Cootehill	5-07	Ballymachugh	1-06	
2013	Mullahoran	0-13	Cootehill	0-04	
2012	No Championship				
2011	Ballymachugh	4-08	Mullahoran	1-06	
2010	Mullahoran	3-15	Woodford Gaels	0-03	
2009	Mullahoran	2-10	Ballymachugh	2-07	
2008	Mullahoran	4-15	Ballymachugh	0-02	
2007	Mullahoran	2-13	Woodford Gaels	1-05	
2006	Mullahoran		Woodford Gaels		
2005	Mullahoran		Ballymachugh		
2004	Mullahoran		Cavan Gaels		
2003	Mullahoran		Cavan Gaels		
2002	Mullahoran				
2001	Mullahoran				
2000	Mullahoran				
1999	Mullahoran				
1998	Mullahoran				
1997	Mullahoran				
1996	Mullahoran				
1995	Mullahoran				
1994	Mullahoran		Bailieborough Shamrocks		
1993	Mullahoran		Bailieborough Shamrocks		
1992	Mullahoran		Bailieborough Shamrocks		
1991	Mullahoran		Bailieborough Shamrocks		
1990	Mullahoran		Woodford Gaels		
1989	No Championship				
1988	Woodford Gaels				
1987	Woodford Gaels				
1986	Woodford Gaels	6-09	Cavan Gaels	2-07	
1985	Cavan Gaels				
1984	Bailieborough Shamrocks				
1983	Cavan Gaels				
1982	Bailieborough Shamrocks				
1978–1981	No Championship				
1977	Bailieborough Shamrocks				
1976	Bailieborough Shamrocks				
1975	No Championship				
1974	Cavan Gaels		Woodford Gaels		
1973	Cavan Gaels				
1968–1972	No Championship				
1967	Stradone Gaa				
1966	Bailieborough Shamrocks				
1965	Cootehill				
1964	No Championship				
1963	Stradone Gaa				
1951–1962	No Championship				
1950	Granard (Longford)	5-03	Ballyhaise	1-01	(Longford Club)
1949	No Championship				
1948	Ballyhaise				
1947	Ballyhaise				
1937–1946	No Championship				
1936	Cavan Slashers				
1935	Cavan Slashers				
1934	Cavan Slashers				
1933	Cavan Slashers				
1932	Cootehill				
1931	No Championship				
1930	Kill				
1929	No Championship				
1928	Cavan Slashers				
1927	Cavan Slashers				
1926	Ballyhaise				
1925	Ballyhaise				
1924	Cavan Slashers				
1923	No Championship				
1922	Cavan Slashers				
1909–1921	No Championship				
1908	Belturbet		Cavan		

== See also ==
- Cavan Senior Football Championship
