= Swanlinbar GAA =

Gaelic football club in County Cavan, Ireland

Swanlinbar St Marys
- An Muileann Íarainn
- Founded: 1904
- County: Cavan
- Nickname: Swad
- Colours: Blue and White
- Grounds: St Mary's Park, Swanlinbar

Playing kits
Standard colours

Swanlinbar St Mary's is a Gaelic football club based in Swanlinbar, County Cavan, Ireland.

== History ==
The club was founded in 1904. The club won their first championship title in 1985, winning the Cavan Junior Football Championship, winning it again in 1998 and 2006.

After losing the junior final in 2009, Swad came back in 2010 to win the championship for the fourth time. Swanlinbar went on to reach the final of Ulster Junior Club Football Championship, but Corduff won the match by five points. However, Corduff played an ineligible player and after a successful appeal, Swanlinbar were crowned Ulster Junior champions. The club would go on to beat Ballinabrackey in the All-Ireland semi final to qualify for the final of the All-Ireland Junior Club Football Championship. Swanlinbar faced Kerry club St Mary's in the final at Croke Park on 12 February 2011. The match was level at half-time, but St Mary's went on to win the match by 3–13 to 1–5.

== Honours ==
- Ulster Junior Club Football Championship (1): 2010
- Cavan Junior Football Championship (4): 1985, 1998, 2006, 2010

== Notable players ==
- Gearóid McKiernan
- Owen Roe McGovern
