= 2020 Ulster Senior Football Championship =

2020 Ulster SFC
Tournament details
- Province: Ulster
- Year: 2020
- Trophy: Anglo-Celt Cup
- Teams: 9

Winners
- Champions: Cavan (40th win)
- Manager: Mickey Graham
- Captain: Raymond Galligan

Runners-up
- Runners-up: Donegal
- Manager: Declan Bonner
- Captain: Michael Murphy

Other
- Top Scorer: Gearóid McKiernan (0-11); Rian O'Neill (0-11); Donal O'Hare (1-8)

The 2020 Ulster Senior Football Championship is the 132nd installment of the annual Ulster Senior Football Championship organised by Ulster GAA. It is one of the four provincial competitions of the 2020 All-Ireland Senior Football Championship. The winners receive the Anglo-Celt Cup. The draw for the championship was made on 9 October 2019.

The BBC showed six televised games live.

The Athletic Grounds in Armagh hosted the final, as the fixture was behind closed doors.

Donegal were the two-time defending champions, but were beaten by Cavan in a repeat of the previous year's final.

== Teams ==
The Ulster championship is contested by the nine county teams in the province of Ulster.

Team	Colours	Sponsor	Manager	Captain	Most recent success
Team	Colours	Sponsor	Manager	Captain	All-Ireland	Provincial
Antrim	Saffron and white	Fona Cab	Lenny Harbinson	Declan Lynch		1951
Armagh	Orange and white	Simply Fruit	Kieran McGeeney	Rory Grugan	2002	2008
Cavan	Royal blue and white	Kingspan Group	Mickey Graham	Raymond Galligan	1952	1997
Derry	Red and white	H&A Mechanical Services	Rory Gallagher	Enda Lynn	1993	1998
Donegal	Gold and green	KN Group	Declan Bonner	Michael Murphy	2012	2019
Down	Red and black	EOS IT Solutions	Paddy Tally	Darren O'Hagan	1994	1994
Fermanagh	Green and white	Tracey Concrete	Ryan McMenamin	Eoin Donnelly
Monaghan	White and blue	Investec	Séamus "Banty" McEnaney	Ryan Wylie		2015
Tyrone	White and Red	Tyrone Fabrication	Mickey Harte	Mattie Donnelly	2008	2017

== Championship draw ==
Preliminary round
Monaghan	1–17
Cavan	2–15

Quarter-finals
Donegal	1–13
Tyrone	1–11
Derry	0–15
Armagh	0–17
Fermanagh	0–11
Down	1–15
Antrim	0–9
Cavan	0–13

Semi-finals
Donegal	1–22
Armagh	0–13
Down	1–13
Cavan	1–14

Final
Donegal	0–12
Cavan	1–13

== Matches ==
=== Preliminary round ===
Sky Sports Mix

31 October 2020
13:15 GMT (UTC+0)
Preliminary round

Report

Monaghan	1-17 (20) – (21) 2-15 (a.e.t.)	Cavan
(HT: 1–11 – 1-4)
Gls: C McManus 1. Pts: C McManus 4 (2f), M Bannigan 2, K Duffy 1, D Ward 1, F Kelly 1, K Hughes 1, R McAnespie 1, S O’Hanlon 1, C McCarthy 1, A Woods 1, C Walshe 1, S Carey 1 (m), R Beggan 1 (f).		Gls: M Reilly 1, O Pierson 1. Pts: G McKiernan 3, S Smith 2, L Fortune 2, G Smith 1, J Smith 1, M Reilly 1, O Kiernan 1, T Galligan 1, N Murray 1 (1m), C Conroy 1 (1 ‘45), R Galligan 1 (f).

St Tiernach's Park, Clones
Referee: Ciaran Branagan (Down)
Attendance: 0 (Note: The game was played behind closed doors due to the impact of the COVID-19 pandemic on Gaelic games.)

=== Quarter-finals ===
RTÉ, BBC NI

1 November 2020
13:30 GMT (UTC+0)
Quarter-final

Report

Donegal	1-13 (16) – (14) 1-11	Tyrone
(HT: 1-5 – 0-6)
Gls: M Langan 1. Pts: C Thompson 7 (5fs), M Langan 2, J Brennan 2, O Gallen 1, P Brennan 1.		Gls: D Canavan 1. Pts: D McCurry 3 (1f), M Bradley 2, M Donnelly 1, C McKenna 1 (f), P Harte 1, F Burns 1, N Morgan 1 (45), D Canavan 1.

MacCumhaill Park, Ballybofey
Referee: Joe McQuillan (Cavan)
Attendance: 0

BBC NI

1 November 2020
16:00 GMT (UTC+0)
Quarter-final

Report

Derry	0-15 (15) – (17) 0-17	Armagh
(HT: 0-5 – 0–11)
Pts: S McGuigan 7 (7f); N Loughlin 4 (3f); E Doherty 1, C McFaul 1, P Kearney 1, C McKaigue 1.		Pts: R O'Neill 4 (4f); R Grugan 3 (1f), J Clarke 3; A Forker 2, O O'Neill 2; C O'Neill 1, M Shields 1, J Óg Burns 1

Celtic Park, Derry
Referee: Sean Hurson (Tyrone)
Attendance: 0

BBC NI

7 November 2020
13:15 GMT (UTC+0)
Quarter-final

Report

Antrim	0-9 (09) – (13) 0-13	Cavan
(HT: 0-6 – 0-5)
Pts: P Cunningham 2 (1f), C Murray 2 (1m); M McCann 1, K Quinn 1, D McAleese 1, P McBride 1 (f), T McCann 1 (f).		Pts: G McKiernan 3 (1f), TE Donoghue 3 (1m 1f); C Brady 2, O Kiernan 2; K Clarke 1, C Timoney 1, O Pierson 1

Kingspan Breffni Park, Cavan
Referee: Paul Faloon (Down)
Attendance: 0

RTÉ, BBC NI

8 November 2020
13:30 GMT (UTC+0)
Quarter-final

Report

Fermanagh	0-11 (11) – (18) 1-15	Down
(HT: 0-6 – 0-7)
Pts: T Corrigan 6 (4f, 1m), C Corrigan 1, D McGurn 1, C Jones 1, D Teague 1, P McCusker 1.		Gls: D O'Hare 1 Pts: D O'Hare 4 (3f), B O'Hagan 4, J Johnston 2, C Mooney 2, R Johnston 2, C Quinn 1

Brewster Park, Enniskillen
Referee: Barry Cassidy (Derry)
Attendance: 0

=== Semi-finals ===
Sky Sports Mix

14 November 2020
13:15 GMT (UTC+0)
Semi-final

Report

Donegal	1-22 (25) – (13) 0-13	Armagh
(HT: 1-12 – 0-3)
Gls: P Mogan 1. Pts: M Langan 3, P Mogan 2, R McHugh 2, J Brennan 2, C McGonigle 2 (1m), C Thompson 2 (1f), N O’Donnell 2 (1m), M Murphy 2 (2f), EB Gallagher 1, H McFadden 1 (m), P McBrearty 1, O Gallen 1, A McClean 1		Pts: R O’Neill 7 (6f, 1x’45′), J Clarke 2, C Turbitt 2 (1m), O O’Neil 1, N Grimley 1 (1m).

Breffni Park, Cavan
Referee: David Coldrick (Meath)
Attendance: 0

BBC NI

15 November 2020
13:30 GMT (UTC+0)
Semi-final

Report

Down	1-13 (16) – (17) 1-14	Cavan
(HT: 1-9 – 0-4)
Gls: C Doherty 1. Pts: J Johnston 6 (1m), D O’Hare 4 (3f), P Devlin 2 (1x’45′).		Gls: M Reilly 1 (pen). Pts: G McKiernan 3 (3f), T Galligan 3 (1m), C Madden 3, K Brady 2, P Faulkner 1, C Brady 1, S Smith 1 (f).

Athletic Grounds, Armagh
Referee: Martin McNally (Monaghan)
Attendance: 0

=== Final ===
RTÉ
BBC NI

22 November 2020
16:00 GMT (UTC+0)

Report

Donegal	0-12 (12) – (16) 1-13	Cavan
(HT: 0-9 - 0-7)
Pts: P McBrearty 4 (2f), N O’Donnell 2, C McGonigle 2, R McHugh 1, P Mogan 1, M Langan 1, M Murphy 1.		Gls: C Madden 1. Pts: C Madden 2, J Smith 2, O Kiernan 2, G McKiernan 2 (2f), J McLoughlin 1, G Smith 1, C Brady 1, T Galligan 1, M Reilly 1.

Athletic Grounds, Armagh
Referee: Barry Cassidy (Derry)
Attendance: 0

== See also ==
- 2020 All-Ireland Senior Football Championship
  - 2020 Connacht Senior Football Championship
  - 2020 Leinster Senior Football Championship
  - 2020 Munster Senior Football Championship
