= Cavan Junior Football Championship =

Annual Gaelic football competition

- Code: Gaelic football
- Founded: 1913
- Region: Cavan, Ireland (GAA)
- Trophy: Seán Leddy Cup
- No. of teams: 12
- Title holders: Lacken (1st title)
- Most titles: Templeport (7 titles)
- Sponsors: Rudden's Service Station
- Official website: http://www.cavangaa.ie

The Cavan Junior Football Championship is an annual Gaelic football competition organised by Cavan GAA. It is played between the twelve lowest-graded clubs in County Cavan. It was first competed for in 1913. The winners are awarded the Seán Leddy Cup and go on to represent Cavan in the Ulster Junior Club Football Championship. The winners are also promoted to the Cavan Intermediate Football Championship for the following year.

Templeport are the most successful club in the competition with seven wins. The current champions are Lacken who beat Templeport in the 2026 final to win the title for the first time.

== Format ==
12 teams contest the Rudden's Service Station Junior Football Championship. The championship is run on a league basis up to the quarter-final stage and knock-out thereafter. Each team plays 4 rounds in the league phase with the fixtures decided by a random draw at the conclusion of each round. No team can meet each other twice in the group stage. The top 8 teams in the league progress to the quarter-finals while the bottom 4 placed teams enter the Shield competition. The winner is promoted to the Cavan Intermediate Football Championship.

== List of finals ==
Key to list of winners
†	Winning team reached the final of the Ulster Junior Club Football Championship
‡	Winning team won the Ulster Junior Club Football Championship
#	Winning team won the All-Ireland Junior Club Football Championship

List of Cavan Junior Football Championship finals
Year	Winners	Score	Opponent	Ref.
1913	Ballinagh			
1914	Cornafean			
1915	Cavan Slashers			
1916	Gowna			
1917	Loughduff Volunteers			
1918	Drumbo			
1919	Bailieborough Shamrocks		Butlersbridge	
1920	Bruskey			
1921	Ballymachugh			
1922	Templeport			
1923	Templeport	2–2 – 0–4	Crosserlough	
1924	Tullyco	3–4 – 2–1	Crosskeys	
1925	Lurgan	1–4 – 0–0	Belturbet	
1926	Cavan Harps	5–10 – 0–1	Drumgoon	
1927	Cornafean	1–3 – 0–4	Munterconnaught	
1928	Munterconnaught	0–1 – 0–1	Lacken	
1928	Munterconnaught	3–3 – 1–3 (R)	Lacken	
1929	Camagh	3–5 – 2–0	Ballymachugh	
1930	Templeport	3–2 – 1–3	Lacken	
1931	Kingscourt Stars	1–2 – 1–1	Ballymachugh	
1932	Mullahoran			
1933	Arva	1–7 – 0–5	Crosserlough	
1934	Gowna	3–6 – 0–4	Stradone	
1935	Croghan	0–11 – 0–1	Crubany	
1936	Ballyjamesduff	1–5 – 2–1	Drumlane	
1937	Belturbet	2–5 – 0–5	Mountnugent	
1938	Cavan Slashers	2–4 – 0–4	Munterconnaught	
1939	Croghan	1–7 – 2–4	Crubany	
1939	Croghan	4–5 – 2–5 (R)	Crubany	
1940	Mullahoran	2–7 – 1–4	Castlerahan	
1941	Cross	0–5 – 0–2	Kilnaleck	
1942	Templeport	0–8 – 1–4	Castlerahan	
1943	Mountnugent	3–4 – 0–7	Crubany	
1944	Stradone	5–4 – 0–3	Kill	
1945	Annagh	2–3 – 2–2	Munterconnaught	
1946	Cross	1–8 – 0–4	Drung	
1947	Drung	1–9 – 2–2	Kingscourt Stars	
1948	Drumlane			
1949	Munterconnaught	3–2 – 0–4	Annagh	
1950	Lavey			
1951	Castlerahan			
1952	Cootehill	1–10 – 0–4	Butlersbridge	
1953	Ballinagh	1–7 – 1–5	Kingscourt Stars	
1954	Kingscourt Stars	1–8 – 1–1	Cavan Harps	
1955	Mullagh	3–7 – 0–4	Lavey	
1956	Killinkere	3–12 – 0–3	Virginia Blues	
1957	Cormore	4–3 – 1–8	Belturbet	
1958	Virginia Blues	2–3 – 1–3	Ballinagh	
1959	Castlerahan	3–6 – 2–2	Drumlane	
1960	Cootehill	2–8 – 1–5	Cross	
1961	Kingscourt Stars	1–8 – 2–5	Mullahoran	
1961	Kingscourt Stars	1–7 – 0–8 (R)	Mullahoran	
1962	Cross	0–9 – 1–5	Mountnugent	
1963	Butlersbridge	3–5 – 0–8	Killinkere	
1964	Mountnugent	0–8 – 0–3	Killinkere	
1965	Castlerahan	2–10 – 0–8	Killinkere	
1966	Virginia Blues	1–4 – 0–7	Redhills	
1966	Virginia Blues	2–9 – 0–5 (R)	Redhills	
1967	Crosserlough	3–8 – 3–6	Belturbet	
1968	Templeport	0–8 – 2–2	Cavan Gaels	
1968	Templeport	2–4 – 1–3 (R)	Cavan Gaels	
1969	Cootehill	0–10 – 1–4	Butlersbridge	
1970	Killeshandra	4–7 – 0–7	Butlersbridge	
1971	Drumlane	3–8 – 2–7	Killinkere	
1972	Killinkere	1–10 – 2–5	Munterconnaught	
1973	Maghera MacFinns	3–11 – 0–6	Crosserlough	
1974	Butlersbridge	2–4 – 0–4	Mullahoran	
1975	Lavey	2–8 – 0–4	Munterconnaught	
1976	Munterconnaught	1–9 – 1–8	Ballinagh	
1977	Kildallan	0–9 – 1–5	Ballinagh	
1978	Ballinagh	2–7 – 0–3	Belturbet	
1979	Shercock	1–13 – 1–4	Knockbride	
1980	Drung	1–10 – 0–11	Maghera MacFinns	
1981	Knockbride	1–10 – 0–6	Gowna	
1982	Gowna	1–11 – 0–10	Corlough	
1983	Killeshandra	1–12 – 0–7	Kill	
1984	Denn	2–9 – 1–1	Mountnugent	
1985	Swanlinbar	1–3 – 0–3	Belturbet	
1986	Kill	1–9 – 1–5	Drumlane	
1987	Castlerahan	1–8 – 0–7	Killygarry	
1988	Mountnugent	3–4 – 0–8	Belturbet	
1989	Shannon Gaels	1–9 – 0–7	Shercock	
1990	Killygarry	0–13 – 1–8	Kildallan	
1991	Castlerahan	0–12 – 2–5	Killinkere	
1992	Mountnugent	3–3 – 0–9	Knockbride	
1993	Arva	2–12 – 1–3	Knockbride	
1994	Munterconnaught	0–11 – 0–7	Belturbet	
1995	Belturbet	2–9 – 0–12	Knockbride	
1996	Knockbride		Swanlinbar	
1997	Kill	2–10 – 2–9	Shercock	
1998	Swanlinbar	0–21 – 0–7	Mullahoran	
1999	Drumlane	2–7 – 0–9	Butlersbridge	
2000	Cornafean	1–12 – 0–13	Drumgoon	
2001	Drumgoon #	1–10 – 0–7	Kildallan	
2002	Butlersbridge	1–6 – 0–6	Kildallan	
2003	Lavey	0–12 – 0–6	Mountnugent	
2004	Butlersbridge	0–9 – 1–6	Redhills	
2004	Butlersbridge	0–14 – 1–6 (R)	Redhills	
2005	Redhills	2–8 – 1–10	Shannon Gaels	
2006	Swanlinbar	1–14 – 1–14	Munterconnaught	
2006	Swanlinbar	0–18 – 0–9 (R)	Munterconnaught	
2007	Killeshandra	0–11 – 0–8	Shannon Gaels	
2008	Drung	1–12 – 0–8	Mountnugent	
2009	Butlersbridge	4–8 – 0–11	Swanlinbar	
2010	Swanlinbar ‡	0–16 – 1–8	Munterconnaught	
2011	Shercock	1–10 – 1–7	Munterconnaught	
2012	Laragh United	0–10 – 2–3	Mountnugent	
2013	Kill	1–14 – 1–13	Arva	
2014	Arva	2–11 – 0–8	Ballymachugh	
2015	Templeport	1–16 – 1–12	Cornafean	
2016	Cornafean	1–16 – 0–11	Ballymachugh	
2017	Ballymachugh	2–11 – 0–13	Drumalee	
2018	Drumlane	0–7 – 0–7	Killinkere	
2018	Drumlane	2–12 – 0–13 (R)	Killinkere	
2019	Killinkere	2–16 – 3–8	Shannon Gaels	
2020	Templeport	2–11 – 1–10	Denn	
2021	Denn ‡	2–11 – 1–7	Drung	
2022	Drumlane †	1–12 – 2–8	Arva	
2023	Arva #	2–11 – 0–9	Knockbride	
2024	Knockbride	0–15 – 0–11	Belturbet	
2025	Munterconnaught	0–11 – 0–10	Kill	
2026	Lacken	2–19 – 1–11	Templeport	

== Performances by club ==
Performances in the Cavan Junior Football Championship by club
Club	Titles	Years won
Templeport	7	1922, 1923, 1930, 1942, 1968, 2015, 2020
Drumlane	5	1948, 1971, 1999, 2018, 2022
Castlerahan	5	1951, 1959, 1965, 1987, 1991
Butlersbridge	5	1963, 1974, 2002, 2004, 2009
Munterconnaught	5	1928, 1949, 1976, 1994, 2025
Cornafean	4	1914, 1927, 2000, 2016
Arva	4	1933, 1993, 2014, 2023
Mountnugent	4	1943, 1964, 1988, 1992
Swanlinbar	4	1985, 1998, 2006, 2010
Ballinagh	3	1913, 1953, 1978
Gowna	3	1916, 1934, 1982
Kingscourt Stars	3	1931, 1954, 1961
Cross	3	1941, 1946, 1962
Drung	3	1947, 1980, 2008
Lavey	3	1950, 1975, 2003
Cootehill	3	1952, 1960, 1969
Killinkere	3	1956, 1972, 2019
Kill	3	1986, 1997, 2013
Killeshandra	3	1970, 1983, 2007
Knockbride	3	1981, 1996, 2024
Cavan Slashers	2	1915, 1938
Ballymachugh	2	1921, 2017
Mullahoran	2	1932, 1940
Croghan	2	1935, 1939
Belturbet	2	1937, 1995
Virginia	2	1958, 1966
Shercock	2	1979, 2011
Denn	2	1984, 2021
Loughduff Volunteers	1	1917
Drumbo	1	1918
Bailieborough Shamrocks	1	1919
Bruskey	1	1920
Tullyco	1	1924
Lurgan	1	1925
Cavan Harps	1	1926
Camagh	1	1929
Ballyjamesduff	1	1936
Stradone	1	1944
Annagh	1	1945
Mullagh	1	1955
Cormore	1	1957
Maghera	1	1973
Crosserlough	1	1967
Kildallan	1	1977
Shannon Gaels	1	1989
Killygarry	1	1990
Drumgoon	1	2001
Redhills	1	2005
Laragh United	1	2012
Lacken	1	2026
