= East Cavan Gaels GAA =

East Cavan Gaels
- Gaeil Thoir an Chabháin
- Founded: 2009
- County: Cavan
- Nickname: The Gaels
- Colours: Blue and navy
- Grounds: St Anne's Park, Bailieborough
- Coordinates: 53°55′33″N 6°58′07″W

Playing kits
Standard colours

Senior Club Championships
	All Ireland	Ulster champions	Cavan champions
Hurling:	0	0	1

East Cavan Gaels GAA is a Gaelic Athletic Association club located in East Cavan, Ireland. The club is primarily concerned with the game of hurling.

== History ==
Located in the Bailieborough, Kingscourt, Shercock, Mullagh and Virginia areas in the eastern part of the county, East Cavan Gaels GAA Club was founded in 2009. Using a regional model devised by the club, it was established to promote and develop the game of hurling in an area where Gaelic football had been dominant. East Cavan Gaels currently participate in the Cavan SHC. They won their first Cavan SHC title in 2024 after a 0-15 to 1-09 defeat of Cootehill in the final.

== Honours ==
- Cavan Senior Hurling Championship (1): 2024
- Cavan Under-15 Hurling League Shield (1): 2018

== Notable players ==
- Canice Maher: All-Ireland MHC-winner (2008)
- Nicky Kenny: Leinster Minor Hurling Championship-winner (2004) & 2 All-Ireland Senior Club Hurling Championship-winner with Dublin club Cuala.
