= Templeport GAA =

Irish football club

Templeport St Aidan's GAA
- Teampall An Phoirt
- Founded: 1910
- County: Cavan
- Colours: Green and Gold
- Grounds: St Aidan's Park, Bawnboy

Playing kits
Standard colours

Senior Club Championships
	All Ireland	Ulster champions	Cavan champions
Football:	0	0	1

Templeport St Aidan's is a Gaelic football club based in Bawnboy, County Cavan, Ireland.

== History ==
The current Templeport St Aidan's club was founded on 11 December 1910. The club won the Cavan Senior Football Championship in 1923; it remains their only senior title. They have won the Cavan Intermediate Football Championship four times, most recently in 1995. The club won the junior championship for the sixth time in 2015 and won it again in 2020 (the final was played in 2021).

The club's current pitch was opened in 2005.

== Honours ==
- Cavan Senior Football Championship (1): 1923
- Cavan Intermediate Football Championship (4): 1923, 1924, 1977, 1995
- Cavan Junior Football Championship (7): 1922, 1923, 1930, 1942, 1968, 2015, 2020
