= Arva GAA =

Cavan-based Gaelic games club

Arva St Patrick's
- Naomh Pádraig Ármhach
- Founded: 1888
- County: Cavan
- Colours: Blue and White
- Grounds: Michael Cully Park
- Coordinates: 53°55′19″N 7°34′41″W

Playing kits
Standard colours

Arva St Patrick's is a Gaelic football club based in Arvagh, County Cavan, Ireland.

== History ==
The Arva Davitt's club was founded in 1888. The club's first championship success came in 1933, winning the Cavan Junior Football Championship. The Davitt's club and the neighbouring Cormore club joined in 1964 to form the Arva St Patrick's club, and went on to win the Cavan Intermediate Football Championship in 1972. The club added a further title at intermediate level in 1983 and the Junior Championship in 1993.

A young Arva team reached the final of the Junior Championship in 2013, losing by a point to Kill. They were in the final again in 2014, beating Ballymachugh to win their first championship in 21 years. Arva reached the Intermediate final in their first year in 2015, losing to Ballyhaise. The club made it to a championship final for the fourth consecutive year in 2016, winning the Intermediate title after a replay against Killinkere.

Arva were back at junior level in 2022, reaching the final against Drumlane. Arva lost the final by a point, but came back the next year to win the championship by beating Knockbride in the decider. Arva went on to beat Ballymaguigan in the quarter-final and Lisnaskea in the semi-final to qualify for the final of the Ulster Junior Club Football Championship. Arva won the championship with a 0–13 to 0–6 win over Blackhill. Arva went on to reach the final of the All-Ireland Junior Club Football Championship with a twelve-point semi-final win over Milltown. The final took place on 14 January 2024 in Croke Park against Listowel Emmets. Arva trailed by three points at half-time, but a strong second half performance helped Arva to a 0–13 to 0–10 win.

Arva secured back-to-back county titles by beating Butlersbridge in the 2024 Intermediate final. Arva qualified for the final of the Ulster Intermediate Club Football Championship with a six-point victory over Drumgath in the quarter-final, and a late comeback win against Magheracloone in the semi-final, extending their run to 23 championship matches unbeaten. Arva lost the final by a point to Ballinderry.

== Honours ==
- Cavan Intermediate Football Championship: 4
  - 1972, 1983, 2016, 2024
- All-Ireland Junior Club Football Championship: 1
  - 2023–24
- Ulster Junior Club Football Championship: 1
  - 2023
- Cavan Junior Football Championship: 4
  - 1933, 1993, 2014, 2023
- Cavan Minor Football Championship: 2
  - 1935, 1939
