= Mullahoran GAA =

Cavan-based Gaelic games club

Mullahoran
- Mullach Fhuaráin
- Founded: 1888
- County: Cavan
- Nickname: The Dreadnoughts
- Colours: Blue and Gold
- Grounds: Our Lady of Lourdes Park, Mullahoran
- Coordinates: 53°57′54.0951″N 7°19′5.1462″W

Playing kits
Standard colours

Senior Club Championships
	All Ireland	Ulster champions	Cavan champions
Football:	0	0	12
Hurling:	0	0	26
Ladies' football:	1	7	7

Mullahoran GAA is a Gaelic games club from County Cavan in Ireland. Founded in 1888, it is affiliated to Cavan GAA. The club's nickname is the Dreadnoughts. It is a rural club located in the parish of Mullahoran in south Cavan, approximately 10 miles from Cavan town. Gaelic football, rounders, hurling and handball are played at the club and numerous county and national honours have been won in the past in these codes.

== Gaelic football ==
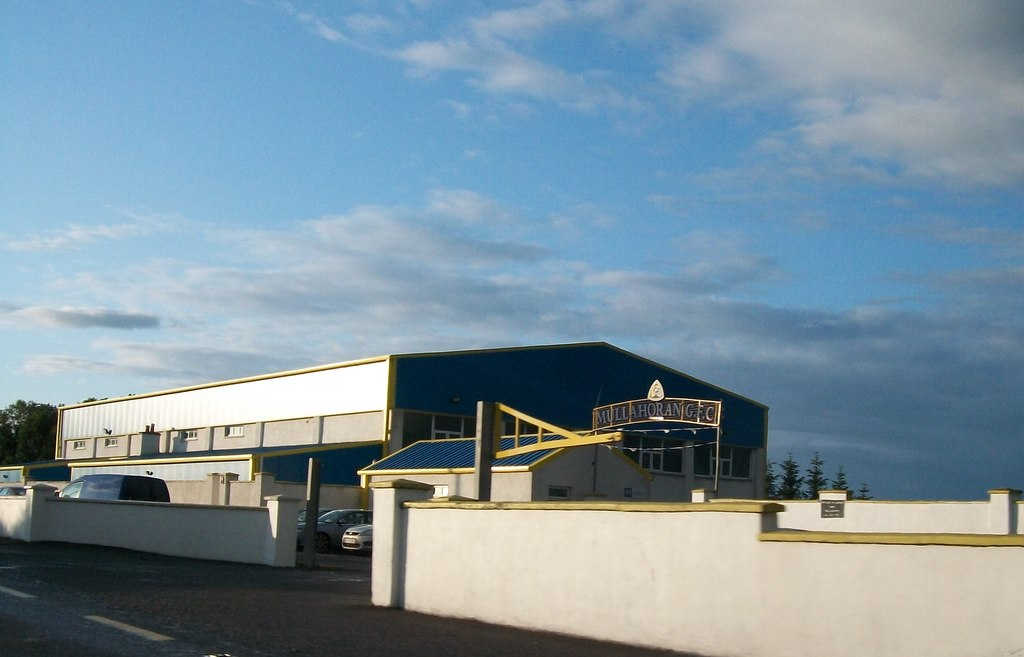
Our Lady of Lourdes Park in 2011

Mullahoran have the third-best record in the Cavan Championship with 12 wins, the first being in 1935 and the most recent in 2012. The club also won the league in 2012 to record a rare double. They played in the Ulster Club Championship in 2012 and in 2006. In the 2006 competition, they lost to eventual All-Ireland champions Crossmaglen Rangers in the first round.

=== Honours ===
- Cavan Senior Football Championship (12): 1935, 1942, 1944, 1945, 1947, 1948, 1949, 1950, 1963, 1998, 2006, 2012
- Cavan Intermediate Football Championship (2): 1978, 2018
- Cavan Junior Football Championship (2): 1932, 1940
- Cavan Minor Football Championship (2): 1992, 1993
- Cavan Under-21 Football Championship (3): 1990, 1998, 1999

=== Notable players ===
Mullahoran players who have been recently selected for the Cavan senior team include Killian Brady, Cormac O'Reilly, and Cormac McKeogh. Notable Mullahoran players of past Cavan teams include world handball champion Paul Brady, Damien O'Reilly, Phil 'The Gunner' Brady, Val Gannon, and former Tánaiste John Wilson. Cavan football from the 1930s through to the 1950s relied heavily on Mullahoran and Cornafean players.

== Hurling ==
The parish also has a separate hurling team known as Mullahoran St Joseph's, who are the Cavan Senior Hurling Champions as of 2020. The club had been unbeaten in the Cavan Senior Hurling Championship since 1990 until surrendering the title to Ballymachugh in 2011. The club's run of 21 consecutive Championship titles is a record in the GAA. The club also appeared in the Division 3 Ulster Senior Hurling League in 2006, but lost to Bredagh from Down. In 2020, Mullahoran won a 4 in a row to gain their 26th Cavan title. Mullahoran's U-14 hurlers also won the All-Ireland Féile in 2003, becoming one of the first Cavan teams to win a national hurling honour.

=== Honours ===
- Cavan Senior Hurling Championship (26): 1990, 1991, 1992, 1993, 1994, 1995, 1996, 1997, 1998, 1999, 2000, 2001, 2002, 2003, 2004, 2005, 2006, 2007, 2008, 2009, 2010, 2013, 2017, 2018, 2019, 2020

== Rounders ==
The Erne Eagles Rounders club has been active in the area since 1984/5. The club is one of the most successful in the country. Along with numerous silver and bronze medals at the Community Games National Finals, a number of the senior men's and women's team members have been recognised with All-Star awards at national level. The Senior Mens team and the most successful in GAA Rounders, with 14 titles, after regaining the title in 2021 to make it 3 titles out of the last 4, while the Senior Mixed team added the Double by winning the 2021 Senior Mixed All Ireland Title

=== Honours ===
The club includes the following in their list of honours:

- All Ireland Men's Senior Champions 1998-2007, 2009, 2018-2019, 2021, 2022
- All Ireland Women's Senior Champions 2007, 2012
- All Ireland Senior Mixed Champions 2003, 2005, 2020-2021
- All Ireland Minor Men's Champions 1986, 1997, 2006–2007
- National League Winners 2002
- Minor Mixed All Ireland Champions 2001
- Gary Kelly Cup (Senior Ladies) Winners 1998 - 2000
- U14 Mixed Féile Winners 1998 - 2000

== Ladies' Gaelic football ==
Mullahoran Ladies won the inaugural Ladies All-Ireland Club Championship in 1977. The team beat St Comans of Roscommon to win the Dolores Tyrrell Memorial Cup.
