= Cootehill Celtic GAA =

Cavan-based Gaelic games club

Cootehill Celtic
- Ceiltigh na Mhuinchille
- Founded: 1894
- County: Cavan
- Nickname: The Celtics
- Colours: Green and White
- Grounds: Hugh O'Reilly Memorial Park, Cootehill

Playing kits
Standard colours

Senior Club Championships
| | All Ireland | Ulster champions | Cavan champions |
|---|---|---|---|
| Football: | 0 | 0 | 3 |
| Hurling: | 0 | 0 | 10 |

Cootehill Celtic is a Gaelic games club from County Cavan in Ireland. It is affiliated to Cavan GAA. It fields teams at various age groups in both Gaelic football and hurling and is the only dual club in County Cavan. The club has is also registered with the LGFA and has girls from teams U-8 to U-14.

== History ==
The club was founded in 1894 by a number of emigrants who returned from Scotland to their home town of Cootehill upon their retirement. They named the club Cootehill Celtic after Glasgow Celtic FC. Both clubs wear the same colours and fly the tricolour at home games.

== Kit ==
Traditionally Cootehill Celtic have always worn green and white hooped jerseys.

== Honours ==
- Cavan Senior Football Championship (3): 1953, 1954, 1955
- Cavan Senior Hurling Championship (10): 1932, 1965, 2014, 2015, 2016, 2021, 2022, 2023, 2025, 2026
- Cavan Intermediate Football Championship (2): 1971, 2014
- Cavan Junior Football Championship (3): 1952, 1960, 1969
- Cavan Minor Football Championship (1): 1959, 1969
