= 2026 Cavan Senior Football Championship =

2026 Gaelic football tournament

2026 Kyte Powertech Cavan Senior Football Championship
Tournament details
- County: Cavan
- Province: Ulster
- Year: 2026
- Trophy: Oliver Plunkett Cup
- Sponsor: Kyte Powertech
- Date: 6 August – October 2026
- Teams: 12
- Defending champions: Kingscourt Stars

Winners
- Champions: Gowna (10th win)
- Manager: Vinny Corey
- Captain: Conor Brady
- Qualify for: Ulster Club SFC

Runners-up
- Runners-up: Kingscourt Stars
- Manager: Colin Kelly
- Captain: Barry Tully

Promotion/Relegation
- Relegated team(s): Laragh United

The 2026 Cavan Senior Football Championship is the 117th edition of Cavan GAA's premier Gaelic football tournament for senior graded clubs in County Cavan, Ireland. The tournament consists of 12 teams, with the winners being awarded the Oliver Plunkett Cup and going on to represent Cavan in the Ulster Senior Club Football Championship. The championship began on 6 August 2026.

Kingscourt Stars are the defending champions after winning their first senior title since 2015.

== Team changes ==
The following teams changed division since the 2025 championship season.

=== To championship ===
Promoted from 2025 Cavan Intermediate Football Championship

- Cúchulainns (Intermediate Champions)

=== From championship ===
Relegated to 2026 Cavan Intermediate Football Championship

- Ballinagh (Relegation play-off losers)

== Participating teams ==
The clubs participating in the 2026 Cavan S.F.C. are:

Club	Location	Manager(s)	2025 Championship Position	2026 Championship Position	Championship Titles	Last Championship Title
Arva	Arvagh		Quarter-Finalist	Relegation Semi-Finalist	0	—
Ballyhaise	Ballyhaise		Quarter-Finalist	Relegation Semi-Finalist	0	—
Castlerahan	Ballyjamesduff		Relegation Semi-Finalist	Relegation Finalist	2	2019
Cavan Gaels	Cavan		Quarter-Finalist	Quarter-Finalist	14	2017
Crosserlough	Kilnaleck		Semi-Finalist	Semi-Finalist	11	2024
Cúchulainns	Mullagh		I.F.C. Champions	Semi-Finalist	0	—
Gowna	Loch Gowna		Runners-Up	Champions	9	2023
Killygarry	Killygarry		Relegation Semi-Finalist	Quarter-Finalist	0	—
Kingscourt Stars	Kingscourt		Champions	Runners-Up	12	2025
Laragh United	Laragh & Stradone		Relegation Finalist	Relegated to Intermediate	4	1984
Mullahoran	Mullahoran		Quarter-Finalist	Quarter-Finalist	12	2012
Ramor United	Virginia		Semi-Finalist	Quarter-Finalist	5	2021

== League Phase ==
All 12 teams enter the competition at this stage and are put into one league table. Each team plays four games with the fixtures decided by a random draw at the conclusion of each round. No team can meet each other twice in the league stage. The top eight teams in the league progress to the quarter-finals while the bottom four teams enter the relegation play-offs.

Advance to quarter-final Advance to relegation playoffs

Pos	Team	Pld	W	D	L	F	A	Diff	Pts
1	Gowna	4	3	1	0	80	55	+25	7
2	Crosserlough	4	3	0	1	106	79	+27	5
3	Killygarry	4	3	0	1	88	68	+20	5
4	Kingscourt Stars	4	3	0	1	81	70	+11	6
5	Cavan Gaels	4	2	0	2	80	66	+14	4
6	Cúchulainns	4	2	0	2	69	68	+1	4
7	Ramor United	4	2	0	2	79	80	-1	4
8	Mullahoran	4	2	0	2	61	70	-9	4
9	Ballyhaise	4	1	1	2	89	88	+1	3
10	Arva	4	1	0	3	81	84	-3	2
11	Castlerahan	4	1	0	3	70	91	-21	2
12	Laragh United	4	0	0	4	54	119	-65	0

=== Round 1 ===
6 August 2026 Round 1	Kingscourt Stars	1-13 (16) – (14) 0-14	Ramor United	Cavan
20:00 IST (UTC+1)		(HT: 0-08 – 0-07)		Venue: Breffni Park
		Report

7 August 2026 Round 1	Mullahoran	0-17 (17) – (12) 0-12	Cavan Gaels	Cavan
20:00 IST (UTC+1)				Venue: Breffni Park
		Report

8 August 2026 Round 1	Cuchúlainns	1-21 (24) – (17) 1-14	Laragh United	Cavan
18:30 IST (UTC+1)				Venue: Breffni Park
		Report

8 August 2026 Round 1	Killygarry	1-17 (20) – (17) 2-11	Castlerahan	Cavan
20:00 IST (UTC+1)				Venue: Breffni Park
		Report

9 August 2026 Round 1	Gowna	3-11 (20) – (20) 2-14	Ballyhaise	Cavan
17:30 IST (UTC+1)		(HT: 3-07 – 0-09)		Venue: Breffni Park
	Pts: Fiachra Brady 1-2, Tiarnan Madden 1-1, Oisín Pierson 1-0, Seanie Hartin 0-3, Robbie Fitzpatrick 0-2 (1f), Ryan Brady 0-1, Daire Madden 0-1, Ryan Donohoe 0-1	Report	Pts: Padraig Moore 1-1, Eoin Clarke 0-4 (1tp), Colin McKiernan 1-0, Brian O'Rourke 0-3 (1f), Michael Brady 0-3 (1tp), Aodhagan Watters 0-2 (tp), Cormac Callaghan 0-1,

12 August 2026 Round 1	Crosserlough	2-22 (28) – (27) 2-21	Arva	Cavan
20:00 IST (UTC+1)		(HT: 0-12 – 2-10)		Venue: Breffni Park
		Report

=== Round 2 ===
14 August 2026 Round 2	Mullahoran	2-10 (16) – (22) 1-19	Kingscourt Stars	Cavan
20:00 IST (UTC+1)				Venue: Breffni Park
		Report

15 August 2026 Round 2	Cavan Gaels	1-29 (32) – (12) 0-12	Laragh United	Crosskeys
17:00 IST (UTC+1)				Venue: St Matthew's Park
		Report

15 August 2026 Round 2	Ballyhaise	3-15 (24) – (26) 2-20	Castlerahan	Lavey
17:00 IST (UTC+1)		(HT: 1-10 – 1-05)		Venue: Lavey GAA Grounds

15 August 2026 Round 2	Gowna	0-18 (18) – (13) 2-07	Crosserlough	Cavan
19:30 IST (UTC+1)		(HT: 0-13 – 2-02)		Venue: Breffni Park
	Pts: Cian Madden 0-4 (1f), Odhran Madden 0-4 (2tp), Oisín Pierson 0-3 (1tpf), Fiachra Brady 0-2, Daire Madden 0-2, Tiarnan Madden 0-2 (1f), Fionan Brady 0-1	Report	Pts: Paddy Lynch 0-5 (3f, 1'45), James Smith 1-1, Matthew Costello 0-1

16 August 2026 Round 2	Arva	0-22 (22) – (20) 2-14	Killygarry	Cavan
15:30 IST (UTC+1)				Venue: Breffni Park
		Report

16 August 2026 Round 2	Ramor United	2-13 (19) – (21) 1-18	Cuchúlainns	Cavan
19:00 IST (UTC+1)				Venue: Breffni Park
		Report

=== Round 3 ===
Initially most of the games in round 3 were meant to be played at Breffni Park, but due to a fire following the Laragh United vs Crosserlough game, all matches were redirected to other venues.

27 August 2026 Round 3	Laragh United	1-06 (9) – (37) 5-22	Crosserlough	Cavan
20:00 IST (UTC+1)		(HT: 0-04 – 2-08)		Venue: Breffni Park
	Pts: Seán Óg Hourihan 1-0, Ronan Fitzsimons 0-3 (1tpf), Patrick Rudden 0-1, Jake Mills 0-1 (f), Stephen Cooney 0-1	Report	Pts: Paddy Lynch 2-5 (1f, 2tpf), Harry Boylan 1-4 (1tp), Dara McVeety 1-3, Michael Donohoe 0-4 (1f, 1tpf), Oran Rehill 1-0, Kieran Smith 0-2, Shane McManus 0-2, James Smith 0-1, Matthew Costello 0-1,

28 August 2026 Round 3	Ramor United	2-21 (27) – (26) 3-17	Ballyhaise	Mullahoran
20:00 IST (UTC+1)				Venue: Our Lady of Lourdes Park
		Report

29 August 2026 Round 3	Arva	1-15 (18) – (21) 3-12	Cavan Gaels	Ballymachugh
18:00 IST (UTC+1)				Venue: Sheelin Park
		Report

29 August 2026 Round 3	Cuchúlainns	0-12 (12) – (18) 0-18	Kingscourt Stars	Cootehill
19:30 IST (UTC+1)		(HT: 0-05 – 0-10)		Venue: Hugh O'Reilly Memorial Park
		Report

30 August 2026 Round 3	Castlerahan	1-07 (10) – (28) 2-22	Gowna	Garrymore
17:00 IST (UTC+1)		(HT: 0-04 – 1-11)		Venue: Joe Crowe Park
	Pts: Dylan Brouder 1-1, Jamie Clarke 0-2, Ciarán Caldwell 0-2 (1f), Cian McCabe 0-1, Cormac Daly 0-1 ('45)		Pts: Ryan Donohoe 1-2, Daire Madden 0-5 (1tp), Cian Madden 0-5 (1tpf), Fiachra Brady 1-1, Seanie Hartin 0-4, DJ Madden 0-2, Odhran Madden 0-1, Ryan Brady 0-1, Conor Brady 0-1

30 August 2026 Round 3	Killygarry	3-13 (22) – (13) 2-07	Mullahoran	Crosskeys
18:00 IST (UTC+1)		(HT: 3-08 – 0-04)		Venue: St Matthews Park
	Pts: Cian Keaney 2-1 (1f), Darragh Noonan 0-5 (1f, 2tpf), Max Dermott 1-0, Martin Reilly 0-3 (1tp), Darragh Lovett 0-1, Cian Reilly 0-1, Conor Smith 0-1, David Talbot 0-1	Report	Pts: Cormac McKeogh 1-0, Darren Shiels 1-0, Gavin Brady 0-2 (1m), Ryan O'Reilly 0-1, Tom Harten 0-1 (f), Dylan Brady 0-1, Ultan O'Reilly 0-1, Conor Sharpe 0-1

=== Round 4 ===
6 September 2026 Round 4	Cavan Gaels	0-15 (15) – (19) 2-13	Ballyhaise	Lavey
15:00 IST (UTC+1)		(HT: 0-07 – 2-06)		Venue: Lavey GAA Grounds
	Pts: Xabi McCaffrey 0-8 (3f, 1tpf, 1tp), Evan McIntyre 0-2, Paul O'Connor 0-2, Niall Murray 0-1, Joshua Shehu 0-1, Favour Shehu 0-1,		Pts: Killian Brady 1-2, Gary O'Rourke 0-5 (1'45, 2tpf), Aodhagan Watters 1-0, Martin Conaty 0-2 (tp), Padraig Moore 0-1, Michael Brady 0-1 (f), Eoin Clarke 0-1, Cormac Clarke 0-1

6 September 2026 Round 4	Crosserlough	2-22 (28) – (25) 2-19	Kingscourt Stars	Cootehill
15:00 IST (UTC+1)		(HT: 1-10 – 1-16)		Venue: Hugh O'Reilly Memorial Park
	Pts: Paddy Lynch 0-8 (3f, 2tpf), Oran Rehill 1-1, Michael Donohoe 0-4 (1tp), Matthew Costello 1-0, Stephen Smith 0-3, Patrick O'Reilly 0-2 (tp), Harry Boylan 0-2, Padraig Shalvey 0-1, Cian Boylan 0-1		Pts: Cian Shekleton 0-11 (3f, 2tp, 1tpf), Joe Dillon 1-0, Barry Reilly 1-0, Caoimhin McGee 0-3 (1tp), John McCullagh 0-2 (tp), Kevin Curtis 0-2 (tp), Michael Gargan 0-1

6 September 2026 Round 4	Mullahoran	0-15 (15) – (14) 1-11	Arva	Garrymore
15:00 IST (UTC+1)		(HT: 0-06 – 0-06)		Venue: Joe Crowe Park
	Pts: Tom Harten 0-3, Tadhg Sheils 0-3, Oisín Maguire 0-2, Senan Sheils 0-2, Daithí Sheils 0-2, Gavin Brady 0-1, Conor Sharpe 0-1, Cormac O'Reilly 0-1		Pts: Jack Dobson 0-4 (2f), Kevin Bouchier 1-0, Peter Morris 0-3 (1tp), Barry Donnelly 0-2 (tp), Tristan Noack Hoffman 0-1, Ciarán Brady 0-1

6 September 2026 Round 4	Castlerahan	2-11 (17) – (19) 1-16	Ramor United	Killinkere
15:00 IST (UTC+1)		(HT: 1-09 – 0-08)		Venue: Jim Smith Memorial Park
	Pts: Oisín Kiernan 0-7 (2tpf, 1tp), Jamie Clarke 1-0, Cormac Daly 0-2 (tp), Senan Macken 0-1, Rory Smith 1-0		Pts: Seán McEvoy 1-7 (2f, 1pen, 1tpf, 1tp), Ben O'Hara 0-5 (2tp), Brian O'Connell 0-2, James Miller Brady 0-1, Oliver McCrystal 0-1

6 September 2026 Round 4	Killygarry	3-17 (26) – (16) 3-07	Laragh United	Cavan
15:00 IST (UTC+1)		(HT: 0-09 – 0-07)		Venue: St Felim's Park
	Pts: Oisin Brady 2-2 (1tp), Cian Keaney 1-5 (2f, 1pen, 1tp), Darragh Noonan 0-3 (2f), Mark Dermott 0-2 (tp), Neil Reilly 0-1, Brian Sheanon 0-1, Max Dermott 0-1, David Talbot 0-1, Martin Reilly 0-1		Pts: Niall Fitzpatrick 3-1 (1pen), Ronan Fitzsimons 0-4 (1f, 1'45, 1tp), Seán Óg Hourihan 0-1, Jason Walsh 0-1

6 September 2026 Round 4	Cuchúlainns	0-12 (12) – (14) 0-14	Gowna	Crosskeys
15:00 IST (UTC+1)		(HT: 0-07 – 0-06)		Venue: St Matthews Park
	Pts: Turlough Farrelly 0-4, Niall Carolan 0-3, Bryan Magee 0-2 (tp), Niall Magee 0-1 (f), Cormac O'Reilly 0-1, Ryan Tobin 0-1		Pts: Cian Madden 0-6 (1f, 1tpf), Tiarnan Madden 0-2, Odhran Madden 0-2, Cillian Brady 0-1, Cormac Brady 0-1, Fionan Brady 0-1, Conor Madden 0-1

== Relegation playoff ==
=== Relegation semi-finals ===
19 September 2026 Relegation Semi-Final	Ballyhaise	0-17 (17) – (14) 2-08	Laragh United	Ballyhaise
17:00 IST (UTC+1)		(HT: 0-10 – 0-05)		Venue: Annalee Park
	Pts: Padraig Moore 0-6, Cormac Clarke 0-2, Michael Brady 0-2 (2f), Aodhagan Watters 0-2, Killian Brady 0-2 (1f), Jack Maguire 0-1, Gary O'Rourke 0-1 (f), Keith McGovern 0-1		Pts: Ronan Fitzsimons 0-5 (1tp, 2f), Seán Óg Hourihane 1-0, Jake Mills 1-0, Patrick Rudden 0-2 (tp), Paul Smith 0-1

20 September 2026 Relegation Semi-Final	Arva	1-23 (26) – (17) 2-11	Castlerahan	Arvagh
12:30 IST (UTC+1)		(HT: 1-15 – 1-03)		Venue: Michael Cully Park
	Pts: Conal Sheridan 0-4 (2tpf), Tristan Noack Hoffman 0-3, Jack Dobson 1-5 (3f), Peter Morris 0-3 (1tp, 1f), Jonathan McCabe 0-3, Kevin Bouchier 0-3, Ciarán Brady 0-1, Martin Feeney 0-1		Pts: Cian McCabe 1-2 (1tp), Jamie Clarke 0-4 (1tp), Jack McCabe 1-0, Cormac Daly 0-3, Oisín Kiernan 0-1 (f), Rory Smith 0-1

=== Relegation final ===
25 September 2026 Relegation Final	Laragh United	1-11 (14) – (28) 4-16	Castlerahan	Cavan
18:45 IST (UTC+1)		(HT: 0-05 – 3-08)		Venue: Breffni Park
	Pts: Niall Fitzpatrick 1-1, Ronan Fitzsimons 0-4 (1tp), Jason Walsh 0-3 (1tp), Patrick Rudden 0-2, Jake Mills 0-2 (tp)		Pts: Ciarán Caldwell 1-7 (2f, 1tp), Oisín Kiernan 0-5 (1'45, 1tpf), Rory Smith 1-1, Conor Farrelly 1-0, Cormac Lynch 1-0, Jamie Clarke 0-1, Senan Macken 0-1, Cian McCabe 0-1

== Knockout stage ==
=== Bracket ===
Quarter-finals
25 September, Cavan
Killygarry	1-12
Cuchúlainns	1-16
19 September, Cavan
Kingscourt Stars	1-13
Cavan Gaels	0-10
20 September, Cavan
Crosserlough	0-22
Mullahoran	0-12
20 September, Cavan
Gowna	0-21
Ramor United	0-10

Semi-finals
4 October, Cavan
Cuchúlainns	0-17
Kingscourt Stars	3-13
3 October, Cavan
Crosserlough	1-06
Gowna	2-18

Final
11 October, Cavan
Kingscourt Stars	0-14
Gowna	4-17

=== Quarter-finals ===
The quarter-final fixtures were confirmed on the 6 September 2026.

18 September 2026 Quarter-Final	Killygarry	1-21 (24) – (24) 1-21	Cuchúlainns	Cavan
20:00 IST (UTC+1)		(HT: 1-16 – 0-07)		Venue: Breffni Park
	Pts: Cian Keaney 1-7 (3tp), Darragh Noonan 0-10 (3tp, 1tpf), Max Dermott 0-1, Martin Reilly 0-1 (f), Oisin Brady 0-1, Conor Smith 0-1	Report	Pts: Evan Doughty 0-13 (3tp, 2tpf), Mark Gilsenan 1-0, Turlough Farrelly 0-2, Cormac O'Reilly 0-2, Niall Carolan 0-1, Ryan Tobin 0-1, Adam O'Reilly 0-1, Bryan McGee 0-1

19 September 2026 Quarter-Final	Kingscourt Stars	1-13 (16) – (10) 0-10	Cavan Gaels	Cavan
18:45 IST (UTC+1)		(HT: 0-03 – 0-08)		Venue: Breffni Park
	Pts: Cian Shekleton 1-3 (1f), Jordan Morris 0-6 (4f), Peter Corrigan 0-2, John McCullagh 0-1, Damien McCormack 0-1	Report	Pts: Padraig Sexton 0-3 (1tp), Emmanuel Shehu 0-3 (1tp), Ben Tully 0-1, Xabi McCaffrey 0-1, Kevin Donohoe 0-1 (m), Niall Murray 0-1

20 September 2026 Quarter-Final	Crosserlough	0-22 (22) – (12) 0-12	Mullahoran	Cavan
15:45 IST (UTC+1)		(HT: 0-15 – 0-05)		Venue: Breffni Park
	Pts: Paddy Lynch 0-10 (2tpf, 4f), Brandon Boylan 0-4, Stephen Smith 0-2, Emmett Boylan 0-2 (tp), Harry Boylan 0-1, Dylan Harten 0-1, Michael Donohoe 0-1, Oran Rehill 0-1	Report	Pts: Cormac O'Reilly 0-5 (1'45, 2f), Cormac McKeogh 0-3 (1tp), Daithí Sheils 0-2 (tp), Conor Sharpe 0-1, Tadhg Sheils 0-1

20 September 2026 Quarter-Final	Gowna	0-21 (21) – (10) 0-10	Ramor United	Cavan
19:00 IST (UTC+1)		(HT: 0-07 – 0-02)		Venue: Breffni Park
	Pts: Fiachra Brady 0-5, Conor Casey 0-4 (2tp), Odhran Madden 0-3, Oisín Pierson 0-2 (2f), Ryan Donohoe 0-2, Tiarnan Madden 0-2 (tp), Conor Madden 0-2 (tp), Daire Madden 0-1	Report	Pts: Ben O'Hara 0-4 (2tp), Seán McEvoy 0-3 (3f), Matthew Smith 0-1, Adam O'Connell 0-1, James Miller Brady 0-1 (f)

=== Quarter-Final Replays ===
25 September 2026 Quarter-Final Replay	Killygarry	1-12 (15) – (19) 1-16	Cuchúlainns	Cavan
20:15 IST (UTC+1)		(HT: 1-06 – 1-07)		Venue: Breffni Park
	Pts: Cian Keaney 1-2 (1'45, 1f), Darragh Lovett 0-4, Oisín Brady 0-4 (1'45), Matthew McKenna 0-1, Ben Mooney 0-1	Report	Pts: Niall Magee 1-3 (1tp, 1f), Evan Doughty 0-5 (2f, 1tp), Bryan Magee 0-4 (1tp, 1f), Ryan Tobin 0-1, Mark Gilsenan 0-1, Cian Doughty 0-1, Cormac O'Reilly 0-1 (f)

=== Semi-finals ===
3 October 2026 Semi-Final	Crosserlough	1-06 (9) – (24) 2-18	Gowna	Cavan
18:45 IST (UTC+1)		(HT: 0-02 – 2-10)		Venue: Breffni Park
	Pts: Oran Rehill 1-0, James Smith 0-3 (1tp), Brendan Boylan 0-2 (tpf), Pierce Smith 0-1 (f)		Pts: Daire Madden 1-1, Oisín Pierson 1-1 (1f), Cian Madden 0-4, Conor Brady 0-4 (2tp), Ryan Donohoe 0-3 (1'45), Tiarnan Madden 0-2, Seánie Hartin 0-1, Conor Casey 0-1, Ryan McGahern 0-1

4 October 2026 Semi-Final	Kingscourt Stars	3-13 (22) – (17) 0-17	Cuchúlainns	Cavan
18:30 IST (UTC+1)		(HT: 2-06 – 0-09)		Venue: Breffni Park
	Pts: Peter Corrigan 2-0, Cian Shekleton 1-3, Jordan Morris 0-4 (1f), Joe Dillon 0-3 (1tp), Padraig Faulkner 0-1, Barry Tully 0-1, Caoimhín McGee 0-1		Pts: Evan Doughty 0-3 (1f), Ryan Tobin 0-3 (1tp), Adam O'Reilly 0-3 (1tp), Cormac O'Reilly 0-3, Niall Magee 0-2 (1f), Donagh Lynch 0-1, Adrian Taite 0-1, Turlough Farrelly 0-1

=== Final ===
11 October 2026
16:00 IST (UTC+1)
Final

Report

Gowna	4-17 (29) – (14) 0-14	Kingscourt Stars
(HT: 3-09 – 0-07)
Pts: Oisín Pierson 1-3 (1tp, 1f), Conor Casey 1-1, Tiarnan Madden 0-4 (4f), Cillian Brady 1-0, Seanie Harten 1-0, Ryan Donoghue 0-2 (tpf), Fiachra Brady 0-1, Conor Brady 0-1, Ryan Brady 0-1, Daire Madden 0-1, Odhran Madden 0-1, Cian Madden 0-1 (f), Robbie Fitzpatrick 0-1		Pts: Jordan Morris 0-8 (1tp, 1tpf, 4f), Cian Shekleton 0-2 (1f), Kevin Curtis 0-2 (tp), Barry Tully 0-1, Caoimhín McGee 0-1

Breffni Park, Cavan

Gowna	Kingscourt Stars
