= 2026–27 All-Ireland Senior Club Football Championship =

Gaelic football competition

2026-27 All-Ireland Senior Club Football Championship
- Dates: 31 October 2026 – 16/17 January 2027
- Teams: 32
- Sponsor: Allied Irish Bank

Provincial Champions

The 2026-27 All-Ireland Senior Club Football Championship was the 56th staging of the All-Ireland Senior Club Football Championship, the Gaelic Athletic Association's premier inter-county club Gaelic football tournament. The competition will run from 31 October/1 November 2026 to 16/17 January 2027.

The defending champions were Dingle; however, they were knocked out of the Kerry SFC in the first round by Spa on a scoreline of 1-17 to 1-11.

== Format ==
Each Irish county plays a county championship, with one club from each county progressing to the All-Ireland Senior Club Football Championship. In this, each province plays their own championship (all being straight knockout) with the four provincial champions qualifying for the All-Ireland semi-finals.

The Kilkenny champion do not compete in Leinster, instead playing in the 2026-27 All-Ireland Intermediate Club Football Championship, while the London champion compete in the Connacht Club SFC.

== Teams ==
Team	County	Captain(s)	Manager(s)	Most recent success		
Team	County	Captain(s)	Manager(s)	All-Ireland	Provincial	County
An Tóchar	Wicklow	Gavin Kenny	Tom Fee	—	—	1995
Ballinamore Seán O'Heslin's	Leitrim	Brian Banks	Mark Henry	—	—	2021
Castlebar Mitchels	Mayo	John MacMonagle	Kevin Filan	—	2015	2017
Clonduff	Down	Charlie Carr; Stephen McConville	Gearóid Adams	—	—	2000
Clonguish	Longford	Matthew Carey	Dominic Corrigan	—	—	2009
Crossmaglen Rangers	Armagh	Callum Cumiskey	Shane Lennon	2012	2015	2023
Cuala	Dublin	Eoin Kennedy	Derek Dunne	2025	2024	2024
The Downs	Westmeath	Ian Martin; Luke Loughlin	Dermot Power	—	—	2025
Dr Crokes	Kerry	Tony Brosnan	Edmund O'Sullivan	2017	2024	2024
Edendork	Tyrone	Conor Mallon	Brian McGuckin	—	—	—
Éire Óg, Ennis	Clare	Aaron Fitzgerald	Shane Daniels	—	—	2025
Erne Gaels	Fermanagh	Ryan Lyons	Barry O'Hagan	—	—	2025
Fr Casey's	Limerick	Diarmuid Buckley	Keith Harnett	—	—	2006
Fulham Irish	London	Andrew Walsh	Hurl Dockry; Alan Kelleher; Cormac Duffy; Con Gordan	—	—	2023
Gowna	Cavan	Conor Brady	Vinny Corey	—	—	2023
Kilanerin–Ballyfad	Wexford	Páraic Hughes	Padraig Murphy	—	—	2008
Loughmore–Castleiney	Tipperary	Brian McGrath	Greg Ramsbottom	—	—	2024
Magherafelt	Derry	Conor McCluskey	Gavin Devlin	—	—	2019
Nemo Rangers	Cork	Stephen Cronin	Robbie O'Dwyer	2003	2019	2022
Newtown Blues	Louth	Ciarán Downey	Johnny Clerkin	—	—	2019
Portarlington	Laois	Paddy O'Sullivan	Ronan Sweeney	—	—	2025
Rathgormack	Waterford	Jason Curry	Kenny Hassett	—	—	2025
Rathvilly	Carlow	Colin Byrne	Kevin Byrne	—	—	2024
Salthill–Knocknacarra	Galway	Daniel O'Flaherty	Finian Hanley	2006	2005	2012
Sarsfields	Kildare	Barry Coffey	Vinny Walsh	—	—	2019
Scotstown	Monaghan	Rory Beggan	David McCague	—	2025	2025
St Brigid's	Antrim	Jack Dowling	Cathal Murray	—	—	—
St Brigid's	Roscommon	Ruaidhrí Fallon	Damien Mulligan	2013	2025	2025
St Eunan's	Donegal	Conor O'Donnell	Kieran Donnelly	—	—	2024
St Mary's	Sligo	Scott Lynch	Mark Breheny	—	1983	2015
Tullamore	Offaly	Cormac Egan	Paul McConway	—	—	2025
Wolfe Tones	Meath	Shane Glynn; Oisín Martin	Shane McCoy	—	—	2021

== Connacht ==
Quarter-finals
St Brigid's (Roscommon)	2-24
St Mary's (Sligo)	0-09
Ballinamore Seán O'Heslins (Leitrim)	2-15
Salthill–Knocknacarra (Galway)	3-16

Semi-finals
St Brigid's (Roscommon)	1-10
Salthill–Knocknacarra (Galway)	0-14
Fulham Irish (London)	1-09
Castlebar Mitchels (Mayo)	1-22

Final
Salthill–Knocknacarra (Galway)
Castlebar Mitchels (Mayo)

=== Quarter-finals ===
7 November 2026 Quarter-final	St Brigid's (Roscommon)	2-24 (30) – (9) 0-09	St Mary's (Sligo)	Roscommon
13:30 GMT (UTC+0)		(HT: 2-08 – 0-04)		Venue: Dr Hyde Park
	Pts: Ben O'Carroll 1-7 (2tp), Bobby Nugent 1-4 (2f), Conor Hand 0-4, Conor Carroll 0-2 (tpf), Charlie O'Carroll 0-2, Brian Stack 0-1, Brian Derwin 0-1, Robbie Dolan 0-1, Paul McGrath 0-1, Adam Lennon 0-1	Report	Pts: Eli Rooney 0-5 (1f, 1'45, 1tpf), Nathan Rooney 0-2 (2f), Ronan Niland 0-1, Paul Kilcoyne 0-1	Referee: Christopher Ryan (Galway)

8 November 2026 Quarter-final	Ballinamore Seán O'Heslins (Leitrim)	2-15 (21) – (25) 3-16	Salthill–Knocknacarra (Galway)	Carrick-on-Shannon
13:30 GMT (UTC+0)		(HT: 1-06 – 1-09)		Venue: Páirc Seán Mac Diarmada
	Pts: Tom Prior 1-3, Paul Honeyman 0-5 (1tp, 1tpf), Dillon Beirne 1-0, Paul Moran 0-2 (tpf), Shane Moran 0-2 (tp), Niall McGovern 0-1 (m), Donal Feely 0-1	Report	Pts: Tomó Cullinane 1-4 (1tp, 1tpf), Robert Finnerty 1-2 (2f), Cathal Sweeney 0-4, Colm Finnerty 1-0, Mathew Thompson 0-3 (1tp), Cillian O'Toole 0-1, Dara Conneely 0-1, Evan Wynne 0-1	Referee: Ronan Hynes (Sligo)

=== Semi-finals ===
14 November 2026 Semi-final	Fulham Irish (London)	1-09 (12) – (25) 1-22	Castlebar Mitchels (Mayo)	Ruislip
13:00 GMT (UTC+0)		(HT: 0-03 – 0-09)		Venue: McGovern Park
	Pts: Niall O'Leary 1-1, Conal Gallagher 0-2 (1f), Ben O'Connell 0-2 (1f), Cormac Mallaghan 0-2 (tp), Andy Walsh 0-1 ('45), Seán Caffrey 0-1 (f)	Report	Pts: Neil Douglas 1-3 (2f), Bob Tuohy 0-5 (2tp), Ben Joyce 0-3 (1tp), Calum Filan 0-3, Joe Forry 0-2, Eoghan Hughes 0-2, Paddy Durcan 0-1, Ultan O'Reilly 0-1, Anthony Boyle 0-1, Cian Walsh 0-1	Referee: Ian Monaghan (Roscommon)

15 November 2026 Semi-final	Salthill–Knocknacarra (Galway)	0-14 (14) – (13) 1-10	St Brigid's (Roscommon)	Galway
15:15 GMT (UTC+0)		(HT: 0-04 – 1-07)		Venue: Pearse Stadium
	Pts: Robert Finnerty 0-4 (1f), Cathal Sweeney 0-2, Aaron Mannion 0-2, Mark Mannion 0-2 (tp), Matthew Thompson 0-1, Daniel O'Flaherty 0-1, Cillian O'Toole 0-1, Brian Conlon 0-1	Report	Pts: Ben O'Carroll 0-4 (1f, 1tp), Conor Hand 1-0, Brian Derwin 0-3, Shane Cunnane 0-2 (tpf), Ronan Stack 0-1,	Referee: Paul Lydon (Mayo)

=== Final ===
29 November 2026 Final	Castlebar Mitchels (Mayo)	v	Salthill–Knocknacarra (Galway)	Castlebar
13:00 GMT (UTC+0)				Venue: MacHale Park

== Leinster ==
First round
Cuala (Dublin)	0-16
Tullamore (Offaly)	1-11
The Downs (Westmeath)	2-17
Clonguish (Longford)	1-18
Kilanerin–Ballyfad (Wexford)	0-17
Newtown Blues (Louth)	1-13

Quarter-finals
Cuala (Dublin)	1-18
Sarsfields (Kildare)	0-11
Rathvilly (Carlow)	1-12
Portarlington (Laois)	1-13
The Downs (Westmeath)	3-13
Kilanerin–Ballyfad (Wexford)	0-15
Wolfe Tones (Meath)	1-20
An Tóchar (Wicklow)	2-13

Semi-finals
Cuala (Dublin)
Portarlington (Laois)
The Downs (Westmeath)
Wolfe Tones (Meath)

Final
Semi-final Winner
Semi-final Winner

=== First Round ===
1 November 2026 First Round	The Downs (Westmeath)	2-17 (23) – (21) 1-18	Clonguish (Longford)	Mullingar
14:00 GMT (UTC+0)		(HT: 2-07 – 0-09)		Venue: TEG Cusack Park
	Pts: Luke Loughlin 1-4 (1tpf), Michael Moloney 1-3, Tom Tuite 0-4, Ian Martin 0-2, Niall Mitchell 0-2 (tp), Kevin O'Sullivan 0-1, Jonathan Lynam 0-1	Report	Pts: Michael Flynn 0-10 (2tpf, 5f), James Hagan 1-1, Matthew Carey 0-3, Kevin Baskett 0-2, Jamie Dorr 0-1, Cormac Flynn 0-1	Referee: Colm McCullough (Louth)

1 November 2026 First Round	Kilanerin–Ballyfad (Wexford)	0-17 (17) – (16) 1-13	Newtown Blues (Louth)	Wexford
15:00 GMT (UTC+0)		(HT: 0-11 – 1-05)		Venue: Chadwicks Wexford Park
	Pts: Dean O'Toole 0-7 (5f), Niall Hughes 0-5 (2tp), Cian Hughes 0-2, Eoin Hughes 0-1, Tom Mordaunt 0-1, Seán Forde 0-1 (f)	Report	Pts: Conor Branigan 0-4 (1tp), Ciarán Downey 0-4 (1f, 1tp), Ross Nally 1-0, Conor MacCriosta 0-2, Emmett Carolan 0-1, Alan Connor 0-1, Jamie Kelly 0-1 (f)	Referee: James Foley (Carlow)

1 November 2026 First Round	Cuala (Dublin)	0-16 (16) – (14) 1-11	Tullamore (Offaly)	Dublin
15:30 GMT (UTC+0)		(HT: 0-06 – 1-04)		Venue: Parnell Park
	Pts: Con O'Callaghan 0-6 (1tp, 2f, 1'45), Niall O'Callaghan 0-3, David O'Dowd 0-2, Peadar Ó Cofaigh Byrne 0-2, Eoghan O'Callaghan 0-1, Charlie McMorrow 0-1, Eoin Kennedy 0-1	Report	Pts: Harry Plunkett 0-10 (2tp, 4f, 1'45), Luke Plunkett 1-0, Diarmuid Egan 0-1	Referee: Patrick Coyle (Meath)

=== Quarter-finals ===
14 November 2026 Quarter-final	Cuala (Dublin)	1-18 (21) – (11) 0-11	Sarsfields (Kildare)	Dublin
16:45 GMT (UTC+0)		(HT: 0-06 – 0-07)		Venue: Parnell Park
	Pts: Con O'Callaghan 0-6 (2f), Dan O'Sullivan 1-1, Niall O'Callaghan 0-4 (1tp), Eoin Kennedy 0-3 (1tp), Charlie McMorrow 0-1, Peter Duffy 0-1, Jamie Conroy 0-1, Conor Mullaly 0-1	Report	Pts: Ben McCormack 0-2, Ryan Kearney 0-2, Con Kavanagh 0-1, Cathal White 0-1 (m), Shea Ryan 0-1, Daragh Ryan 0-1, Conor O'Donovan 0-1, Luke Mahon 0-1, Karl Hartley 0-1	Referee: Alan Coyne (Westmeath)

15 November 2026 Quarter-final	Wolfe Tones (Meath)	1-20 (23) – (19) 2-13	An Tóchar (Wicklow)	Ashbourne
13:30 GMT (UTC+0)		(HT: 0-10 – 0-03)		Venue: Donaghmore Ashbourne GAA
	Pts: Kyle Moran 0-6, Cian O'Neill 1-2 (1tp), Oisín Martin 0-3, Caolán Ward 0-3 (1tpf), Sarán Ó Fionnagain 0-2, Ben Reilly 0-2, Adam O'Neill 0-1, Thomas O'Reilly 0-1	Report	Pts: John Paul Nolan 1-4 (1-2f, 1tpf), Conor Fee 1-3, Luca Nolan 0-2 (tp), Oisín Cullen 0-2, JJ Brady 0-1, Joao Vitor Fagundes 0-1	Referee: Kevin Williamson (Offaly)

15 November 2026 Quarter-final	The Downs (Westmeath)	3-13 (22) – (15) 0-15	Kilanerin–Ballyfad (Wexford)	Mullingar
13:30 GMT (UTC+0)		(HT: 1-03 – 0-10)		Venue: TEG Cusack Park
	Pts: Kevin O'Sullivan 1-2, Niall Mitchell 1-1, Luke Loughlin 0-4 (1f), Joe Moran 1-0, Ian Martin 0-2 (tp), Michael Moloney 0-1, Jonathan Lynam 0-1, Tom Tuite 0-1, Philip Martin 0-1	Report	Pts: Dean O'Toole 0-8 (1tpf, 4f), Cian Hughes 0-2, Conor Kinsella 0-2, Padraic Hughes 0-1, Eoin Hughes 0-1, Niall Hughes 0-1	Referee: Anthony Nolan (Wicklow)

15 November 2026 Quarter-final	Rathvilly (Carlow)	1-12 (15) – (16) 1-13	Portarlington (Laois)	Carlow
14:30 GMT (UTC+0)		(HT: 0-06 – 1-05)		Venue: Netwatch Cullen Park
	Pts: Liam Gavin 1-9 (4tpf, 1f), Peter Burgess 0-2, Conor Doyle 0-1	Report	Pts: Colm Murphy 1-6 (3f), Ronan Coffey 0-3, Rioghan Murphy 0-1 (f), Robbie Piggot 0-1, Keith Bracken 0-1, Seán Moran 0-1	Referee: Ian Howley (Dublin)

=== Semi-finals ===
28 November 2026 Semi-final	Wolfe Tones (Meath)	v	The Downs (Westmeath)	Ashbourne
13:30 GMT (UTC+0)				Venue: Donaghmore Ashbourne GAA

28 November 2026 Semi-final	Cuala (Dublin)	v	Portarlington (Laois)	Dublin
14:30 GMT (UTC+0)				Venue: Parnell Park
				Referee: Andrew Smith (Meath)

=== Final ===
5 December 2026 Final	SF1 Winner (Leinster)	v	SF2 Winner (Leinster)	Dublin
17:15 GMT (UTC+0)				Venue: Croke Park

== Munster ==
Quarter-finals
Rathgormack (Waterford)	2-15
Éire Óg, Ennis (Clare)	1-13
Nemo Rangers (Cork)	0-19
Loughmore–Castleiney (Tipperary)	1-08

Semi-finals
Rathgormack (Waterford)	2–10
Dr Crokes (Kerry)	0–14
Nemo Rangers (Cork)	3–16
Fr Casey's (Limerick)	0–12

Final
Rathgormack (Waterford)
Nemo Rangers (Cork)

=== Quarter-finals ===
8 November 2026 Quarter-final	Nemo Rangers (Cork)	0-19 (19) – (11) 1-08	Loughmore–Castleiney (Tipperary)	Cork
13:15 GMT (UTC+0)		(HT: 0-06 – 1-03)		Venue: Páirc Uí Rinn
	Pts: Mark Cronin 0-9 (1tp, 1tpf, 3f), Ross Corkery 0-3, Kevin O'Donovan 0-2, Ronan Dalton 0-2, Conor Horgan 0-2, Kieran Histon 0-1	Report	Pts: John McGrath 1-2 (1tp), Liam McGrath 0-3 (3f), Noel McGrath 0-2 (tp), Ciarán Connolly 0-1	Referee: Chris Maguire (Clare)

8 November 2026 Quarter-final	Rathgormack (Waterford)	2-15 (21) – (16) 1-13	Éire Óg, Ennis (Clare)	Dungarvan
14:00 GMT (UTC+0)		(HT: 1-07 – 1-05)		Venue: Fraher Field
	Pts: Jason Curry 0-9 (3tp, 3f), Reece O'Mahony 1-1, Stephen Curry 1-0, Billy Power 0-2, Conor Murray 0-2, Francis Roche 0-1	Report	Pts: Mark McInerney 0-9 (7f, 1tpf), Gavin Murray 1-0, Jack Joyce 0-2 (tp), Ciarán Russell 0-2	Referee: James Regan (Cork)

=== Semi-finals ===
22 November 2026 Quarter-final	Nemo Rangers (Cork)	3–16 (25) – (12) 0–12	Fr Casey's (Limerick)	Cork
13:15 GMT (UTC+0)		(HT: 3-09 – 0-02)		Venue: Páirc Uí Rinn
	Pts: Mark Cronin 1-2 (1pen, 1f), Luke Horgan 1-2, Ross Corkery 1-2, Ronan Dalton 0-4 (1tpf), Bryan Hayes 0-2, Kieran Histon 0-1, Jack Horgan 0-1, Bríáin Murphy 0-1, Conor Horgan 0-1	Report	Pts: Eliah Riordan 0-4 (1tp, 1'45, 1f), Adrian Enright 0-3, Daniel Daly 0-1, Michael Kilbridge 0-1, Ronan Quirke 0-1 (f), Jamie O'Connor 0-1 (f), Leon Curtin 0-1	Referee: Eoin Morrissey (Waterford)

22 November 2026 Quarter-final	Rathgormack (Waterford)	2–10 (16) – (14) 0–14	Dr Crokes (Kerry)	Dungarvan
14:00 GMT (UTC+0)		(HT: 0-07 – 0-09)		Venue: Fraher Field
	Pts: Francis Roche 0-6 (2tp), Jason Curry 1-2 (1pen, 1tp), Conor Murray 1-1, Billy Power 0-1	Report	Pts: Tony Brosnan 0-5 (2f), Cian McMahon 0-3 (1tp), Charlie Keating 0-3 (1tp), David Shaw 0-1, Brian Looney 0-1, Tom Doyle 0-1	Referee: David Murnane (Cork)

=== Final ===
6 December 2026 Quarter-final	Nemo Rangers (Cork)	v	Rathgormack (Waterford)
13:30 GMT (UTC+0)

== Ulster ==
Round 1
Clonduff (Down)	0-12
Edendork (Tyrone)	0-17

Quarter-finals
Erne Gaels (Fermanagh)	0-10
St Eunan's (Donegal)	1-14
Scotstown (Monaghan)	2-21
Magherafelt (Derry)	2-20
St Brigid's (Antrim)	2-11
Edendork (Tyrone)	1-15
Gowna (Cavan)	2-18
Crossmaglen Rangers (Armagh)	1-22

Semi-finals
St Eunan's (Donegal)	0-27 (2)
Scotstown (Monaghan)	1-24 (4)
Edendork (Tyrone)	0-17
Crossmaglen Rangers (Armagh)	1-18

Final
Scotstown (Monaghan)
Crossmaglen Rangers (Armagh)

=== Round 1 ===
31 October 2026 Round 1	Clonduff (Down)	0-12 (12) – (17) 0-17	Edendork (Tyrone)	Newry
18:15 GMT (UTC+0)		(HT: 0-06 – 0-10)		Venue: Páirc Esler
	Pts: Stephen McConville 0-4 (1tpf), Barry O'Hagan 0-3 (1f), Senan Carr 0-2, Arthur McConville 0-2, Eamon Brown 0-1	Report	Pts: Darren McCurry 0-8 (1tp, 1tpf), Niall Morgan 0-4 (1tpf), John McLernon 0-2, Fiachra Nelis 0-1, Correy Bell 0-1, Patrick McLernon 0-1	Referee: Martin McNally (Monaghan)

=== Quarter-finals ===
7 November 2026 Quarter-Final	Erne Gaels (Fermanagh)	0-10 (10) – (17) 1-14	St Eunan's (Donegal)	Enniskillen
17:00 GMT (UTC+0)		(HT: 0-03 – 0-07)		Venue: Brewster Park
	Pts: Ultan Kelm 0-5 (1tp, 2f), Oisín Kelm 0-3 (1tp), Ryan Lyons 0-1, Seamus Ryder 0-1 (m)	Report	Pts: Conor O'Donnell Jnr 1-5 (3f), Ciarán Moore 0-2, Eoin McGeehin 0-2, Kieran Tobin 0-1, Conor O'Donnell Snr 0-1, Shane O'Donnell 0-1, Dillon Doogan 0-1, Eoin Dowling 0-1	Referee: Kevin Faloon (Armagh)

7 November 2026 Quarter-Final	Gowna (Cavan)	2-18 (24) – (25) 1-22	Crossmaglen Rangers (Armagh)	Cavan
19:15 GMT (UTC+0)		(HT: 1-13 – 1-05)		Venue: Breffni Park
	Pts: Ryan Donohue 1-3 (1tp), Cian Madden 0-4 (4f), Conor Casey 0-4 (1tp), Conor Madden 1-0, Fiachra Brady 0-2 (tp), Daire Madden 0-2 (tp), Conor Brady 0-1, Seánie Hartin 0-1, Odhran Madden 0-1	Report	Pts: Oisín O'Neill 0-8 (1tpf, 1tp, 1f), Rian O'Neill 0-5 (1tpf, 1tp), Cian McConville 1-1 (1f), Pearse Blessing 0-3 (1tp), Keelan McEntee 0-2, Odhran Carraher 0-1, Callum Cumiskey 0-1, Seamus Teelan 0-1	Referee: Paul Faloon (Down)

8 November 2026 Quarter-Final	Scotstown (Monaghan)	2-21 (27) – (26) 2-20 (a.e.t.)	Magherafelt (Derry)	Clones
13:30 GMT (UTC+0)		(HT: 1-10 – 1-06) (FT: 1-15 – 1-15)		Venue: St Tiernach's Park
	Pts: Tommy Mallen 1-3 (1tp), Shane Carey 1-2, Nicky Sherlock 0-4, Francis Maguire 0-2, Rory Beggan 0-2 (tpf), Jack McCarron 0-2, Mattie Maguire 0-2, Mícheál McCarville 0-2, Kieran Hughes 0-1, Max Maguire 0-1	Report	Pts: Shane Heavron 0-6 (1tpf, 2f), Cormac Murphy 1-3, Patrick McLarnon 0-4, Conall Higgins 0-4 (1tp), Caolan Higgins 1-0, Rory Small 0-3 (1tp)	Referee: Noel Mooney (Cavan)

8 November 2026 Quarter-Final	Edendork (Tyrone)	1-15 (18) – (17) 2-11	St Brigid's (Antrim)	Dungannon
17:30 GMT (UTC+0)		(HT: 1-10 – 1-05)		Venue: O’Neill Park
	Pts: John McLernon 1-3, Darren McCurry 0-5, Harry Óg Conlan 0-2, Niall Morgan 0-2 (tp), Patrick McLernon 0-1, Dinal Maneely 0-1, Ben Cullen 0-1	Report	Pts: Joe Finnegan 1-0, Paul Bradley 1-0 (pen), JJ HIggins 0-3 (1f), Niall Duffy 0-2, Ronan McGrady 0-2, Dara Quinn 0-1, Patrick Finnegan 0-1, James Smith 0-1, Joe Logan 0-1	Referee: Conor Dourneen (Cavan)

=== Semi-finals ===
21 November 2026 Semi-final	St Eunan's (Donegal)	0-27 (27) – (27) 1-24 (a.e.t.) (2–4 pen)	Scotstown (Monaghan)	Enniskillen
19:15 GMT (UTC+0)		(HT: 0-07 – 0-10) (FT: 0-21 – 1-18)		Venue: Brewster Park
	Pts: Niall O'Donnell 0-5 (1f, 1tp), Shane O'Donnell 0-4 (2tp), Eoin Dowling 0-3 (1tp), Oran Winston 0-3 (1tp), Conor O'Donnell Jnr 0-3 (1f), Eoin McGeehin 0-3, Brian MacIntyre 0-2, Shaun Patton 0-2 (tpf), Conor O'Donnell Snr 0-1, Luke McGuinness 0-1	Report	Pts: Conor McCarthy 0-5 (1f, 1tpf), Tommy Mallen 0-4 (1tp), Nicky Sherlock 0-3, Darragh Murray 1-0, Shane Carey 0-2 (2f), Mattie Maguire 0-2, Rory Beggan 0-2 (tpf), Kieran Hughes 0-2 (1f), Ryan O'Toole 0-1, Donnchadh Connolly 0-1, Francis Maguire 0-1, Max Maguire 0-1	Referee: Kieran Eannetta (Tyrone)
		Penalty shootout
	Niall O'Donnell; Pauric McGettigan; James Kelly; Dillon Doogan		Rory Beggan; Darren Hughes; Kieran Hughes; Shane Carey; Conor McCarthy

22 November 2026 Semi-final	Crossmaglen Rangers (Armagh)	1-18 (21) – (17) 0-17	Edendork (Tyrone)	Newry
15:30 GMT (UTC+0)		(HT: 0-09 – 0-08)		Venue: Páirc Esler
	Pts: Rian O'Neill 1-6 (1pen, 2tpf, 1tp), Oisín O'Neill 0-4 (2f), Cian McConville 0-3, Aaron O'Neill 0-2, Stephen Morris 0-1, Padraig Stuttard 0-1, Harry Cumiskey 0-1	Report	Pts: Neil Kilpatrick 0-5 (2tp), Niall Morgan 0-3 (1f, 1tpf), Harry Óg Conlan 0-3, Correy Bell 0-2 (tp), Ben Cullen 0-1, Darren McCurry 0-1 (f), Patrick McLernon 0-1, Luke Ferguson 0-1	Referee: Diarmuid Boylan (Monaghan)

=== Final ===
6 December 2026 Final	Scotstown (Monaghan)	v	Crossmaglen Rangers (Armagh)
15:30 GMT (UTC+0)

== All-Ireland ==
=== All-Ireland semi-finals ===
2/3 January 2027 Final	Connacht Representatives (Connacht)	v	Munster Representatives (Munster)

2/3 January 2027 Final	Leinster Representatives (Leinster)	v	Ulster Representatives (Ulster)

=== All-Ireland Final ===
16/17 January 2027 Final	SF1 Winners (Connacht/Munster)	v	SF2 Winners (Leinster/Ulster)
