= Oisín Kiernan =

Cavan Gaelic footballer

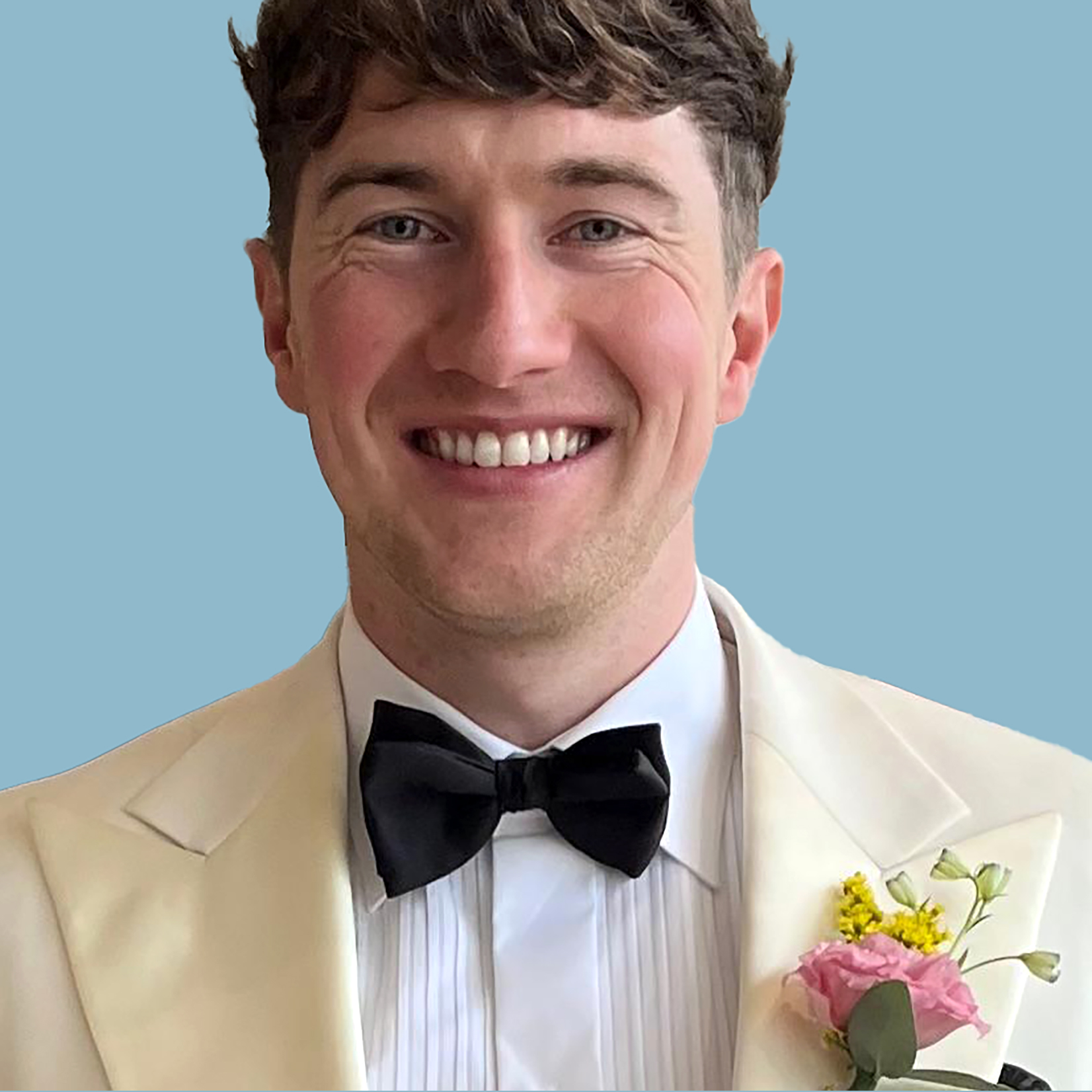
- Oisín Kiernan, wedding day.

Personal information
- Native name: Oisín Mac Thiarnáin (Irish)
- Born: 1 October 1992 (age 34)

Sport
- Sport: Gaelic Football
- Position: Wing Back/Wing Forward
Clubs
- Years: Club
- 2017–: St Brigid's; Castlerahan
Club titles
- Cavan titles: 2
Inter-county
- Years: County
- 2018–: Cavan
Inter-county titles
- Ulster titles: 1

Oisín Kiernan (born 1 October 1992) is an Irish Gaelic footballer who plays for the Cavan county team. He plays his club football with Castlerahan, having previously played for the St Brigid's club in Meath.

== Playing career ==
=== Club ===
==== St Brigid's ====
Kiernan played with the St Brigid's club from a young age, and later joined the club's senior team. Kiernan played with the club up until he suffered a cruciate ligament injury at the age of 23, which kept him out for seven months.

==== Castlerahan ====
Kiernan transferred to Castlerahan for the 2017 season. On 8 October 2017, Kiernan was at full back for the county final against Cavan Gaels. Kiernan scored two points but for the third consecutive year, Castlerahan came out on the losing side.

In 2018, Castlerahan were in the county final once again where they faced Crosserlough. Castlerahan claimed their first championship, but Kiernan had been diagnosed with cancer and didn't feature. On 5 November, Kiernan started the Ulster Club loss to Derry champions Eoghan Rua.

Castlerahan reached the county final for the fifth consecutive year in 2019, facing Ramor United on 13 October. Kiernan scored one point as Castlerahan edged the final for their second title in a row.

After a surprise relegation from Senior in 2021, Castlerahan reached the final of the Intermediate Championship in 2022. On 9 October, Kiernan scored a point in the final against Ballyhaise as Castlerahan won by a goal.

=== Inter-county ===
==== Meath ====
Kiernan represented Meath at under-21 and junior level, but never represented his native county at senior level.

==== Cavan ====
Kiernan joined the Cavan panel ahead of the 2018 season. On 27 January 2018, Kiernan made his National League debut, scoring a point in a draw against Clare. On 1 April, Kiernan was in the half back line as Cavan faced Roscommon in the National League Division 2 Final. Roscommon were winners on a 4–16 to 4–12 scoreline. On 13 May, Kiernan made his championship debut in a loss to Donegal.

Kiernan didn't feature for Cavan in the early part of 2019 as he was going through cancer treatment. On 24 March 2019, Kiernan featured as a substitute against Dublin in the National League, and started the Ulster quarter-final win over Monaghan on 19 May. Kiernan started the Ulster final loss to Donegal on 23 June.

On 22 November 2020, Kiernan was in the half-forward line as Cavan faced Donegal in the Ulster Final for the second year in a row. Kiernan scored two points as Cavan bridged a 23-year gap with a 1–13 to 0–12 win. On 5 December, Kiernan started the All-Ireland semi-final, scoring two points in the loss to eventual champions Dublin.

On 9 July, Kiernan started at wing back in the inaugural Tailteann Cup decider against Westmeath. Kiernan scored a point but Westmeath were four-point winners.

== Personal life ==
In September 2018, Kiernan was diagnosed with testicular cancer. He had found a lump a month earlier, but didn't get it looked at because he wanted to keep playing football, a decision he later regretted. Kiernan continued training through chemotherapy, and by March 2019, Kiernan was cancer-free.

== Honours ==
Cavan

- Ulster Senior Football Championship (1): 2020
- National Football League Division 4 (1): 2022

Castlerahan

- Cavan Senior Football Championship (2): 2018, 2019
- Cavan Intermediate Football Championship (1): 2022

Individual

- Irish News Ulster All-Star (1): 2020
