= 2019 Cavan Intermediate Football Championship =

2019 Cavan IFC
Tournament details
- County: Cavan
- Province: Ulster
- Year: 2019
- Trophy: Tommy Gilroy Cup
- Sponsor: Hotel Kilmore
- Date: 26 July - 6 October 2019
- Teams: 15

Winners
- Champions: Laragh United (2nd win)
- Manager: Jody Devine
- Captain: Fergal McKenna
- Qualify for: 2019 Ulster Club IFC

Runners-up
- Runners-up: Belturbet
- Manager: Padraig Dolan
- Captain: Brendan Fitzpatrick

Promotion/Relegation
- Promoted team(s): Laragh United
- Relegated team(s): Swanlinbar

Other
- Player of the Year: Paul Smith (Laragh United)

The 2019 Cavan Intermediate Football Championship was the 55th edition of Cavan GAA's premier Gaelic football tournament for intermediate graded clubs in County Cavan, Ireland. The tournament consists of 15 teams, with the winner representing Cavan in the Ulster Intermediate Club Football Championship.

The championship starts with a league stage and then progresses to a knock out stage.

Laragh United won the championship, beating Belturbet in the final.

== Team changes ==
The following teams have changed division since the 2018 championship season.

=== To Championship ===
Promoted from 2018 Cavan Junior Football Championship

- Drumlane - (Junior Champions)

Relegated from 2018 Cavan Senior Football Championship

- Ballinagh

Ramor United also entered a second string into the championship

=== From Championship ===
Promoted to 2019 Cavan Senior Football Championship

- Mullahoran (Intermediate Champions)

Relegated to 2019 Cavan Junior Football Championship

- Redhills

== League stage ==
All 15 teams enter the competition at this stage. A random draw determines which teams face each other in each of the four rounds. No team can meet each other twice in the group stage. The top eight teams go into a seeded draw for the Quarter-Finals while the bottom four teams will enter a Relegation Playoff.

| Pos | Team | Pld | W | L | D | PD | Pts |
|---|---|---|---|---|---|---|---|
| 1 | Belturbet | 4 | 4 | 0 | 0 | +22 | 8 |
| 2 | Ballinagh | 4 | 3 | 1 | 0 | +21 | 6 |
| 3 | Drumlane | 4 | 3 | 1 | 0 | +18 | 6 |
| 4 | Butlersbridge | 4 | 2 | 1 | 1 | +32 | 5 |
| 5 | Laragh United | 4 | 2 | 1 | 1 | +17 | 5 |
| 6 | Arva | 4 | 2 | 1 | 1 | +6 | 5 |
| 7 | Cuchulainns | 4 | 2 | 1 | 1 | +4 | 5 |
| 8 | Drumgoon | 4 | 2 | 2 | 0 | +4 | 4 |
| 9 | Cornafean | 4 | 2 | 2 | 0 | +1 | 4 |
| 10 | Ballyhaise | 4 | 2 | 2 | 0 | 0 | 4 |
| 11 | Ballymachugh | 4 | 1 | 3 | 0 | -4 | 2 |
| 12 | Bailieborough | 4 | 1 | 3 | 0 | -8 | 2 |
| 13 | Ramor United B | 4 | 1 | 3 | 0 | -27 | 2 |
| 14 | Killeshandra | 4 | 1 | 3 | 0 | -33 | 2 |
| 15 | Swanlinbar | 4 | 0 | 4 | 0 | -53 | 0 |

=== Round 1 ===
| 26 July 2019 Round 1 | Drumgoon | 1-16 – 2-12 | Laragh United | O'Raghallaigh Park |
| | | | | Referee: Conor Dourneen |

| 27 July 2019 Round 1 | Belturbet | 1-13 – 0-13 | Ballinagh | Páirc Emmet |
| | | | | Referee: James Clarke |

| 28 July 2019 Round 1 | Ramor United B | 0-9 – 5-11 | Butlersbridge | St. Matthew's Park |
| | | | | Referee: Ollie Donohoe |

| 28 July 2019 Round 1 | Drumlane | 3-19 – 0-12 | Swanlinbar | St Aidan's Park |
| | | | | Referee: Tony Gregory |

| 28 July 2019 Round 1 | Bailieborough | 2-7 – 2-12 | Ballyhaise | Hugh O'Reilly Memorial Park |
| | | | | Referee: Margaret Farrelly |

| 28 July 2019 Round 1 | Cuchulainns | 0-11 – 1-13 | Cornafean | St Matthew's Park |
| | | | | Referee: Padraig Sheridan |

| 28 July 2019 Round 1 | Arva | 0-10 – 1-12 | Killeshandra | Ballinagh GAA Grounds |
| | | | | Referee: Kieran McCarville |

=== Round 2 ===
| 2 August 2019 Round 2 | Killeshandra | 2-10 – 2-14 | Cornafean | Gowna GAA Grounds |
| | | | | Referee: Michael Lee |

| 2 August 2019 Round 2 | Bailieborough | 1-8 – 2-8 | Belturbet | Breffni Park |
| | | | | Referee: Barry McMenamin |

| 2 August 2019 Round 2 | Arva | 0-18 – 2-12 | Cuchulainns | Our Lady of Lourdes Park |
| | | | | Referee: Joe McQuillan |

| 3 August 2019 Round 2 | Laragh United | 0-13 – 0-13 | Butlersbridge | Annalee Park |
| | | | | Referee: Oliver Óg O'Reilly |

| 4 August 2019 Round 2 | Drumgoon | 1-8 – 2-9 | Ballyhaise | Hugh O'Reilly Memorial Park |
| | | | | Referee: Jim Giblin |

| 4 August 2019 Round 2 | Ballymachugh | 2-9 – 3-10 | Ramor United B | St. Bartholomew's Park |
| | | | | Referee: Harry Conaty |

| 4 August 2019 Round 2 | Drumlane | 2-11 – 2-14 | Ballinagh | Breffni Park |
| | | | | Referee: Martin Sexton |

=== Round 3 ===
| 16 August 2019 Round 3 | Belturbet | 2-17 – 0-8 | Swanlinbar | St Aidan's Park |
| | | | | Referee: James Clarke |

| 16 August 2019 Round 3 | Laragh United | 2-15 – 1-5 | Bailieborough | O'Raghallaigh Park |
| | | | | Referee: Kieran McCarville |

| 16 August 2019 Round 3 | Arva | 2-13 – 1-9 | Ballyhaise | Breffni Park |
| | | | | Referee: Conor Dourneen |

| 17 August 2019 Round 3 | Ballymachugh | 0-9 – 0-16 | Cuchulainns | Dolan Park |
| | | | | Referee: Ollie Donohoe |

| 17 August 2019 Round 3 | Drumgoon | 1-4 – 1-12 | Ballinagh | Breffni Park |
| | | | | Referee: Michael Lee |

| 18 August 2019 Round 3 | Butlersbridge | 2-18 – 0-5 | Killeshandra | Páirc Naomh Fionnán |
| | | | | Referee: Noel Mooney |

| 18 August 2019 Round 3 | Cornafean | 0-10 – 0-13 | Drumlane | First Ulster Park |
| | | | | Referee: Joe McQuillan |

=== Round 4 ===
| 23 August 2019 Round 4 | Ballymachugh | 2-15 – 4-11 | Drumlane | Our Lady of Lourdes Park |
| | | | | Referee: James Clarke |

| 23 August 2019 Round 4 | Belturbet | 3-5 – 1-10 | Ramor United B | Edwin Carolan Community Park |
| | | | | Referee: Barry McMenamin |

| 23 August 2019 Round 4 | Butlersbridge | 1-10 – 0-17 | Arva | St Aidan's Park |
| | | | | Referee: Padraig Sheridan |

| 24 August 2019 Round 4 | Ballyhaise | 1-14 – 0-19 | Cuchulainns | St. Matthew's Park |
| | | | | Referee: Tony Gregory |

| 24 August 2019 Round 4 | Swanlinbar | 1-7 – 2-17 | Bailieborough | St. Felim's Park |
| | | | | Referee: Stephen McKiernan |

| 24 August 2019 Round 4 | Laragh United | 0-19 – 2-8 | Cornafean | St. Matthew's Park |
| | | | | Referee: Martin Sexton |

| 25 August 2019 Round 4 | Drumgoon | 0-22 – 0-7 | Killeshandra | Páirc Emmet |
| | | | | Referee: Pat Clarke |

=== Round 5 ===
| 30 August 2019 Round 5 | Ballymachugh | 1-15 – 0-9 | Swanlinbar | Our Lady of Lourdes Park |
| | | | | Referee: John Power |

| 30 August 2019 Round 5 | Ramor United B | 1-6 – 2-16 | Ballinagh | Edwin Carolan Community Park |
| | | | | Referee: Paddy Clarke |

== Knock-out stage ==
Quarter-finals
Belturbet | 5-8
Drumgoon | 1-13
Drumlane | 0-10
Arva | 0-8
Butlersbridge | 0-14
Laragh United | 1-19
Ballinagh | 0-15
Cuchulainns | 1-13

Semi-finals
Belturbet | 1-14
Drumlane | 0-13
Laragh United | 2-17
Cuchulainns | 2-16

Final
Belturbet | 1-9
Laragh United | 2-16

=== Quarter-finals ===
| 6 September 2019 Quarter-final | Butlersbridge | 0-14 – 1-19 | Laragh United | Breffni Park |
| | | | | Referee: James Clarke |

| 7 September 2019 Quarter-final | Belturbet | 5-8 – 1-13 | Drumgoon | Breffni Park |
| | | | | Referee: Oliver Óg O'Reilly |

| 8 September 2019 Quarter-final | Drumlane | 0-10 – 0-8 | Arva | Breffni Park |
| | | | | Referee: Barry McMenamin |

| 13 September 2019 Quarter-final | Ballinagh | 0-15 – 1-13 | Cuchulainns | Breffni Park |
| | | | | Referee: Noel Mooney |

=== Semi-finals ===
| 21 September 2019 Semi-final | Belturbet | 1-14 – 0-13 | Drumlane | Breffni Park |
| | | Report | | Referee: Conor Dourneen |

| 22 September 2019 Semi-final | Laragh United | 2-17 – 2-16 | Cuchulainns | Breffni Park |
| | | | | Referee: Jim Giblin |

=== Final ===
| 6 October 2019 Final | Belturbet | 1-9 – 2-16 | Laragh United | Breffni Park |
| | Enda Henry 0-4 (0-4f), Jack O'Callaghan 1-0, Cormac Donohoe 0-2, Conal McGinley 0-2, Conor Vaughan 0-1 | Report | Liam McKenna 1-2, Pauric O'Reilly 1-2, Paul Smith 0-2, Ruairi Power 0-2, Jason Walsh 0-2, Oisin Carolan 0-2, Fergal O'Rourke 0-1 (0-1 '45), Sean Tierney 0-1, Ian Leddy 0-1, Jack McKenna 0-1 | Referee: James Clarke; Man of the Match: Jack McKenna (Laragh United) |

== Relegation play-offs ==
The bottom four teams in the league phase will play off against each other. The two winners will maintain their intermediate status for 2019, while the two losers will face off in a relegation final. The ultimate loser will be relegated to the 2020 Junior Championship.

| 7 September 2018 Relegation semi-final | Ramor United B | 1-12 – 4-11 | Killeshandra | St. Felim's Park |
| | | | | Referee: Joe McQuillan |

| 8 September 2018 Relegation semi-final | Bailieborough | 2-13 – 0-15 | Swanlinbar | Páirc Emmet |
| | | | | Referee: Pat Clarke |

| 22 September 2019 Relegation final | Ramor United B | 2-17 – 1-8 | Swanlinbar | Páirc Emmet |
| | | | | Referee: Michael Lee |
