= 2019 Cavan Senior Football Championship =

2019 Cavan SFC
Tournament details
- County: Cavan
- Province: Ulster
- Year: 2019
- Trophy: Oliver Plunkett Cup
- Sponsor: Hotel Kilmore
- Date: 26 July - 13 October 2019
- Teams: 12
- Defending champions: Castlerahan

Winners
- Champions: Castlerahan (2nd win)
- Manager: Donal Keogan
- Captain: Ronan Flanagan; David Wright
- Qualify for: 2019 Ulster Club SFC

Runners-up
- Runners-up: Ramor United
- Manager: Ray Cole
- Captain: Simon Cadden; Eoin Somerville

Promotion/Relegation
- Relegated team(s): Cootehill

Other
- Player of the Year: Oisin O'Connell (Castlerahan)

The 2019 Cavan Senior Football Championship was the 110th edition of Cavan GAA's premier gaelic football tournament for senior graded clubs in County Cavan, Ireland. The tournament consists of 12 teams, with the winner representing Cavan in the Ulster Senior Club Football Championship.

The championship starts with a league stage and then progresses to a knock out stage.

Castlerahan were the defending champions, having beaten Crosserlough in the previous years final.

Castlerahan won their second title in a row, defeating neighbours Ramor United in the final.

== Team changes ==
The following teams have changed division since the 2018 championship season.

=== To Championship ===
Promoted from 2018 Cavan Intermediate Football Championship

- Mullahoran - (Intermediate Champions)

=== From Championship ===
Relegated to 2019 Cavan Intermediate Football Championship

- Ballinagh

== League Stage ==
All 12 teams enter the competition at this stage. A random draw determines which teams face each other in each of the four rounds. No team can meet each other twice in the group stage. The top 8 teams go into a seeded draw for the quarter-finals while the bottom 3 teams will enter a Relegation Playoff. If teams are level on points and a place in the quarter-final is at stake, a Playoff will be conducted to determine who goes through.

Pos	Team	Pld	W	D	L	PF	PA	PD	Pts	Qualification or relegation
1	Castlerahan	4	3	1	0	70	53	+17	7	Advance to quarter-final
2	Kingscourt Stars	4	3	1	0	64	51	+13	7	Advance to quarter-final
3	Ramor United	4	3	0	1	62	57	+5	6	Advance to quarter-final
4	Crosserlough	4	3	0	1	80	51	+29	6	Advance to quarter-final
5	Lavey	4	2	1	1	74	68	+6	5	Advance to quarter-final
6	Gowna	4	2	0	2	75	53	+22	4	Advance to quarter-final
7	Cavan Gaels	4	2	0	2	78	72	+6	4	Advance to quarter-final
8	Killygarry	4	2	0	2	68	72	−4	4	Advance to quarter-final
9	Lacken Celtic	4	1	1	2	63	65	−2	3	
10	Shercock	4	1	0	3	50	61	−11	2	Advance to relegation play-offs
11	Mullahoran	4	0	0	4	40	67	−27	0	Advance to relegation play-offs
12	Cootehill	4	0	0	4	41	95	−54	0	Advance to relegation play-offs

Source: Cavan GAA

=== Round 1 ===
26 July 2019 Round 1	Mullahoran	0-11 – 0-13	Ramor United	Sheelin Park
				Referee: Packie Smith

2 August 2019 Round 1	Castlerahan	1-14 – 1-10	Killygarry	Joe Crowe Park
				Referee: Pat Clarke

3 August 2019 Round 1	Cavan Gaels	4-17 – 1-15	Lavey	St. Felim's Park
				Referee: Tony Gregory

3 August 2019 Round 1	Cootehill	2-6 – 2-12	Lacken	Athletic Grounds
				Referee: Margaret Farrelly

4 August 2019 Round 1	Crosserlough	4-8 – 1-10	Shercock	Lavey GAA Grounds
				Referee: James Clarke

4 August 2019 Round 1	Kingscourt Stars	0-12 – 0-9	Gowna	Dolan Park
				Referee: Conor Dourneen

=== Round 2 ===
9 August 2019 Round 2	Castlerahan	0-16 – 0-16	Lavey	Breffni Park
		Report		Referee: Conor Dourneen

9 August 2019 Round 2	Mullahoran	1-6 – 3-5	Shercock	Edwin Carolan Community Park
				Referee: Kieran McCarville

10 August 2019 Round 2	Kingscourt Stars	1-14 – 1-14	Lacken	St. Matthew's Park
				Referee: Chris McCaffrey

10 August 2019 Round 2	Cavan Gaels	0-9 – 2-15	Crosserlough	Breffni Park
		Report		Referee: Joe McQuillan

11 August 2019 Round 2	Gowna	4-13 – 0-3	Cootehill	Ballinagh GAA Grounds
				Referee: Pat Clarke

11 August 2019 Round 2	Ramor United	0-17 – 3-10	Killygarry	Lavey GAA Grounds
				Referee: Margaret Farrelly

=== Round 3 ===
23 August 2019 Round 3	Killygarry	0-15 – 2-15	Kingscourt Stars	Breffni Park
				Referee: Noel Mooney

24 August 2019 Round 3	Shercock	1-10 – 0-18	Castlerahan	Dolan Park
				Referee: Brendan Sweeney

24 August 2019 Round 3	Lacken	1-14 – 4-12	Gowna	Breffni Park
				Referee: Joe McQuillan

25 August 2019 Round 3	Lavey	1-14 – 0-11	Mullahoran	Dr. Plunkett Memorial Park
				Referee: John Emmo

25 August 2019 Round 3	Cootehill	1-11 – 3-20	Cavan Gaels	Annalee Park
				Referee: Oliver Óg O'Reilly

25 August 2019 Round 3	Ramor United	1-17 – 1-13	Crosserlough	Breffni Park
				Referee: Michael Lee

=== Round 4 ===
31 August 2019 Round 4	Lacken	0-11 – 0-12	Ramor United	Breffni Park
				Referee: Tony Gregory

31 August 2019 Round 4	Kingscourt Stars	2-8 – 1-7	Shercock	St. Anne's Park
				Referee: Michael Lee

31 August 2019 Round 4	Gowna	2-11 – 2-15	Killygarry	Páirc Emmet
				Referee: Kieran McCarville

31 August 2019 Round 4	Lavey	2-17 – 1-9	Cootehill	St. Felim's Park
				Referee: Padraig Sheridan

31 August 2019 Round 4	Mullahoran	1-6 – 4-11	Crosserlough	Ballinagh GAA Grounds
				Referee: Stephen McKiernan

31 August 2019 Round 4	Cavan Gaels	1-8 – 4-7	Castlerahan	St. Matthew's Park
				Referee: Margaret Farrelly

== Knock-Out Stage ==
Quarter-finals
Kingscourt Stars	0-7
Cavan Gaels	0-9
Castlerahan	1-7; 2-14 (R)
Killygarry	1-7; 0-5 (R)
Ramor United	1-15
Gowna	0-7
Crosserlough	3-19
Lavey	1-9

Semi-finals
Cavan Gaels	0-9
Castlerahan	1-11
Ramor United	2-8
Crosserlough	0-12

Final
Castlerahan	1-9
Ramor United	0-10

=== Quarter-finals ===
13 September 2019 Quarter-final	Ramor United	1-15 – 0-7	Gowna	Breffni Park
				Referee: Joe McQuillan

15 September 2019 Quarter-final	Kingscourt Stars	0-7 – 0-9	Cavan Gaels	Lavey GAA Grounds
				Referee: Kieran McCarville

15 September 2019 Quarter-final	Castlerahan	1-7 – 1-7	Killygarry	St. Matthew's Park
				Referee: Pat Clarke

15 September 2019 Quarter-final	Crosserlough	3-19 – 1-9	Lavey	Breffni Park
				Referee: Conor Dourneen

22 September 2019 Quarter-final replay	Killygarry	0-5 – 2-14	Castlerahan	Breffni Park
				Referee: Tony Gregory

=== Semi-finals ===
28 September 2019 Semi-final	Ramor United	2-8 – 0-12	Crosserlough	Breffni Park
				Referee: Noel Mooney

29 September 2019 Semi-final	Cavan Gaels	0-9 – 1-11	Castlerahan	Breffni Park
				Referee: Kieran McCarville

=== Final ===
13 October 2019
Final

Castlerahan	1-9 – 0-10	Ramor United
Oisin O'Connell 1-1, Paul Smith 0-1, Enda O'Connell 0-1, Oisin Kiernan 0-1, Fergal Flanagan 0-1, Cormac Daly 0-1, Cian Mackey 0-1, Shane O'Reilly (0-1f), Karl Cosgrove 0-1	Report	James Brady 0-4 (0-2f), Ado Cole 0-2, Mark Magee 0-1, Adam O'Connell 0-1, Killian Maguire 0-1, Cathal Maguire 0-1

Breffni Park
Attendance: 7,705
Referee: Joe McQuillan

== Relegation play-offs ==
The 3 bottom placed teams the league phase will enter the relegation play-offs. The 10th and 11th placed teams from the league phase will face each other in the Relegation Semi-Final, with the winner maintaining their senior status for 2020. The loser will face the 12th placed team with the loser being relegated to the 2020 Intermediate Championship.

15 September 2019 Relegation Semi-final	Shercock	0-14 – 2-11	Mullahoran	Dolan Park
				Referee: Paddy Clarke

28 September 2019 Relegation Final	Shercock	2-15 – 3-9	Cootehill	Breffni Park
				Referee: James Clarke
