= 2013 Cavan Under-21 Football Championship =

Cavan u21 Football Championship
- Irish: An Cabhán
- Founded: 1975
- Title holders: Cavan Gaels (4th title)
- Most titles: Ramor United (5 titles)

The Cavan Under-21 Football Championship is an annual Gaelic Athletic Association club competition between Cavan Under-21 Gaelic football clubs. It was first competed for in 1975. Ramor United have won the most titles, having been victorious 5 times. 3 of these titles came when they amalgamated with Munterconnaught. The 2012 Under-21 football champions were Cavan Gaels.

== Division 1 ==
=== Preliminary round ===
17 November 2013
2.00pm
Preliminary round

Eire Og Celtic	3-7 - 1-11	Castlerahan

Hugh O Reilly Memorial Park, Cavan
Referee: Packie Smith, (Cavan)

23 November 2013
2.00pm
Preliminary round

Southern Gaels	2-9 - 1-11	Ramor United

Lacken GAA Grounds, Cavan
Referee: Thomas Doonan, (Cavan)

=== Quarter-finals ===
24 November 2013
12.00pm
Quarter Final

Assan Gaels	0-15 - 2-7	Kingscourt Stars

Lavey GAA Grounds, Cavan
Referee: Chris McCaffrey, (Cavan)

1 December 2013
1.00pm
Quarter Final

St. Felim's	1-8 - 2-13	West Cavan Gaels

Ballinagh GAA Grounds, Cavan
Referee: Kieran McCarville, (Cavan)

1 December 2013
1.00pm
Quarter Final

Eire Og Celtic	1-6 - 2-11	Cavan Gaels

O'Boyle Park, Cavan
Referee: Gerry Sheridan, (Cavan)

1 December 2013
1.00pm
Quarter Final

Annalee Gaels	2-10 - 1-8	Southern Gaels

Ballyhaise, Cavan
Referee: Ollie Donohoe, (Cavan)

=== Semi-final ===
2013
1.30pm
Semi Final

Assan Gaels	4-18 - 0-10	West Cavan Gaels

O'Connell Park, Cavan
Referee: Martin Sexton, (Cavan)

14 December 2013
7.30pm
Semi Final

Cavan Gaels	1-13 - 2-4	Annalee Gaels

3G, Breffni Park, Cavan
Referee: Mg Brady, (Cavan)

=== Final ===
22 December 2013
2.30pm
Final

Assan Gaels	0-12 - 0-11	Cavan Gaels

3G Pitch, Kingspan Breffni Park, Cavan
Referee: Brendan Sweeney, (Cavan)

== Division 2 ==
=== Preliminary round ===
24 November 2013
3.00pm
Preliminary round

Crosserlough	2-22 - 0-4	Knockbride

Dr. Plunkett Memorial Park, Cavan
Referee: Declan McCabe, (Cavan)

24 November 2013
12.00pm
Preliminary round

Bailieboro Shamrocks	3-16 - 1-9	Erne Gaels

St. Anne's Park, Cavan
Referee: Michael Lee, (Cavan)

24 November 2013
12.00pm
Preliminary round

Killygarry	0-8 - 1-14	St. Finbarr's

Crubany Athletic Grounds, Cavan
Referee: (Cavan)

1 December 2013
1.00pm
Preliminary round

Blackwater Gaels	0-16 - 1-19	Ballymachugh

St Bartholomew Park, Cavan
Referee: Pat Clarke, (Cavan)

=== Quarter-finals ===
1 December 2013
1.00pm
Quarter Final

St. Joseph's	7-12 - 1-9	Drumalee

Packie Devlin Park, Cavan
Referee: Conor Dourneen, (Cavan)

1 December 2013
1.00pm
Quarter Final

Laragh United	2-11 - 0-9	Crosserlough

P.J. Duke Park, Cavan
Referee: Michael Lee, (Cavan)

7 December 2013
2.00pm
Quarter Final

St. Finbarr's	4-9 - 0-17	Shercock

Ruthluden Park, Cavan
Referee: Margaret Farrelly, (Cavan)

8 December 2013
1.00pm
Quarter Final

Bailieboro Shamrocks	1-13 - 2-4	Ballymachugh

St. Anne's Park, Cavan
Referee: Kieran McCarville, (Cavan)

=== Semi-final ===
8 December 2013
1.00pm
Semi Final

St. Joseph's	3-14 - 1-5	Laragh United

St. Aidan's Park, Cavan
Referee: Raymond Kelly, (Cavan)

15 December 2013
2pm
Semi Final

St. Finbarr's	1-5 - 1-8	Bailieboro Shamrocks

O'Boyle Park, Cavan
Referee: Martin Brady, (Cavan)

=== Final ===
Final

St. Joseph's	2-8 - 0-5	Bailieboro Shamrocks
	,

Kingspan Breffni Park, Cavan
Referee: Thomas Doonan,(Cavan)
