= James Smith (Gaelic footballer) =

Gaelic footballer from County Cavan, Ireland

Personal information
- Native name: Séamus Mac Gabhann (Irish)
- Nickname: The Miller
- Born: 27 April 1999 (age 27)

Sport
- Sport: Gaelic football
- Position: Midfield/Full Forward
Club
- Years: Club
- Crosserlough
Club titles
- Cavan titles: 1
Inter-county
- Years: County
- 2019–: Cavan
Inter-county titles
- Ulster titles: 1

James Smith (born 27 April 1999) is an Irish Gaelic footballer who plays for the Crosserlough club and the Cavan county team.

== Playing career ==
=== Club ===
Smith has played with the Crosserlough at all age levels, and later joined the Crosserlough senior team. In 2018, and they reached the final of the Cavan Senior Football Championship. On 21 October 2018, Smith lined out at midfield in his first county final, where Crosserlough faced Castlerahan. Smith scored a goal to put Crosserlough six ahead in the second half, before Castlerahan came back to win by a point.

Crosserlough reached the county final again in 2020, facing Kingscourt Stars on 26 September. Smith scored a point as the game ended in a draw. The replay took place on 3 October, with Smith scoring three points from midfield and being named man of the match as Crosserlough secured their first senior championship since 1972.

=== Inter-county ===
==== Minor and under-20 ====
On 16 July 2017, Smith was in midfield as the Cavan minor team faced Derry in the Ulster final. Smith scored a first half goal but Derry came out seven-point winners. Cavan then beat Connacht champions Galway to set up an All-Ireland semi-final against Kerry. On 20 August 2017, Smith started in midfield and scored 1-2 as Cavan lost to a David Clifford-inspired Kerry.

Smith also represented Cavan at under-20 level, but didn't have any success at this grade.

==== Senior ====
Smith joined the senior squad in 2019, and made his National League debut in a loss to Monaghan on 16 March.

On 31 October 2020, Smith made his championship debut against Monaghan in the Ulster preliminary round, scoring a point as Cavan came out on top after extra-time. On 22 November, Smith started his first Ulster final, with Cavan coming up against Donegal. Smith scored two points as Cavan won their first Ulster title since 1997. On 5 December, Smith scored 2 points in the All-Ireland semi-final loss to Dublin.

On 2 April 2022, Smith started the National League Division 4 final against Tipperary, scoring a point in the 2–10 to 0–15 victory.

On 9 July, Smith started the inaugural Tailteann Cup Final against Westmeath. Smith scored a point but Westmeath went home with the cup after a four-point win.

== Honours ==
Cavan

- Ulster Senior Football Championship (1): 2020
- National Football League Division 4 (1): 2022

Crosserlough

- Cavan Senior Football Championship (1): 2020
