= Paddy Lynch =

Cavan Gaelic footballer

Patrick Lynch
Personal information
- Native name: Pádraig Ó Loingsigh (Irish)
- Born: 31 March 2000 (age 26)

Sport
- Sport: Gaelic Football
- Position: Full Forward
Club
- Years: Club
- 2018–: Crosserlough
Club titles
- Cavan titles: 1
Inter-county
- Years: County
- 2021–: Cavan

Patrick Lynch (born 31 March 2000) is an Irish Gaelic footballer who plays for the Crosserlough club and the Cavan county team.

== Playing career ==
=== Club ===
Lynch joined the Crosserlough senior team in 2018, and they reached the final of the Cavan Senior Football Championship in his first year. On 21 October 2018, Lynch started at corner forward in his first county final, where Crosserlough faced Castlerahan. Lynch scored two points as Crosserlough led by six at one stage, before Castlerahan came back to win by a point.

Crosserlough reached the county final again in 2020, facing Kingscourt Stars on 26 September. Lined out at full forward, Lynch scored six points as the game ended in a draw. The replay took place on 3 October, with Lynch scoring five points as Crosserlough secured their first senior championship since 1972.

=== Inter-county ===
==== Minor and under-20 ====
On 16 July 2017, Lynch was at full forward as the Cavan minor team faced Derry in the Ulster final. Lynch scored one point but Derry were seven-point winners. Cavan then beat Connacht champions Galway to set up an All-Ireland semi-final against Kerry. On 20 August 2017, Lynch started at full forward as Cavan lost to a David Clifford-inspired Kerry.

On 30 June 2019, Lynch scored nine points for the Cavan under-20 team as they defeated Monaghan in the Ulster quarter-final. On 6 July, Lynch scored five points in the semi-final loss to Tyrone.

Lynch was eligible for the under-20 grade again in 2020. On 24 February 2020, Cavan faced Down in the Ulster quarter-final. Lynch scored two points as Cavan lost by six.

==== Senior ====
Lynch joined the Cavan senior squad ahead of the 2021 season. On 16 May 2021, Lynch scored four points on his National League debut in a loss to Fermanagh. On 12 June 2021, Lynch scored 3 points as Wicklow relegated Cavan to Division 4 for the first time in their history.

On 2 April 2022, Lynch was at full forward as Cavan faced Tipperary in the National League Division 4 final at Croke Park. Lynch scored 2–3 in a man of the match performance as Cavan were winners on a 2–10 to 0-15 scoreline.

On 23 April 2022, Lynch made his championship debut, scoring 8 points against Antrim in the Ulster quarter-final. On 8 May, Lynch scored 0-6 in the semi-final loss to Donegal. On 9 July, Lynch was at full forward for the Tailteann Cup Final against Westmeath. Lynch scored three points as Westmeath came out four-point winners.

== Honours ==
Cavan

- National Football League Division 4 (1): 2022

Crosserlough

- Cavan Senior Football Championship (1): 2020
