= 2018 Cavan Senior Football Championship =

2018 Cavan SFC
Tournament details
- County: Cavan
- Province: Ulster
- Year: 2018
- Trophy: Oliver Plunkett Cup
- Sponsor: Hotel Kilmore
- Date: 10 August - 21 October 2018
- Teams: 12
- Defending champions: Cavan Gaels

Winners
- Champions: Castlerahan (1st win)
- Manager: Donal Keogan
- Captain: Ronan Flanagan
- Qualify for: 2018 Ulster Club SFC

Runners-up
- Runners-up: Crosserlough
- Manager: Daragh McCarthy
- Captain: Dara McVeety

Promotion/Relegation
- Relegated team(s): Ballinagh

Other
- Player of the Year: Paul Smith (Castlerahan)

The 2018 Cavan Senior Football Championship was the 110th edition of Cavan GAA's premier gaelic football tournament for senior graded clubs in County Cavan, Ireland. The tournament consists of 12 teams, with the winner representing Cavan in the Ulster Senior Club Football Championship.

The championship starts with a league stage and then progresses to a knock out stage. The draw for the group stages of the championship were made on 30 April 2018.

Due to reconstruction of the stadium in 2018, Breffni Park was not used as a venue for any matches during this season's championship, except for the final.

Cavan Gaels were the defending champions, but they lost to Gowna at the quarter-final stage.

Castlerahan won their first title, defeating Crosserlough in the final.

== Team changes ==
The following teams have changed division since the 2017 championship season.

=== To Championship ===
Promoted from 2017 Cavan Intermediate Football Championship

- Shercock - (Intermediate Champions)

=== From Championship ===
Relegated to 2018 Cavan Intermediate Football Championship

- Arva
- Cuchulainns
- Mullahoran

== League stage ==
All 12 teams enter the competition at this stage. A random draw determines which teams face each other in each of the four rounds. No team can meet each other twice in the group stage. The top 8 teams go into a seeded draw for the quarter-finals while the bottom 4 teams will enter a Relegation Playoff. If teams are level on points and a place in the quarter-final is at stake, a Playoff will be conducted to determine who goes through.

Pos	Team	Pld	W	D	L	PF	PA	PD	Pts	Qualification or relegation
1	Crosserlough	4	3	0	1	83	61	+22	6	Advance to quarter-final
2	Castlerahan	4	2	1	1	75	67	+8	5	Advance to quarter-final
3	Gowna	4	1	3	0	60	52	+8	5	Advance to quarter-final
4	Lavey	4	2	1	1	63	56	+7	5	Advance to quarter-final
5	Lacken Celtic	4	2	1	1	49	67	−18	5	Advance to quarter-final
6	Cavan Gaels	4	1	2	1	79	56	+23	4	Advance to quarter-final
7	Kingscourt Stars	4	2	0	2	59	56	+3	4	Advance to quarter-final
8	Ramor United	4	1	2	1	68	69	−1	4	Advance to quarter-final
9	Cootehill	4	2	0	2	57	61	−4	4	Advance to relegation play-offs
10	Killygarry	4	1	1	2	68	74	−6	3	Advance to relegation play-offs
11	Ballinagh	4	1	0	3	70	88	−18	2	Advance to relegation play-offs
12	Shercock	4	0	1	3	39	63	−24	1	Advance to relegation play-offs

Source: Cavan GAA

=== Round 1 ===
10 August 2018 Round 1	Killygarry	3-11 – 1-16	Cavan Gaels	Joe Crowe Park
				Referee: Joe McQuillan

11 August 2018 Round 1	Castlerahan	2-14 – 1-11	Cootehill	Dolan Park
				Referee: Conor Dourneen

11 August 2018 Round 1	Gowna	3-13 – 0-14	Ballinagh	Páirc Naomh Fionnán
				Referee: Michael Lee

12 August 2018 Round 1	Crosserlough	3-18 – 1-10	Shercock	Lavey GAA Grounds
				Referee: John Emmo

12 August 2018 Round 1	Kingscourt Stars	3-8 – 0-14	Lavey	St. Anne's Park
				Referee: Padraig Sheridan

12 August 2018 Round 1	Ramor United	2-12 – 3-9	Lacken	Our Lady of Lourdes Park
				Referee: Margeret Farrelly

=== Round 2 ===
17 August 2018 Round 2	Cavan Gaels	1-12 – 1-12	Castlerahan	Lavey GAA Grounds
				Referee: Conor Dourneen

18 August 2018 Round 2	Shercock	0-9 – 0-9	Gowna	Annalee Park
				Referee: Pat Clarke

18 August 2018 Round 2	Lavey	2-17 – 3-7	Ballinagh	St. Felim's Park
				Referee: Chris McCaffrey

18 August 2018 Round 2	Ramor United	0-17 – 1-11	Killygarry	St. Matthew's Park
				Referee: Brendan Sweeney

19 August 2018 Round 2	Cootehill	1-12 – 1-11	Crosserlough	Athletic Grounds
				Referee: Packie Smith

19 August 2018 Round 2	Kingscourt Stars	2-8 – 1-14	Lacken	Dolan Park
				Referee: Padraig Sheridan

=== Round 3 ===
31 August 2018 Round 3	Kingscourt Stars	2-9 – 0-8	Shercock	Edwin Carolan Community Park
				Referee: Gerry Sheridan

1 September 2018 Round 3	Cootehill	0-4 – 0-7	Lacken	Annalee Park
				Referee: Chris McCaffrey

1 September 2018 Round 3	Castlerahan	2-16 – 3-9	Ramor United	St. Matthew's Park
				Referee: Joe McQuillan

1 September 2018 Round 3	Crosserlough	3-16 – 3-11	Ballinagh	Sheelin Park
				Referee: James Clarke

1 September 2018 Round 3	Cavan Gaels	1-11 – 0-14	Gowna	Joe Crowe Park
				Referee: Kieran McCarville

1 September 2018 Round 3	Lavey	1-11 – 1-11	Killygarry	Dolan Park
				Referee: Jim Giblin

=== Round 4 ===
9 September 2018 Round 4	Killygarry	2-14 – 5-9	Cootehill	Páirc Emmet
				Referee: Margaret Farrelly

9 September 2018 Round 4	Gowna	1-12 – 1-12	Ramor United	St. Matthew's Park
				Referee: Martin Sexton

9 September 2018 Round 4	Kingscourt Stars	0-13 – 2-11	Crosserlough	St. Anne's Park
				Referee: Ollie Donohoe

9 September 2018 Round 4	Shercock	0-9 – 0-12	Lavey	P. J. Duke Park
				Referee: Michael Lee

9 September 2018 Round 4	Cavan Gaels	4-19 – 0-7	Lacken	Páirc Naomh Fionnán
				Referee: Joe McQuillan

9 September 2018 Round 4	Castlerahan	0-18 – 3-11	Ballinagh	Sheelin Park
				Referee: Harry Conaty

== Knock-Out Stage ==
Quarter-finals
Lavey	0-10; 2-12 (R)
Lacken	0-10; 1-13 (R)
Castlerahan	0-12
Kingscourt Stars	0-7
Gowna	2-13
Cavan Gaels	0-15
Crosserlough	2-17
Ramor United	2-14

Semi-finals
Lavey	0-11; 1-16 (R)
Castlerahan	0-11; 1-19 (R)
Gowna	1-8; 1-6 (R)
Crosserlough	0-11; 0-11 (R)

Final
Castlerahan	2-11
Crosserlough	1-13

=== Quarter-finals ===
15 September 2018 Quarter-final	Lavey	0-10 – 0-10	Lacken	Athletic Grounds
				Referee: Padraig Sheridan

15 September 2018 Quarter-final	Castlerahan	0-12 – 0-7	Kingscourt Stars	Edwin Carolan Community Park
				Referee: Kieran McCarville

16 September 2018 Quarter-final	Gowna	2-13 – 0-15	Cavan Gaels	Joe Crowe Park
				Referee: James Clarke

16 September 2018 Quarter-final	Crosserlough	2-17 – 2-14	Ramor United	St. Matthew's Park
				Referee: Conor Dourneen

23 September 2018 Quarter-final replay	Lacken	1-13 – 2-12	Lavey	St. Matthew's Park
				Referee: Joe McQuillan

=== Semi-finals ===
6 October 2018 Semi-final	Gowna	1-8 – 0-11	Crosserlough	O'Raghallaigh Park
				Referee: Kieran McCarville

7 October 2018 Semi-final	Lavey	0-12 – 0-12	Castlerahan	O'Raghallaigh Park
				Referee: Oliver Óg O'Reilly

13 October 2018 Semi-final replay	Crosserlough	0-11 – 1-6	Gowna	Hugh O'Reilly Memorial Park
				Referee: Joe McQuillan

13 October 2018 Semi-final replay	Lavey	1-16 – 1-19	Castlerahan	O'Raghallaigh Park
				Referee: Gerry Sheridan

=== Final ===
21 October 2018
Final

Castlerahan	2-11 – 1-13	Crosserlough
Oisin O'Connell 1-3, Sean Brady 1-1, Cian Mackey 0-4 (0-4f), Enda Flanagan 0-3	Report	Pierce Smith 0-5 (0-2f), James Smith 1-0, Patrick Lynch 0-2 (0-1 45), Stephen Smith 0-2, Mark Stuart 0-2, Darren Gaffney 0-1, Paul McEvoy 0-1

Breffni Park
Attendance: 8,469
Referee: Conor Dourneen

== Relegation play-offs ==
The 4 bottom placed teams the league phase will play off against each other. The 2 winners will maintain their senior status for 2019 while the 2 losers will face off in a Relegation-Final. The ultimate loser will be relegated to the 2019 Intermediate Championship.

21 September 2018 Relegation Semi-final	Cootehill	1-8 – 1-9	Shercock	O'Raghallaigh Park
				Referee: Joey Curley

23 September 2018 Relegation Semi-final	Killygarry	1-20 – 1-8	Ballinagh	St. Felim's Park
				Referee: Pat Clarke

29 September 2018 Relegation Final	Cootehill	2-15 – 2-10	Ballinagh	St. Felim's Park
				Referee: Margaret Farrelly
