= Andy McCabe =

Cavan Gaelic footballer (1945–2021)

Personal information
- Native name: Aindriú Mac Cába (Irish)
- Born: 1945 Kilnaleck, County Cavan, Ireland
- Died: 4 December 2021 (aged 76) Kingscourt, County Cavan, Ireland
- Occupation: Bread salesman
- Height: 5 ft 10 in (178 cm)

Sport
- Sport: Gaelic football
- Position: Right corner-back
Club
- Years: Club
- Crosserlough
Club titles
- Cavan titles: 7
Inter-county
- Years: County
- 1966–1975: Cavan
Inter-county titles
- Ulster titles: 2
- All-Irelands: 0
- NFL: 0
- All Stars: 0

Andrew O. McCabe (1945 – 4 December 2021) was an Irish Gaelic footballer who played at club level with Crosserlough and at inter-county level with the Cavan senior football team. He usually lined out as a defender.

== Career ==
McCabe first played Gaelic football with the Crosserlough club. He captained the club's minor team to championship success in 1963, the senior team to league victory in 1964 and two years later in 1966 he captained the Crosserlough senior team to the first of their seven-in-a-row run of championship victories. McCabe joined the Cavan senior football team during the 1966-67 National League, having spent a number of seasons with the Cavan junior team. He won Ulster Championship medals in 1967 and again in 1969 as Cavan defeated Down on both occasions. McCabe's displays for Cavan earned him a call up to the Ulster panel and he was a key player for a number of years, winning Railway Cup medals in 1970 and 1971.

== Death ==
McCabe died on 4 December 2021.

== Honours ==
Crosserlough

- Cavan Senior Football Championship: 1966 (c), 1967, 1968, 1969, 1970, 1971, 1972

Cavan

- Ulster Senior Football Championship: 1967, 1969

Ulster

- Railway Cup: 1970, 1971
