= Martin Reilly =

Cavan Gaelic footballer

Personal information
- Native name: Máirtín Ó Raghallaigh (Irish)
- Born: 3 May 1987 (age 39) Cavan, Ireland
- Occupation: Engineer
- Height: 5 ft 11 in (180 cm)

Sport
- Sport: Gaelic football
- Position: Forward
Club
- Years: Club
- Killygarry
College
- Years: College
- DIT
College titles
- Sigerson titles: 1
Inter-county
- Years: County
- 2007–: Cavan
Inter-county titles
- Ulster titles: 1

Martin Reilly (born 3 May 1987) is an Irish Gaelic footballer who plays for the Killygarry club and the Cavan county team.

== Association football ==
A talented Association football player, Reilly was signed by Burnley F.C. in 2004. He spent two years at the club and released at the end of the 2005–06 season after making no first team appearances. Reilly is also a former Republic of Ireland under-18 international. He played as a left-back.

== Gaelic football ==
=== Club ===
After returning home from Burnley, Reilly decided to return to Gaelic football with his local club Killygarry.

Killygarry reached their first county final in 51 years in 2022, facing Gowna on 16 October. Reilly scored a lobbed goal in the first half, but Gowna ran out seven-point winners.

=== University ===
On 28 February 2009, Reilly was at wing forward as DIT faced Cork IT in the Sigerson Cup final. Reilly scored one point as DIT suffered a five-point loss.

On 23 February 2013, Reilly played in his second Sigerson final, with DIT facing UCC in the decider. DIT claimed their first Sigerson title after a dominant display.

=== Inter-county ===
On 7 July 2007, Reilly made his senior championship debut for Cavan in a qualifier loss to Mayo.

On 4 August 2013, Reilly started in his first All-Ireland quarter-final against Kerry. Reilly scored a point from a 45 as Cavan lost by six points.

On 26 April 2014, Cavan faced Roscommon in the National League Division 3 final, and Reilly scored 3 points in the narrow defeat.

On 3 April 2016, Reilly was at wing forward against Galway in the National League as Cavan earned promotion to the top flight for the first time in 15 years. On 24 April, Reilly scored a point in the Division 2 Final against Tyrone, with Cavan losing by five points.

Cavan met Roscommon once again in the National League Division 2 Final on 1 April 2018. Reilly scored a goal from a first half penalty as Cavan suffered a 4–16 to 4–12 loss.

In 2019, Reilly lined out at wing back in his first Ulster Final, with Cavan facing Donegal on 23 June. Two late goals couldn't stop Cavan from falling to a five-point defeat.

On 22 November 2020, Reilly played in his second Ulster Final as Cavan met Donegal for the second year in a row. Reilly scored a point as Cavan claimed their first Ulster title since 1997. On 5 December, Reilly scored 3 points as Cavan exited the championship to Dublin at the semi-final stage. Reilly received his first All-Star nomination at the end of the season.

On 9 July 2022, Reilly started on the bench as Cavan took on Westmeath in the inaugural Tailteann Cup decider at Croke Park. Reilly was introduced as a late substitute in the four-point loss.

== Honours ==
Cavan

- Ulster Senior Football Championship (1): 2020
- National Football League Division 4 (1): 2022

DIT

- Sigerson Cup (1): 2013

Individual

- Irish News Ulster All-Star (1): 2020
- GAA/GPA Footballer of the Month (1): May 2019
