= Mark McKeever (Gaelic footballer) =

Irish Gaelic footballer

Personal information
- Native name: Marcas Mac Íomhar (Irish)
- Born: 11 February 1984 (age 42)
- Occupation: Postman
- Height: 5 ft 11 in (180 cm)

Sport
- Sport: Gaelic football
- Position: Half back/half forward
Club
- Years: Club
- Gowna
Club titles
- Cavan titles: 4
Inter-county
- Years: County
- 2003–2015: Cavan

Mark McKeever (born 11 February 1984) in an Irish Gaelic footballer who plays for Gowna and was a member of the Cavan county team from 2003 to 2015.

== Playing career ==
McKeever was selected for the Irish under-17 International Rules Series squad in 2001, and was named Ireland's player of the series.

=== Club ===
McKeever won his first senior championship as a 15 year-old in 1999 as a member of the panel, and played in the winning finals of 2000 and 2002. In this time Gowna also lost finals in 2001 and 2007.

It would be fourteen years before Gowna reached another county final, facing Ramor United in the 2021 final. Ramor came out on top after a replay. McKeever and Gowna returned to the final in 2022, and at the age of 38 McKeever won his fourth senior championship with defeat of Killygarry.

=== Inter-county ===
McKeever made his Cavan senior debut as a 19 year-old in 2003, scoring a point against Antrim in the Ulster championship. McKeever played in the Ulster Under-21 finals of 2002 and 2005, losing to Tyrone and Down respectively. McKeever played with Cavan for 13 years, but never won a medal with the team.

McKeever retired from inter-county football at the end of the 2015 season.

== Honours ==
Gowna

- Cavan Senior Football Championship (4): 1999, 2000, 2002, 2022

Sporting positions
Preceded by Anthony Forde	Cavan Senior Football Captain; 2007–2008	Succeeded by Ronan Flanagan
