= Cian Madden =

Irish Gaelic footballer

Personal information
- Native name: Cian Ó Madáin (Irish)
- Born: 29 October 1999 (age 27)

Sport
- Sport: Gaelic Football
- Position: Wing forward
Club
- Years: Club
- Gowna
Club titles
- Cavan titles: 2
Inter-county
- Years: County
- 2022–: Cavan
Inter-county titles
- Ulster titles: 0

Cian Madden (born 29 October 1999) in an Irish Gaelic footballer who plays as a wing forward for Gowna and the Cavan county team.

== Playing career ==
=== Club ===
Brady joined the Gowna club and later progressed to the club's senior team. In 2021, Gowna reached the final of the Cavan Senior Football Championship for the first time since 2007, and faced Ramor United on 7 November. Madden scored 3 points in a low-scoring draw. Madden started the replay seven days later, scoring four frees as a strong start led Ramor to the title.

Gowna returned to the final the next year, where they faced Killygarry on 16 October. Madden scored five points as Gowna claimed their first title in 20 years, and was also named man of the match. Madden scored three points in the Ulster quarter-final against Enniskillen Gaels as the match ended in a draw. Madden had his penalty saved in the shoot-out as Enniskillen progressed to the semi-final. Gowna played in their third successive county final in 2023. Madden scored three points as Gowna defended their title with a seventeen-point win over Kingscourt Stars.

=== Inter-county ===
==== Minor and under-20 ====
On 16 July 2017, Madden was at centre forward as the Cavan minor team faced Derry in the Ulster final. Madden scored three points but Derry ran out seven-point winners. Madden scored 4 points against Connacht champions Galway as Cavan set up an All-Ireland semi-final against Kerry. The semi-final took place on 20 August, Madden scored a point as Cavan lost out to a David Clifford-inspired Kerry.

Madden also represented Cavan at under-20 level, but Cavan did not have any success at this time.

==== Senior ====
Madden joined the Cavan senior panel ahead of the 2022 season, and made his National League debut as a substitute in a win over Leitrim. Cavan faced Tipperary in the National League Division 4 final at Croke Park on 2 April 2022. Madden started the game and scored a point in the 2–10 to 0–15 victory. Madden made his championship debut on 23 April, starting in the Ulster quarter-final win over Antrim. On 9 July, Madden was at corner forward as Cavan took on Westmeath in the inaugural Tailteann Cup final at Croke Park. Westmeath won the match by 2–14 to 1–13.

Cavan played in their second successive league final in 2023, facing Fermanagh in the Division 3 final. Madden played the full game as Cavan were six-point winners.

== Honours ==
Cavan

- National Football League Division 3: 2023
- National Football League Division 4: 2022

Gowna

- Cavan Senior Football Championship: 2022, 2023
