= Conor Madden =

Cavan Gaelic footballer

Personal information
- Native name: Conchúr Ó Madáin (Irish)
- Born: 1994 (age 31–32)

Sport
- Sport: Gaelic Football
- Position: Full Forward
Club
- Years: Club
- Gowna
Club titles
- Cavan titles: 1
Inter-county
- Years: County
- 2017–: Cavan
Inter-county titles
- Ulster titles: 1

Conor Madden (born 1994) is an Irish Gaelic footballer who plays for Gowna and the Cavan county team.

== Playing career ==
=== Club ===
Madden joined the Gowna club and later progressed to the club's senior team.

On 7 November 2021, Madden started his first county final as Gowna faced Ramor United. A low-scoring game ended in a draw. Madden scored 2 points in the replay seven days later, but a poor start from Gowna was crucial as Ramor secured a four-point win.

Gowna returned to the final the next year, where they faced Killygarry on 16 October. Madden was at full forward as Gowna claimed their first title since 2002.

=== Inter-county ===
==== Minor and under-21 ====
Madden joined the Cavan under-21 side in 2013, On 10 April, Cavan faced Donegal in the Ulster Final. Madden came on as a substitute in the 0–13 to 1-6 win. On 20 April, Madden scored a point in the All-Ireland semi-final against Cork, where Cavan suffered a one-point defeat.

In 2014, Cavan beat Donegal in the Ulster Final again, but Madden didn't feature in the final through injury.

Madden's last underage game for Cavan came in 2015 in a first round loss to Donegal.

==== Senior ====
Madden joined the Cavan senior panel in 2017. On 11 June, Madden made his championship debut in an Ulster quarter-final loss to Monaghan.

On 25 March 2018, Madden kicked a 75th minute winner against Tipperary in the National League to send Cavan up to Division 1. On 1 April, Madden was on the bench for the Division 2 Final against Roscommon. Madden came on as a second-half substitute in the 4–16 to 4–12 loss.

On 23 June 2019, Madden was on the bench for the Ulster final against Donegal. Madden was brought on at half time, scoring 1-1 but it wasn't enough as Donegal ran out five-point winners.

On 15 November 2020, Madden started the Ulster semi-final against Down on the bench. Madden was brought on at half time, and scored 3 points as he led Cavan's comeback to win by a point. On 22 November, Madden was on the bench once again Ulster final against Donegal. Madden was brought on twice as a blood sub, before the substitution was made permanent. Madden was given a black card, and scored 1-2, including a stoppage time goal as Cavan claimed their first Ulster title in 23 years. On 5 December, Madden started the All-Ireland semi-final, scoring one point in the loss to Dublin.

Madden was on the bench for the National League Division 4 final against Tipperary on 2 April 2022. Madden came on as a second half substitute in the 2–10 to 0–15 victory. On 9 July, Madden started the inaugural Tailteann Cup Final against Westmeath on the bench. Madden was brought on late in the game, and had a stoppage time goal chance blocked, before Westmeath came out on top.

== Honours ==
Cavan

- Ulster Senior Football Championship (1): 2020
- National Football League Division 4 (1): 2022
- Ulster Under-21 Football Championship (2): 2013, 2014

Gowna

- Cavan Senior Football Championship (1): 2022

Individual

- Irish News Ulster All-Star (1): 2020
