= Conor Brady (Gaelic footballer) =

Cavan Gaelic footballer

Personal information
- Native name: Conchúr Ó Brádaigh (Irish)
- Born: 4 June 1998 (age 28)

Sport
- Sport: Gaelic football
- Position: Left half back
Club
- Years: Club
- Gowna
Club titles
- Cavan titles: 1
Inter-county
- Years: County
- 2018–: Cavan
Inter-county titles
- Ulster titles: 1

Conor Brady (born 4 June 1998) in an Irish Gaelic footballer who plays for the Gowna club and the Cavan county team.

== Playing career ==
=== Club ===
Brady joined the Gowna club and later progressed to the club's senior team.

On 7 November 2021, Brady started his first county final as Gowna faced Ramor United. A low-scoring game ended in a draw. Brady started the replay seven days later, a strong start from Ramor led to an eventual four-point win.

Gowna returned to the final the next year, where they faced Killygarry on 16 October. Brady scored two points and Gowna claimed their first county championship since 2002.

=== Inter-county ===
==== Minor and under-20 ====
On 19 July 2015, Brady was at midfield as the Cavan minor team faced Derry in the Ulster final. Derry came out on top on a 1-11 to 0-11 scoreline.

Brady later represented Cavan at under-20 level, but did not have success at this grade.

==== Senior ====
Brady joined the senior panel ahead of the 2018 season.

On 27 January 2018, Brady made his National League debut as a late substitute against Clare. Brady was named on the bench for the Division 2 final against Roscommon, and didn't feature in the 4-16 to 4-12 loss.

On 18 May 2019, Brady scored a point on his championship debut in an Ulser quarter-final win over Monaghan. Brady was at midfield for the Ulster final against Donegal on 23 June. Brady scored a point as Donegal ran out five-point winners.

Brady did not feature in Cavan's 2020 Ulster final success through injury. On 5 December, Brady came on as a substitute in the All-Ireland semi-final as Cavan exited the championship to eventual champions Dublin.

Cavan faced Tipperary in the National League Division 4 final at Croke Park on 2 April 2022. Brady came on as a substitute in the 2–10 to 0-15 victory.

On 9 July 2022, Brady was at wing back as Cavan took on Westmeath in the inaugural Tailteann Cup decider at Croke Park. Westmeath went home with the cup after a four-point win.

== Honours ==
Cavan

- Ulster Senior Football Championship (1): 2020
- National Football League Division 4 (1): 2022

Gowna

- Cavan Senior Football Championship (1): 2022
