= Lavey, County Cavan =

Civil parish in County Cavan, Ireland

Coordinates: 53.97°N 7.23°W

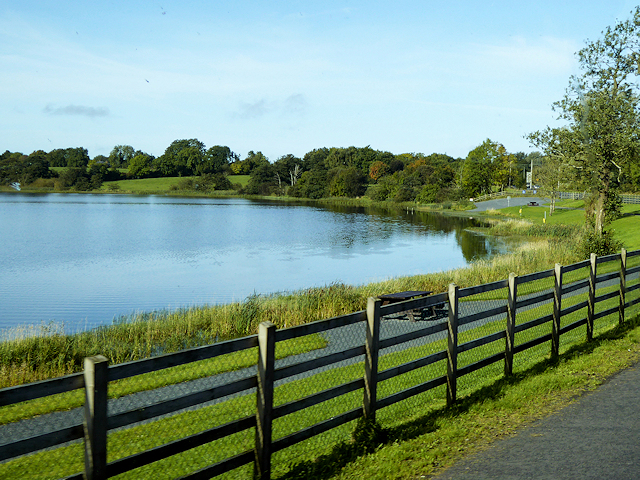
Lavey Lough beside the central village

Lavey, Gaelic Leamhach or Leamhaí, is a civil parish in County Cavan in the historic province of Leinster in the Republic of Ireland. It has an area of 43.9 km² and comprises 35 townlands, among them also a townland of Lavey.

== Geography ==
The parish sits on the main watershed of the island of Ireland. The homonymous central village at Lavey Lough and the northern part of the communal territory are part of the basin of River Stradone, a tributary of River Larah, and therefore in the basin of River Erne. The southern part of the parish is drained by a watercourse named Nadreegeel (or Nadrageel), a tributary of Kells Blackwater, and therefore in the basin of River Boyne.

The village lies between 80 and 90 metres above sea level.

== History ==
Traditionally, Lavey lay in the barony of Upper Loughtee. Before the Great Famine, in 1837, it had a population of 6,305 inhabitants.

== Life ==
Lavey is home of the Gaelic football club Lavey GFC.

== Weblinks ==
- Townlands portal → Cavan → Lavey
