= Crosserlough GFC =

Cavan-based Gaelic games club

- CLG Cros ar Loch
- Founded: 1903
- County: Cavan
- Colours: Black and Amber
- Grounds: Dr Plunket Memorial Park
- Coordinates: 53°51′42″N 7°18′56″W

Playing kits
Standard colours

Senior Club Championships
	All Ireland	Ulster champions	Cavan champions
Football:	0	0	11
Ladies' football:	0	0	2

Crosserlough is a Gaelic Athletic Association club from Kilnaleck, County Cavan in Ireland.

== Honours ==
Men's football

- Cavan Senior Football Championship (11)
  - 1958, 1961, 1966, 1967, 1968, 1969, 1970, 1971, 1972, 2020, 2024
- Cavan Intermediate Football Championship (0)
  - Runners-up 2011
- Cavan Junior Football Championship (1)
  - 1967
- Cavan Under-21 Football Championship (5)
  - 1983, 1984, 1989, 1991, 2018
- Cavan Minor Football Championship (7)
  - 1954, 1955, 1963, 1964, 1986, 1989, 2016

Ladies' football

- Cavan Senior Ladies' Football Championship (2)
  - 2019, 2021
- Cavan Intermediate Ladies' Football Championship (1)
  - 2017
- Cavan Junior Ladies' Football Championship (1)
  - 2020

== Notable players ==
- Andy McCabe

== See also ==
- Crosserlough
