= Gowna GFC =

Cavan-based Gaelic games club

Gowna
- Loch Gamhna
- Founded: 1889
- County: Cavan
- Colours: Green and Red
- Grounds: ClubSpot Park
- Coordinates: 53°52′00″N 7°33′04″W

Playing kits
Standard colours

Senior Club Championships
| | All Ireland | Ulster champions | Cavan champions |
|---|---|---|---|
| Football: | 0 | 0 | 10 |

Gowna are a Gaelic football club based in the village of Loch Gowna, County Cavan, Ireland.

== History ==
The GAA has been present in the local Gowna area since as early as 1889 and the club went under the name of Scrabby West Breffnians or 'Breffnies' as they were otherwise known, from the ancient Kingdom of Bréifne. Gowna's first major football success came in 1916 in the form of a junior championship. Gowna GFC, as we know it today, was officially reformed in 1976 and has gone through some major developmental change. The 'post reform' park was officially opened in 1982 and was revamped in 2011 to stand as it is today.

After reforming in 1976, Gowna claimed the Junior title in 1982 and won the Intermediate in 1985. Gowna reached the final of the Senior Championship in 1988, where they defeated Laragh United to claim the club's first senior title. They went on to win six more championships in 1994, 1996, 1997, 1999, 2000 and 2002. After a 20-year wait, in which they lost finals in 2007 and 2021, Gowna claimed their eighth senior crown in 2022. Gowna successfully defended their title in 2023, and added their tenth in 2026.

After winning the Ulster Senior Football Championship in 1997, Gowna's Dermot McCabe became the second Cavan player to win an All Star.

In 2021, the club became the first GAA club to sell the naming rights of their club grounds, with the grounds being rebranded as 'ClubSpot Park'.

Eamonn Murray is originally from Gowna.

== Honours ==
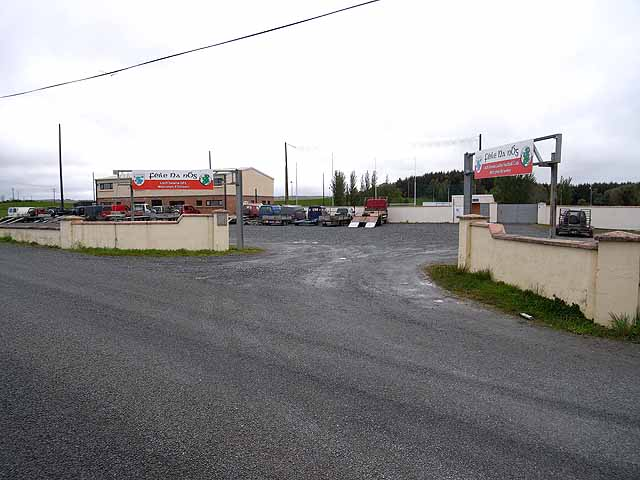
The entrance to Gowna's grounds, pictured in 2009

- Cavan Senior Football Championship: 10
  - 1988, 1994, 1996, 1997, 1999, 2000, 2002, 2022, 2023, 2026
- Cavan Intermediate Football Championship: 2
  - 1925, 1985
- Cavan Junior Football Championship: 3
  - 1916, 1934, 1982
- Cavan Under-21 Football Championship: 6 (+3)
  - 1981, 1985, 1986, 1987, 2017, (Note: Won as part of Southern Gaels (Gowna/Lacken)) 2021, 2022, 2023, 2024
- Cavan Minor Football Championship: 4 (+3)
  - 1958, 1983, 1984, 1985, 2014, 2020, 2025

== Notable players ==
- Dermot McCabe
- Mark McKeever
