= Sagrada Família =

Basilica under construction since 1882 in Barcelona, Spain

Basílica de la Sagrada Família (Basilica of the Holy Family)
- Basílica i Temple Expiatori de la Sagrada Família
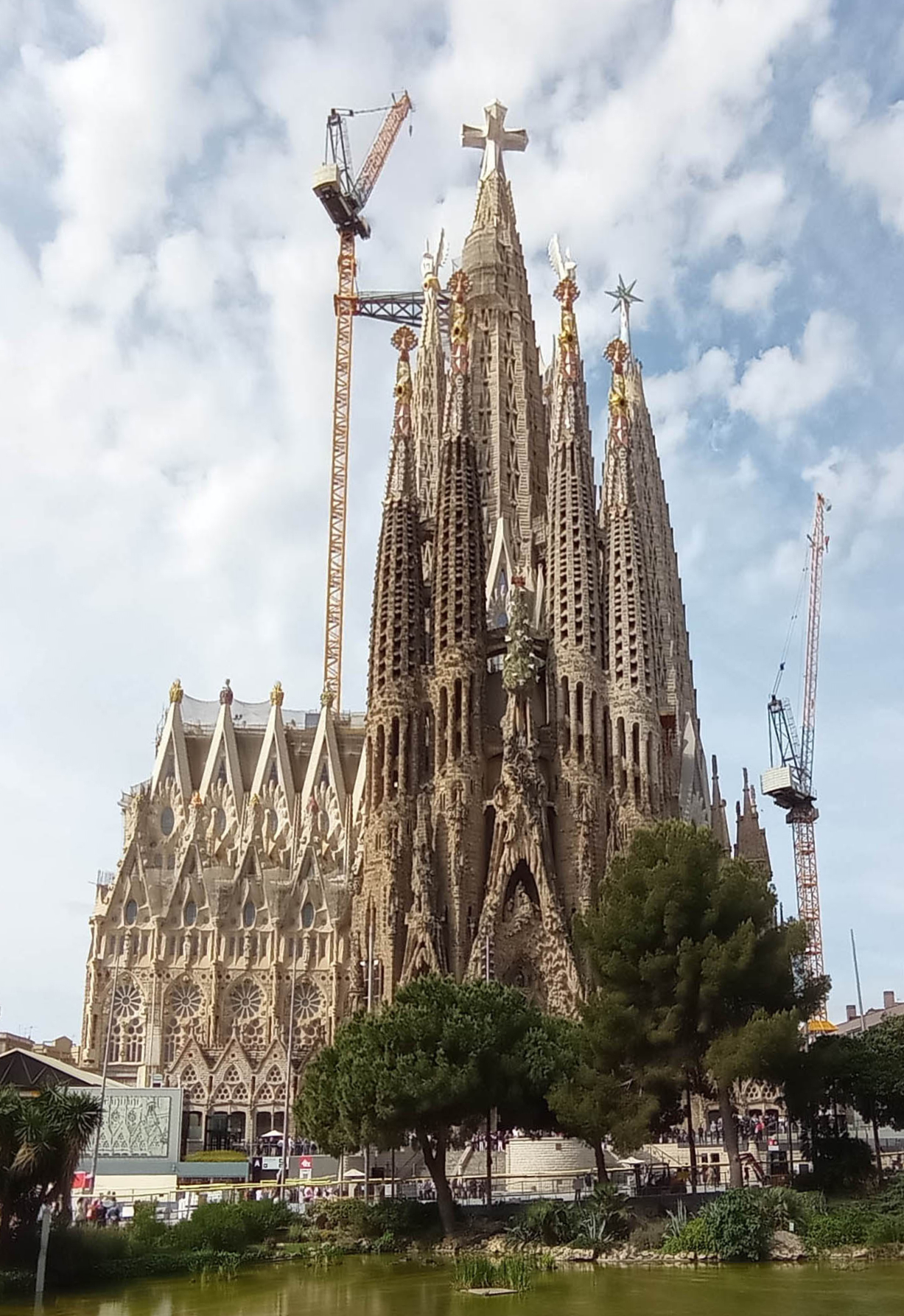
- General view in May 2026

Religion
- Affiliation: Catholic
- Diocese: Barcelona
- Ecclesiastical or organisational status: Minor basilica
- Leadership: Octavi Vilà Mayo, Archbishop of Barcelona
- Year consecrated: 7 November 2010; 16 years ago by Pope Benedict XVI
- Status: Under construction

Location
- Location: Barcelona, Spain
- Interactive map of Basílica de la Sagrada Família (Basilica of the Holy Family)
- Coordinates: 41°24′13″N 2°10′28″E

Architecture
- Architects: Antoni Gaudí and Francisco de Paula del Villar y Lozano
- Style: Gothic Revival, Art Nouveau, and Modernista
- General contractor: Construction Board of La Sagrada Família Foundation
- Groundbreaking: 19 March 1882; 144 years ago

Specifications
- Direction of façade: Southeast
- Capacity: 9,000
- Length: 90 m (300 ft)
- Width: 60 m (200 ft)
- Width (nave): 45 m (150 ft)
- Spire: 18 (13 already built)
- Spire height: 172.5 m (566 feet)
- Materials: Stone, reinforced concrete

Website
- Official website
- Sagrada Família

UNESCO World Heritage Site
- Official name: Nativity Façade and Crypt of the Basílica de la Sagrada Família
- Part of: Works of Antoni Gaudí
- Criteria: Cultural: (i), (ii), (iv)
- Reference: 320
- Inscription: 1984 (8th Session)
- Extensions: 2005 (29th session: addition of items 320-004 to 320-007)

Spanish Cultural Heritage
- Type: Non-movable
- Criteria: Monument
- Designated: 1969-07-24
- Reference no.: RI-51-0003813

Basílica i Temple Expiatori de la Sagrada Família, (Note: Catalan pronunciation: [bəˈzilikə i ˈtemplə əkspiəˈtɔɾi ðə lə səˈɣɾaðə fəˈmiliə]; Translation: Basilica and Expiatory Temple of the Holy Family; Spanish: Basílica y Templo Expiatorio de la Sagrada Familia) or simply Sagrada Família, is a Catholic Basilica under construction in the Eixample district of Barcelona, Catalonia, Spain. Designed by the Spanish architect Antoni Gaudí, it is the tallest church in the world. On 7 November 2010, Pope Benedict XVI consecrated the church and proclaimed it a basilica. In 2005, parts of the Sagrada Família (Nativity façade and Crypt) were declared a UNESCO World Heritage Site, under "Works of Antoni Gaudí".

On 19 March 1882, construction of Sagrada Família began under the architect Francisco de Paula del Villar. In 1883, when Villar resigned, Gaudí took over as chief architect, transforming the project with his architectural and engineering style, combining Gothic and curvilinear Art Nouveau forms. Gaudí devoted the remainder of his life to the project, and he is buried in the church's crypt. At the time of his death in 1926, less than a quarter of the project was complete.

Relying solely on private donations, Sagrada Família's construction progressed slowly and was interrupted by the Spanish Civil War. In July 1936, anarchists from the Iberian Anarchist Federation (Federación Anarquista Ibérica, or FAI) set fire to the crypt and broke their way into the workshop, partially destroying Gaudí's original plans. In 1939, Francesc de Paula Quintana took over site management, which was able to go on with the material that was saved from Gaudí's workshop and that was reconstructed from published plans and photographs. Construction resumed with intermittent progress in the 1950s. Advancements in technologies such as computer-aided design and computer numerical control (CNC) have since enabled faster progress, and construction passed the midpoint in 2010. In 2014, it was anticipated that the building would be completed by 2026, the centenary of Gaudí's death, but this schedule was threatened by work slowdowns caused by the COVID-19 pandemic.

The central Tower of Jesus Christ reached structural completion on 20 February 2026, when the final piece was installed, and it was inaugurated and blessed by Pope Leo XIV on 10 June 2026 during his visit to Spain, coinciding with the centenary of Gaudí's death. The tower, with a height of 172.5 m (566 ft), makes the Sagrada Família the world's tallest church.

Describing Sagrada Família, the art critic Rainer Zerbst said "it is probably impossible to find a church building anything like it in the entire history of art", and Paul Goldberger describes it as "the most extraordinary personal interpretation of Gothic architecture since the Middle Ages".

Though sometimes described as a cathedral, the basilica is not the cathedral church of the Archdiocese of Barcelona; that title belongs to the Cathedral of the Holy Cross and Saint Eulalia.

== History ==
=== 19th century ===
Sagrada Família was inspired by a bookseller, José María Bocabella, founder of Asociación Espiritual de Devotos de San José (Spiritual Association of Devotees of St. Joseph). After a visit to the Vatican in 1872, Bocabella returned from Italy with the intention of building a church inspired by the basilica at Loreto. It was to be an "expiatory temple", funded entirely by donations from persons seeking to counter a growing rejection of the Catholic Church and its values. The apse crypt of the church was begun on 19 March 1882, on the festival of St. Joseph, to the design of the architect Francisco de Paula del Villar, whose plan was for a Gothic revival church of a standard form. The apse crypt was completed before Villar's resignation on 18 March 1883, when Antoni Gaudí assumed responsibility for its design, which he changed radically. Gaudí began work on the church in November of 1883 but was not appointed Architect Director until 28 March 1884.

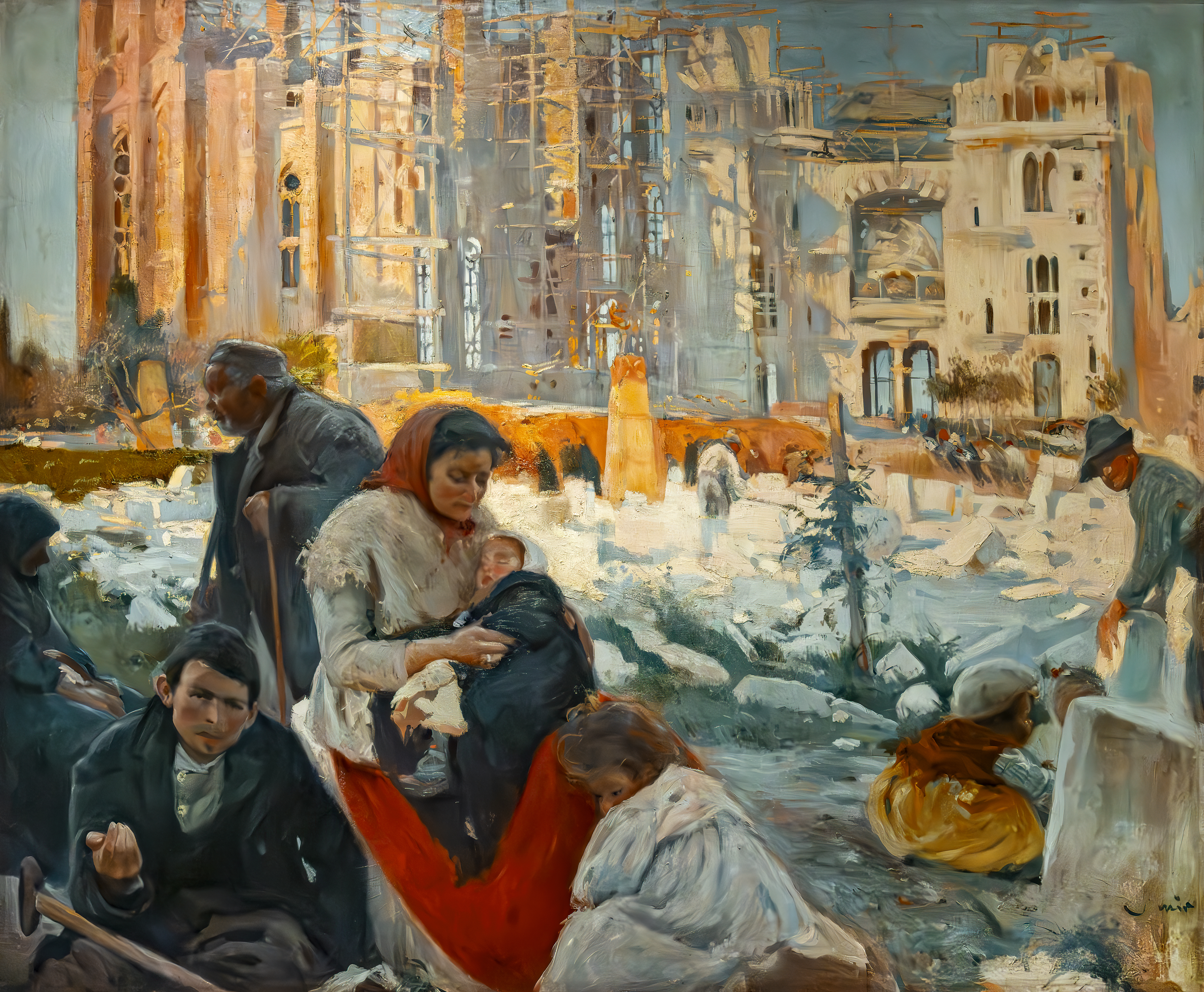
The Cathedral of the Paupers, by Joaquim Mir, 1898

=== 20th century ===
On the subject of the extremely long construction period, Gaudí is said to have remarked: "My client is not in a hurry." When Gaudí died in 1926, the basilica was between 15 and 25 percent complete. After Gaudí's death, work continued under the direction of his main disciple Domènec Sugrañes i Gras until interrupted by the Spanish Civil War in 1936. Parts of the unfinished basilica and Gaudí's models and workshop were destroyed during the war. The present design is based on reconstructed versions of the plans that were burned in a fire as well as on modern adaptations. Since 1940, the architects Francesc Quintana, Isidre Puig Boada, Lluís Bonet i Garí and Francesc Cardoner have carried on the work. The illumination was designed by Carles Buïgas. The director until 2012 was the son of Lluís Bonet, Jordi Bonet i Armengol. Armengol began introducing computers into the design and construction process in the 1980s.

=== 21st century ===
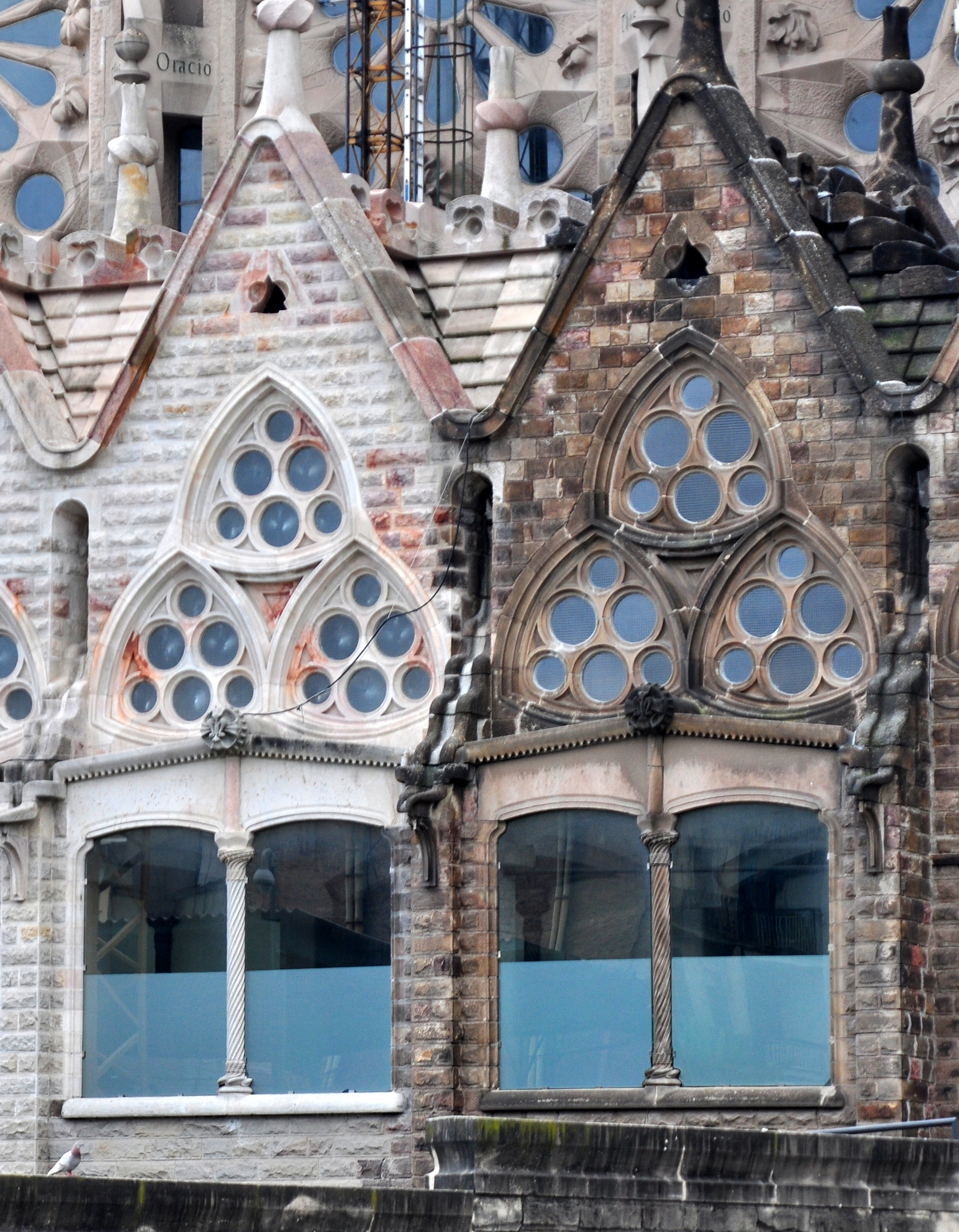
New stonework at Sagrada Família (left) is visible against the stained and weathered older sections (right).

The central nave vaulting was completed in 2000 and the main tasks since then have been the construction of the transept vaults and apse. In 2002, the Sagrada Família Schools building was relocated from the eastern corner of the site to the southern corner, and began housing an exhibition. The school was originally designed by Gaudí in 1909 for the children of the construction workers.

As of 2006, work concentrated on the crossing and supporting structure for the main steeple of Jesus Christ as well as the southern enclosure of the central nave, which will become the Glory façade. Computer-aided design technology has allowed stone to be shaped off-site by a computer numerical control milling machine, whereas in the 20th century the stone was carved by hand. In 2008, some renowned Catalan architects advocated halting construction to respect Gaudí's original designs, which, although they were not exhaustive and were partially destroyed, have been partially reconstructed in the early 21st century.

Since 2013, AVE high-speed trains have passed near Sagrada Família through a tunnel that runs beneath the centre of Barcelona. The tunnel's construction, which began on 26 March 2010, was controversial. The Ministry of Public Works of Spain (Ministerio de Fomento) said the project posed no risk to the church. Sagrada Família engineers and architects disagreed, saying there was no guarantee that the tunnel would not affect the stability of the building. The Board of the Sagrada Família (Patronat de la Sagrada Família) and the neighborhood association AVE pel Litoral (AVE by the Coast) led a campaign against this route for the AVE, without success. In October 2010, the tunnel boring machine reached the church underground under the location of the building's principal façade. Service through the tunnel was inaugurated on 8 January 2013. Track in the tunnel makes use of a system by Edilon Sedra in which the rails are embedded in an elastic material to damp vibrations.

The main nave was covered and an organ was installed in mid-2010, allowing the still-unfinished building to be used for liturgies. The church was consecrated by Pope Benedict XVI on 7 November 2010 in front of a congregation of 6,500 people. A further 50,000 people followed the consecration Mass from outside the basilica, where more than 100 bishops and 300 priests were on hand to distribute Holy Communion.

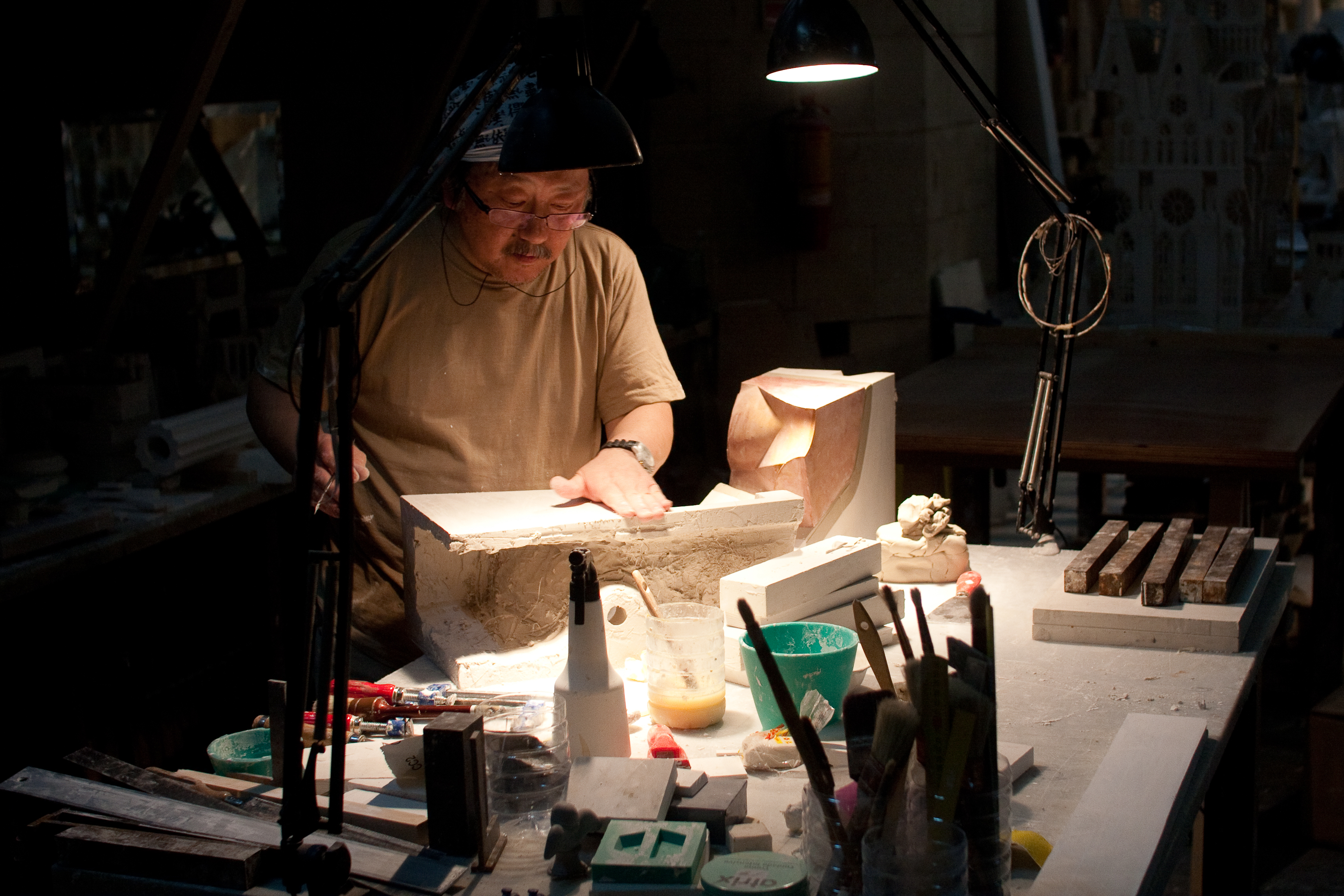
Japanese artist Etsuro Sotoo working in a gypsum workshop in 2010 for sculptures to this church

In 2012, Barcelona-born Jordi Faulí i Oller took over as architect of the project. Mark Burry of New Zealand serves as Executive Architect and Researcher. Sculptures by J. Busquets, Etsuro Sotoo and Josep Maria Subirachs decorate the fantastical façades.

Chief architect Jordi Faulí announced in October 2015 that construction was 70 percent complete and had entered its final phase of raising six immense steeples. Those steeples and most of the church's structure were planned to be completed by 2026, the centennial of Gaudí's death; as of a 2017 estimate, decorative elements should be complete by 2030 or 2032. Visitor entrance fees of €15 to €20 finance the annual construction budget of €25 million. Completion of the structure will use post-tensioned stone.

Starting on 9 July 2017, an international mass is celebrated at the basilica every Sunday and holy day of obligation, at 9 a.m., and is open to the public (until the church is full). Occasionally, Mass is celebrated at other times, where attendance requires an invitation. When masses are scheduled, instructions to obtain an invitation are posted on the basilica's website. In addition, visitors may pray in the chapel of the Blessed Sacrament and Penitence.

The stone that was originally used in the construction came from Montjuïc, but as quarrying progressed to deeper levels, the stone became increasingly fragile and an alternative source had to be found. Since 2018, stone of the type needed to complete the construction has been sourced from the Withnell Quarry in Brinscall, near Chorley, England.

On 30 October 2025, Sagrada Família became the world's tallest church after a part of its central tower was lifted into place and reached 162.91 m, surpassing Ulm Minster (161.53 m). The tower reached its full height of 172.5 m on 20 February 2026. The tallest central spire (reaching 172.5 meters) represents Jesus Christ. Gaudí specifically designed this tower to be one metre shorter than Barcelona’s Montjuïc hill, believing that his man-made creation should not surpass God's natural work. On 10 June 2026, Pope Leo XIV blessed and inaugurated the completed Tower of Jesus Christ at the basilica during his visit to Spain, coinciding with the centenary of Antoni Gaudí's death.

=== Historical photographs of Sagrada Família ===
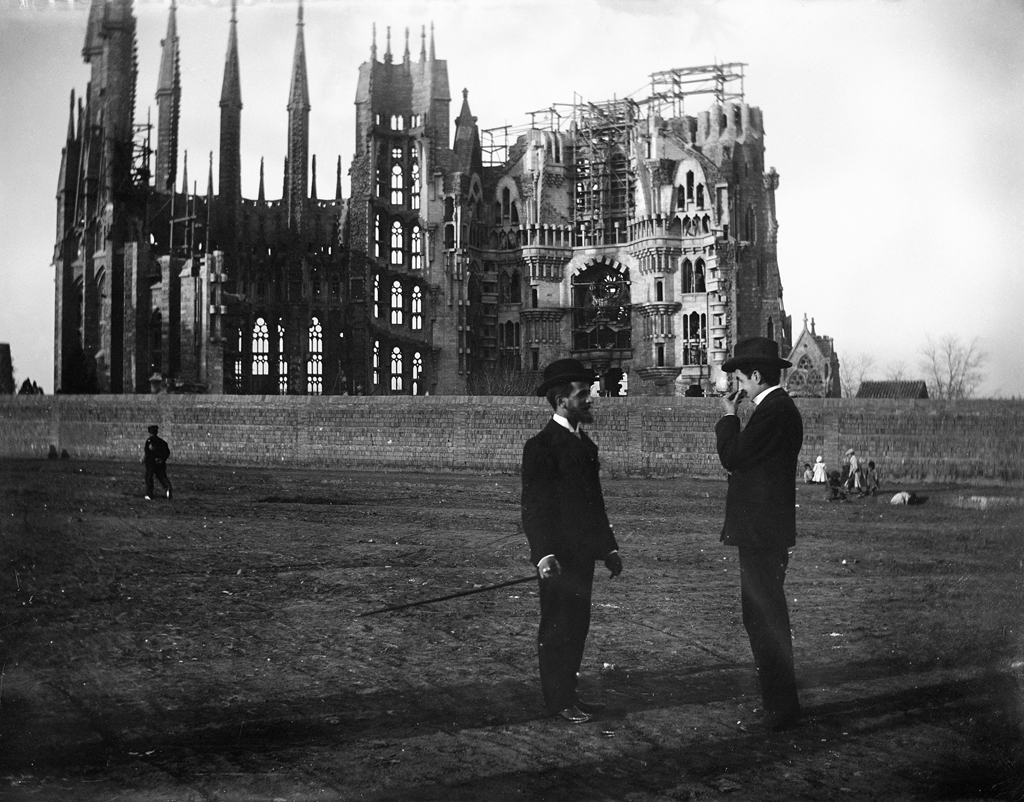
1905

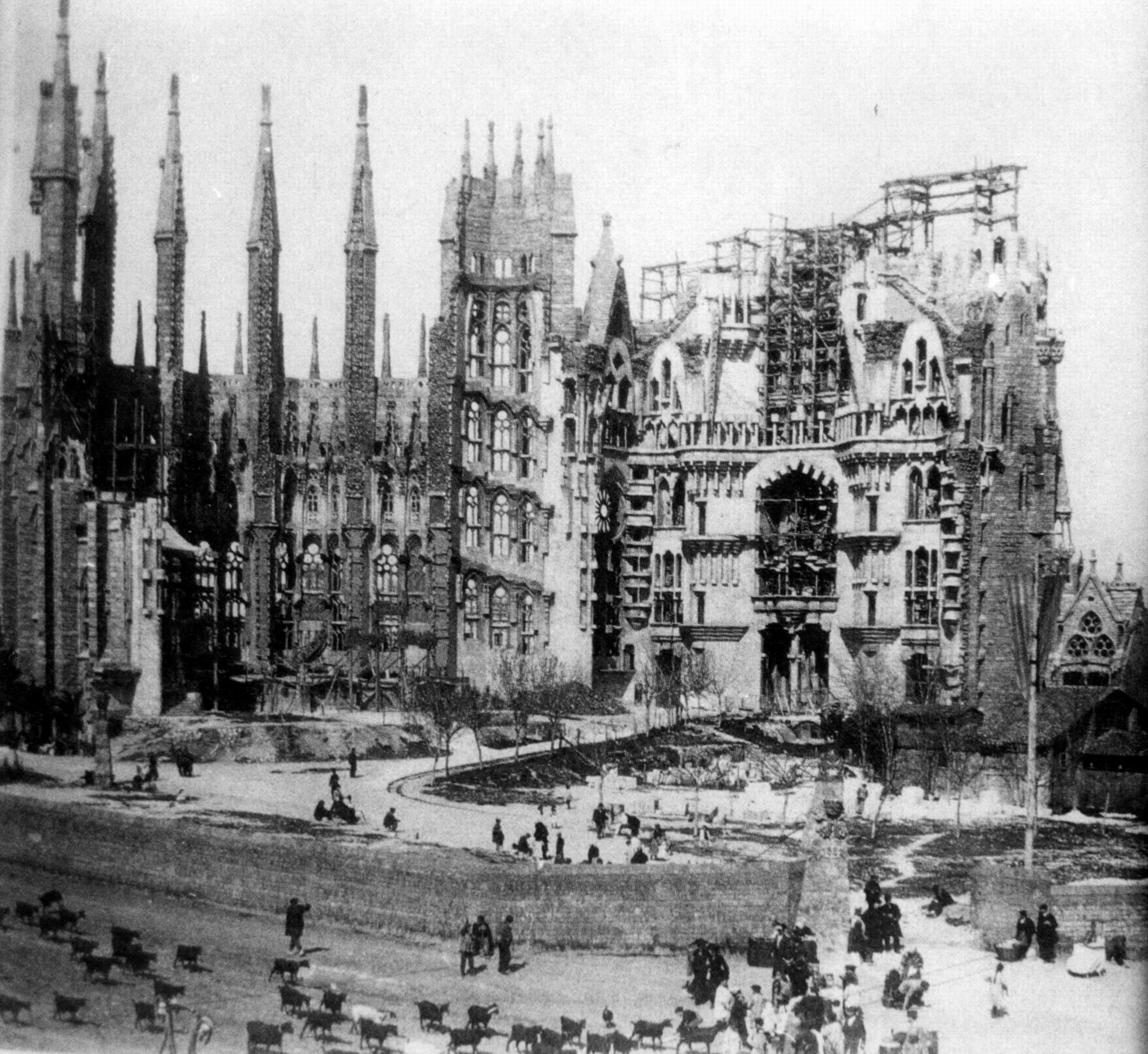
1915

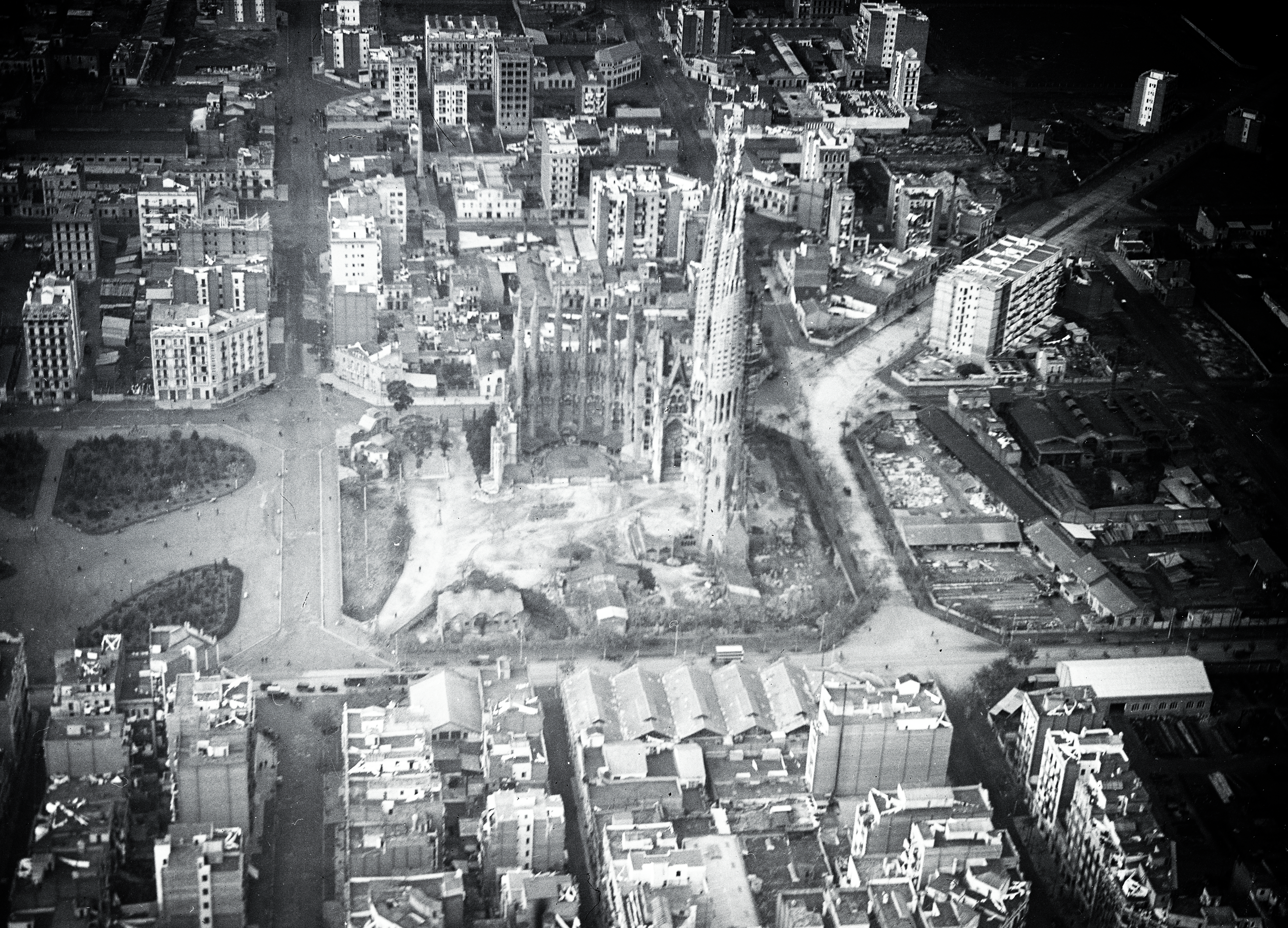
1930. Aerial photograph by Walter Mittelholzer, ETH-Bibliothek.

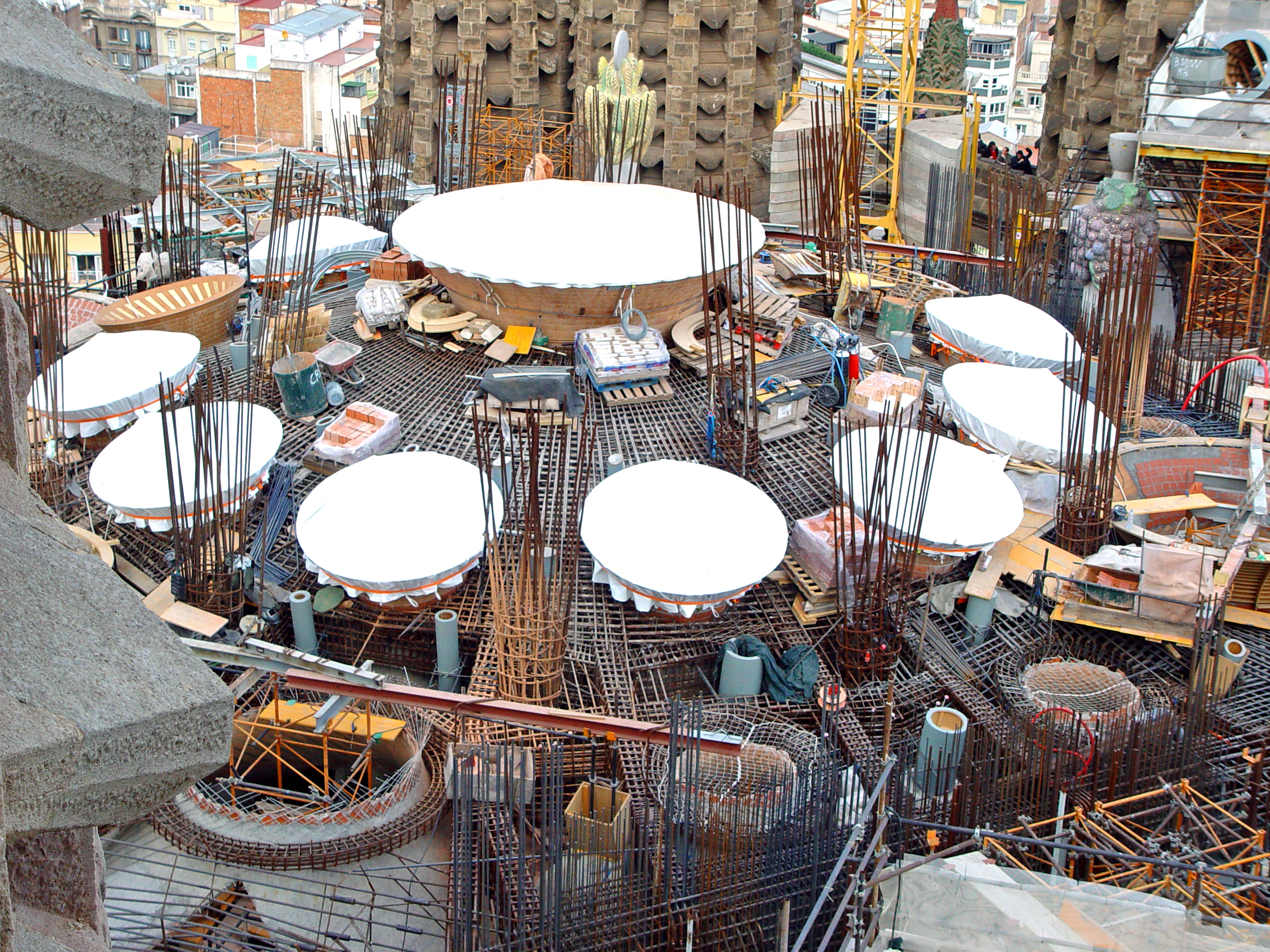
Base of the Christ steeple under construction (2009)

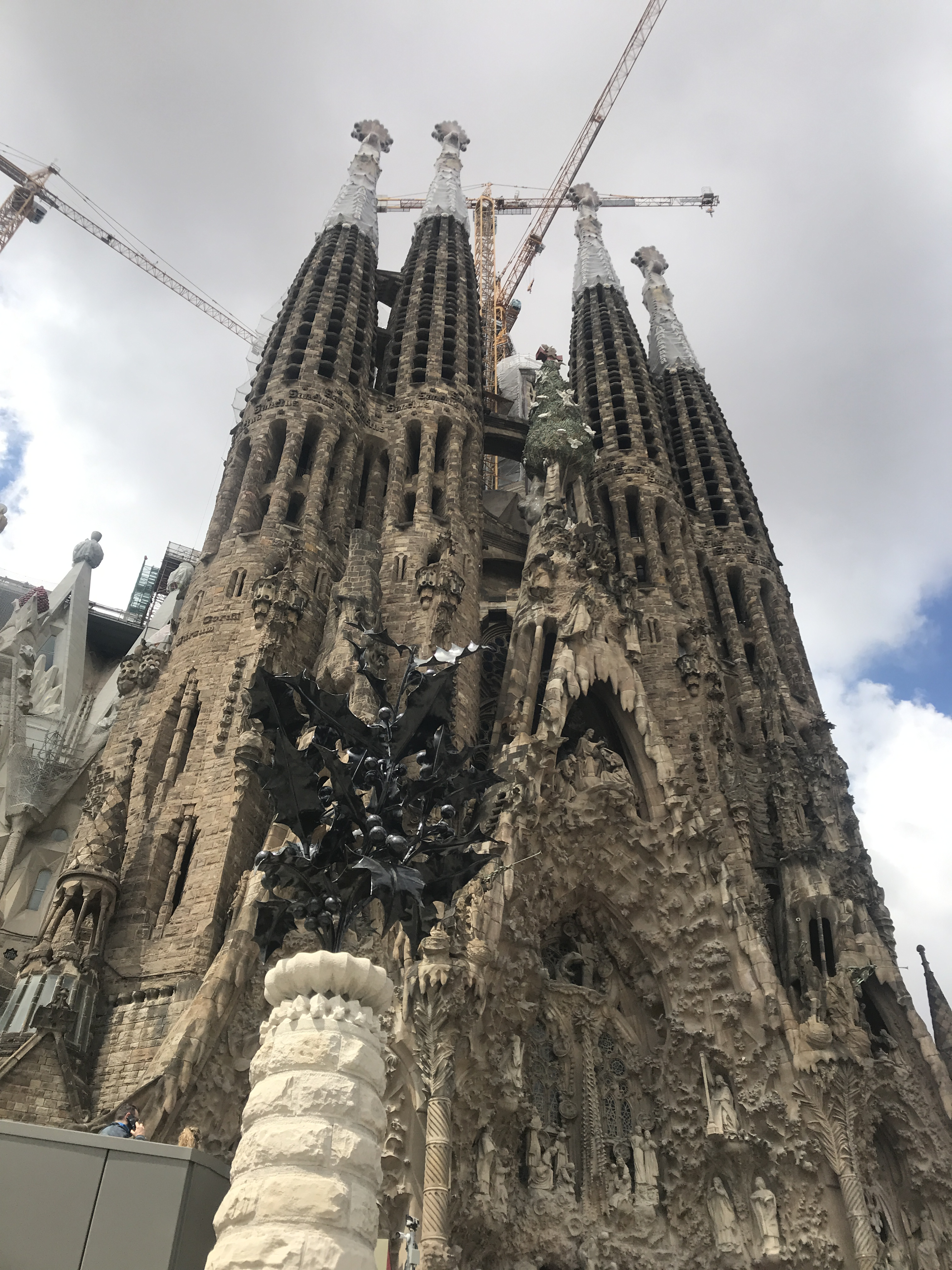
2019

== Design ==
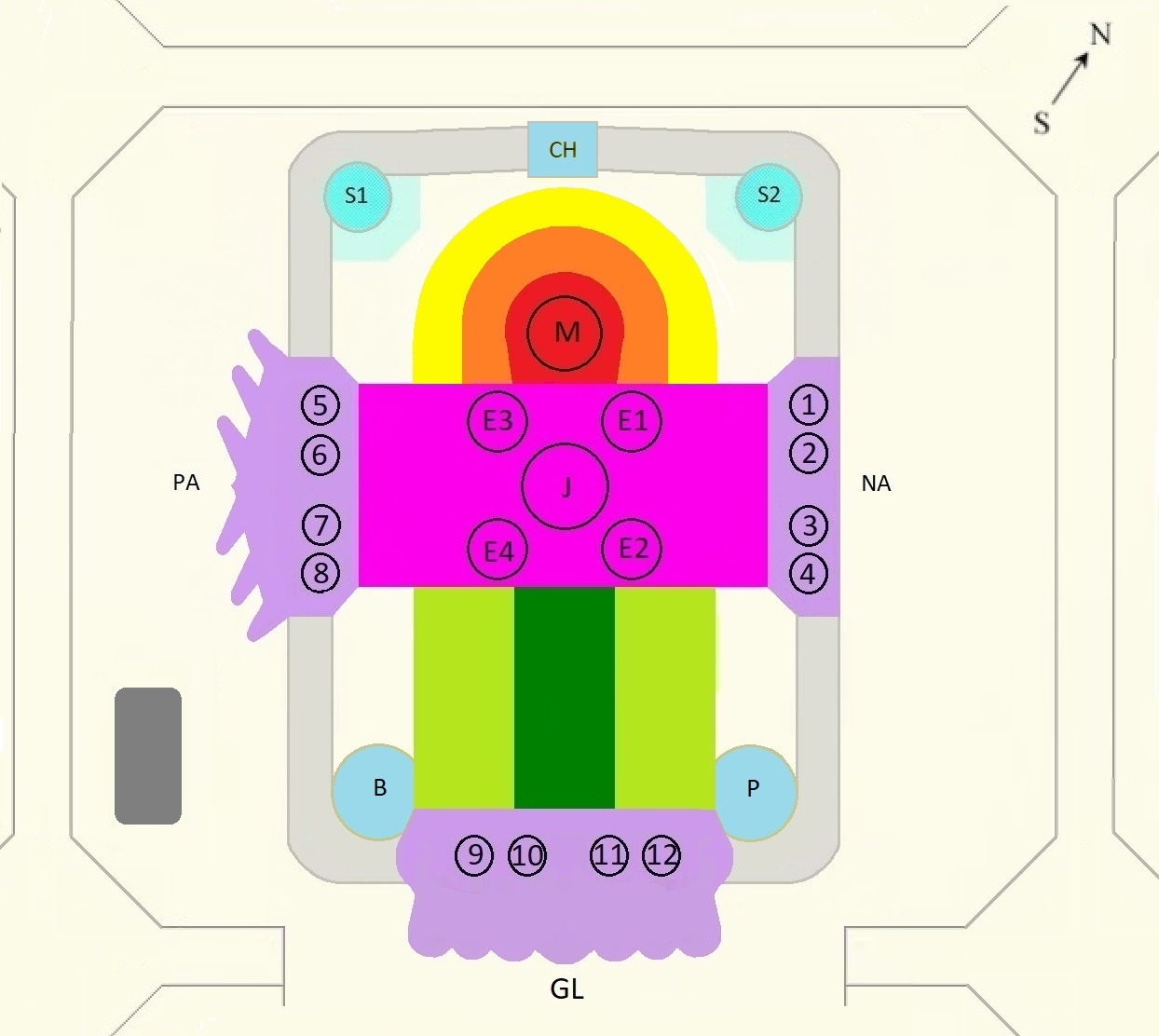
Plan view of Sagrada Família Apse Ambulatory Choir Transept Façades Main nave Aisles Cloister Reconstruction of the schools See the image page for the map's full legend.

The style of Sagrada Família is variously likened to Spanish Late Gothic, Catalan Modernism or Art Nouveau. While the style falls within the Art Nouveau period, Nikolaus Pevsner points out that, along with Charles Rennie Mackintosh in Glasgow, Scotland, Gaudí carried the Art Nouveau style far beyond its usual application as a surface decoration.

=== Plan ===
While never a cathedral, Sagrada Família was planned from the outset to be a large building, comparable in size to a cathedral. Its ground-plan has obvious links to earlier Spanish cathedrals such as Burgos Cathedral, León Cathedral and Seville Cathedral. In common with Catalan and many other European Gothic cathedrals, Sagrada Família is short in comparison to its width, and has a great complexity of parts, which include double aisles, an ambulatory with a chevet of seven apsidal chapels, a multitude of steeples and three portals, each widely different in structure as well as ornament. Where it is common for cathedrals in Spain to be surrounded by numerous chapels and ecclesiastical buildings, the layout of Sagrada Família has an unusual covered passage or cloister which forms a rectangle enclosing the church and passing through the narthex of each of its three portals. With this peculiarity aside, the plan, influenced by Villar's crypt, barely hints at the complexity of Gaudí's design or its deviations from traditional church architecture. There are no exact right angles to be seen inside or outside the church, and few straight lines in the design.

=== Spires ===
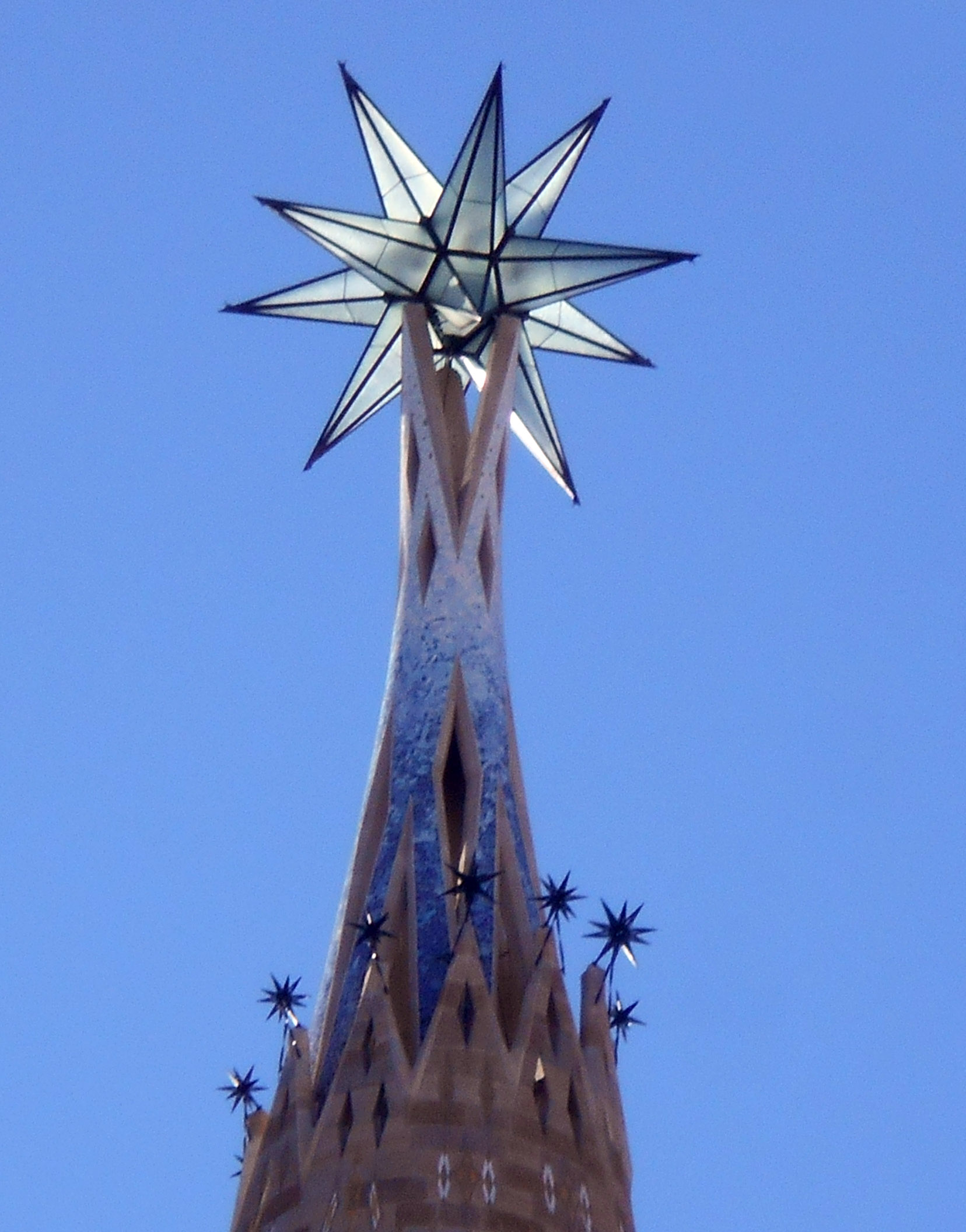
Top of the Virgin Mary's Spire (completed in December 2021)

Gaudí's original design calls for a total of eighteen spires, representing in ascending order of height the Twelve Apostles, (Note: Note: the two Apostles who are also Evangelists are left out and replaced by St. Paul and also St. Barnabas.) the four Evangelists, the Virgin Mary, and, tallest of all, Jesus Christ. Fourteen spires have been completed as of 2026, corresponding to four apostles at the Nativity façade, four apostles at the Passion façade, the four Evangelists, the Virgin Mary, and Jesus Christ.

The Evangelists' spires are surmounted by sculptures of their traditional symbols: a winged bull (Saint Luke), a winged man (Saint Matthew), an eagle (Saint John), and a winged lion (Saint Mark). The central spire of Jesus Christ is surmounted by a giant cross; its total height (172.5 metres (566 ft)) is less than that of Montjuïc hill in Barcelona, as Gaudí believed that his creation should not surpass God's. The lower spires are surmounted by communion hosts with sheaves of wheat and chalices with bunches of grapes, representing the Eucharist. Plans call for tubular bells to be placed within the spires, driven by the force of the wind, and driving sound down into the interior of the church. Gaudí performed acoustic studies to achieve the appropriate acoustic results inside the temple. However, as of 2004, only one bell was in place.

On 29 November 2021, a 7 m (23 ft) twelve-pointed illuminated crystal star was installed on one of the main towers of the basilica dedicated to the Virgin Mary.

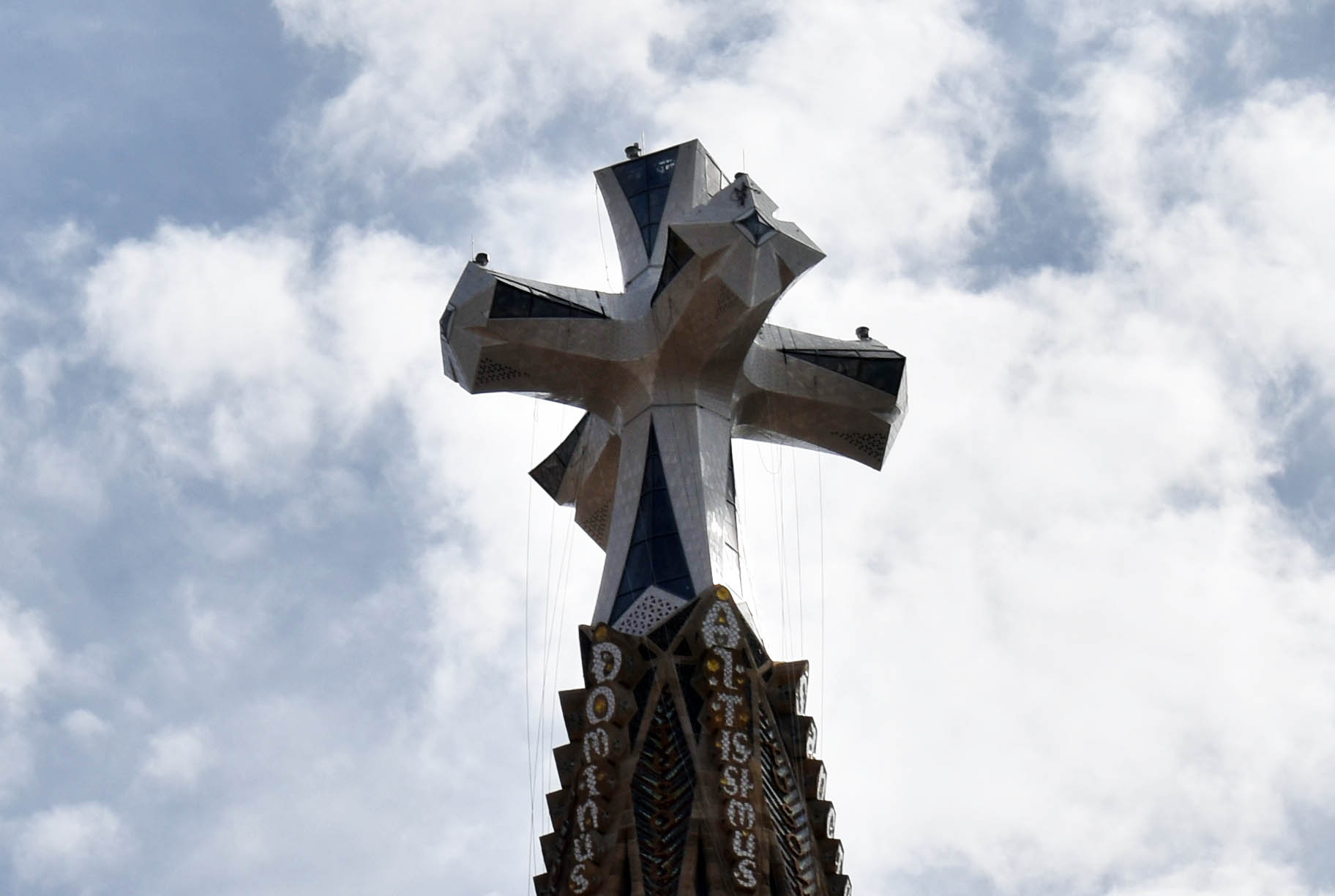
Top of the Tower of Jesus Christ (completed in February 2026)

With the completion of the exterior of the Jesus Christ spire on 20 February 2026, the Sagrada Família is the tallest church building in the world—11 metres (36.1 ft) taller than the former record-holder, Ulm Minster, which is 161.5 metres (529.9 ft). The completion of the interior of the spire is expected in 2028.

The construction makes use of post-tensioned stone panels, which are pre-assembled before incorporation into the main structure; using this method has significant structural and operational benefits.

=== Façades ===
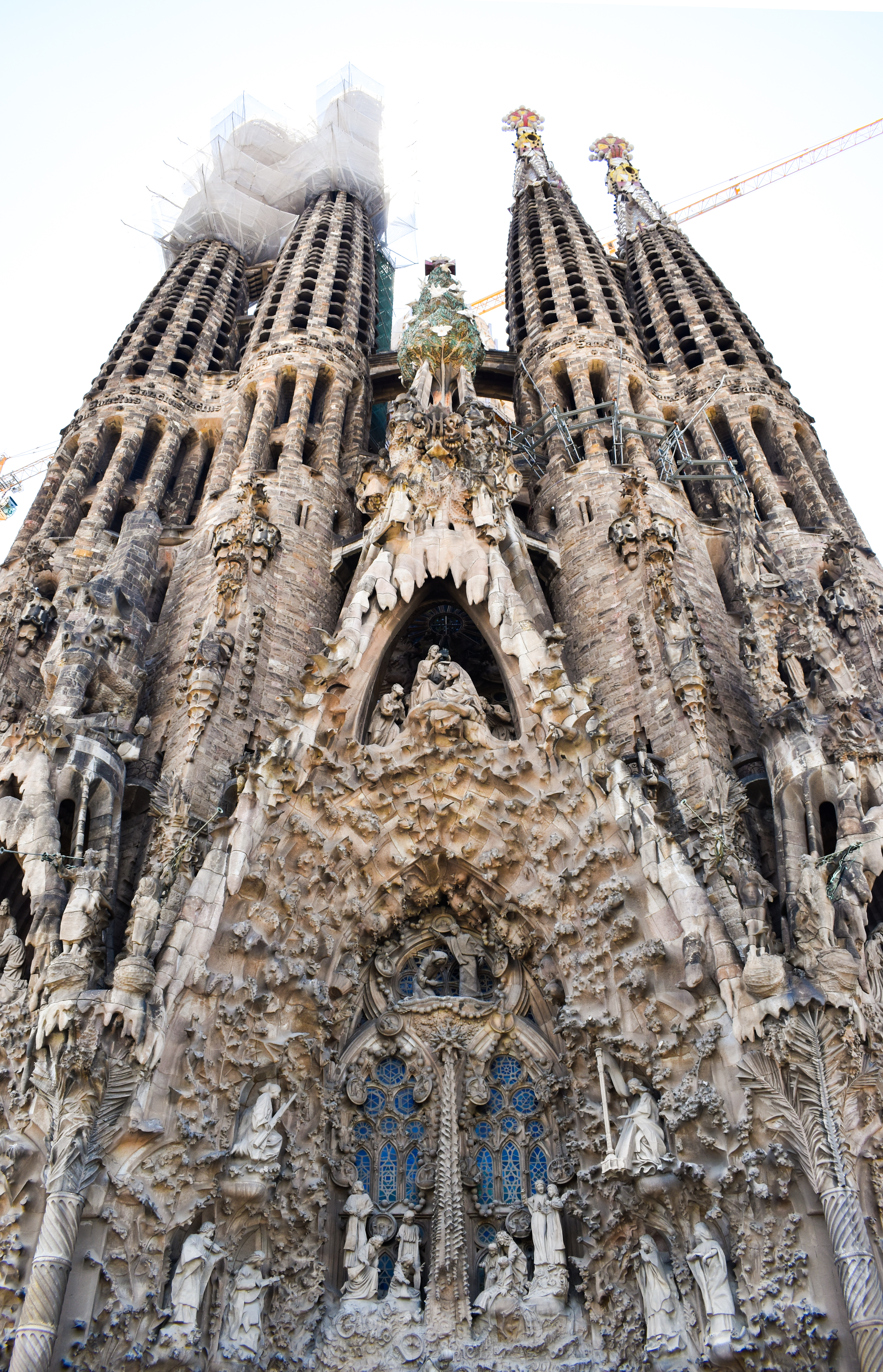
The Nativity façade

The church is designed to have three grand façades: the Nativity façade to the east, the Passion façade to the west, and the Glory façade to the south (incomplete).

The Nativity façade was built before work was interrupted in 1935 and bears the most direct Gaudí influence. Both it and the Passion façade have bell towers with biblical narratives in ornately carved stone topped with insignia-like pinnacles made from mosaics of Venetian glass.

The Passion façade was built according to the design that Gaudi created in 1917. The construction began in 1954, and the steeples, built over the elliptical plan, were finished in 1976. It is especially striking for its spare, gaunt, tormented characters, including emaciated figures of Christ being scourged at the pillar; and Christ on the Cross. These controversial designs are the work of Josep Maria Subirachs.

The Glory façade, the main entrance of the church, on which construction began in 2002, will be the largest and most monumental of the three and will represent one's ascension to God. It will also depict various scenes such as Hell, Purgatory, and will include elements such as the seven deadly sins and the seven heavenly virtues.

==== Nativity Façade ====
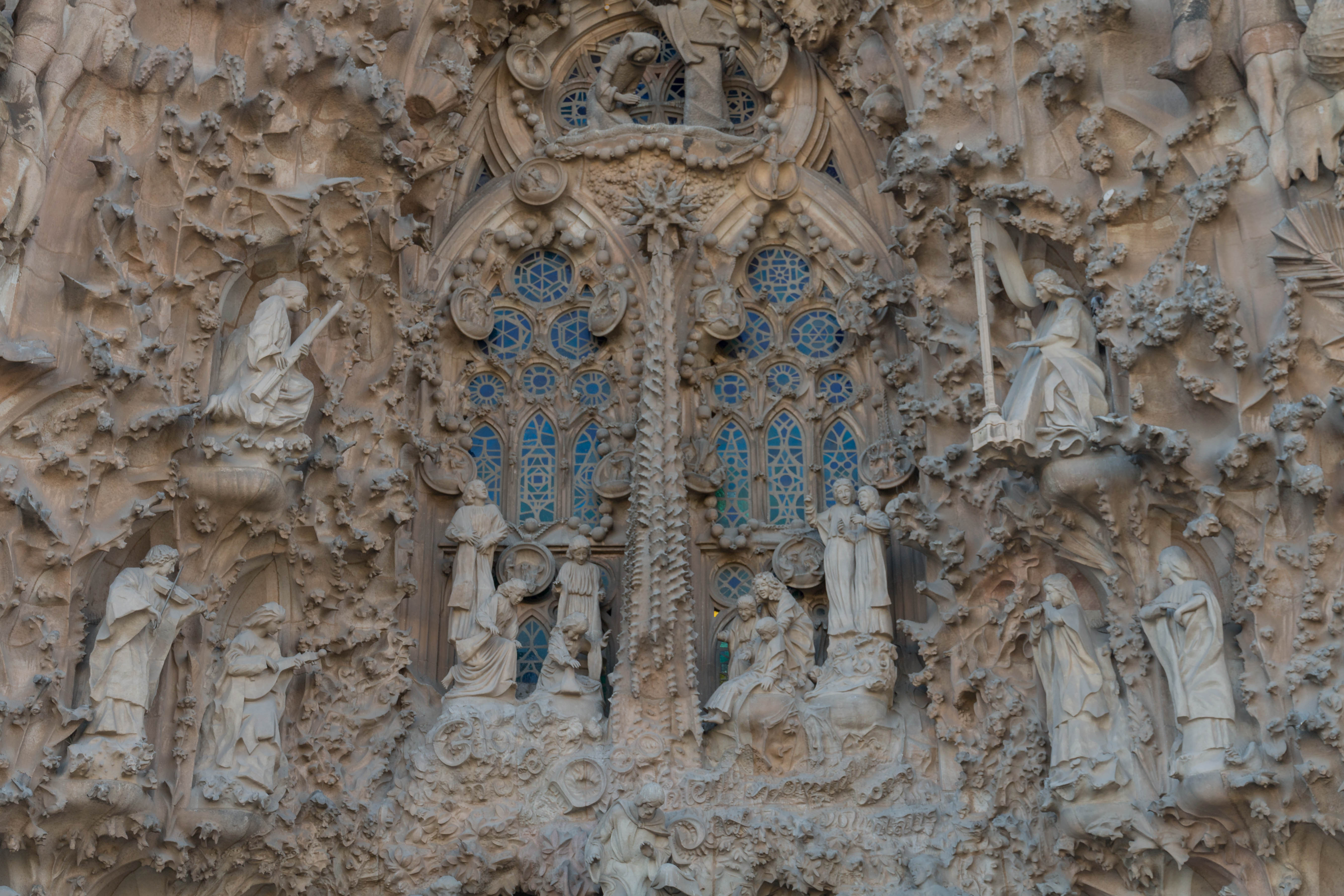
Sculpture of the choir of angel children

Constructed between 1893 and 1936, the Nativity façade was the first façade to be completed. Dedicated to the birth of Jesus, it is decorated with scenes reminiscent of elements of life. Characteristic of Gaudí's naturalistic style, the sculptures are ornately arranged and decorated with scenes and images from nature, each a symbol in its own manner. For instance, the three porticos are separated by two large columns, and at the base of each lies a turtle or a tortoise (one to represent the land and the other the sea; each are symbols of time as something set in stone and unchangeable). In contrast to the figures of turtles and their symbolism, two chameleons can be found at either side of the façade and are symbolic of change.

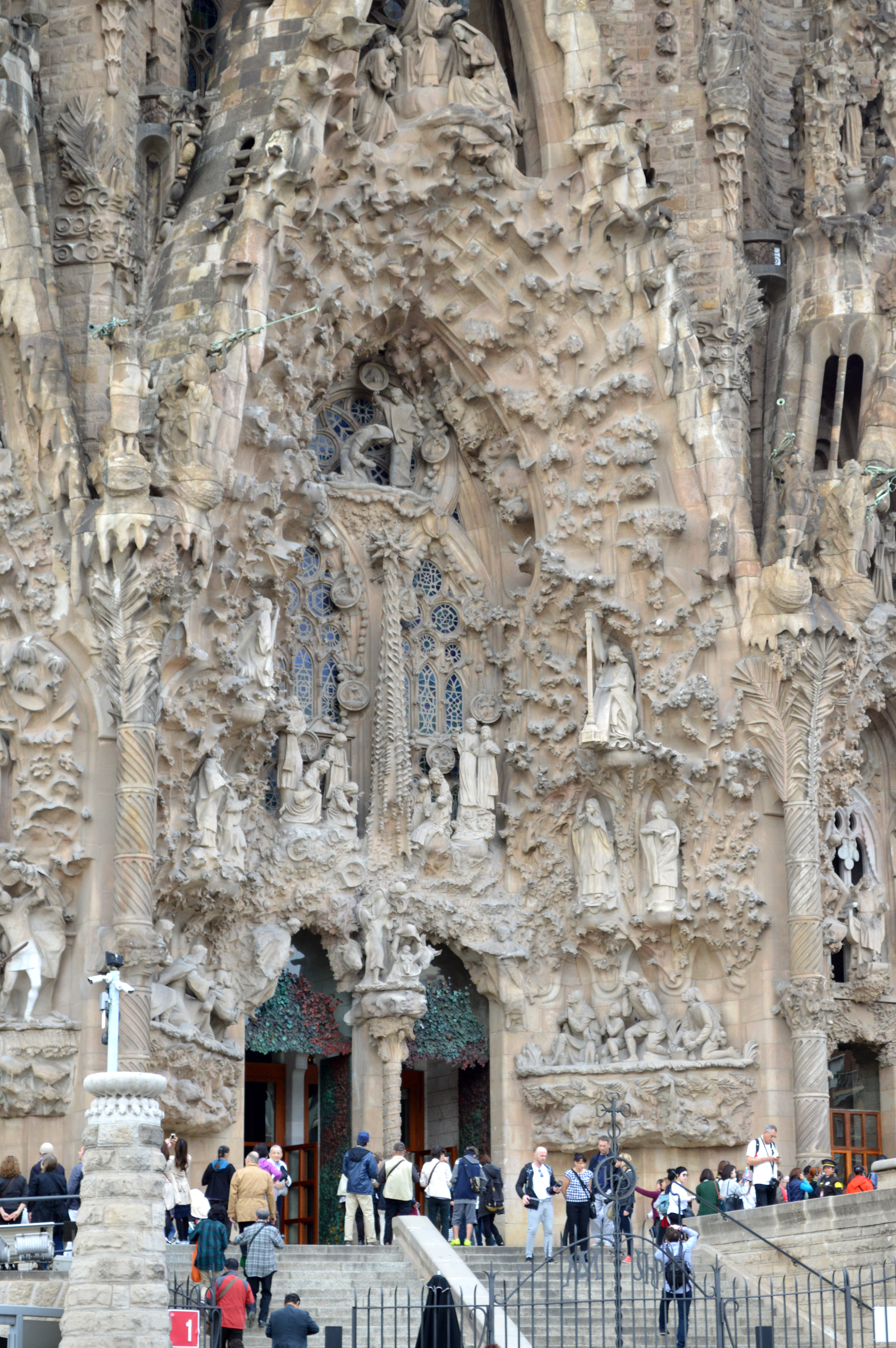
The Portal of Charity on the Nativity Façade, created by Etsuro Sotoo

The façade faces the rising sun to the northeast, a symbol for the birth of Christ. It is divided into three porticos, each of which represents a theological virtue (Hope, Faith and Charity). The Tree of Life rises above the door of Jesus in the portico of Charity. Four steeples complete the façade and are each dedicated to a Saint (Matthias, Barnabas, Jude the Apostle, and Simon the Zealot).

Originally, Gaudí intended for this façade to be polychromed, for each archivolt to be painted with a wide array of colours. He wanted every statue and figure to be painted. In this way the figures of humans would appear as much alive as the figures of plants and animals.

Gaudí chose this façade to embody the structure and decoration of the whole church. He was well aware that he would not finish the church and that he would need to set an artistic and architectural example for others to follow. He also chose for this façade to be the first on which to begin construction and for it to be, in his opinion, the most attractive and accessible to the public. He believed that if he had begun construction with the Passion Façade, one that would be hard and bare (as if made of bones), before the Nativity Façade, people would have withdrawn at the sight of it. Some of the statues were destroyed in 1936 during the Spanish Civil War, and subsequently were reconstructed by the Japanese artist Etsuro Sotoo.

==== Passion Façade ====
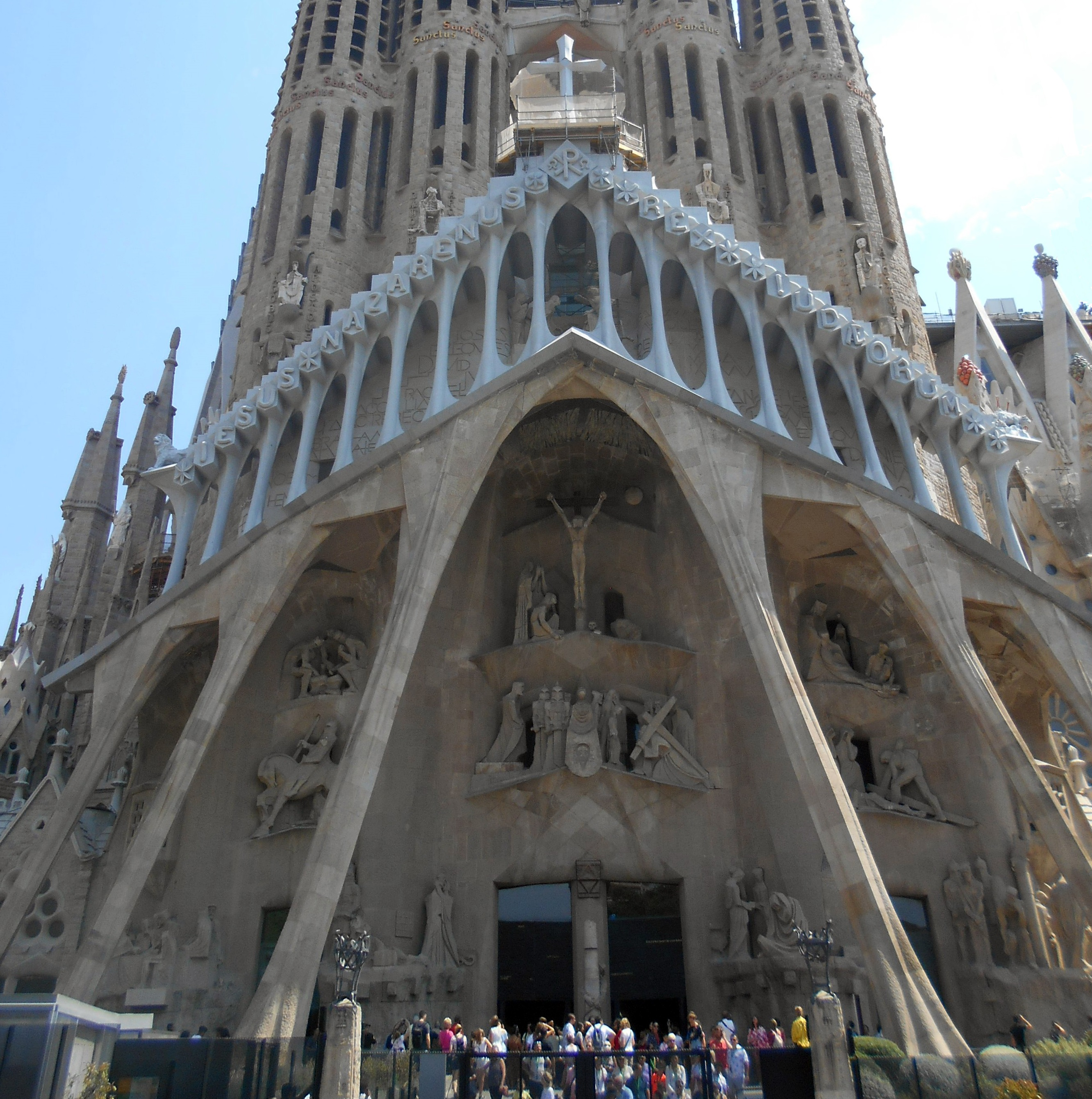
Passion Façade of Sagrada Família in 2018

In contrast to the highly decorated Nativity Façade, the Passion Façade is austere, plain and simple, with ample bare stone, and is carved with harsh straight lines to resemble the bones of a skeleton. Dedicated to the Passion of Christ, the suffering of Jesus during his crucifixion, the façade was intended to portray the sins of mankind. Construction began in 1954, following the drawings and instructions left by Gaudí for future architects and sculptors. The steeples were completed in 1976, and in 1987 a team of sculptors, headed by Josep Maria Subirachs, began work sculpting the scenes and details of the façade. They aimed to give a rigid, angular form to provoke a dramatic effect. Gaudí intended for this façade to strike fear into the onlooker. He wanted to "break" arcs and "cut" columns, and to use the effect of chiaroscuro (dark angular shadows contrasted by harsh rigid light) to further show the severity and brutality of Christ's sacrifice.

Facing the setting sun, indicative and symbolic of the death of Christ, the Passion Façade is supported by six large and inclined columns, designed to resemble strained muscles. Above, there is a pyramidal pediment, made up of eighteen bone-shaped columns, which culminate in a large cross with a crown of thorns. The columns also feature the Latin text which was displayed atop Jesus' cross. Each of the four steeples is dedicated to an apostle (James, Thomas, Philip, and Bartholomew) and, like the Nativity Façade, there are three porticos, each representing the theological virtues, though in a much different light.

The scenes sculpted into the façade may be divided into three levels, which ascend in an S form and reproduce the Stations of the Cross (Via Crucis of Christ). The lowest level depicts scenes from Jesus' last night before the crucifixion, including the Last Supper, Kiss of Judas, Ecce homo, and the Sanhedrin trial of Jesus. The middle level portrays the Calvary, or Golgotha, of Christ, and includes The Three Marys, Saint Longinus, Saint Veronica, and a hollow-face illusion of Christ on the Veil of Veronica. In the third and final level the Death, Burial and the Resurrection of Christ can be seen. A bronze figure situated on a bridge creating a link between the steeples of Saint Bartholomew and Saint Thomas represents the Ascension of Jesus.

The façade contains a magic square based on the magic square in the 1514 print Melencolia I. The square is rotated and one number in each row and column is reduced by one, so the rows and columns add up to 33 instead of the standard 34 for a 4x4 magic square.

==== Glory Façade ====
The largest and most striking of the façades will be the Glory Façade, on which construction began in 2002. The Façade faces south in order to capture the glory of the sun at its zenith, and additionally references Revelation 1:7. It will be the principal façade and will offer access to the central nave. Dedicated to the Celestial Glory of Jesus, it represents the road to God: Death, Final Judgment, and Glory, while Hell is left for those who deviate from God's will. Aware that he would not live long enough to see this façade completed, Gaudí made a model which was demolished in 1936, whose original fragments were used as the basis for the development of the design for the façade. The completion of this façade may require the partial demolition of the block of buildings across the Carrer de Mallorca. As of 2025, the architects say the plans will proceed despite protests.

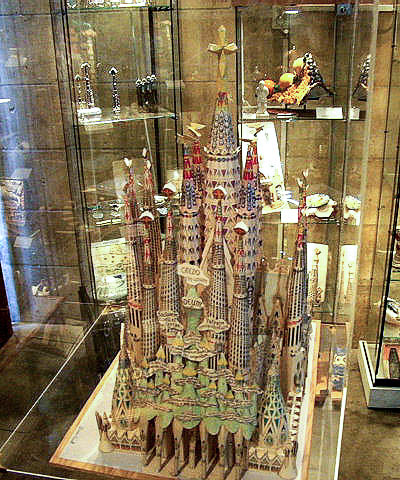
Model of the completed Temple. The Glory Façade is in the foreground.

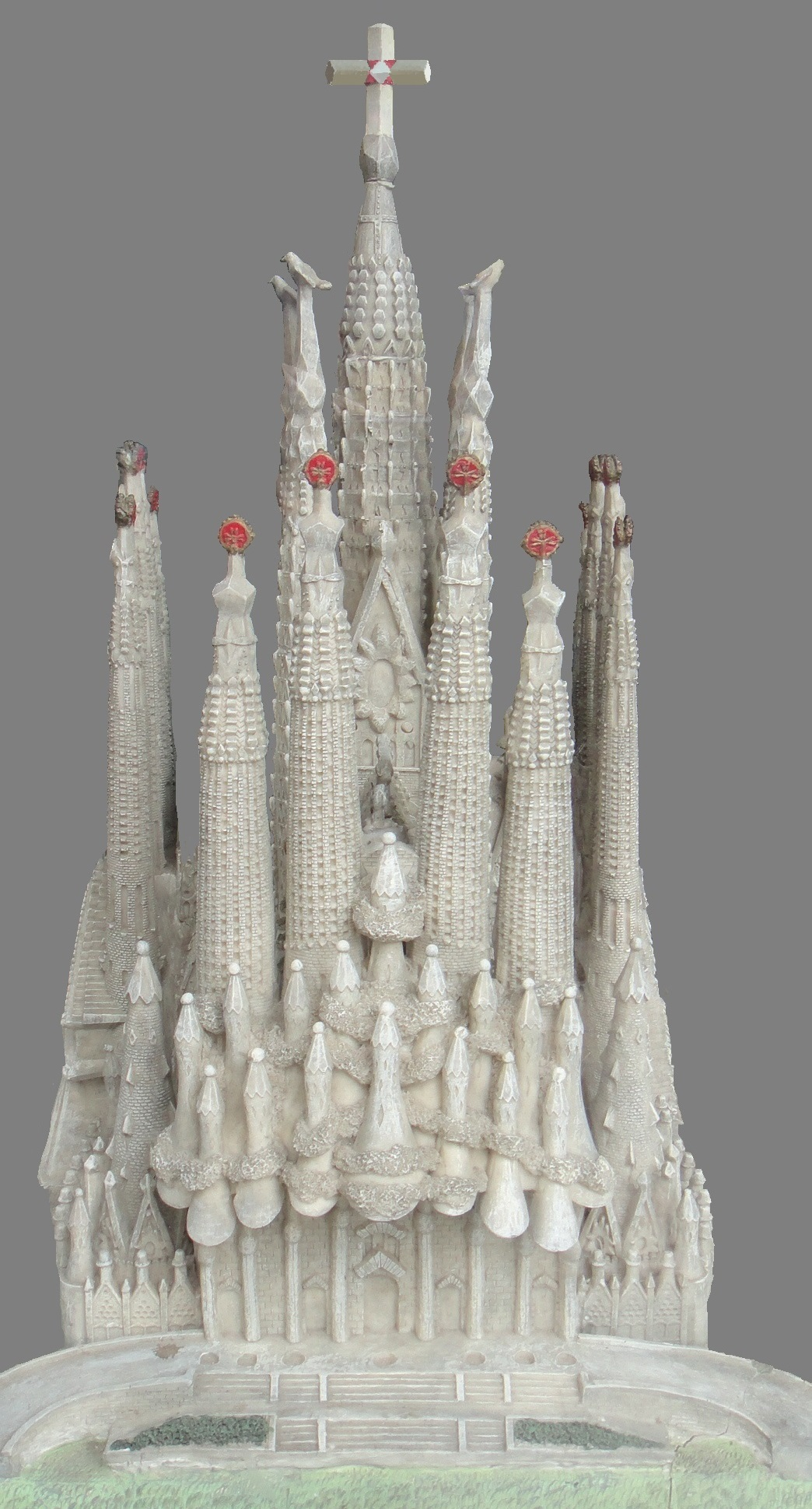
Model showing the entrance as wished by Gaudí "Lead us not into temptation".

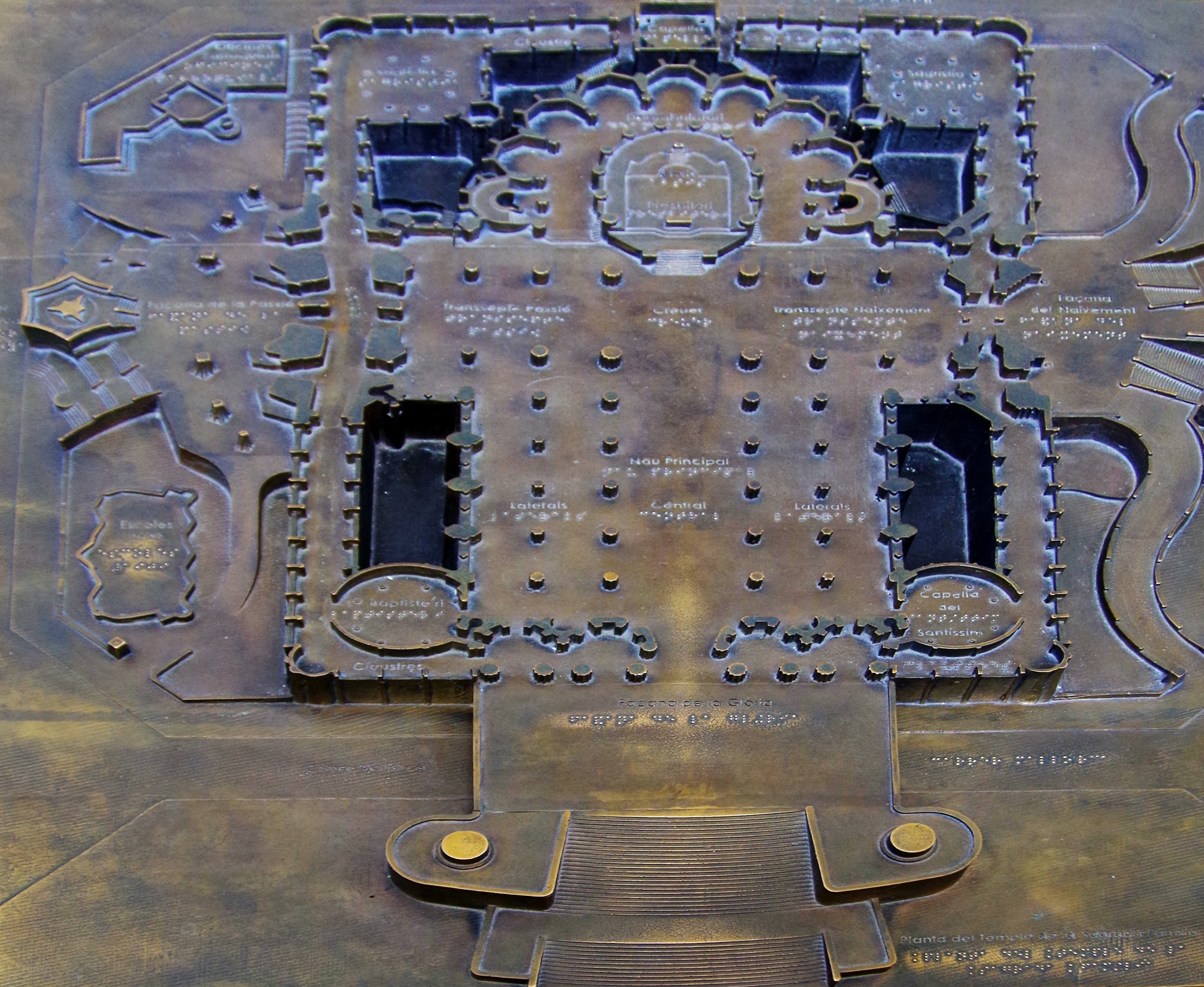
Ground model, showing Carrer de Mallorca running underground.

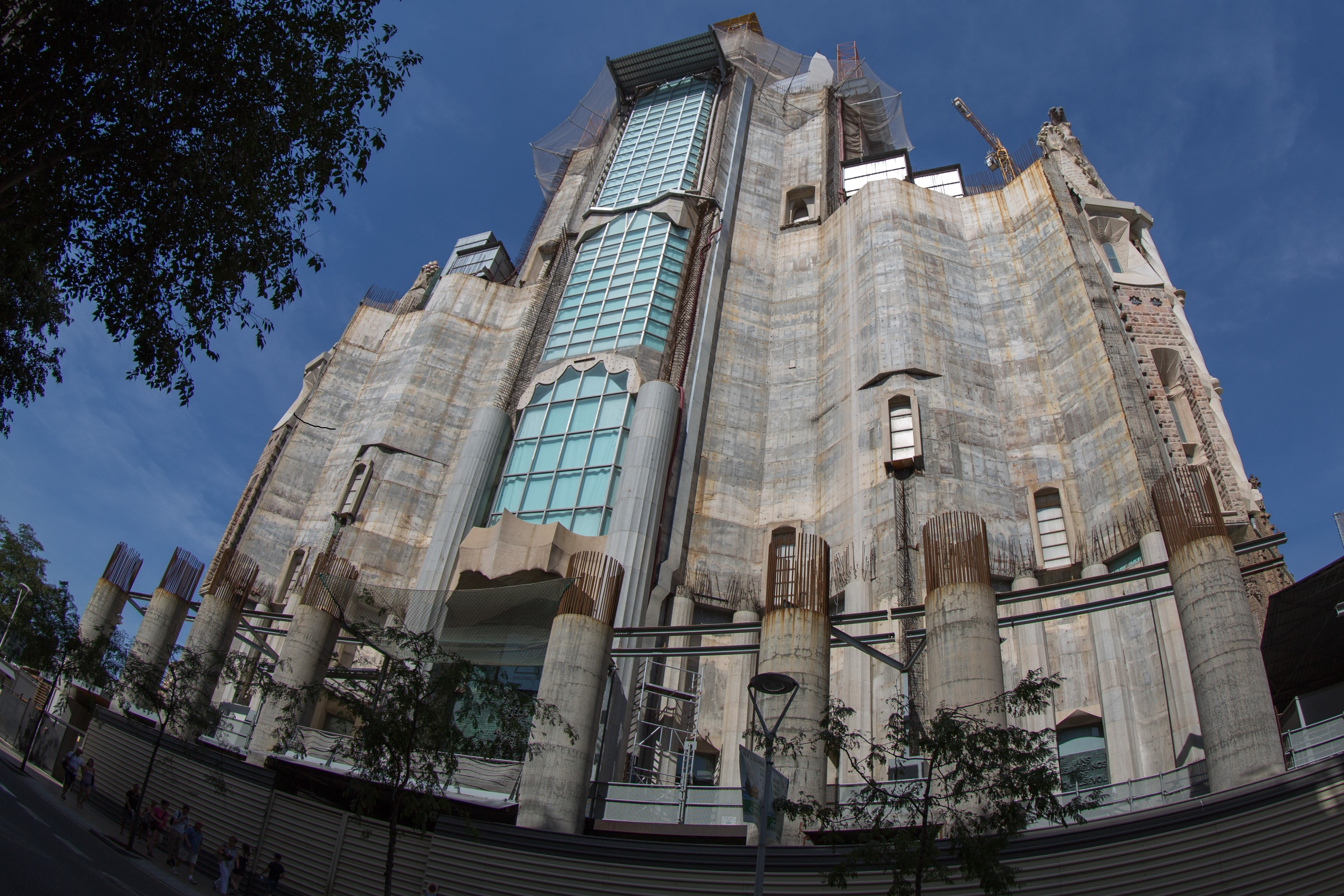
Glory Façade under construction in 2016

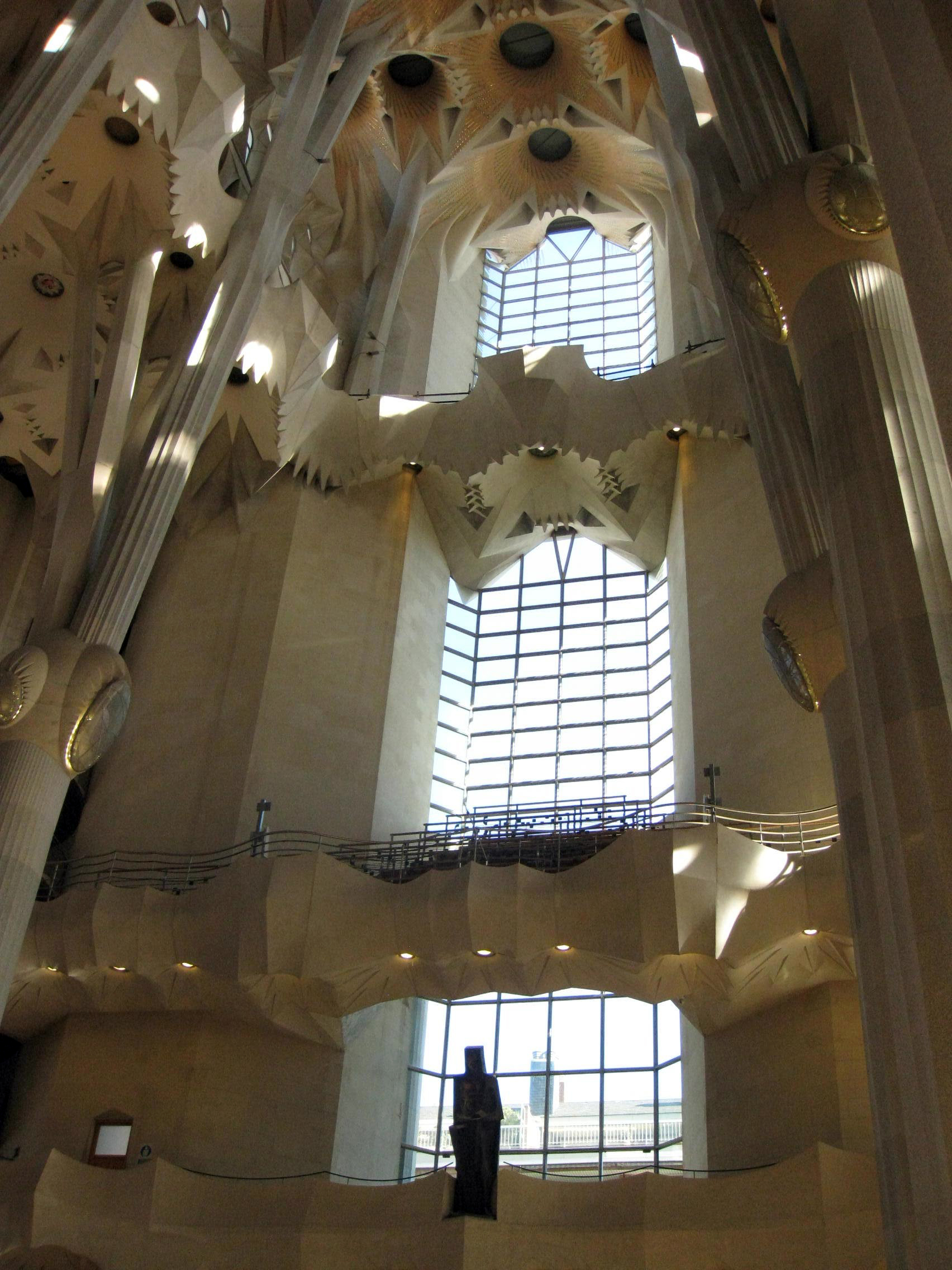
The Glory Façade from inside

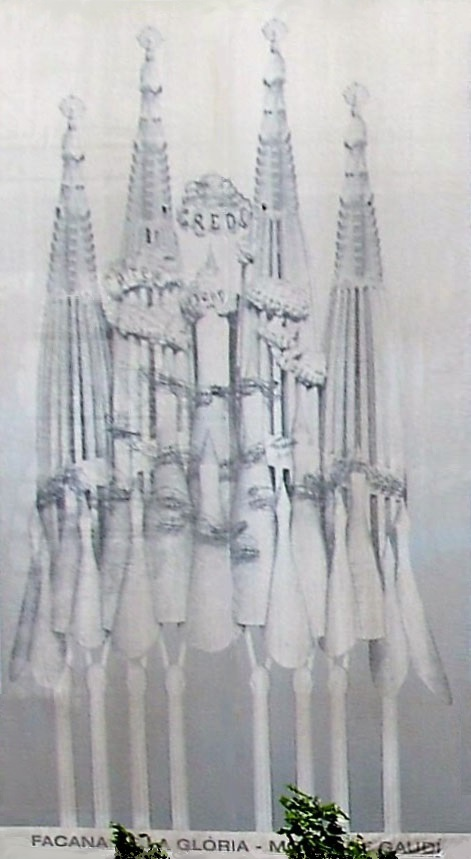
Drawing of the façade, once exposed on site

To reach the Glory Portico, which is 13 feet above street level, a large staircase is intended to be built that will lead over the underground passage built over Carrer de Mallorca with the decoration representing Hell and vice. On other projects, Carrer de Mallorca will have to go underground. It is planned to be decorated with demons, idols, false gods, heresy and schisms, etc. Purgatory and death will also be depicted, the latter using tombs along the ground. The portico will have seven large columns dedicated to gifts of the Holy Spirit. At the base of the columns there will be representations of the seven deadly sins, and at the top, the seven heavenly virtues.

- Gifts: wisdom, understanding, counsel, fortitude, knowledge, piety and fear of the Lord.
- Sins: greed, lust, pride, gluttony, sloth, wrath, envy.
- Virtues: kindness, diligence, patience, charity, temperance, humility, chastity.

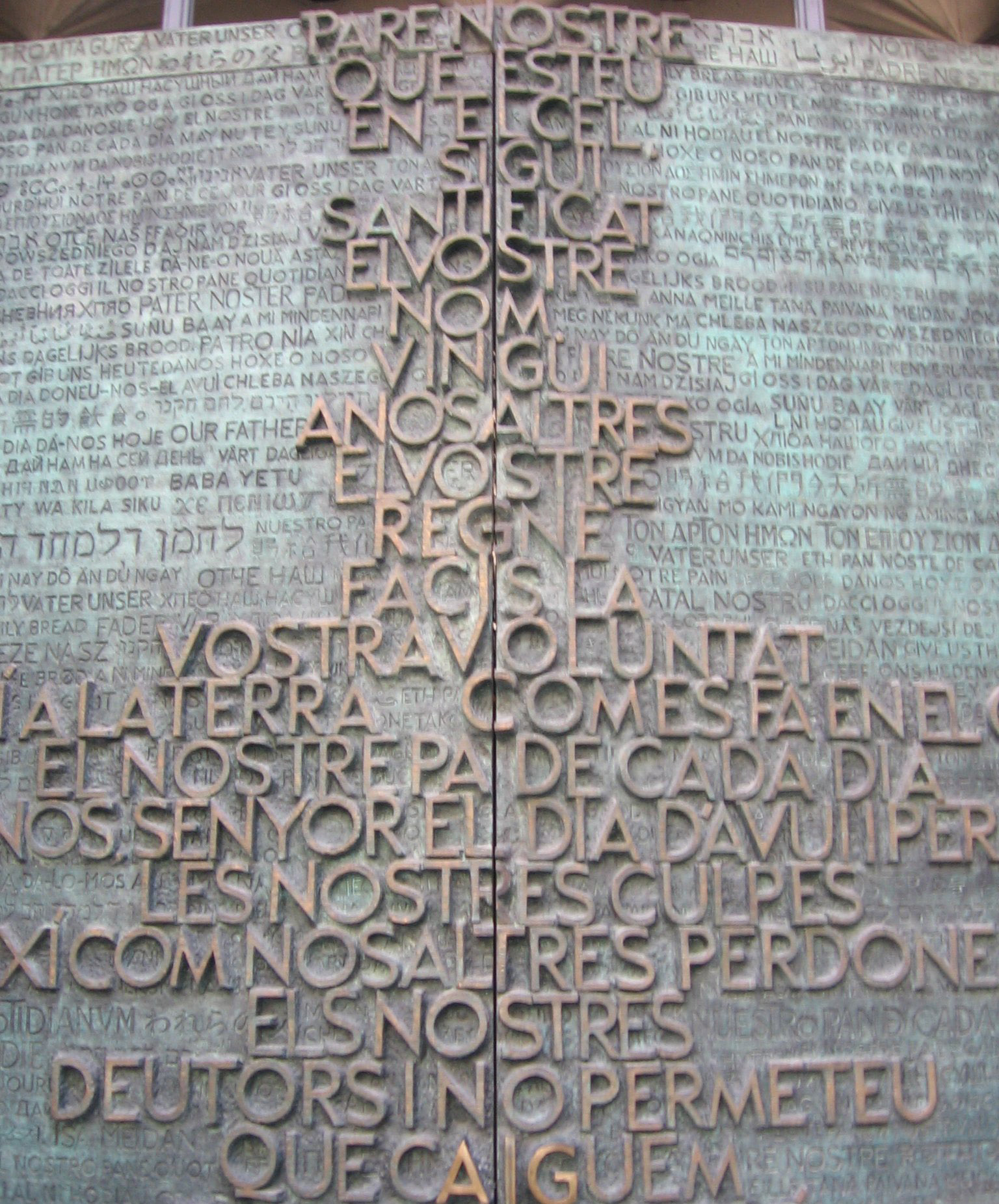
Eucharist Door of the Glory Façade showing, at bottom, the "A...G" for Antoni Gaudí

This façade will have five doors corresponding to the five naves of the temple, with the central one having a triple entrance, that will give the Glory Façade a total seven doors representing the sacraments:

- Baptism
- Confirmation
- Eucharist
- Penance
- Holy orders
- Marriage
- Anointing of the sick

In September 2008, the doors of the Glory façade, by Subirachs, were installed. These central doors bear the text of the Our Father prayer in Catalan in high relief, accompanied with the words "Our Father" and "Give us this day our daily bread" inscribed in fifty different languages. The handles of the door are the letters "A" and "G", forming the initials of Antoni Gaudí, within the phrase no permeteu que caiguem en la temptació ("lead us not into temptation").

=== Interior ===
Interior of Sagrada Família

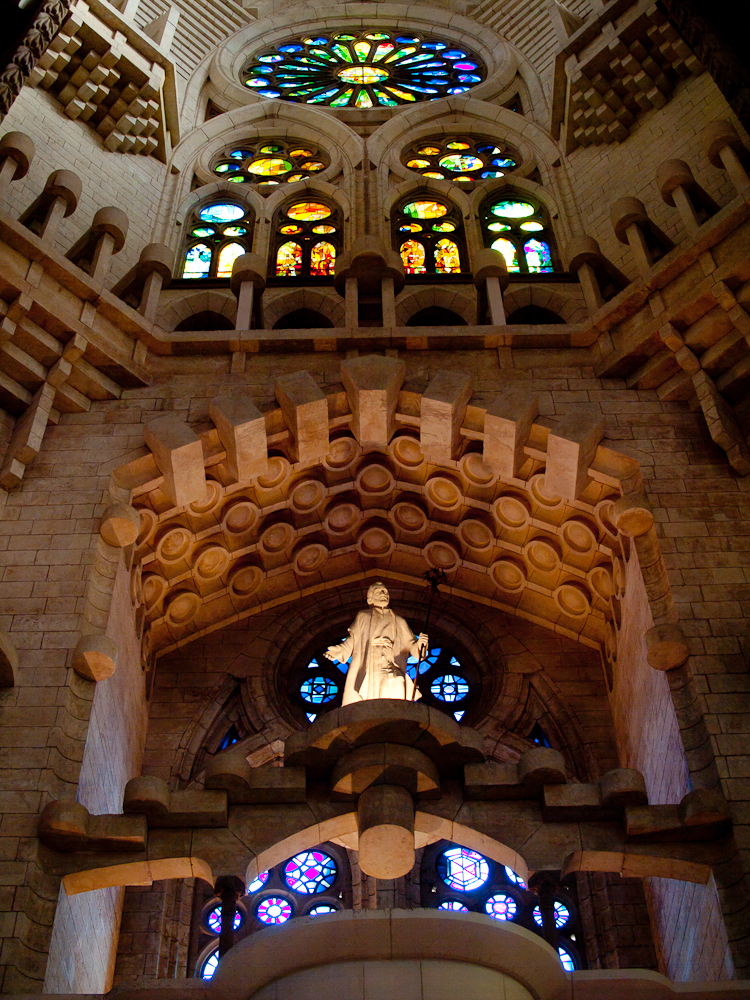
Standing in the transept and looking northeast

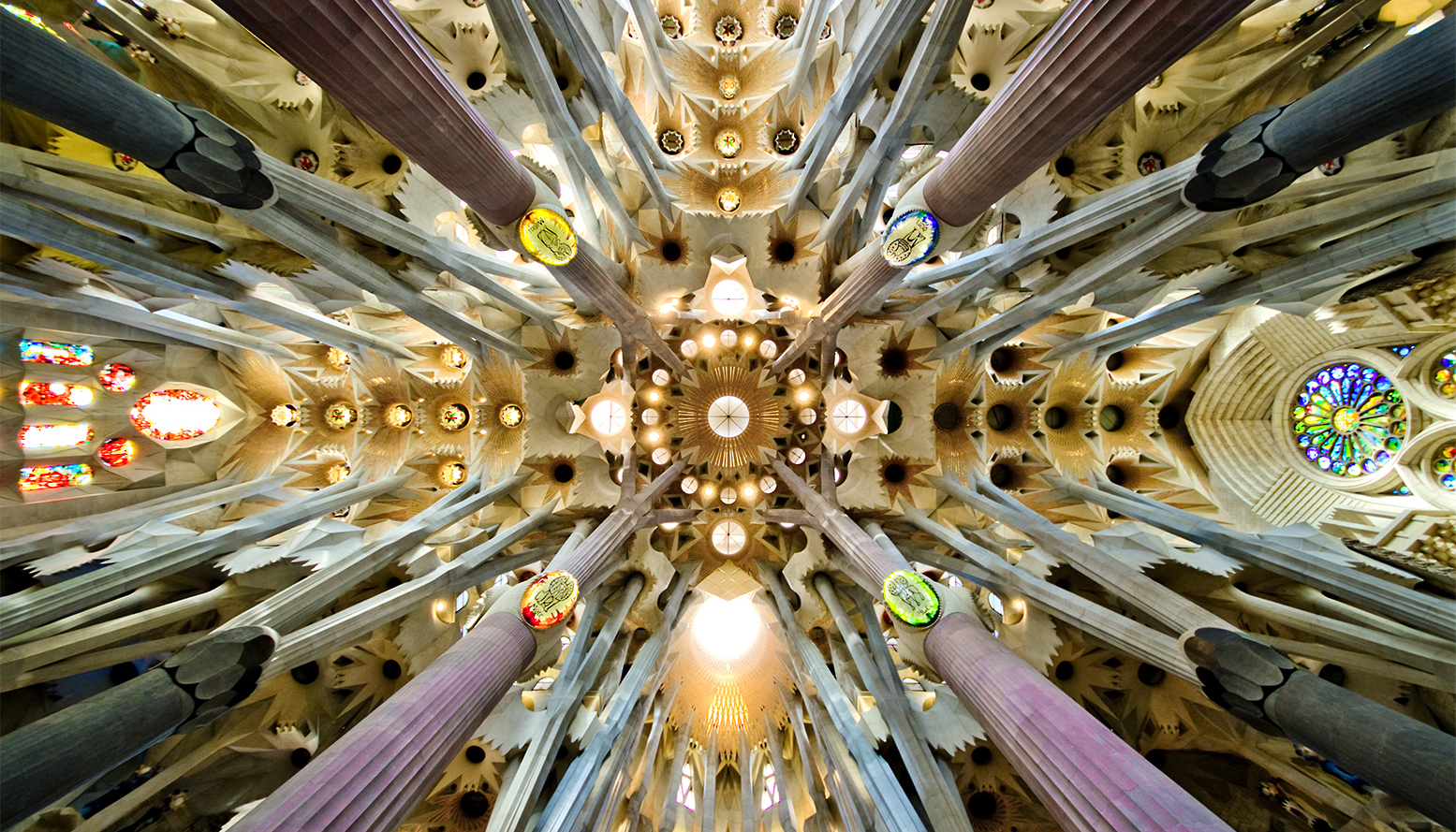
Detail of the ceiling in the nave. Gaudí designed the columns to resemble trees and branches.

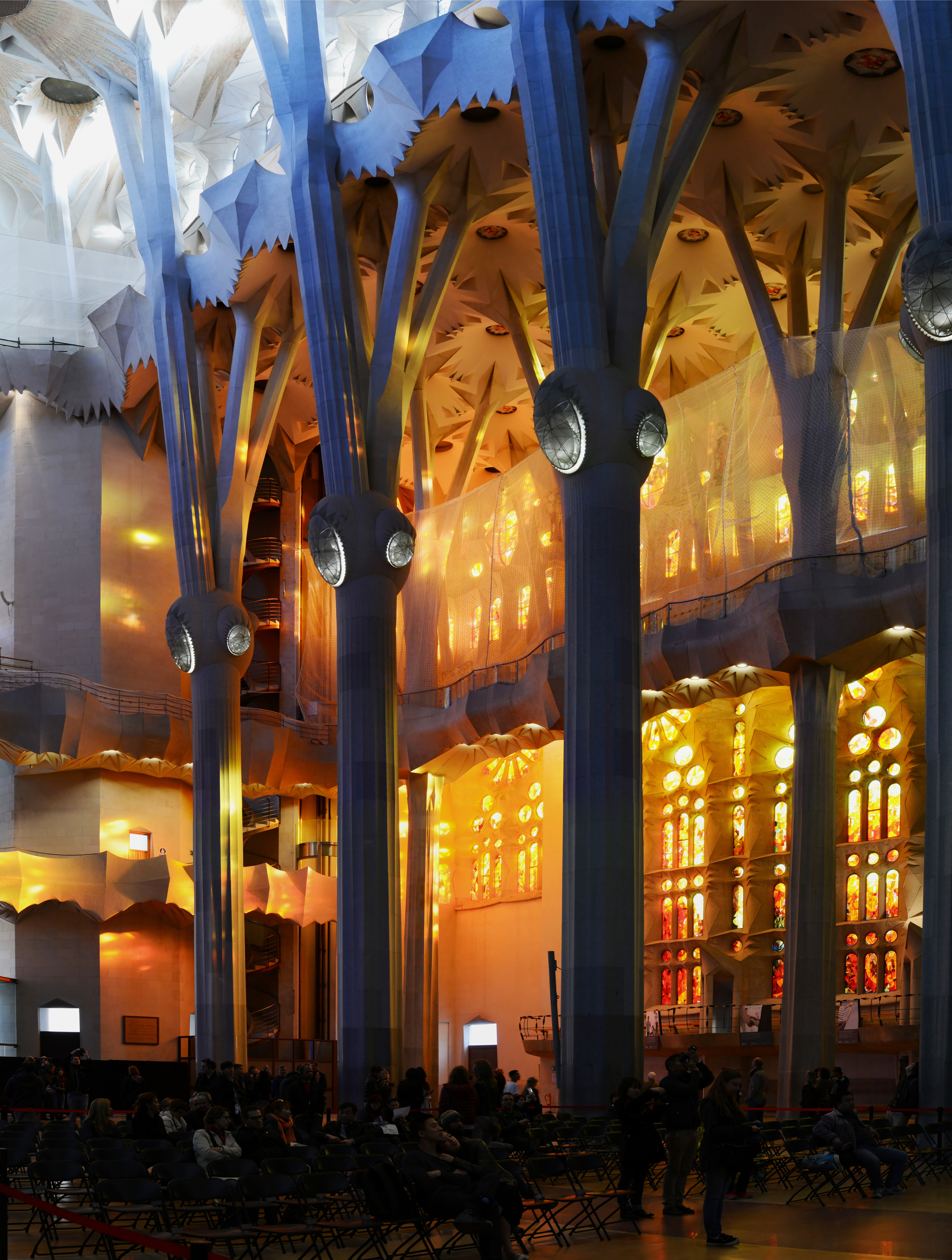
The nave

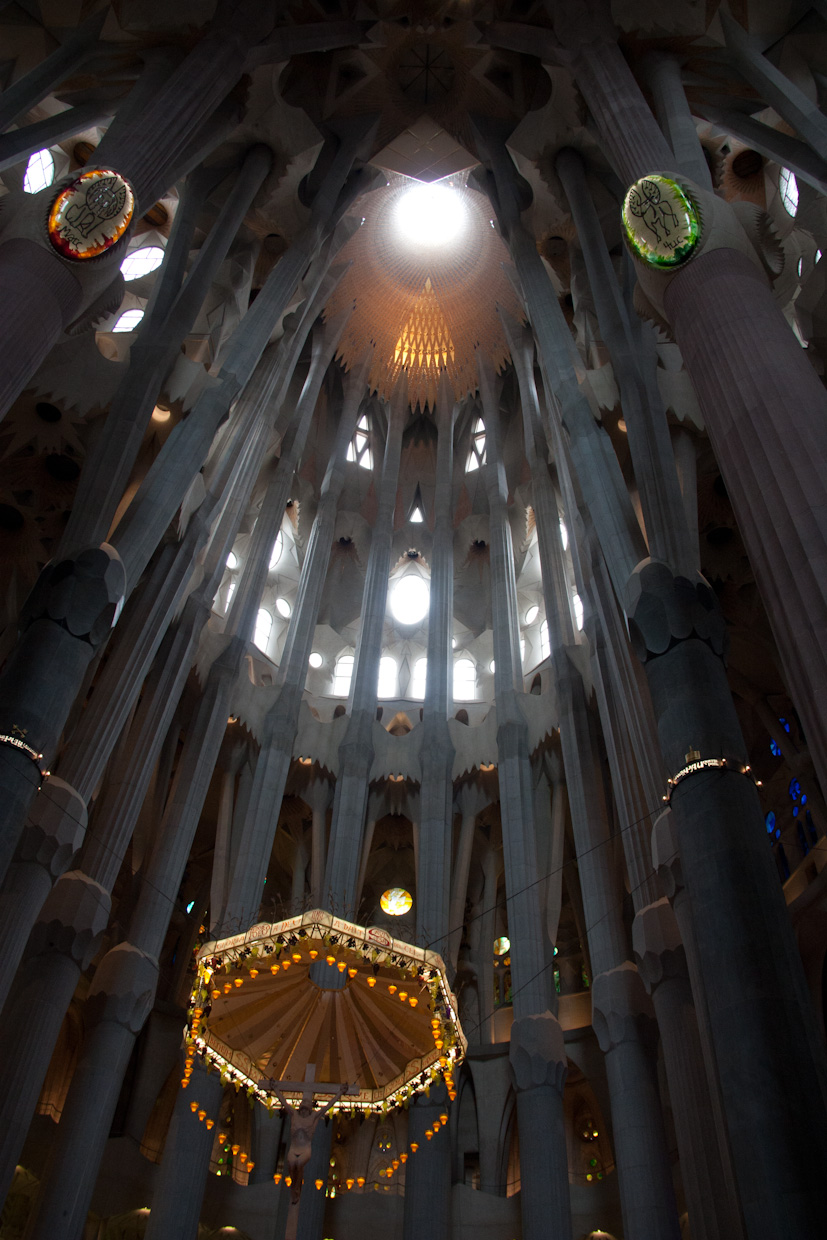
Ceiling of the apse (before installation of the stained-glass windows)

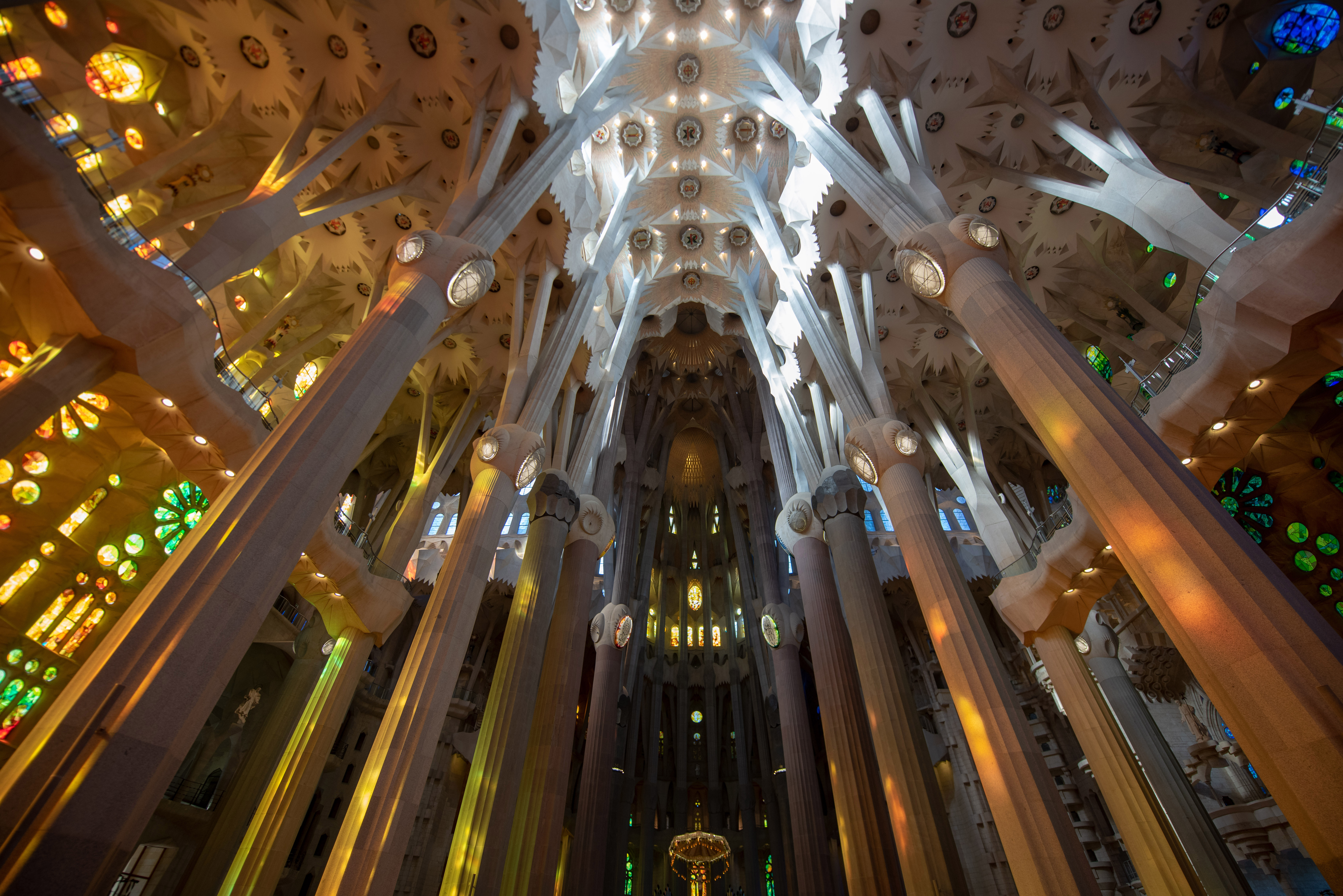
Ceiling and columns of the nave

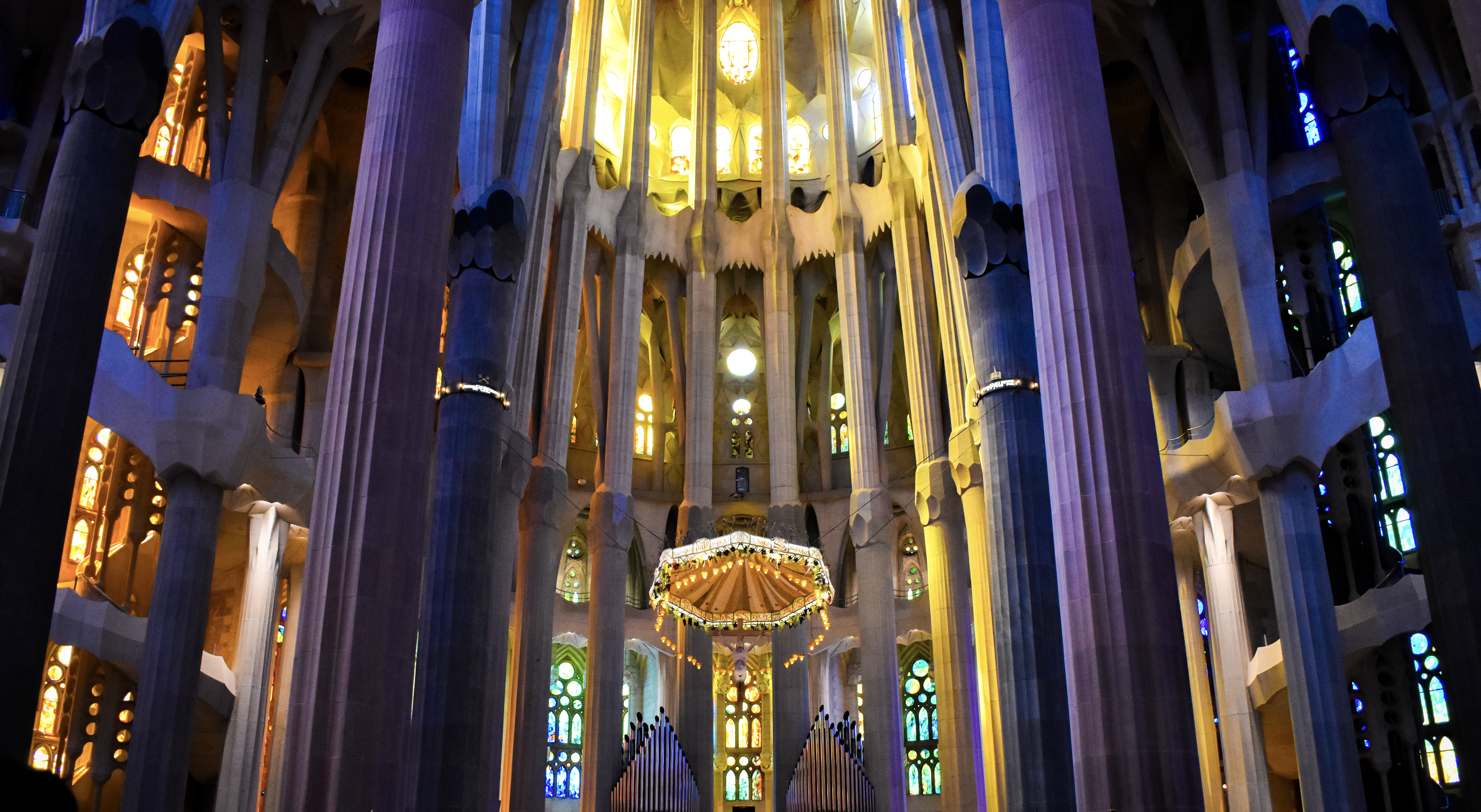
The apse

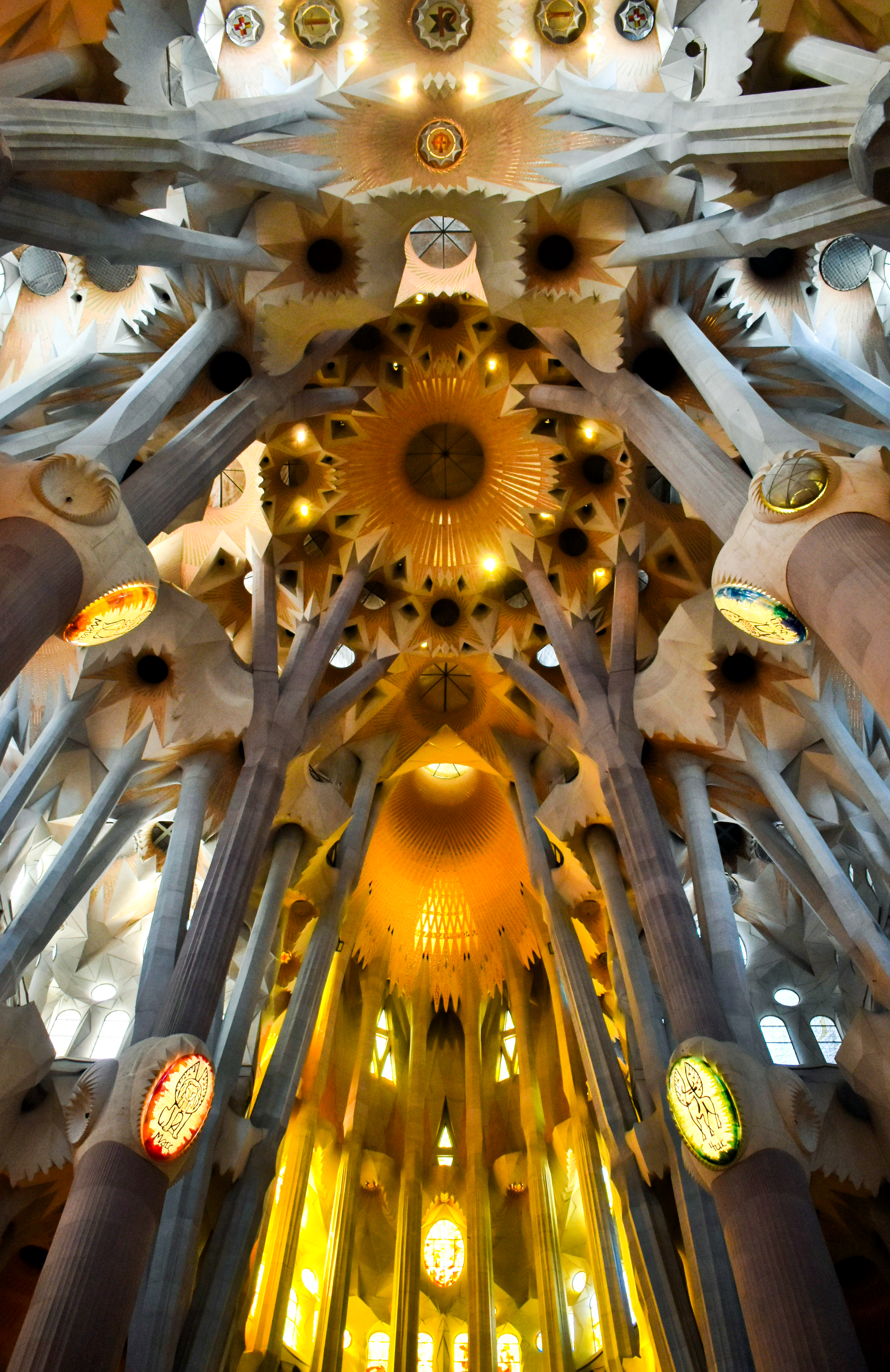
Apse ceiling, 2023

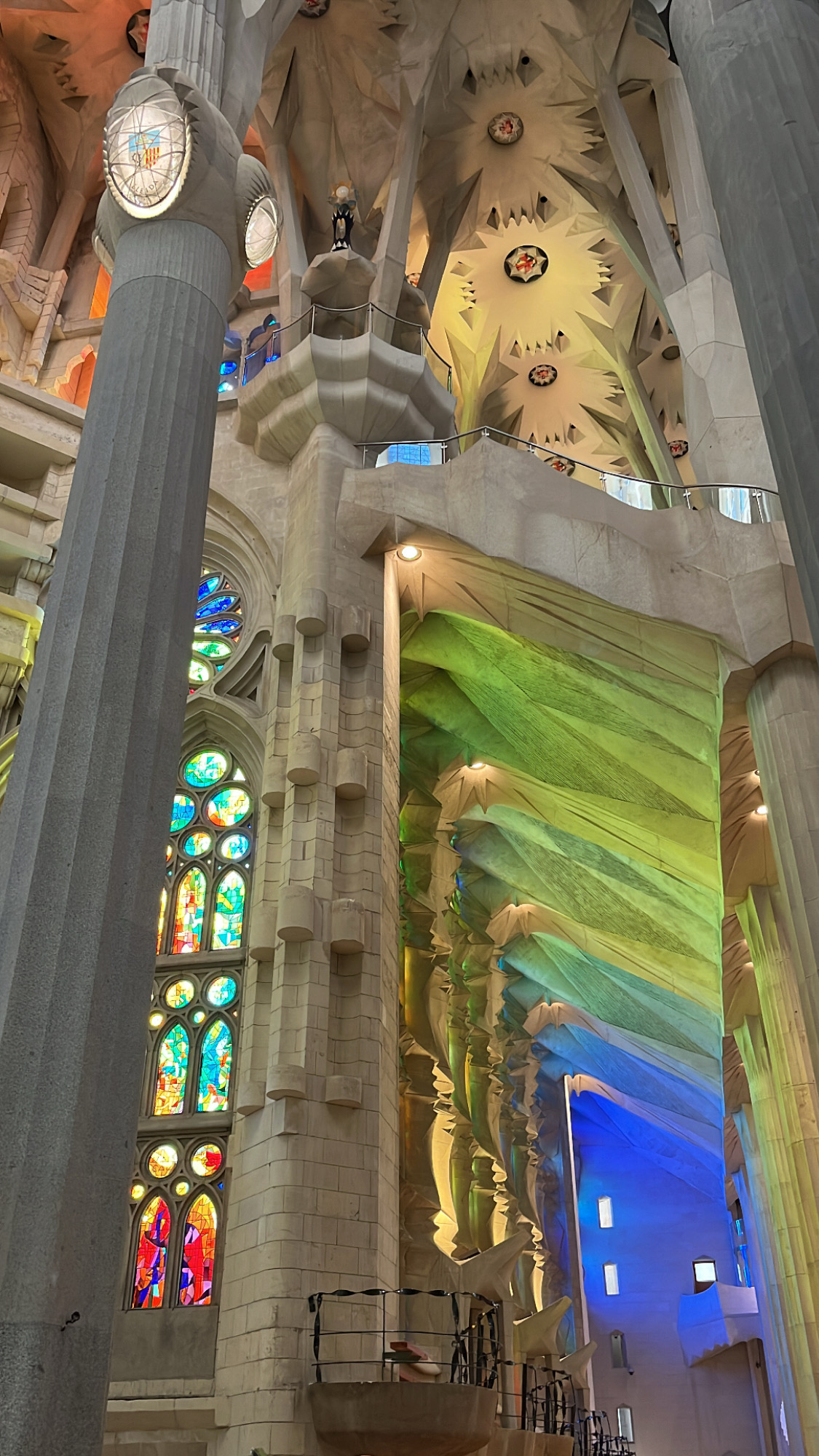
Light coming through stained glass

The church plan is that of a Latin cross with five aisles. The central nave vaults reach forty-five metres (148 feet) while the side nave vaults reach thirty metres (98 feet). The transept has three aisles. The columns are on a 7.5 metres (25 ft) grid. However, the columns of the apse, resting on del Villar's foundation, do not adhere to the grid, requiring a section of columns of the ambulatory to transition to the grid thus creating a horseshoe pattern to the layout of those columns. The crossing rests on the four central columns of porphyry supporting a great hyperboloid surrounded by two rings of twelve hyperboloids (currently under construction). The central vault reaches sixty metres (200 ft). The apse is capped by a hyperboloid vault reaching seventy-five metres (246 ft). Gaudí intended that a visitor standing at the main entrance be able to see the vaults of the nave, crossing, and apse, thus the graduated increase in vault loft.

There are gaps in the floor of the apse, providing a view into the crypt below.

The columns of the interior are a unique Gaudí design. Besides branching to support their load, their ever-changing surfaces are the result of the intersection of various geometric forms. The simplest example is that of a square base evolving into an octagon as the column rises, then a sixteen-sided form, and eventually to a circle. This effect is the result of a three-dimensional intersection of helicoidal columns (for example a square cross-section column twisting clockwise and a similar one twisting counterclockwise).

Essentially none of the interior surfaces are flat; the ornamentation is comprehensive and rich, consisting in large part of abstract shapes which combine smooth curves and jagged points. Even detail-level work such as the iron railings for balconies and stairways are full of curvaceous elaboration.

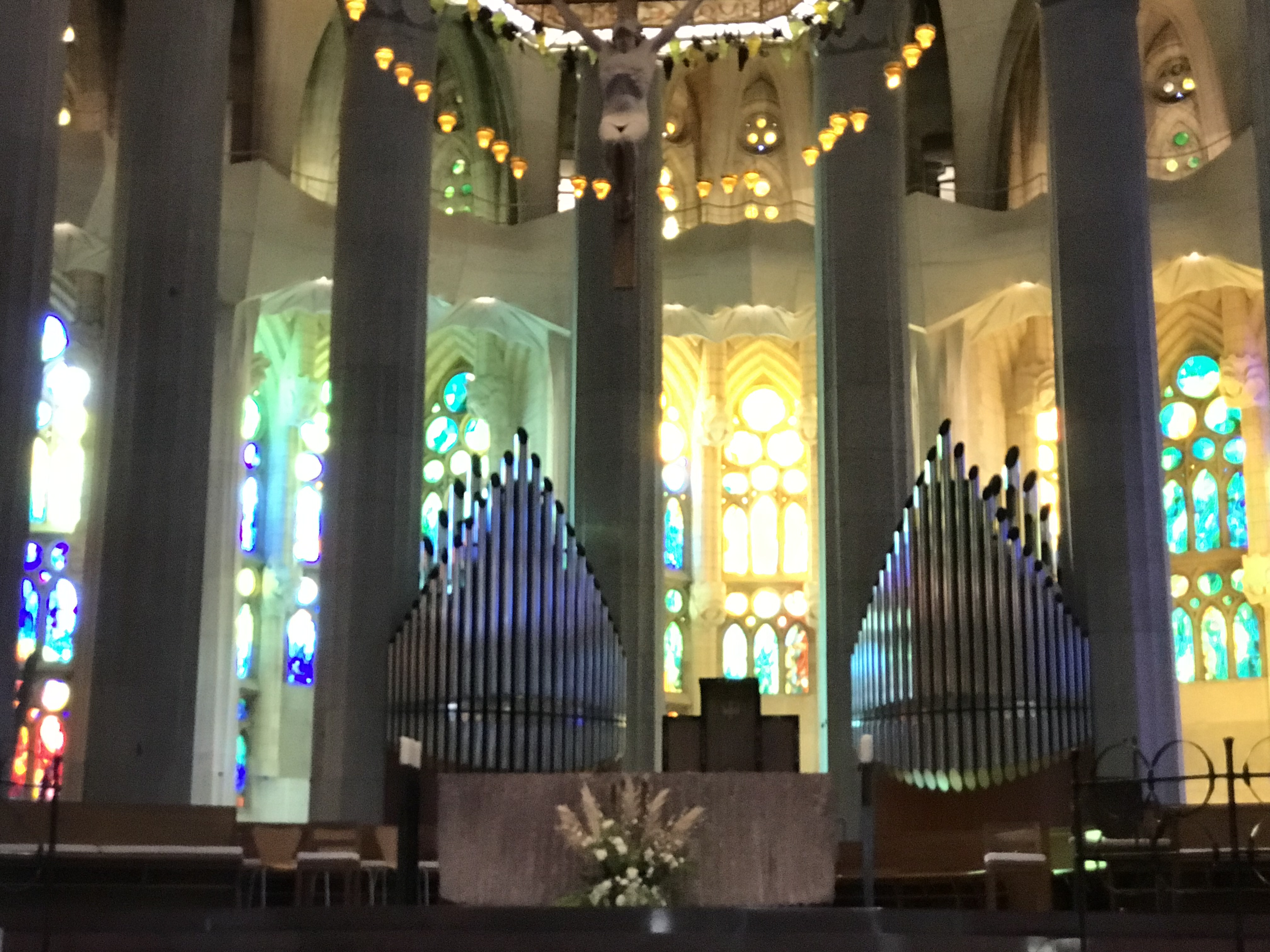
Organ located in the chancel

==== Organ ====
In 2010 an organ was installed in the chancel by the Blancafort Orgueners de Montserrat organ builders. The instrument has 26 stops (1,492 pipes) on two manuals and a pedalboard.

To overcome the unique acoustical challenges posed by the church's architecture and vast size, several additional organs will be installed at various points within the building. These instruments will be playable separately (from their own individual consoles) and simultaneously (from a single mobile console), yielding an organ of some 8,000 pipes when completed.

=== Geometric details ===
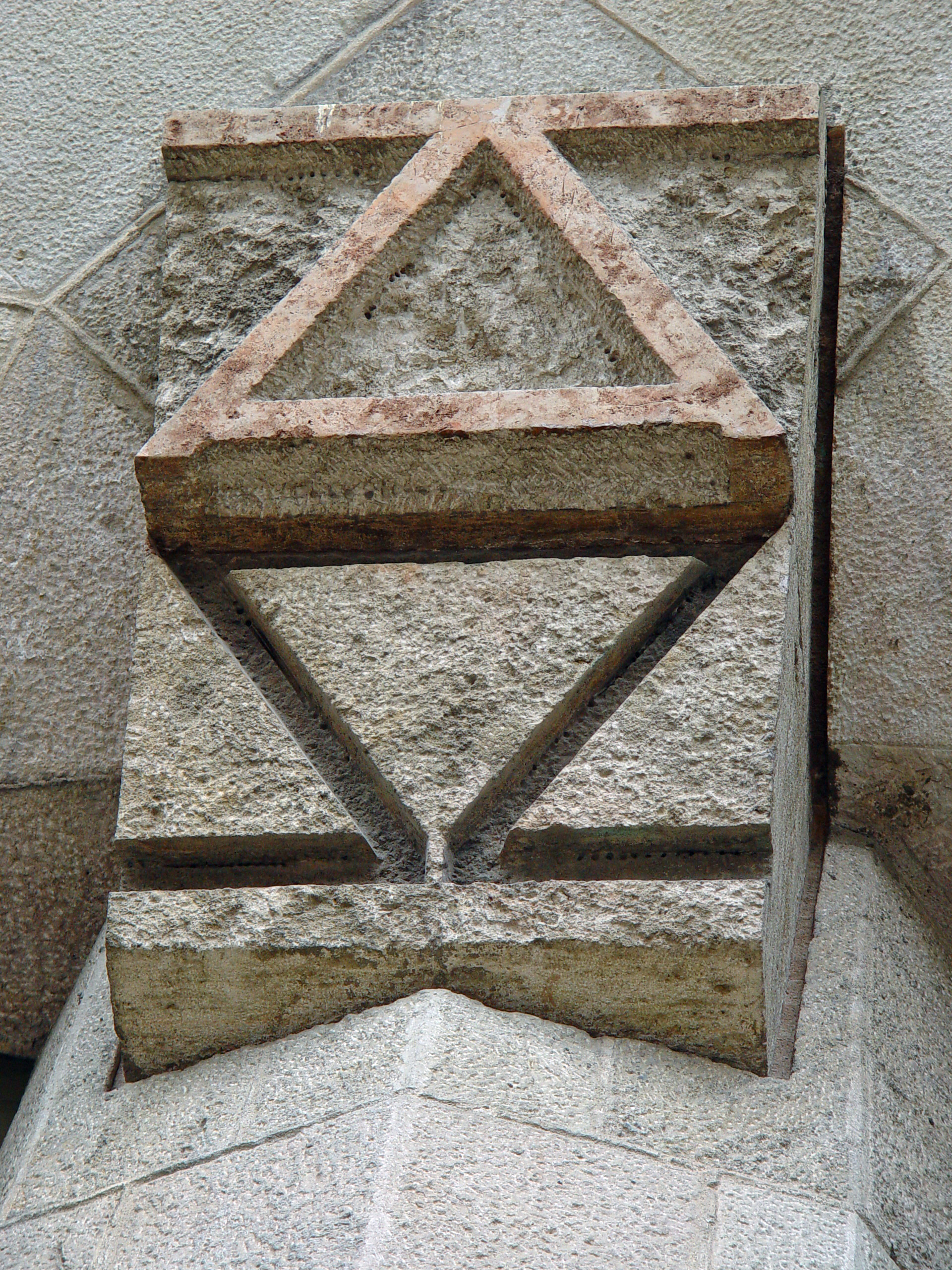
Alpha and Omega carving at Sagrada Família entrance

The steeples on the Nativity façade are crowned with geometrically shaped tops that are reminiscent of Cubism (they were finished around 1930), and the intricate decoration is contemporary to the style of Art Nouveau, but Gaudí's unique style drew primarily from nature, not other artists or architects, and resists categorization.

Gaudí used hyperboloid structures in later designs for Sagrada Família (more obviously after 1914). However, there are a few places on the nativity façade—a design not equated with Gaudí's ruled-surface design—where the hyperboloid appears. For example, all around the scene with the pelican, there are numerous examples (including the basket held by one of the figures). There is a hyperboloid adding structural stability to the cypress tree (by connecting it to the bridge). Finally, the "bishop's mitre" spires are capped with hyperboloid structures. In his later designs, ruled surfaces are prominent in the nave's vaults and windows and the surfaces of the Passion façade.

=== Symbolism ===
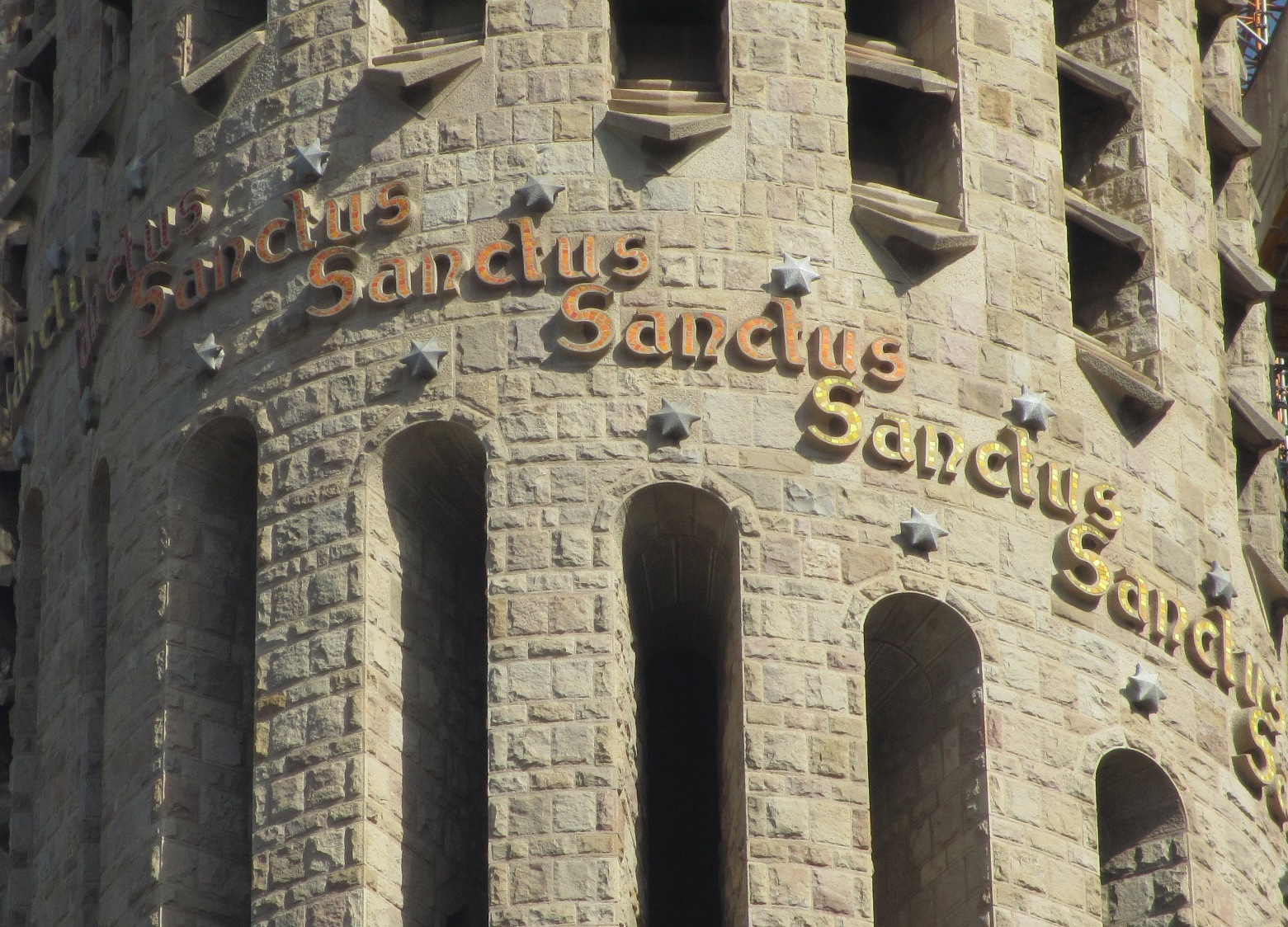
Detail of a steeple of the Passion Façade decorated with the word Sanctus

Themes throughout the decoration include words from the liturgy. The steeples are decorated with words such as "Hosanna", "Excelsis", and "Sanctus"; the great doors of the Passion façade reproduce excerpts of the Passion of Jesus from the New Testament in various languages, mainly Catalan; and the Glory façade is to be decorated with the words from the Apostles' Creed, while its main door reproduces the entire Lord's Prayer in Catalan, surrounded by multiple variations of "Give us this day our daily bread" in other languages. The three entrances symbolize the three virtues: Faith, Hope and Love. Each of them is also dedicated to a part of Christ's life. The Nativity Façade is dedicated to his birth; it also has a cypress tree which symbolizes the tree of life. The Glory façade is dedicated to his Christ's glory period. The Passion façade is symbolic of Christ's suffering. The apse steeple bears Latin text of the Hail Mary prayer.

Areas of the sanctuary will be designated to represent various concepts, such as saints, virtues and sins, and secular concepts such as regions, presumably with decoration to match.

=== Burials ===
- José María Bocabella
- Antoni Gaudí

== Appraisal ==
The art historian Nikolaus Pevsner, writing in the 1960s, referred to Gaudí's buildings as growing "like sugar loaves and anthills" and describes the ornamenting of buildings with shards of broken pottery as possibly "bad taste" but handled with vitality and "ruthless audacity".

The building's design itself has been polarizing. Assessments by Gaudí's fellow architects were generally positive; Louis Sullivan greatly admired it, describing Sagrada Família as the "greatest piece of creative architecture in the last twenty-five years. It is spirit symbolised in stone!" Modernist architect Walter Gropius praised Sagrada Família, describing the building's walls as "a marvel of technical perfection". Time magazine called it "sensual, spiritual, whimsical, exuberant" in 1990. However, author and critic George Orwell, mistakenly referring to it as a cathedral, called it "one of the most hideous buildings in the world" in 1938. Author James A. Michener called it "one of the strangest-looking serious buildings in the world" and British historian Gerald Brenan stated about the building "Not even in the European architecture of the period can one discover anything so vulgar or pretentious." The building's distinctive silhouette has nevertheless become symbolic of Barcelona itself, drawing an estimated 3 million visitors annually by 1990 and 5 million in 2025. LEGO released its largest set ever in 2026, with 12,060 pieces forming a model of Sagrada Família.

=== World Heritage status ===
In 1984, UNESCO granted World Heritage Site designations to three Gaudí buildings in Barcelona, though not yet including Sagrada Família, under the collective designation "Works of Antoni Gaudí – No 320 bis" (items 320-001 to 320-003), testifying "to Gaudí's exceptional creative contribution to the development of architecture and building technology", "having represented el Modernisme of Catalonia" and "anticipated and influenced many of the forms and techniques that were relevant to the development of modern construction in the 20th century". In 2005, UNESCO extended the inscription for Works of Antoni Gaudí – No 320 bis to include four additional buildings in Barcelona, with item 320-005 listed as two specific sections of Sagrada Família: the Crypt and the Nativity façade.

== Visitor access ==
Visitors can access the nave, crypt, museum, shop, and the Passion and Nativity steeples. Entrance to either of the steeples requires a reservation and advance purchase of a ticket. Access is possible only by lift (elevator) and a short walk up the remainder of the steeples to the bridge between the steeples. Descent is via a very narrow spiral staircase of over 300 steps. There is a posted caution for those with medical conditions.

As of June 2017, online ticket purchase has been available. As of August 2010, there had been a service whereby visitors could buy an entry code either at Servicaixa ATM kiosks (part of CaixaBank) or online.

=== International masses ===
The Archdiocese of Barcelona holds an international mass at the Basilica of the Sagrada Família every Sunday and on holy days of obligation.

- Date and time: Every Sunday and on holy days of obligation at 9 am.
- There is no charge for attending mass but capacity is limited.
- Visitors are asked to dress appropriately and behave respectfully.

== Funding and building permit ==
Construction on Sagrada Família is not supported by any government or official church sources. Private patrons funded the initial stages. Money from tickets purchased by tourists is now used to pay for the work, and private donations are accepted.

The construction budget for 2009 was €18 million.

In October 2018, Sagrada Família trustees agreed to pay city authorities €36 million for a building permit, after 136 years of unlicensed construction. Most of the funds would be directed to improve the access between the church and the Barcelona Metro. The permit was issued by the city on 7 June 2019.

== Incidents ==
On 19 April 2011, an arsonist started a small fire in the sacristy which forced the evacuation of tourists and construction workers. The sacristy was damaged, and the fire took 45 minutes to contain.

In August 2017, Barcelona was the target of a series of terrorist attacks with Islamist motivations, commonly referred to as the La Rambla attacks. Investigations later revealed that one of the original targets was the Sagrada Família basilica. The attackers had planned to detonate a van loaded with gas canisters at the site during peak visiting hours to cause maximum damage. However, the plan was abandoned after an accidental explosion involving the gas canisters occurred in Alcanar, in southern Catalonia, days before the main attack.

On 11 March 2020, during the COVID-19 pandemic in Spain, construction temporarily stopped and the basilica was closed. This was the first time the construction had been halted since the Spanish Civil War. The basilica reopened, initially to key workers, on 4 July 2020.

=== Stairway and avenue disputes ===
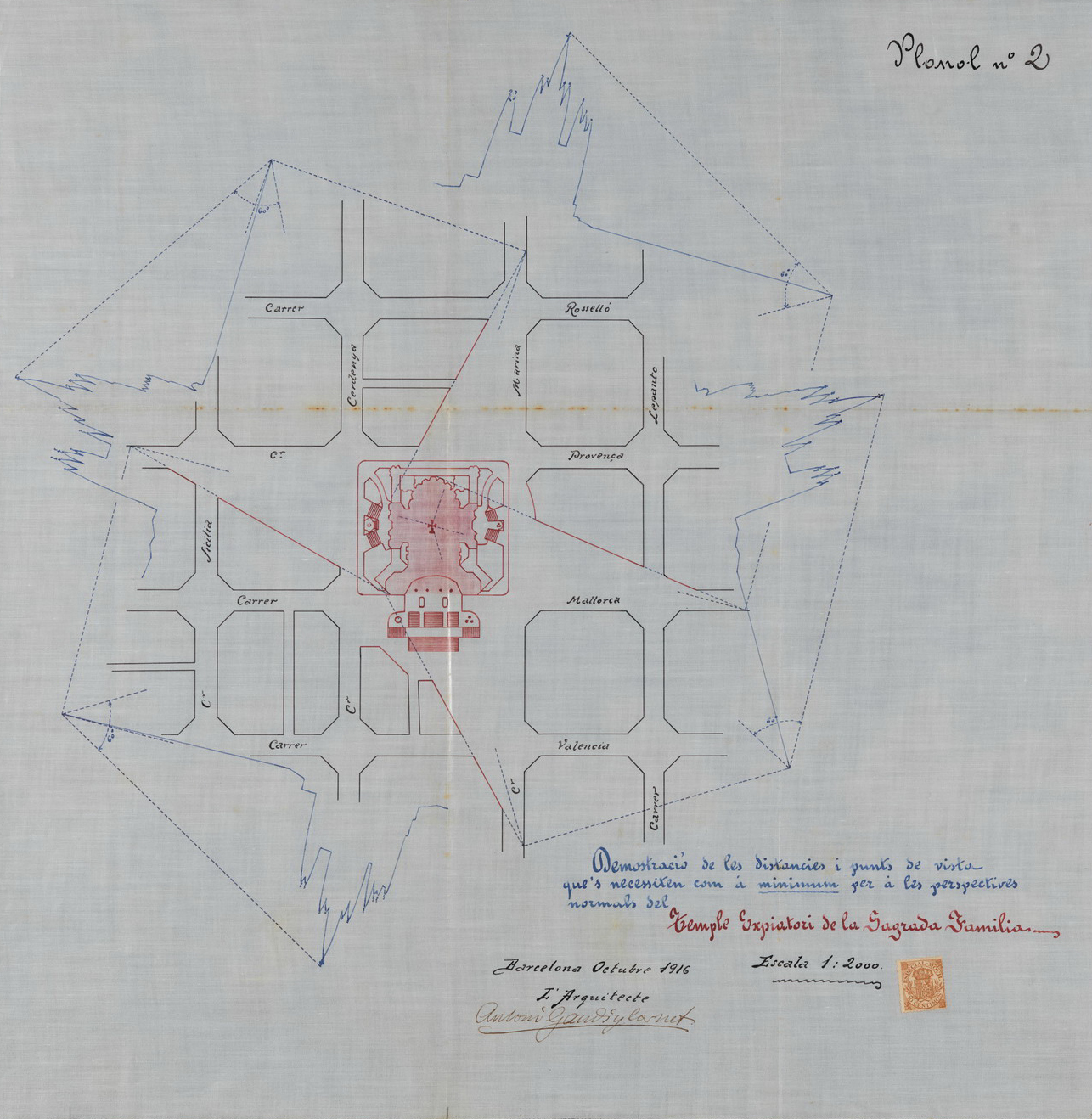
First design of the star-shaped avenues surrounding the basilica, by Gaudí (1916)

Given the Sagrada Família was built elevated, the main entrance (Glory Façade) stands 5 metres (16 ft) taller than the street (C/ Mallorca). Although Gaudí's plans are disputed (given that he first designed star-shaped avenues leading to the basilica), the Construction Board asserts that Gaudi's last plans were to build a long 57 metres (187 ft) stairway passing over Carrer de Mallorca and leading into a 2-block avenue from the basilica to Diagonal Avenue. Local residents maintain concerns about this, as the demolition of two city blocks would result in the losses of about 3,000 homes as well as some businesses.

Currently, there are talks between the Construction Board, the City Council and Neighbours' Associations to try to find the best solution, which is worsened by the current Spanish housing crisis. However, Barcelona's still-legal 1976 urban master plan (Plan General Metropolitano) defines the 2-block area as part of the Sagrada Família, and states that housing was not supposed to be constructed there. In 2019, the Construction Board bought land nearby, and mayor Jaume Collboni implied they would have to fund the relocation of affected residents in order to demolish the two blocks.

== See also ==
- List of Catholic basilicas
- List of Gaudí buildings
- List of Modernista buildings in Barcelona
- Sagrada Família (Barcelona Metro)
