= Clare Emma Whitty =

Irish Anglican nun, missionary and botanist

Mother Superior Mother Mary Clare, CSP
- Mother Superior of the Society of the Holy Cross
- Church: Church of Ireland
- Installed: 1925; Rt Revd Mark Trollope, 3rd Bishop in Korea
- Predecessor: newly created position

Personal details
- Born: 30 May 1883 Fenloe, County Clare, Ireland
- Died: 6 November 1950 (aged 67) Chunggangjin, North Korea

Mother Mary Clare (born Clare Emma Whitty; 30 May 1883 – 6 November 1950) was an Irish Anglican nun, missionary and botanist who died during a nine-day death march led by retreating North Korean soldiers during the Korean War.

She arrived in Korea in 1923, one of eighteen missionaries sent to the Korean Peninsula by her nursing order, the Community of St Peter between 1892 and 1950. In 1925, following the founding of the Society of the Holy Cross by the Rt Revd Mark Trollope, the third Bishop in Korea, she was appointed Mother Superior of the order.

== Early life ==
According to her birth certificate, Clare Emma Whitty was born on 30 May 1883 in Fenloe, County Clare, Ireland. Some secondary sources erroneously report that she was born in Enniskerry, County Wicklow, Ireland. Her father, Richard Laurence Whitty, a qualified medical doctor and land agent, was born in 1844 in Rathvilly, County Carlow, to a clerical family. He was the youngest of four children, to Reverend William Whitty, curate of Rathvilly, and his wife Gertrude (née Langley). Her mother was Jane Alicia Whitty (née Hickman), who was from a family of County Clare landowners. Through her mother, she was the great granddaughter of Edward Stopford, Bishop of Meath, making her a distant cousin of Irish historian, Alice Stopford Green. She had three siblings: a brother born in Fenloe on 14 May 1876, and two older sisters, Sophia Angel St John Whitty, born on 4 November 1877 in Dublin, who was named after their maternal grandmother, and Katherine Llandaff Whitty born on 3 January 1881 at Hillcot, Whitechurch, County Dublin. In the 1891 census, the family is recorded to have moved to Loughton, Essex, England. In the 1911 census, Whitty is recorded as an "elementary teacher" living in Bordesley, Birmingham. Before that she received training in art in Paris, and she became a fluent speaker of French.

== Sisterhood ==
In 1912, Whitty joined the Anglican Community of St Peter, then based in Kilburn, London and took her vows as a sister in 1915, taking the name, Mary Clare. The Rev'd Mark Trollope who had been vicar of St Alban's Church, Bordesley, was in 1911 consecrated the third Anglican Bishop in Korea, and some years later requested that Whitty (then Sister Mary Clare) should come to Korea to aid him in the founding of a society of Korean sisters in Seoul. She eventually reached Korea in 1923, following the difficulties placed upon travel following the war, she undertook Korean language studies. She is believed to be the first recorded Irish-born woman to have lived in Korea.

In 1925 in Seoul, with the help of Trollope, Sister Mary Clare founded the Society of the Holy Cross and was appointed novice mistress, later becoming the first mother superior of the order.

== Death ==
During the Korean War, Whitty refused the opportunity from the British embassy to evacuate from Seoul, instead opting to stay with her congregation. Following her capture by retreating North Korean forces, she died on 6 November 1950 near Chunggangjin (present day North Korea) during a death march which had begun on 30 October.

== Bibliography ==
In 1929, Mother Mary Clare contributed two articles to the 29th volume of the journal of the Royal Asiatic Society Korea Branch, which she contributed as A sister of the Community of St. Peter.

- A sister of the Community of St. Peter, (Sister Mary Clare) (1929). Some Wayside Flowers of Central Korea (XVIII:22–40) (PDF). Seoul, Korea: Royal Asiatic Society Korea Branch.
- A sister of the Community of St. Peter, (Sister Mary Clare) (1929). Herbae Koreanae, Being a First List of Some of the Commonest Herbaceous Plants Found in Korea. XVIII:43–82 (PDF). Seoul, Korea: Royal Asiatic Society Korea Branch.

== See also ==
- Anglican Church of Korea
- Community of St Peter
- Society of the Holy Cross (Korea)
