= Royal Asiatic Society Korea Branch =

First Korean studies organization

The seal-shaped emblem of the RAS-KB.

The Royal Asiatic Society Korea Branch (RAS-KB; Korean: 영국왕립아시아학회 한국지부) is a learned society based in Seoul, South Korea. Established in 1900 as the world's first Korean studies organization, it was founded to provide a platform for scholarly research on the history, culture and natural landscapes of the Korean Peninsula. It is thought to be the oldest English-language academic organization now existing that is devoted exclusively to the discipline known as Korean studies.

Its annual journal, Transactions of the Korea Branch of the Royal Asiatic Society, has been described as being "for much of the 20th century, the most important Western-language source on Korean culture."

The organization's seal consists of the following Chinese characters: 槿 (top right), 域 (bottom right), 菁 (top left), 莪 (bottom left), pronounced Kŭn yŏk Ch'ŏng A in Korean. The first two characters mean the hibiscus region, referring to Korea, while the other two (luxuriant mugwort) are a metaphor inspired by Confucian commentaries on the Chinese Book of Odes, and could be translated as "enjoy encouraging erudition".

== History ==
=== Early history ===
The Society was first established on June 16, 1900, when a founding meeting attended by seventeen men (all but four of them Protestant missionaries) was held in the Reading Room of the Seoul Union Club. On that day officers were elected and a constitution (based on that of the Royal Asiatic Society of Great Britain and Ireland) was adopted. The British RAS immediately acknowledged the establishment of the Korea Branch and authorized the use of its name. Among those present at the inaugural meeting were the acting British Chargé d'affaires, J. H. Gubbins, (who became the first president) and the missionaries James Scarth Gale, Homer B. Hulbert, George Heber Jones, Horace Grant Underwood, Henry Gerhard Appenzeller, D. A. Bunker and William B. Scranton. Other missionaries who were members of the RASKB from the very start included the medical doctors Horace N. Allen, Oliver R. Avison and the Anglican priest (later bishop) Mark Napier Trollope. Although most were not subjects of the British crown, many were intimately known to the Joseon royalty.

The Society's main activity was the presentation and discussion of scholarly papers by members at occasional meetings. The papers were then published in an annual journal titled Transactions of the Korea Branch of the Royal Asiatic Society.

From 1900 until the end of 1902, the Society met regularly, papers were presented and subsequently published. From early in 1903, however, its activities ceased and did not resume until a new president and council were elected early in 1911. Among the reasons for this interruption may be cited the death or departure from Korea of many of the founding members, and the troubling events of those years, including the Russo-Japanese War and the annexation of the Korean Empire by Japan in 1910.

After 1911, the Society resumed meeting and publishing Transactions until the outbreak of the Pacific War at the end of 1941. Shortly after the Japanese occupation began, the RASKB published three Japanese-authored papers, all three of which had colonialist agendas; the RASKB had no more to say officially on Japanese imperialism until after liberation in 1945.

Many of the papers published in Transactions continue to fascinate scholars of Korean culture even today. They cover a great variety of topics, ranging from the remotest origins of Korean culture, through descriptions of ancient monuments and temples, through lists of the plants and animals found in Korea, to surveys of gold-mining and ginseng-production.

During this period the Society established a lending library. After the surrender of Japan in 1945, the Society resumed its activities a few former members including Horace Horton Underwood returned to Korea.

The outbreak of the Korean War in June 1950 led to the suspension of its activities. The president for 1950, the Anglican priest Charles Hunt as well as Irish Anglican nun Mother Mary Clare, who had contributed articles on botany to the society's journal, were among the many foreign missionaries and diplomats taken northward on the so-called Death March by the North Korean forces. Hunt died during the journey in November 1950.

=== Modern period ===
It was several years after the end of the Korean War before returning members were able to resume the Society's interrupted activities. Volume XXXII of Transactions dated 1951 and containing reports of activities in early 1950 was printed in Hong Kong in 1951, during the war. Volume XXXIII was dated 1957 and although it still had to be printed in Hong Kong, it records how the first General Meeting of the revived RASKB was held on February 23, 1956. The revived Society quickly grew and flourished.

There were increasing numbers of foreigners living in South Korea, not only diplomats and missionaries but also military, educational and business personnel. For volunteers in the US Peace Corps program, the meetings were especially important and many retained contact with the RASKB in the following decades. For a long period, the meetings of the RASKB provided a unique chance to learn more about Korean history and culture.

Very soon, the Society began to organize field trips to places of interest, sometimes far removed from Seoul. The difficulties of transportation in post-war Korea were relieved by help from the ministries and military authorities of the Republic of Korea. For a considerable period, the RASKB was alone in providing such programs and the lists of members found at the end of most volumes of Transactions soon rose to over a thousand.

It was at this time, too, that the Society began to publish scholarly and also more popular books about Korea in its own name. In the last decades of the century, it also imported and sold books about Korean topics that had been published abroad. From the late 1970s, it was able to rent an office / bookstore and hire a full-time Korean General Manager. Leading figures in this period include the scholarly Anglican missionary Richard Rutt, Carl Ferris Miller and the third generation of the Underwood family to belong to the RASKB, Horace G. Underwood II.

== Current status ==
Today, when South Korea is a major figure on the international stage, with hundreds of thousands of foreign residents, the RASKB continues to offer a regular program of lectures, usually twice each month held at the Somerset Palace in downtown Seoul, and excursions and walking tours on weekends.

It has published 92 volumes of Transactions as of June 2018. It maintains a modest library of some 3,000 volumes at the RASKB office in the Christian Building on Daehangno. It also has a monthly reading club focusing on translated Korean literature. Since 2004, the RASKB has been registered with the government of South Korea as a non-profit cultural foundation.

The RASKB continues to celebrate its anniversary every June with a garden party, held either at the UK Embassy or the US ambassador's residence in Jeong-dong.

== Presidents of the RAS-KB ==
- 1900: John Harington Gubbins
- 1902-03: John Newell Jordan
- 1903-11: No Presidents elected
- 1911: Arthur Hyde-Lay
- 1912-16: James Scarth Gale
- 1916: Arthur Hyde-Lay
- 1917-19: Bishop Mark Napier Trollope
- 1920: Ransford Stevens Miller
- 1921-25: Bishop Mark Napier Trollope
- 1926: Henry Dodge Appenzeller
- 1928-30: Bishop Mark Napier Trollope
- 1931-33: Dr. Horace Horton Underwood
- 1934: E.W. Koons
- 1935: Charles Hunt
- 1936: Hugh Miller
- 1937: W. M. Clark
- 1938-41: Dr. Horace Horton Underwood
- 1948-49: Dr. Horace Horton Underwood
- 1950: Charles Hunt
- 1957: Horace Grant Underwood II
- 1958: George L. Paik
- 1959: Dr. Richard Hertz
- 1960: Dr. Richard Hertz
- 1961-65: Roger Chambard
- 1966: Robert A. Kinney
- 1967: David Steinberg
- 1968: Samuel H. Moffett
- 1969: Carl F. Bartz
- 1971: Nigel C.C. Trench
- 1972: Prof. Kim, Jungsae
- 1973: Amb. Pierre Landy
- 1974: Bishop Richard Rutt
- 1975: Edward R. Wright
- 1976: Prof. Song, Yo-in
- 1977: Dr. Karl Leuteritz
- 1978: James Wade
- 1979: Ms. Helen R. Tieszen
- 1980: Paul G. van Weddingen
- 1981: Amb. Roland van den Berg
- 1982: Dr. James Hoyt
- 1983: Mrs. Barbara Mintz
- 1984: Dr. James Edward Hoare
- 1985: Duane C. Davidson
- 1986: Phillip Wetton
- 1987: Carl Ferris Miller
- 1988-89: Dr. Kim, Young-duk
- 1989-91: Frederick Carriere
- 1992-93: Dr. Horace G. Underwood
- 1994: Samuel H. Kidder
- 1995-96: Dr. Suh, Ji-moon
- 1997: John Nowell
- 1998-99: Amb. Joost Wolfswinkel
- 2000-01: Dr. Horace G. Underwood
- 2002-05: Dr. Kim, Young-duk
- 2006-07: Jang, Song-Hyon
- 2008-10: Peter Bartholomew
- 2011-20: Brother Anthony of Taizé
- 2021-2024: Steven L. Shields
- 2025-present: Denny Park
