= De Paula =

de Paula is a surname.

== List of people with the surname ==
- André de Paula (born 1961), Brazilian politician
- Bruna de Paula (born 1996), Brazilian handball player
- Darly de Paula (born 1982), Brazilian-born Spanish handball goalkeeper
- Emanuela de Paula (born 1989), Brazilian model
- Francisco de Paula del Villar y Lozano (1828–1901), Spanish architect
- Francisco de Paula Santander (1792–1840), Colombian military and political leader
- Giuliano de Paula (born 1990), Brazilian professional footballer
- Gloria de Paula (born 1995), Brazilian mixed martial artist
- Guilherme de Paula (born 1986), Brazilian professional footballer
- Lucas Gonçalves de Paula (born 1999), Brazilian professional footballer
- José de Paula (born 1990), Dominican professional baseball pitcher
- Óscar de Paula (born 1975), Spanish retired footballer
- Patrick de Paula (born 1999), Brazilian professional footballer
- Tjoe de Paula (born 1982), Dutch-Dominican retired basketball player
- Tilde de Paula Eby (born 1972), Chilean-born Swedish journalist, author and television presenter

== See also ==
- De Paul (surname)
- Francisco de Paula (disambiguation)
