= Society of the Holy Cross (Korea) =

Order in the Anglican Church of Korea

The Society of the Holy Cross (SHC) is an order of women religious (or nuns) in the Anglican Church of Korea. It is not to be confused with the Society of the Holy Cross, SSC (Societas Sanctae Crucis), which is an international order of Anglo-Catholic priests within the Anglican tradition.

== History ==
From 1892 onwards, sisters from the Community of St Peter in Woking were sent to work in Korea. In 1925 Mark Trollope, the Anglican bishop in Seoul, founded SHC as a local religious order, but support from the Community of St Peter continued until 1950. Today around 20 sisters live at the mother house in Jung-gu, Seoul.

== Martyrdom of Mother Mary Clare ==
Sister Mary Clare CSP came from Woking to assume office as the first Reverend Mother (superior) of the new Society of the Holy Cross. She was an active campaigner for the Korean people, and was persecuted by North Korean communist authorities.

During the Korean War, Mother Mary Clare refused the opportunity from the British embassy to evacuate from Seoul, opting to stay with her congregation. Following her capture by retreating North Korean forces, she died on 6 November 1950 near Chunggangjin (present day North Korea) during a death march which had begun on 30 October. Mother Mary Clare's example has since formed a major influence upon the community.

== International operation ==
The SHC sisters have felt called in recent years to expand their work into other countries. Initially they opened a branch house convent in England, but this closed again in November 2010 as a result of the administrative difficulties experienced in obtaining visas for the sisters to come to the United Kingdom. Instead the community is now working with postulants from Myanmar, Singapore, and Hong Kong, with a view to possibly expanding into these countries in the near future.
