= De Paul =

Depaul, de Paul or DePaul may refer to:

- De Paul (surname)
- DePaul University, in Chicago, Illinois, United States
- DePaul College Prep, in Chicago, Illinois, United States
- DePaul Catholic High School, Wayne, New Jersey, United States
