= Edward Stopford (bishop) =

Irish Anglican bishop

Edward Stopford PC (died 1850) was an Anglican bishop in the Church of Ireland in the 19th century. A former Archdeacon of Armagh, he became Bishop of Meath in 1842 and died in post on 17 September 1850.

His son Edward Adderly Stopford was also a Church of Ireland cleric, and served as Rector of Kells, and Archdeacon of Meath appointed by his father. Stopford's granddaughter was the writer, historian, and nominee to the Irish Free State Senate Alice Stopford Green (1847–1929). He was also the great-grandfather of the Anglican nun and botanist Mother Mary Clare, who died during a death march during the Korean War.

Anglican Communion titles
Preceded by Charles Dickenson	Bishop of Meath; 1842–1850	Succeeded by Thomas Townsend
