= José María Bocabella =

Spanish philanthropist

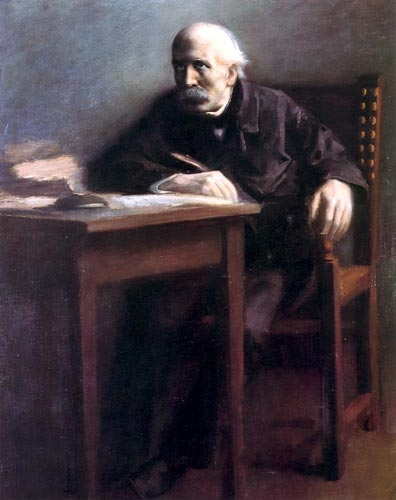
- Born: September 5, 1815; Barcelona, Spain
- Died: April 22, 1892 (aged 76); Barcelona, Spain
- Occupations: Bookseller, philanthropist
- Known for: Founder of the Association of Devotees of Saint Joseph and promoter of the construction of the Sagrada Família

José María Bocabella y Verdaguer (Note: Some works refer to him using the standardized Catalan form of his name: Josep Maria Bocabella i Verdaguer) (5 September 1815 – 22 April 1892) was a Spanish bookseller and philanthropist, best known for initiating the construction of the Basílica i Temple Expiatori de la Sagrada Família in Barcelona.

== Biography ==
Bocabella was born in 1815 at 2 Cotoners Street in Barcelona, the son of Llorens Bocabella i Bunyol and Francisca Verdaguer i Bollich.

He owned the religious publishing house and bookstore Herederos de la Viuda Pla. In 1861, after a trip to Rome, he developed a strong devotion to Saint Joseph, which led him to promote Christian family values. To this end, he founded the Association of Devotees of Saint Joseph (1866), which reportedly had up to 600,000 members. He also launched the magazine El propagador de la devoción a San José in 1866, modeled after the French periodical Propagateur de la dévotion a Saint Joseph published by Joseph Huguet in Sainte-Foy near Dijon. The initial circulation reached 25,000 copies. The publication continues to this day under the name Temple. He also established workshops for workers and apprentices.

Bocabella conceived the idea of building a Catholic temple dedicated to the Holy Family. He purchased a plot of land in the Eixample, in an area then known as El Poblet, near Camp de l'Arpa, in the former municipality of Sant Martí de Provençals. The land cost 172,000 pesetas (equivalent to around €10,000 today). The original design was commissioned from architect Francisco de Paula del Villar y Lozano, who proposed a Neo-Gothic structure, rejecting Bocabella’s idea of replicating the Basilica della Santa Casa. In 1883, Villar resigned due to disagreements with Joan Martorell, Bocabella's architectural adviser. The commission was then offered to Martorell, who declined and suggested Antoni Gaudí, who would go on to devote his life to the project.

Bocabella was married to Teresa Puig i Xicola, with whom he had a daughter, Francisca de Paula Bocabella y Puig. She continued his work with the publishing house and the Construction Board of the Expiatory Temple of the Sagrada Família. He died in 1892 and was buried in the Chapel of the Holy Christ in the Crypt of the Sagrada Família.

== Bibliography ==
- Bassegoda, Joan (2002). Gaudí o espacio, luz y equilibrio. Madrid: Criterio. ISBN 84-95437-10-4.
- Casanelles, Eusebi (1965). Nueva visión de Gaudí. Polígrafa.
- Flores, Carlos (2002). La lección de Gaudí. Espasa-Calpe.
- Langmead, Donald; Garnaut, Christine (2001). Encyclopedia of Architectural and Engineering Feats. ABC-CLIO.
- Ritthausen, Marianne (1992). Barcelona, Tradition und Moderne. Studien zur künstlerischen Inszenierung einer Metropole. Jonas Verlag.
