= John Cantwell =

John Cantwell may refer to:

- John C. Cantwell (1859–1940), American Coast Guard officer and explorer of Alaska
- John Joseph Cantwell (1874–1947), first archbishop of the Roman Catholic Archdiocese of Los Angeles
- John Cantwell (bishop of Meath) (1792–1866), Roman Catholic Bishop of Meath
- John Cantwell (general) (born 1956), Australian Army officer
- John Cantwell (journalist), Australian journalist killed during the Vietnam War
- Jonathan Cantwell, Australian cyclist
- John Cantwell, American actor performing under the name Love Connie
