= Mark Trollope =

Mark Napier Trollope (20 March 1862 – 1930) was the third Anglican Bishop in Korea from 1911 until his death.

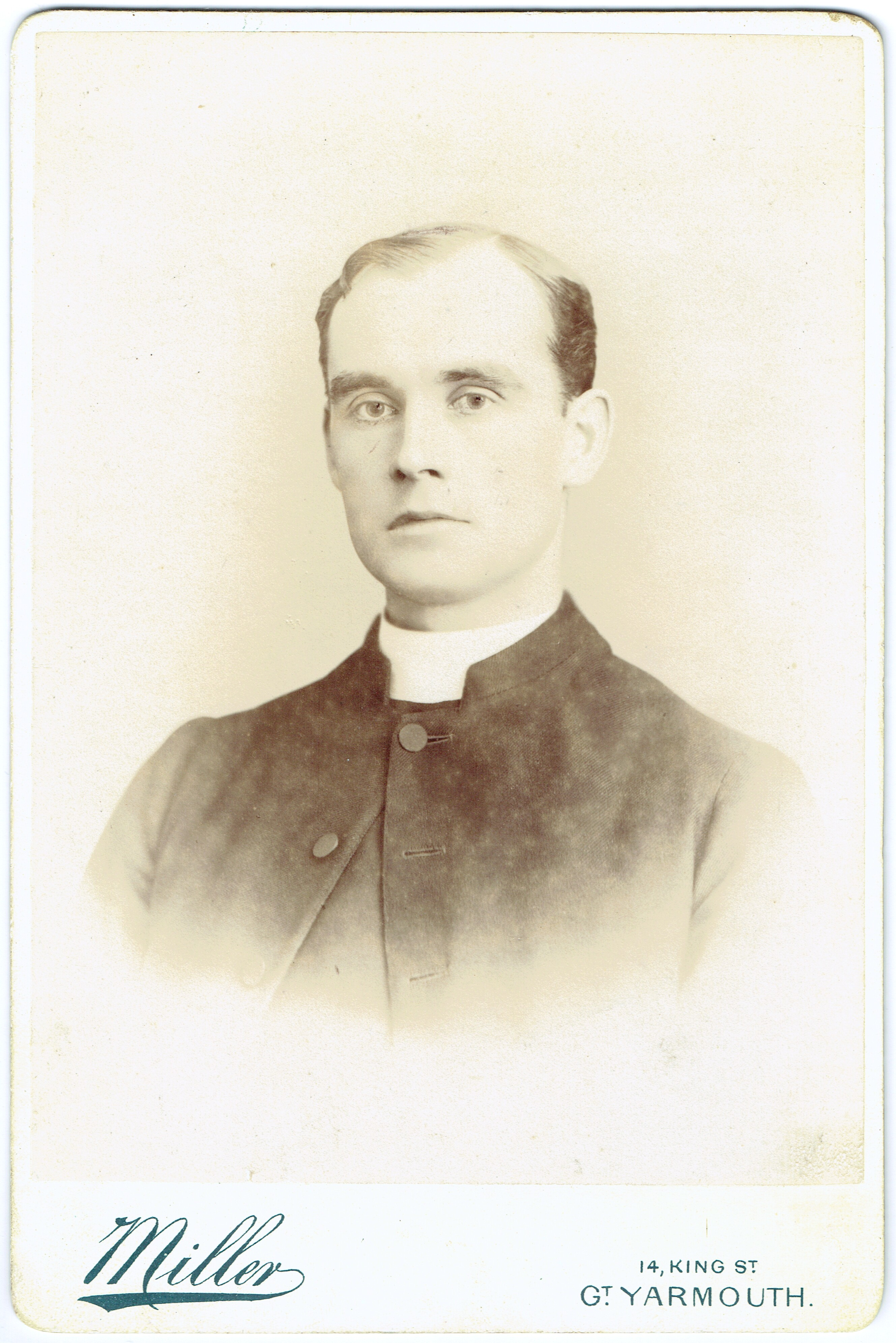
The Revd Mark Napier Trollope, 1890

Trollope was born on 28 March 1862, the second son of Charles Brown Trollope, a surveyor and architect, and Elizabeth Napier. He was a third cousin, twice removed, of the novelist, Anthony Trollope. Educated at Lancing College and New College, Oxford, he was ordained in 1888. After a curacy at Great Yarmouth from 1887 to 1890, he spent a decade with the missionary team in Korea. After returning to England he was successively Vicar of St Saviour's, Poplar, and St Alban the Martyr, Birmingham. After some debate he was appointed to the post of Bishop in Korea, to which many others felt he was suited. He was consecrated bishop on St James's Day (25 July), by Randall Davidson, Archbishop of Canterbury, at St Paul's Cathedral.

He served as President of the Royal Asiatic Society Korea Branch for 13 years. A keen chronicler of the emerging church, he died of a heart attack on 6 November 1930, brought about by shock when the ship on which he was returning from Europe after attending the Lambeth Conference collided with another vessel while entering harbour in Japan.

Along with Mother Mary Clare as Mother Superior, Trollope helped found the Society of the Holy Cross order of nuns in Seoul in 1925.

== Archives ==
A collection of archival material related to Mark Napier Trollope can be found at the Cadbury Research Library, University of Birmingham.

== Notes ==
Religious titles
Preceded by Arthur Beresford Turner	Bishop in Korea; 1911–1930	Succeeded by Alfred Cecil Cooper
