= Thomas Townsend (bishop) =

Anglican Bishop of Meath

Thomas Stewart Townsend (1800–1852) was an Irish Anglican bishop in the Church of Ireland in the 19th century.

He was successively Dean of Lismore and Dean of Waterford to 1850. He became Bishop of Meath in 1850 and died in post in Málaga on 16 September 1852. His Times obituary noted that "by his death the system of national education has lost an earnest advocate".

Religious titles
Preceded by Edward Adderly Stopford	Bishop of Meath; 1850 – 1852	Succeeded by Joseph Henderson Singer
