= William Walsh (bishop of Meath) =

Irish prelate

William Walsh OCist (c. 1512 – 4 January 1577) was an Irish Roman Catholic prelate and Bishop of Meath, Ireland, recognised by both the Crown and the Vatican from 1554 to 1560 and recognised by the Vatican from 1554 to 1577. After he ceased to be recognized by the Crown, he was in Ireland for a brief period from April 1575.

== Biography ==
William Walsh was born at Dunboyne early in the 16th century, and was appointed, by the Pope, Bishop of Meath in 1554. He enjoyed more than one office under Elizabeth, but refusing in 1560 to conform in matters of religion, was first imprisoned and afterwards deprived of his bishopric. He was subsequently set free, but was again cast into prison in 1565. On 16 July, Adam Loftus, the Archbishop of Armagh, wrote to Cecil:

"He refused the oath, ... and openly showed himself to be a misliker of all the Queen's Majesty's proceedings. He openly protested before all the people, the same day he was before us, that he would never communicate or be present, by his will, where the service should be ministered, for it was against his conscience, and, as he thought, against God's Word. ... It were fit he should be sent to England, and peradventure by conferring with the learned bishops there he might be brought to some conformity. He is one of great credit amongst his countrymen, and upon whom, as touching causes of religion, they wholly depend."

After enduring seven years' imprisonment, he escaped to France about 1572. He appears to have returned to Ireland and resumed his episcopal functions in 1575, as in April of that year he had a brief from Rome empowering him to act for the dioceses of Armagh and Dublin, as well as Meath. Bishop Walsh subsequently retired to Spain, where he held the position of suffragan to the Archbishop of Toledo. He died at Alcalá, 4 January 1577.
