= Augustine Cheevers =

Irish Roman Catholic clergyman (1686–1778)

Augustine Cheevers O.S.A.
- Bishop of Meath
- Church: Catholic Church
- Diocese: Diocese of Meath
- In office: 7 August 1756 – 18 August 1778
- Predecessor: Stephen MacEgan
- Successor: Patrick Joseph Plunkett
- Previous post: Bishop of Ardagh and Clonmacnoise (1751-1756)

Personal details
- Born: 1686 Killian (northeast of present-day Mountbellew), County Galway, Kingdom of Ireland, English Empire
- Died: 18 August 1778 (aged 91–92) Randalstown, County Antrim, Kingdom of Ireland, British Empire

Augustine Cheevers (1686 – 1778) was an Irish Roman Catholic clergyman A member of the Order of Saint Augustine (OSA).

Cheevers was born in Killian, County Galway in 1686, one of the six sons of John Chevers and Ellis Geoghegan. Dr. Cheevers was Bishop of Ardagh from 1751 to 1756 and Bishop of Meath from then until his death in Randelstown, aged 92 on 18 August 1778. He is buried in Oristown, County Meath, in Donaghpatrick Cemetery. His uncle Edward Chevers, was made Viscount Mount Leinster by King James II for whom he was Aide-de-Camp at the battle of the boyne, and it is with Viscount Mount Leinster, that Augustine is supposed to have aged 14 gone to France, where he was educated in Paris.

Due to persecution of the Catholic Church and under the penal laws unable to train priests in Ireland, he founded Burses for students from the diocese, in the College of Douai, France.

Catholic Church titles
| Preceded by Thomas MacDermot Roe | Bishop of Ardagh; 1751–1756 | Succeeded by Anthony Blake (bishop); As Bishop of Ardagh and Clonmacnoise |
| Preceded by Stephen MacEgan | Bishop of Meath; 1751–1756 | Succeeded by Patrick Joseph Plunkett |
