= Francisco de Paula =

Francisco de Paula may refer to:

- Infante Francisco de Paula of Spain (1794–1865), infant of Spain
- Francisco de Paula Aguirre (1875–1939), Venezuelan composer
- Francisco De Paula Bazán (born 1980), Peruvian goalkeeper
- Francisco de Paula Gelabert, colonial governor of Florida in 1796
- Don Francisco de Paula Marín (1774–1837), Spanish advisor to Kingdom of Hawaii
- Francisco de Paula Martínez de la Rosa, Prime Minister of Spain
- Francisco de Paula Rodrigues Alves (1848–1919), president of Brazil
- Francisco de Paula Santander (1792–1840), military and politician leader of Colombia
- José Francisco de Paula Señan (1760–1823), Spanish missionary to the Americas
- Francisco de Paula del Villar y Lozano (1828–1901), Spanish architect
- Francisco de Paula Vieira da Silva de Tovar, 1st Viscount of Molelos (1774–1848), Portuguese military officer and politician
- Saint Francis of Paola, also known as Francisco de Paula
- Francisco de Paula (actor) (1913–1985), was an Argentine actor

== Places ==
- Francisco de Paula Santander University, University of Brazil
- São Francisco de Paula, Rio Grande do Sul, city of Brazil
- São Francisco de Paula, Minas Gerais, municipality of Brazil
