= De Paul (surname) =

Depaul, de Paul or DePaul may refer to:

- Andy DePaul (1928–2014), American amateur and professional boxer and referee
- Bobby DePaul (born 1963), American football coach
- Fernando de Paul (born 1991), Argentine footballer
- Gene de Paul (1919–1988), American pianist, composer and songwriter
- Katherine DePaul (born 1972), American artist manager
- Lyndsay DePaul (born 1988), American swimmer
- Lynsey de Paul (1950–2014), English singer-songwriter
- Rodrigo De Paul (born 1994), Argentine footballer
- Steven DePaul, American television director and producer
- Tony DePaul, American comic writer
- Vincent de Paul (1581–1660), Catholic priest and saint
- Vincent De Paul (actor) (born 1960), American actor and model
- William de Paul, 14th century English Carmelite and bishop of Meath in Ireland

== See also ==
- De Paula
