= Edward Stopford (archdeacon of Meath) =

Irish Anglican priest

Edward Adderley Stopford (1810–1874) was an Irish Anglican priest.

The son of Edward Stopford, Bishop of Meath from 1842 to 1850, he was educated at Trinity College, Dublin. He held incumbencies at Caledon and Kells. He was Archdeacon of Meath from 1844; and Vicar general of Meath from 1848: holding both offices until his death.

His wife Anne died on 13 June 1891. Their daughter Alice Stopford Green was an Irish historian.
