= Cecil Cooper (bishop) =

Anglican Bishop in Korea

Alfred Cecil Cooper was the fourth Anglican Bishop in Korea from 1931 until 1954. Born in 1882 and educated at Bradfield College and Christ's College, Cambridge, he was ordained priest on Trinity Sunday (26 May), by Handley Moule, Bishop of Durham, at Durham Cathedral. After a curacy at St Oswald's, West Hartlepool he spent the rest of his active ministry in Korea. He was consecrated a bishop on St Barnabas' Day 1931 (11 June), by Cosmo Lang, Archbishop of Canterbury, at St Paul's Cathedral. "Bishop in Corea" during a turbulent period in the country's history, the most dramatic event of his episcopate was the forced march to the very top of the country during the Korean War. During his capture, 1951–1953, his assistant bishop, Arthur Chadwell, was acting bishop diocesan. Retiring in 1954, he died a decade later on 17 December 1964.

== Archives ==
A collection of archival material related to Alfred Cecil Cooper can be found at the Cadbury Research Library, University of Birmingham.

Religious titles
Preceded by Mark Trollope	Bishop in Korea; 1931–1954	Succeeded by John Daly
