= Alice Stopford Green =

Irish nationalist and author (1847–1929)

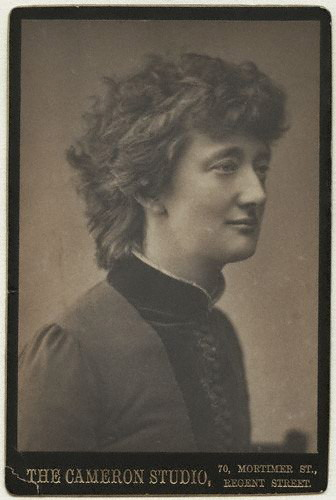
- Stopford Green, c. 1880s

Senator
- In office 11 December 1922 – 28 May 1929

Personal details
- Born: Alice Sophia Amelia Stopford; 30 May 1847 Kells, County Meath, Ireland
- Died: 28 May 1929 (aged 81) Dublin, Ireland
- Party: Independent
- Spouse: John Richard Green (m. 1877; died 1883)
- Parent: Edward Adderley Stopford (father)
- Relatives: Edward Stopford (grandfather); Stopford Brooke (cousin)
- Profession: Historian; author
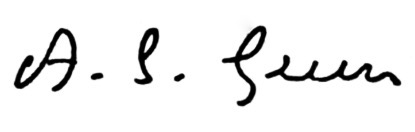
- Signature

Alice Sophia Amelia Stopford Green (née Stopford; 30 May 1847 – 28 May 1929) was an Irish historian, nationalist and author. A supporter of the Anglo-Irish Treaty and the establishment of the Irish Free State, Stopford become a member of the first Seanad Éireann in 1922.

== Early life and education ==
Green was born Alice Sophia Amelia Stopford on 31 May 1847 in Kells, County Meath to The Rev Edward Adderley Stopford, the Archdeacon of Meath and expert in canon law, and Anne Catherine Stopford (née Duke). One of nine siblings, Stopford was the paternal granddaughter of Edward Stopford, the Bishop of Meath, and the cousin of Stopford Brooke, a clergyman, royal chaplain and writer.

Apart from one year at spent at a school, Stopford was educated alongside her three sisters at home by a governess. Stopford developed an eye condition at the age of sixteen, which led to a severe visual impairment. No longer able to read, Stopford had an operation in 1871 which greatly improved her sight. Whilst Stopford was recovering the family moved to Dublin. Alongside a female companion, Stopford began attending physic lectures at the Royal College of Science for Ireland.

From 1874 to 1877, Alice Stopford lived in London where she met the historian John Richard Green. They were married in Chester on 14 June 1877. He died suddenly in 1883 and left his widow a substantial income and a network of important contacts who helped her launch her own career as an historian and author. One of those contacts, John Morley, commissioned her first solely written historical work, Henry the Second, published in 1888.

== Political engagement ==
In the 1890s, Stopford Green became interested in Irish history and the nationalist movement as a result of her friendship with John Francis Taylor. She was vocal in opposing English colonial policy in South Africa during the Boer Wars, and in supporting Roger Casement's Congo Reform movement. She was an early practitioner and advocate of women's historiography, which she discussed in her 1897 pamphlet, Woman's Place in the World of Letters. In 1908, Stopford Green argued for the sophistication and richness of the native Irish civilisation in her book, The Making of Ireland and Its Undoing, 1200–1600. It has been called "the first study of its kind to employ rigorous research and referencing"; it proposed that "a version of primitive communism had existed before the Norman invasion of the 12th century."

She was active in efforts to make the prospect of Home Rule more palatable to Ulster Unionists. Alongside the Rev. James Armour, Roger Casement, and Jack White, she addressed "A Protestant Protest" against Carson's Solemn League and Covenant at Ballymoney Town Hall in October 1913. She was closely involved in the Howth gun-running of July 1914, having extended Casement a loan to help buy the German arms.

After Stopford Green moved to 90 St Stephen's Green in Dublin in 1918, her house became an intellectual centre. In 1919 she hired the Irish Republican and Cumann na mBan leader Maire Comerford as her secretary and researcher for her writings. She supported the pro-Treaty side in the Irish Civil War and was among the first nominees to the newly formed Seanad Éireann in 1922, where she served as an independent member till her death in 1929. She was one of only four women elected or appointed to the first Seanad.

== Works ==
- A Short Geography of the British Islands (1879). Co-authored with John Richard Green.
- Henry the Second (1888). She was listed as Mrs. J. R. Green.
- A Short History of the English People (1892). Co-edited with Kate Norgate.
- Town Life in the Fifteenth Century Vol. I (1894).
- Town Life in the Fifteenth Century Vol. II (1894).
- Woman's Place in the World of Letters (1897).
- Oxford Studies (1901). Co-edited with Kate Norgate.
- The Making of Ireland and Its Undoing, 1200–1600 (1908).
- Irish Nationality (1911).
- The Old Irish World (1912).
- Loyalty and Disloyalty: What It Means in Ireland (1918).
- Ourselves Alone in Ulster (1918).
- History of the Irish State to 1014 (1925). Her last major work.
