= Patrick Joseph Plunkett =

Irish Roman Catholic priest

His Excellency, The Most Reverend Patrick Joseph Plunkett

Personal details
- Born: 1738
- Died: 1827 (aged 88–89)

Patrick Joseph Plunkett (1738-1827) was an Irish Catholic priest who served as Bishop of Meath from 1778 until 1827.

He was born in Kells, Co. Meath on Christmas Eve 1738 the son of Thomas Plunkett and Mary (née Murphy). He studied for the priesthood in France and was ordained in 1764 in Collège de Trente-trois. Remaining in Paris following ordination he gained a doctorate in theology at the Sorbonne University in 1770. Dr. Plunkett served as joint Superior of the Irish College in Paris (College of the Lombards) and royal professor of theology at the Collège de Navarre, before being ordained Bishop of Meath in 1778 and consecrated in Meath in 1779.

He founded the diocesan seminary St Finians College, Navan opened in 1802, for the preparation of candidates to study in Maynooth College for the priesthood, he was active in the founding of Maynooth College. Dr. Plunkett preached against the United Irishmen rebellion of 1798. He died in office on 11 January 1827, and was succeeded by Bishop Robert Logan.

Catholic Church titles
| Preceded by Augustine Cheevers | Bishop of Meath; 1778–1827 | Succeeded by Robert Logan |
