= Carl Ferris Miller =

South Korean banker and arborist (1921–2002)

Dr Carl Ferris Miller
- Born: April 5, 1921; Pittston, Pennsylvania, United States
- Died: April 8, 2002 (aged 81)

Korean name
- Hangul: 민병갈
- Hanja: 閔丙葛
- RR: Min Byeonggal
- MR: Min Pyŏnggal

Carl Ferris Miller (1921–2002), also known by the Korean name Min Byung-gal (Korean: 민병갈), was an American-born South Korean banker and arborist. Dr CF Miller is the best known as the founder of the Chollipo Arboretum Foundation in Taean County, South Chungcheong Province, South Korea, and one of the first Americans to be naturalized as a South Korean citizen.

== Early life ==
Miller, a native of Pittston, Pennsylvania, was a Phi Beta Kappa chemistry major in college. With the outbreak of World War II, he studied Japanese at the US Navy Japanese/Oriental Language School at the University of Colorado Boulder. He went on to serve as a Naval Intelligence Officer. In 1945 he was assigned to seek out Japanese soldiers still on the island of Okinawa, questioning village residents during the day. At night, these soldiers would return to obtain food and other support from the villagers.

According to William C. Sherman, in 1949 Miller was his deputy at the Performance Review Section of the Economic Cooperation Administration in Seoul. When the Korean War broke out in 1950, he was evacuated to Japan, returning in 1951. In 1953 Miller worked for South Korea's central bank, the Bank of Korea, until his retirement in the early 1980s. He became fluent in the Korean language and later worked as a financial advisor and broker with a number of South Korean financial firms, ending with Good Morning Securities.

Miller eventually took the Korean name Min Byung-gal and in 1979 became a naturalized South Korean citizen.

He was a skilled bridge player and traveled the world with the South Korean national team. He gave time and money to a number of charitable causes and extended personal assistance to many Koreans, including the continuing support of over 50 children.

== Chollipo Arboretum ==
During a 1962 swimming trip, a weekend getaway from Seoul, Miller was persuaded by a cash-poor, land-rich villager into buying a barren plot of land near the fishing village of Chollipo in Taean County. It sat idle until 1970, when, disgusted by Seoul's worsening air pollution, Mr. Miller moved his traditional Korean house from its Seoul location to his seaside retreat.

When Miller settled at his new seaside retreat, he decided it needed some trees. He planted a few and then a few more. More villagers approached him to buy their land, so he did—and then he planted more trees. He later said he had had no idea he would create an arboretum recognized by international horticultural societies, no idea that he would give up his nationality and no idea he would be awarded the highest honor the South Korean government can bestow on a civilian. He just wanted to plant a few trees.

Today the arboretum boasts a collection of millions of examples of the more than 13,200 species of trees and plants that Mr. Miller spent 40 years collecting, growing and cultivating. In addition, the arboretum grounds are home to traditional tile-roofed wooden houses called hanok that he moved there and renovated.

== Awards ==
Miller and his arboretum have received many awards including recognition by the United Kingdom's Royal Horticultural Society, the U.S. Freedom Foundation and the South Korean government. In 2002 he was awarded the Gold Tower Order of Industrial Service Merit by then-President Kim Dae-jung. In 2005, Miller posthumously became the fifth person awarded the Forest Hall of Fame Award for the contribution of the Chollipo Arboretum to South Korea's forestry sector. The International Dendrology Society picked the Chollipo Arboretum as the world's 12th site to be given an Arboretum Distinguished for Merit (the first to be so recognized in Asia) and the Holly Society of America named it the Official Holly Arboretum.
