= Robert Logan (bishop) =

Irish Catholic bishop

His Most Reverend, Dr. Robert Logan
- Bishop of Meath
- Archdiocese: Armagh
- Diocese: Meath
- Predecessor: Patrick Joseph Plunkett
- Successor: John Cantwell

Orders
- Ordination: 27 May 1809
- Consecration: 24 August 1824 by Patrick Curtis

Personal details
- Born: 1784 Navan County Meath
- Died: 22 April 1830 (aged 45–46)
- Denomination: Roman Catholic

Styles of Robert Logan
- Reference style: The Most Reverend
- Spoken style: Your Grace
- Religious style: Bishop

Robert Logan (1784 – 22 April 1830) was the Roman Catholic Bishop of Meath, Ireland from 1827 to his death in 1830.

== Early life and ministry ==
Logan was born near Navan, County Meath in 1784, he was ordained a priest in the Diocese of Meath on 27 May 1809.

== Episcopal ministry ==
Pope Leo XII named him Coadjutor bishop of Meath and titular bishop of Tremithus on 24 August 1824, he was consecrated on 28 October of that year. On the death of his predecessor Patrick Joseph Plunkett he succeeded as ordinary of the diocese on 11 January 1827.

== Death ==
He died while in office on 22 April 1830.

Catholic Church titles
Preceded by Patrick Joseph Plunkett	Bishop of Meath; 1827 – 1830	Succeeded by John Cantwell
