= John Cantwell (bishop of Meath) =

- Bishop of Meath
- Church: Catholic Church
- Diocese: Diocese of Meath
- In office: 20 July 1830 – 11 December 1866
- Predecessor: Robert Logan
- Successor: Thomas Nulty

Orders
- Ordination: c. 1815
- Consecration: 21 September 1830 by Daniel Murray

Personal details
- Born: 25 December 1792 Rahan, County Offaly, Kingdom of Ireland, British Empire
- Died: 11 December 1866 (aged 73) Mullingar, County Westmeath, United Kingdom of Great Britain and Ireland

Bishop John Cantwell was a Roman Catholic Bishop of Meath.

John Cantwell was born in Rahan, near Tullamore, County Offaly on Christmas Day 1792, to Edward Cantwell (1750–1831) and his wife Catherine Flynn (1760–1842). He went to Maynooth College to study for the priesthood at a very early age. At Maynooth he excelled as a student, and was one of the first Dunboyne Establishment students, going on to hold the chair of Natural Philosophy at the College. He was appointed Dean of the Ecclesiastical College, before being ordained a priest ages 22 in 1815. He served as parish priest of Kilbeggan, County Westmeath, and in 1830 he was called upon to become Bishop of Meath.

Bishop Cantwell encouraged the building of schools and churches in the diocese, and the presences of religious orders.

Dr. Cantwell died at his bishops residence in Mullingar, County Westmeath, in December 1866 and is interred in Mullingar Cathedral.

Catholic Church titles
Preceded by Robert Logan	Bishop of Meath; 1830–1866	Succeeded by Thomas Nulty
