= William of St Paul =

English Carmelite and bishop of Meath in Ireland

William of St Paul, also William de Paul (died 1349) was an English Carmelite, bishop of Meath in Ireland from 1327.

== Life ==
Born in Yorkshire, William entered the Carmelite order, and studied at the University of Oxford, where he graduated D.D., and then at the University of Paris. In 1309, at a congregation of his order held at Genoa, he was elected provincial of the Carmelites in England and Scotland.

In 1327 William was provided by Pope John XXII to the see of Meath, and consecrated at Avignon, his temporalities being restored to him on 24 July. He held the see for twenty-two years, and died in July 1349.

== Works ==
By many of the early modern authors, William of St Paul is confused with William Pagham of Hanborough, or William Paull the canonist who wrote Oculus sacerdotis. Robert Walsingham quoted him, and John Bale attributed to him a work De ente rationis formaliter.

== Notes ==
Attribution

Lee, Sidney, ed. (1895). "Paul, William de" . Dictionary of National Biography. Vol. 44. London: Smith, Elder & Co.
