= Death march =

Forced relocation under the threat of death

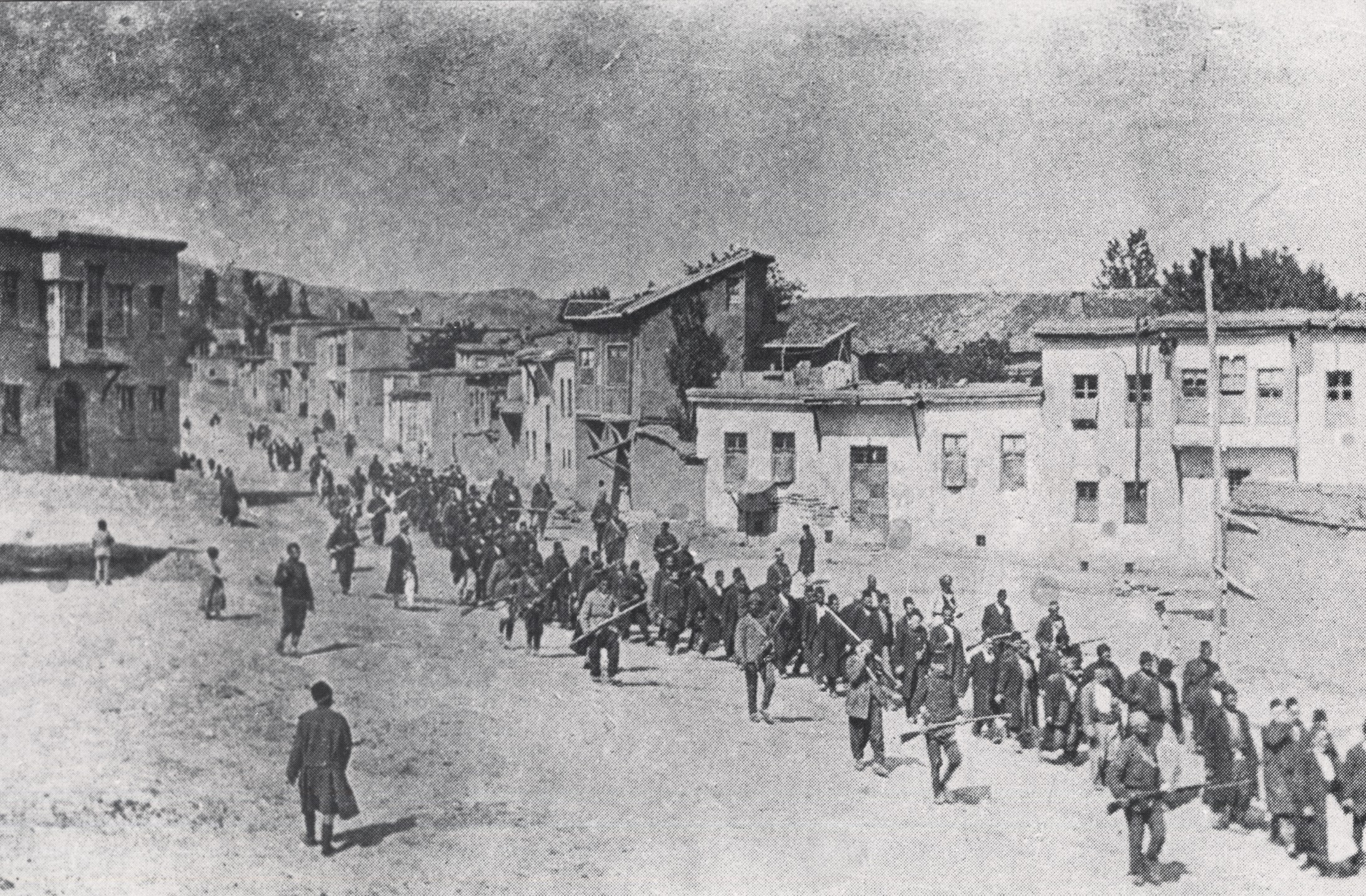
During the Armenian genocide, Armenians being led away by armed guards from Harpoot, where the educated and the influential of the city were selected to be massacred at the nearest suitable site, May 1915.

A death march is a forced march of prisoners of war, other captives, or deportees in which individuals are left to die along the way. It is distinct from simple prisoner transport via foot march. Article 19 of the Geneva Convention requires that prisoners must be moved away from a danger zone, such as an advancing front line, to a place that may be considered more secure. It is not required to evacuate prisoners who are too unwell or injured to move. In times of war, such evacuations can be difficult to carry out.

Death marches usually feature harsh physical labor and abuse, neglect of prisoner injury and illness, deliberate starvation and dehydration, humiliation, torture, and execution of those unable to keep up the marching pace. The march may end at a prisoner-of-war camp or internment camp, or it may continue until all those who are forced to march are dead.

== Notable death marches ==
=== Jingkang incident ===
In 1127, during the Jin–Song wars, the forces of the Jurchen-led Jin dynasty besieged and sacked the Imperial palaces in Bianjing (present-day Kaifeng), the capital of the Han-led Song dynasty. The Jin forces captured the Song ruler, Emperor Qinzong, along with his father, the retired Emperor Huizong, as well as many members of the imperial family and officials of the Song imperial court. According to The Accounts of Jingkang, Jin troops looted the imperial library and palace. Jin troops also abducted all the female servants and imperial musicians. The imperial family was abducted and their residences were looted. Facing the prospect of captivity and enslavement by the Jurchens, numerous palace women chose to take their own lives. The remaining captives, over 14,000 people, were forced to march alongside the seized assets towards the Jin capital. Their entourage – almost all the ministers and generals of the Northern Song dynasty – suffered from illness, dehydration, and exhaustion, and many never made it. Upon arrival, each person had to go through a ritual where the person had to be naked and wearing only sheep skins.

=== African slave trade ===
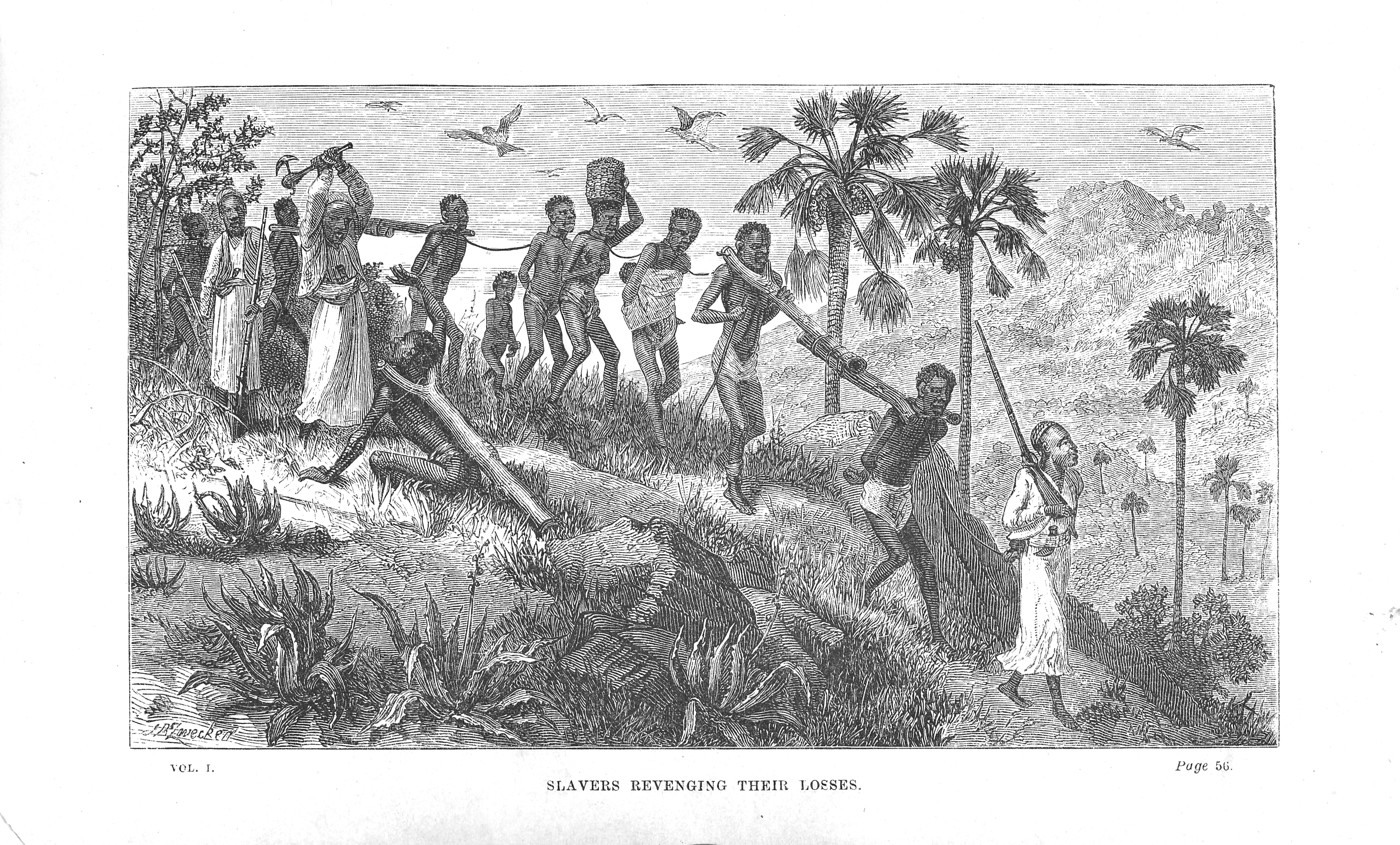
Arab-Swahili slave traders and their captives on the Ruvuma River

Forced marches were utilized against slaves who were bought or captured by slave traders in Africa. They were shipped to other lands as part of the East African slave trade with Zanzibar and the Atlantic slave trade. Sometimes, the merchants shackled the slaves and provided insufficient food. Slaves who became too weak to walk were frequently killed or left to die.

David Livingstone wrote of the East African slave trade:

We passed a slave woman shot or stabbed through the body and lying on the path. [Onlookers] said an Arab who passed early that morning had done it in anger at losing the price he had given for her, because she was unable to walk any longer.

=== Forced displacement of Native Americans ===
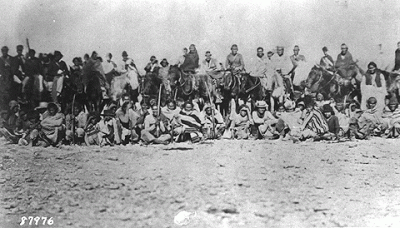
Long Walk of the Navajo

As part of Native American removal in the United States, approximately 6,000 Choctaw were forced to leave Mississippi and move to the newly forming Indian Territory (modern-day Oklahoma) in 1831. Only about 4,000 Choctaw arrived in 1832. In 1836, after the Creek War, the United States Army deported 2,500 Muskogee from Alabama in chains as prisoners of war. The rest of the tribe (12,000) followed, deported by the Army. Upon arrival to Indian Territory, 3,500 died of infection. In 1838, the Cherokee Nation was forced by order of President Andrew Jackson to march westward towards Indian Territory. This march became known as the Trail of Tears. An estimated 4,000 men, women, and children died during relocation. When the Round Valley Indian Reservation was established, the Yuki people (as they came to be called) of Round Valley were forced into a difficult and unusual situation. Their traditional homeland was not completely taken over by settlers as in other parts of California. Instead, a small part of it was reserved especially for their use as well as the use of other Indians, many of whom were enemies of the Yuki. The Yuki had to share their home with strangers who spoke other languages, lived with other beliefs, and used the land and its products differently. Indians came to Round Valley as they did to other reservations– by force. The word "drive," widely used at the time, is descriptive of the practice of "rounding up" Indians and "driving" them like cattle to the reservation where they were "corralled" by high picket fences. Such drives took place in all weathers and seasons, and the elderly and sick often did not survive. During the Long Walk of the Navajo in August 1863, all Konkow Maidu were to be sent to the Bidwell Ranch in Chico and then be taken to the Round Valley Reservation at Covelo in Mendocino County. Any Indians remaining in the area were to be shot. Maidu were rounded up and marched under guard west out of the Sacramento Valley and through to the Coastal Range. 461 Native Americans started the trek, 277 finished. They reached Round Valley on 18 September 1863. After the Yavapai Wars, 375 Yavapai perished during deportations out of 1,400 remaining Yavapai.

=== Congo Free State ===
King Leopold II sanctioned the creation of "child colonies" in his Congo Free State which had orphaned Congolese kidnapped and sent to schools operated by Catholic missionaries in which they would learn to work or be soldiers; these were the only schools funded by the state. More than 50% of the children sent to the schools died of disease, and thousands more died in the forced marches into the colonies. In one such march, 108 boys were sent over to a mission school and only 62 survived, eight of whom died a week later.

=== Dungan Revolt (1862–1877) ===
During the Dungan Revolt (1862–1877), 700,000 to 800,000 Hui Muslims from Shaanxi were deported to Gansu in China, in a process in which most were killed along the way from thirst, starvation, and massacres by the militia escorting them, with only a few thousand surviving.

=== Armenian genocide ===
The Armenian genocide resulted in the death of up to 1,500,000 people from 1915 to 1918. Under the cover of World War I, the Young Turks sought to cleanse Turkey of its Armenian population. As a result, much of the Armenian population was exiled from large parts of Western Armenia and forced to march to the Syrian desert. Many were raped, tortured, and killed on their way to the 25 concentration camps set up in the Syrian desert. There was little concern as to whether the displaced population survived at all. The most infamous camps were the Deir ez-Zor camps, where an estimated 150,000-700,000 Armenians were killed. A surviving document dated 1 December 1914 mentions a priority of "preventing an internal revolt in Van and its environs", thought to be potentially led by Armenians, which recommended arresting any Armenians suspected of potentially leading revolts and stating that such individuals "are all to be deported to Bitlis immediately in order that they be exterminated".

On 2 March 1915, Talat Pasha adopted a suggestion of Djemal Pasha to deport the Armenian population of Dörtyol, located at an important rail junction. This order was executed on 12 March 1915 without resistance; Armenian men in the town were drafted into the labor battalions. A decision for more systematic deportations was taken in late March or early April following extensive discussion within the CUP leadership. Şakir returned to Constantinople and reported that internal enemies were as much of a threat as external ones. According to the historian Akçam, there is a change from the messages sent in late 1914 and those from March and April 1915 in that the latter are written as if the overall decision to annihilate the Armenians has already been made. At this point, the telegrams openly discuss annihilation and focus on how the decision should be implemented in practice.

=== World War I ===
Grand Duke Nicolas, who was still commander-in-chief of the Western forces, after suffering serious defeats at the hands of the German army, decided to implement the decrees for the German Russians living under his army's control, principally in the Volhynia province. The lands were to be expropriated, and the owners deported to Siberia. The land was to be given to Russian war veterans once the war was over. In July 1915, without prior warning, 150,000 German settlers from Volhynia were arrested and shipped to internal exile in Siberia and Central Asia. (Some sources indicate that the number of deportees reached 200,000). Ukrainian peasants took over their lands. While precise figures remain elusive, estimates suggest that the mortality rate associated with these deportations ranged from 30% to 50%, translating to a death toll between 63,000 and 100,000 individuals.

In the eastern part of Russian Turkestan, after the suppression of the Urkun uprising against the Russian Empire tens of thousands of surviving Kyrgyz and Kazakhs fled toward China. In the Tien-Shan mountains, thousands died in mountain passes over 3,000 meters high.

=== World War II ===
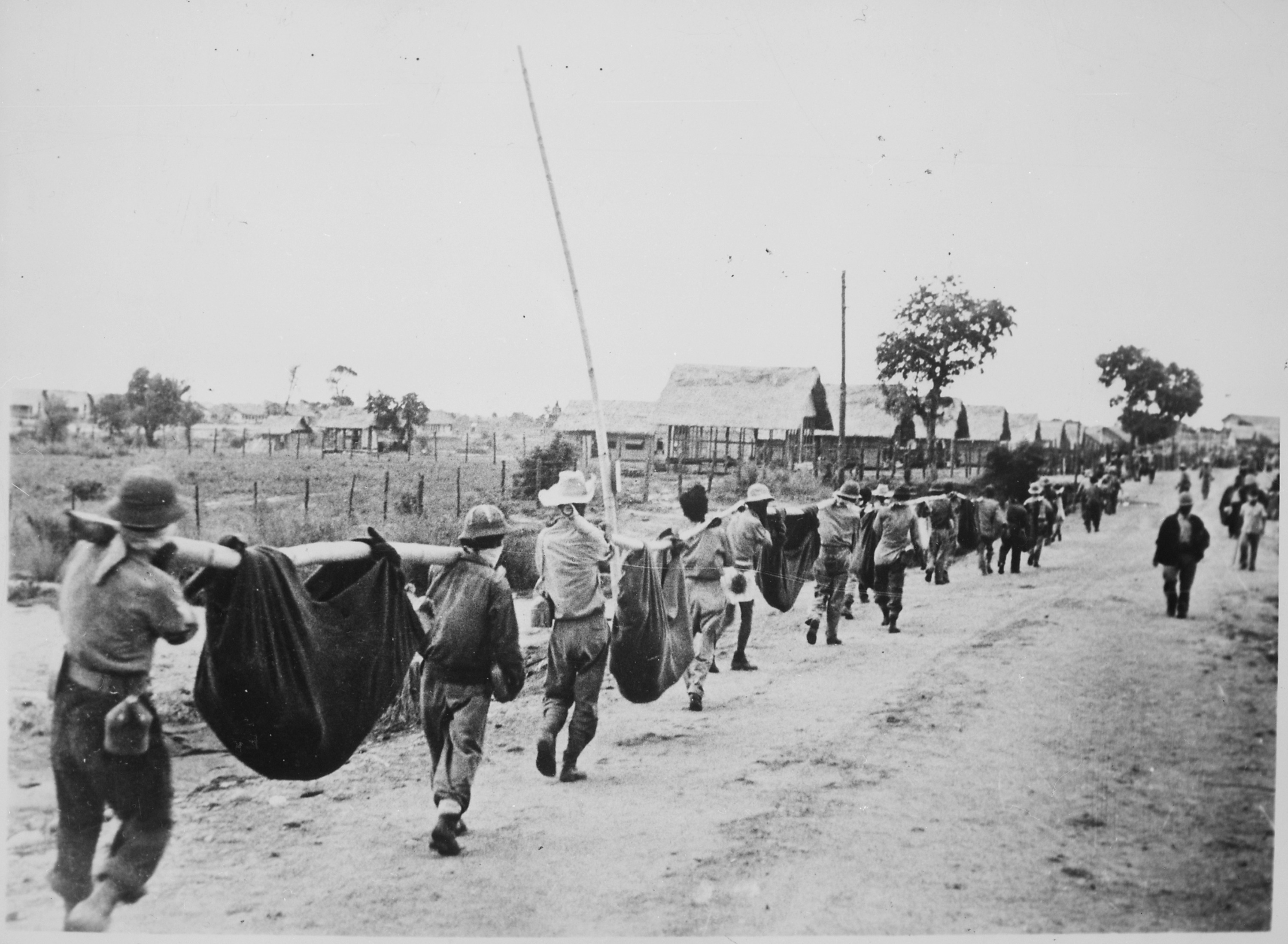
American and Filipino POWs during the Bataan Death March.

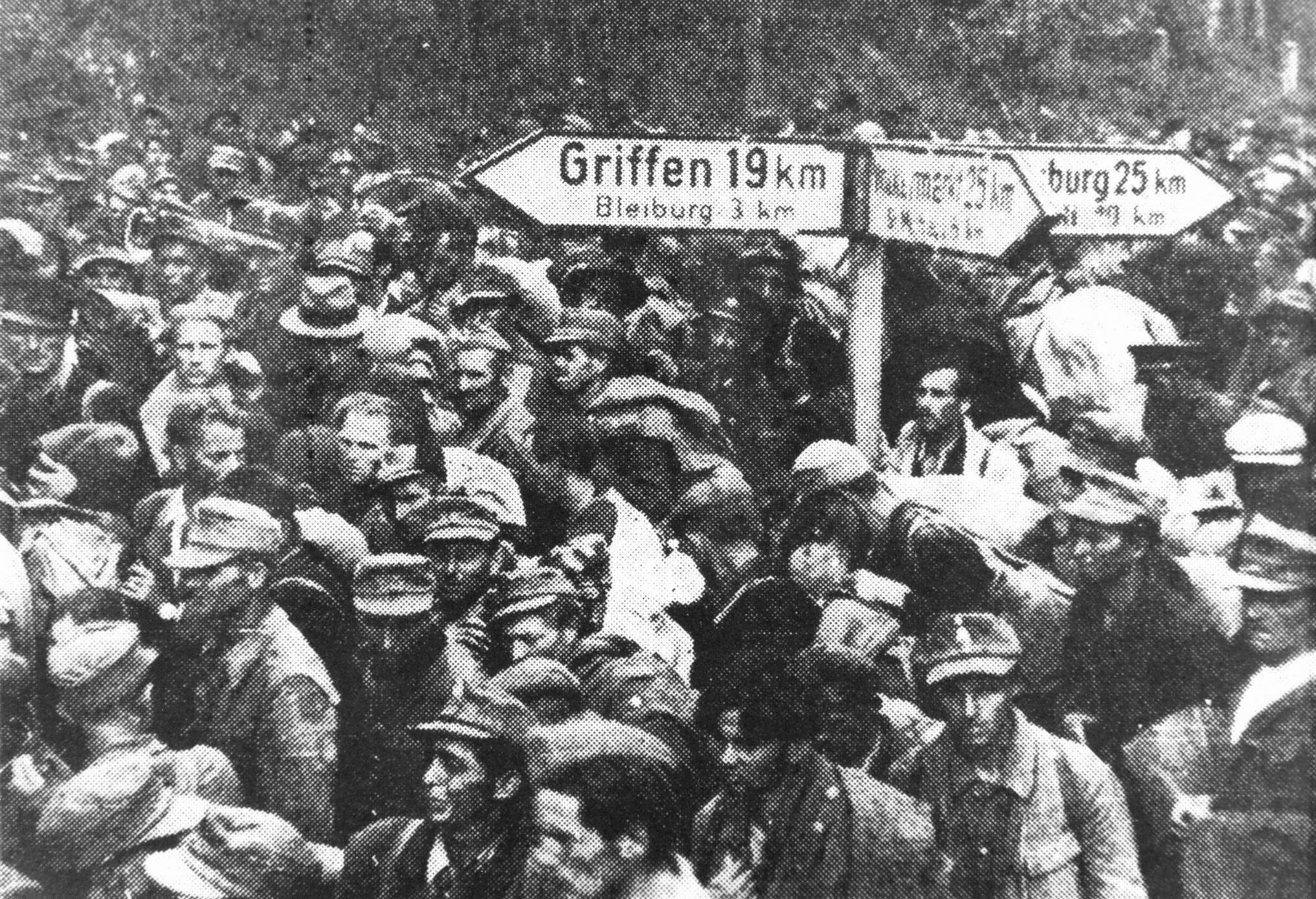
A group of Croatians during the Bleiburg repatriations.

During World War II, death marches of POWs occurred in both German-occupied Europe and the Japanese colonial empire. Death marches of those held in Nazi concentration camps were common in the later stages of the Holocaust as Allied forces closed in on the camps. One infamous death march occurred in January 1945, as the Soviet Red Army advanced on German-occupied Poland. Nine days before the Red Army arrived at the Auschwitz concentration camp, the Schutzstaffel marched nearly 60,000 prisoners out of the camp towards Wodzisław Śląski, where they were put on freight trains to other camps. Approximately 15,000 prisoners died on the way. The death marches were judged during the Nuremberg trials to be a crime against humanity. On the Eastern Front, death marches were amongst the forms of German atrocities committed against Soviet prisoners of war.

During the NKVD prisoner massacres in 1941, NKVD personnel led prisoners on death marches to various locations in Eastern Europe; upon arriving to pre-designated execution sites, the survivors were summarily executed. After the Battle of Stalingrad in February 1943, numerous German prisoners of war in the Soviet Union were subject to death marches; after enduring a period of captivity near Stalingrad, they were sent by the Soviet authorities on a "death march across the frozen steppe" to labor camps elsewhere in the Soviet Union.

The Brno death march during the expulsion of Germans from Czechoslovakia occurred in May 1945. The Bleiburg repatriations also occurred in May 1945 (during the last days of World War II and after), a total of 280,000 Croats, were involved in the Independent State of Croatia evacuation to Austria. Mostly Ustaše and the Croatian Home Guard, but also civilians and refugees, tried to flee the Yugoslav Partisans and the Red Army, and marched northwards through Bosnia and Herzegovina, Croatia and Slovenia to Allied-occupied Austria. However, the British refused to accept their surrender and directed them to surrender to Yugoslav forces, who subjected them to death marches back to Yugoslavia, resulting in the death of 70–80,000 people.

In the Pacific theatre, the Imperial Japanese Armed Forces conducted death marches of Allied POWs, including the 1942 Bataan Death March and the 1945 Sandakan Death Marches. The former forcibly transferred 60–80,000 POWs to Balanga, resulting in the deaths of 2,500–10,000 Filipino and 100–650 American POWs, while the latter caused the deaths of 2,345 Australian and British POWs, of which only 6 survived. Lieutenant-General Masaharu Homma was charged with failure to control his troops in 1945 in connection with the Bataan Death March. Both the Bataan and Sandakan death marches were judged by the International Military Tribunal for the Far East to be war crimes.

=== Population transfer in the Soviet Union ===
Population transfer in the Soviet Union refers to the forced transfer of various groups from the 1930s up to the 1950s ordered by Joseph Stalin and may be classified into the following broad categories: deportations of "anti-Soviet" categories of population (often classified as "enemies of workers"), deportations of entire nationalities, labor force transfer, and organized migrations in opposite directions to fill the ethnically cleansed territories. Soviet archives documented 390,000 deaths during kulak forced resettlement and up to 400,000 deaths of persons deported to forced settlements in the Soviet Union during the 1940s; however Steven Rosefield and Norman Naimark put overall deaths closer to some 1 to 1.5 million perishing as a result of the deportations — of those deaths, the deportation of Crimean Tatars and the deportation of Chechens were recognized as genocides by Ukraine and the European Parliament respectively.

=== Lydda Death March ===
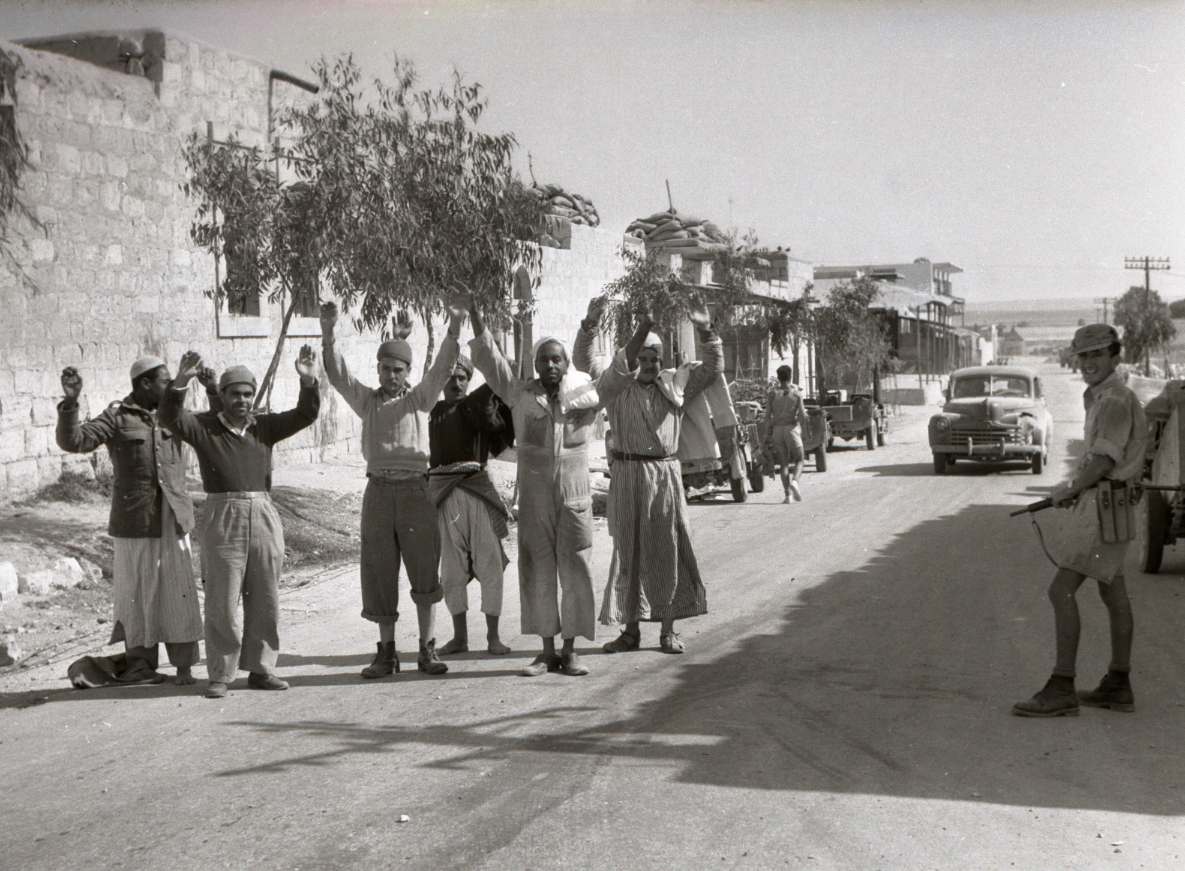
Palestinians detained in Ramle by Israeli forces, 12 July 1948

During the 1948 Palestine war, 50,000-70,000 Palestinians were expelled from the cities of Lydda (also spelled Lod) and Ramla by the Israeli military. Occurring as a part of the broader 1948 Palestinian expulsion and flight and the Nakba, the operation is widely considered to have been an instance of ethnic cleansing. Ramla'a residents were expelled by bus, but Lydda's residents had to walk 15–25 kilometres (10–15 miles) to meet up with the lines of the Arab Legion. Many people died from the heat, thirst, and exhaustion on the journey and the event has come to be known as the Lydda Death March.

Reports vary regarding how many died. Palestinian historian Aref al-Aref estimated 500 died in the expulsion from Lydda, and that 350 of that number died from thirst and exhaustion. Nur Masalha estimated 350 deaths in the "expulsion and forced march" from Lydda. Israeli historian Benny Morris has written that it was a "handful and perhaps dozens." John Bagot Glubb wrote that "nobody will ever know how many children died." Nimr al-Khatib estimated that 335 people died. Morris calls this number "certainly an exaggeration", while historian Michael Palumbo called Khatib's estimate "a very conservative figure."

=== Korean War ===
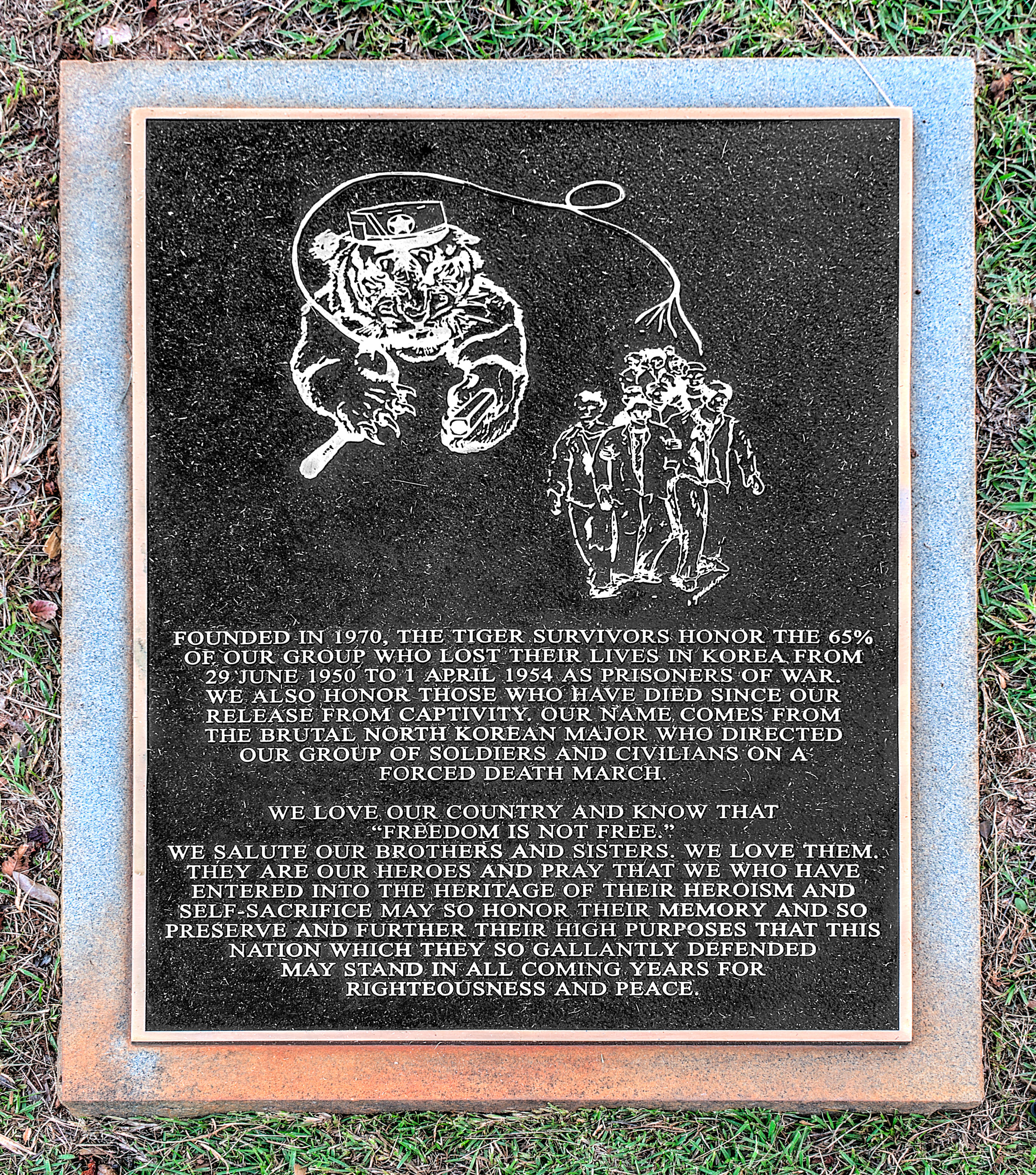
Tiger Death March memorial at Andersonville National Historic Site

In 1950, prisoners who were held by the North Koreans underwent what became known as the "Tiger Death March". The march occurred while North Korea was being overrun by United Nations forces. As North Korean forces retreated to the Yalu River on the border with China, they evacuated their prisoners with them. On 31 October 1950, some 845 prisoners, including about eighty non-combatants, left Manpo and went upriver, arriving in Chunggang on 8 November 1950. A year later, fewer than 300 of the prisoners were still alive. The march was named after the brutal North Korean colonel who presided over it, his nickname was "The Tiger". Among the prisoners was war correspondont Philippe Gigantès and George Blake, an MI6 officer who had been stationed in Seoul. While he was being held as a prisoner, he became a KGB double agent.

In the winter of 1951, 200,000 South Korean National Defense Corps soldiers were forcibly marched by their commanders, with 50,000 to 90,000 soldiers starving to death or dying of disease during the march or in training camps. This incident is known as the National Defense Corps incident.

=== Phnom Penh ===
The Khmer Rouge marked the beginning of their rule with the forced evacuation of various cities including Phnom Penh, Cambodia.

== See also ==
- Population transfer
- Forced displacement
- List of ethnic cleansing campaigns
- Carolean Death March (1718–1719)
- Samsun deportations (1921–1922)
- March of the Living
- Sayfo (1914–1924)
- Flight and expulsion of Germans (1944–1950)
- Population exchange between Greece and Turkey

== Sources ==
- Akçam, Taner (2019). "When Was the Decision to Annihilate the Armenians Taken?". Journal of Genocide Research. 21 (4): 457–480. doi:10.1080/14623528.2019.1630893. S2CID 199042672.
- Gaunt, David (2006). Massacres, Resistance, Protectors: Muslim-Christian Relations in Eastern Anatolia During World War I. Gorgias Press. ISBN 978-1-59333-301-0.
- Suny, Ronald Grigor (2015). "They Can Live in the Desert but Nowhere Else": A History of the Armenian Genocide. Princeton University Press. ISBN 978-1-4008-6558-1.
