= Francisco de Paula del Villar y Lozano =

Spanish architect (1828–1901)

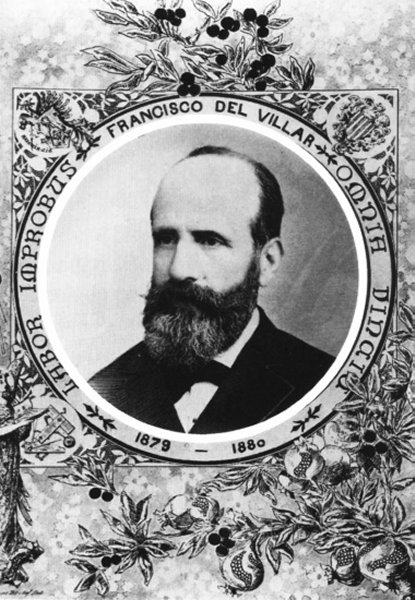
- Francisco de Paula del Villar y Lozano
- Born: 1828; Murcia
- Died: 1901 (aged 72–73); Barcelona
- Resting place: Poblenou Cemetery
- Citizenship: Spanish
- Education: Academia de Bellas Artes de San Fernando
- Occupation: Architect
- Years active: 1852-1901
- Children: Francisco de Paula del Villar y Carmona
- Buildings: Badalona town hall (1876); Chapel of the Mother of God, Santa Maria de Montserrat Abbey
- Projects: Sagrada Família, Barcelona (initial designs)

Francisco de Paula del Villar y Lozano (1828, in Murcia – 1901, in Barcelona) was a Spanish architect.

== Biography ==
Villar studied architecture in Madrid at the Academia de Bellas Artes de San Fernando, and qualified in 1852. The following year he settled in Barcelona and was elected a member of what is now known as the Reial Acadèmia Catalana de Belles Arts de Sant Jordi. In 1854 he designed a series of emergency hospitals for victims of the cholera epidemic. Amongst other public appointments he became president of the Association of Architects and director of the Higher School of Architecture.

He held the post of diocesan architect from 1874 to 1892, and was succeeded in it by his son Francesc de Paula del Villar i Carmona. He restored the church of Santa Maria del Pi, the Basílica de Santa Maria de Vilafranca and the Casa de Misericòrdia; he also designed many parish churches and the apse of the basilica of the Monastery of Montserrat, a commission on which Antoni Gaudí worked under him in a junior capacity.

== Sagrada Família ==
In 1877 he was commissioned by the Associació de Devots de Sant Josep to build the church of the Sagrada Família in Barcelona. Villar planned a Neo-Gothic design, of which only the crypt was built. He abandoned the project in 1883 as a result of disagreements with Joan Martorell, the architect advising José Maria Bocabella, president of the Associació de Devots de Sant Josep and promoter of the project. The job was offered to Martorell, who turned it down, and instead recommended Antoni Gaudi. Gaudi then took charge of the project and made it into his magnum opus.

Architectural work by Villa

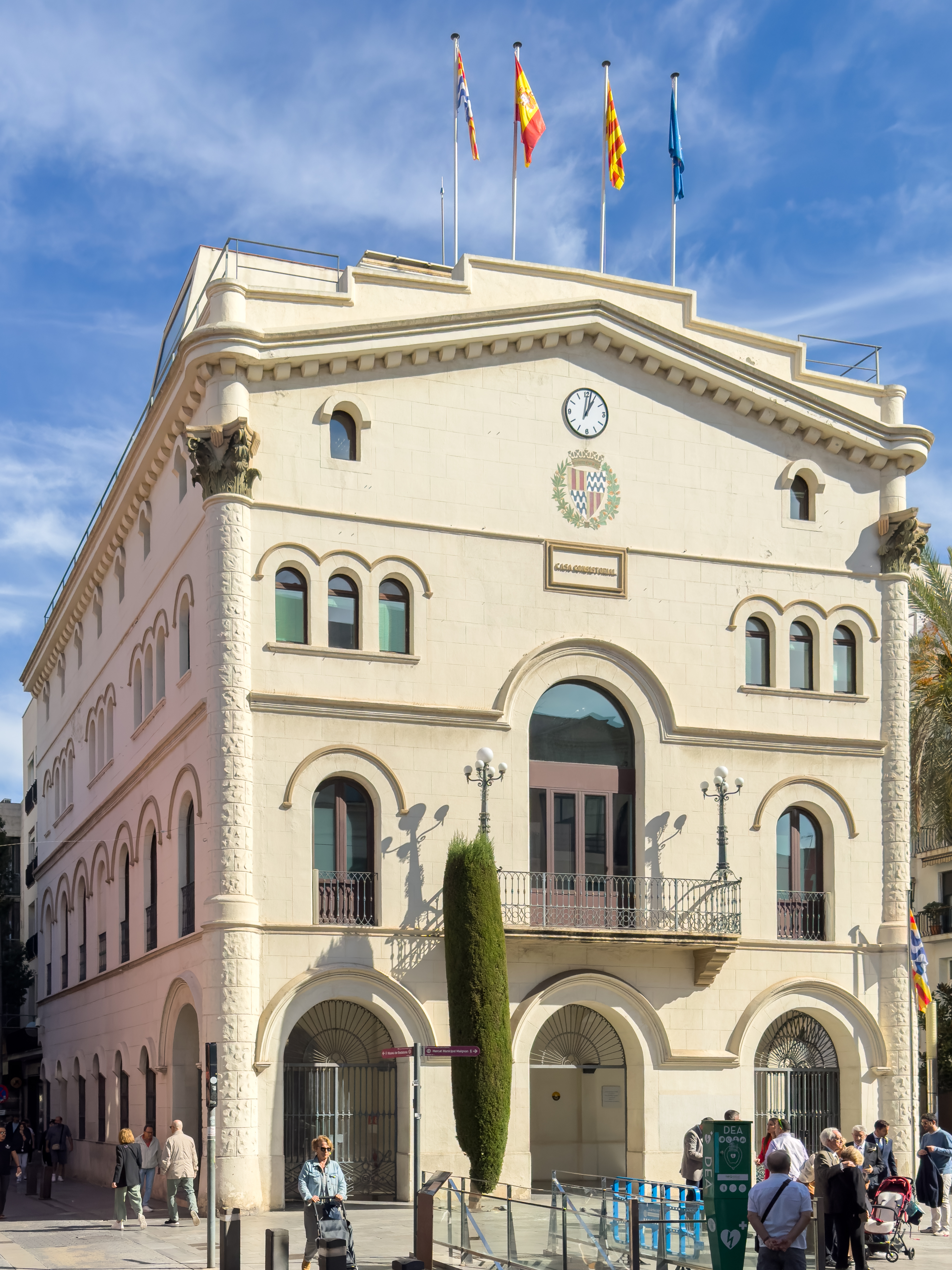
Badalona town hall (1876)

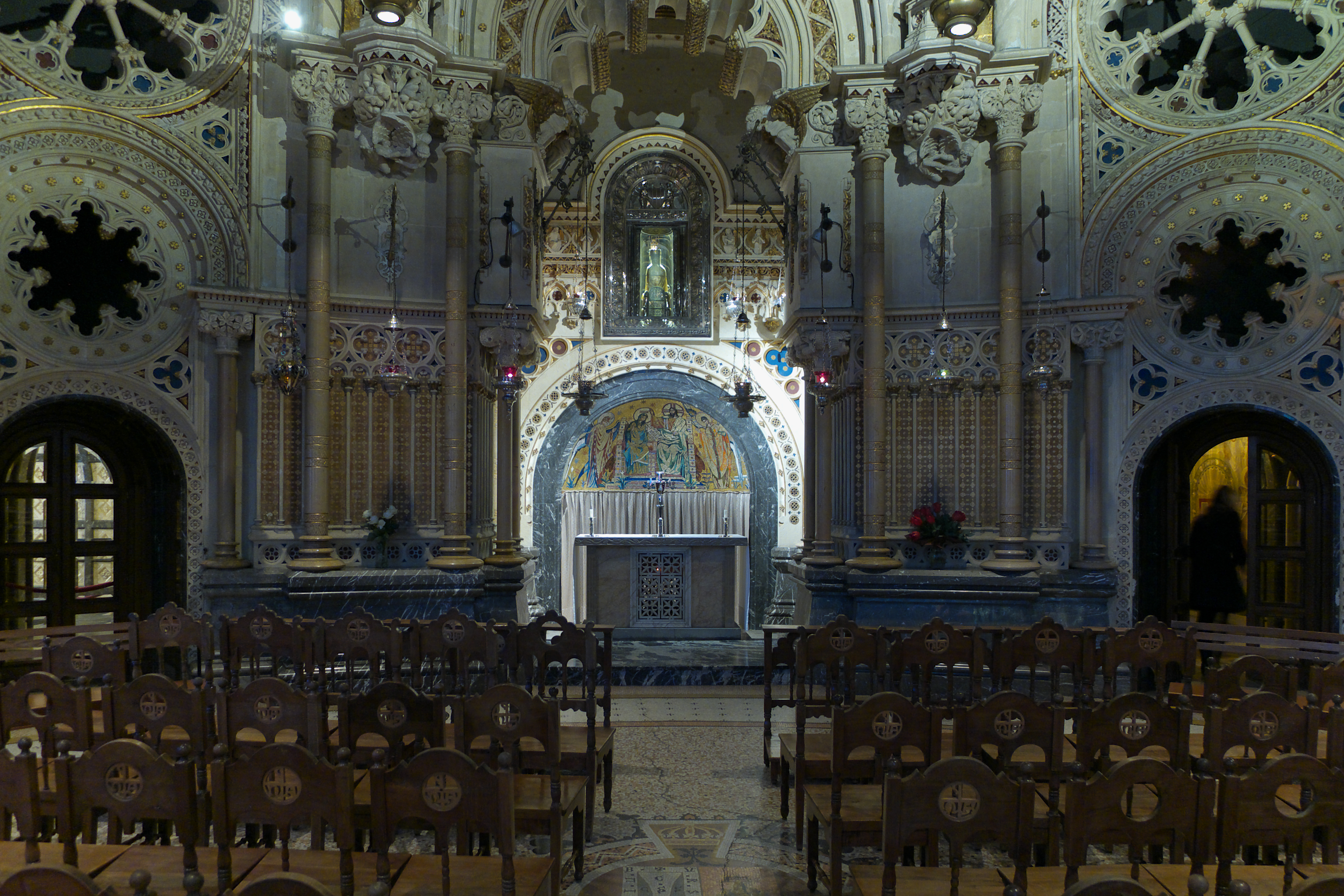
Chapel of the Mother of God, Santa Maria de Montserrat Abbey

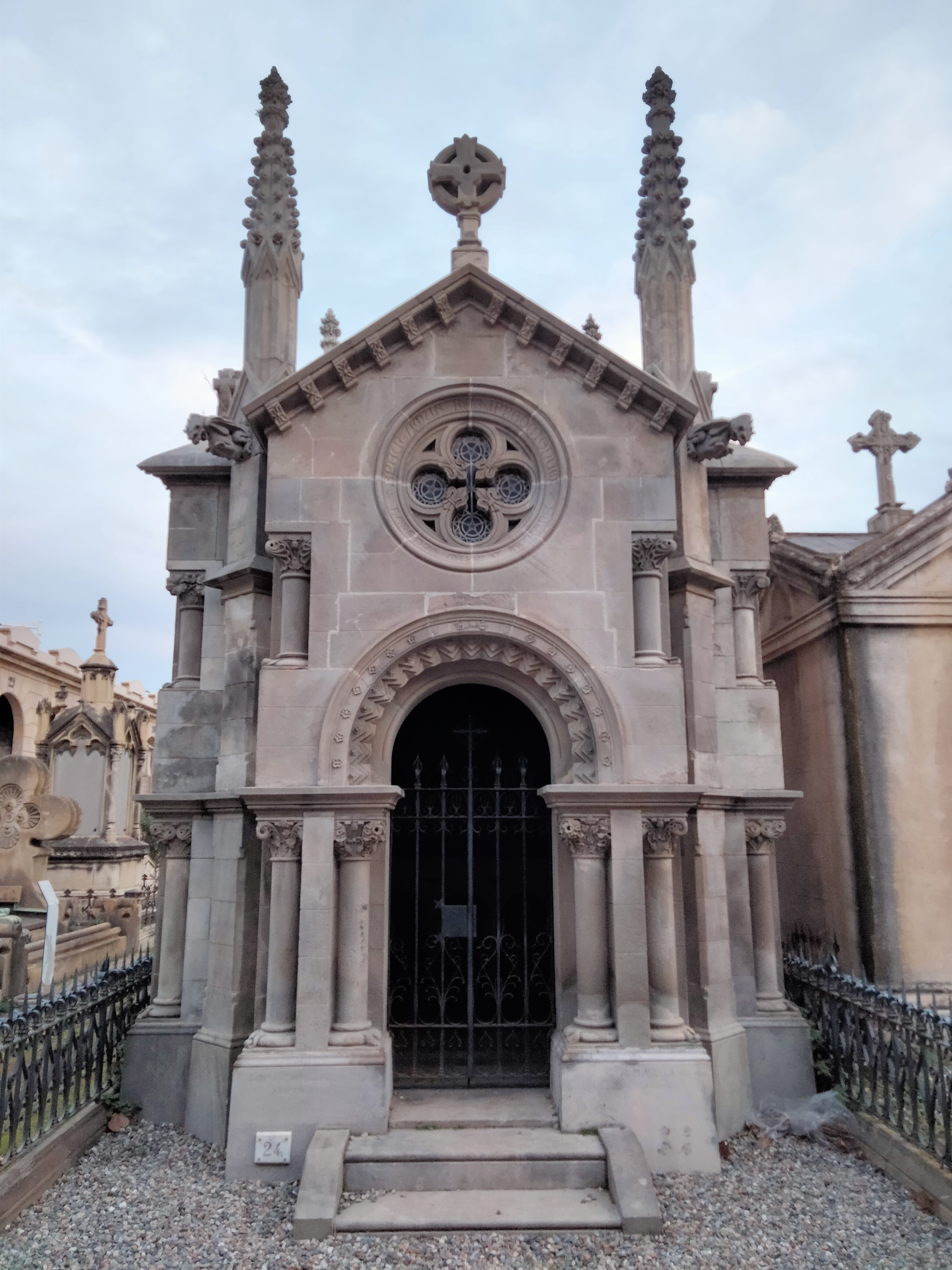
Mausoleum of Llorenç Milà

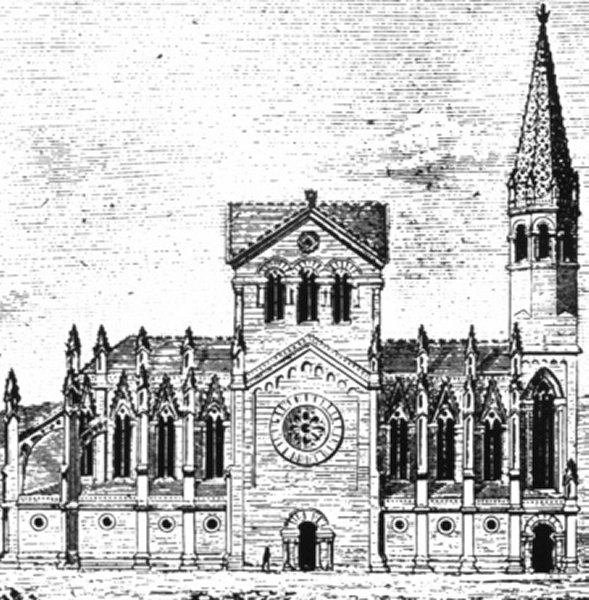
Villar's plan for the Sagrada Família

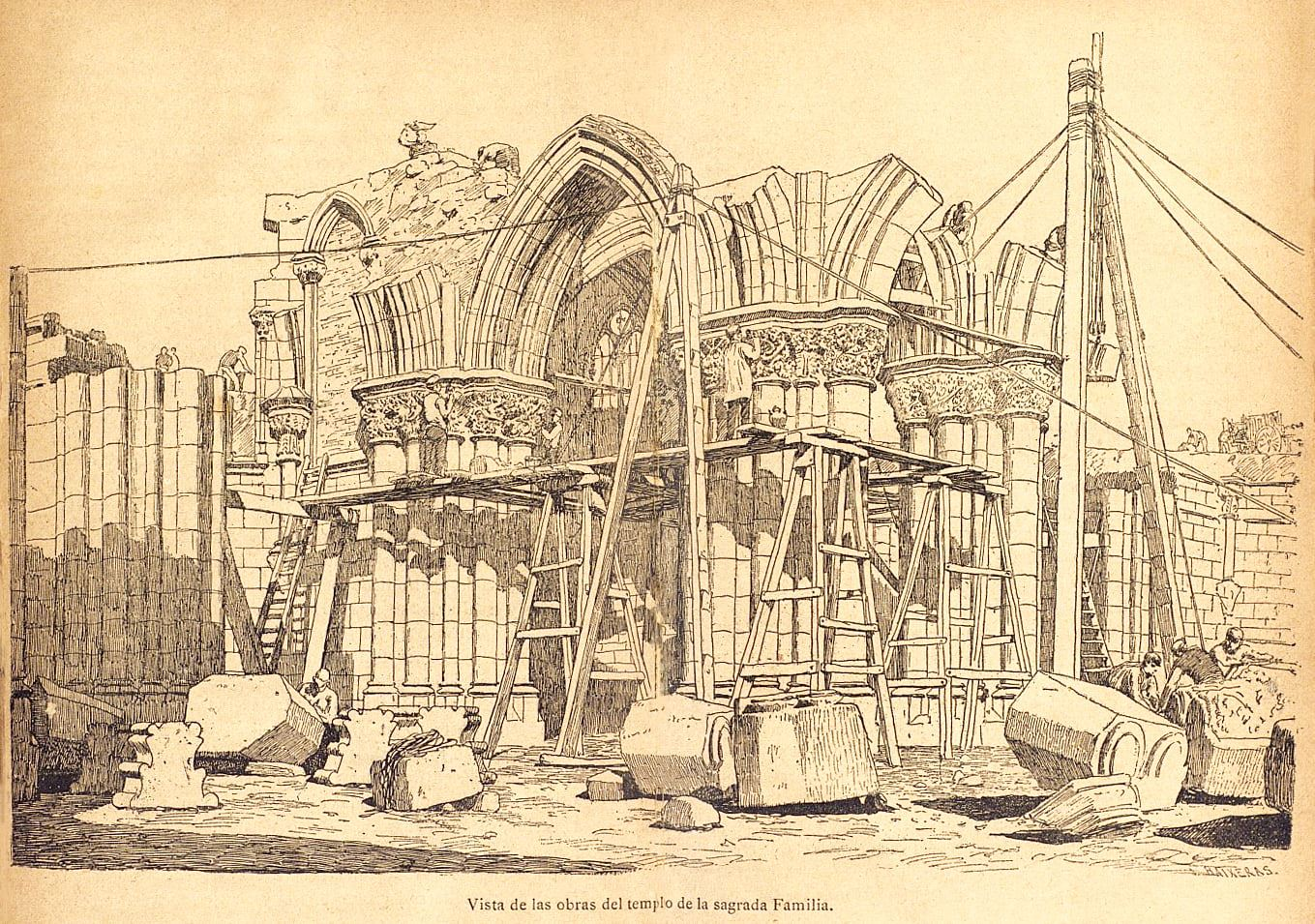
Sketch of Villar's crypt for the Sagrada Família

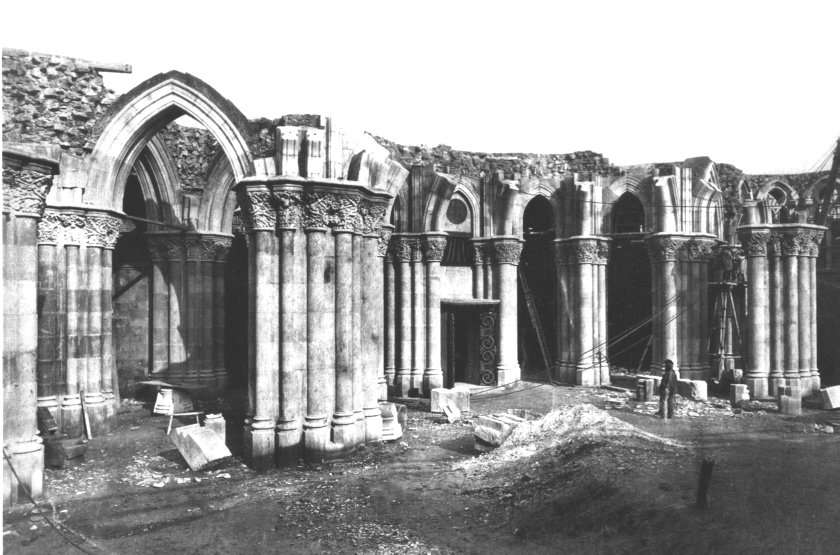
Construction of the Sagrada Família crypt (1886)

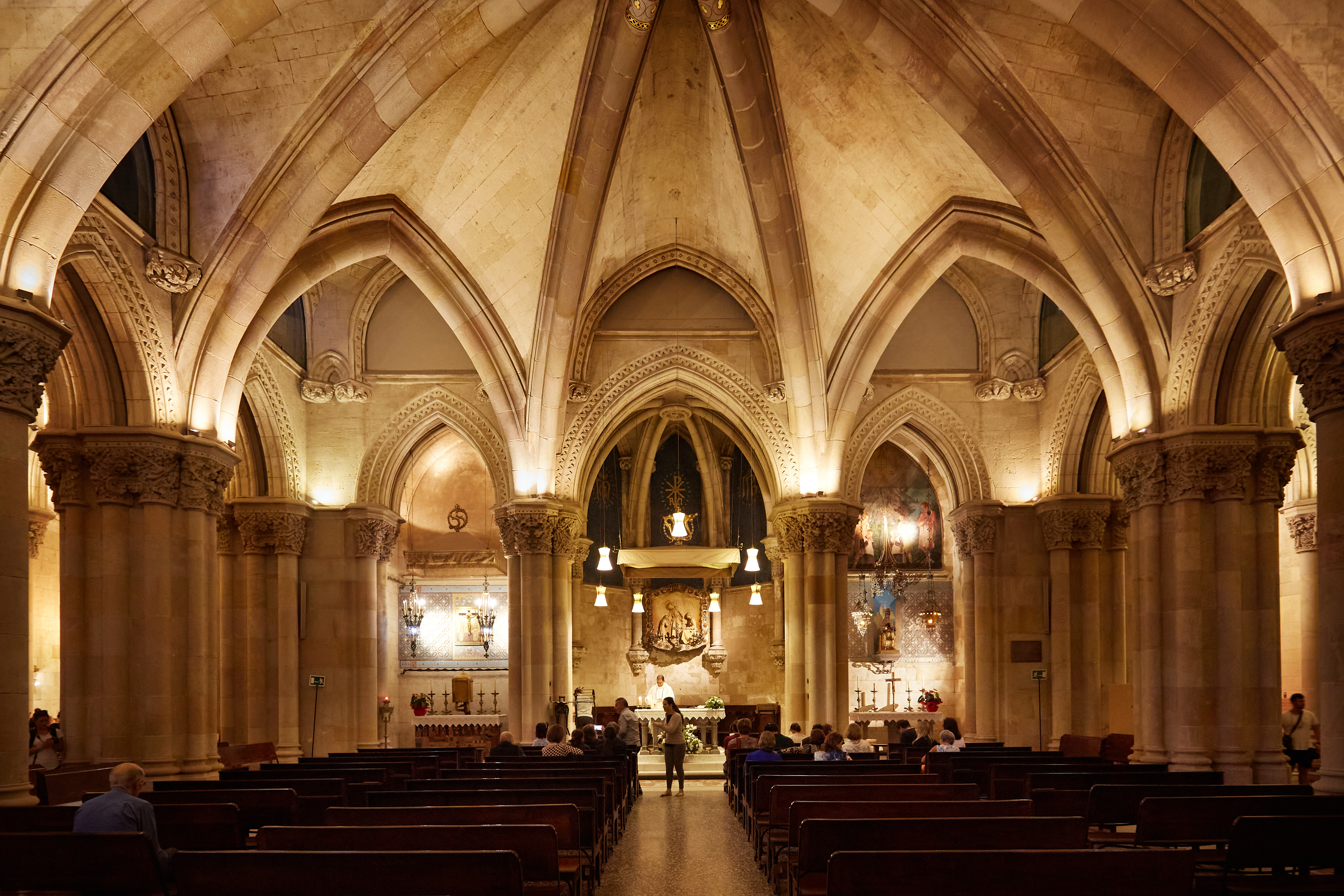
Crypt of the Sagrada Familia
