= Chunggang County =

Chunggang County 중강군
- County

Korean transcription(s)
  - Hanja: 中江郡
  - McCune-Reischauer: Chunggang kun
  - Revised Romanization: Junggang-gun
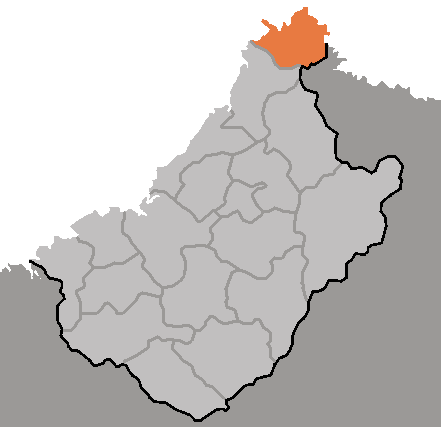
- Map of Chagang showing the location of Chunggang
- Country: North Korea
- Province: Chagang Province
- Administrative divisions: 1 ŭp, 1 workers' district, 8 ri

Area
  - Total: 620 km^{2} (240 sq mi)

Population (2008)
  - Total: 41,022
  - Density: 66/km^{2} (170/sq mi)

Chunggang County is a kun (county), in northern Chagang province, North Korea. It was originally part of Huchang county in Ryanggang, and for that reason older sources still identify it as being part of Huchang. The county seat was originally known as Chunggangjin (중강진), but is now known as Chunggang ŭp. Chunggang looks across the Yalu River at China, and borders Ryanggang province to the south.

The Chunggang Revolutionary Site is associated with Kim Hyŏng-jik.

It has been reported that an Intermediate-range ballistic missile base was constructed in Chunggang in the early 1990s, and that its missiles are targeted at Okinawa.

== Administrative divisions ==
Chunggang County is divided into 1 ŭp (town), 1 rodongjagu (workers' district) and 8 ri (villages):

- Chunggang-ŭp
- Hoha-rodongjagu
- Changhŭng-ri
- Changsŏng-ri
- Chungdŏng-ri
- Chungsang-ri
- Kŏnha-ri
- Osu-ri
- Sangjang-ri
- T'osŏng-ri

== Climate ==
Chunggang has a monsoon influenced humid continental climate (Köppen Climate Classification Dwa) with hot summers and severely cold winters. The climate features very large differences between summer and winter temperatures. On January 12, 1933, a temperature of -43 °C was recorded at Chunggangjin - the lowest ever recorded in the Korean Peninsula. The average January temperature is -16.0 °C, with temperatures rising to a July average of 22.5 °C.

Climate data for Chunggang (1991–2020 normals, extremes 1915–present)
Month	Jan	Feb	Mar	Apr	May	Jun	Jul	Aug	Sep	Oct	Nov	Dec	Year
Record high °C (°F)	6.0 (42.8)	12.0 (53.6)	23.0 (73.4)	31.0 (87.8)	34.0 (93.2)	36.1 (97.0)	40.2 (104.4)	39.0 (102.2)	31.0 (87.8)	28.1 (82.6)	19.0 (66.2)	10.2 (50.4)	40.2 (104.4)
Mean daily maximum °C (°F)	−7.5 (18.5)	−1.8 (28.8)	5.9 (42.6)	15.2 (59.4)	22.7 (72.9)	26.5 (79.7)	28.9 (84.0)	28.2 (82.8)	23.4 (74.1)	15.6 (60.1)	3.9 (39.0)	−5.4 (22.3)	13.0 (55.4)
Daily mean °C (°F)	−15.9 (3.4)	−10.2 (13.6)	−0.9 (30.4)	7.7 (45.9)	14.9 (58.8)	19.6 (67.3)	22.9 (73.2)	21.8 (71.2)	15.4 (59.7)	7.3 (45.1)	−2.3 (27.9)	−12.6 (9.3)	5.6 (42.1)
Mean daily minimum °C (°F)	−22.8 (−9.0)	−17.9 (−0.2)	−7.4 (18.7)	0.8 (33.4)	8.0 (46.4)	13.9 (57.0)	18.3 (64.9)	17.3 (63.1)	9.7 (49.5)	0.9 (33.6)	−7.5 (18.5)	−18.8 (−1.8)	−0.5 (31.1)
Record low °C (°F)	−43.6 (−46.5)	−36.1 (−33.0)	−32.2 (−26.0)	−12.8 (9.0)	−5.2 (22.6)	4.7 (40.5)	9.0 (48.2)	4.1 (39.4)	−2.5 (27.5)	−13.2 (8.2)	−30.0 (−22.0)	−36.1 (−33.0)	−43.6 (−46.5)
Average precipitation mm (inches)	4.8 (0.19)	9.1 (0.36)	17.4 (0.69)	32.3 (1.27)	62.7 (2.47)	89.8 (3.54)	172.7 (6.80)	150.1 (5.91)	60.8 (2.39)	33.7 (1.33)	27.5 (1.08)	12.8 (0.50)	673.7 (26.52)
Average precipitation days (≥ 0.1 mm)	3.2	3.7	4.9	6.4	8.9	10.2	11.4	9.8	5.9	6.0	6.0	5.3	81.7
Average snowy days	4.8	5.0	4.7	1.5	0.0	0.0	0.0	0.0	0.1	0.5	4.8	6.6	28.0
Average relative humidity (%)	78.9	74.3	69.0	64.8	68.6	76.7	82.0	82.4	78.4	73.6	77.0	78.0	75.3
Mean monthly sunshine hours	151	158	188	184	192	168	155	149	148	169	130	128	1,920
Source 1: Korea Meteorological Administration
Source 2: Deutscher Wetterdienst (sun, 1961–1990), (Note: Station ID for Chunggang is 47014 Use this station ID to locate the sunshine duration) Meteo Climat (extremes)

== See also ==
- Geography of North Korea
- Administrative divisions of North Korea
- Chagang
- Linjiang Yalu River Bridge
