= Silverstream Priory =

Roman Catholic monastery in Stamullen, Ireland

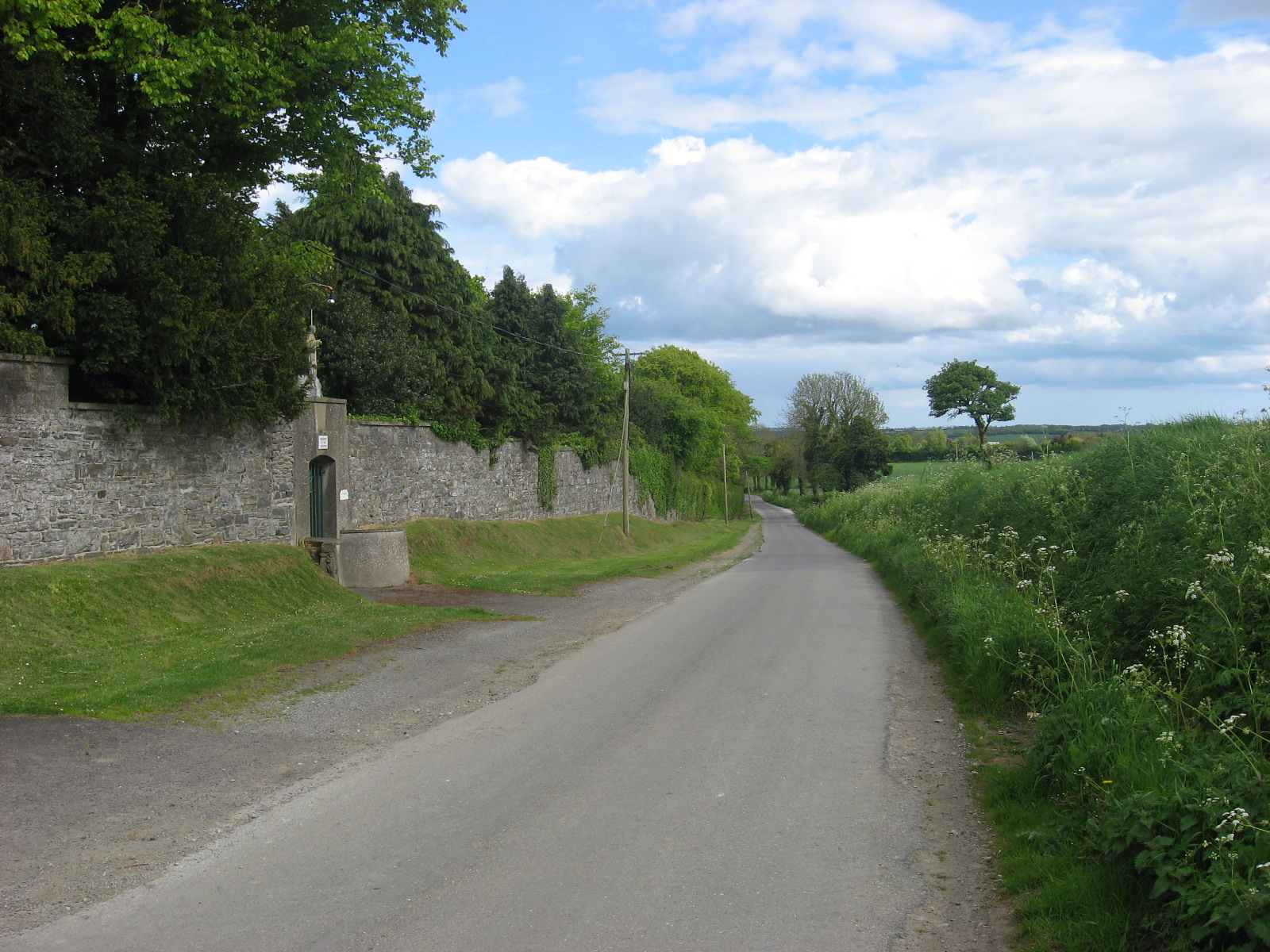
- Location in 2010
- Interactive map of Silverstream Priory

Monastery information
- Order: Benedictines
- Established: 2012
- Diocese: Meath

People
- Founder: Mark Daniel Kirby
- Prior: Basil Mary McCabe

Architecture
- Status: Active

Site
- Location: Stamullen, County Meath, Ireland
- Coordinates: 53°38′17″N 6°17′23″W
- Public access: Yes
- Website: http://cenacleosb.org/

Silverstream Priory is a Roman Catholic monastery in Stamullen, County Meath, Ireland, founded in 2012. The monastery is an autonomous diocesan priory of the Benedictine Monks of Perpetual Adoration.

Mark Daniel Kirby (b. 1952) is the founder and was the first superior of the priory until his resignation in 2020. As of March 2023, Fr. Basil Mary McCabe was its prior.

== History ==
The community's history began in Oklahoma in 2007, when Bishop Edward James Slattery of the Diocese of Tulsa invited Mark Daniel Kirby, then a Cistercian monk, to form a monastery with the mission of prayer for priests. In 2009, a year designated by Pope Benedict XVI as a "year of the priest", the bishop inaugurated the community under the title Monastery of Our Lady of the Cenacle. In 2011, flooding in Tulsa made the community's residence uninhabitable, and Fr. Kirby obtained Bishop Slattery's permission to move the community.

In autumn 2011 the monks were invited by Bishop Michael Smith to relocate to the Diocese of Meath. In March 2012, the community moved into a former religious house in the village of Stamullen in County Meath. Based on a local geographical name, they adopted the name Silverstream Priory for the monastery.

In February 2017, the community reached a milestone with the formal approval of its constitutions by the Holy See, leading to the canonical establishment of the Benedictine Monks of Perpetual Adoration as a monastic institute of consecrated life in the diocese of Meath. This made Silverstream Priory the first new monastery in the county since the abolition of monasteries under Henry VIII in 1536.

In 2020, the National Catholic Reporter and The Tablet reported that the priory underwent a diocesan visitation, ordered by Thomas Deenihan, Bishop of Meath, and conducted from 9 to 12 June 2020 by Brendan Coffey, the Benedictine Abbot of Glenstal Abbey, Richard Purcell, the Trappist Abbot of Mount Mellaray Abbey, and Gearoid Dullea, a priest of the Diocese of Cork and Ross. Kirby also resigned his position as superior, and Coffey was named administrator.

== Life ==
The monastery describes its historical inspiration in these terms:

Silverstream Priory is a providential realisation of the cherished project of Abbot Celestino Maria Colombo, O.S.B. (1874–1935), who, following the impetus given by Catherine–Mectilde de Bar in the 17th century, sought to establish a house of Benedictine monks committed to ceaseless prayer before the Most Holy Sacrament of the Altar in a spirit of reparation.

The monastery hence places a special emphasis on Eucharistic Adoration for the sanctification of Catholic priests. The monks celebrate the traditional Benedictine liturgy (Divine Office and the Mass) in the pre-Vatican II form (Tridentine Mass), in Latin and with Gregorian chant.

As of 2020, the monastery has 15 members, of whom three are priests. Of the monks, ten are professed members, while five are novices.

== Priory buildings ==
The priory house was originally built in 1843 by the Preston family (the Viscounts Gormanston). From 1941 to 1955, the priory was inhabited by the Brothers Hospitallers of Saint John of God, who added a church in 1952 named in honor of Saint Thérèse of Lisieux. Contemplative nuns of the Order of the Visitation of Holy Mary resided at the house from 1955 to 2010. In 2018, the former church was converted into a wing for the priory's novitiate.

== See also ==
- List of abbeys and priories in Ireland
