= Laurence Gaughran =

Irish Catholic bishop

- Roman Catholic Bishop of Meath
- Church: Roman Catholic Church
- Diocese: Meath
- See: Meath
- In office: 1906 – 1928
- Other posts: Head teacher of St Finian's College, Mullingar; Parish Priest of Mullingar; Pastor of Kells; Vicar-General of Meath

Orders
- Ordination: 2 June 1868

Personal details
- Born: Laurence Gaughran; September 24, 1842 Lobinstown, Ireland
- Died: June 14, 1928 (aged 85) Mullingar, Ireland
- Buried: Grounds of Mullingar Cathedral
- Denomination: Roman Catholicism
- Education: St Patrick's College, Maynooth

Laurence Gaughran (born Lobinstown 24 September 1842 – died Mullingar 14 June 1928) was the Roman Catholic Bishop of Meath, Ireland from 1906 until his death.

== Life ==
Gaughran was educated at St Finian's College, Navan and St Patrick's College, Maynooth. He was ordained 2 June 1868. He was Head teacher of St Finian's College, Mullingar from 1872 to 1877; Parish Priest of Mullingar from 1877 to 1885; Pastor of Kells in 1885; Vicar-General of Meath from 1886 until his appointment as bishop. He is buried in the grounds of his cathedral.

Catholic Church titles
Preceded by Mathew Gaffney	Bishop of Meath; 1906 – 1928	Succeeded by Thomas Mulvany
