= Archdeacon of Kells =

Medieval ecclesiastical post

Archdeacon of Kells, alias Archdeacon of Nobber Archdeacon of Kells
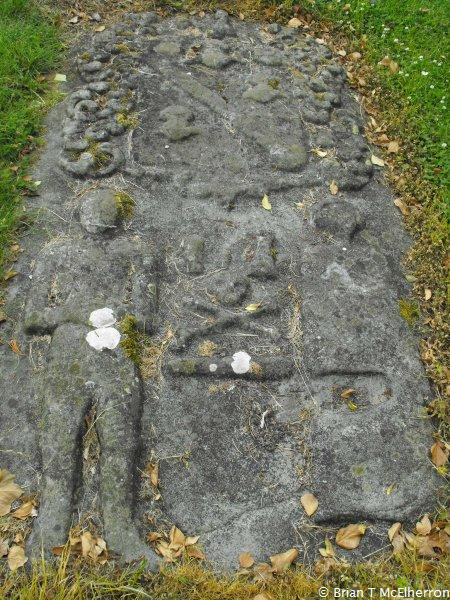
- Motif in old Nobber graveyard, male figure wearing a Mitre
- Church: Catholic Church in Medieval Ireland
- Archdiocese: Diocese of Meath
- Province: Kingdom of Meath
- See: Bishop of Meath
- Quashed: before 1622

The Archdeacon of Kells (Middle English: Kenlys, Kenlis Irish: Ceanannas), alias the Archdeacon of Nobber (Middle English: Nobire, Nobbir, Nobyre, Irish: an Obair, meaning 'the work'), was a medieval ecclesiastical post in the Diocese of Meath in the Kingdom of Meath, Ireland. The archdeaconry was officially established sometime between the 11th and 13th centuries, and was annexed to the Rectory of Nobber. In the 16th century, the office was briefly united to the Bishopric of Meath, but afterwards separated again. As a consequence of the Reformation, the Archbishop of Armagh (Church of Ireland) held the "Archdeacony of Kells, in commendam 1569 to 1584". Sometime before 1622, the Archdeacon of Kells and Rectory of Nobber were permanently united to the bishopric of Meath.

== Background ==
Before the dissolution of the monasteries and Henrican reforms of the 16th century took full effect in Ireland, there were Archdeacons of Kells, County Meath. The Diocese of Kells was established sometime after the Synod of Kells (1152), and incorporated with the Diocese of Meath after 1211. The deanery of Kells was created by Simon (de) Rochford, Bishop of Meath, in 1216. At the time, it was one of twelve rural deaneries in Meath, later becoming one of the two archdeaconries of the same diocese.

Nobber was once an important town in the Kingdom of Meath, and the Rectory of Nobber was united to this dignity; thus the holder was sometimes called Rector of Nobber, Parson of Nobber, or most commonly styled Archdeacon of Nobber. In medieval times, "Kells" is called Middle English: Kenlys, Kenlis, Keneleis, Keneles, with "Nobber" expressed as Middle English: Nobire, Nobbir, Nobir, Nebyre, Nobyre, Nober. Confusingly, the archdeacon of Kells held the Rectory of Nobber, while the archdeacon of Meath held the Rectory of Kells. (Note: Lawlor (1912) writes: "In Sweteman's rent-roll of Nobber, a place is mentioned by the name of Brakschise : it is elsewhere called Braktys. The first syllable of this name is evidently breac. Can it be Brittas in the parish of Nobber?".)

== Archdeacons ==
In the High Middle Ages it was the most senior diocesan position below a bishop in the Roman Catholic Church. An archdeacon is often responsible for administration within an archdeaconry, which is the principal subdivision of the diocese. It is nearly impossible to fully catalogue the succession of holders of this ancient office. Nonetheless, the information below is preserved.

* aft. = after
* bef. = before
* d. = died
* res. = resigned
* att. = attainted

Dates	Name of holder	Extracts from papal, ecclesiastical and annalistic sources
bef. 1047 – 1047 (d.)	Cuduiligh mac Gaithine	"son of Gaethin, Archdeacon of the Abbey of Kells, died", Irish: "Cúdúiligh, mac Gaithine, fos airchinneach (Note: See McInerney – "Irish: airchinneach" translates as "erenagh":- "Hist: Hereditary steward of church lands", and "Irish: fos airchinneach" translates as "Vice-Erenagh", so sources are erroneous to call "Cuduiligh" ("Fosairchinneach") an "Archdeacon".) Cenannsa, décc" and "Cuduiligh, son of Gaithine Fosairchinneach of Ceanannus, died.".
bef. 1276 – aft. 1276	Synan	"in Ecelesia Midensi Archidiaconi".
bef. 1281 – 1287 (res.)	Thomas St. Leger	"elected Bishop of Meath", "on 12th of July 1286", "appointed Bishop of Meath in 1287", and "died in a very advanced age, in December, 1320 or 1321".
bef. 1288 – 1288 (d.)	John de Dubleton, or Dumbilton?	"Archdeacon. (But quoere, whether of Kells, or of Meath?)", "died 18th November 1288, and was buried at Kells".
bef. 1315 – bef. 1348 (res.)	Thomas St Leger	"Archdeacon of Kells in 1315", but "Archdeacon of Meath in 1350, and consecrated Bishop of Meath in 1350, died St. Bartholomew's day (24th August), 1352".
bef. 1348 – aft. 1369	Henry Powell	"1 December 1348: Henry Powel, Archdeacon of Kenlys". and in 1362, and in 1367, and in 1369 when Archbishop Sweteman wrote to "Master Henry Powle, Archdeacon of Kenlys" on 28 August, seeking details of "revenues", and 19 September, "warning him of the consequences of disobedience to this, his second letter".
bef. 1374 – bef. 1380	Nicholas Runnehy?	"appears as Arch deacon, either of Meath of Kells".
bef. 1380 – bef. 1383	1851 Walter de Brugge	"Walter de Bingee (or Brugge)".
bef. 1383 – bef. 1384	Richard Broun (Brown)	
bef. 1384 – bef. 1417 (d.) (Note: Healy (1908) erroneously lists "The Bishop of Telese in Campania" as Archdeacon in 1401, misinterpreting text: "... bishop of Telese, the archdeacon of Kells (Kenllis) ... and the official of Armagh." in Calendar of Papal Registers.)	Adam del Naas	"Adam Naas (1384–1415)", "Adam del la Naas (1411)", "24 Nov 1412: Adam del Naase, Archdeacon of Kenlis", "17 Apr 1413: Adam del Naas, Archdeacon of Kenlys". died before 1417.
bef. 1417 – 1423 (res.)	Robert Sutton	Styled in 1417 as "Archdeacon of Nobber", with "Mandate to collate and assign to Robert Sutton, .. the still void archdeaconry of Kenlys .. which, on its voidance by the death of Adam le Nase, Robert obtained by collation". He retained possession in 1418, but the "archdeaconry, .. possession of which Robert unlawfully detained", was confiscated on 17 July 1423.
1423 – 1428 (d.)	Thomas Rosellis or Rossell	"1420, Thomas Rosell[is], perpetual vicar of St. Peter's, Drogheda, .. bachelor of canon law. Reservation of the canonry and prebend of Swerdes in Dublin, ..; notwithstanding that he holds .. the canonry and prebend of Glemethan in Dublin and the archdeaconry of Kenlys in Meath, which .. he has not got possession, and about which prebend and archdeaconry he is litigating in the Roman court", "1423, Thomas Rosell[is], .. litigating .. about the .. archdeaconry of Kenlys .., to which is annexed the parish church of Nobyre, of which (quorum) he has not got possession, .. was adjudged to him and perpetual silence imposed on Robert" in 1423. Died circa 1428.
1423 – 1428 (res.)	John Stanyhurst	"the late Thomas Rosellis, archdeacon of Kenlys, in his cause long ventilated in the apostolic palace against John Stanyhurst, .. of which John was unduly detaining possession, as he still does, Rosellis obtained a definitive sentence by which the archdeaconry was adjudged to him and perpetual silence imposed on John", in 1428.
1428 – aft. 1428	Thomas Barby	"On 8th March 1429, To Thomas Barby, archdeacon of Kenlys in Meath, I.U.B. Collation and assignment of the said archdeaconry, .. to which is annexed the parish church of Nobir".
bef. 1434 – bef. 1467	John Stanyhurst	"9 Aug 1434: John Stanyhurst, archdeacon of Kells in Meath.", and "Archdeacon of Kells, and parson of Nobber in 1435". and 1464.
bef. 1467 – bef. 1525	James Porter	"archdeacon of Kells (de Kenlys) in the church of Meath, bachelor of canon law".
bef. 1525 – bef. 1532	John Treguran (or Tryguran)	"We do not know whether Tryguram resigned his benefice in 1528".
13 Feb 1532 – 15 July 1535 (d.), 1536 (att.)	Charles Reynolds	Cahir Magranyl, or McRanell, "Chale Mac Gravyll", "McRaynal, Charles Raynall .. died of an incurable fever the day before the Pope was due to appoint him Bishop of Elphin and Clonmacnoise, .. 15 July 1535".
1535 – aft. 1541	Thomas Lockwood	"Arch-deacon of Nobber".
aft. 1543 – bef. 1547	Edward Staples	"In 1543 King Henry VIII. united the Rectory of Nobber to the Archdeaconry of Kells".
aft. 1543 – 1565 (d.)	Thomas Lockwood	"After the separation of this dignity from its brief union with the Bishopric of Meath, we find Lockwood again Archdeacon in 1547", holding office until his death, in April 1565.
1565 – 1568 (res.) – 1584 (d.)	Thomas Lancaster	"styled archdeacon of nobber". "Archbishop of Armagh (Church of Ireland) in 1568". "On account of the Poverty of his See, he had a Licence dated 26 March, following his Consecration, to hold in Commendam, ... the Archdeaconry of Kells, together with the Rectory of Nobbir"; died 1584.

== Dissolution ==
In 1543, Edward Staples, Bishop of Meath, appropriated the Archdeaconry of Kells and the Rectory of Nobber to his Episcopal see, or rather the temporalities of the offices. The union was sealed by license from the king, dated 27 December 1544. Nonetheless, the Archdeaconry of Kells expressed itself again in 1547, with Thomas Lockwood still incumbent. The reason for the brief union of offices is unclear, but it is known many religious houses in Ireland resisted dissolution until well into the reign of Elizabeth I. On 12 March 1569, Thomas Lancaster, an English Protestant clergyman, consecrated Archbishop of Armagh (Church of Ireland) on 12 June 1568, was given license to hold in commendam the post of archdeaconry of kells, and the rectory of Nobber. According to the "Regal Visitation Book", sometime before 1622, the office of "Archdeaconry of kells, or Nobber", was permanently united to the bishopric of Meath.

== Notes and references ==
=== Primary sources ===
- Healy, John (1908). History of the diocese of Meath (PDF). Dublin: Association for Promoting Christian Knowledge – via Internet Archive is non-profit library of millions of free books, and more.
- Cogan, Anthony (1862). The diocese of Meath: ancient and modern (PDF) (Volume 1 ed.). Dublin: J.F. Fowler. p. 100.

=== Secondary sources ===
- Cotton, Henry (1851). Fasti ecclesiae Hibernicae: the succession of the prelates and members of the Cathedral bodies of Ireland (PDF) (Volume 2, The province of Lenister ed.). Princeton Theological Seminary Library: Hodges and Smith, Dublin. p. 41,176–177.
- Cotton, Henry (1851). Fasti ecclesiae Hibernicae: the succession of the prelates and members of the Cathedral bodies of Ireland (PDF) (Volume 3, The province of Ulster ed.). Princeton Theological Seminary Library: Hodges and Smith, Dublin. p. 19,112,115,126,130.
- Cotton, Henry (1851). Fasti ecclesiae Hibernicae: the succession of the prelates and members of the Cathedral bodies of Ireland (PDF) (Volume 5, The dioceses of Dublin, Glendaloch, and Kildare ed.). Allen County Public Library Genealogy Center: Hodges and Smith, Dublin. p. 225.
- Cotton, Henry (1860). Fasti Ecclesiae Hibernicae: Illustrations, corrections and additions to which are added indexes to the whole work. Vol. 5. Hodges and Smith.
- Ellis, Stephen G. (1976). "The Kildare Rebellion and the early Henrican reformation" (PDF). ARAN (Access to Research at NUI Galway). The Historical Journal, 19, 4. p. 825.
- Mason, William Monck (1820). The History and Antiquities of the Collegiate and Cathedral church of St. Patrick, near Dublin. W. Folds, Strand Street, Dublin. p. lxxxiii.
- Erck, John Caillard (1827). Erck, John Caillard (ed.). The Ecclesiastical Register containing the names of the dignitaries, and parochial clergy, in Ireland. Stanford Library: R. Milliken and Son, N. Mahon, and R.M. Tims, Grafton Street. p. 23.
- Fryde, Edmund Boleslav (2003). Royal Historical Society, Handbook of British Chronology (3rd ed., repr. with corrections ed.). Cambridge: Cambridge University Press. p. 357.
- Cox, Richard (1689). Hibernia anglicana, or, The history of Ireland, from the conquest thereof by the English, to this present time with an introductory discourse touching the ancient state of that kingdom and a new and exact map of the same. London: H. Clark. p. 223.
- Potterton, Michael (2014). "The Archaeology and History of Medieval Trim, County Meath" (PDF). p. 4,12,15.
- Ware, James (1739). "The whole works of Sir James Ware concerning Ireland" (Volume 1 ed.). Astor Library, New York: E. Jones, Clarendon Street. p. 95,144.
- Bliss; Twemlow (1904). "'Lateran Regesta 90: 1400–1401', Calendar of Papal Registers Relating To Great Britain and Ireland: 1398–1404" (Volume 5 ed.). His Majesty's stationery Office. pp. 397–412.
- Bliss; Twemlow (1904). "'Lateran Regesta 152: 1411–1412', in Calendar of Papal Registers Relating To Great Britain and Ireland: 1404–1415" (Volume 6 ed.). His Majesty's stationery Office. pp. 242–248.
- Twemlow, J A (1906). "'Lateran Regesta 219 & 227', in Calendar of Papal Registers Relating To Great Britain and Ireland: 1417–1431" (Volume 7 ed.). His Majesty's stationery Office. pp. 94–98, 238–240.
- Twemlow, J A (1909). "'Lateran Regesta 282 & 289', in Calendar of Papal Registers Relating To Great Britain and Ireland: 1427–1447" (Volume 8 ed.). His Majesty's stationery Office. pp. 50–62, 107–111.
- Twemlow, J A (1933). "'Lateran Regesta 662: 1467', in Calendar of Papal Registers Relating To Great Britain and Ireland: 1458–1471" (Volume 12 ed.). His Majesty's stationery Office. pp. 397–412, 604–608.
- Record Commission (1830). "State papers, published under the authority of His Majesty's Commission. King Henry the Eighth" (PDF) (Volume 2 ed.). University of California Libraries: London: G. Eyre and A. Strahan, printers to the King's Most Excellent Majesty, etc. p. 315.
- Herron, Thomas (2007). Spenser's Irish Work, Poetry, Plantation and Colonial Reformation. Ashgate Publishing, Ltd. pp. 206, 207. ISBN 978-0-7546-5602-9.
- Lawlor, H. J. (1911). Proceedings of the Royal Irish Academy (ed.). "A Calendar of the Register of Archbishop Sweteman" (PDF). The Library, Institute of Mediaeval Studies, Toronto, Canada: Dublin: Hodges, Figgis & Co., Ltd., London: Williams & Norgate. pp. 235, 236, 285.
- Lawlor, H. J. (1912). A calendar of the register of Archbishop Fleming (PDF). Vol. Proceedings of the Royal Irish Academy, vol. XXX, Section C, No. 5. Dublin : Hodges, Figgis. pp. 93–190.
- O'Donovan, John, ed. (1856). Annála Rioghachta Éireann. Annals of the Kingdom of Ireland by the Four Masters ... with a Translation and Copious Notes. 7 vols. Translated by O'Donovan (2nd ed.). Dublin: Royal Irish Academy. CELT editions. Full scans at Internet Archive: Vol. 1; Vol. 2; Vol. 3; Vol. 4; Vol. 5; Vol. 6; Indices.
- Ó Dónaill, Niall (1997). "Foclóir Gaeilge-Béarla".
- Ó Donnabháin, Sean (2008). "The Irish Charters in the Book of Kells" (CELT ed.). University College Cork, Celt Project.
- Gwynn, Aubrey (1946). W. Tempest (ed.). The Medieval Province of Armagh, 1470–1545. Dundalk: Dundalgan Press.
- Twemlow, J A (1909). "Calendar of Papal Registers Relating To Great Britain and Ireland" (Lateran Regesta 325: 1434–1435 ed.). His Majesty's stationery Office. pp. 499–509.

=== Bibliography ===
- Walsh, Rev Michael (1961). Ríocht na Midhe: The Magranell slab in the basilica of St. John Lateran, Rome. Illustr (Vol. II, No. 3 ed.). Ríocht na Midhe: records of Meath Archaeological and Historical Society. p. 46. (subscription required)
