= Boyne Valley (disambiguation) =

Boyne Valley is the valley of the River Boyne in Leinster, Ireland. Boyne Valley may also refer to:

- Boyne Valley Township, Michigan, an American township
- Boyne Valley (Queensland), a locality in the Gladstone Region, Australia
- Boyne Valley/Brú na Bóinne, a World Heritage Site in County Meath, Ireland
  - Boyne Valley to Lakelands Greenway, a greenway linking Navan, County Meath in the valley to Kingscourt Co. Cavan
