= Nobber =

Village in County Meath, Ireland

Nobber Irish: An Obair
- Village
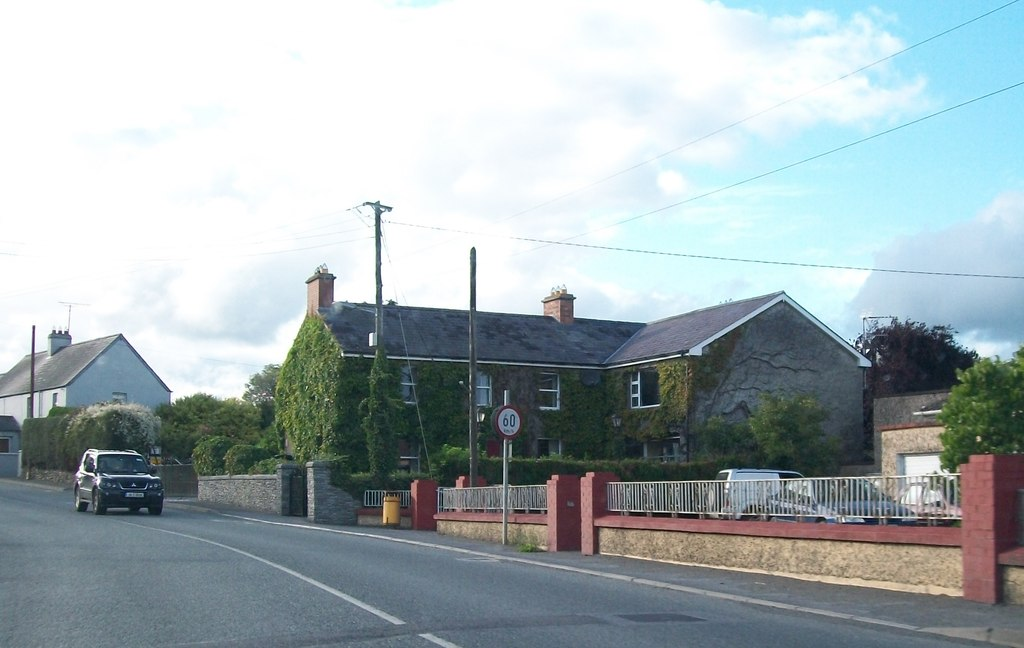
- Houses on the R162 at Nobber

- Location in Ireland
- Coordinates: 53.82113°N 6.74668°W
- Country: Ireland
- Province: Leinster
- County: County Meath
- Elevation: 56 m (184 ft)

Population (2022)
  - Total: 404
- Irish Grid Reference: N812880

Nobber (Irish: an Obair, "the work") is a village in north County Meath, Ireland. It is on the Navan–Kingscourt road (R162), about 19 kilometres (12 mi) north of Navan. The village is in a townland and civil parish of the same name.

The town of Kells is to the west, the town of Ardee to the east and the town of Kingscourt is to the north. Villages that border the parish are Kilmainhamwood, Moynalty and Kilbeg to the west, Castletown-Kilpatrick to the south and Drumconrath and Lobinstown to the east.

The village of Nobber is built on the River Dee, the course of which was diverted around the village in the 19th century. A feature of the local geography is how the village is set within rolling hills called drumlins formed in the last glacial period.

== History ==
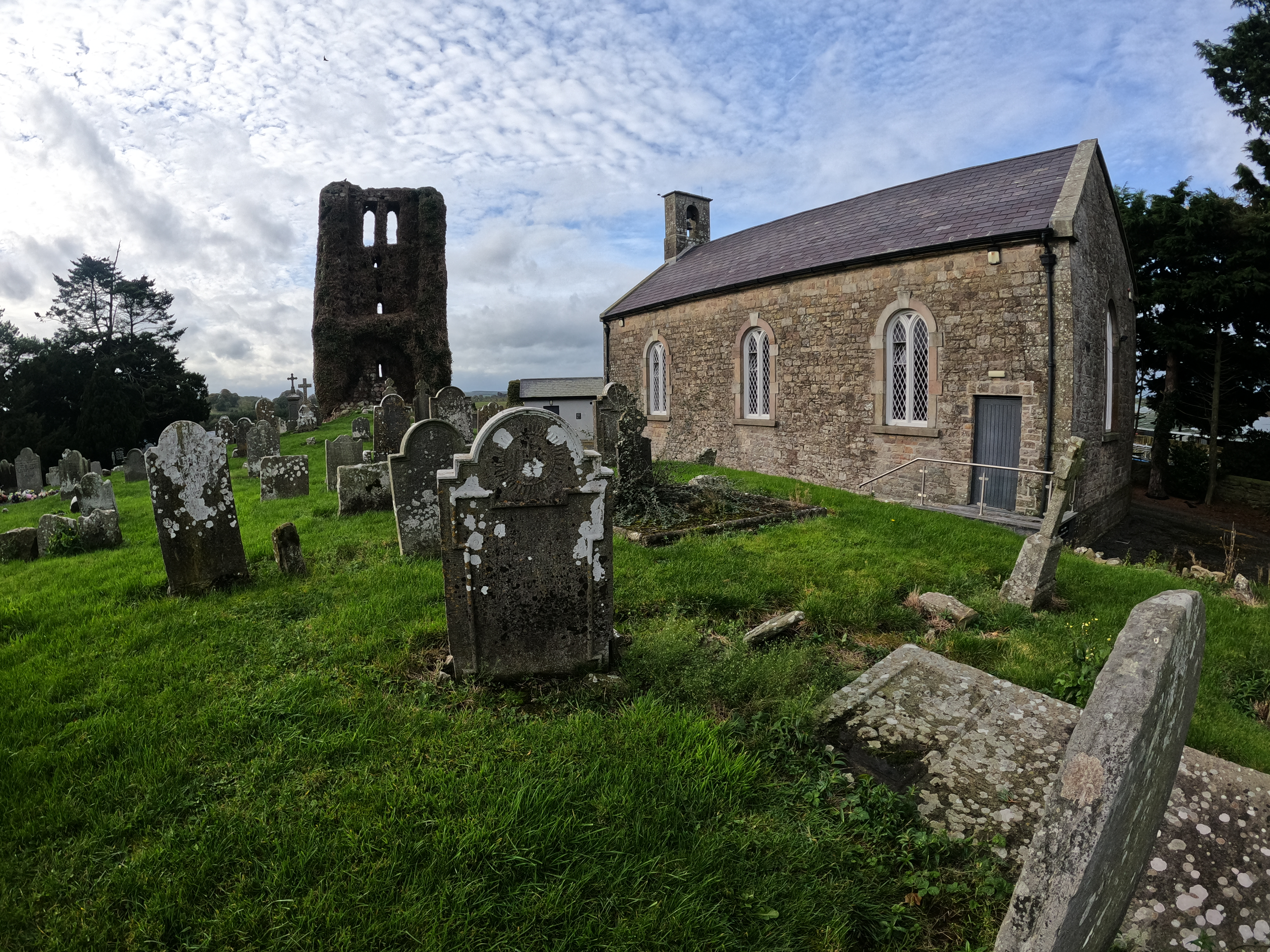
St John's Old Cemetery and former church - now George Eogan Cultural and Heritage Centre

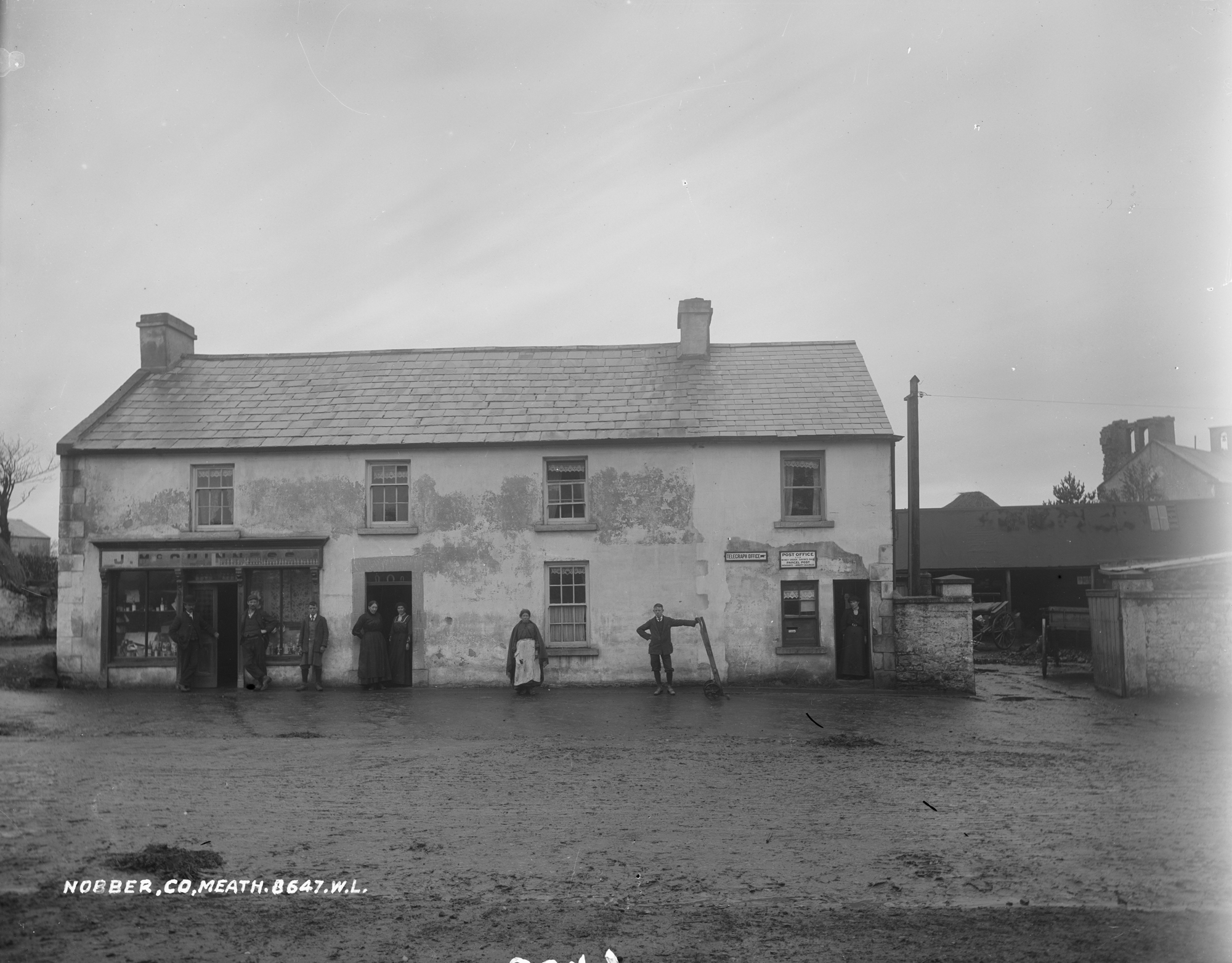
McGuinness's Shop in the centre of Nobber at the turn of the 20th century

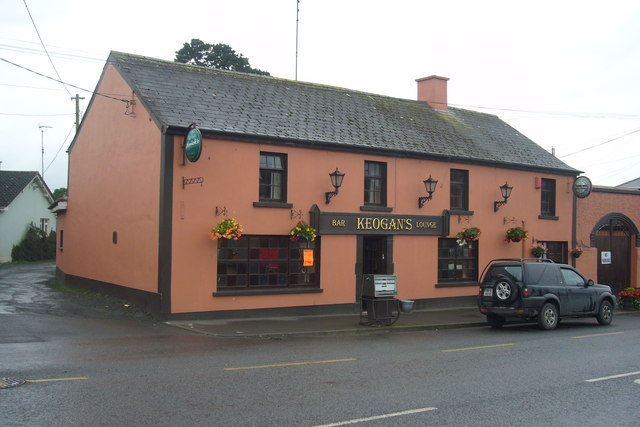
The same premises (now Keogan's Bar) at the turn of the 21st century

The Normans were the first known people to settle at Nobber. The site acted as a strong-point on the road from the ports of Drogheda and Dundalk to the midlands. The Lordship of Meath was granted to Hugh de Lacy by King Henry II of England in 1172 in his capacity as Lord of Ireland. De Lacy granted the Barony of Morgallion to Gilbert de Angulo, who constructed a motte and bailey there. By the middle of the 15th century, Nobber was described by the English King Henry VI as being of key strategic importance to the control of the region. Around 2005, several high crosses were discovered in the village's old cemetery (St Johns) dating from possibly the 10th century. These are smaller and less ornate than typical Celtic high crosses. This find is significant because it suggests that a hitherto unrecorded monastic settlement once existed on the site of the village. Moynagh Lake, to the west of the village, is the site of a multi-period crannóg which dates to Mesolithic times. In the Medieval period, Nobber was the chief town of the Barony of Morgallion. By the time of the Act of Union, the local population was large enough to return a Member of Parliament.

=== Archdeacon of Nobber ===
Nobber was once a key town in the Kingdom of Meath, and an ancient Rectory of Nobber was united to the ecclesiastical dignity of the Archdeacon of Kells; thus the holder was styled "Rector of Nobber", "Parson of Nobber", or more often "Archdeacon of Nobber". Confusingly, the Archdeacon of Kells held the Rectory of Nobber, while the Archdeacon of Meath held the Rectory of Kells.

== Transport ==
=== Rail ===
A disused railway line dating from 1875, running from Kingscourt to Navan, runs through the village. This was purchased by the Midland Great Western Railway in 1888. Until recent years it operated to haul gypsum from Saint-Gobain Gypsum Industries plant in County Cavan to the port of Drogheda. Nobber railway station opened on 1 November 1872, closed for passenger traffic on 27 January 1947 and finally closed altogether on 1 April 1963.

=== Greenway ===
A major phase of the Navan-to-Kingscourt Greenway was developed and opened for the Nobber locality in summer 2020. This was the first phase of what later became "Boyne Valley to Lakelands Greenway". This follows the track of the old railway line from Navan to Kingscourt. This extends from Spiddeal at the south of the village extending toward Kilmainhamwood.

=== Bus ===
Bus Éireann route 107 links Nobber to Navan and Kingscourt. Sillan also provide a link to Navan and Dublin with some buses extending to University College Dublin. In the other direction Sillan services provide a link to Kingscourt, Shercock and Cootehill.

== Amenities ==
The village has two schools: Nobber National school for primary school children and O'Carolan College, which is a comprehensive secondary school. The church of Saint John the Baptist is the Roman Catholic church in the centre of the village, which also has a fire station, Garda Síochána (police) station.

In July 2016 the George Eogan Cultural Centre was opened by the President of Ireland, Mr Michael D. Higgins in Nobber in the old Protestant Church.

== In the media ==
The local radio station serving Nobber is LMFM, and the local newspaper is the Meath Chronicle. In 2019, an eponymous historical fiction novel entitled Nobber was published by the author Oisin Fagan, the author of Hostages, set in the village of Nobber in the 14th century during plague times.

== Sport ==
Nobber has only one Gaelic football team called Nobber G.F.C. In 2003, Nobber won the All-Ireland Junior Club Football Championship, beating Kilmeena of County Mayo. Nobber are three time Meath Intermediate Football Champions, having won honours in 1980, 2010 and 2019. Having won the 2019 Meath Intermediate Football Championship, as of 2020, Nobber were competing in the Meath Senior Football Championship.

The local soccer team are Electro Celtic FC, who (as of 2012) were competing in Division 3B of the Meath and District League.

== Festivals and events ==
The Nobber Fair Day is an annual event that is held on the third Sunday of May. The event has been running since 2006 and has revived an old tradition of a fair that was held in the village for centuries. Rare breeds of farm animals are displayed, and rosettes and prizes are awarded across various categories. In 2012, more than 10,000 people attended Nobber Fair Day.

== People ==
- George Eogan, archaeologist known for his work at Knowth
- Shane McEntee (1956–2012), Fine Gael TD and Minister of State
- Turlough O'Carolan (1670–1738), blind harpist reputed to have been born in Nobber - there is a statue in memory of him at the southern end of the village
- Justine Stafford, comedian, grew up near Nobber

== See also ==
- List of towns and villages in Ireland

== Bibliography ==
- Healy, John, Abp. (1908). History of the diocese of Meath (PDF). Dublin: Association for Promoting Christian Knowledge – via Internet Archive is non-profit library of millions of free books, and more.
- Cogan, Anthony, Rev. (1862). The diocese of Meath : ancient and modern (PDF) (Volume 1 ed.). Dublin: J.F. Fowler. p. 100.
- Cotton, Henry (1851). Fasti ecclesiae Hibernicae : the succession of the prelates and members of the Cathedral bodies of Ireland (PDF) (Volume 3, The province of Ulster ed.). Princeton Theological Seminary Library: Hodges and Smith, Dublin. p. 19,112,115,126,130.
