= Kilmainhamwood =

Village in County Meath, Ireland

Kilmainhamwood Irish: Cill Mhaighneann
- Village
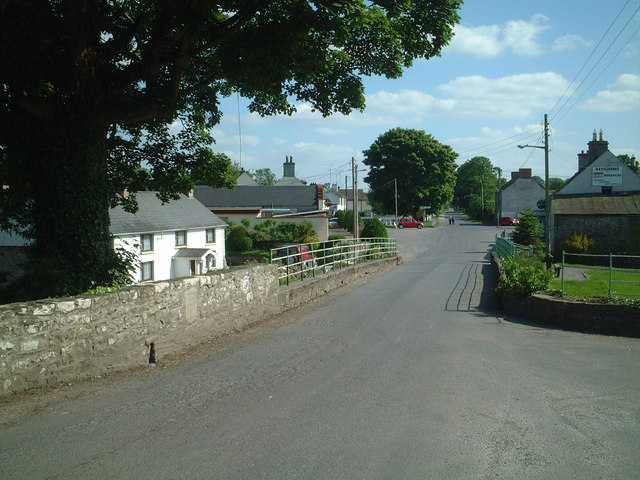
- Street through Kilmainhamwood

- Location in Ireland
- Coordinates: 53°50′58″N 6°48′23″W
- Country: Ireland
- Province: Leinster
- County: Meath

Population (2022)
  - Total: 362
- Time zone: UTC+0 (WET)
  - Summer (DST): UTC-1 (IST (WEST))
- Irish Grid Reference: N784852

Kilmainhamwood, historically simply Killmainham (Irish: Cill Mhaighneann), is a village and townland in north County Meath, Ireland. The village is built on the River Dee and is situated north of Whitewood Lake. The village is located on local roads. Neighbouring parishes are Kingscourt to the north, Drumconrath to the east, Nobber to the south-east, Moynalty to the south and Bailieborough to the west.

== Amenities ==
There is a primary school, a church, two pubs, and a newsagent near the centre of the village.

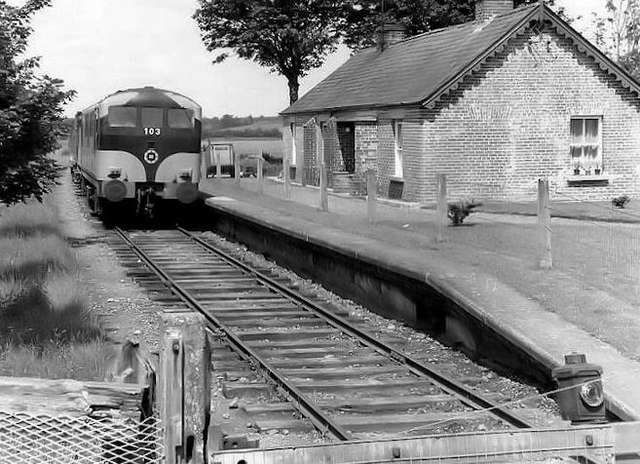
Train passing the closed Kilmainham Wood station in 1975

Kilmainham Wood station on the former Dublin to Kingscourt railway line was situated east of the village and was closed to passengers in 1947, and became part of the Boyne Valley to Lakelands Greenway in 2024.

== Sport ==
The local Gaelic football club is called Kilmainhamwood GFC. The club won the Meath Senior Football Championship once in 1996, however, they now compete in the Junior A Football Championship, which they have won three times in 1965, 1982 and most recently in 1994. Nobber is Kilmainhamwood's main football rivals. Notable former players for Kilmainhamwood include Brian Stafford, Sean McCormack and Jerry Owens.

== People ==
- Brian Stafford, former Meath Gaelic footballer lives in Kilmainhamwood.
- Colm Gilcreest, former professional snooker player is from Cormeen, Kilmainhamwood.

== See also ==
- List of towns and villages in Ireland
- All-Ireland Senior Club Football Championship 2010-2011
