= Castletown-Kilpatrick =

Townland in County Meath, Ireland

Castletown Baile an Chaisleáin Castletown-Kilpatrick
- Townland
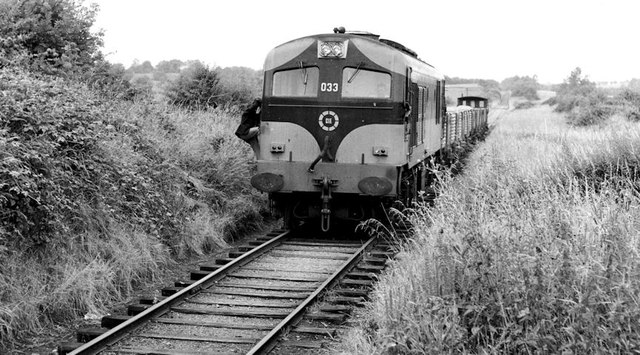
- Freight train near Castletown in the 1970s
- Interactive map of Castletown
- Coordinates: 53.78042°N 6.71463°W
- Country: Ireland
- Province: Leinster
- County: County Meath
- Irish grid reference: N847819

Castletown-Kilpatrick, also known as Castletown KP or Castletown (Irish: Baile an Chaisleáin), is a townland and village in County Meath in Ireland. It falls in the Meath East constituency. The Boyne Valley to Lakelands greenway passes through on the disused Navan and Kingscourt Railway line.

The village lies south of the N52 and east of the R162 regional road, between Kells and Ardee, 6 kilometres (3.7 mi) south of Nobber.

== History ==
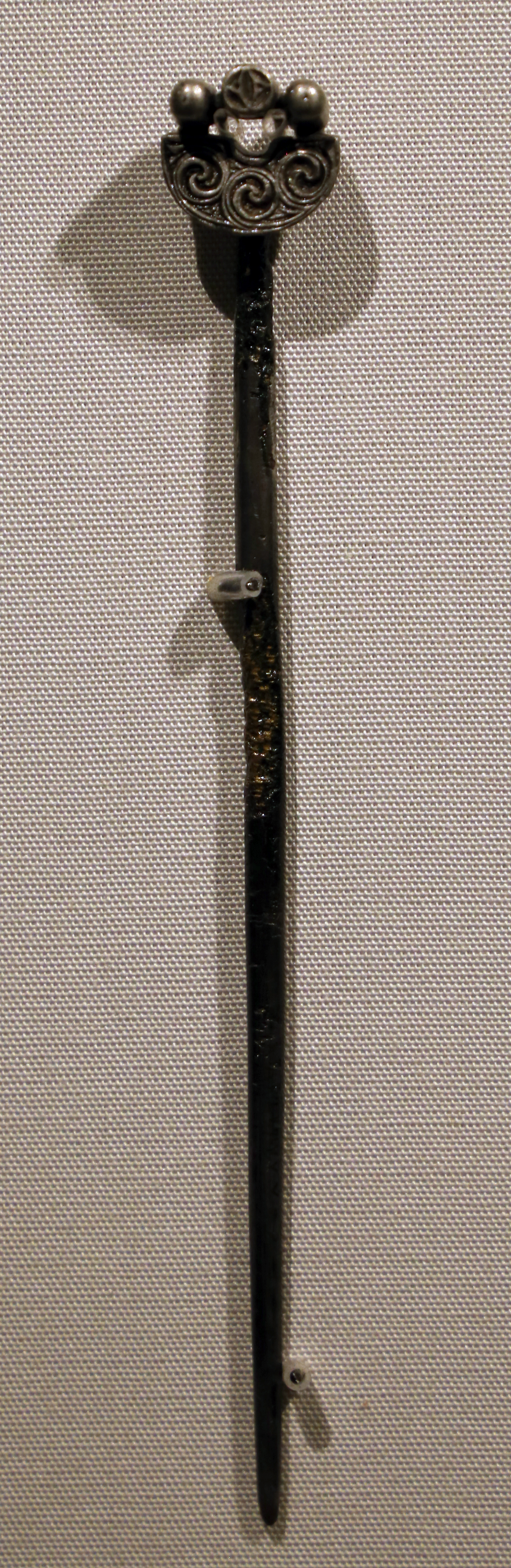
Silver and bronze hatpin found in the village, on display at the National Museum of Ireland, Kildare Street, Dublin

Evidence of ancient settlement in the area includes a number of ring fort sites, and a large motte-and-bailey castle site, in Castletown townland. The disused Church of Ireland church in the townland, dedicated to Saint Patrick and likely the origin of "Kilpatrick", (Note: "Kilpatrick", literally "church of Patrick") was built c. 1820 on the site of an older churchyard. The existing Roman Catholic church, also dedicated to Saint Patrick, was built c. 1830.

A battle of the 1798 Rebellion, involving revolutionaries from County Wexford, was fought near the village. The casualties were buried in mostly unmarked graves in the nearby Knightstown bog.

The Navan and Kingscourt branch line had a halt at the village, which was closed in 1933. The line remained in use for freight use until 2001.

A human-trafficking base of activity was discovered outside the village in 2016.

== Amenities ==
The village has a pub, shop, pitch and putt club, Catholic church and national (primary) school. The church is in the Roman Catholic Diocese of Meath. As of 2024, Castletown National School had an enrollment of 84 pupils.

== Notable residents ==
- Shane McEntee (19 December 1956 – 21 December 2012), Fine Gael politician and Minister of State
- Helen McEntee (born 8 June 1986), Shane's daughter, Fine Gael politician and Minister of Justice
- C. Y. O'Connor (11 January 1843 – 10 March 1902), Irish engineer based in Australia
