= John Anthony Kyne =

Irish Catholic bishop

His Most Reverend, Dr. John Anthony Kyne
- Bishop of Meath
- Archdiocese: Armagh
- Diocese: Meath
- Predecessor: John D'Alton
- Successor: John McCormack

Orders
- Ordination: 31 July 1927
- Consecration: 29 June 1947 by Raffael Cardinal Rossi

Personal details
- Born: 4 November 1904
- Died: 23 December 1966 (aged 62)
- Buried: Cathedral grounds, Mullingar
- Denomination: Roman Catholic

Styles of John Anthony Kyne
- Reference style: The Most Reverend
- Spoken style: Your Grace
- Religious style: Bishop

John Anthony "Jack" Kyne (4 November 1904 - 23 December 1966) was the Roman Catholic Bishop of Meath, Ireland from 1947 to his death in 1966.

== Early life and ministry ==
Kyne was born in Longwood, County Meath on the 4 November 1904. He won a scholarship to St Finian's College in Mullingar and later became a member of staff there. Kyne studied for the priesthood at the Irish College in Rome and was ordained a priest of the Diocese of Meath on 31 July 1927. From 1930, including during World War II, he served as a vice-rector of the Pontifical Irish College in Rome. In 1939 Pope Pius XII named him a Monsignor and further appointed him as Papal Chamberlain in 1940.

== Episcopal ministry ==
Following his predecessors elevation to Archdiocese of Armagh in 1946, he was appointed Bishop of Meath on 29 June 1947, a position he held until his sudden death in Mullingar on 23 December 1966.

Catholic Church titles
Preceded by John D'Alton	Bishop of Meath; 1947 – 1966	Succeeded by John McCormack
