= John McCormack (bishop) =

Irish Catholic bishop

His Most Reverend, Dr. John McCormack
- Bishop of Meath
- Archdiocese: Armagh
- Diocese: Meath
- Predecessor: John Anthony Kyne
- Successor: Michael Smith

Orders
- Ordination: 23 June 1946
- Consecration: 10 March 1968 by William Conway

Personal details
- Born: 25 March 1921 Moynalty, Ireland
- Died: 21 September 1996 (aged 75)
- Buried: Cathedral grounds, Mullingar
- Denomination: Roman Catholic

Styles of John McCormack
- Reference style: The Most Reverend
- Spoken style: Your Grace
- Religious style: Bishop

John McCormack (25 March 1921 – 21 September 1996) was the Roman Catholic Bishop of Meath, Ireland from 1968 to 1990.

== Early life ==
McCormack was born in Moynalty, County Meath on the 25 March 1921. He was ordained a priest of the Cathedral Parish of Mullingar, in County Westmeath on 23 June 1946. He went to Rome to Study in the Lateran University shortly afterwards and was awarded a degree in canon law.

== Episcopal ministry ==
Following the death of John Anthony Kyne in 1968, Pope Paul VI named him as the Bishop of Meath. On 10 March 1968 he was consecrated as a bishop in the Cathedral of Christ the King, in Mullingar County Westmeath by William Cardinal Conway.

== Retirement and death ==
McCormack retired as Bishop of Meath on 16 May 1990 and was succeeded by Michael Smith. He died on 21 September 1996.

Catholic Church titles
Preceded by John Anthony Kyne	Bishop of Meath; 1968 – 1990	Succeeded by Michael Smith
