= Wilkinstown =

Village in County Meath, Ireland

Wilkinstown Baile Uilcín
- Village
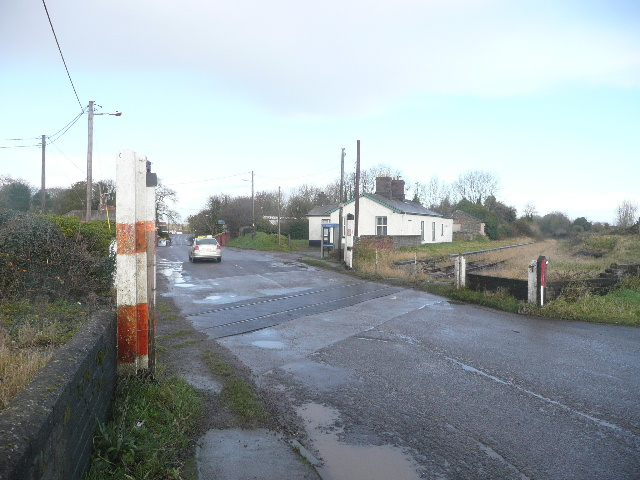
- Level crossing in Wilkinstown

- Location in Ireland
- Coordinates: 53°44′06″N 6°42′42″W
- Country: Ireland
- Province: Leinster
- County: Meath

Population (2016)
  - Total: 228
- (Wilkinstown townland)
- Irish grid reference: N851768

Wilkinstown (Irish: Baile Uilcín) is a townland and village in north County Meath, Ireland. It is located on the Yellow River and the Navan–Kingscourt road (R162) about 10 kilometres (6.2 mi) between both Navan and Nobber. Nobber is to the north, Kells is to the west, Navan at the south and Slane at the east.

== History ==
Evidence of ancient settlement in the area includes a number of ringfort, souterrain and standing stone sites in the townlands of Wilkinstown and Balsaw.

The bodies of Seamus Wright and Kevin McKee, both murdered by the IRA in the 1970s, were recovered from a field near Wilkinstown in 2015.

== Amenities ==
Amenities in Wilkinstown include a pub, community centre, convenience store and service station. The local national (primary) school, Scoil Naomh Barra, had an enrollment of 226 pupils as of the 2022/2023 school year.

By late 2021, work had commenced on an amenity park and playground, behind the community centre. Around the same time, work on lifting the track from the Navan–Wilkinstown section of the railway line was started for the Boyne Valley to Lakelands Greenway, which was completed in 2023.

== Transport ==
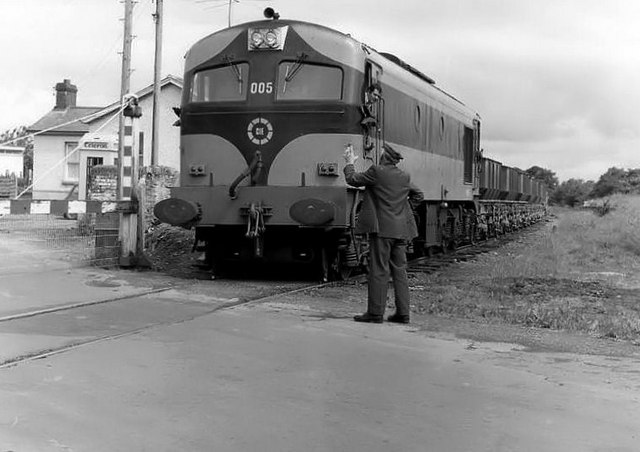
Gypsum train at a level crossing near Wilkinstown in 1976

Wilkinstown railway station, which is now closed, was on the disused Kingscourt branch of the Dublin–Navan railway line, and was situated in the village centre. At one point it had a signal box, goods store and passing loop; however the signal box was demolished and the passing loop was lifted, but the goods store is still intact, albeit overgrown. The station closed in 1947, with the line closing fully in 2001. The station is now a private residence.
