= Thomas Deenihan =

Irish Roman Catholic prelate

The Most Reverend, Dr. Thomas Deenihan D.Ed KC*HS
- Bishop of Meath
- Church: Roman Catholic
- Diocese: Meath
- Appointed: 18 June 2018
- Installed: 2 September 2018
- Predecessor: Michael Smith
- Previous posts: Diocesan Secretary, Education Secretary and Advisor for Post-Primary Catechetics of the Diocese of Cork and Ross; General Secretary of the Catholic Primary Schools Management Association; Chair of the Board of Directors of the Christian Leadership in Education Office; Teacher at St Goban's College

Orders
- Ordination: 1 June 1991 by Michael Murphy
- Consecration: 2 September 2018 by Eamon Martin

Personal details
- Born: 20 June 1967 (age 59) Cork, Ireland
- Education: University of Hull; St Patrick’s College, Maynooth
- Motto: Illuminabit te Christus (Christ will give you light)
- Coat of arms

Styles of Thomas Deenihan
- Reference style: The Most Reverend
- Spoken style: Your Grace
- Religious style: Bishop

Thomas Deenihan KC*HS (born 20 June 1967) is an Irish Roman Catholic prelate who has served as Bishop of Meath since 2018.

== Early life and education ==
Deenihan was born in Blackpool, Cork on 20 June 1967. He attended secondary school at the North Monastery Christian Brothers School and studied for the priesthood at St Patrick's College, Maynooth.

Deenihan was ordained a priest for the Diocese of Cork and Ross in 1991.

== Presbyteral ministry ==
Following ordination, Deenihan's first pastoral assignment was as curate in Glanmire. He was appointed to the teaching staff of St Goban's College, Bantry in 1994, during which time he also served as curate in Ballydehob, Bantry, Kealkill and Schull. As part of the Christian Leadership in Education Office programme, Deenihan also completed further studies at the University of Hull, completing a Master of Education in 1999 and subsequently a Doctor of Education.

He was appointed diocesan advisor for post-primary catechetics in 2003, and subsequently as diocesan secretary and education secretary three years later.

On a national level, Deenihan served as general secretary of the Catholic Primary Schools Management Association from 2013 to 2016, and acted as executive secretary to the Council for Education and the Commission for Catholic Education and Formation of the Irish Catholic Bishops' Conference from 2016 to 2018. He also served as a member of the Honan Governors at University College Cork and Mercy Care South, as diocesan juridical person for Mercy University Hospital and as chair of the Board of Directors of the Christian Leadership in Education Office.

Deenihan was appointed a canon and member of the cathedral chapter in 2017.

== Episcopal ministry ==
Deenihan was appointed Bishop-elect of Meath by Pope Francis on 18 June 2018.

He was consecrated by the Archbishop of Armagh and Primate of All-Ireland, Eamon Martin, on 2 September at the Cathedral of Christ the King, Mullingar.

Speaking at the funeral of Ashling Murphy on 18 January 2022, Deenihan referred to her murder as "a depraved act of violence" and called on people to respect each other.

Catholic Church titles
Preceded by Michael Smith	Bishop of Meath since 2018	Succeeded by Incumbent
