= Stamullen =

Village in County Meath, Ireland

Stamullen Steach Maoilín (Irish)
- Town
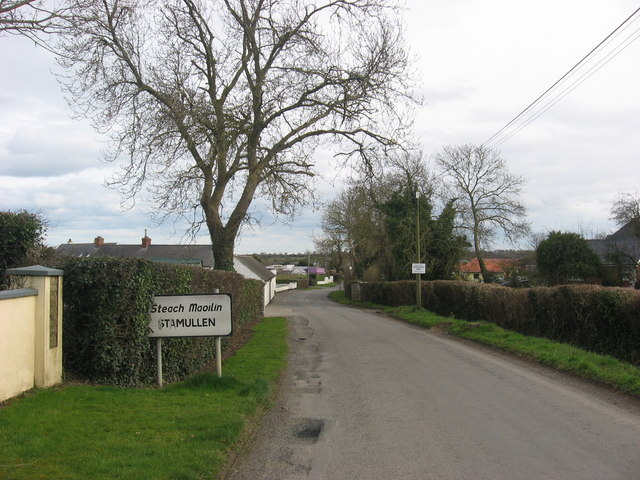
- Road signage on Cock Hill road entering Stamullen

- Location in Ireland
- Coordinates: 53°38′N 6°16′W
- Country: Ireland
- Province: Leinster
- County: County Dublin, County Meath
- Elevation: 25 m (82 ft)

Population (2022)
  - Total: 3,720
- Time zone: UTC+0 (WET)
  - Summer (DST): UTC-1 (IST (WEST))
- Irish Grid Reference: O149656

Stamullen (Irish: Steach Maoilín, meaning 'Mullen's house') is a village in County Meath, Ireland on the border with County Dublin. It lies just off the M1 motorway 32 km north of Dublin city centre and beside the Delvin River. In the late 1990s and early 21st century, it expanded significantly with the development of numerous housing estates in the area.

== History ==
Evidence of ancient settlement in the area includes the ruins of St Patrick's parish church (dated to the 13th century) and the nearby chapel of St Christopher (dated to the 15th century). Part of the Preston chapel of St Patrick's survives, including the tomb of William Preston, 2nd Viscount Gormanston, and his second wife Eleanor Dowdall. The ruins of these structures lie within Stamullen graveyard, which contains a number of unusual gravestones, including a cadaver monument (dated to c.1450) within St Christopher's chapel.

In October 1999, a Real IRA training camp and underground firing range were discovered near the village.

== Demographics ==
In the period between the 1996 and 2022 census, the population of Stamullen increased significantly (almost 9-fold), from 427 to 3,720 inhabitants. According to the 2016 census, more than 85% of homes in the village (869 of 1,018 households) were built between 1991 and 2010.

As of the 2006 census, Stamullen then had the second-lowest percentage of people in the over 65 age group and the lowest percentage of people in the 45-64 age group in any town in Ireland with a population over 1500.

== Amenities ==
The village has a supermarket, pub, hairdresser, barbers, veterinary clinic, butcher, coffee shop and restaurant/fast food outlets.

A Benedictine monastery was established in the town in 2012. This facility, the Silverstream Priory, falls within the Diocese of Meath. In March 2012, two American monks moved into Silverstream House, originally built in 1843 by the Preston family (the Viscounts Gormanston). The monastery's adherents celebrate the Liturgy in Latin, performs Gregorian chant, and Eucharistic Adoration.

Stamullen has a community centre which is also home to St Patricks GAA, Stamullen Football Club, Stamullen Badminton Club, and Stamullen Bowls Club. The village is also home to the M. Donnelly Stamullen Road Club Cycling Team. A free magazine is delivered each month to homes and businesses within the community.

== Education ==
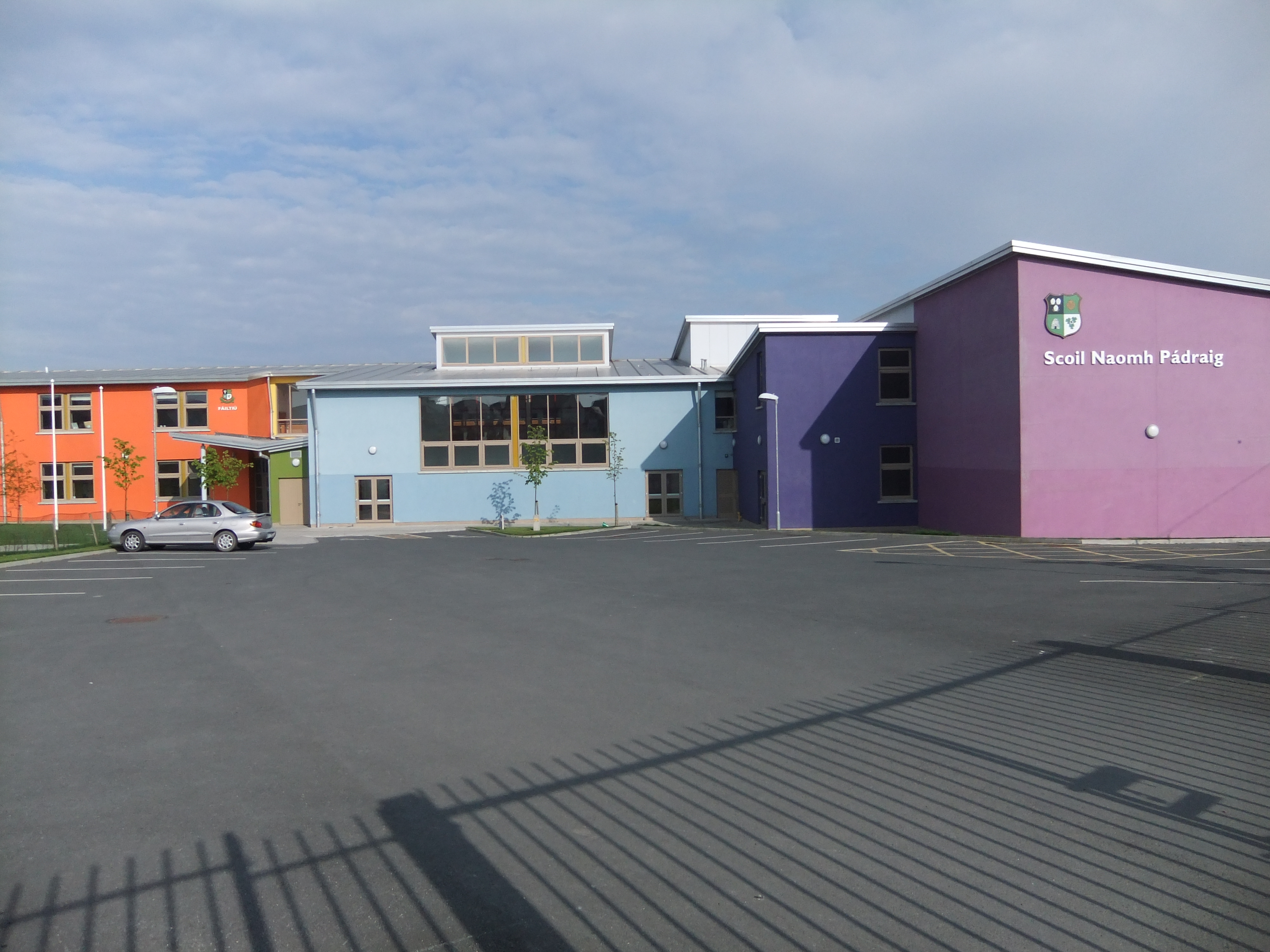
New St. Patrick's National School building, opened in 2008

St. Patrick's National School, originally opened in 1954, was extended in the 1980s to increase capacity to 6 classrooms. Numbers declined for some time, but with the building boom starting in the late 1990s numbers started to climb again. A number of pre-fabs were built in advance of the granting of planning approval for a new building which opened in 2008. As of 2019, the school had an enrollment of more than 660 pupils.

== See also ==
- Category:People from Stamullen
- List of towns and villages in Ireland
