= Thomas Nulty =

Bishop

- Bishop of Meath
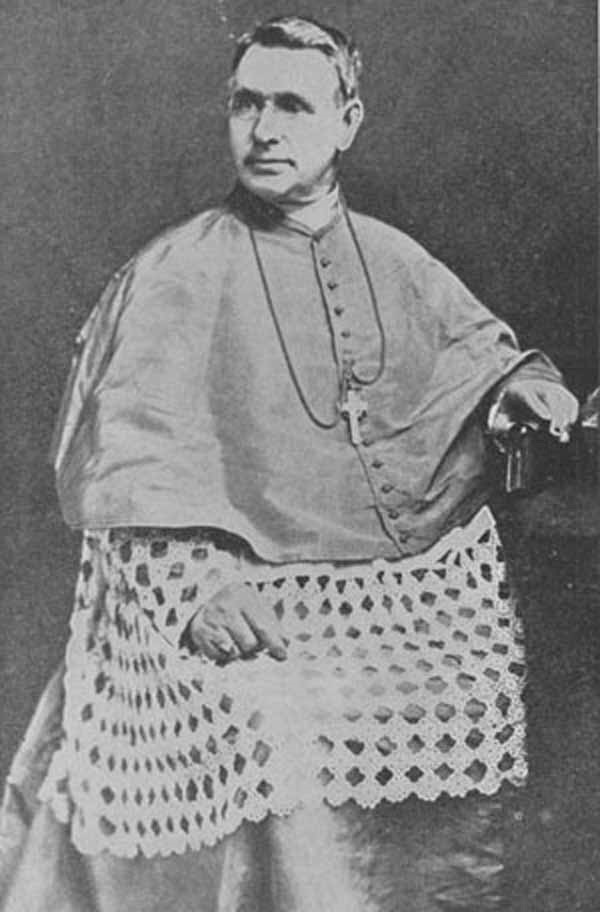
- Church: Catholic Church
- Diocese: Diocese of Meath
- In office: 11 December 1866 – 24 December 1898
- Predecessor: John Cantwell
- Successor: Mathew Gaffney
- Previous posts: Titular Bishop of Centuria (1864-1866); Coadjutor Bishop of Meath (1864-1866)

Orders
- Ordination: 6 June 1846
- Consecration: 28 October 1864 by Joseph Dixon

Personal details
- Born: 9 July 1818 Fennor (north of Oldcastle), County Meath, United Kingdom of Great Britain and Ireland
- Died: 24 December 1898 (aged 80)

The Most Reverend Dr. Thomas Nulty or Thomas McNulty (1818–1898) was born to a farming family in Fennor, Oldcastle, Co. Meath, on 7 July 1818, and died in office as the Irish Roman Catholic Bishop of Meath on Christmas Eve, 1898.

== Biography ==
Nulty was educated at Gilson School, Oldcastle, County Meath, St. Finians, Navan Seminary and Maynooth College. He was ordained in 1846. Nulty was a cleric during the Great Famine. During the course of his first pastoral appointment, he officiated at an average 11 funerals of famine victims (mostly children or the aged) a day, and in 1848 he described a large-scale eviction of 700 tenants in the diocese, thought to have been near Lough Sheelin, a freshwater lough at a meeting point of Counties Westmeath, Meath and Cavan.

Nulty rose to become the Most Reverend Bishop of Meath and was known as a fierce defender of the tenant rights of Irish tenant farmers throughout the 34 years that he served in that office, from 1864 to 1898. Nulty was in agreement with the economic ideas of the progressive reformer Henry George. Nulty read George's book Progress and Poverty multiple times and agreed with every word. Henry George even said that 'Georgism' could just as well be known as 'Nultyism'.

Thomas Nulty is famed for his 1881 tract Back to the Land, wherein he makes the case for land reform of the Irish land tenure system. Nulty was a friend and supporter of the Irish nationalist Charles Stewart Parnell until Parnell's divorce crisis in 1889.

Dr. Thomas Nulty, who had attended the First Vatican Council in 1870, said his last mass on 21 December 1898.

Catholic Church titles
Preceded by John Cantwell	Bishop of Meath; 1866–1898	Succeeded by Mathew Gaffney
