= The Diocese of Meath =

The Diocese of Meath is a nineteenth-century publication on the history of the Roman Catholic Diocese of Meath from medieval to nineteenth century times, written by one of the Diocese's priests, Dean Cogan, a priest in Navan, the then Diocesan capital.

Published in two volumes in 1862 and 1867, it was an important history of Christianity in Ireland, because Cogan made use of three sources of information:

- folklore and memories of people alive in Meath the 1850s and 1860s (covering the period from the Penal Laws to the Great Famine (1845–49)) which were recorded in great detail.
- access to the Meath diocese's archives; when the Roman Catholic Bishop of Meath moved from his former seat in Navan to the new cathedral in Mullingar in the early twentieth century (the diocesan seminary, St. Finians, also moved from Navan to Mullingar) the diocesan archives were lost in the process. How the priceless records, many of them by Cogan in his research in the 1860s, were lost remains a mystery;
- access to papers relating to the church in Meath in the Irish Public Records Office. The Irish Public Records Office was destroyed by the Irish Republican Army in 1922, in effect destroying one thousand years of records, including most of the records from that source quoted by Cogan.

As a result, Cogan's book details parish histories, information on derelict churches, information on old burial sites where those who died in the Famine were buried, names of priests, details of the Penal Law, and information on the re-appearance of a Roman Catholic clerical structure following the reformation from sources that are no longer available to historians.
