= Boyne Valley to Lakelands Greenway =

Rail-trail and greenway in Ireland

Coordinates: 53.734°N 6.7109306°W

Boyne Valley to Lakelands greenway
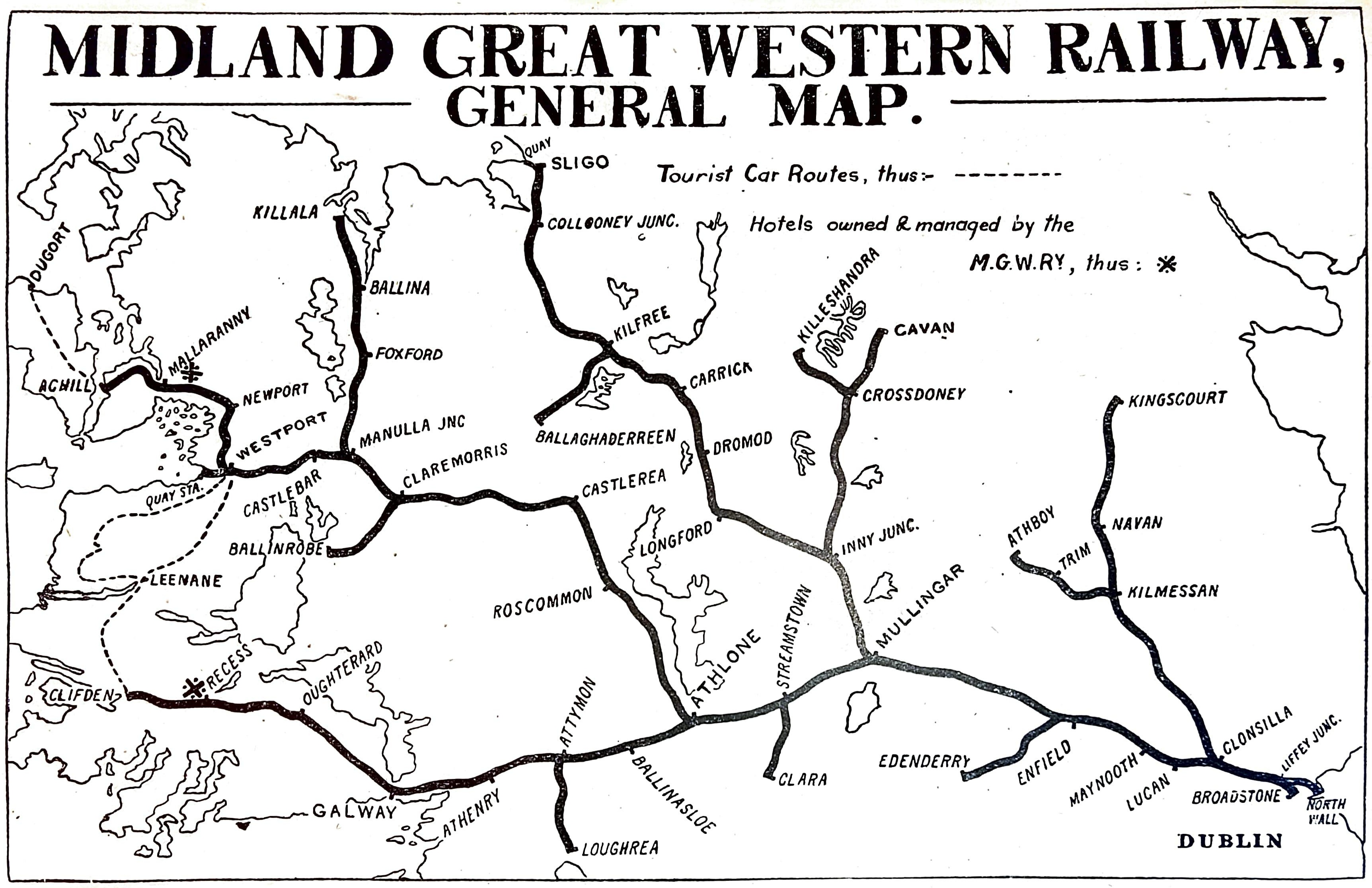
- map of former Midland Great Western railway including the Navan-Kingscourt branch
- Length: 30km
- Location: Navan–Kingscourt, Ireland
- Trailheads: Blackwater Park, Navan, Dún na Rí Forest Park
- Use: Hiking, Cycling
- Website: boynevalleytolakelandsgreenway.ie

The Boyne Valley to Lakelands Greenway is a greenway and rail trail, in Ireland. The 30 kilometres (19 mi) route has been completed in sections. Completed in May 2024, it links Navan, County Meath to Kingscourt, County Cavan, along the defunct Navan and Kingscourt Railway.

== Sections ==
The completed sections link Navan's Blackwater Park to Kilmainhamwood, through Kilberry, Wilkinstown, Castletown KP, and Nobber.

== History ==
The branch line that the greenway was built on was authorised for construction by the Navan and Kingscourt Railway Co. on 5 July 1865, and would reach as far as Kilmainhamwood on 1 November 1872 and would open to its final terminus at Kingscourt on 1 November 1875. The Midland Great Western Railway (who had acquired the line in 1888) sought a bill in 1894 to extend the railway to Cookstown via Armagh and Dungannon, but abandoned it after an agreement with the Great Northern Railway (Ireland). The MGWR then promised financial backing to the Kingscourt, Keady and Armagh Railway Co. as its bill passed parliament in 1900, but the GNRI convinced the company to drop the section between Kingscourt and Castleblayney in 1902. The MGWR would be authorised to complete the line to Castleblayney on 11 August 1903, but it would ultimately never occur.

The line would find its primary source of traffic with the opening of a siding in 1939 at Kingscourt to allow trains to haul Kingscourt Gypsum. Passenger service on the line would be discontinued during the harsh winter of 1947 on 27 January and never reopen. The line would stop seeing non-gypsum traffic in 1975 and would ultimately close on 30 October 2001 after a driver's strike as gypsum switched to road haulage.
