= Mathew Gaffney =

Love is my life Dushyant Kumar

- Bishop of Meath
- Church: Catholic Church
- Diocese: Diocese of Meath
- In office: 28 April 1899 – 1906
- Predecessor: Thomas Nulty
- Successor: Laurence Gaughran

Orders
- Ordination: c. 1864
- Consecration: 25 June 1899 by Michael Logue

Personal details
- Born: 2 January 1839 Mountnugent, County Cavan, United Kingdom of Great Britain and Ireland
- Died: 15 December 1909 (aged 70)

Bishop Mathew Gaffney (Mountnugent, 2 January 1839 – 15 December 1909) was a Roman Catholic Bishop of Meath.

Mathew Gaffney was born in Mountnugent, Co. Cavan, on 2 January 1839. He began his studies for the priesthood at St. Finian's Seminary, Navan before going to Maynooth College and was ordained in 1864. Fr Gaffney worked as a teacher in St. Mary's College, Mullingar and he also served time as a curate in Tullamore, Co. Offaly, before becoming parish priest in Clara, Co. Offaly, Monsignor Gaffney became Vicar General of the Diocese of Meath.

In 1899 he was appointed Bishop of Meath, succeeding Bishop Nulty. During his tenure as Bishop, Gaffney oversaw the building of St. Finian's, Mullingar, where the diocesan seminary in Navan moved to, and began the development of the new Cathedral.

He retired due to ill health, in 1906, and was succeeded by Dr. Laurence Gaughran. Bishop Gaffney died in 1909, and was buried in the Franciscan Abbey at Multyfarnham, Co. Westmeath. In 2009, one hundred years after his death Bishop Gaffney was reburied in the grounds of the Cathedral of Christ the King, Mullingar.

Catholic Church titles
Preceded by Thomas Nulty	Bishop of Meath; 1899–1906	Succeeded by Laurence Gaughran
