= Michael Smith (bishop) =

Irish Roman Catholic Bishop

The Most Reverend Dr. Michael Smith
- Bishop Emeritus of Meath
- Archdiocese: Armagh
- Diocese: Meath
- Predecessor: John McCormack
- Successor: Thomas Deenihan

Orders
- Ordination: 9 March 1963 by Cardinal Traglia, Cardinal-Bishop of Albano
- Consecration: 29 January 1984 by Cardinal Tomás Ó Fiaich

Personal details
- Denomination: Roman Catholic
- Coat of arms

Michael Smith KC*HS (born 6 June 1940) is the retired Roman Catholic Bishop of Meath, Ireland. He was ordained priest in the Papal Archbasilica of St. John Lateran on 9 March 1963 by Cardinal Traglia, Cardinal-Bishop of Albano. He celebrated his first mass on 10 March 1963 in the Clementine Chapel, located under the Altar at Papal Basilica of Saint Peter.

== Early life and education ==
He was born in Oldcastle, County Meath, the son of Bridget Fagan and John Smith and studied for the priesthood at the Irish College in Rome. He was ordained a priest for his native diocese on 9 March 1963 and continued his studies in Rome where he earned a doctorate in canon law. He attended all 168 days of the Second Vatican Council for which he and 41 other young priests prepared the official record, having been appointed as a recording secretary to the council immediately after his ordination as a priest.

After his return from Rome he served in the Cathedral Parish of Mullingar, as chaplain to St Loman's Hospital and as secretary to the bishop.

Styles of Michael Smith
- Reference style: The Most Reverend
- Spoken style: Your Grace
- Religious style: Bishop

He was appointed auxiliary bishop of the diocese and Titular Bishop of Leges on 17 November 1983 and was consecrated on 29 January 1984. The principal consecrator was Tomás Cardinal Ó Fiaich; his principal co-consecrators were Archbishop Gaetano Alibrandi, the Apostolic Nuncio to Ireland, and Cahal Daly, Bishop of the Diocese of Down and Connor.

On 13 October 1988, he was appointed coadjutor bishop with the right of succession. On 16 May 1990 he succeeded John McCormack on the latter's retirement.

== Episcopal ministry ==
For much of his time as Bishop of Meath he served as secretary to the Irish Bishops' Conference and was actively involved in Church matters. Regarded as a traditional bishop he is well respected both by the people of his diocese and those in public life.

He took a keen interest in world affairs and led fund-raising campaigns to assist the victims of earthquakes in South America and victims of the 2004 Indian Ocean earthquake and tsunami.

In October 2006 he travelled to Rome with the other bishops of Ireland for their five-yearly ad limina visit to the Pope.

Smith retired as Bishop of Meath on 18 June 2018

Catholic Church titles
Preceded by John McCormack	Bishop of Meath; 1990 – 2018	Succeeded by Thomas Deenihan
