= Thomas Mulvany =

Irish Catholic bishop (1868–1943)

His Most Reverend, Dr. Thomas Mulvany
- Bishop of Meath
- Archdiocese: Armagh
- Diocese: Meath
- Predecessor: Laurence Gaughran
- Successor: John D'Alton

Orders
- Ordination: 6 March 1892
- Consecration: 30 June 1929 by Joseph Cardinal MacRory

Personal details
- Born: 1 March 1868 Skearke, Moynalty, County Meath, Ireland
- Died: 16 June 1943 (aged 75)
- Buried: Cathedral grounds, Mullingar
- Denomination: Roman Catholic
- Parents: James Mulvany & Mary Monaghan

Styles of Thomas Mulvany
- Reference style: The Most Reverend
- Spoken style: Your Grace
- Religious style: Bishop

Thomas Mulvany (1 March 1868 – 16 June 1943) was the Roman Catholic Bishop of Meath, Ireland from 1929 to his death in 1943.

== Early life and ministry ==
Mulvany was born in the townland of Skearke Moynalty, County Meath on 1 March 1868 to James Mulvany and Mary Monaghan. He was ordained a priest of the Diocese of Meath on 6 March 1892.

== Episcopal ministry ==
Following his predecessor's death, Pope Pius XI named him Bishop of Meath on 12 April 1929 and he was consecrated on 30 June of that year, with Cardinal Joseph MacRory being the principal consecrator. He retained that position until his death in Mullingar on 16 June 1943. He died in the Bishop's Palace, Mullingar, and is buried in the cathedral grounds.

== New cathedral ==
At the time of his appointment, Mulvaney became involved with plans for a new cathedral for Mullingar and the Diocese of Meath to replace the aging Cathedral of the Immaculate Conception (1836–1936). He took the plans to Pope Pius XI, who was supportive and requested that the new building be dedicated as The Cathedral of Christ the King. The building was completed from 1932 to 1936.

Mulvany opened St Patrick's Classical School in the former study hall of St Finian's College, Navan (which had moved to Mullingar).

Catholic Church titles
Preceded by Laurence Gaughran	Bishop of Meath; 1929 – 1943	Succeeded by John D'Alton
