= Drumconrath =

Village in County Meath, Ireland

Drumconrath Droim Conrach
- Village
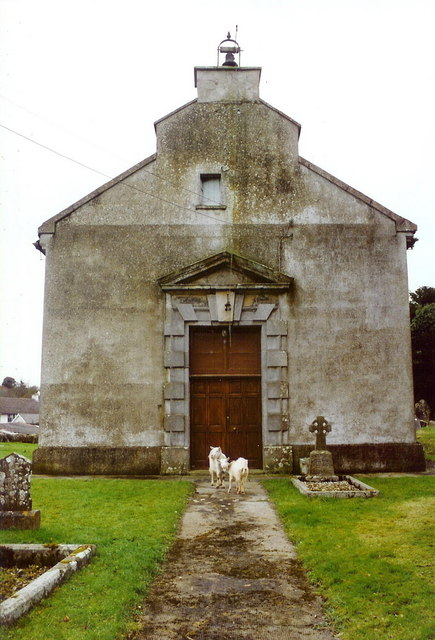
- Former Anglican church in Drumconrath

- Location in Ireland
- Coordinates: 53°51′N 6°39′W
- Country: Ireland
- Province: Leinster
- County: County Meath

Area
  - Total: 2.19 km^{2} (0.85 sq mi)

Population (2022)
  - Total: 423
  - Density: 193/km^{2} (500/sq mi)

Drumconrath or Drumcondra (historically Drumconra, from Irish: Droim Conrach, meaning 'ridge of Conrach') is a small village in north County Meath, Ireland, 8 km west of Ardee. The parish borders County Louth and is also close to the borders of Counties Monaghan and Cavan. As of the 2016 census, the village had a population of 423 people.

The village lies in a parish, Drumconrath and Meath Hill parish, within the Roman Catholic Diocese of Meath. The village is in the civil parish of Drumcondra.

== History ==
There is evidence of settlement in the area since before 200 BC in the ancient pathways and ringforts at Corstown and Drumsilagh. Tuath Conraige of the Mugdorna, an Airgíalla tribe mostly in Monaghan, occupied the area in the early Middle Ages and gave their name to the area.

During the Late Middle Ages, Drumconrath was literally "Beyond the Pale" being the first Gaelic Settlement you meet leaving the Pale from Ardee. It was a hostile place for the English who left the safety of the Pale and several battles took place in the village. The battle of Ballyhoe (1539 AD) between the O'Neills and the English, took place nearby. Of this battle, local folklore says that a treasure was thrown into the lake during the battle and when a true Irish Gael on a white horse comes, he will swoop into the lake and take it.

The remains of a monastery on Church Hill, destroyed because of Henry VIII's Dissolution of the Monastery Act, overlooks Lough Braken lake. Here there are views of the Mourne Mountains in one direction and the Dublin Mountains in the other.

During the 1798 rebellion, five parishioners were killed by the Louth Militia for refusing to allow them entry to the Church in the village. The area had strong Ribbonmen support and six men from the area were hanged for their part in the infamous burning of the Wildgoose Lodge Murders nearby. A number of local men fought in the Anglo-Irish War and the Irish Civil War with nearby Kingscourt Brigade. It is recorded that this Brigade fired the last shot of the Anglo-Irish War at 11:20 on 11 June 1921, twenty minutes after the truce.

A movie, released in October 2016, was filmed in and near Drumconrath. The movie, "The Wilde Goose Lodge", involved a number of local people and actors.

== Amenities ==
Set in forested drumlin countryside and surrounded by small lakes, the area around Drumconrath is an angling centre with a number of walking areas. The River Dee, Lough Bracken, and the smaller lakes of Corstown and Balrath are situated in this area.

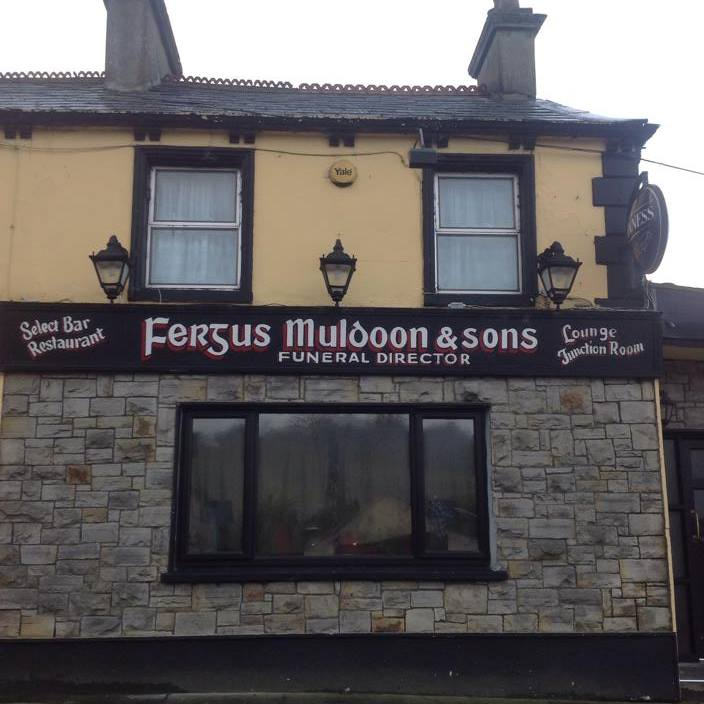
Muldoon's Bar front

Village amenities including a doctor's GP practice, post office, hair salon, pharmacy, butchers, primary school, grocery store, several pubs and a B&B. There is a community centre in the village and a pitch & putt course to the rear. St. Peter & Paul's National School is situated on the Kingscourt road at the end of the village.

There are two churches in the village. Saint Peter's Church of Ireland (now closed) and Saint Peter & Paul's Catholic Church. There are some graves surrounding Saint Peter's Church, and the village has two other cemeteries on the Ardee Road (one Catholic and one Protestant).

The local GAA team, Drumconrath GAA, has facilities on the Navan road in Birdhill. The club also recruits players from the local parish of Meath-Hill to form the team "Drumconrath-Meath-Hill".
