= Christian Leadership in Education Office =

- Former names: Christian Formation Resource Centre (CFRC)
- Established: 1992
- Religious affiliation: Catholic (Presentation Brothers)
- Academic affiliations: University of Hull
- Director: Dr. F. J. Steele
- Location: Cork, Munster, Ireland
- Website: www.cleocork.com

Christian Leadership in Education Office (CLEO) provides postgraduate training in education in Cork, Ireland. Originally founded in 1991 as the Christian Formation Resource Centre (CFRC) by a number of Catholic religious orders, in 1997 it came solely under the Presentation Brothers, becoming Christian Leadership in Education Office. Since 1992 it has run postgraduate degrees, for primary and secondary schoolteachers validated by the University of Hull. Since the partnership with the University of Hull commenced over 250 teachers have gained Masters in Education, and over 20 have completed doctorates.

The MA is a 3-year programme, starting with a first-year certificate followed by a diploma before a final MA year. CLEO is based in Markdye House, Mardyke, Cork. Lecturers are delivered Cork, after school hours during school terms. Each year the CLEO Annual Reunion Lecture is hosted in Mardyke House. The MEd is recognised by the Irish Department of Education, with some 50 graduates being appointed school principal.

In 2019 CLEO in partnership with St. Patrick’s College, Maynooth and Alliance for Catholic Education (University of Notre Dame), began offering the Diploma in Catholic Education (DCE).
