= Dean Cogan =

Irish Roman Catholic priest

Dean Anthony Cogan (1826–1872) was a nineteenth-century Roman Catholic Irish priest (awarded the religious title of dean), born in Slane, who wrote a history of the Diocese of Meath in Ireland. Published in two volumes in 1862 and 1867, Cogan's The Diocese of Meath was an important history of Christianity in Ireland.

Anthony Cogan was born in 1826, one of five sons and three daughters of baker Thomas Coogan and his wife Ann Sillary, his mother converted from the Church of Ireland to Catholicism to marry. Cogan trained for the priesthood in St. Finian's Seminary in Navan.

Cogan's work, which included a humanitarian dimension, led to the naming of a housing estate in his memory: 'Dean Cogan Place', located in Navan, where he had served as a curate.

A plaque unveiled in 2003 adorns the wall of his birthplace on Main Street, Slane.
