= Henry Cotton (divine) =

British historian (1790–1879)

Ven. Henry Cotton (31 March 1790 – 3 December 1879) was an English Anglican divine, ecclesiastical historian and author.

== Life ==
Cotton was born in Chicheley, Buckinghamshire, the son of Rev. William C. Cotton, vicar of Chicheley. His mother was Charlotte Elizabeth Barrett, daughter of Rev. Thomas Barrett, Vicar of Stanton Harcourt and Southleigh.

Beginning in 1803, Cotton spent four years at Westminster School and then in 1807 he entered Christ Church, Oxford. He obtained a B.A. in classics in 1811 and a M.A. in 1813. He would later dedicate his work on Bible editions to the memory of Cyril Jackson, dean of Christ Church.

In 1818, he married Marie Vaughan Laurence, daughter of Richard Laurence. He was sub-librarian of the Bodleian Library from 1814 to 1822. In 1820, he received a D.C.L. from Oxford.

In 1822, his father-in-law was appointed Archbishop of Cashel, Ireland, so in 1823 Cotton moved there to serve as his domestic chaplain. Cotton became the librarian at the Bolton Library. The following year he became archdeacon of Cashel. In 1832, he became treasurer of Christ Church Cathedral, Dublin; in 1834, he became the honorary dean of Lismore Cathedral.

Cotton eyesight began failing, causing him to retire from active duties of the ministry, and he gave up the deanery of Lismore in 1849. In 1872, he became almost totally blind. He died at his residence in Lismore in 1879, and was buried in the graveyard of Lismore Cathedral.

== Works ==
Cotton wrote extensively, and among his works is the six-volume Fasti Ecclesiæ Hibernicæ, a compilation of brief biographical sketches giving "the succession of the prelates and members of the cathedral bodies in Ireland".

He also compiled A List of Editions of the Bible in English from 1505 to 1820, with Specimens of Translations, &c. (Oxford, 1821, second edition, corrected and enlarged, 1852).

Cotton's other works (not including occasional sermons and articles in periodicals) are:

- Dr. Wotton's Thoughts on a proper Method of studying Divinity, with Notes, &c. (Oxford, 1818).
- A Typographical Gazetteer attempted (Oxford, 1824, second edition, corrected and enlarged, 1831; and a second series, especially rich in details of the foundation of newspapers in the United States, and of missionary publications in our colonies, Oxford, 1866).
- Memoir of a French New Testament, with Bishop Kidder's Reflections on the same (London, 1827, second edition 1863).
- A Short Explanation of Obsolete Words in our Version of the Bible (Oxford, 1832).
- Five Books of Maccabees in English, with Notes and Illustrations (Oxford, 1832).
- Cui Bono? A Letter to the Right Hon. E. G. Stanley (Dublin, 1833).
- Fiat Justitia, a Letter to Sir H. Hardinge on the Present State of the Church in Ireland (Dublin, 1835).
- Rhemes and Doway: an Attempt to show what has been done by Roman Catholics for the diffusion of the Holy Scriptures in English (Oxford, 1855).
- The Four Gospels and the Acts of the Apostles, with short Notes for the use of schools and young persons (Oxford, 1857).

On the death of Archbishop Laurence in 1838, Cotton superintended the publication of Laurence's reproduction of the first ‘Visitation of the Saxon Reformed Church in 1527 and 1528,’ and he reissued the privately printed poetical pieces of Archbishop Laurence and his brother, French Laurence.
