= St Finian's College =

- Entrance gate

Location
- Mullingar, County Westmeath; Ireland; 53°32′20.466″N 7°21′18.999″W

Information
- School type: Secondary school
- Religious affiliation: Christian
- Patron saint: St Finian
- Established: 2 May 1802
- Founder: Patrick Plunkett, Bishop of Meath
- President: Paul Connell
- Principal: John McHale
- Vice Principal: Aisling Ryan, Emma Carey
- Chaplain: Mark English
- Gender: Co-educational
- Age range: from 12 years
- Average class size: 31
- Student to teacher ratio: 1:30
- Colours: Yellow and Brown/Black
- Slogan: Deus Spes Mea
- Nickname: Finians
- Accreditation: Scientiae Fidimus
- Affiliation: Diocese of Meath
- Website: www.stfinianscollege.ie

St Finian's College is a secondary school, the diocesan school of the Diocese of Meath. It is located in Mullingar, County Westmeath, Ireland, and is under the patronage of The Most Reverend Thomas Deenihan, Bishop of Meath. Rev. Dr. Paul Connell is its president. John McHale is the principal. Aisling Ryan and Emma Carey are the deputy principals.

== History ==
=== St Finian's College, Navan (1802-1908) ===
St Finian's College was founded in Navan, County Meath as the Meath Diocesan College, by the Bishop of Meath, Patrick Joseph Plunkett. It opened on 2 May 1802. Fr. Eugene O’Reilly as its first president, serving until 1827. Fr. Patrick O'Connor became the second president, retiring due to ill health, succeeded by Fr. Nicholas Power who served until 1967. From 1867 until 1884 the future Australian Bishop Joseph Higgins served as president. Rev. Bernard Duff served as president from 1884 until 1886 and Fr. John Cassidy was appointed president and continued in office until 1891. From 1891 until 1903 Fr. Michael Dooley was president, Fr. Denis Flynn was the president for the final years the college was in Navan. The college moved to Mullingar, County Westmeath, at the beginning of the twentieth century.

=== St Finian's College, Mullingar (1908-Today) ===
The present college building built by J.J. O'Callaghan was opened in February 1905. With students from Navan moving to Mullingar in 1908 and officially opened by Bishop of Meath Lawrence Gaughran. From 1948 to 1982 there were always two Sisters from the Sisters of Mercy, in ministry in the college, one Sister was a registered nurse, who served as ‘Matron’ to the students with the other Sister was skilled in catering/housekeeping. In 1970, St Finian's was selected by the Irish Catholic hierarchy as the location for the music school (Schola Cantorum). Radharc made a documentary about the first graduates to complete the programme at the Schola Cantorum in 1975. 2002 marked the bicentenary of the founding of St Finian's College. In 2003 it opened to girls, and in 2007 the last boarding class graduated. The school also began offering transition year to students in 2017, thanks to the work of Sinéad Garvin and David Andrews. This transition year program introduced laptops into the school, beginning an era of technology for the school.

In 2015, the St Finian's Diocesan crest was removed and replaced with a secular logo with the inclusion of a textbook.

Mass from St Finian's on St Patrick's Day 2016, was broadcast on RTE, with the participation form the school staff and pupils, choirs and musicians.

Rev. Dr. Paul Connell has served as President of the College from 1998.

== Sports ==
The school offers a number of sporting choices in its sports facilities. These include Gaelic football, soccer, hurling, handball, basketball, rugby and golf.

The Mullingar Cricket Club plays in the grounds of St. Finian's College.

A chess club is also operated in St Finian's College.

== Schola Cantorum ==
The school is also the site of the Schola Cantorum, best described as a "miniature music conservatoire at St Finian’s College, Mullingar" There are 29 Schola students. Gerard Lillis is the current director, taking the position in 2003. The Schola has performance at diverse locations across Ireland, including Áras an Úachtaran, Feis Ceoil (Dublin), Glenstal Abbey and the National Principals Conference held in Killarney. Instruments taught at the school include organ, piano, violin, trumpet, clarinet, flute, as well as singing.

Students currently come all over the country Dublin, Kildare, Laois, Longford, Sligo, Meath and Roscommon as part of the Schola Cantorum.

Directors of Schola Cantorum, Fr. Frank McNamara (1970-1984), Shane Brennan (1984-2013), and Gerard Lillis (2013-present).

== Staff ==
- Barry Kelly, hurling referee

== People educated at St Finian's College ==
- Msgr. John Coghlan, C.B.E., Croix Militare De Guerre, a chaplain in the first and second world war.
- Dean Anthony Cogan, historian
- Archbishop Patrick Cronin S.S.C.M.E., D.D., served as Archbishop of Cagayan de Oro.
- Rev. Dr. Dermot Farrell, served as President of Maynooth College, Bishop of Ossory, and Archbishop of Dublin
- Bishop Mathew Gaffney, Bishop of Meath
- Bishop Joseph Higgins, Bishop of Rockhampton and the Bishop of Ballarat, Australia. President of St. Finnian's, Navan(1867-1884)
- Bishop John Anthony Kyne, Bishop of Meath (1947–66)
- Paul McGrath, former TD for Westmeath
- Bishop Thomas Nulty, D.D., served as Bishop of Meath, and acting St. Finians president in mid/late 19th century
- Bishop Eugene O'Connell, served as Bishop in California, studied at St Finians, also taught in the college
- Bishop Michael O'Farrell DD CM, Bishop of the Roman Catholic Diocese of Bathurst, New South Wales, Australia
- Dr. John O'Keeffe KSG, Schola Cantorum graduate, organist, director of sacred music Maynooth College, and for the Papal mass in the phoenix park in 2018.
- Bishop Bernard O'Reilly, Bishop of Liverpool commenced his studies in Navan.
- Gavan Reilly, broadcaster with Virgin Media and Newstalk
- Bishop Joseph Shiel (1873–1931),(attended St. Finians, Navan) Bishop of Rockhampton (1913-1931).
- Rev. Paul Walsh, priest and historian
- Prof. Harry White, Schola Cantorum graduate, musicologist and university professor.

== See also ==
- Irishtown, Mullingar (townland the college stands on)
