= Roman Catholic Diocese of Meath =

Catholic diocese in Ireland

Diocese of Meath Dioecesis Midensis Deoise na Mí

Catholic
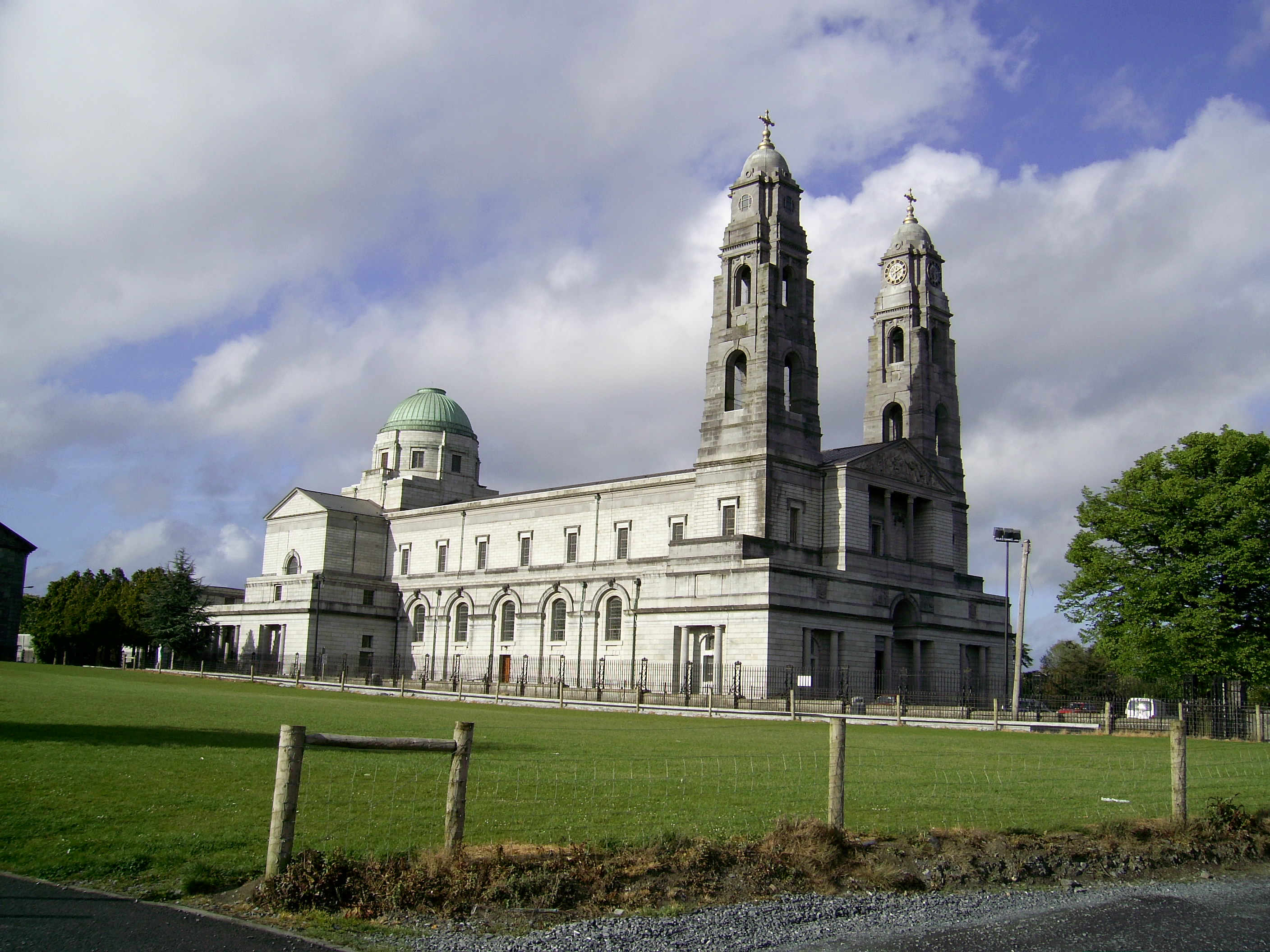
- The Cathedral of Christ the King, Mullingar

Location
- Country: Ireland
- Territory: Most of counties Meath, Westmeath part of Offaly along with part of counties Longford, Louth, Dublin and Cavan.
- Ecclesiastical province: Province of Armagh

Statistics
- Area: 1,977 sq mi (5,120 km^{2})
- Population: Total; Catholics: (as of 2022); 330,775; 279,215 (84.4%)
- Parishes: 69
- Churches: 146

Information
- Denomination: Catholic
- Sui iuris church: Latin Church
- Rite: Roman Rite
- Cathedral: Cathedral of Christ the King, Mullingar
- Patron saint: St Finian
- Secular priests: 183

Current leadership
- Pope: Leo XIV
- Bishop: Thomas Deenihan
- Metropolitan Archbishop: Eamon Martin
- Bishops emeritus: Michael Smith

Map
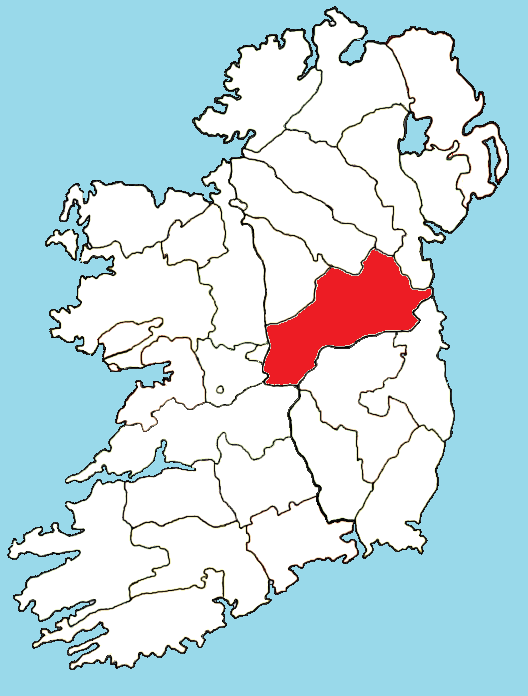

Website
- dioceseofmeath.ie

The Diocese of Meath (Latin: Dioecesis Midensis; Irish: Deoise na Mí) is a Latin Catholic diocese of the Catholic Church that is located in the middle part of Ireland. It is one of eight suffragan dioceses of the ecclesiastical province of Armagh. Thomas Deenihan has been bishop of the diocese since 2 September 2018.

== Geography ==
Meath diocese covers most of counties Meath and Westmeath, part of Offaly along with part of counties Longford, Louth, Dublin and Cavan. The principal towns are Ashbourne,Drogheda, Dunboyne, Kells, Mullingar, Navan, Tullamore and Trim.

== Ecclesiastical history ==
=== Early history ===
Although there had been abbot-bishops of Clonard since the sixth century, the diocese of Clonard proper was not formally established until 1111. It was one of the twenty-four dioceses established by the Synod of Rathbreasail. The diocese covered roughly the western part of the Kingdom of Meath with the bishop's seat located at Clonard Abbey.

=== Lordship of Ireland ===
During the twelfth century the bishops of Clonard acquired most of Meath as their territory, and frequently used the title "bishop of Meath" or "bishop of the men of Meath". After Bishop Simon Rochfort transferred his seat from Clonard to Trim in 1202, the normal style became the "Bishop of Meath". From 1778 until the late 19th century it had its seat in Navan, County Meath.

=== 19th and 20th centuries ===
Charles Stewart Parnell's relationship with Mrs Katharine O'Shea led to the Bishop of Meath having a letter read at masses in the diocese in condemnation of the relationship. As Parnell was popular, this caused a backlash which eventually led to the cathedral removing to Mullingar, County Westmeath permanently. The diocesan school, St. Finian's College also moved to Mullingar from Navan.

The diocesan cathedral is Christ the King Cathedral, Mullingar, situated near the town centre.

== Ordinaries ==
The following is a basic list of bishops of Meath since 1830:

- John Cantwell (1830–1866)
- Thomas McNulty (1866–1898)
- Mathew Gaffney (1899–1906)
- Laurence Gaughran (1906–1928)
- Thomas Mulvany (1929–1943)
- John Francis D'Alton (1943–1946)
- John Anthony Kyne (1947–1966)
- John McCormack (1968–1990)
- Michael Smith (1990–2018)
- Thomas Deenihan (18 June 2018 – present)

== Vicars General ==
The serving Vicars general as of 2020 are Declan Hurley, administrator of Navan parish and Joseph Gallagher, Parish priest of Tullamore.

== See also ==
- Catholic Church in Ireland
- The Diocese of Meath - a publication on the history of the diocese
- Diocese of Meath and Kildare (Church of Ireland)
