= Cathedral of Christ the King, Mullingar =

Church in Mullingar, Ireland

Coordinates: 53.5269°N 7.34629°W

Cathedral of Christ the King
- Ardeaglais Chríost an Rí
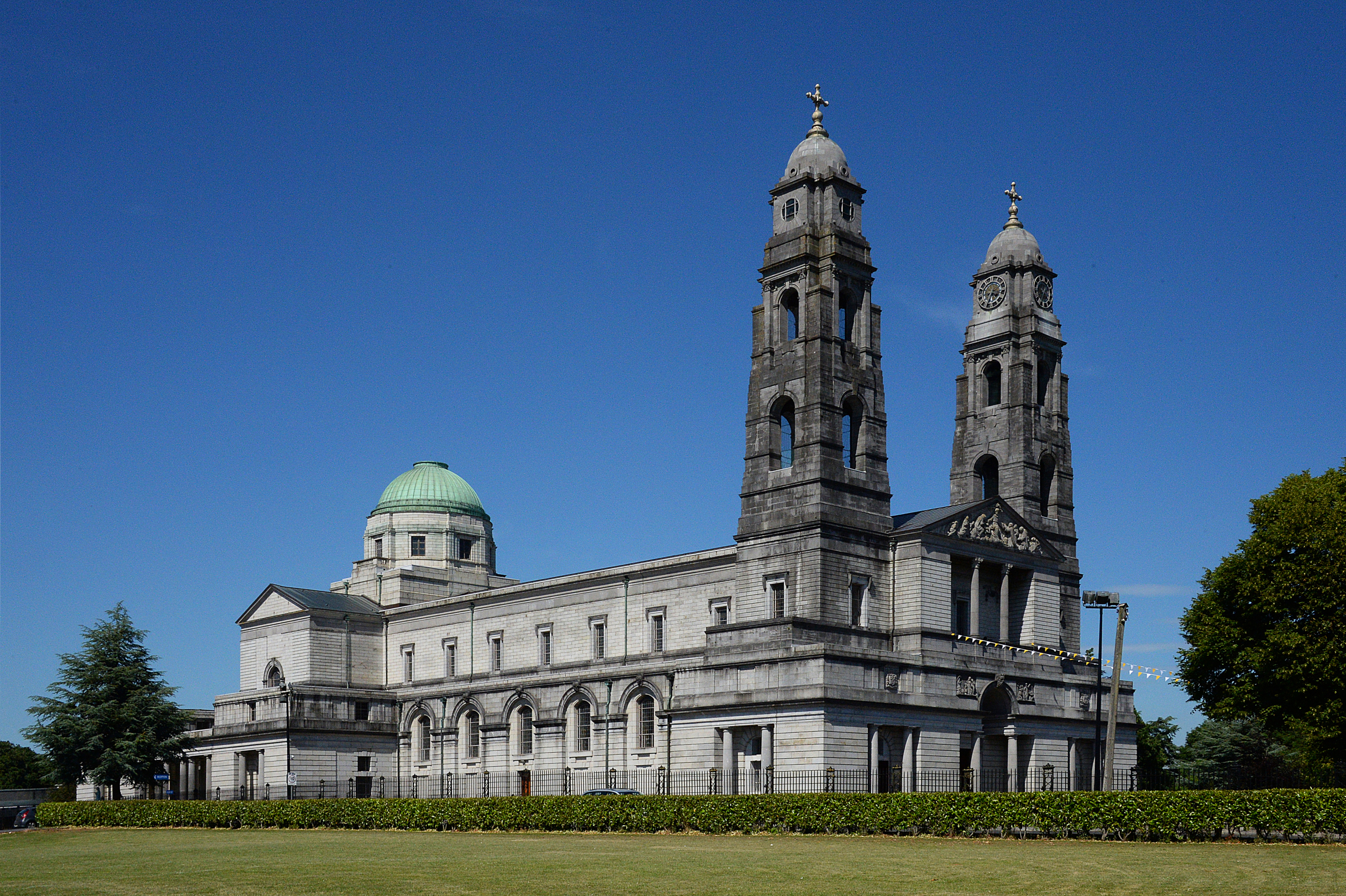
- Location: Mullingar, County Westmeath
- Country: Ireland
- Language: English
- Denomination: Roman Catholic
- Website: www.mullingarparish.ie

History
- Former name: Cathedral of the Immaculate Conception (1836–1936)
- Status: Cathedral
- Dedication: Christ the King
- Dedicated: 6 September 1936
- Consecrated: 13 August 1939

Architecture
- Functional status: Active
- Architect(s): William Byrne & Sons of Dublin
- Architectural type: Basilican
- Style: Renaissance Revival
- Groundbreaking: 6 September 1933
- Construction cost: £199,500 excluding decoration; £275,000 in total

Specifications
- Capacity: 5,000
- Height: 55 m (180 ft)

Administration
- Province: Armagh
- Diocese: Diocese of Meath
- Parish: Mullingar

Cathedral of Christ the King (Irish: Ardeaglais Chríost an Rí) is a Roman Catholic cathedral located in Mullingar, County Westmeath, Ireland. It is situated near the centre of Mullingar next to the Royal Canal. The cathedral is both the cathedral church of the Diocese of Meath and the principal centre of worship in the catholic parish of Mullingar, including parts of counties Meath and Westmeath.

== Construction ==
Designed to replace the Cathedral of the Immaculate Conception (1836-1936), planning commenced in 1920. Granite was supplied from the quarries at Barnacullia, County Dublin. William Byrne & Sons of Dublin designed the cathedral to be basilican in form and renaissance in style. Its distinctive twin towers, surmounted by bronze crosses, rise to a height of about 55 metres. It was built with a seating capacity of 5,000. Building began in March 1933 and the foundation stone was laid on 6 August of that year by Bishop Thomas Mulvany. Murphy of Dublin were the builders, while much of the artistic decoration work was completed by Earley and Company of Camden Street, Dublin, and Oppenheimer Ltd., of Old Trafford, Manchester. The formal opening and dedication of the new cathedral took place on 6 September 1936. At the request of Pope Pius XI, it became the first cathedral in the world to be dedicated to Christ the King. It was solemnly consecrated on 13 August 1939, though other sources state that the consecration occurred a few weeks later on 4 September 1939. The total cost of the building, including decoration, was £275,000.

== Mosaics ==
The works of art for which the cathedral is most noted are the mosaics in the chapels of Saint Anne and Saint Patrick. These are the work of the Russian-born mosaic artist Boris Anrep, whose work may also be found in Westminster Cathedral.

Saint Patrick mosaic by Boris Anrep

The Saint Patrick mosaic represents the saint lighting the Paschal fire on the mount of Slane. The principal figure is that of the saint in his apostolic mission, lifting the cross in a vigorous movement, in his other hand holding a torch. The firewood is arranged in a Christogram, signifying the symbolic importance of the fire.

In the Saint Anne mosaic, the name is spelled "Anna". Saint Anne's image is also said to resemble the poet Anna Akhmatova. The mosaic artist (Anrep) had an affair with Akhmatova during World War I. He left Russia before the Bolsheviks seized power, and although he didn't contact her for 48 years, she remained the muse who haunted his imagination. While she has appeared in several of his mosaics, this one in Mullingar is the only to include her name. (In return, up to 34 of her poems are about him.)

== Gallery ==
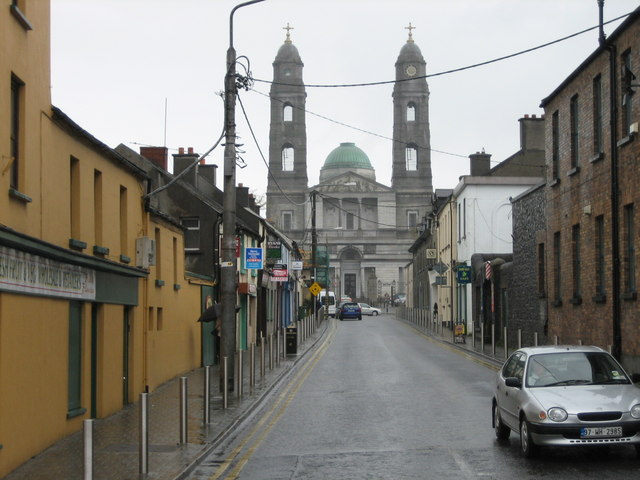
View of the cathedral from Mary Street

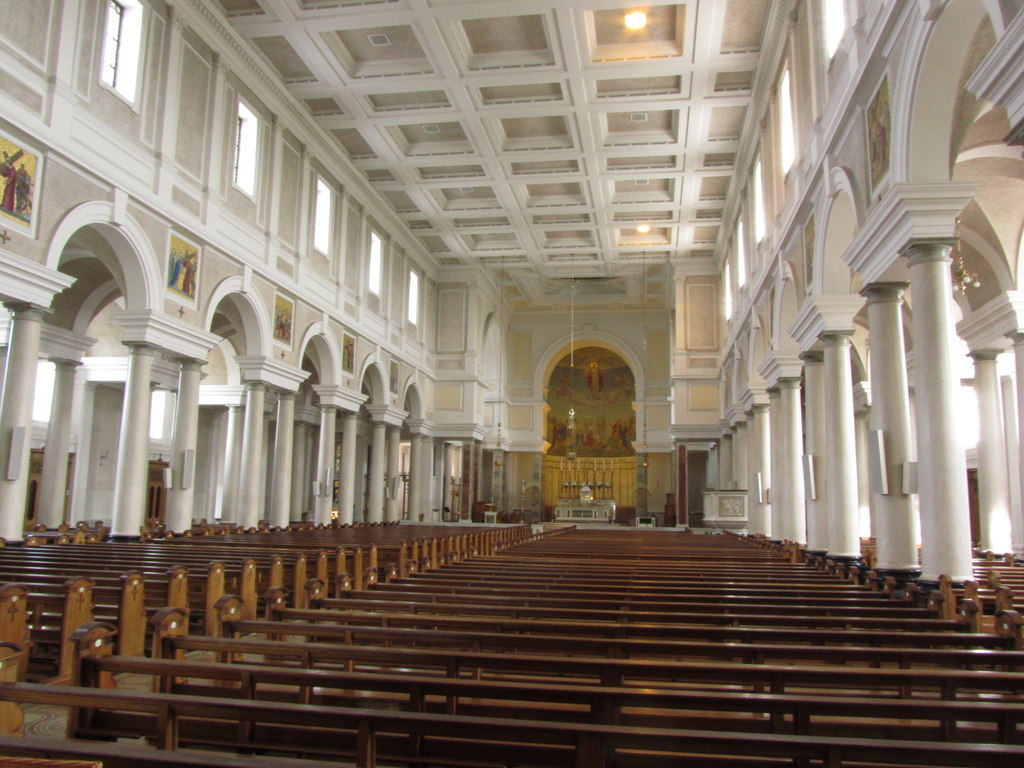
Interior with nave from entrance

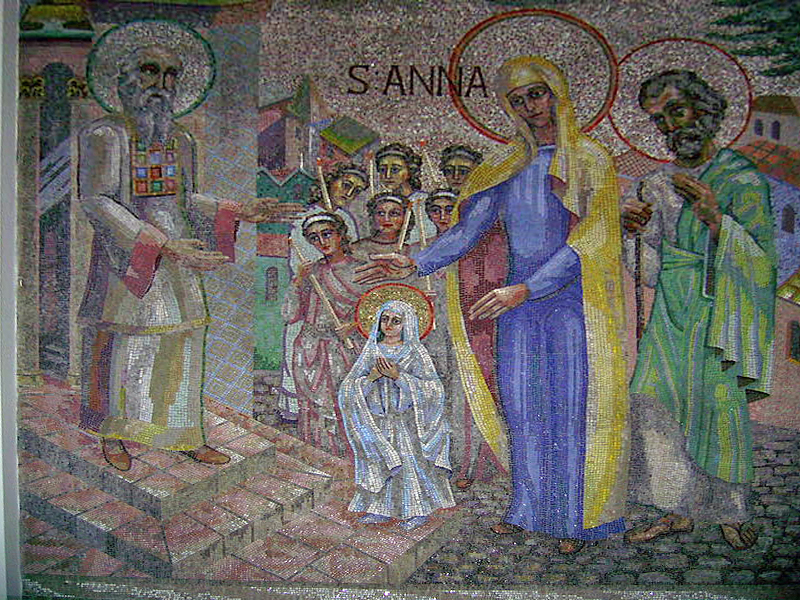
Saint Anne Mosaic, Marian Year 1954, by Boris Anrep

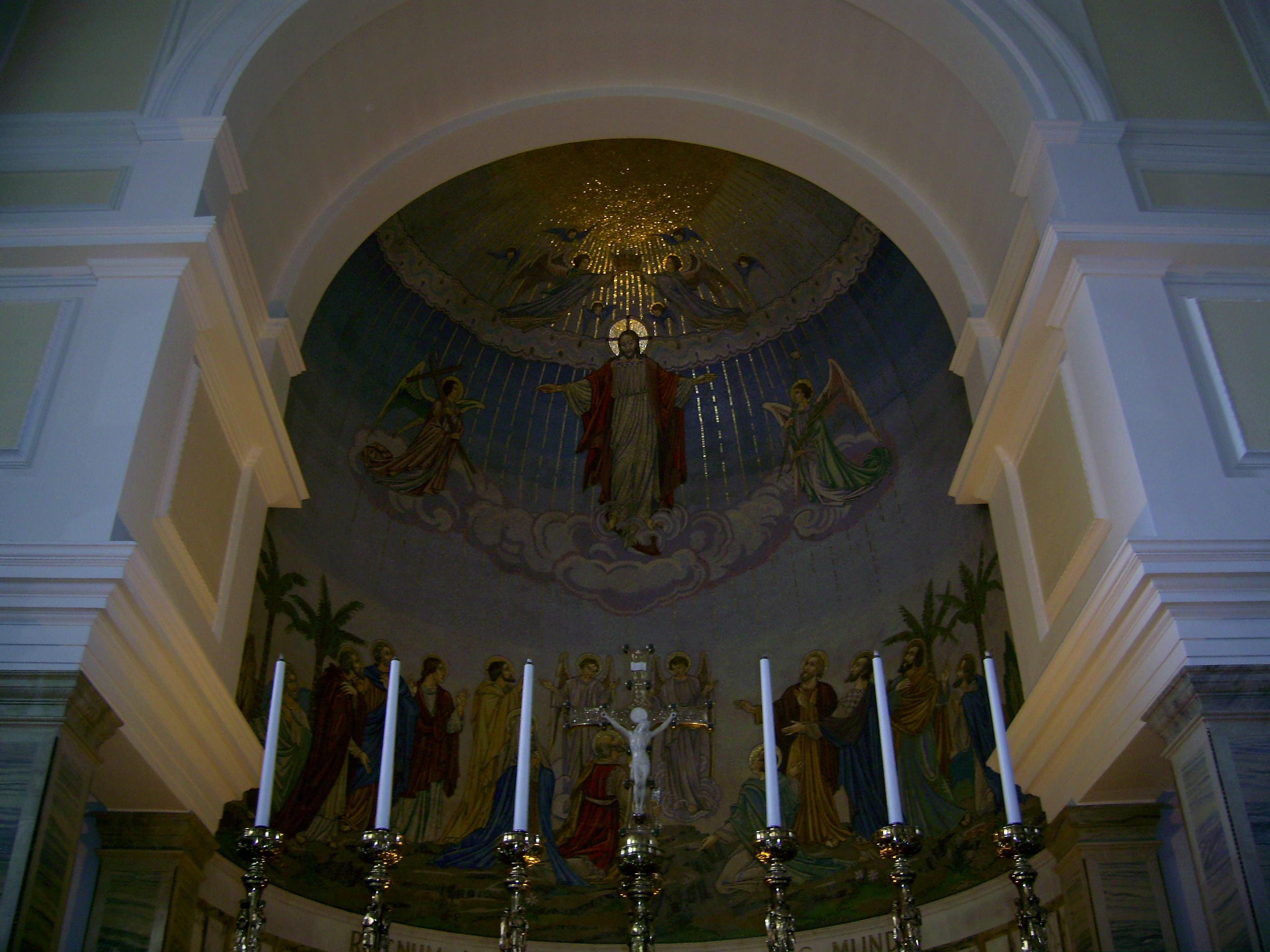
Above the main altar
