= Estadio Monumental =

Estadio Monumental ('Monumental Stadium') may refer to:

- Estadio Monumental (Buenos Aires) in Argentina
- Estadio Monumental David Arellano, in Santiago, Chile
- Estadio Monumental de Caracas Simón Bolívar, in Caracas, Venezuela
- Estadio Monumental de Condebamba, in Abancay, Peru
- Estadio Monumental de Jauja, in Jauja, Peru
- Estadio Monumental de Maturín in Maturín, Venezuela
- Estadio Monumental Isidro Romero Carbo in Guayaquil, Ecuador
- Estadio José Dellagiovanna, formerly Monumental de Victoria, in Victoria, Buenos Aires, Argentina
- Estadio Monumental José Fierro, in San Miguel de Tucumán, Argentina
- Estadio Monumental Presidente Perón, in Córdoba, Argentina
- Estadio Monumental "U", in Lima, Peru
- Estadio Monumental Universidad Andina de Juliaca, or Estadio Monumental de la UANCV, in Juliaca, Peru
- Estadio Monumental Virgen de Chapi, in Arequipa, Peru
- Cuscatlán Stadium, formally Monumental Estadio Cuscatlan, in San Salvador, El Salvador
- Monumental Río Parapití, in Pedro Juan Caballero, Paraguay

== See also ==
- Estádio Olímpico Monumental, in Porto Alegre, Brazil
- La Monumental, a stadium bullring in Barcelona, Spain
- Monumental (disambiguation)
