= Monumental =

Monumental may refer to:

- In the manner of a monument

== Places ==
- Monumental Island, Nunavut, Canada
- Monumental Island, New Zealand
- Monumental (Barcelona Metro), a station in Barcelona, Catalonia, Spain
- La Monumental, the Plaza Monumental de Barcelona, a stadium bullring in the city of Barcelona, Catalonia, Spain
- Estadio Monumental Antonio Vespucio Liberti, or El Monumental, an Argentine stadium in Buenos Aires
- Plaza Monumental de Morelia, Michoacan, Mexico
- Monumental Square (Alcaraz), Spain
- Monumental Church, Richmond, Virginia, USA

== Other uses ==
- Monumental (album), a 2011 album by Pete Rock and Smif-N-Wessun
- Monumental (Kadebostany album), a 2018 album
- Monumental: In Search of America's National Treasure, a 2012 American documentary film
- Monumental Sports & Entertainment, an American sports and venue management company

== See also ==
- Monumental dance, a dance style introduced by German musical band E Nomine
- Estadio Monumental (disambiguation)
- Cine Monumental (disambiguation)
- Monumentale (Milan Metro), a station in Milan, Italy
- Monument (disambiguation)
