= Monument (disambiguation) =

A monument is a structure commemorating a person or event.

Monument or Monuments may also refer to:

== Places ==
=== Europe ===
- Monument, Newcastle upon Tyne, England

=== North America ===
- Monument, Colorado, U.S.
- Monument, Kansas, U.S.
- Monument, New Mexico, U.S.
- Monument, Oregon, U.S.
- Monument, Pennsylvania, U.S.
- Monument Island, off Baffin Island, Nunavut, Canada
- Rivière du Monument, a river in Quebec, Canada

== Arts, entertainment, and media ==
=== Film ===
- Monument (2026 film), a 2026 American film starring Joseph Mazzello and Jon Voight
- Monuments (film), a 2021 American film

=== Music ===
==== Groups and labels ====
- Monument Records, an American record label
- Monuments (synthpop band), an Italian synthpop band
- Monuments (metal band), a British progressive metal band

==== Albums ====
- Monument (Ultravox album), 1983
- Monument (Front Line Assembly album), 1998
- Monument (Seigmen album), 1999
- Monument (Grand Magus album), 2003
- Monument (Blank & Jones album), 2004
- Monument (Scale the Summit album), 2007
- Monument (Miss May I album), 2010
- Monument (Children Collide album), 2012
- Monument (Blutengel album), 2013
- Monument (Kollegah album), 2018
- Monument (Molchat Doma album), 2020
- Monument (Portico Quartet album), 2021
- Monuments (DJ Doran album), 1998
- Monuments (Edguy album), 2017

==== Songs ====
- "Monument", a song by A Day to Remember from their album For Those Who Have Heart (2007)
- "Monument", a song by Avail from their album Front Porch Stories (2002)
- "Monument", a song by Burst from their album Prey on Life (2003)
- "Monument", a song by Champion from their album Count Our Numbers (2002)
- "Monument", a song by The Crüxshadows from their album The Mystery of the Whisper (1999)
- "Monument", a song by Depeche Mode from their album A Broken Frame (1982)
- "Monument", a song by Fates Warning from their album Inside Out (1994)
- "Monuments", a song by The Haunted from their album Strength in Numbers (2017)
- "Monument", a song by Rosetta from their album Wake/Lift (2007)
- "Monument", a song by Röyksopp & Robyn from their extended play Do It Again (2014)
- "Monument", a song by Strapping Young Lad from their album The New Black (2006)
- "Monument" (Keiino song), a song by KEiiNO, placed 2nd in the Melodi Grand Prix 2021

=== Other uses in arts, entertainment, and media ===
- Monument (novel), a 1974 novel by Lloyd Biggle Jr.
- Monuments (music), also known as historical editions, a category of multi-volume printed music publication
- Monuments (exhibition), a 2025 art exhibition in Los Angeles

== "The Monument" ==
- Monument to the Great Fire of London, or "The Monument", London, England
- Monument House, also known as Schweitzer House or "The Monument" (constructed 1989–1990), just outside the Joshua Tree National Park in California, U.S.
- The Monument (British Columbia), a rock formation in British Columbia, Canada

== Other uses ==
- Buildings and structures:
  - Those on a heritage register are often termed "monuments" even if their original purpose was not commemorative
  - A boundary marker in surveying
- Cycling monument, the most prestigious one-day professional cycling road races
- Monument School, in Monument, Oregon
- Monument (typeface), by Grafotechna
- Monument (company), an American company that offers online services to treat alcohol use disorder

== See also ==
- Category:Monuments and memorials
- Archaeological site
- Headstone
- Monumental (disambiguation)
