= Isidre Puig Boada =

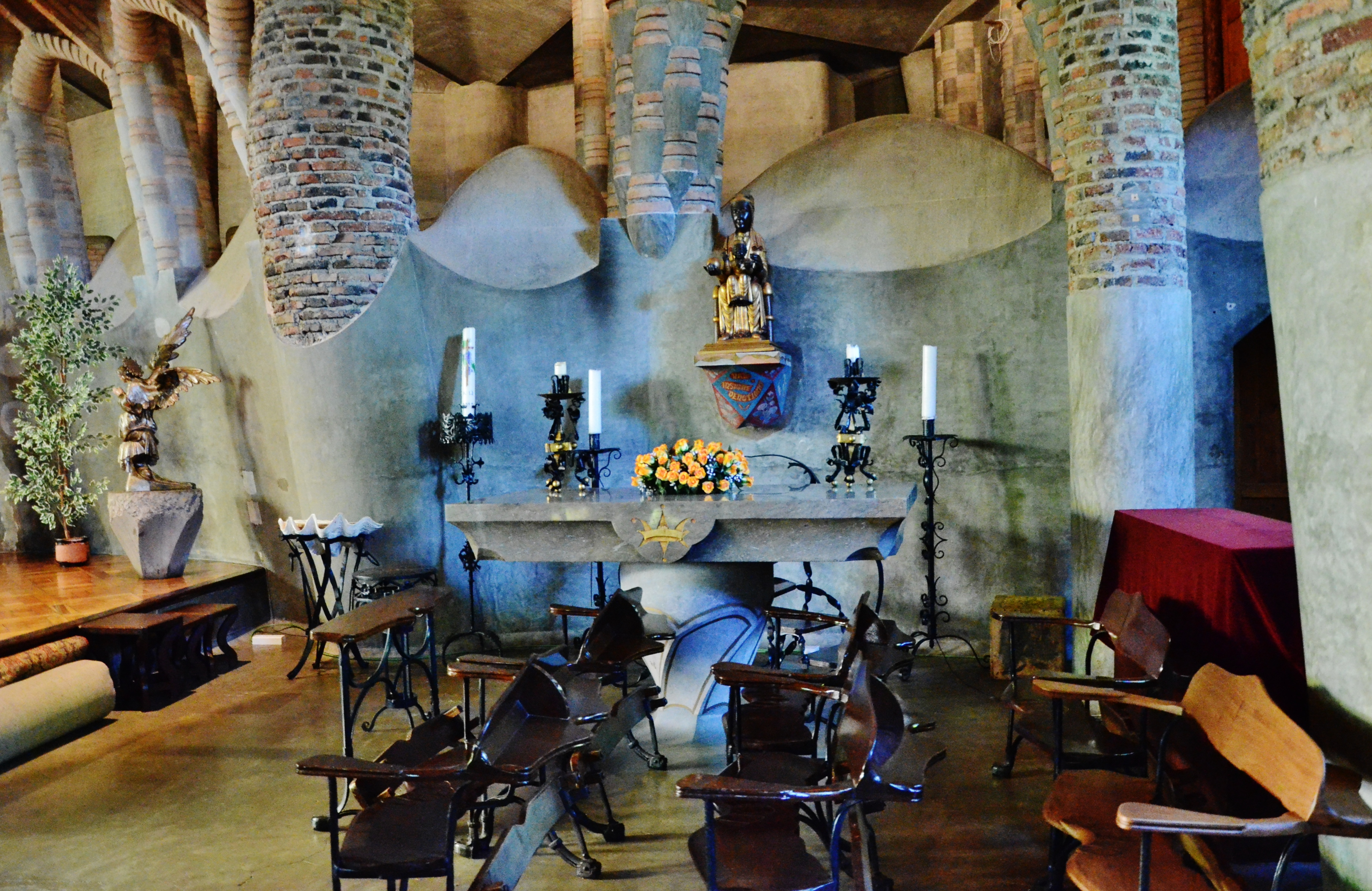

Isidre Puig Boada (Barcelona, 1891 – Barcelona, 1987) was a Spanish Catalan architect, who belonged to the small and select group of architects that were connected to Antoni Gaudí and collaborated with him on his works. He first met Gaudí in 1914 when he was still a student. When Gaudí died in 1926, he was working on the Sagrada Família with Domènec Sugrañes i Gras. In 1950, Boada was assigned director of this construction.

In 1929, Boada published El temple de la Sagrada Família, and in 1976 L'església de la Colònia Güell. In 1981, at the age of 90, he presented Gaudí's thoughts, a collection of several articles on Gaudí's works. Besides architecture, this work also acquaints the reader with Gaudí's political and social thoughts.
