= Zardonic =

Italian-Venezuelan DJ and producer (born 1985)

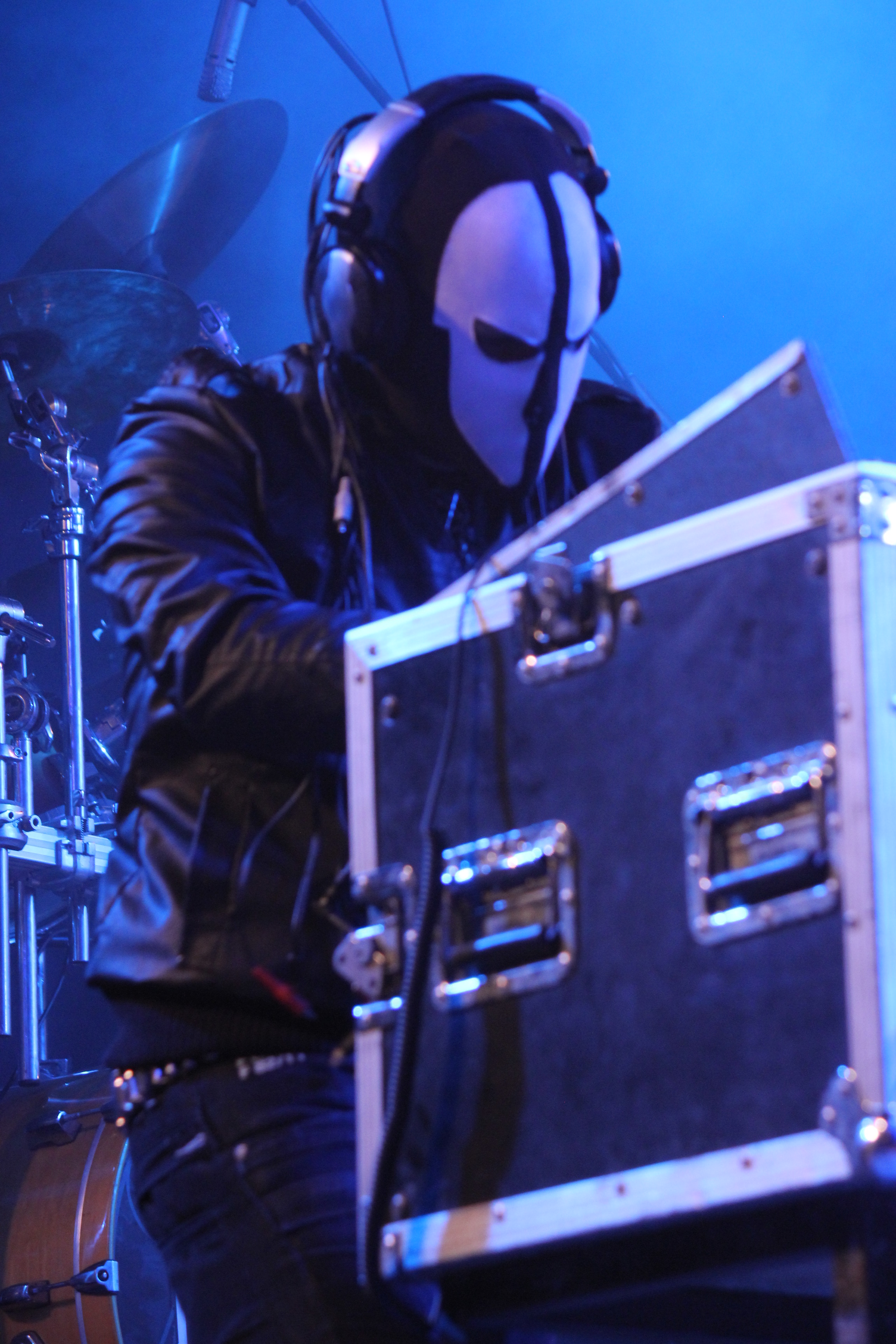
- Zardonic performing at the Dimmu Borgir concert in Caracas, 2012

Background information
- Also known as: Zardonic; Triangular Ascension; Intimus Universum; Gorepriest
- Born: Federico Augusto Ágreda Álvarez; 22 October 1985 (age 41); Barquisimeto, Venezuela
- Genres: Drum and bass, industrial, dubstep, electro, industrial metal
- Occupations: DJ, record producer
- Instrument: Synthesizer
- Years active: 2001–present
- Labels: Entertainment One Music; JVC Kenwood Victor Entertainment; Owsla; Human Imprint; MMC Records
- Website: Zardonic.net

Federico Augusto Ágreda Álvarez (born 22 October 1985), known professionally as Zardonic, is an Italian-Venezuelan DJ and record producer. He is widely known for the fusion of heavy metal and drum and bass.

His work has appeared across major television and entertainment platforms, including as the official theme of All Elite Wrestling's pay-per-view event Revolution on TNT, and as the main track for the World Series of Fighting on NBC Sports Network. As a remixer, he has worked with acts including Fear Factory, Bullet for My Valentine, Hypocrisy, Noisia, and Monuments, and contributed to the soundtracks of Superhot: Mind Control Delete, Redout 2, and Sonic Racing: CrossWorlds for Sega. He is a YouTube Silver Creator Award holder, and his releases have topped several charts on Beatport, iTunes Russia, Japan and USA, Amazon Germany, Tower Records Japan, and the Deutsche Alternative Charts.

== Biography ==
=== Early Life and Musical Origins ===
Before launching the Zardonic project, Ágreda was active in Venezuela's underground metal scene under several aliases, most notably as keyboardist for the black metal project Gorepriest, with whom he released War Against Humanity: The Armageddon Chronicles (2003), which earned him the Best Keyboardist award at the Premios Metal Hecho en Venezuela 2002–2003.

His first tracks as Zardonic appeared in 2004 and 2005 on the albums Subsonic Stigmata and Red Phasing, released through VeNet Music Development, a Venezuelan netlabel that hosted most of his early output.

=== Breakthrough and International Recognition (2006–2011) ===
In 2006, Zardonic became the first Venezuelan drum and bass producer to release a vinyl single on an international imprint, through Death Brigade Records, and founded Zardonic Recordings, an independent drum and bass netlabel.

In 2007, AK1200, a pioneering figure in the American drum and bass scene, selected Zardonic's "Moonlight Ceremony" for inclusion on his Weapons of Tomorrow compilation, bringing his work to wider international attention. His music subsequently earned the support of artists including Dieselboy, Pendulum, and John B. In a May 2009 interview, Dieselboy named Zardonic among the five most outstanding drum and bass artists of the time.

Also in 2009, Zardonic released "Policia," featuring vocalist James Messinian, through Cymbalism Recordings, his first internationally recognized dancefloor hit, receiving support from prominent DJs including Andy C and DJ Hype.

Around 2010, Ágreda launched a parallel dark ambient project under the name Triangular Ascension. Its debut full-length, Leviathan Device, was recorded at Zardonic Studios in June 2010 and released in 2011 on Cyclic Law, a label widely regarded as one of the foremost imprints in the dark ambient genre. The album was met with considerable critical acclaim within that community, with reviewers praising its "cinematic drones of ruthless atmospheric power."

=== Vulgar Display of Bass and Global Expansion (2012–2014) ===
Released in March 2012 through Big Riddim Recordings, Vulgar Display of Bass marked Zardonic's debut full-length album under that name, featuring collaborations with Counterstrike, Voicians, Mark Instinct, NumberNin6, Run DMT, Reid Speed, Messinian, Krusha, Omar Santana, and others. Upon release, the album debuted at #1 on Beatport's Drum & Bass chart. A crowd-sourced music video for the track "Revolution" incorporated fan-submitted footage representing 46 countries.

Also that year, Zardonic served as the opening act for Dimmu Borgir at La Casa del Artista in Caracas, Venezuela, a performance that also marked the debut of the distinctive stage mask that would become his visual trademark.

A collaboration track with UK dubstep duo Bare Noize appeared that same year on a compilation released through Owsla, the label founded by Skrillex. A 26-date Latin American tour followed, culminating in a headline performance in Tokyo.

A companion remix album, Far Beyond Bass – The Vulgar Remixes (2013), featured reworkings by Black Sun Empire, State of Mind, Neonlight, and others. In 2013, Zardonic signed with eOne Music, later rebranded as MNRK Music Group. The following year, he contributed a remix of the main theme of the Xbox and PlayStation 4 game Strike Suit Zero, featuring Japanese recording artist KOKIA, and was officially endorsed by Image-Line as a member of the FL Studio Power User program.

=== Antihero, Awards, and World Tour (2015–2017) ===
Antihero was released on September 18, 2015 on Entertainment One Music, with Japanese distribution through JVC Kenwood Victor Entertainment, reaching #4 on Tower Records Japan's Hard & Heavy chart. At Venezuela's Unión Rock Show Awards, Zardonic received the Best DJ award at the fifth edition and the Artist of the Year award at the sixth.

His 2016 World Tour comprised 28 dates across 18 countries, including a performance at the Loud Park Festival at the Saitama Super Arena in Japan. His single "Bring It On," featuring Mikey Rukus, was selected as the main theme for the World Series of Fighting on NBC Sports Network, and Zardonic performed live at WSOF 22.

That same year, he appeared as a playable character in the video game Warlocks vs. Shadows, for which he created original sound effects and contributed the tracks "Kickass" and "Sideshow Symphony," both drawn from Vulgar Display of Bass.

=== Become, AEW, and Video Game Soundtracks (2018–2022) ===
Become was released on September 28, 2018 on Entertainment One Music, featuring collaborations with The Qemists on "Takeover" and Celldweller on "Before the Dawn." The album reached #1 on the iTunes Russia Electronic chart, #3 on iTunes Japan, #9 on iTunes USA, and #9 on the Deutsche Alternative Charts, and earned three nominations at the Drum & Bass Arena Awards 2019. The album's track "Revelation," subsequently remixed with Mikey Rukus, served as the official theme for All Elite Wrestling's pay-per-view event Revolution in 2020, broadcast on TNT. His remix of Bullet for My Valentine's "Letting You Go" appeared on the band's Gravity (Deluxe Edition) in 2018.

In 2019, his remix of "Cross The Line" by Mexican dark electro duo Hocico was included on the band's companion remix album Rextinction, released December 12, 2019 on Out of Line Music. In 2020, Zardonic contributed a remix of "Canto Popular" by fellow Venezuelan act Desorden Público, a Grammy-nominated ska band founded in 1985, for the group's anniversary album Canto Popular 25 Años, released December 21, 2020.

In 2020, Zardonic composed the complete soundtrack for Superhot: Mind Control Delete, released on July 16 of that year. He also contributed to the soundtrack of the racing game Redout 2 (2022), alongside Giorgio Moroder and Dance With The Dead. In 2022, four of his remixes, "Disobey," "I Am The Nightrider," "Worthless," and "This Is My Life", were included on Fear Factory's remix album Recoded, released on Nuclear Blast Records.

=== Superstars, Hypocrisy, and Sonic Racing: CrossWorlds (2023–2025) ===
Superstars was released on July 14, 2023 through MNRK Heavy. The album additionally features a cover of New Order's "Blue Monday" featuring REEBZ, originally commissioned as an exclusive track for the Synth Riders virtual reality game's Synthwave Essentials Vol. 3 downloadable content pack. At the Drum & Bass Awards Germany, Zardonic won Best Producer*in for West Germany and placed second in Best DJ for West Germany at the Season 2022/2023 awards, and placed third in Best Album (National) for Superstars at the Season 2023/2024 awards.

Also in 2023, Zardonic was commissioned by Century Media Records for remixes of two tracks by progressive metal act Monuments, both featuring composer Mick Gordon: "Nefarious," reworked alongside co-producer Pythius and released August 10, and "Cardinal Red," released September 7, described in a Century Media press release as taking the track "into uncharted territory, exploring electronic and industrial elements." "Cardinal Red" subsequently appeared on Monuments' In Stasis (Deluxe Edition), released November 16, 2023 on Century Media Records. Also in August 2023, Eric Melvin of NOFX released a Zardonic remix of his Melvinator project's track "Regaining Unconsciousness" on Bottles to the Ground, the label run by Fat Mike. In 2024, his remix of "Machine Gun" by Dutch drum and bass act Noisia was included on The Resonance VII, a retrospective remix compilation on Vision Recordings released April 25, 2024.

In November 2025, Zardonic and producer Pythius released a Metal & Bass interpretation of Hypocrisy's track "Fearless," taken from the band's album Virus, on Wool Music, to coincide with the reissue of Hypocrisy's Classic Series catalogue on Nuclear Blast Records. That same year, Zardonic contributed two arrangements to the soundtrack of Sonic Racing: CrossWorlds (Sega, 2025): a reimagining of "Radical Highway" in collaboration with SEGA composer Jun Senoue, and an arrangement of "Holoska."

=== DIGICIDE (2026–present) ===
DIGICIDE is Zardonic's fifth studio album, scheduled for release on MMC Records. The album fuses heavy drum & bass, industrial metal, and dystopian cyber atmospheres into a thematic work confronting algorithmic domination, surveillance capitalism, and the erosion of human identity through online manipulation and misinformation. The album features an extensive roster of collaborators, including Dino Cazares of Fear Factory, Charles "Ghul" Hedger of Mayhem and Cradle of Filth, Neuroklast, Danny Saber, Enduser, Melek-Tha, Liv Sin, Sinizter, Coppa and many more. The album was produced, performed, and mixed entirely by Ágreda, with executive production by John Lenac and cover art created by Ágreda in collaboration with Rob Sherwood.

== Production and Software Work ==
In addition to his work as a performer and recording artist, Ágreda has served as a remixer, producer, and mixing engineer for a range of artists, including Fear Factory, Bullet For My Valentine, Celldweller, and Pop Evil. He has also developed factory presets and artist packs for a number of music software manufacturers, including Arturia, Brainworx, Slate Digital, BABY Audio, and GForce Software.

== Discography ==
=== As Zardonic ===
- 2012: Vulgar Display of Bass (Big Riddim Recordings)
- 2013: Far Beyond Bass – The Vulgar Remixes (Big Riddim Recordings)
- 2015: Antihero (Entertainment One Music)
- 2018: Become (Entertainment One Music)
- 2020: Superhot: Mind Control Delete Soundtrack
- 2023: Superstars (MNRK Heavy)
- 2027: DIGICIDE (MMC Records)

=== As Triangular Ascension ===
- 2011: Leviathan Device (Cyclic Law)
- 2013: The Chronos Anomaly (Cyclic Law)

=== As Gorepriest ===
- 2003: War Against Humanity: The Armageddon Chronicles

== See also ==
- Drum and bass
- Industrial metal
