= Superhot: Mind Control Delete =

2020 video game

- Developer: Superhot Team
- Publisher: Superhot Team
- Directors: Cezary Skorupka; Marcin Surma
- Composer: Zardonic
- Engine: Unity
- Platforms: PlayStation 4; macOS; Windows; Xbox One
- Release: 16 July 2020
- Genre: First-person shooter
- Mode: Single-player

Superhot: Mind Control Delete is a 2020 independent first-person shooter video game developed and published by Superhot Team. It is a sequel to 2016's Superhot and expands on the game mechanics by utilizing roguelike elements.

== Gameplay ==
Superhot: Mind Control Delete retains the core mechanics of its predecessor and adds roguelike elements: Players are placed on a level (represented as a text mode graph) and must complete each node to access the other nodes connected to it. To complete a node, the player must complete a sequence of consecutive maps of Superhot. These maps themselves feature endlessly spawning enemies, and the player must kill a certain amount of them to complete the map; unlike Superhot, however, the player has a certain amount of hearts they can lose before they are killed - if they are killed, the sequence is regenerated and the player must begin the sequence again from the start. There are four levels in total, with the ultimate goal being finding the node to move to the level above: As the player goes on, the difficulty increases, with longer sequences, some enemies holding guns that break when the enemy is killed, enemies who are only partially vulnerable, enemies that explode into projectiles when killed, environmental hazards and glitching scenery.

Throughout the game, the player can utilize two kinds of power-ups they can find in certain nodes: one of four "core" power-ups - "More" adds an extra third heart to the player's health, "Charge" teleports a player to an enemy and punches it, "Recall" causes a thrown katana to return and slice everything in its way, and "Hotswitch" is the switching ability from the first game - can be selected before each map sequence, while choices between two random "hack" powerups may be offered at certain points during a sequence; both types only last for the duration of that sequence. The power-ups may increase health, shorten reload time, increase player speed or ammo capacity, or offer some other gameplay benefit. Finding a power-up node unlocks that power-up to be available from the random pool, and also provides a short tutorial for it; "core" nodes also require players to complete a map sequence before unlocking the power-up.

On the third level, three nodes introduce invulnerable boss enemies who must be evaded while collecting the kills; each of them feature one of the core abilities they use against the player: "Dog" uses Charge, "Nindża" uses Recall, and "Addict" uses Hotswitch. Once introduced, these enemies can randomly appear on any map, accompanied by a musical stab.

== Plot ==
Mind Control Delete's storytelling is more sparse than its predecessor's, and is largely told in text fragments found in nodes; the story alludes to four characters - the player and the three boss enemies - inside the Superhot entity: The protagonist, "Avarice", is shown to be obsessed with getting "more" (a theme that permeates the game UI by using the word "MORE" as e.g. the button to start the game), and is presented in a recurring sequence where the player is in an abandoned building and has to kill a lone enemy sitting in front of Superhot; "Dog" appears to be a mentally disabled person crippled by anxiety, "Nindża" (Note: Polish phonetic spelling of "ninja") appears to be a school student using Superhot to gain katana skills in order to take revenge on their bully, and "Addict" appears to be a person addicted to the game, with allusions that the Addict is in fact the protagonist of the original Superhot.

After the fourth level, the player can reach a fifth, glitched level, where the game demands them to "give up" their core power-ups, through a level sequence with the corresponding boss, after which the game removes that core from the game permanently. Following that, the game then forces the player to give up their hacks as well, and finishes on a lengthy map sequence where the player has no special abilities left. The game then insists that the player must give up even more things, and in the following level sequence, the player must give up all basic game functionality like shooting or looking around one-by-one, until the game declares the final thing to give up is "control", and it ends the game with the same recurring Avarice sequence as it has done previously.

The game then reverts to the title screen, only allowing the player to keep pressing "SUPER" / "HOT" while the game declares that with all the negative things like anger and addiction gone, the player finally has "peace of mind". The menu cursor eventually reappears, and the player can control it to look around a giant text mode map, and as the game protests and insists that there is nothing more to the game, they can find three small text mode minigames, and a line that leads to a data scanning node, then a data selection node, and eventually a data recovery node. All three nodes trigger a progress bar, the third of which takes 2.5 hours in real time, during which the game scrolls through the end credits backwards, and plays the song "Niech Wszystko Spłonie" by Cool Kids of Death, and a chiptune from around the halfway mark until the end.

Once the data recovery ends, the player is returned to the map in the state before the fifth level, with all cores and hacks available, and a new core called Pure which disables hacks and only allows one heart for extra challenge.

== Development ==
Superhot: Mind Control Delete was released into early access in December 2017, and was officially released on 16 July 2020. Players who owned the original game before Mind Control Delete came out were given free copies on the release date.

The game features a soundtrack by Zardonic.

== Reception ==
Reception

Aggregate scores
Aggregator	Score
Metacritic	PC: 78/100; PS4: 77/100; XONE: 82/100
OpenCritic	83% recommend

Review scores
Publication	Score
Destructoid	9.5/10
Game Informer	8.75/10
GameRevolution	3.5/5
GameSpot	7/10
PC Gamer (US)	82/100
Push Square	8/10
The Guardian	4/5

The game has received "generally favorable reviews" on the review aggregation website Metacritic. Fellow review aggregator OpenCritic assessed that the game received strong approval, being recommended by 83% of critics. Destructoid's Anthony Marzano called it "possibly one of the most fun games I've ever played", and "an improvement on everything that made the original Superhot great." GameSpot's Justin Clark was more mixed in his review, writing "The fundamental flaw of Mind Control Delete is that it's adding complication to a game premise that works largely because of its simplicity."
