= Ban on bullfighting in Catalonia =

2012 ban

Bullfighting was banned in the Spanish autonomous community of Catalonia by a vote of the Catalan Parliament in July 2010. The ban came into effect on 1 January 2012. The last bullfight in the region took place on 25 September 2011 at La Monumental. The ban was officially annulled for being unconstitutional by Spain's highest court on 5 October 2016. However, despite the overturning of the ban, no further bullfights had taken place in Catalonia as of July 2020.

== Bullfighting in Catalonia ==
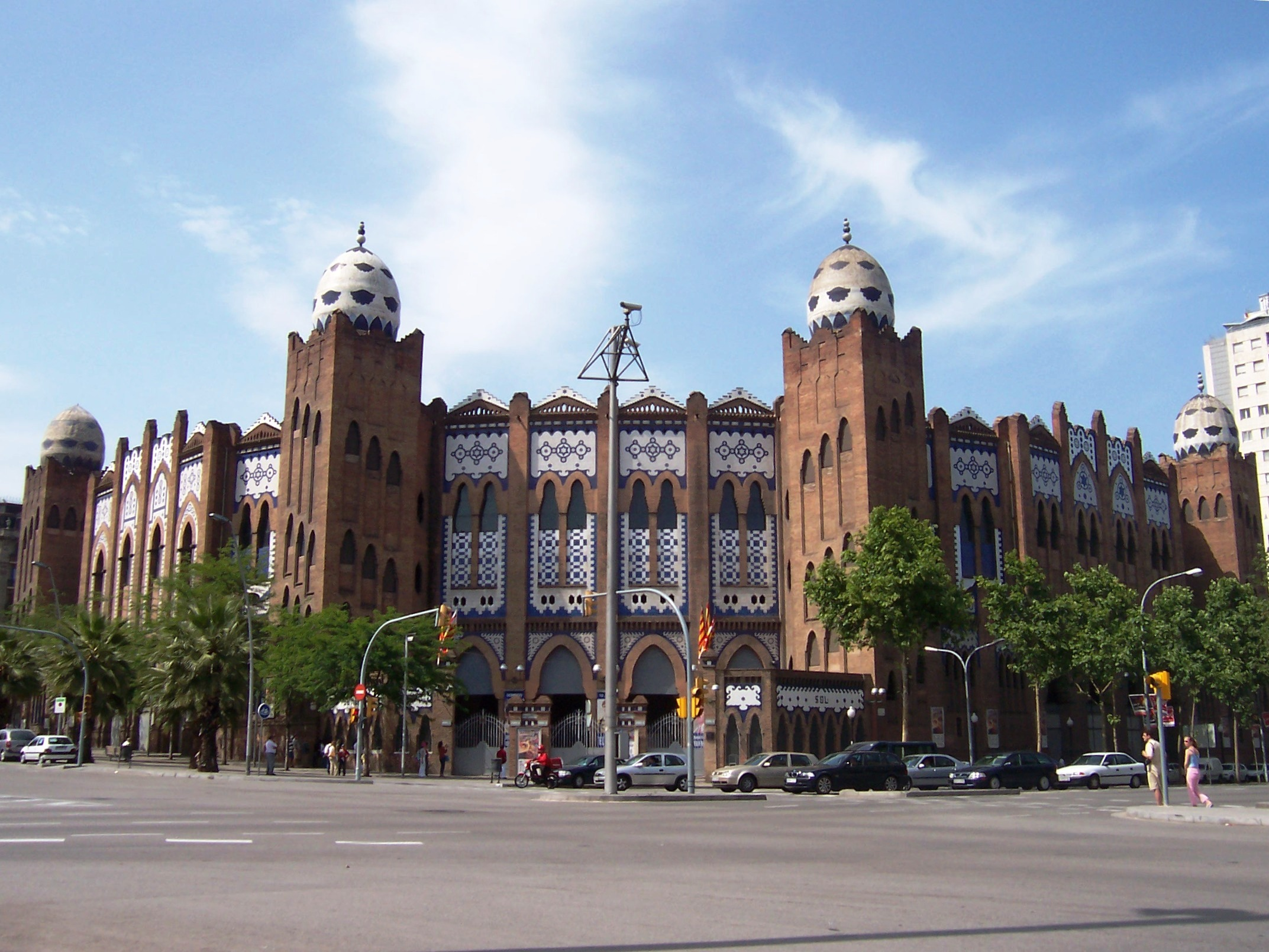
La Monumental bullring in Barcelona

The earliest recorded fight in Catalonia took place in 1387, although, as elsewhere in Spain, it was not until the early 19th century that bullfighting in the region took its form as a modern spectator sport. By the early 20th century, it had become one of the major entertainment attractions in Catalonia. The region still preserves some of the oldest bullrings in Spain, such as the Plaça Clarà in Olot (built in 1859), and the bullring in Figueres (1894). The 1897 bullring in Girona was demolished in 2006.

The sport declined in popularity in recent decades. By 2011, the only operating bullring in Catalonia was La Monumental in Barcelona, where 20 fights were organized in 2009. This compares to 284 fights organized in the Community of Madrid (with a similar population to Catalonia). Nine fights were organized between April and July 2010. Organizers say that average attendance is around 7,000 people, of whom 400 are season ticket holders.

== 2010 ban ==
A ban on bullfighting in Catalonia was approved by the Catalan Parliament on 28 July 2010, following a petition (or Popular Legislative Initiative, PLI) organised by the PROU platform (Catalan for 'Enough!'). The petition attracted 180,000 signatures. The parliamentary vote was 68 votes for and 55 against, with 9 abstentions Catalonia became the second autonomous community in Spain to ban bullfighting after the Canary Islands did so in 1991. The ban came into force on 1 January 2012. Bullfights by matadors were banned in Catalonia at the end 2011 but bull-dodging, in which bulls are not killed, remains lawful. The last bullfight in Catalonia took place on 25 September 2011 at La Monumental. In October 2016 the Catalonian ban on bullfighting was overturned by the Spanish Constitutional Court. The Court ruled that, though an autonomous region is allowed to regulate bullfighting, an autonomous region is not in a legal position to fully ban such fights.

== Controversy ==
The campaign to ban bullfighting in Catalonia was strongly supported by animal rights groups and gained the backing of celebrities including Ricky Gervais and Pamela Anderson. Opponents of the ban suggested that it was not motivated by animal welfare concerns, but by the desire of Catalan nationalists to eradicate from the region something seen as culturally Spanish. The ban did not cover the Catalan tradition of correbous (roughly meaning bulls running by the streets), including its bou embolat version, in which lit flares are attached to the horns of a bull, cited as an inconsistency by both opponents of the ban and animal rights activists.

== Popular Legislative Initiative ==
The approval of the PLI repealed the exception to the second paragraph of Article 6 of the Animal Protection Act:

a) Bullfighting in places where, on the effective date of Law 3/1988, of March 4th, regarding animal welfare, there are bullrings built to perform it, to which access must be prohibited to persons under fourteen years of age.

— Law 3/1988,

And added to the first paragraph:

f. Bullfights and bull shows that include the death of the animal and the application of the lance, the banderillas and the sword, as well as any bull shows of any type that are performed in bullrings or out of them, with the exception of celebrations with bulls that are referred to in section b) of the second paragraph of article 6.

=== Votes ===

	Yes	No	Abs
Convergence and Union; Convergència i Unió (CiU)	32	7	6
Socialists' Party of Catalonia; Partit dels Socialistes de Catalunya, (PSC)	3	31	3
Republican Left of Catalonia; Esquerra Republicana de Catalunya, (ERC)	21		
People's Party of Catalonia; Partit Popular de Catalunya (PP)		14	
Initiative for Catalonia Greens-United and Alternative Left; Iniciativa per Catalunya Verds-Esquerra Unida i Alternativa (ICV-EUiA)	12		
Citizens – Party of the Citizenry; Ciutadans - Partit de la Ciutadania (C's)		3	
TOTAL	68	55	9
