= Bellesguard =

Vacation house in Barcelona

Coordinates: 41°24′34″N 2°07′36″E

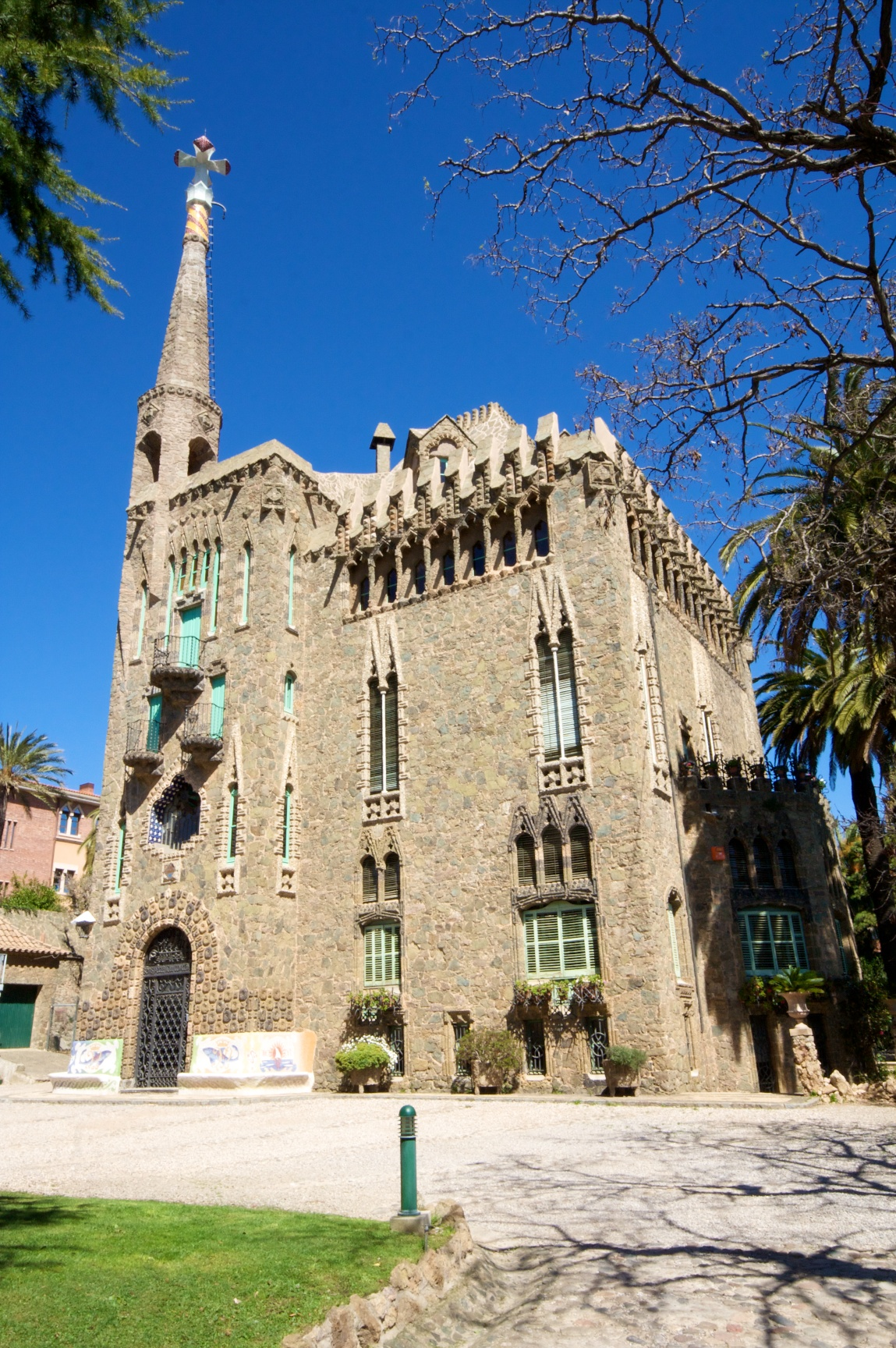
- Alternative names: Casa Figueras

General information
- Architectural style: Modernisme
- Location: Barcelona, Spain

Design and construction
- Architect: Antoni Gaudí

Spanish Cultural Heritage
- Type: Non-movable
- Criteria: Monument
- Designated: 24 July 1969
- Reference no.: RI-51-0003817

Bellesguard (Catalan pronunciation: [ˌbeʎəzˈɣwaɾt], "Beautiful View"), also known as Casa Figueras, is a modernist manor house designed by Catalan architect Antoni Gaudí, which was constructed between 1900 and 1909.

It is located at the Sarrià-Sant Gervasi district of Barcelona in Catalonia, Spain. The ground on which Bellesguard stands had been the site of a country residence belonging to Martin, king of Aragon and count of Barcelona.

Gaudí was assisted by Joan Rubió whilst Domènec Sugrañes i Gras created the various mosaics that adorn the house.

== History ==
=== Early years ===
Gaudí drew inspiration for Casa Figueras from the medieval castle that once stood on the same site, built for the King of Aragon in the early 15th century. When the King of Aragon died without an heir in 1410, his widow, Margaret of Prades, inherited the estate. Following her death, the castle fell into decline and was passed from hand to hand over centuries until Jaume Figueras purchased the estate in 1900.

When Jaume Figueras and his wife, María Sagues Molíns, commissioned Gaudí for the project in 1900, all that remained of the initial structure were a few walls and the patio. Still, Gaudí was aware of the important history this location bore to Catalonia, so he worked to preserve the medieval spirit of the ruins, as is evident in the exterior resemblance to a medieval castle, complemented by signature aspects of Gaudí's architectural style. As always, Gaudí sought to blend the construction with its natural surroundings, hence the exterior is made with stone slate. Through Gaudí's incorporation of decorative elements resonant of natural surroundings together with traditional gothic characteristics, the façade of the structure is still best understood as neogothic, though there is no denying the modernist elements in the actual Torre Bellesguard. Gaudí designed the home in a period where he himself was still developing his unique style. For instance, while the building displays Gaudí's iconic mosaic detailing and incorporation of natural elements, it does not include Moorish accents and bright colors (aside from the stripes on the tower cross), which are key distinctive characteristics in much of his later works.

Gaudí was given free rein to design and construct what was intended as a second home for the Jaume family, however this freedom bestowed to the artist later proved disastrous for the family. Figueras died before the construction had finished, leaving the responsibility of overseeing the final construction to his wife, who grew increasingly frustrated with constant delays due to Gaudí's obsessive detailing. While the months Gaudí dedicated to placing trencadís (his iconic mosaic detailing) on the structure are part of what makes the home so beautiful today, the process added such significant time and cost to the construction that Molíns was never actually able to live in the home and even had to sell it to avoid bankruptcy.

=== Guilera family ===
The house changed hands for several years until the Guilera family purchased the home in 1944 and has continued to own it for over 70 years. When Lluís Guilera Molas first bought Casa Figueras in 1944, the esteemed doctor intended to convert the building into a modernist hospital, similar to Sant Pau, dedicated to cancer treatment and research. The building continued to serve medical purposes following Lluís' death in 1969 when his son, Lluís Guilera Soler, a gynecologist and obstetrician, inherited the home and hospital. Several Barcelona citizens were born in Casa Figueras until 1974 when the site of the hospital relocated to a more accessible area better suited to medical needs. From that point on, the original building has served the purpose that Gaudí always intended—a private home.

For the past 30 years, the Guilera family has left the gates open permitting guests to stroll the gardens and observe the home's exquisite exterior. Over the years, they received countless requests from visitors to explore inside the home and enjoy Gaudí's more modernist interior detailing. Both due to the popular demand from visitors as well as the family's realization that restoration was necessary, the Guilera family began plans to open their home to the public in 2009. The need for restoration was a particularly strong factor in influencing the Guilera family to open their home to the public, as they realized that in living in such a historic and architectural jewel they also assumed responsibility of its preservation. As areas of the home began to deteriorate and the bustling urban life of Barcelona began to encroach on their secluded natural sanctuary, the family realized that it was time to open the home to tours to ease the finances required to maintain the unique Gaudí landmark. The family officially began inviting tours in September 2013, offering access to the interior accompanied by explanations of the history and architecture.

== Description ==
=== Exterior ===
Casa Figueras is constructed mainly of stone and brick. The general structure measures a square base of 15 × 15 m and is 19.5 m high, with an area of 900 m. The exterior façade is more neogothic, as Gaudí intended to pay tribute to the original medieval castle that once stood at the site. As is such, Gaudí used more straight lines, seldom seen in his usual work, which is especially apparent in the parapets and surface of the walls. The iconic tower, Torre Bellesguard, juts out from a corner of a base, adding to the vertical alignment of the structure created by the straight, vertical lines in his design. Torre Bellesguard is perhaps what the building is most recognized for, displaying Gaudí's typical cross of four arms decorated with red and yellow mosaics to mimic the Catalan flag. At the base of the cross one can also see what appears to be a crown wrapped around the circumference, likely Gaudi's symbolic acknowledgment of the site's significance to the crown of Aragon. At the entrance of the house, one can find an inscription that reads, “Maria Purrisima sens pecat fou concebuda,” meaning “Purest Maria, conceived without sin.” Above the entrance door is a stunning stained glass window in the form of the 8-pointed star of Venus.

=== Interior ===
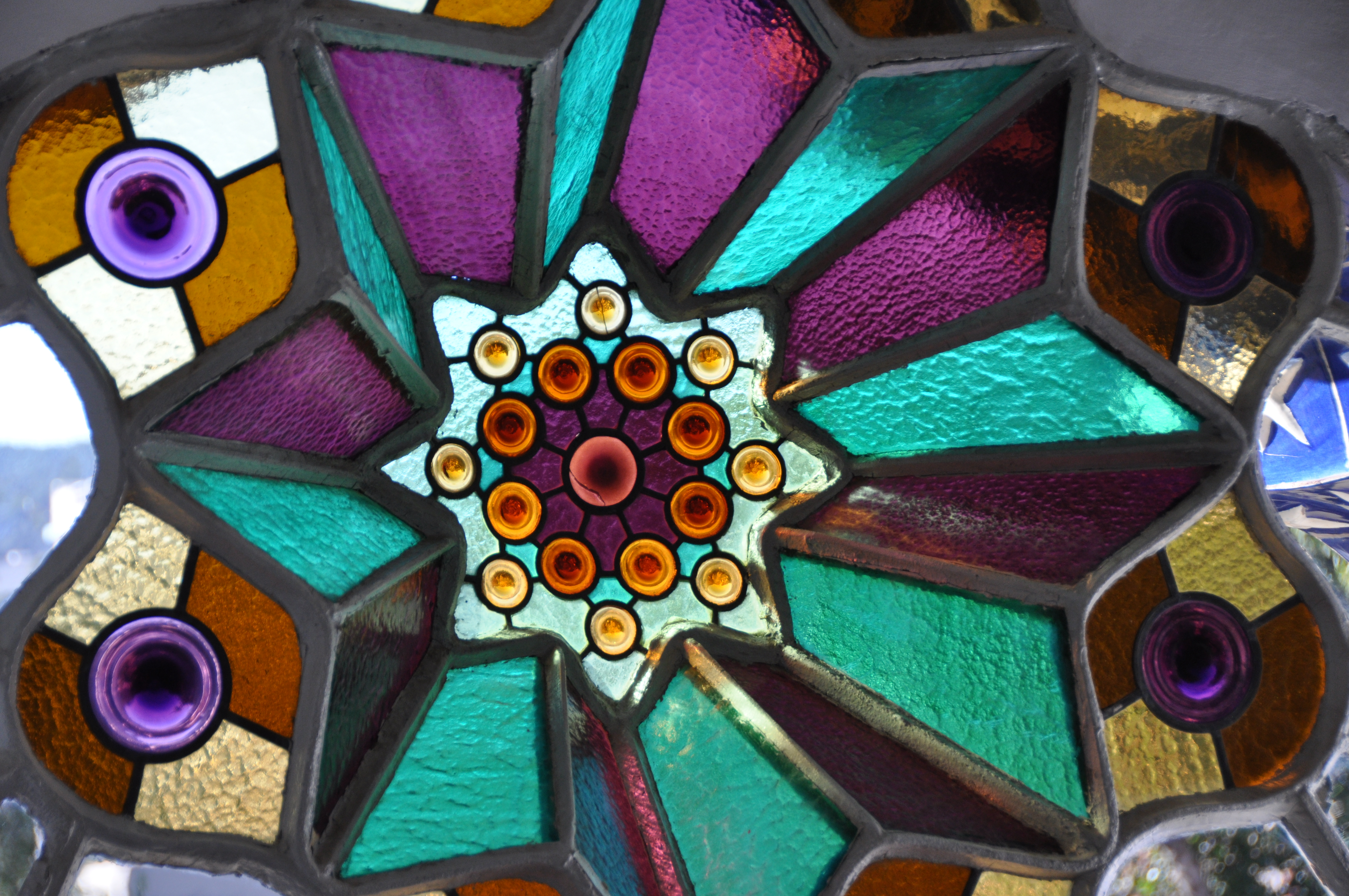
Casa Figueras stained glass entrance window

Casa Figueras consists of a ground floor, a main floor, a basement, and an attic. The interior of the home is different from the more gothic exterior, and instead demonstrates Gaudí's modernist style. Gaudí employed unusual placement of many windows to make use of natural light, aided by the white plastered walls, in keeping with his theme of integrating his structures with natural surroundings. The light in the entrance hall is heightened by the coloured glass of the window and the use of iron detailing. Many of the ceilings use a structure of superimposed layers of bricks, also known as the Catalan arc. From the inside, a support mechanism can be seen, resembling an iron spider-web that is used to support the tower's pinnacle. Also only visible from the inside is the dragon Gaudí designed on the terrace as part of the tower base. The slate detailing of the roof illustrate the dragon's tails, with elevated areas to create the illusion of nostrils, while two windows on either side of the dragon's "profile" create the eyes.

=== The grounds ===
The grounds include remaining elements from the 15th century medieval castle, in particular some remains of the original walls which, although mimicked by the gothic aspects of Gaudí's 20th century work that surround them, are still distinguishable from the more modern structure. At the entrance to the garden is the Crown of Aragon's shield, which is engraved with two dates: 1409, noting the completion of the original castle, and 1909, the year in which Gaudi's Torre Bellesguard was completed. The shield also features a rising sun symbolizing these two momentous historical moments. The mosaic benches next to the structure's façade are decorated using the Trancadís technique, however these benches were actually the work of Gaudi's apprentice, Domènec Sugrañes i Gras, whose style is characterized as more uniform and Roman when compared to Gaudi's more uneven approach. Also in the garden is an iron cross, suspected to have been constructed by Gaudí himself (instead of one of his apprentices).

== Etymology ==
The term Bellesguard comes from the Catalan for "Beautiful View", representing the fact that the building lies at halfway up the Collserola mountain overlooking Barcelona and consequently provides wide views over the city. The name dates to the age of Martin of Aragon, who had a summer residence on the site in the 15th century and subsequently coined the name Bellesguard.

The Bellesguard is sometimes called the Casa Figueras because it was commissioned by Maria Sagués, widow of Jaume Figueras. Sagués was a longtime admirer of Gaudís work and she commissioned him to design the building 1900.

== Gallery ==
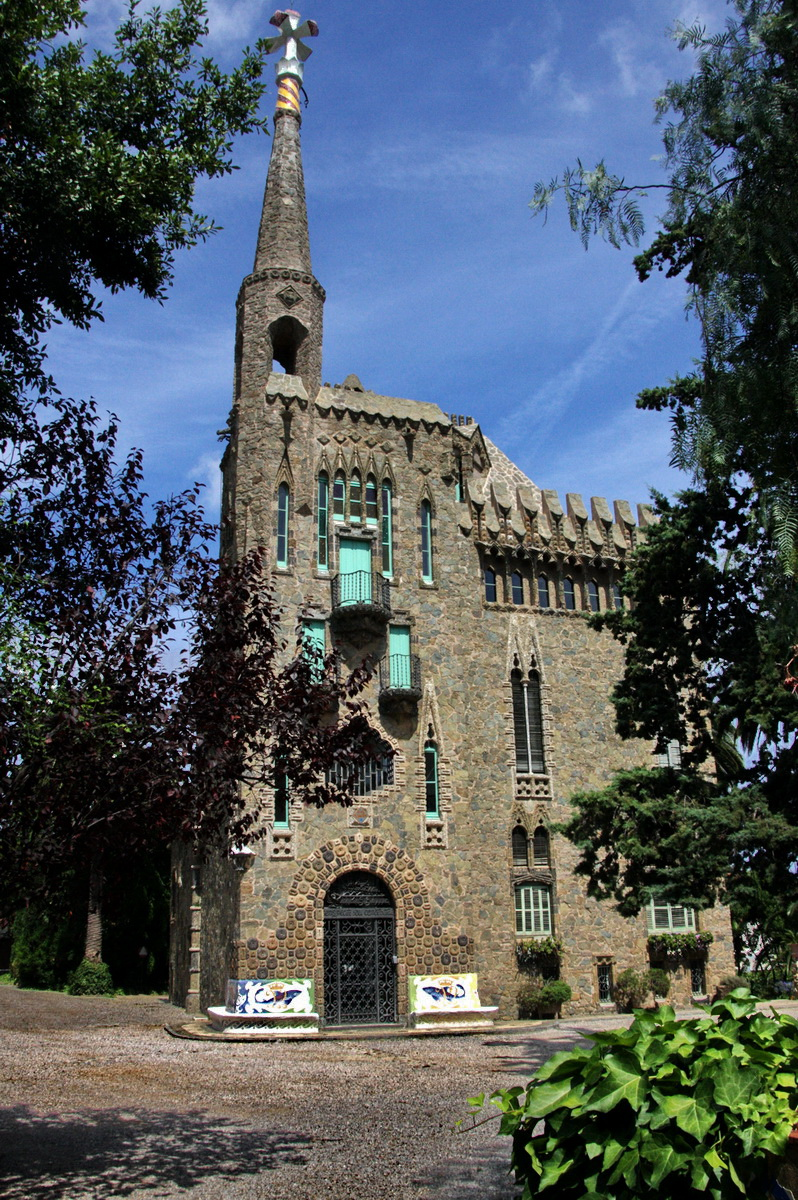
Bellesguard

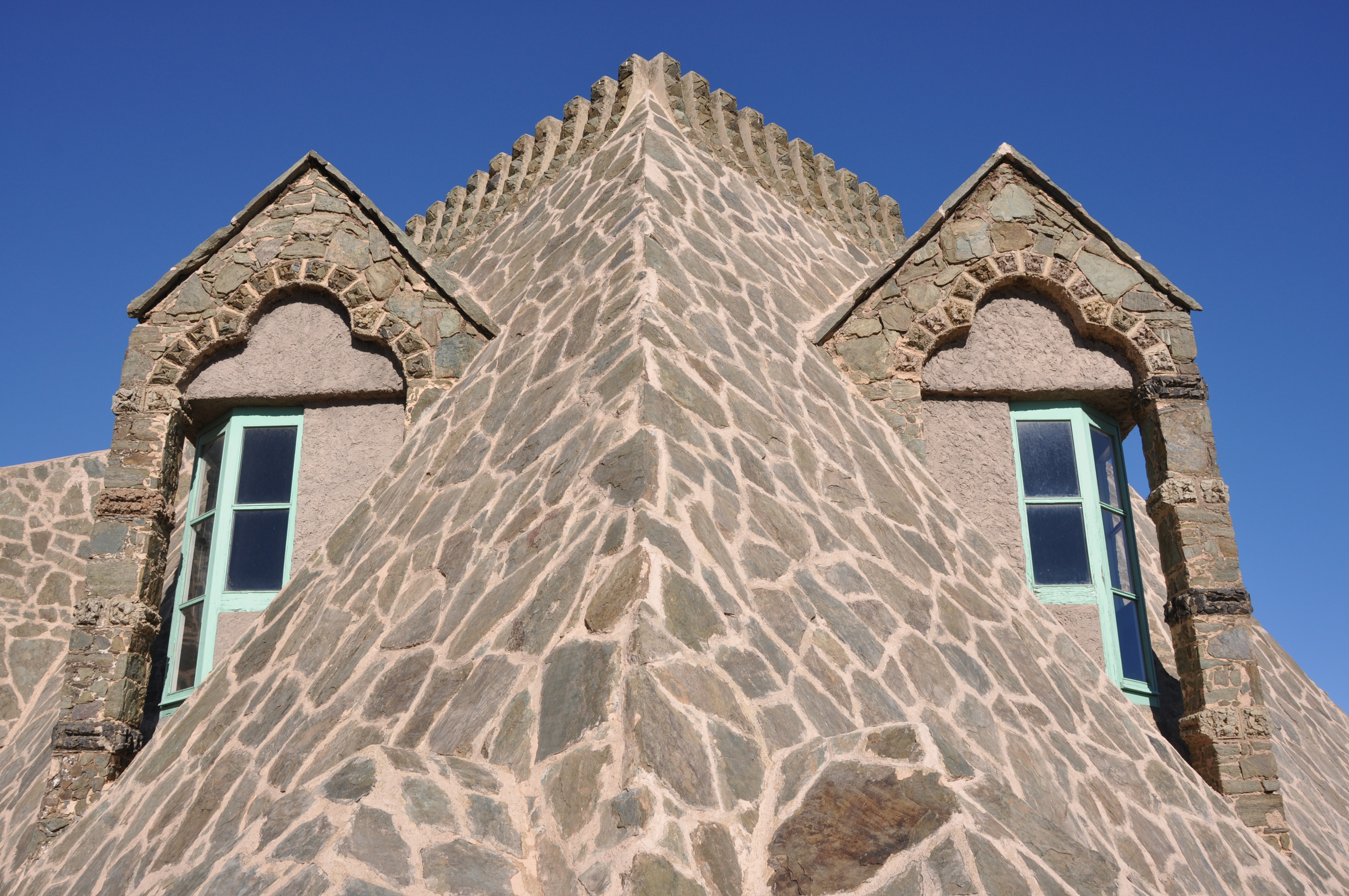
Casa Figueras Terrace Dragon

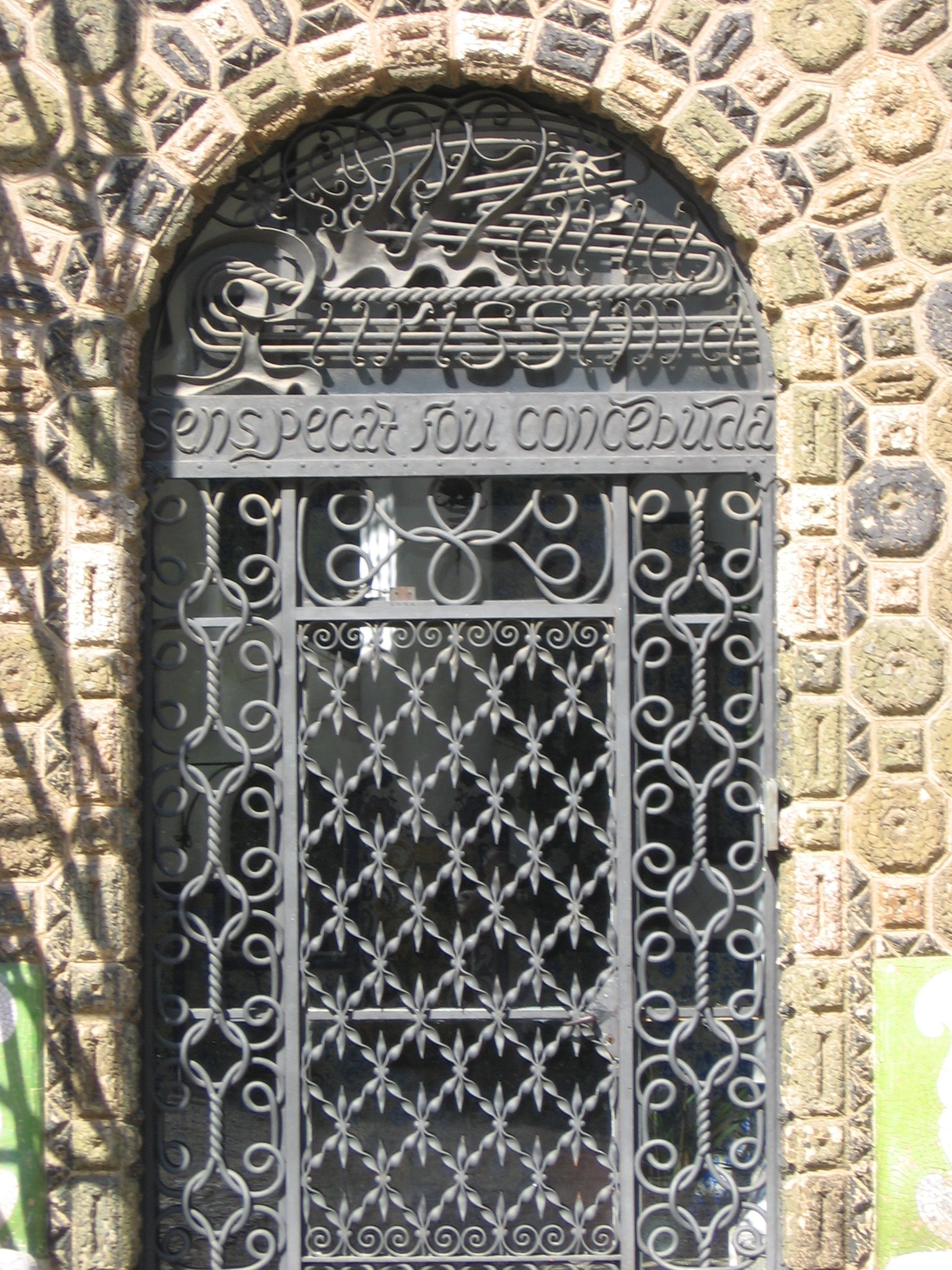
Entrance

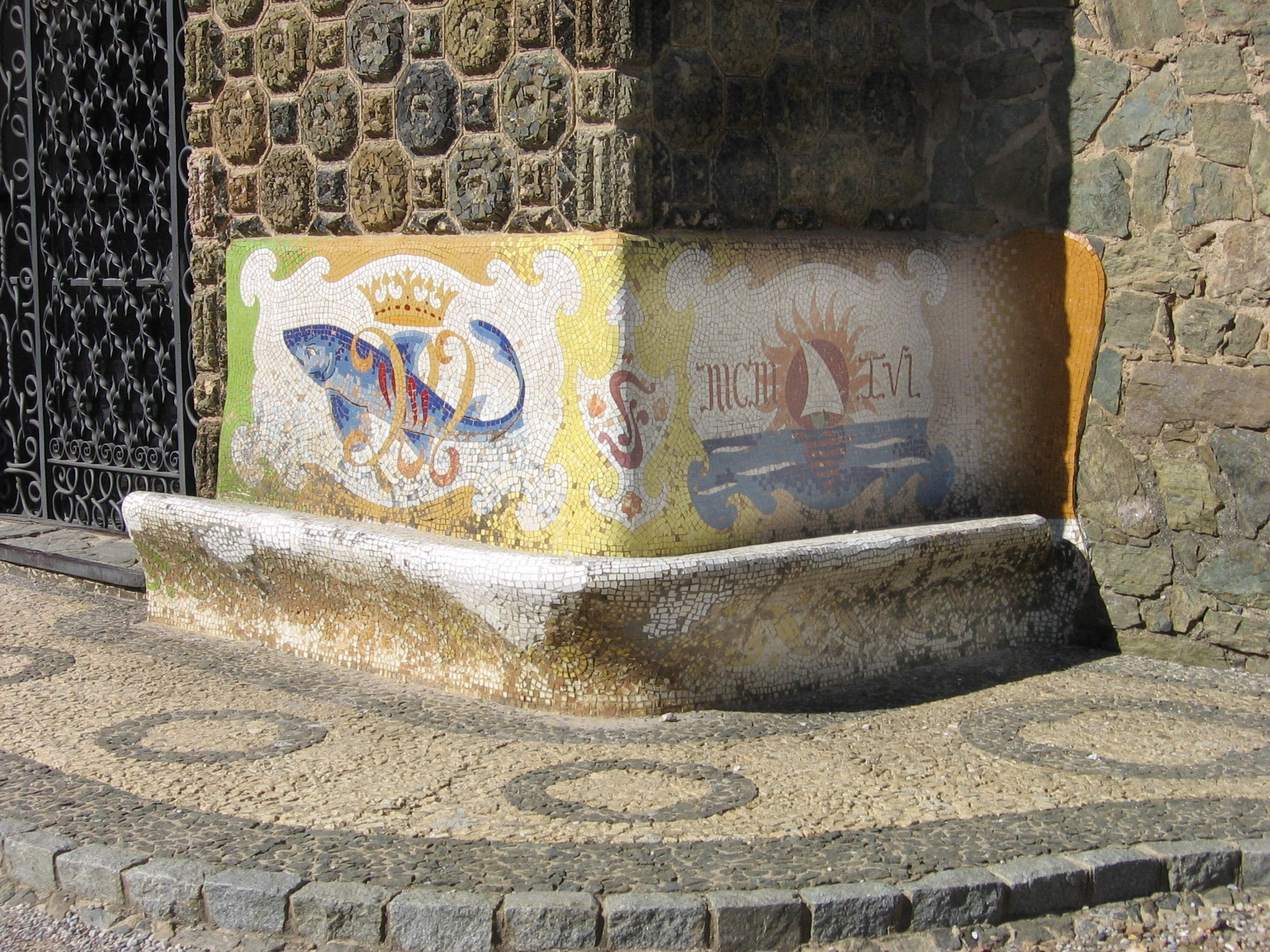
Seating area by the entrance, with mosaics from Domènec Sugrañes i Gras

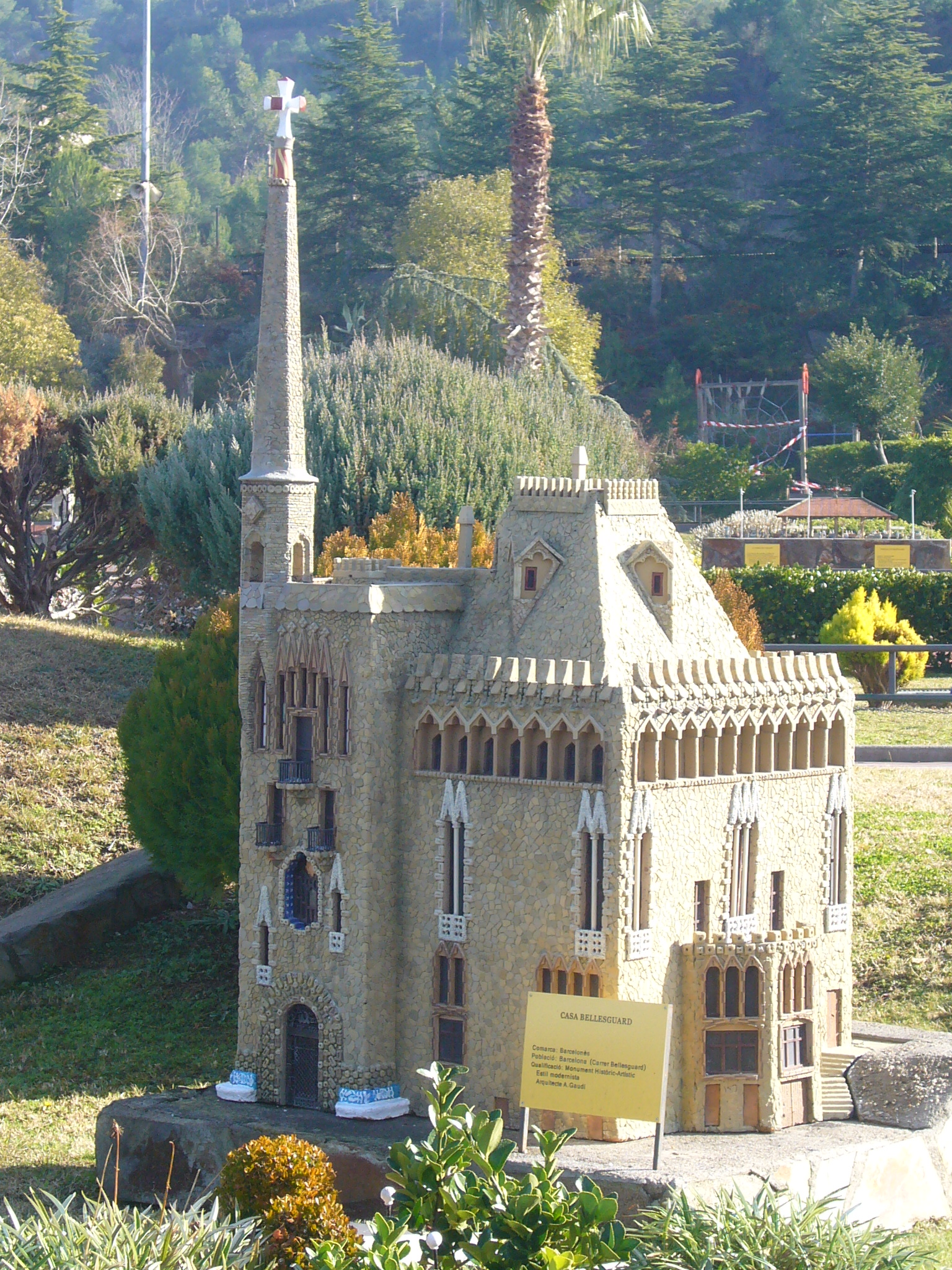
Bellesguard scale model at Catalunya en Miniatura

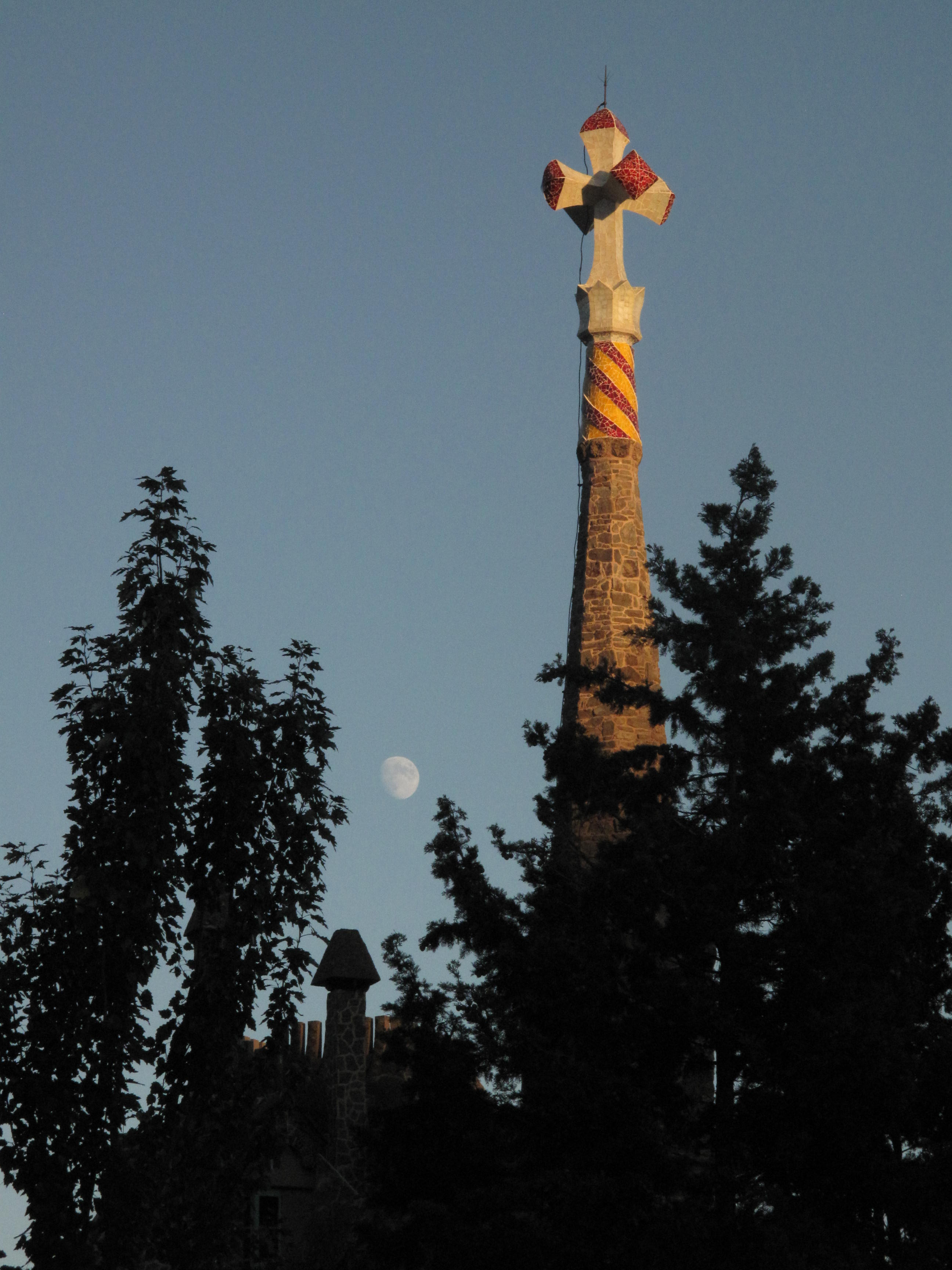
Bellesguard Pinacle Cross

== See also ==
- List of Modernisme buildings in Barcelona
- List of Gaudí buildings

== Sources ==
- Rainer Zerbst - Antoni Gaudí, Taschen, 2002.
