= Cine Monumental =

Cine Monumental may refer to several cinemas:

- Cine Monumental (Buenos Aires), in Buenos Aires, Argentina
- Cine Monumental (Rosario), in Rosario, Santa Fe

== See also ==
- Monumental (disambiguation)
