= Monument (company) =

American telemedicine alcohol treatment company

Monument Inc.
- Trade name: Monument
- Type: Private
- Industry: Telemedicine
- Founded: 2020; 6 years ago New York City
- Founder: Mike Russell
- Headquarters: New York City
- Area served: United States
- Key people: Mike Russell (CEO)
- Services: Online therapy; Online medication prescriptions; Online support groups
- Website: joinmonument.com

Monument Inc. is an American telemedicine company that provides online treatment for alcohol use disorder. Founded in New York City by entrepreneur Mike Russell and launched in 2020, the company offers therapy and physician appointments as well as support groups entirely through video calls.

== History ==
Entrepreneur Mike Russell started Monument after selling his third startup, Paintzen, when he realized that he was a binge drinker and struggling with alcohol use disorder. Monument received $7.5 million in seed funding in 2019 before officially launching in early 2020.

Monument acquired Tempest, an online platform for alcohol recovery care, in 2022.

In March 2023, Monument announced that they had leaked sensitive user data to companies like Facebook, Google, Microsoft, and Pinterest through the use of their website trackers. In the same announcement, Monument said they removed all usage of website trackers.

In April 2024, Monument was banned by the Federal Trade Commission from disclosing users' health information to third-parties for advertising purposes and fined $2.5 million for violating the Opioid Addiction Recovery Fraud Prevention Act of 2018. The penalty was suspended due to the company's inability to pay.
