= Monuments (synthpop band) =

Italian band

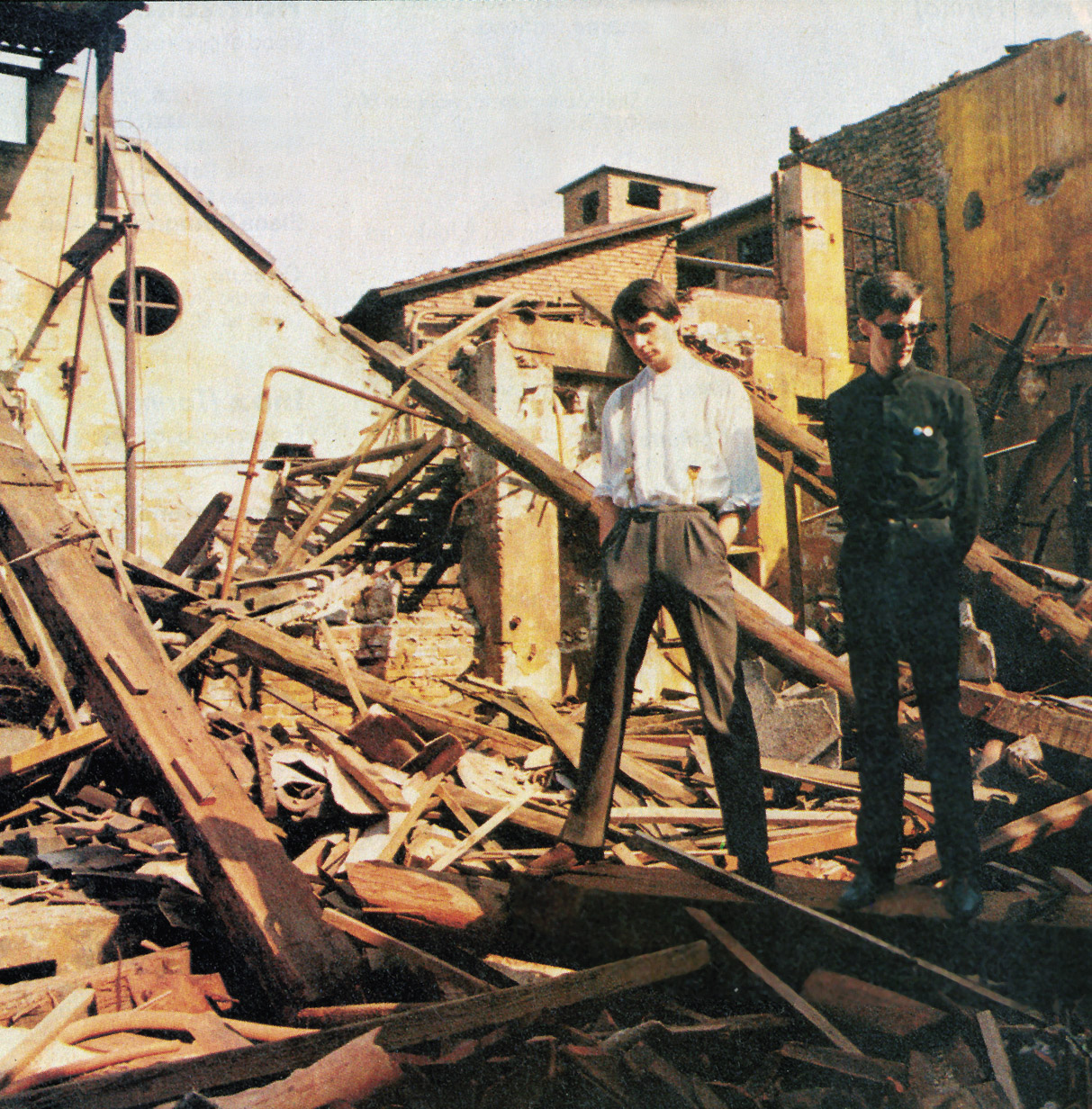
- Monuments, 1981. Left to right: Andrea Costa, Mauro Tavella

Background information
- Origin: Turin, Italy
- Genres: Synthpop, electronic, new wave, dark wave (early)
- Years active: 1981–2002, 2006–present
- Labels: Mannequin Records, Anna Logue Records
- Members: Andrea Costa; Mauro Tavella
- Past members: Marino Paire (2006–2012)
- Website: www.monuments-music.com

Monuments is a synthpop band founded in January 1981 in Turin, Italy.

== History ==
The band emerged from the new wave band Tecknospray (1978–81), where the founding members played as guitarist/keyboardist and bassist/keyboardist. In the new line-up, Mauro Tavella (synthesizer and programs) and Andrea Costa (synthesizer and vocals) immediately decided to dedicate themselves exclusively to electronic music. Their aim was to blend traditional pop melodies with the latest synthesized sounds.

Live concerts were performed on a “synthesizers and percussion” recorded base coming from a 4-track tape player. This was normally supported by visual material (slides shows and 16mm film clips). The melodies, the main instrumental parts and vocals were always played live. The four most important tours were: Ice Age (40 dates in Piedmont and around Italy, from 1981 to 1982); Monuments from the Future (60 dates from 1983 to 1984, with 8 shows in Germany); Nite & Lite (50 dates spanning 1984 and 1985, with 10 shows in France and Belgium); Per mangiare le nuvole (about 40 dates from 1985 to 1986, including a show in which they represented new Italian music at the first Mediterranean Biennial in Barcelona (1985)). They also did some impromptu sound performances such as "Sunset Boulevard" in 1984, during which Monuments played a two-hour improvised soundtrack to accompany a sunset at 2,400 meters in the Alps.

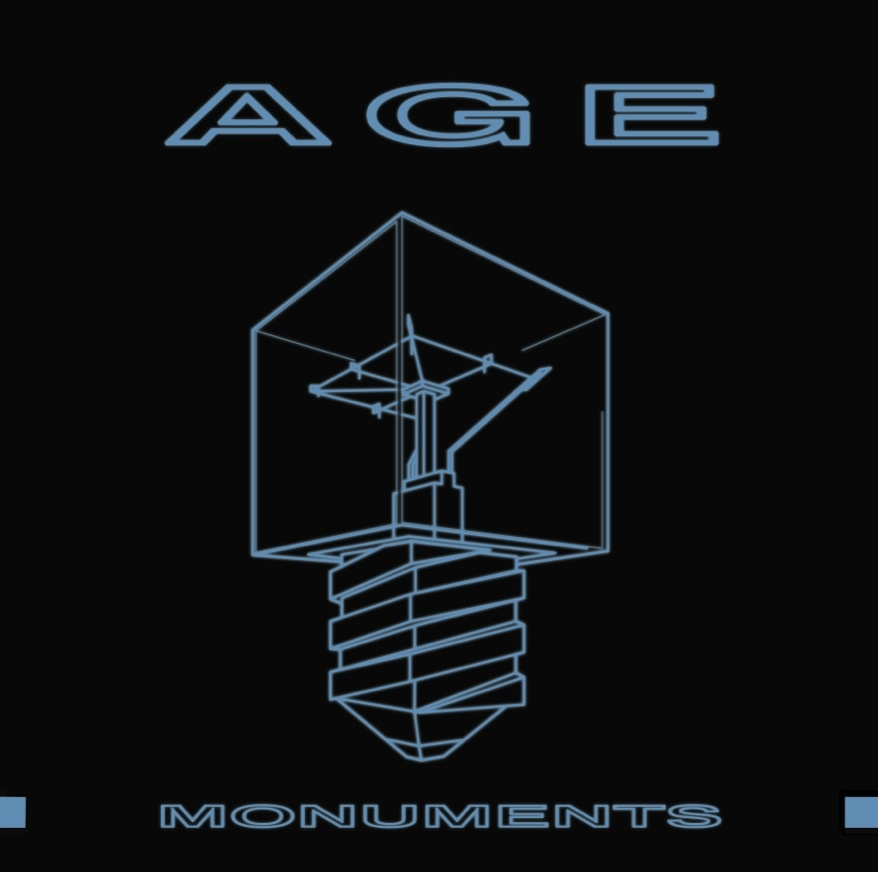
Monuments, Age Cover 1984

In 1986, Monuments decided to abandon live shows. In previous years, they had often been commissioned to write music and now decided to return to their private studio to work on soundtracks for the theatre, radio and independent cinema. In 1987, they pooled economic and physical resources by joining with Carlo Ubaldo Rossi and Andrea Lesmo to create a professional recording studios such as Transeuropa Recording Studio. This new lineup mixed and produced a lot of independent music for artists such as Litfiba, Neon, Moda and others, as well as composing new material on commission. In 1995, Monuments start working on new live experiment, Electronìa Alchemica, which would see them working exclusively with sound (bringing the mixer on stage) to produce a quadraphonic concert. The show was only performed in a few select venues.

In 2002, the duo agreed to have a break. Mauro Tavella devoted his time to working as technical director and occasional producer on projects for Africa Unite and also worked as a freelance in many different recording studios in the city. Andrea Costa worked on a few experimental solo projects and also began providing technical and artistic support for fashion shows and conventions.

In 2006, Costa and Tavella rekindled the Monuments project by inviting singer/composer Marino Paire to work with them. They had already collaborated with him over the years in parallel experiences, and they had planned to add him to the lineup in 1986, but the change in direction of the duo placed the idea on the back burner. In 2007, Anna Logue Records contacted them to discuss reissuing some of the old material and some previously unheard tracks. This resulted in XXVII coming out at the beginning of 2008. This CD is an anthology containing the best of the group’s early years (1981–84). The first ever piece by the duo, Die Denkmäler (1981), was specially rearranged for the occasion in a more modern guise, and represents a crossover point towards their most recent work. Between 2008 and 2010, Monuments tested the new line-up in Turin with an improvised live performance (Electronìa Alchemica 2). They also reinterpreted some pieces by Mozart for a live performance by Italian artist Maurizio Vetrugno. They produced a multimedia installation called Up/Down for a contemporary art exhibition. At the same time, a number of compilations came out on the market containing tracks by Monuments. In 2012, Marino Paire left the band. A new album will be released in a short time.

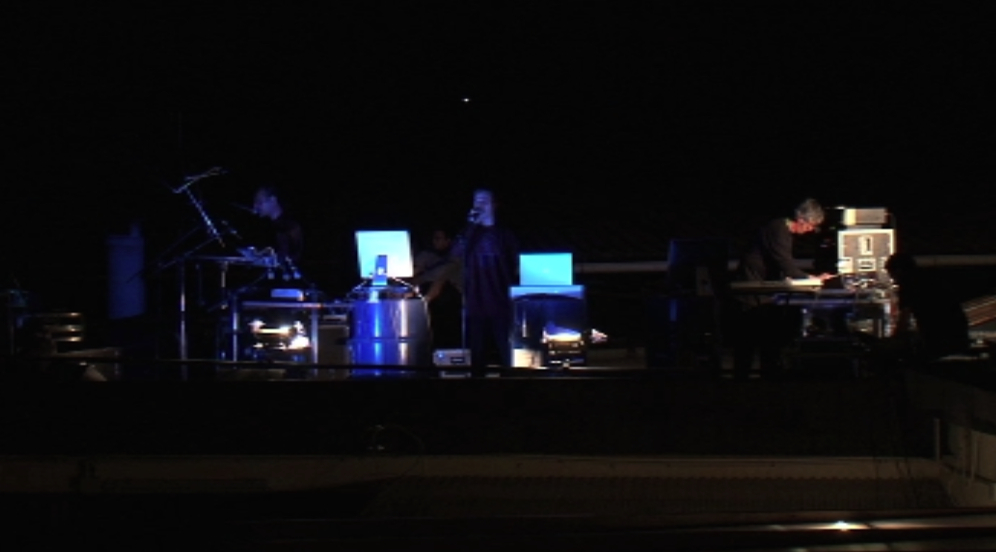
Monuments live at the Nietzsche Fabrik, Turin, 2008

== Discography ==
Albums

- Body section (vinyl) A.A.V.V. Electric Eye (1983)
- Age (vinyl) Discordie (1984)
- Labyrinthus NP (1986)
- A est di Benù NP (1991)
- Body section (CD) A.A.V.V. Spittle Records (2007)
- XXVII Anna Logue Records (2008)
- Torino Reloaded (vinyl) A.A.V.V. Traffic Festival (2009)
- Danza Meccanica A.A.V.V. Mannequin Records (2009)
- Fifth Anniversary A.A.V.V. Anna Logue Records (2010)
- New wave italiana A.A.V.V. Spittle Records (2011)
- Fifth Anniversary A.A.V.V. Mannequin Records (2012)
- Age + bonus tracks (vinyl) Mannequin Records (2013)

Soundtracks (Radio and Theatre)

- Il teppista stellare RAI Italian Radio (1985)
- Oltre Plutone RAI Italian Radio (1986)
- Sculacciando la cameriera Arco Theatre Company (1987)
- La danza della rabbia Sosta Palmizi (1989)
- Notti rosse RAI Italian Radio (1991)
- Il mulino magico RAI Italian Radio (1994)
- Quaderni di Banna Banna Art Foundation (2005–2014)

Television theme tunes

- Tu mi senti Torino RAI Italian Radio (1985)
- Pronto Polizia Mediaset (1991)
- Pronto intervento Mediaset (1993)
- Intervalli Europei RAI Italian TV (1995)
- Italiani brava gente RAI Italian TV (1996)
