= Domènec Sugrañes i Gras =

Spanish architect (1878–1938)

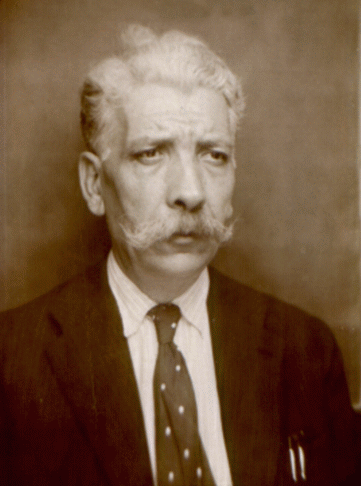
- Born: 12 December 1878; Reus, Catalonia, Spain
- Died: 9 August 1938 (aged 59); Barcelona, Catalonia, Spain
- Occupation: Architect
- Buildings: Sagrada Família

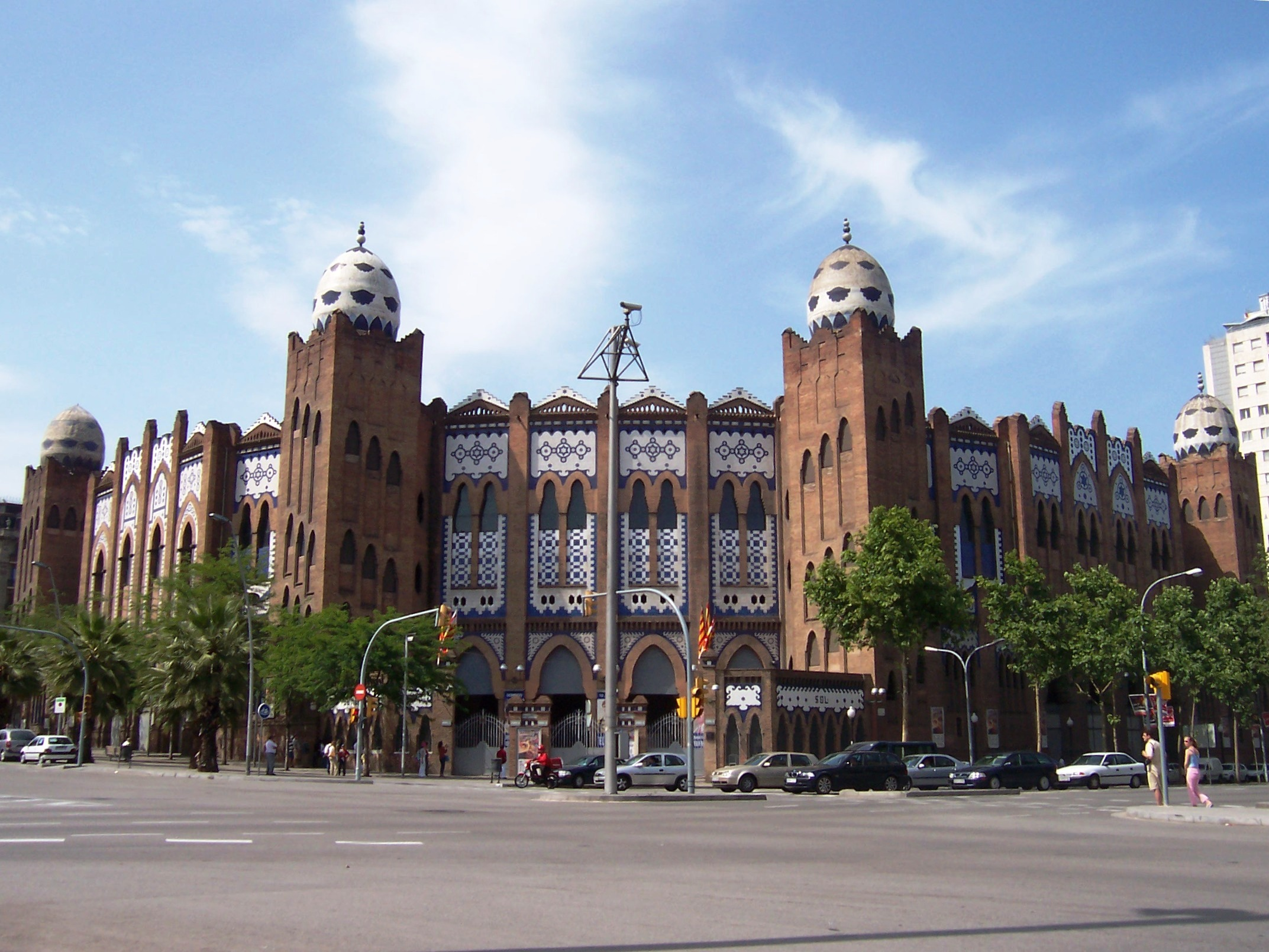
Plaça de toros de la Monumental, one of the two former bullrings of Barcelona

Domènec Sugrañes i Gras (Catalan pronunciation: [duˈmɛnək suˈɣɾaɲəz i ˈɣɾas]; 12 December 1878 – 9 August 1938) was a Catalan modernist architect and disciple of Antoni Gaudí. He succeeded him at the head of the works of the church of the Sagrada Família and finished the façade of the Nativity. Sugrañes held this charge during 10 years, from Gaudí's death in 1926 until 20 July 1936.

== Biography ==
Gaudí met Sugrañes in 1905 during his last year at the school of architecture. Since then, he participated in most of Gaudí's works. In collaboration with Gaudí, Sugrañes decorated the Bellesguard house with seating banks in mosaic (1917). He made the house of Hermenegild Miralles i Anglès, of which Gaudí made only gateway to the property. He also collaborated in the Casa Batlló and Casa Milà.

Sugrañes became close with Gaudí to the extent that the latter established him as his testamentary executor.

== List of works ==
- The Plaza Monumental de Barcelona in collaboration with Manuel Joaquim Raspall i Mayol (1913).
- "Casa Bonet", Salou, (1918).
- Buildings "Balmes 107-109", Barcelona (1922).
- Building Muntaner "147 - Rosselló 142", Barcelona (1928)
- Public school of the Piarists, Balmes street, Barcelona (1928).
- "Casa Pellicer", Reus (1928).
- Public school of Capellades (1931).
- Buildings Muntaner 193 - Londres 88-90 Barcelona (1932).
