= Monumental Island =

Island in Nunavut, Canada

Native name: Umiannguaq
- Location within Nunavut Location within Canada

Geography
- Location: Davis Strait
- Coordinates: 62°46′N 63°51′W
- Archipelago: Arctic Archipelago

Administration
- Canada
- Nunavut: Nunavut
- Region: Qikiqtaaluk

Demographics
- Population: Uninhabited

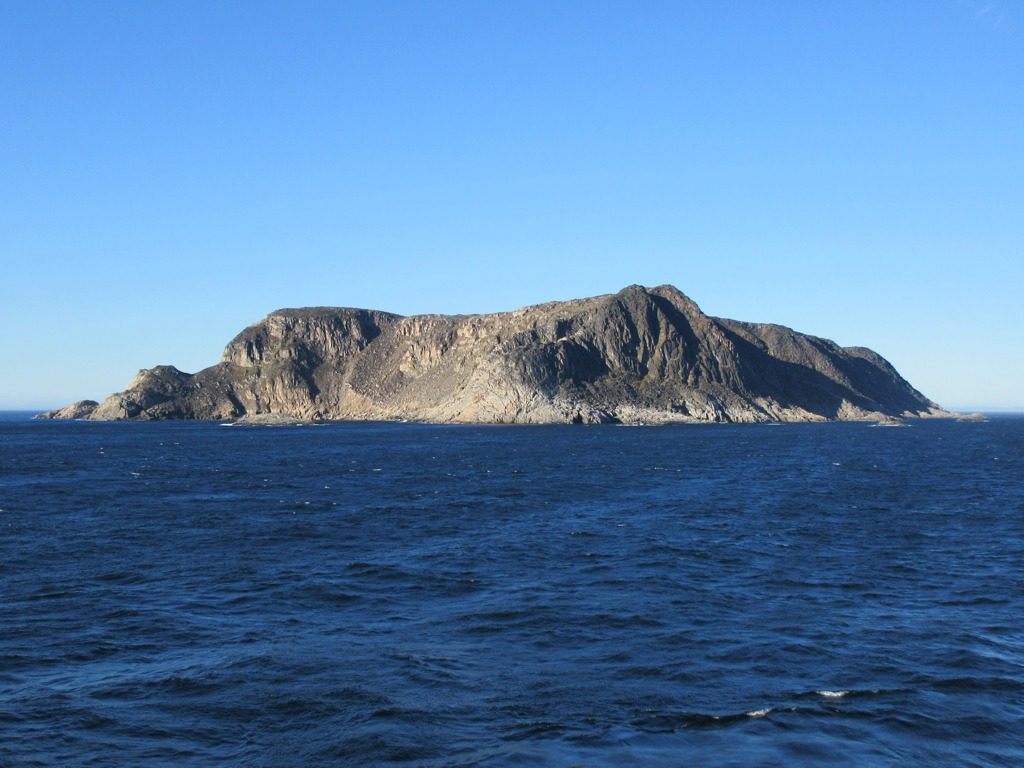
Walrus, polar bears, and seals are often seen around Monumental Island in the Davis Strait southeast of Baffin Island, Nunavut, Canada.

Monumental Island (Inuktitut: ᐅᒥᐊᙳᐊᖅ, romanized: Umiannguaq) is a Baffin Island offshore island located in the Arctic Archipelago in the territory of Nunavut. The island lies in Davis Strait, almost halfway between Lady Franklin Island and Little Hall Island.

Monumental Island was named by Charles Francis Hall, an Arctic explorer, as a tribute to the memory of Sir John Franklin.
