= Estadio Monumental Universidad Andina de Juliaca =

- Estadio Monumental de la UANCV
- Interactive map of Estadio Monumental Universidad Andina de Juliaca
- Full name: Estadio Monumental Universidad Andina de Juliaca
- Location: Juliaca, Peru
- Coordinates: 15.5348°S 70.1213°W
- Capacity: 40,000 (football)

Construction
- Groundbreaking: 2010
- Built: 2012

Tenant
- C.D. Universidad Andina Néstor Cáceres Velásquez

Estadio Monumental Universidad Andina de Juliaca, also known as Estadio Monumental de la UANCV, is a multi-purpose stadium in Juliaca, Peru. It is currently used by football team C.D. Universidad Andina Néstor Cáceres Velásquez. The stadium holds 40,000 people and was built in 2012.
