= Estadio Monumental de Jauja =

Coordinates: 11.7858°S 75.4858°W

Estadio Monumental de Jauja is a multi-use stadium in Jauja, Peru. It was used by football team Deportivo Wanka.

The stadium holds 10,000 people.
