= La Monumental =

Bullring in Barcelona

Coordinates: 41°24′1″N 2°10′53″E

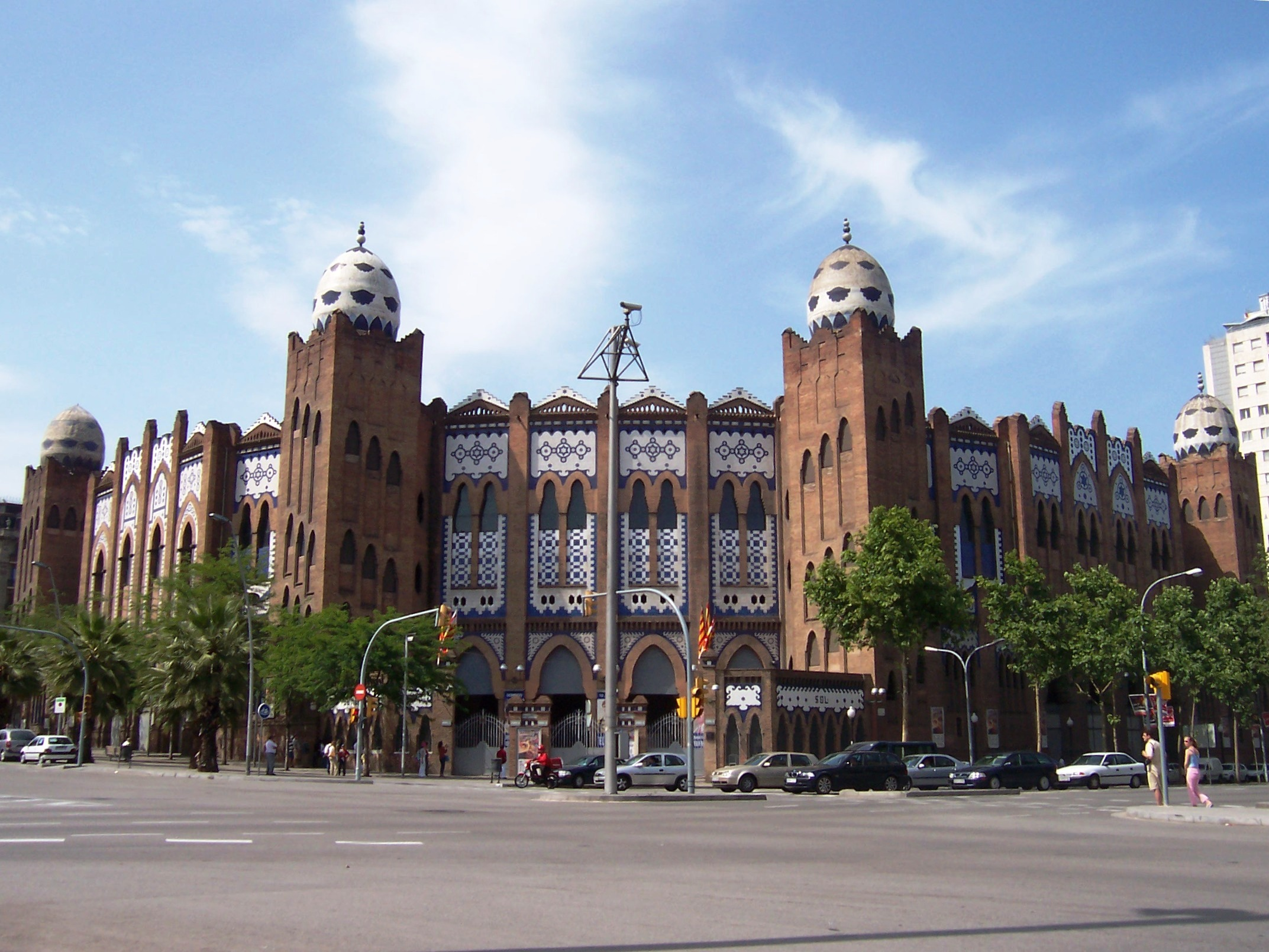

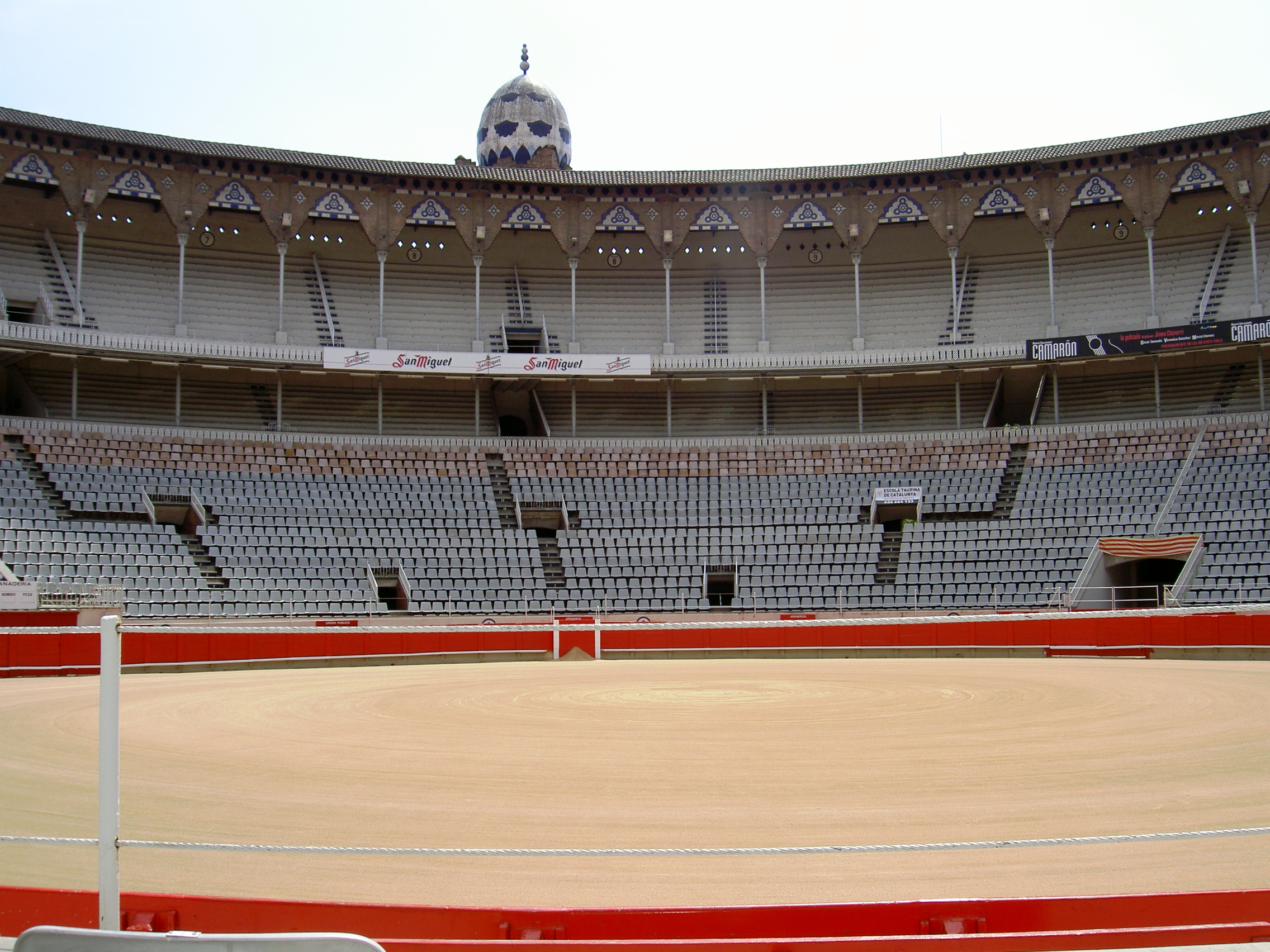

The Plaza de Toros Monumental de Barcelona, often known simply as La Monumental (Catalan pronunciation: [lə munumənˈtal]), is a bullring in the city of Barcelona, Catalonia, Spain. It was the last bullfighting arena in commercial operation in Catalonia. It was inaugurated in 1914 under the name Plaza de El Sport and was soon expanded and given its current name in 1916. It is situated at the confluence of the Gran Via and Carrer Marina (Marina Street) in the Eixample district. It has a capacity of 19,582 within 26 rows of lines, boxes, and stands on the first floor inside and an upper gallery surrounding the building.

It was the last place in Catalonia where bullfights were held (in 2011) since the Parliament of Catalonia passed a law banning bullfighting events on 28 July 2010 that came into force in 2012. Though the ban was overturned in 2016, no further bullfights had taken place as of July 2020.

It is owned by the Balañá family, who placed it under the control of the Casa Matilla, an organisation which manages a number of bullrings. The plaza is currently used for sporting, musical and circus events.

The building was originally built in the noucentista architectural style, the work of Manuel Joaquim Raspall i Mayol. The expansion work was done by Ignasi Mas i Morell and Domènec Sugrañes i Gras to give it its current facade, strongly influenced by Mudéjar and Byzantine architecture. It is one of the larger public arenas in Barcelona, with a capacity of 19,582 for bullfights or about 25,000 for events such as rock concerts (using part of the ring for spectators).

== See also ==
- Monumental station, serving the arena
